= Index of Colorado-related articles =

Coordinates: 38.9972°N 105.5478°W

The location of the State of Colorado in the United States of America.

This is an alphabetical list of articles related to the U.S. State of Colorado.

== 0–9 ==
- .co.us – Internet second-level domain for the State of Colorado
- 4 Corners
  - 4 Corners Monument
- 6th Principal Meridian
- 10-mile Range
- 10th Mountain Division (United States)
- 16th Street Mall
- 25th meridian west from Washington
- 32nd meridian west from Washington
- 37th parallel north
- 38th parallel north
- 39th parallel north
- 40th parallel north
- 41st parallel north
- 64 counties of the State of Colorado
- 100 km isolated peaks of Colorado
- 103rd meridian west
- 104th meridian west
- 105th meridian west
- 106th meridian west
- 107th meridian west
- 108th meridian west
- 109th meridian west
- 1500 meter prominent peaks of Colorado
- 4000 meter peaks of Colorado
- 5280 magazine website
- 14,000-foot peaks of Colorado

== A ==
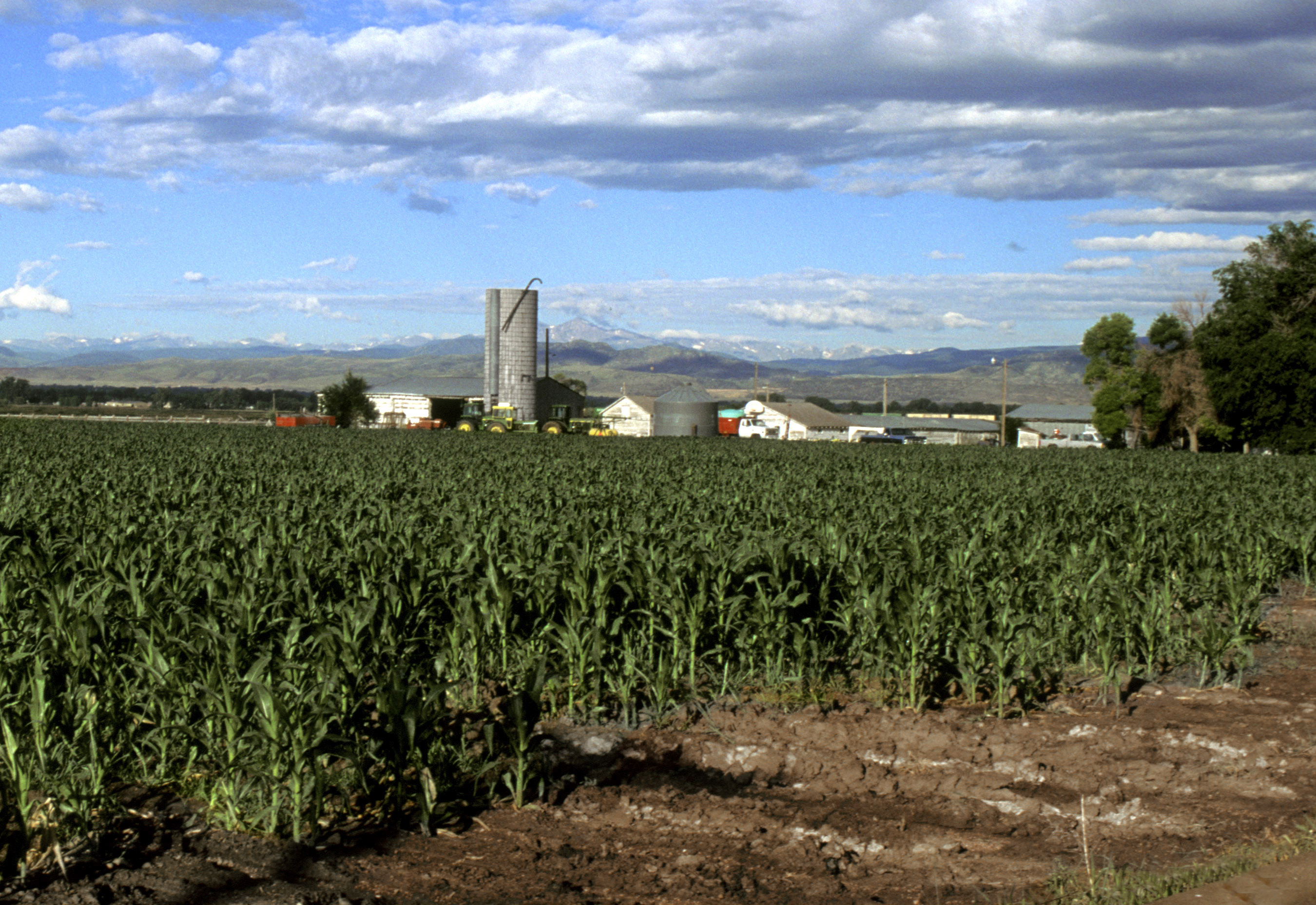
Maize growing in Larimer County

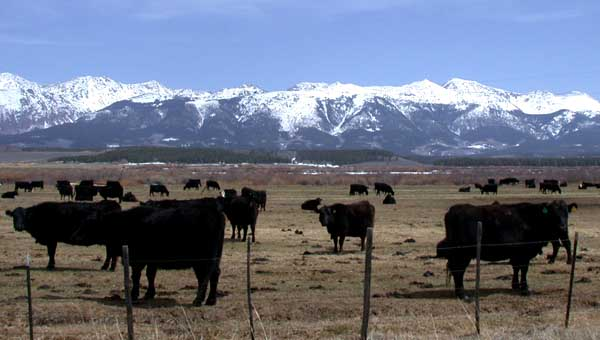
Cattle ranching in Jackson County

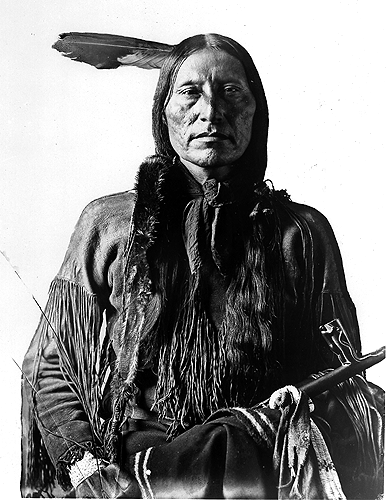
Scabby Bull of the Arapaho Nation

- Adams County, Colorado
- Adams-Onís Treaty of 1819
- Adjacent States: (seven, the third most of the 50 states)
  - State of Arizona
  - State of Kansas
  - State of Nebraska
  - State of New Mexico
  - State of Oklahoma
  - State of Utah
  - State of Wyoming
- Agloves
- Airports of Colorado
- Alamosa County, Colorado
- Sidney Altman
- Colorado in the American Civil War
- American Ranch massacre
- Amusement parks in Colorado
- Ancestral Puebloans - Native Americans
- Antilocapra americana
- Aquamarine - Colorado state gemstone
- Aquaria in Colorado
  - commons:Category:Aquaria in Colorado
- Aquilegia coerulea - Colorado state flower
- Arapaho Nation of Native Americans
- Arapahoe County, Colorado (Note: One of the 17 original counties created by the Territory of Colorado on November 1, 1861.) (Note: A county in both the Territory of Colorado and the State of Colorado.)
- Arapahoe County, Kansas Territory (Note: A territorial county which existed within the boundaries of the present State of Colorado prior to the formation of the Territory of Colorado on February 28, 1861.) (Note: A historic county which no longer exists.)
- Arrappahoe County, Jefferson Territory (Note: One of the 12 counties created by the extralegal Territory of Jefferson on November 28, 1859.)
- Arboreta in Colorado
  - commons:Category:Arboreta in Colorado
- Archuleta County, Colorado
- Arkansas River
  - Early history of the Arkansas Valley in Colorado
- Art museums and galleries in Colorado
  - commons:Category:Art museums and galleries in Colorado
- Astronomical observatories in Colorado
  - commons:Category:Astronomical observatories in Colorado
- Attorney General of the State of Colorado website
- Aurora, Colorado

== B ==
- Baca County, Colorado
- Battle of Beecher Island
- Battle of Julesburg
- Battle of Summit Springs
- Ballot measures of Colorado
- Beaver County, Utah Territory
- Charles Bent
- William Bent
- Bent County, Colorado
- Blue grama - Colorado state grass
- Boards of cooperative educational services in Colorado website
- Botanical gardens in Colorado
  - commons:Category:Botanical gardens in Colorado
- Boulder County, Colorado
- Bouteloua gracilis - Colorado state grass
- Broderick County, Kansas Territory
- City and County of Broomfield, Colorado
- Margaret Brown
- Mary Babnik Brown
- Buildings and structures in Colorado
  - commons:Category:Buildings and structures in Colorado

== C ==
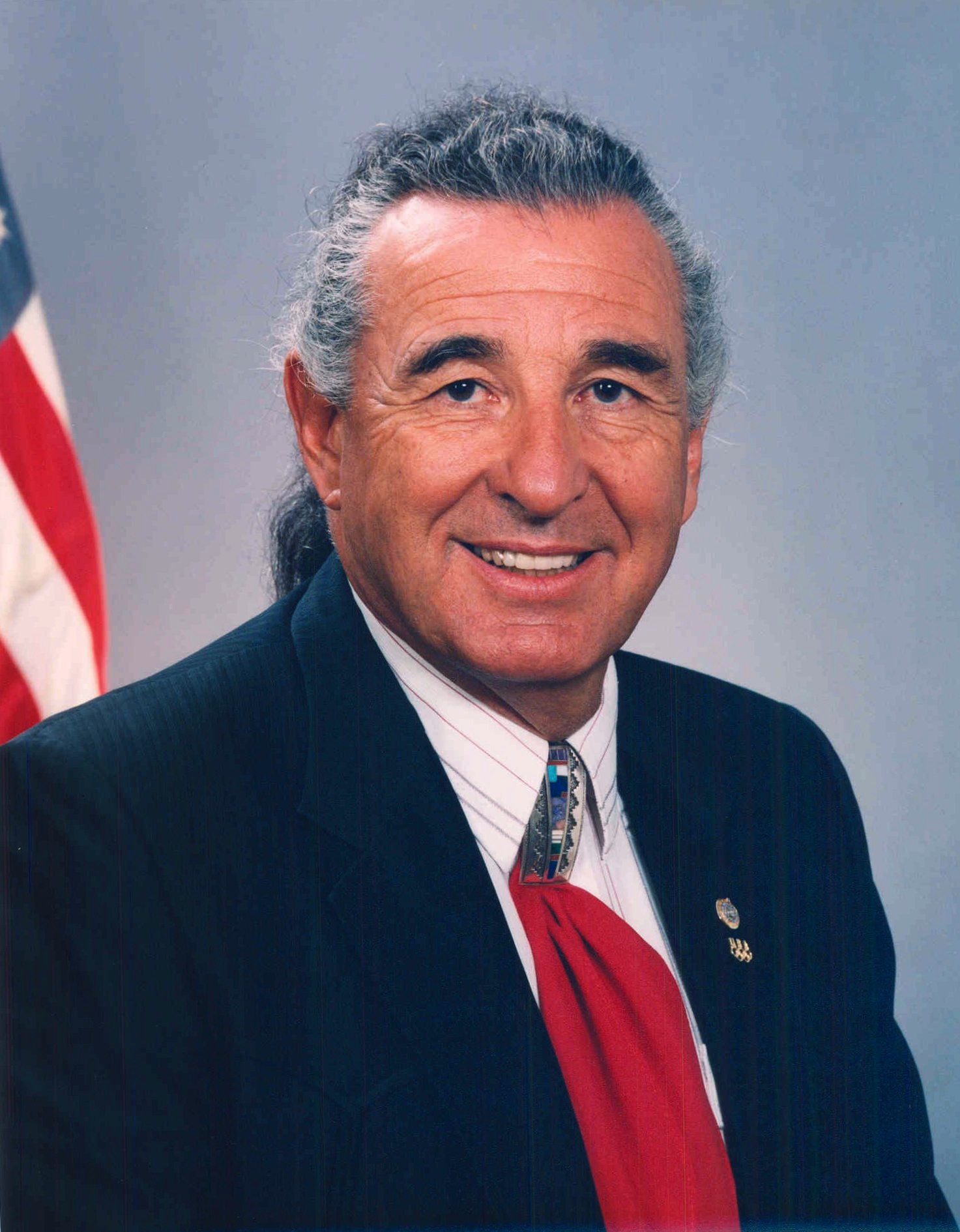
Ben Nighthorse Campbell, a chief of the Cheyenne Nation, captain of the 1964 U.S. Olympic Judo Team, and former U.S. senator from Colorado

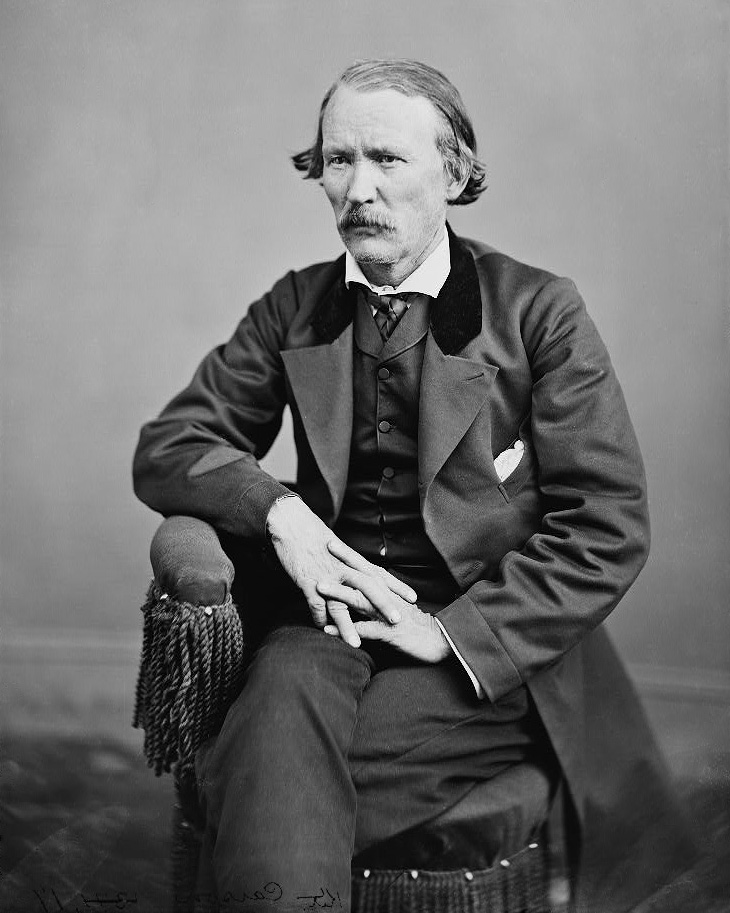
General Kit Carson

- Calamospiza melanocorys - Colorado state bird
- Calhan Paint Mines Archeological District
- Camp Carson
- Camp Collins
- Camp Hale
- Ben Nighthorse Campbell
- Capital of the State of Colorado website
  - commons:Category:Denver, Colorado
- Capitol of the State of Colorado website
  - commons:Category:Colorado State Capitol
- Carbonate County, Colorado
- Scott Carpenter
- Kit Carson
- Thomas Cech
- Choirs in Colorado
- Census designated areas of Colorado
- Census statistical areas of Colorado
- Centennial State - Colorado state nickname
- Chaffee County, Colorado
- Don Cheadle
- Cherokee Ranch
- Cherokee Ranch petrified forest
- Cheyenne County, Colorado
- Cheyenne County, Jefferson Territory
- Cheyenne Nation of Native Americans
- Chronology of the Colorado Constitution
- Chrysemys picta bellii - Colorado state reptile
- Cities - see List of municipalities in Colorado
  - List of city nicknames in Colorado
- Civil War military units from Colorado
- Clear Creek County, Colorado
- Climate of Colorado
- Climate change in Colorado
- CO – United States Postal Service postal code for the State of Colorado
- Coal mining in Colorado
- Colleges and universities in Colorado
  - commons:Category:Universities and colleges in Colorado

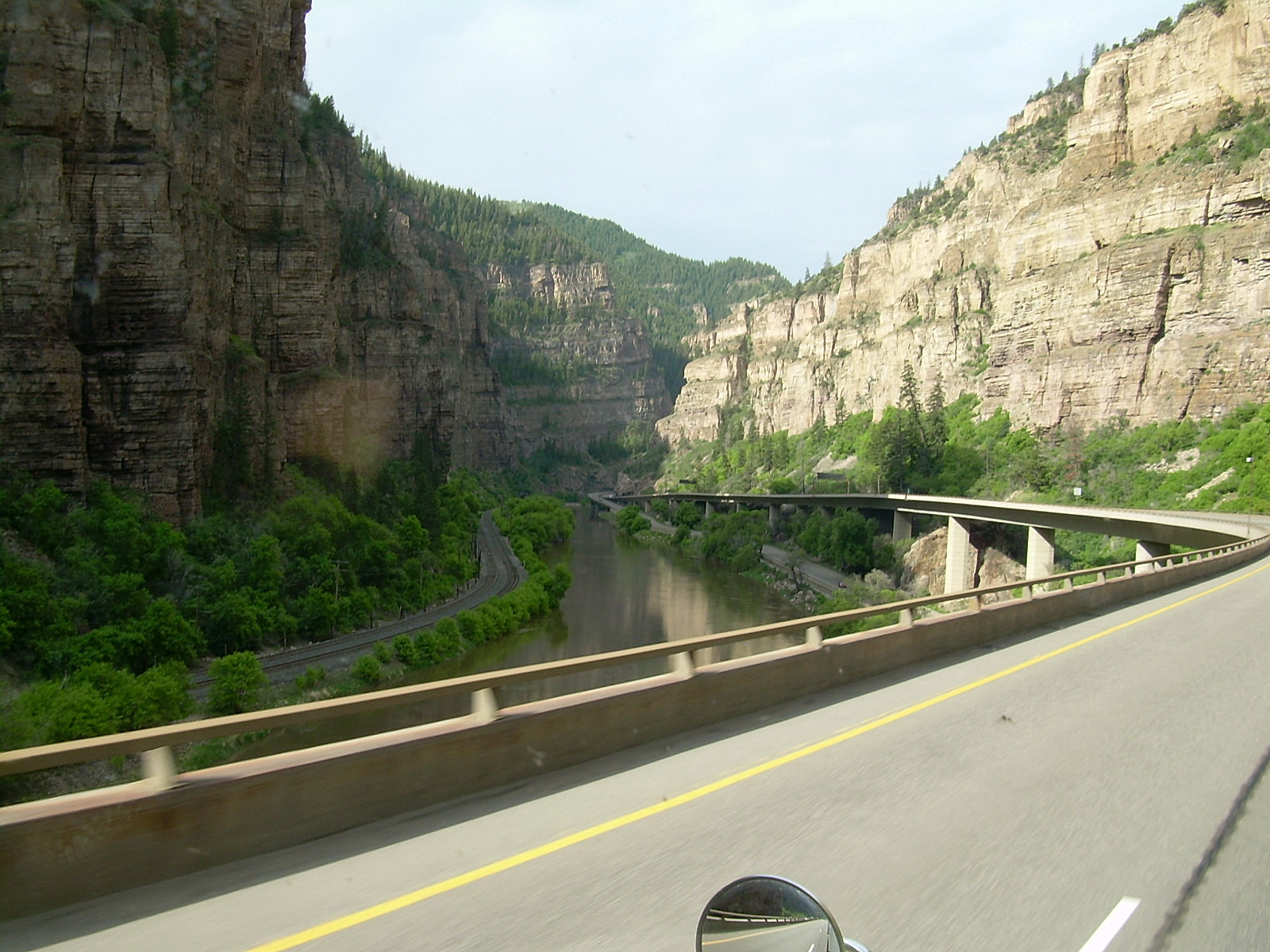
The Union Pacific Railroad, the Colorado River, and Interstate 70 in Glenwood Canyon

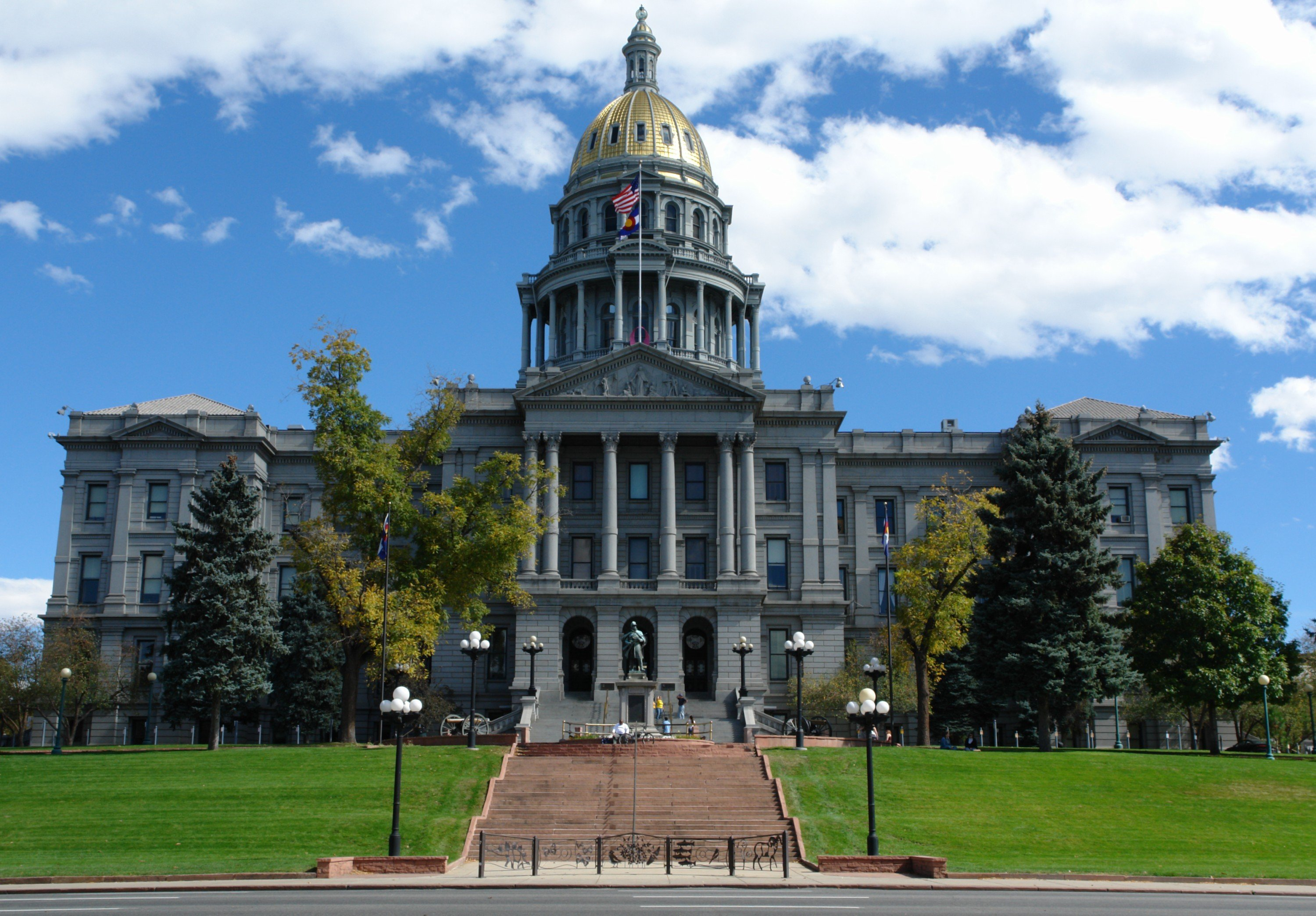
The Colorado State Capitol in Denver

Map of the 14 Core Based Statistical Areas in the State of Colorado

- Colorado website
  - Category:Colorado
    - commons:Category:Colorado
      - commons:Category:Maps of Colorado
- Colorado Air National Guard website
- Colorado Amendment 20
- Colorado Army National Guard website
- Colorado Authors Hall of Fame
- Colorado Aviation Hall of Fame
- Colorado blue spruce - Colorado state tree
- Colorado breweries
- Colorado census designated places
- Colorado census statistical areas
- Colorado cities and towns
  - List of city nicknames in Colorado
- Colorado City, territorial capital 1862
- Colorado Coalfield War
- Colorado Convention Center
- Colorado counties
  - Colorado counties ranked by per capita income
  - List of counties in Colorado
- Colorado Court of Appeals
- Colorado drainage basins
- Colorado Eastern Plains
- Colorado Education Association
- Colorado Engineering Experiment Station, Inc.
- Colorado forts
- Colorado Fuel and Iron
- Colorado General Assembly
- Colorado ghost towns
- Colorado Governor's Mansion
- Colorado hairstreak butterfly - Colorado state insect
- Colorado House of Representatives
- Colorado in the American Civil War
- Colorado Labor Wars
- Colorado Lottery website
- Colorado lunar sample displays
- Colorado Media School
- Colorado metropolitan areas
- Colorado Mineral Belt
- Colorado Mining Association
- Colorado municipalities
  - Colorado municipalities by county
  - commons:Category:Cities in Colorado
- Colorado orogeny
- Colorado Parks and Wildlife website
  - commons:Category:State parks of Colorado
- Colorado Piedmont
- Colorado places
  - Colorado places ranked by per capita income
- Colorado Plateau
- Colorado poetry fellowship
- Colorado professional sports teams
- Colorado Public Radio
- Colorado Public Utilities Commission website
- Colorado River
- Colorado River Water Conservation District
- Colorado Scenic and Historic Byways
- Colorado School of Mines website
- Colorado Senate
- Colorado Silver Boom
- Colorado Springs, Colorado
- Colorado State Capitol website
  - commons:Category:Colorado State Capitol
- Colorado State Fair website
- Colorado State Forest website
- Colorado state government website
- Colorado state highways website
- Colorado State Patrol website
- Colorado state prisons
- Colorado state representatives
- Colorado state senators
- Colorado state symbols website
- Colorado state tartan website
- Colorado State University website
- Colorado Supreme Court
- Colorado War
- Colorado Water Trust
- Colorado wine
- Colorado-Big Thompson Project
- Columbine High School massacre of 1999
- Columbine Mine massacre of 1927
- Columbine State
- Comanche Nation of Native Americans website
- Community colleges of Colorado website
  - commons:Category:Universities and colleges in Colorado
- Community Foundation of Northern Colorado
- Companies in Colorado
  - Category:Companies based in Colorado
- Edward Condon
- Conejos County, Colorado
- Congressional districts of Colorado
- Constitution of the State of Colorado website

An enlargeable map of the 64 counties of the State of Colorado

- Cooperative educational services in Colorado website
- Adolph Coors
- Coors Field
- Counties of Colorado website
  - commons:Category:Counties in Colorado
- Court of Appeals of the State of Colorado website
- Costilla County, Colorado
- Cripple Creek miners' strike of 1894
- Crowley County, Colorado
- Custer County, Colorado

== D ==
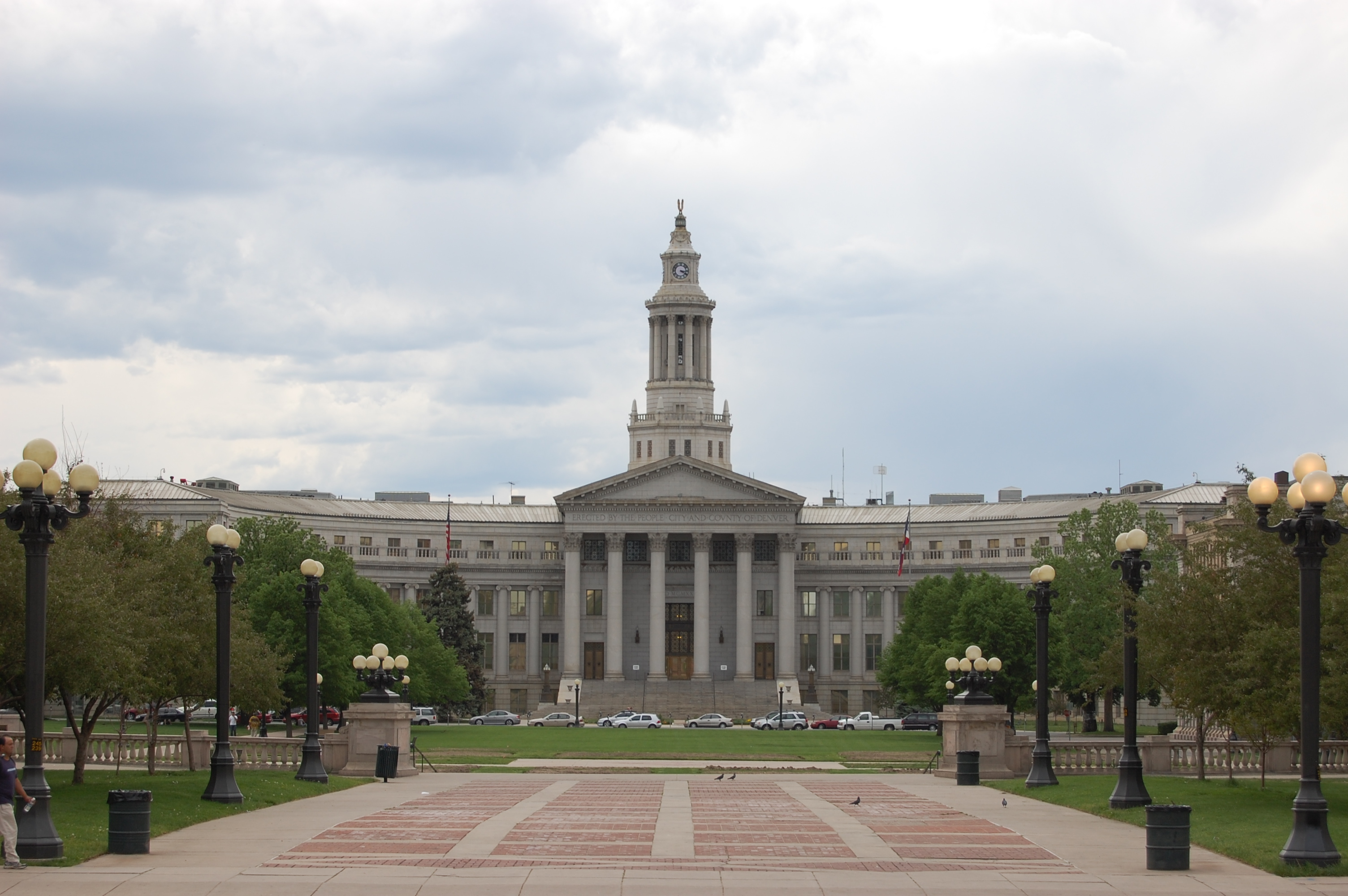
The Denver City and County Building

- Delta County, Colorado
- Demographics of Colorado website
  - Category:Demographics of Colorado
- John Denver
- Denver, Colorado, territorial and state capital since 1867
  - Denver City, capital of the extralegal Jefferson Territory 1859–1860, capital of the Colorado Territory 1861-1862 and 1867–1876
  - City and County of Denver, Colorado
- Denver and Rio Grande Western Railroad
- Denver International Airport
- Denver Regional Council of Governments
- Dick's Sporting Goods Park
- Dolores County, Colorado
- Dominguez-Escalante Expedition, 1776
- Douglas County, Colorado
- Drainage basins of Colorado website

== E ==
- Eagle County, Colorado
- Economy of Colorado
  - Category:Economy of Colorado
    - commons:Category:Economy of Colorado
- Education in Colorado
  - Category:Education in Colorado
    - commons:Category:Education in Colorado
- Dwight Eisenhower
- Mamie Eisenhower
- El Paso County, Colorado
- El Paso County, Jefferson Territory
- El Paso County, Kansas Territory
- Elbert County, Colorado
- Elections in the state of Colorado
  - commons:Category:Elections in Colorado
- English Retreads
- Environment of Colorado
  - commons:Category:Environment of Colorado
- John Evans (Colorado governor)
- Evans, Colorado
- Evans Memorial Chapel
- Evans Peak
- Execution in Colorado
- Executive branch of the government of the State of Colorado
- Executive Recycling

== F ==
The Flag of the State of Colorado

Map of the Front Range Urban Corridor of Colorado and Wyoming

- Festivals in Colorado
  - commons:Category:Festivals in Colorado
- Films set in Colorado
- Films shot in Colorado
- Flag of the State of Colorado
- Gerald Ford
- Fort Collins, Colorado
- Fortieth parallel north
- Forts in Colorado:
  - Bent's Old Fort
  - Fort Carson
  - Fort Collins
  - Fort Garland
  - Fort Logan
  - Fort Lupton
  - Fort Morgan
  - Fort Saint Vrain
  - Fort Vasquez
  - Fort Lyon
  - Spanish Fort
  - Category:Forts in Colorado
    - commons:Category:Forts in Colorado
- Forty-first parallel north
- Fountain County, Jefferson Territory
- Four Corners
  - Four Corners Monument
- Fourteeners of Colorado website
- Fremont County, Colorado
- Fremont County, Kansas Territory
- Front Range
- Front Range Urban Corridor
- Hildreth Frost

== G ==
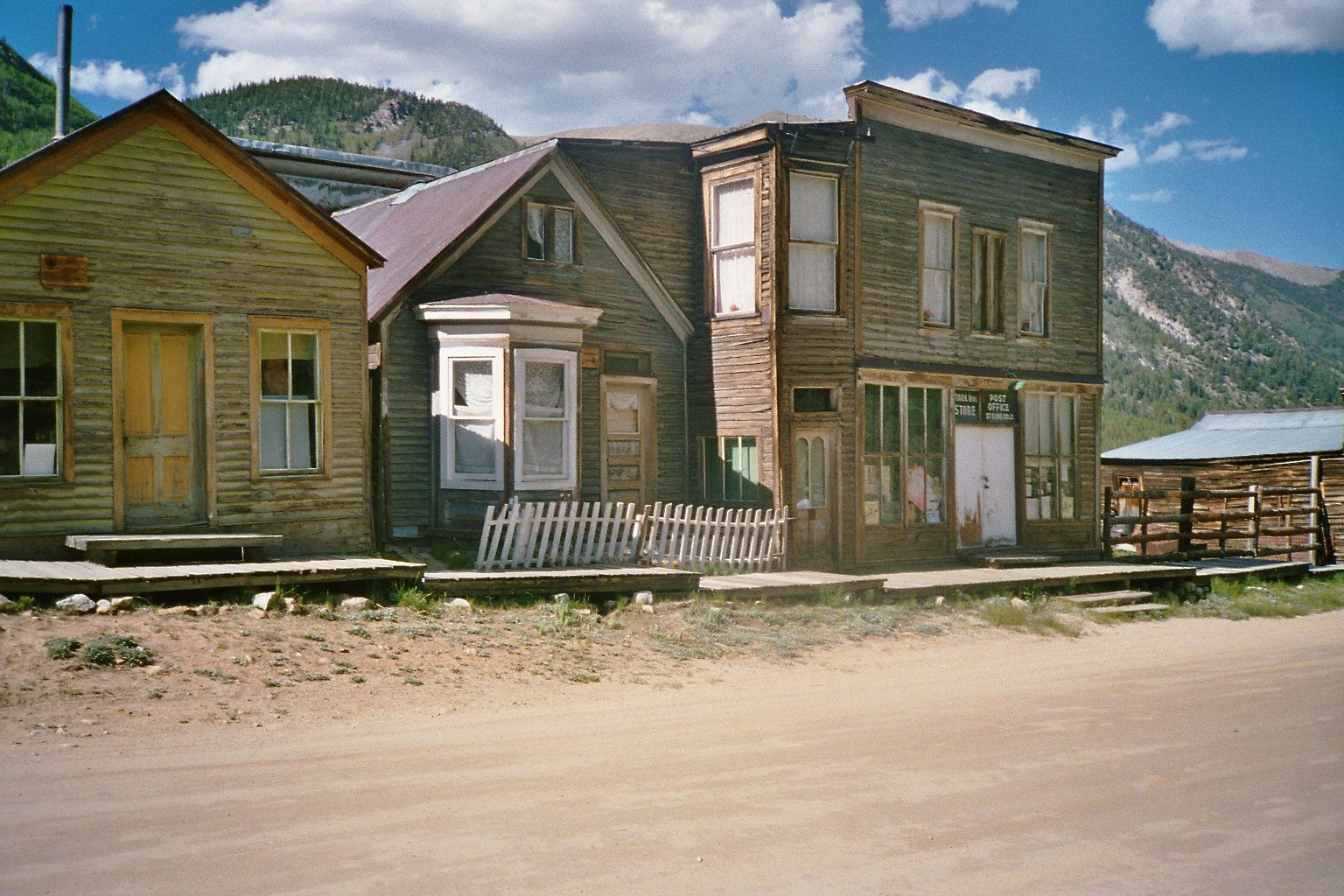
The ghost town of Saint Elmo, Colorado

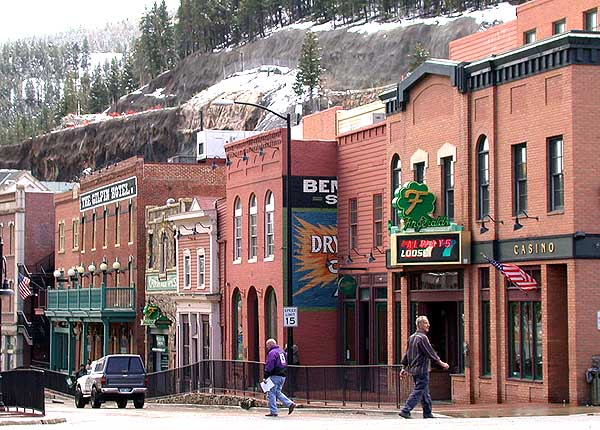
The former gold mining camp of Black Hawk, Colorado

The Great Seal of the State of Colorado

- George Gamow
- Garfield County, Colorado
- Charles Gates, Jr.
- General Assembly of Colorado website
- Geography of Colorado
  - Geographic regions of Colorado
  - Category:Geography of Colorado
    - commons:Category:Geography of Colorado
- Geology of Colorado
  - Geology of the Rocky Mountains
  - commons:Category:Geology of Colorado
- Georgetown Loop
- Gilpin County, Colorado
- Ghost towns in Colorado
  - Category:Ghost towns in Colorado
    - commons:Category:Ghost towns in Colorado
- Gold mining in Colorado
- Gold Rush, Pike's Peak
- Golden City, capital of the extralegal Jefferson Territory 1860–1861, capital of Colorado Territory 1862-1867
- Government of the State of Colorado website
  - Category:Government of Colorado
    - commons:Category:Government of Colorado
- Governor of the State of Colorado website
  - List of governors of Colorado
- Grand County, Colorado
- Great American Desert
- Great Plains
- Great Salt Lake County, Utah Territory (Note: Great Salt Lake County, Utah Territory, was renamed Salt Lake County on January 29, 1868.)
- Great Seal of the State of Colorado
- Julia Greeley
- Greeley, Colorado
- Green River
- Green River County, Utah Territory
- Greenback cutthroat trout - Colorado state fish
- Greenwood County, Colorado Territory
- Guadalupe County, Colorado Territory (Note: Guadalupe County, Colorado Territory, was renamed Conejos County on November 7, 1861.)
- Gunnison County, Colorado

== H ==
- John L. Hall
- Patrick J. Hamrock
- Michael Hancock
- Heele County, Jefferson Territory
- Heritage railroads in Colorado
  - Commons:Category:Heritage railroads in Colorado
- High Plains
- High schools of Colorado
- Higher education in Colorado
- Highest major peaks of Colorado
- Highest State
- Hiking trails in Colorado
  - commons:Category:Hiking trails in Colorado
- Highway routes in Colorado
- Hinsdale County, Colorado
- Historic byways of Colorado
- Historic counties of Colorado
- History of Colorado
  - Historical outline of Colorado
    - Category:History of Colorado
      - commons:Category:History of Colorado
- Hospitals in Colorado
- Hot springs of Colorado
  - commons:Category:Hot springs of Colorado
- House of Representatives of the State of Colorado
- Huerfano County, Colorado
- Hypaurotis crysalus - Colorado state insect

== I ==
- Images of Colorado
  - commons:Category:Colorado
- Insignia of the State of Colorado website
  - commons:Category:Symbols of Colorado
- Iron County, Utah Territory
- James Irwin

== J ==
- William Henry Jackson
- Jackson County, Colorado
- Jackson County, Jefferson Territory
- Jefferson County, Colorado
- Jefferson County, Jefferson Territory
- Jefferson Territory
- Judicial branch of the government of the State of Colorado

== K ==
- Tweet Kimball
- Kiowa County, Colorado
- Kit Carson County, Colorado
- Herbert Kroemer

== L ==
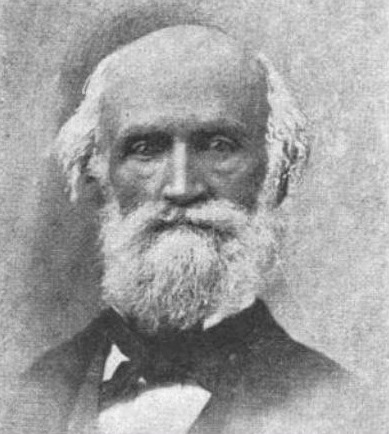
Robert Williamson Steele, Governor of the extralegal Territory of Jefferson.

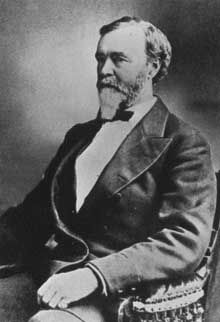
William Gilpin, the first governor of the Territory of Colorado.

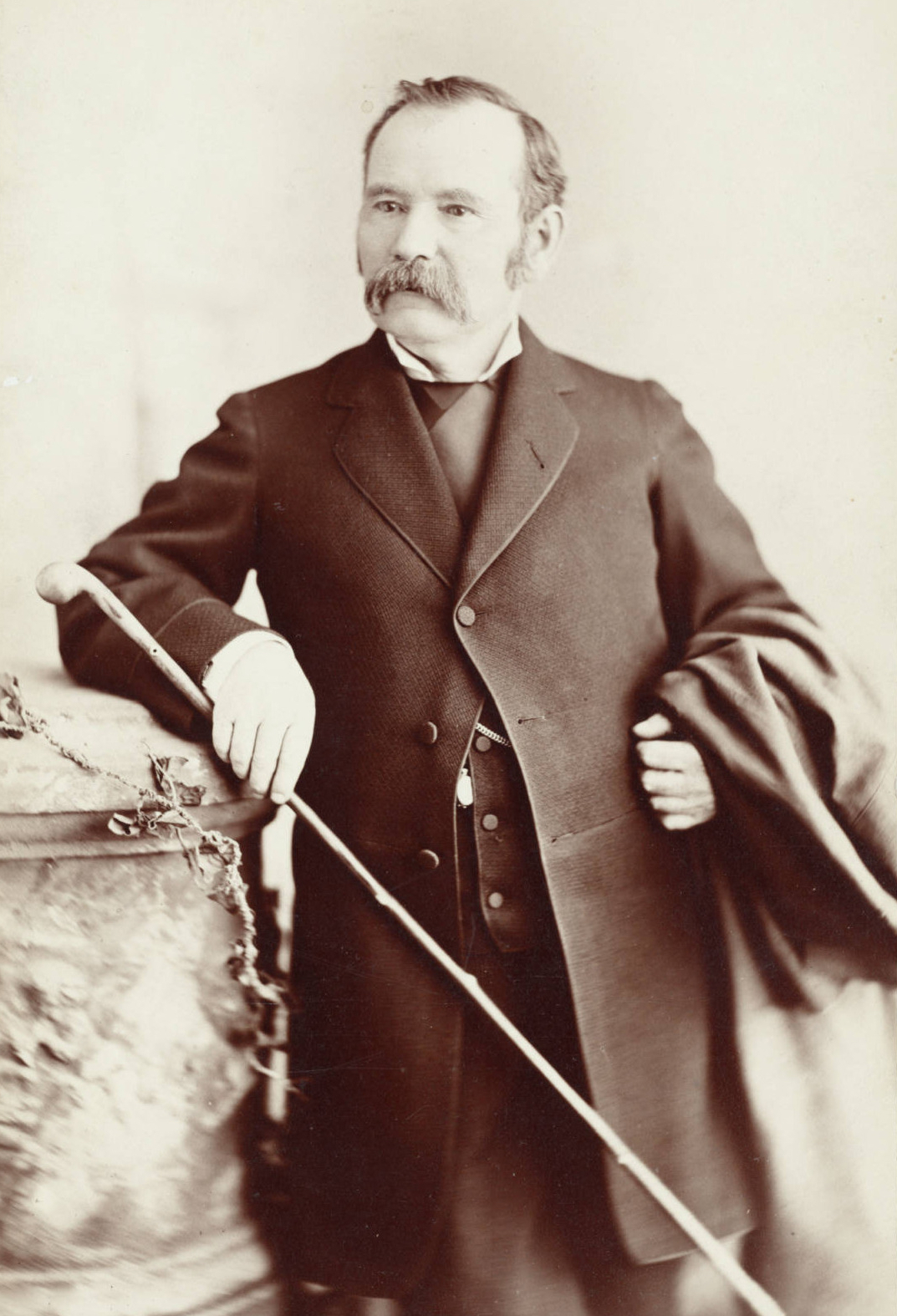
John Long Routt, the last governor of the Territory of Colorado and the first and seventh governor of the State of Colorado.

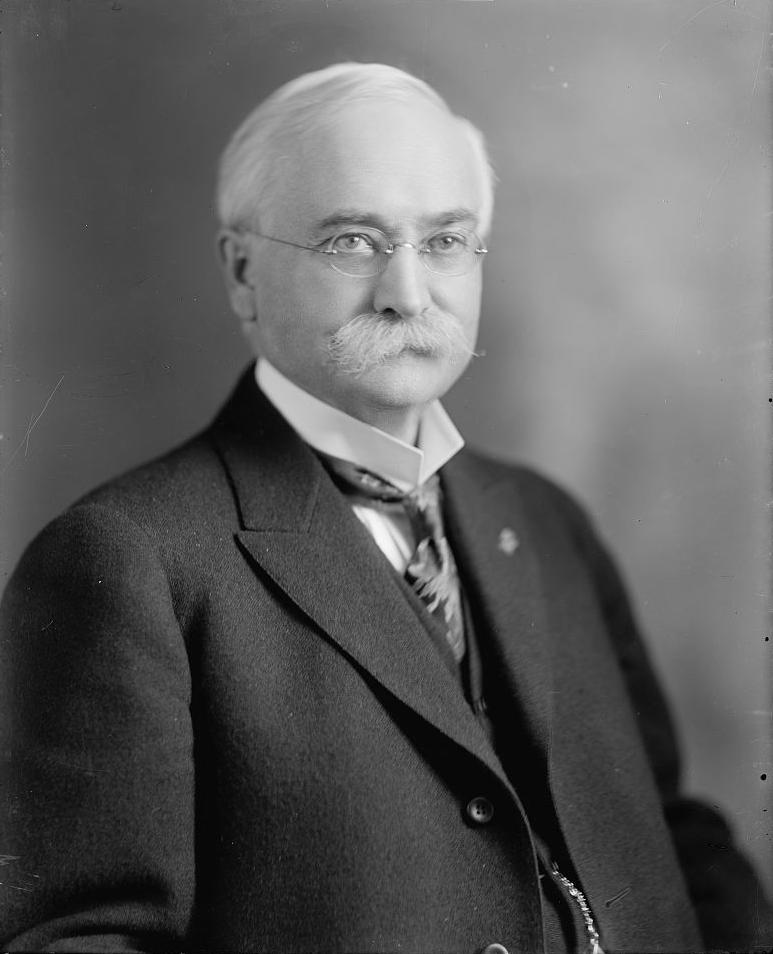
Alva Adams, the 5th, 10th and 14th governor of the State of Colorado.

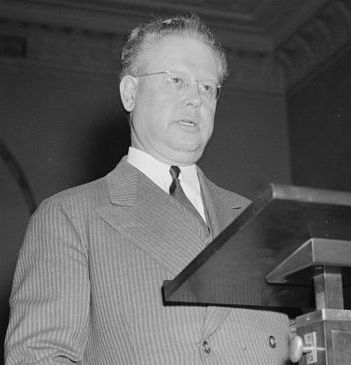
Ralph Lawrence Carr, the 29th governor of the State of Colorado.

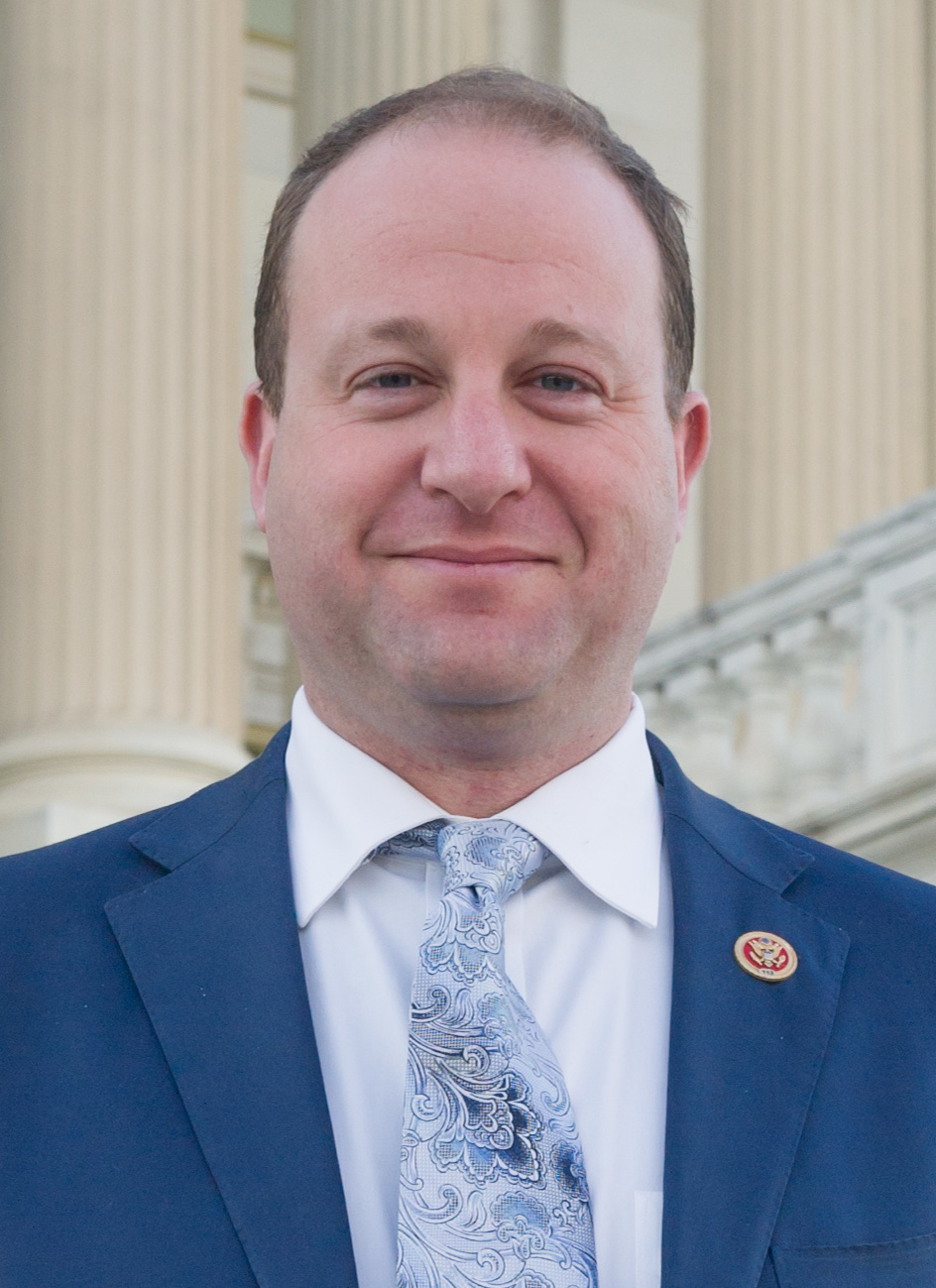
Jared Polis, the 43rd governor of the State of Colorado.

- La Plata County, Colorado
- Lake County, Colorado
- Lakes of Colorado
  - commons:Category:Lakes of Colorado
- Lakewood, Colorado
- Landmarks in Colorado
  - commons:Category:Landmarks in Colorado
- Larimer County, Colorado
- Lark bunting - Colorado state bird
- Las Animas County, Colorado
- Law enforcement agencies of Colorado
- Laws of the State of Colorado website
- Legislative branch of the government of the State of Colorado
- Lieutenant Governor of the State of Colorado website
- Lincoln County, Colorado
- Lists related to the State of Colorado:
  - List of airports in Colorado
  - List of ballot measures in Colorado
  - List of boards of cooperative educational services in Colorado
  - List of census designated places in Colorado
  - List of census statistical areas in Colorado
  - List of cities and towns in Colorado
    - List of city nicknames in Colorado
  - List of Civil War units from Colorado
  - List of colleges and universities in Colorado
  - List of companies based in Colorado
  - List of Colorado counties by socioeconomic factors
  - List of counties in Colorado
    - List of Colorado counties ranked by per capita income
    - Table of Colorado counties
  - List of drainage basins in Colorado
  - List of dams and reservoirs in Colorado
  - List of forts in Colorado
  - List of ghost towns in Colorado
  - List of governors of Colorado
    - Governor of the Territory of Jefferson
    - List of governors of the Territory of Colorado
    - List of governors of the State of Colorado
  - List of high schools in Colorado
  - List of highways in Colorado
    - List of state highways in Colorado
    - List of federal highways in Colorado
    - List of interstate highways in Colorado
  - List of hospitals in Colorado
  - List of individuals executed in Colorado
  - List of insignia of the State of Colorado
  - List of lakes in Colorado
  - List of law enforcement agencies in Colorado
  - List of lieutenant governors of Colorado
  - List of metropolitan areas in Colorado
  - List of military facilities in Colorado
  - List of mountain passes of Colorado
  - List of mountain ranges of Colorado
  - List of mountains of Colorado
    - List of 4000 meter peaks of Colorado
    - List of fourteeners in Colorado
    - List of highest mountain peaks of Colorado
    - List of most isolated mountain peaks of Colorado
    - List of most prominent mountain peaks of Colorado
    - List of mountain peaks of Colorado
  - List of municipalities of Colorado
    - List of Colorado municipalities by county
  - List of museums in Colorado
  - List of natural forests in Colorado
  - List of national grasslands in Colorado
  - List of national historic landmarks in Colorado
  - List of national historic sites in Colorado
  - List of national historic trails in Colorado
  - List of national monuments in Colorado
  - List of national parks in Colorado
  - List of national recreation areas in Colorado
  - List of national recreation trails in Colorado
  - List of National Register of Historic Places in Colorado
  - List of national scenic byways in Colorado
  - List of national scenic trail in Colorado
  - List of national wilderness areas in Colorado
  - List of national wildlife refuges in Colorado
  - List of newspapers in Colorado
  - List of people from Colorado
  - List of places in Colorado
    - List of cities and towns in Colorado
    - List of forts in Colorado
    - List of ghost towns in Colorado
    - List of municipalities in Colorado
    - List of places ranked by per capita income in Colorado
  - List of post offices in Colorado
  - List of power stations in Colorado
  - List of prehistoric sites in Colorado
  - List of professional sports teams of Colorado
    - List of former professional sports teams of Colorado
  - List of radio stations in Colorado
  - List of railroads in Colorado
  - List of Registered Historic Places in Colorado
  - List of reservoirs in Colorado
  - List of rivers of Colorado
  - List of scenic and historic byways in Colorado
  - List of school districts in Colorado
  - List of ski resorts in Colorado
  - List of snakes in Colorado
  - List of state forests of Colorado
  - List of state parks of Colorado
  - List of state prisons of Colorado
  - List of state representatives of Colorado
  - List of state senators of Colorado
  - List of symbols of the State of Colorado
  - List of television stations in Colorado
  - List of trails in Colorado
  - List of United States census statistical areas in Colorado
  - List of Colorado's congressional delegations
  - List of United States congressional districts in Colorado
  - List of United States representatives from Colorado
  - List of United States senators from Colorado
  - List of territorial claims and designations in Colorado
  - List of watersheds in Colorado
- Logan County, Colorado
- Louisiana Purchase of 1803
- Ludlow, Colorado
- Ludlow Massacre

== M ==
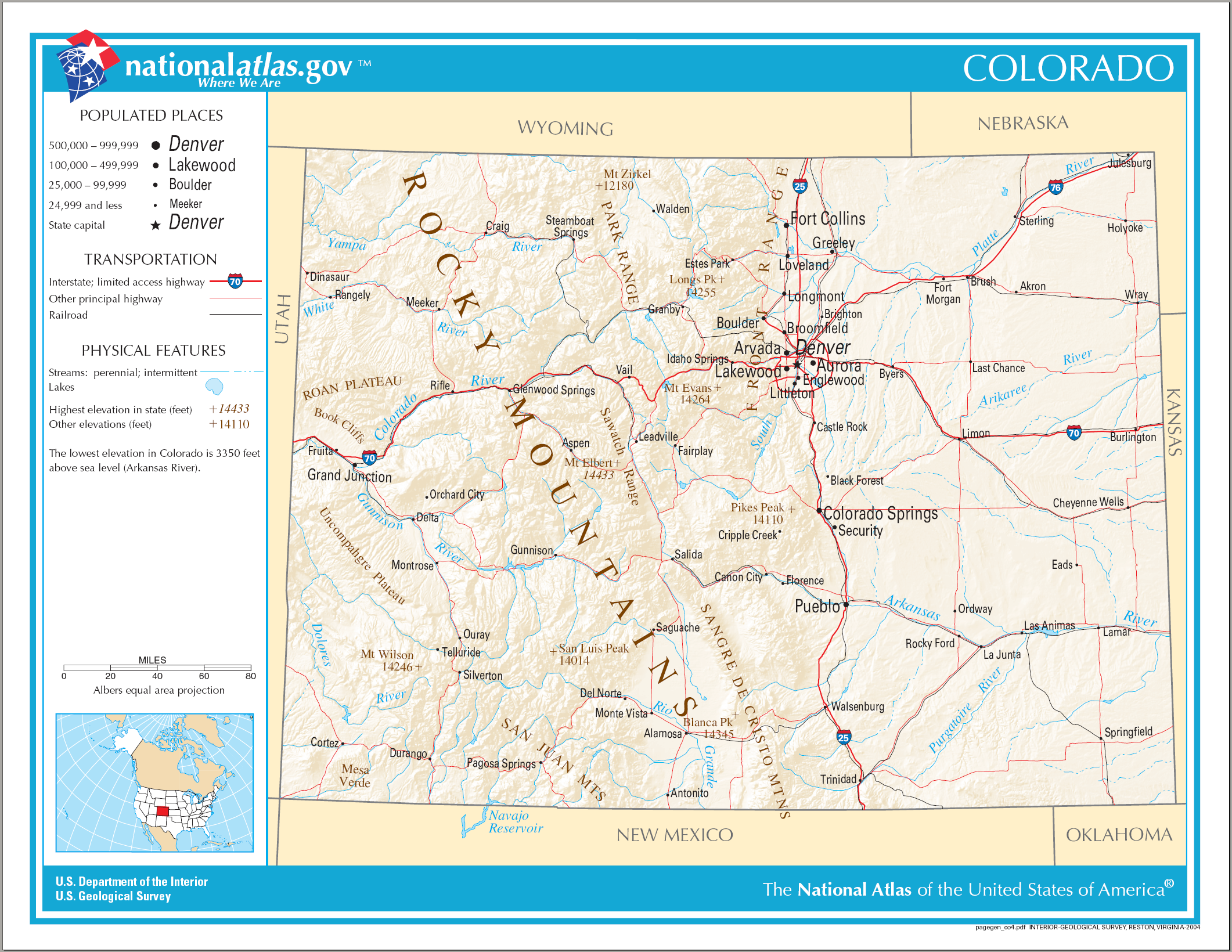
An enlargeable map of the State of Colorado.

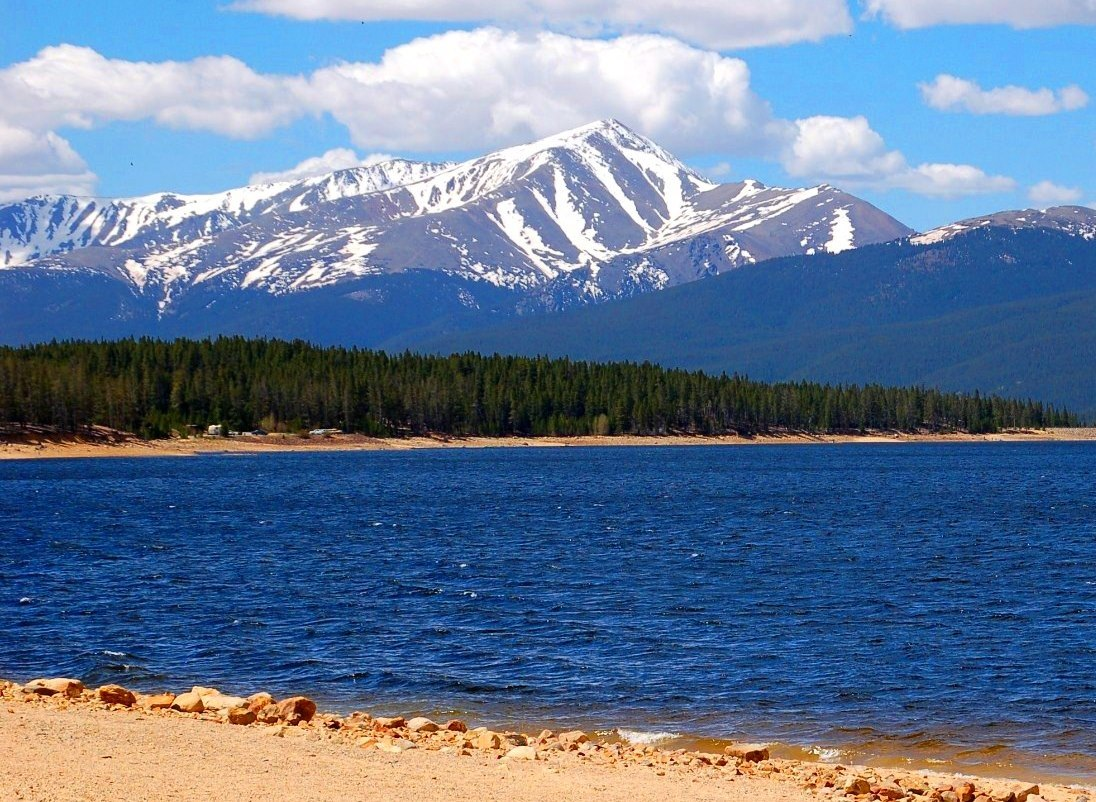
Mount Elbert, 14,440 ft (4,401.2 m)

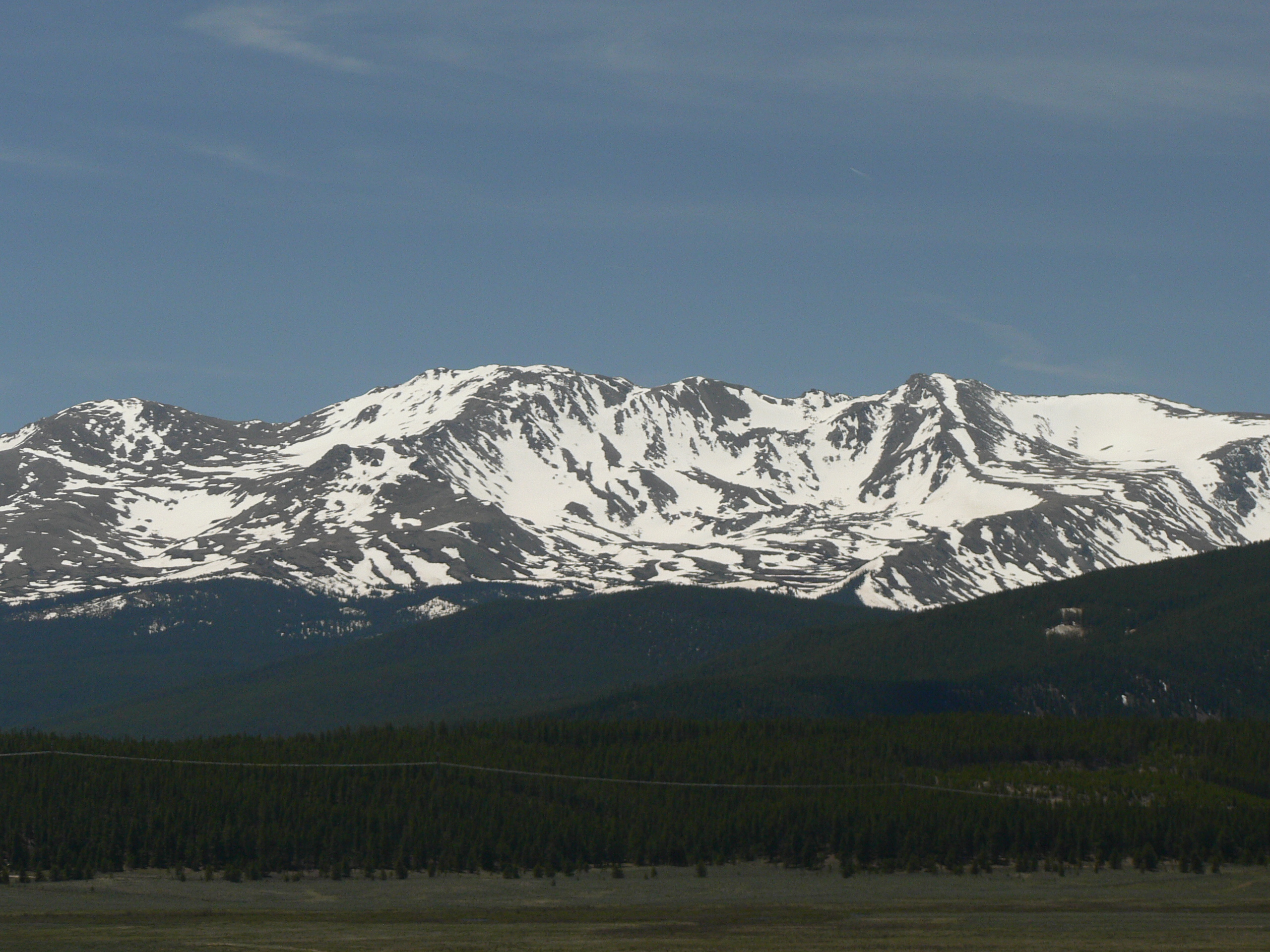
Mount Massive, 14,428 ft (4,398 m)

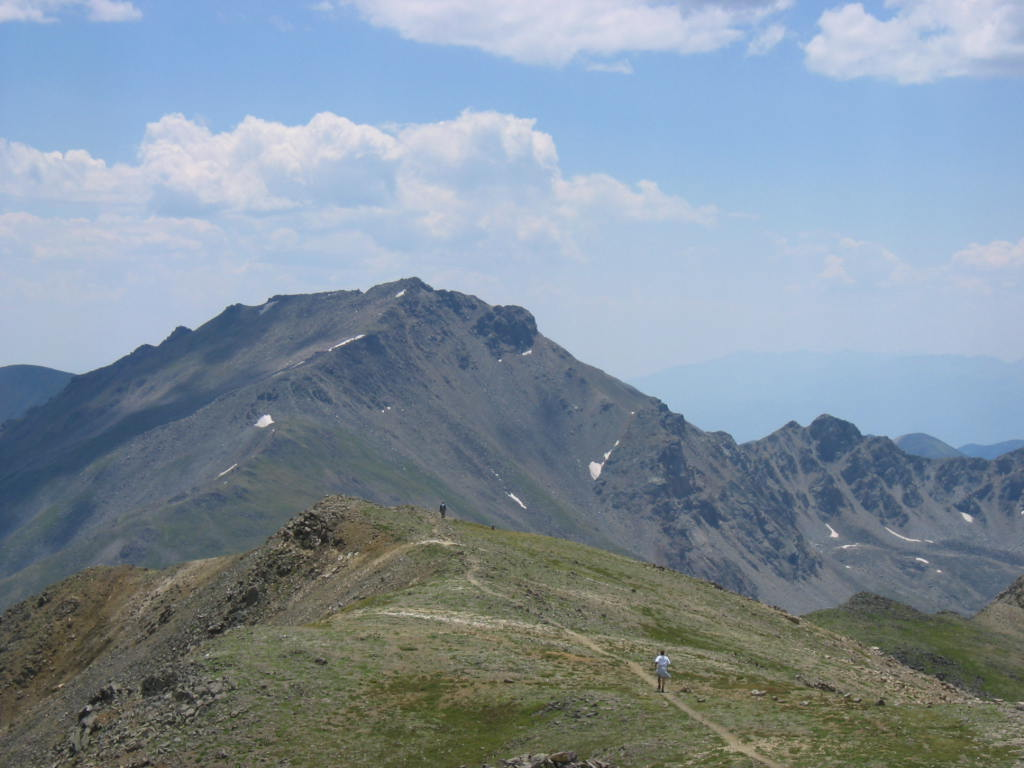
Mount Harvard, 14,421 ft (4,395.6 m)

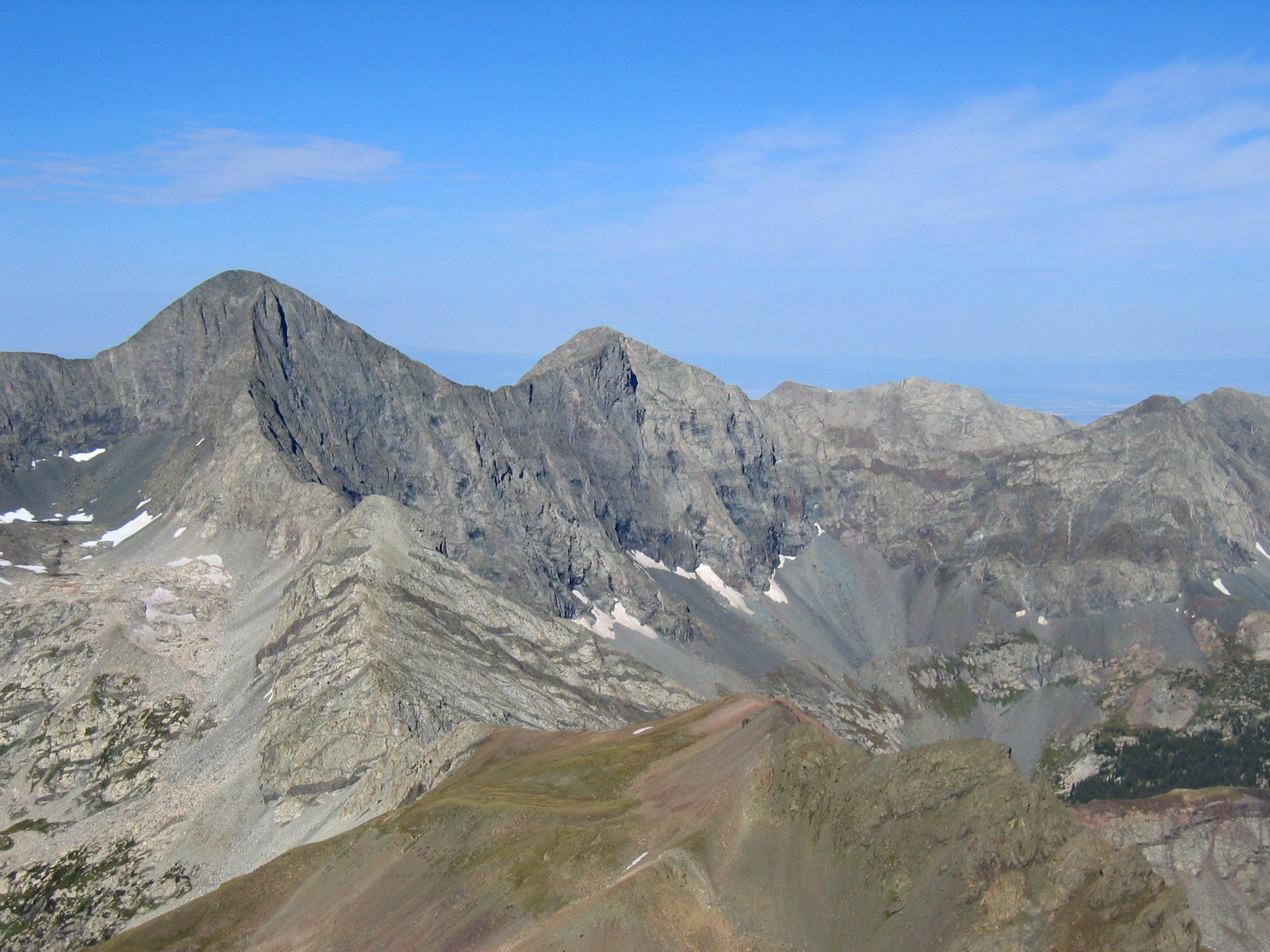
Blanca Peak, 14,351 ft (4,374 m)

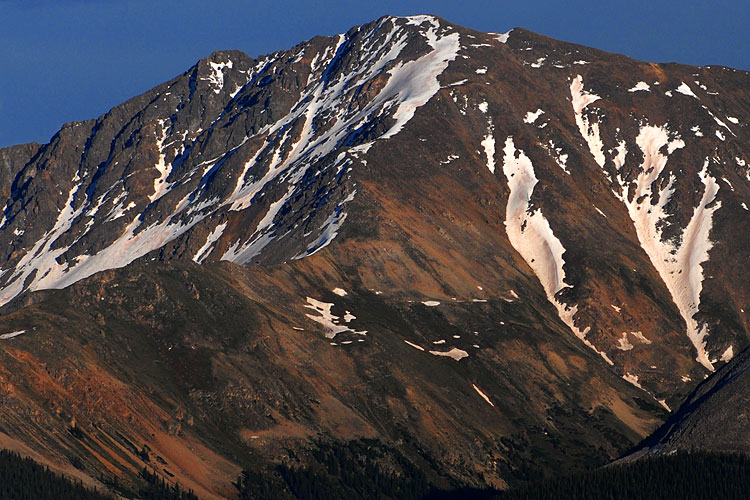
La Plata Peak, 14,343 ft (4,372 m)

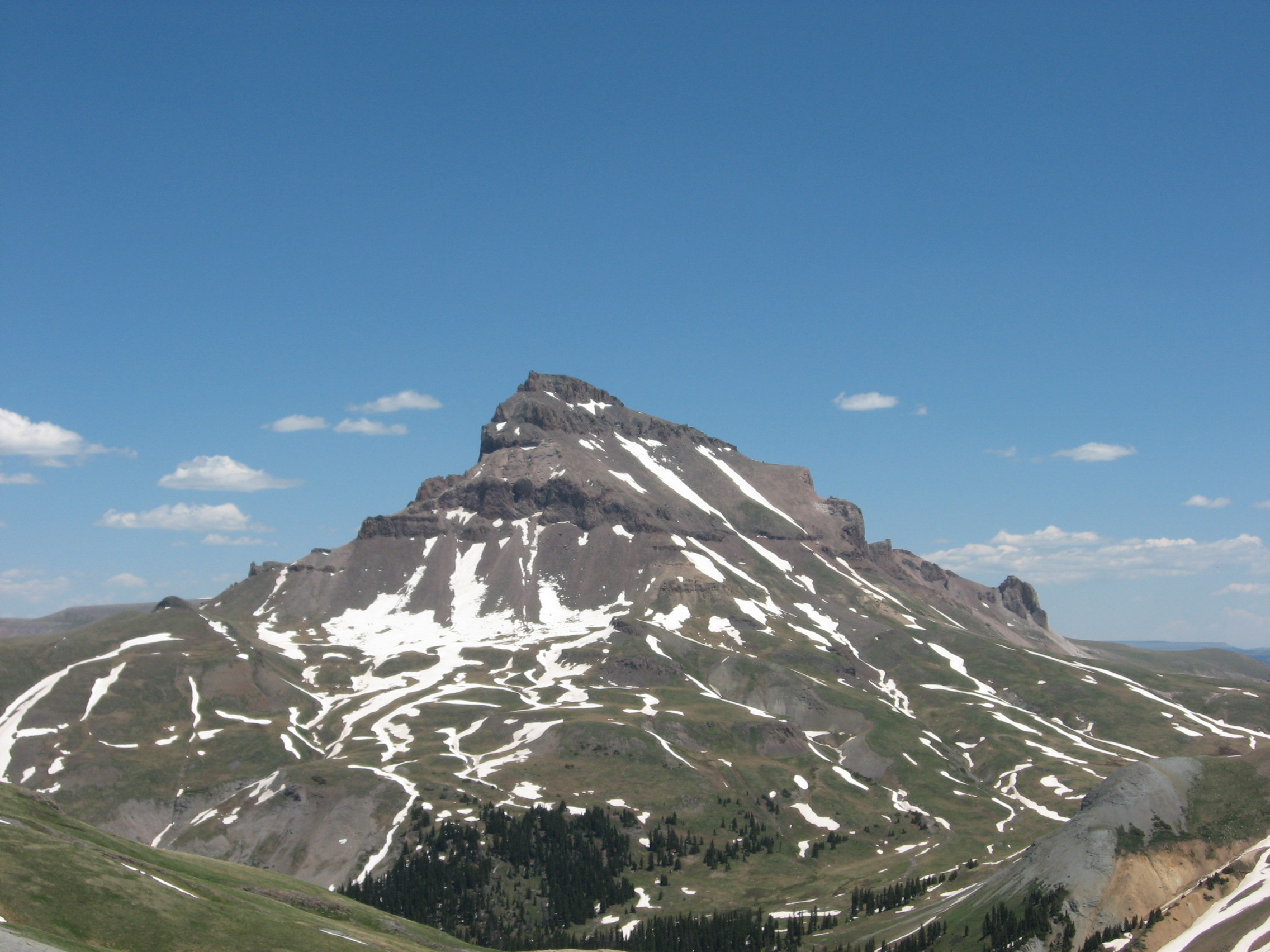
Uncompahgre Peak, 14,321 ft (4,365 m)

- Maps of Colorado
- Mass media in Colorado
- Meeker Massacre
- Mesa County, Colorado
- Metropolitan areas of Colorado
- Military facilities in Colorado
- Glenn Miller
- Mineral Belt of Colorado
- Mineral County, Colorado
- Mines, Colorado School of website
- Mining in Colorado
  - Category:Colorado Mining Boom
    - commons:Category:Colorado Mining Boom
  - Category:Mining communities in Colorado
    - commons:Category:Mining communities in Colorado
  - Coal mining in Colorado
  - Construction aggregate
  - Gold mining in Colorado
    - Pike's Peak Gold Rush
  - Petroleum
    - Natural gas
    - Oil shale
  - Silver mining in Colorado
    - Colorado Silver Boom
  - Uranium mining in Colorado
- David Moffat
- Moffat County, Colorado
- Montana County, Kansas Territory
- Montezuma County, Colorado
- Montrose County, Colorado
- Monuments and memorials in Colorado
  - commons:Category:Monuments and memorials in Colorado
- Mora County, New Mexico Territory
- Morgan County, Colorado
- Most isolated major peaks of Colorado
- Most prominent peaks of Colorado
- Mother of Rivers
- Mountain County, Jefferson Territory
- Mountain passes of Colorado
  - commons:Category:Mountain passes of Colorado
- Mountain peaks of Colorado
  - The 55 Highest major peaks of Colorado
  - The 50 Most prominent peaks of Colorado
  - The 50 Most isolated major peaks of Colorado
  - The 53 14,000-foot peaks of Colorado
  - The 55 4000 meter peaks of Colorado
  - Category:Mountains of Colorado
    - commons:Category:Mountains of Colorado
- Mountain ranges of Colorado
  - commons:Category:Mountain ranges of Colorado
- List of municipalities in Colorado
  - List of Colorado municipalities by county
  - List of city nicknames in Colorado
  - List of county seats in Colorado
    - commons:Category:Cities in Colorado
- Museum Store Company
- Museums in Colorado
  - commons:Category:Museums in Colorado
- Music of Colorado
  - Category:Music of Colorado
    - commons:Category:Music of Colorado
  - Category:Musical groups from Colorado
  - Category:Musicians from Colorado

== N ==
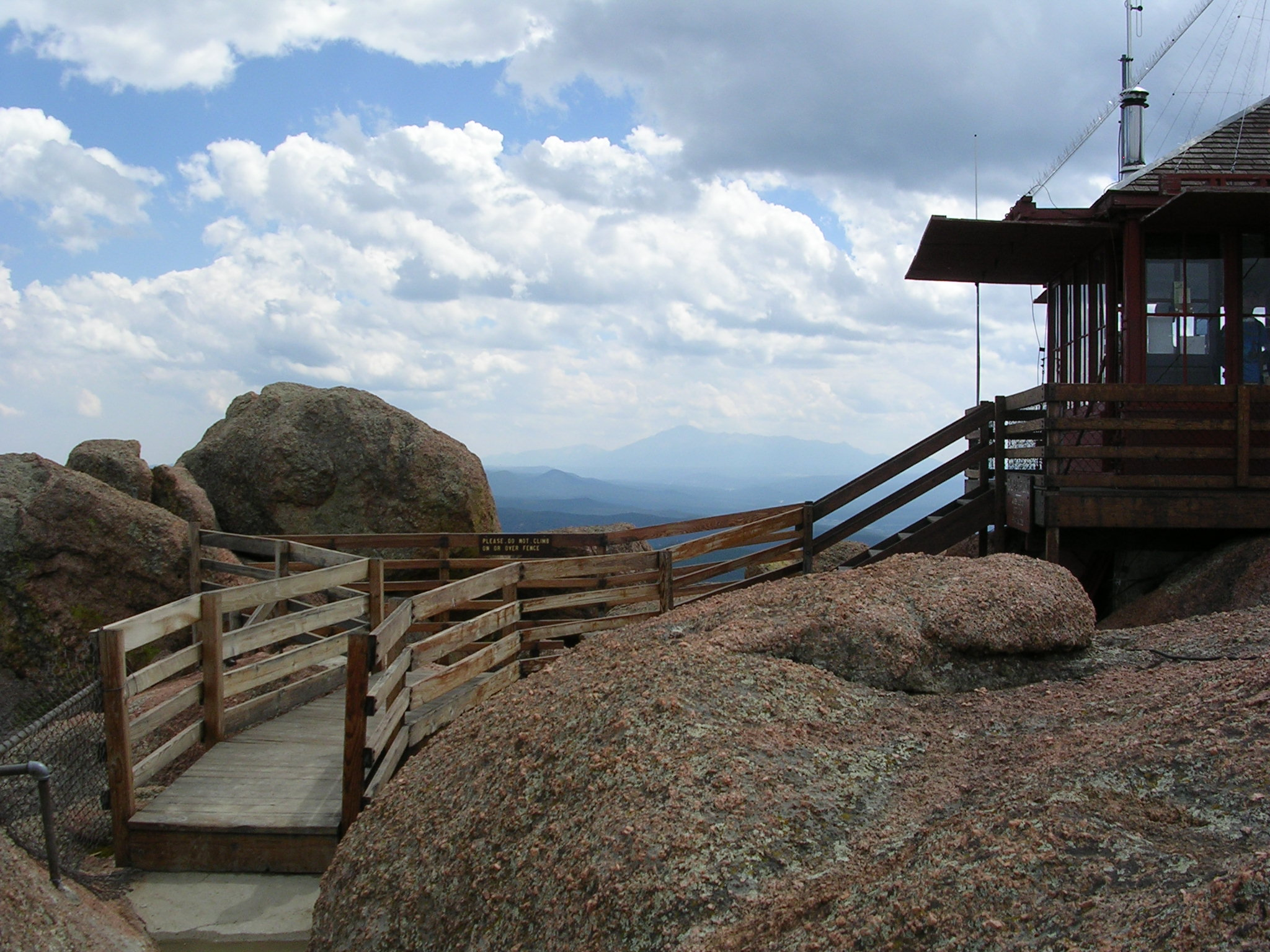
Devils Head Lookout Tower in Pike National Forest

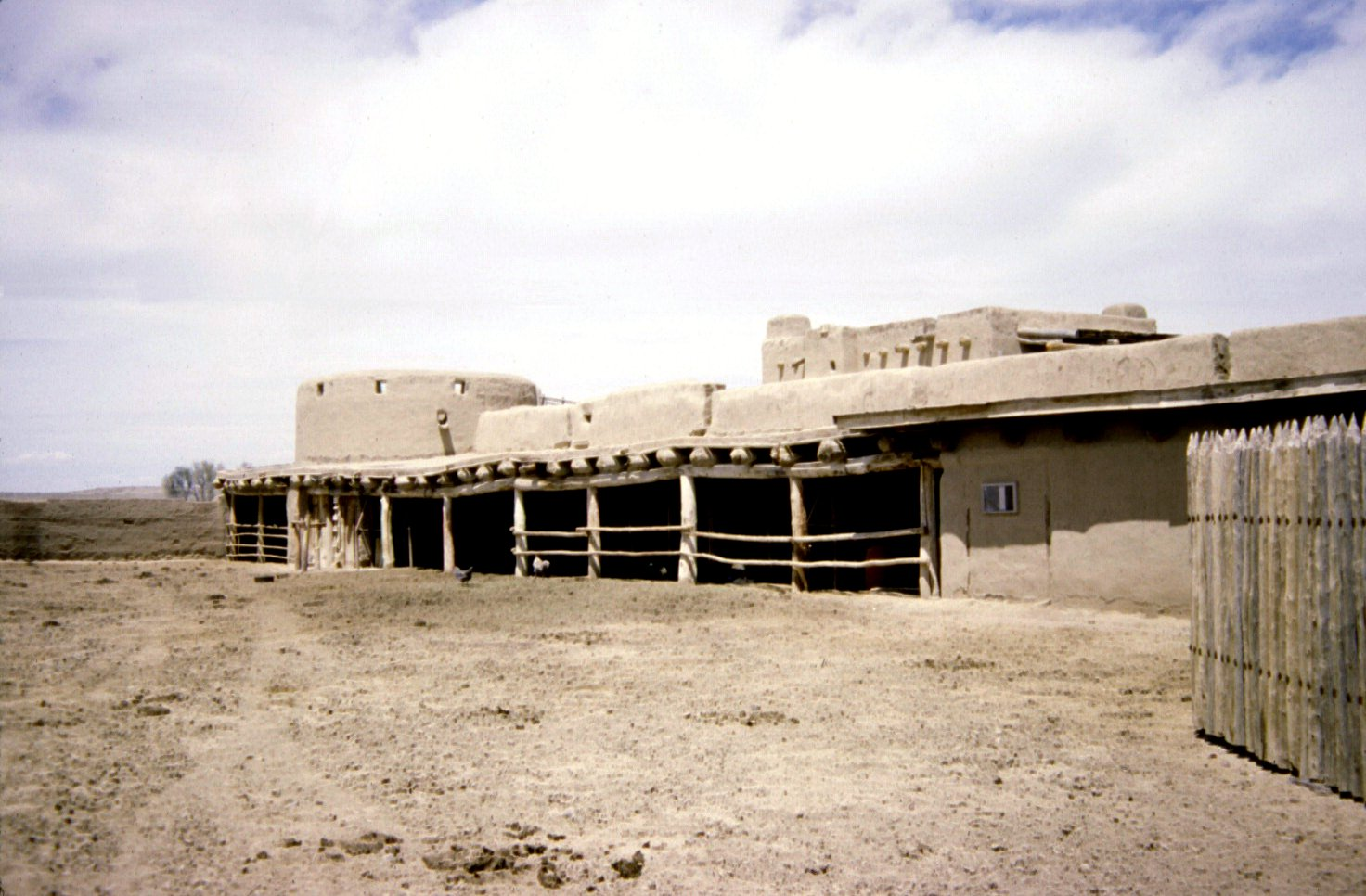
Bent's Old Fort National Historic Site near La Junta, Colorado

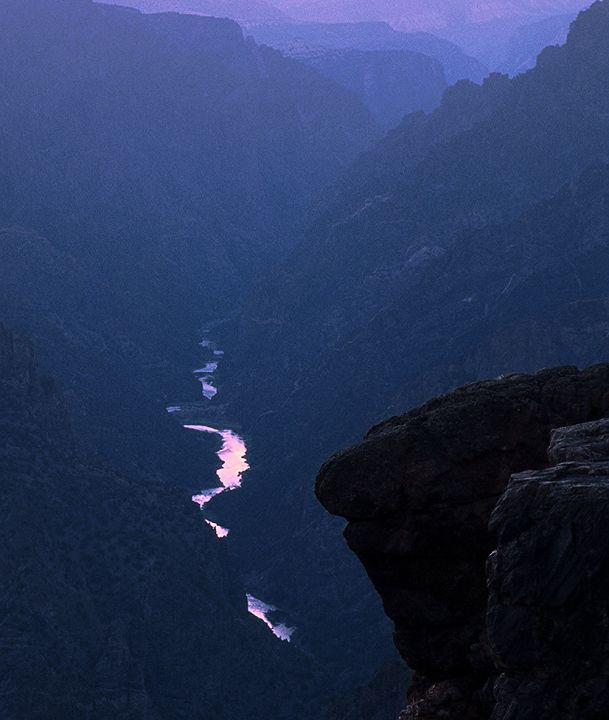
The Gunnison River in Black Canyon of the Gunnison National Park

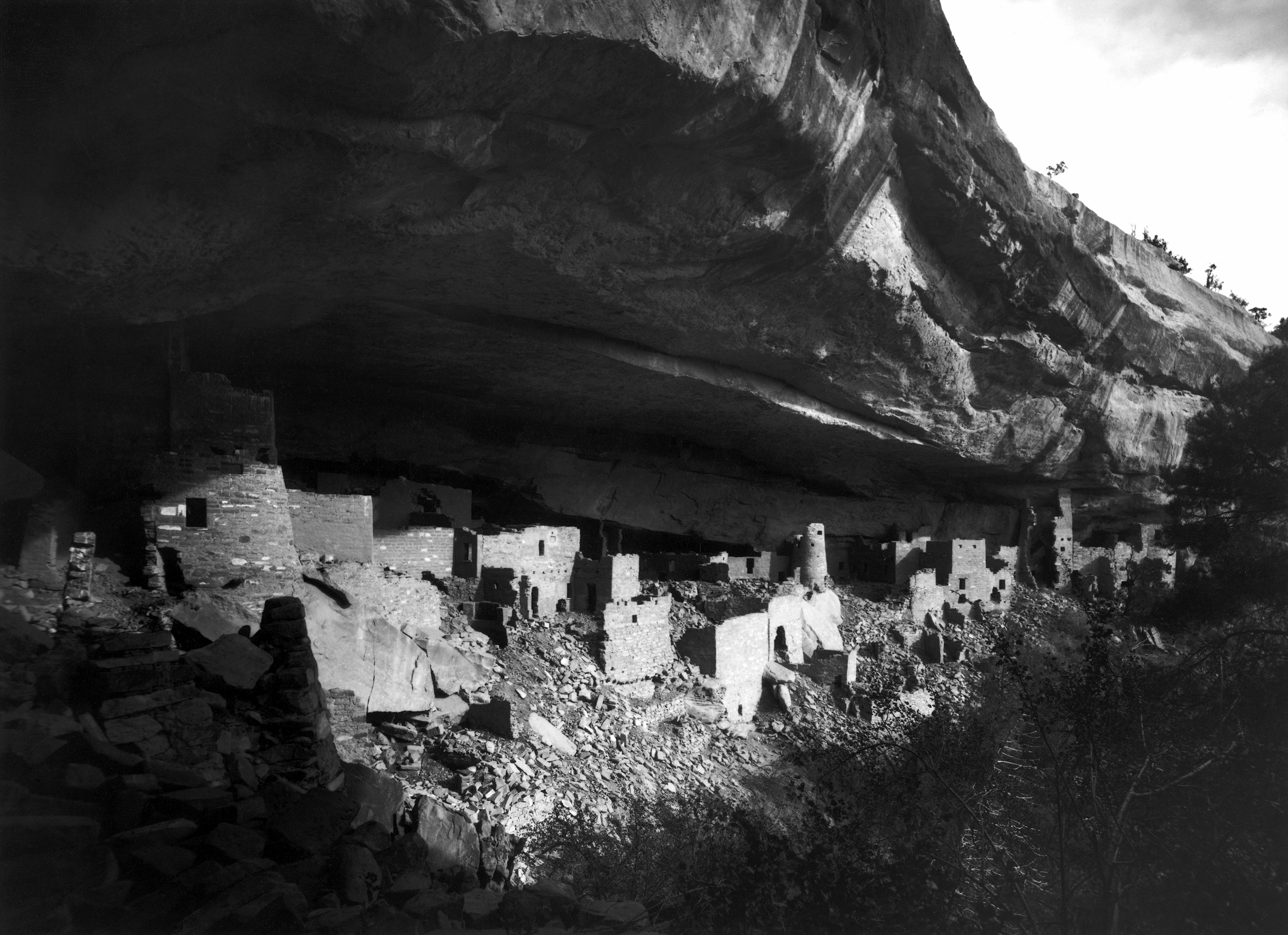
Cliff Palace at Mesa Verde by Gustaf Nordenskiöld in 1891

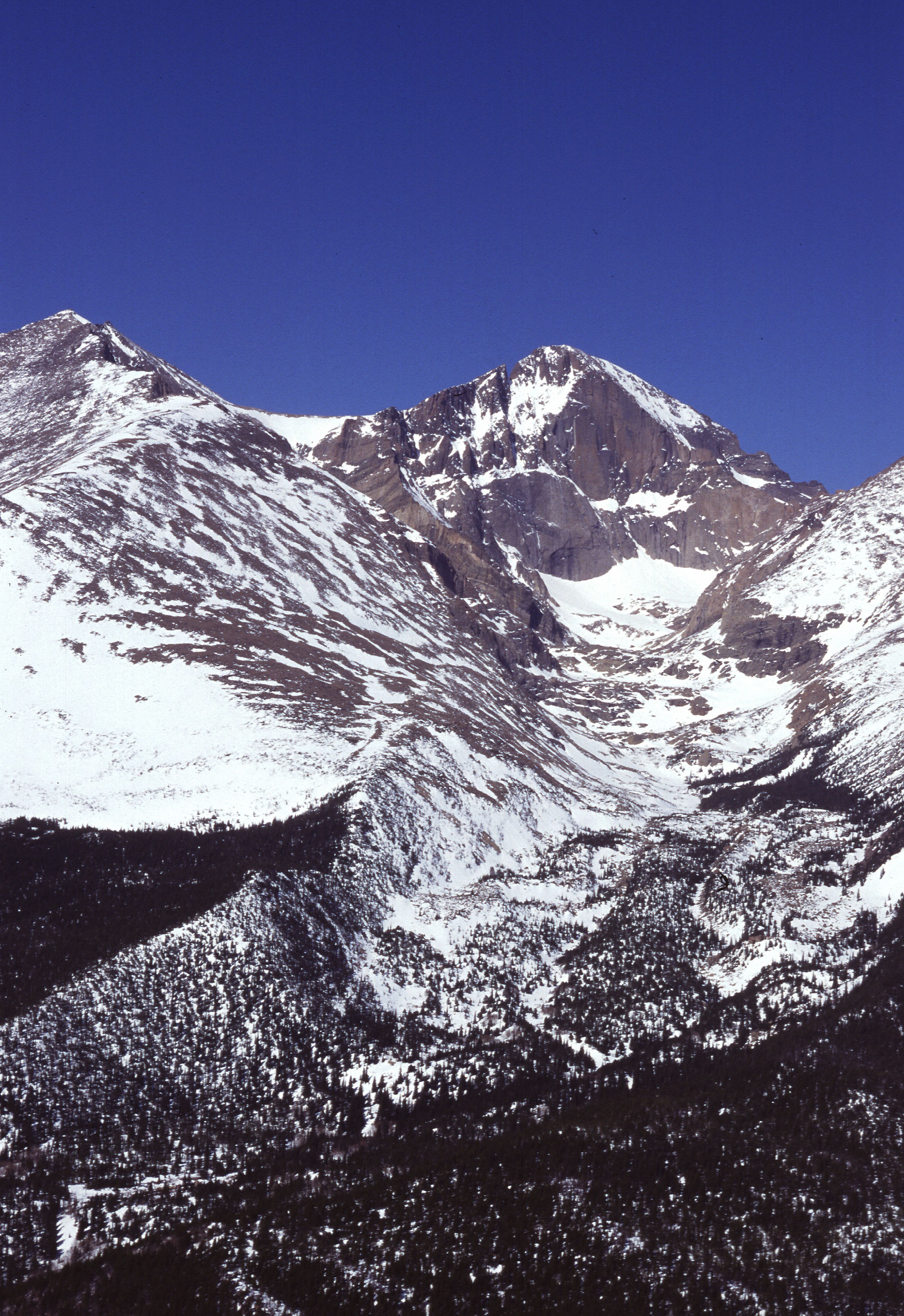
Longs Peak in Rocky Mountain National Park

- National forests of Colorado
  - Arapaho National Forest
  - Grand Mesa National Forest
  - Gunnison National Forest
  - Pike National Forest
  - Rio Grande National Forest
  - Roosevelt National Forest
  - Routt National Forest
  - San Isabel National Forest
  - San Juan National Forest
  - Uncompahgre National Forest
  - White River National Forest
  - Category:National forests of Colorado
    - commons:Category:National Forests of Colorado
- National grasslands of Colorado
  - Comanche National Grassland
  - Pawnee National Grassland
- National historic landmarks of Colorado
  - commons:Category:National Historic Landmarks in Colorado
- National historic sites of Colorado
  - Bent's Old Fort National Historic Site
  - Sand Creek Massacre National Historic Site
  - commons:Category:National Historic Sites of Colorado
- National historic trails of Colorado
  - Old Spanish National Historic Trail
  - Pony Express National Historic Trail
  - Santa Fe National Historic Trail
- National Ice Core Laboratory
- National Mining Hall of Fame
- National monuments of Colorado
  - Canyons of the Ancients National Monument
  - Colorado National Monument
  - Dinosaur National Monument
  - Florissant Fossil Beds National Monument
  - Hovenweep National Monument
  - Yucca House National Monument
  - commons:Category:National Monuments of Colorado
- National parks of Colorado
  - Black Canyon of the Gunnison National Park
  - Great Sand Dunes National Park and Preserve
  - Mesa Verde National Park and UNESCO World Heritage Site
  - Rocky Mountain National Park
  - commons:Category:National Parks of Colorado
- National recreation areas of Colorado
  - Arapaho National Recreation Area
  - Curecanti National Recreation Area
- National Register of Historic Places in Colorado
  - commons:Category:Registered Historic Places in Colorado
- National recreation trails of Colorado
- National scenic trail of Colorado
  - Continental Divide National Scenic Trail
- National Western Stock Show
- National wilderness areas of Colorado
- National wildlife refuges of Colorado
  - Alamosa National Wildlife Refuge
  - Arapaho National Wildlife Refuge
  - Baca National Wildlife Refuge
  - Browns Park National Wildlife Refuge
  - Monte Vista National Wildlife Refuge
  - Rocky Mountain Arsenal National Wildlife Refuge
  - Two Ponds National Wildlife Refuge
- Native American peoples of Colorado
- Natural arches of Colorado
  - commons:Category:Natural arches of Colorado
- Natural gas pipelines in Colorado
- Natural history of Colorado
  - commons:Category:Natural history of Colorado
- New Mexico Meridian
- Newspapers of Colorado
- Nil sine numine - Colorado state motto
- Gustaf Nordenskiöld
- North Central Colorado Urban Area
- North County, Jefferson Territory
- North Front Range Metropolitan Planning Organization website
- North Platte River

== O ==
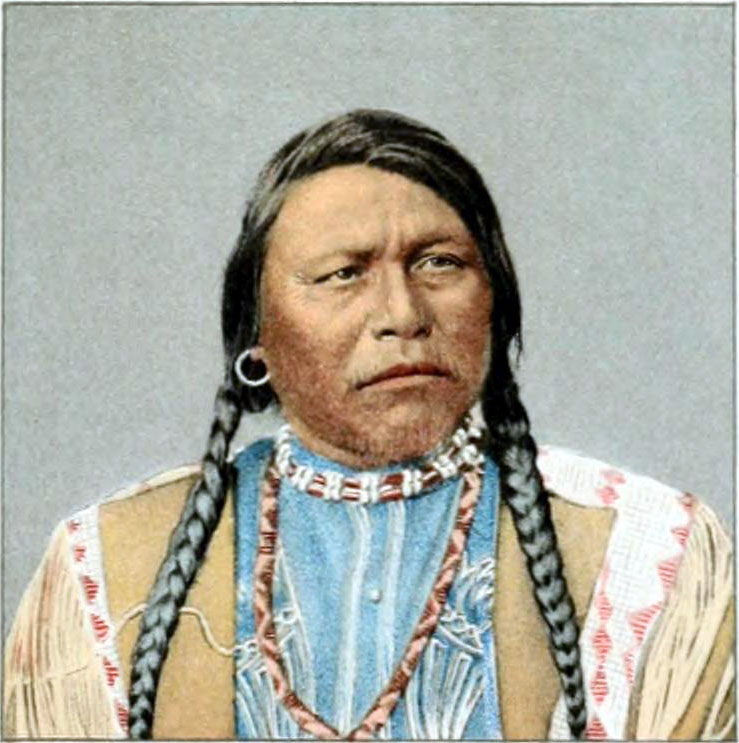
Ouray, a chief of the Ute Nation

- Occupational education in Colorado website
  - commons:Category:Universities and colleges in Colorado
- Oncorhynchus clarki stomias - Colorado state fish
- Oro County, Kansas Territory
- Otero County, Colorado
- Ouray
- Ouray County, Colorado
- Ovis canadensis canadensis - Colorado state mammal

== P ==
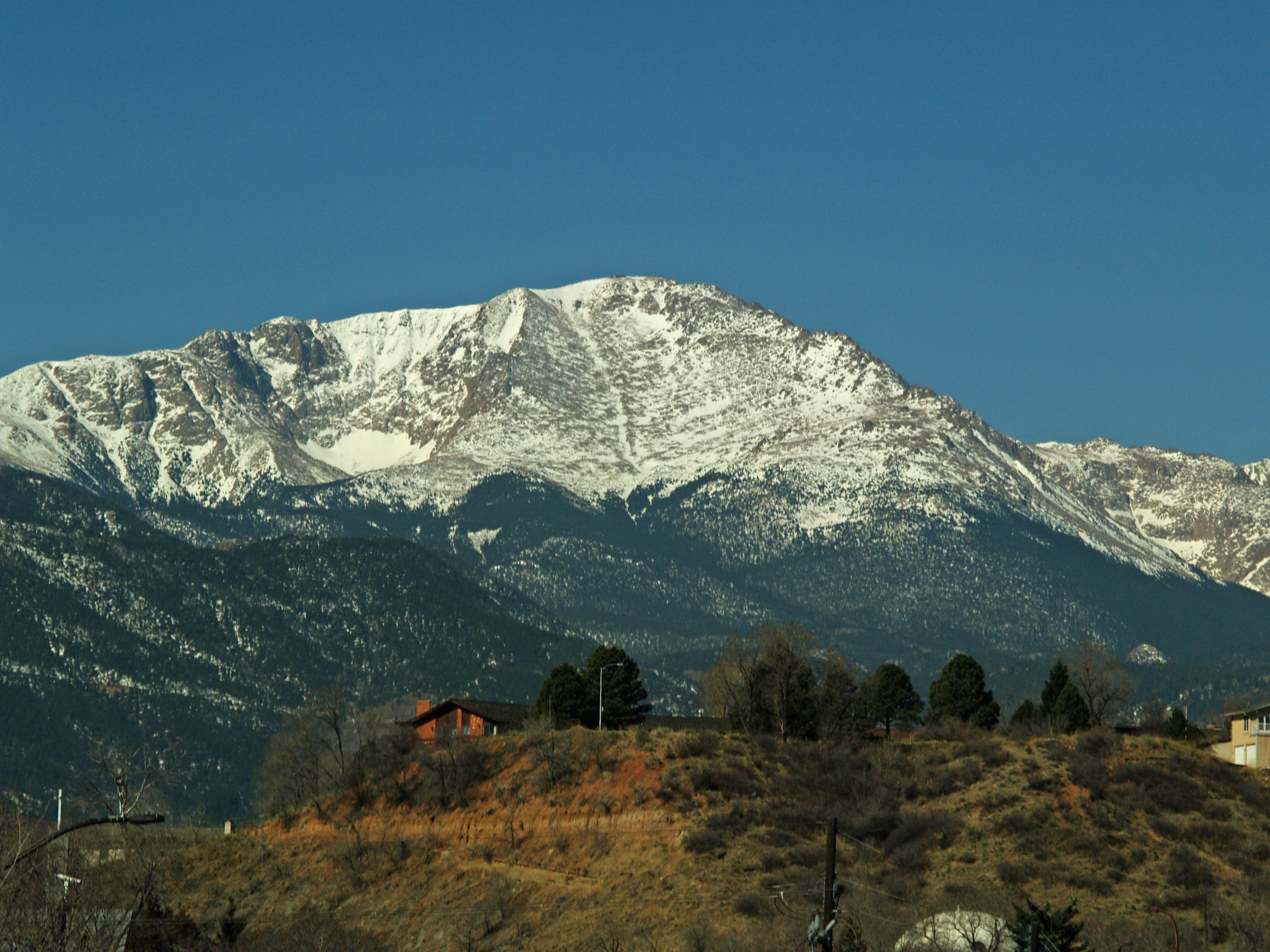
Pikes Peak, 14,115 ft (4,302.31 m)

- William Jackson Palmer
- Park County, Colorado
- Park County, Jefferson Territory
- Trey Parker
- Peketon County, Kansas Territory
- People from Colorado
  - Category:People from Colorado
    - commons:Category:People from Colorado
    - Category:People from Colorado by populated place
    - Category:People from Colorado by county
    - Category:People from Colorado by occupation
- Pepsi Center
- Phantom Canyon (Fort Collins Area)
- Phillips County, Colorado
- Picea pungens (Colorado blue spruce) - Colorado state tree
- Pike's Peak Country
- Pike's Peak Gold Rush
- Pikes Peak
- Pitkin County, Colorado
- List of places in Colorado
  - List of forts in Colorado
  - List of ghost towns in Colorado
  - List of populated places in Colorado
    - List of populated places in Colorado by county
    - List of census-designated places in Colorado
    - Colorado metropolitan areas
    - List of municipalities in Colorado
      - List of Colorado municipalities by county
    - List of post offices in Colorado
    - List of statistical areas in Colorado
    - Category:Unincorporated communities in Colorado
- Platte County, Colorado Territory
- Politics of Colorado
  - Category:Politics of Colorado
    - commons:Category:Politics of Colorado
- Professional sports in Colorado
- Pronghorn
- Protected areas of Colorado
  - commons:Category:Protected areas of Colorado
- Prowers County, Colorado
- Public Utilities Commission of the State of Colorado website
- Pueblo County, Colorado

== Q ==
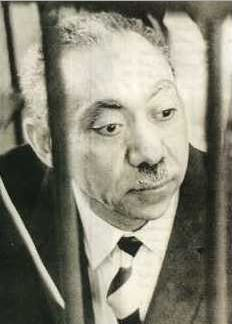
Sayyid 'Ibrāhīm Ḥusayn Quṭb

- Sayyid Qutb

== R ==
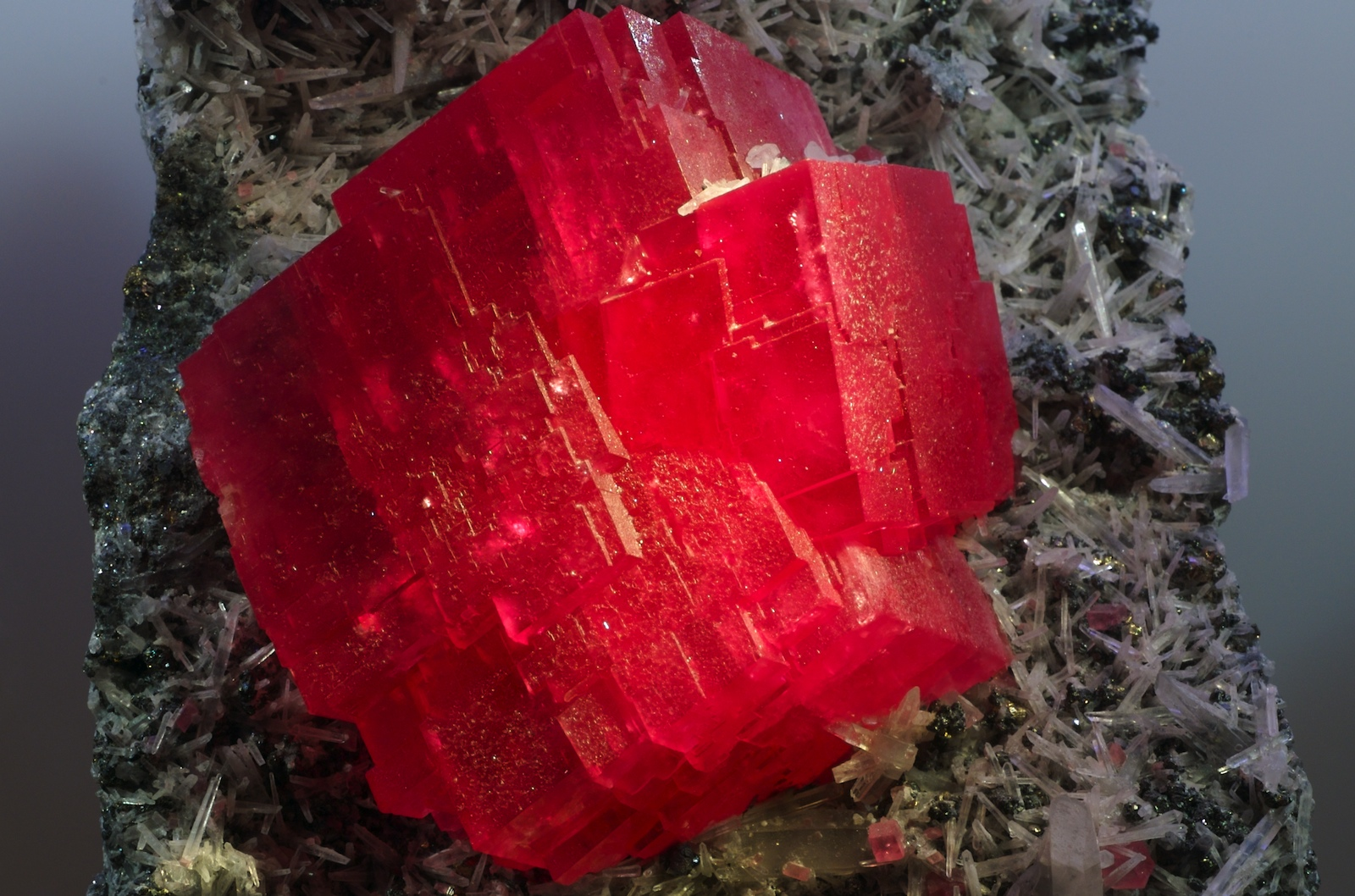
Native Colorado rhodochrosite

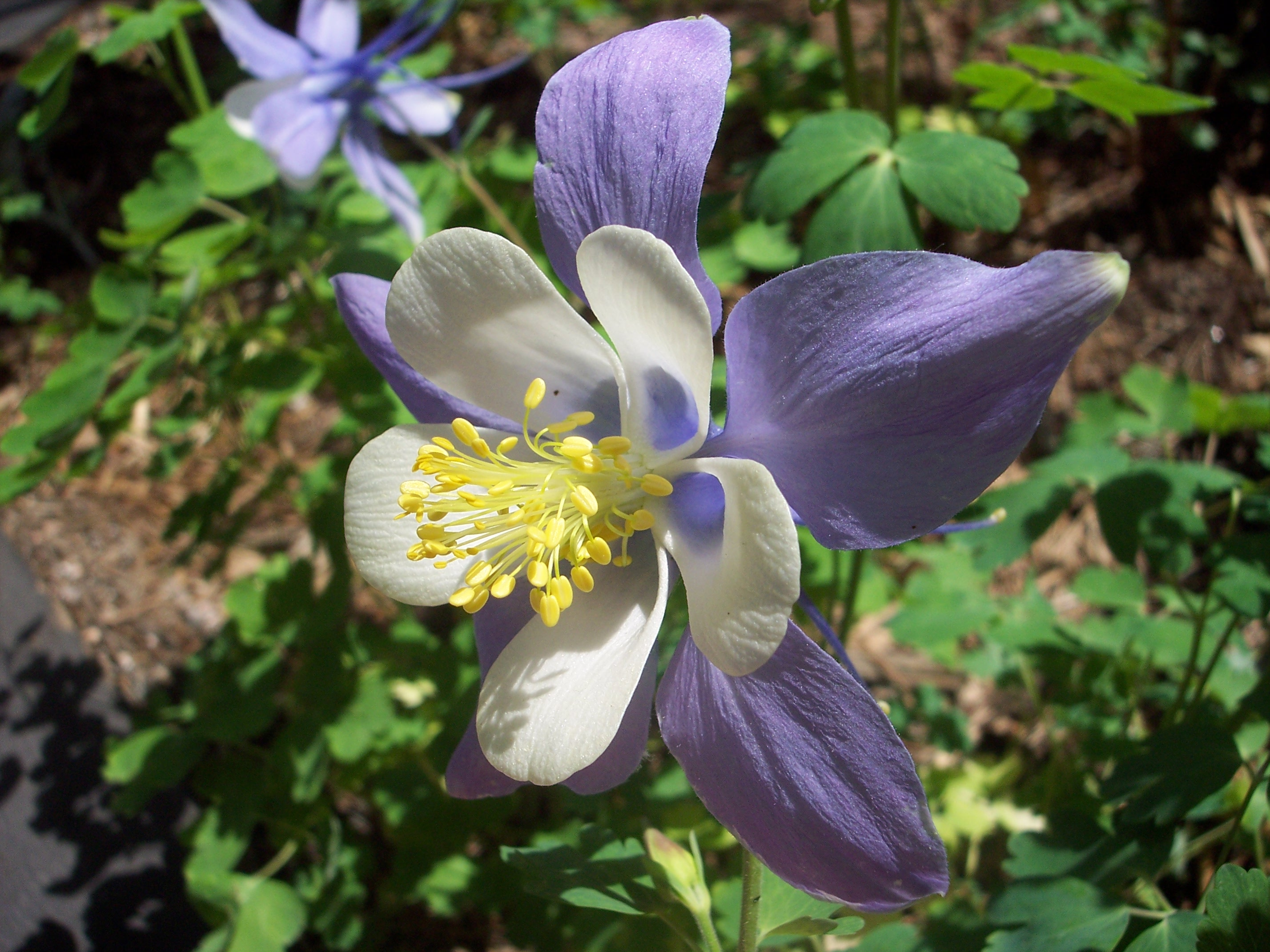
Native Colorado Rocky Mountain columbine

- Radio stations in Colorado
- Railroad museums in Colorado
  - commons:Category:Railroad museums in Colorado
- Railroads in Colorado
- Rangeview Library District
- Regional Transportation District website
- Registered historic places of Colorado
  - commons:Category:Registered Historic Places in Colorado
- Religion in Colorado
- REMP
  - Category:Religion in Colorado
- Rhodochrosite - Colorado state mineral
- Rio Blanco County, Colorado
- Rio Grande
- Rio Grande County, Colorado
- Rivers of Colorado
  - commons:Category:Rivers of Colorado
- Rock formations in Colorado
  - commons:Category:Rock formations in Colorado
- Rocky Mountain bighorn sheep - Colorado state mammal
- Rocky Mountain columbine - Colorado state flower
- Rocky Mountain Empire
- "Rocky Mountain High" - Colorado state song
- Rocky Mountain oysters
- Rocky Mountains
- Stuart Roosa
- Routt County, Colorado
- Karl Rove

== S ==
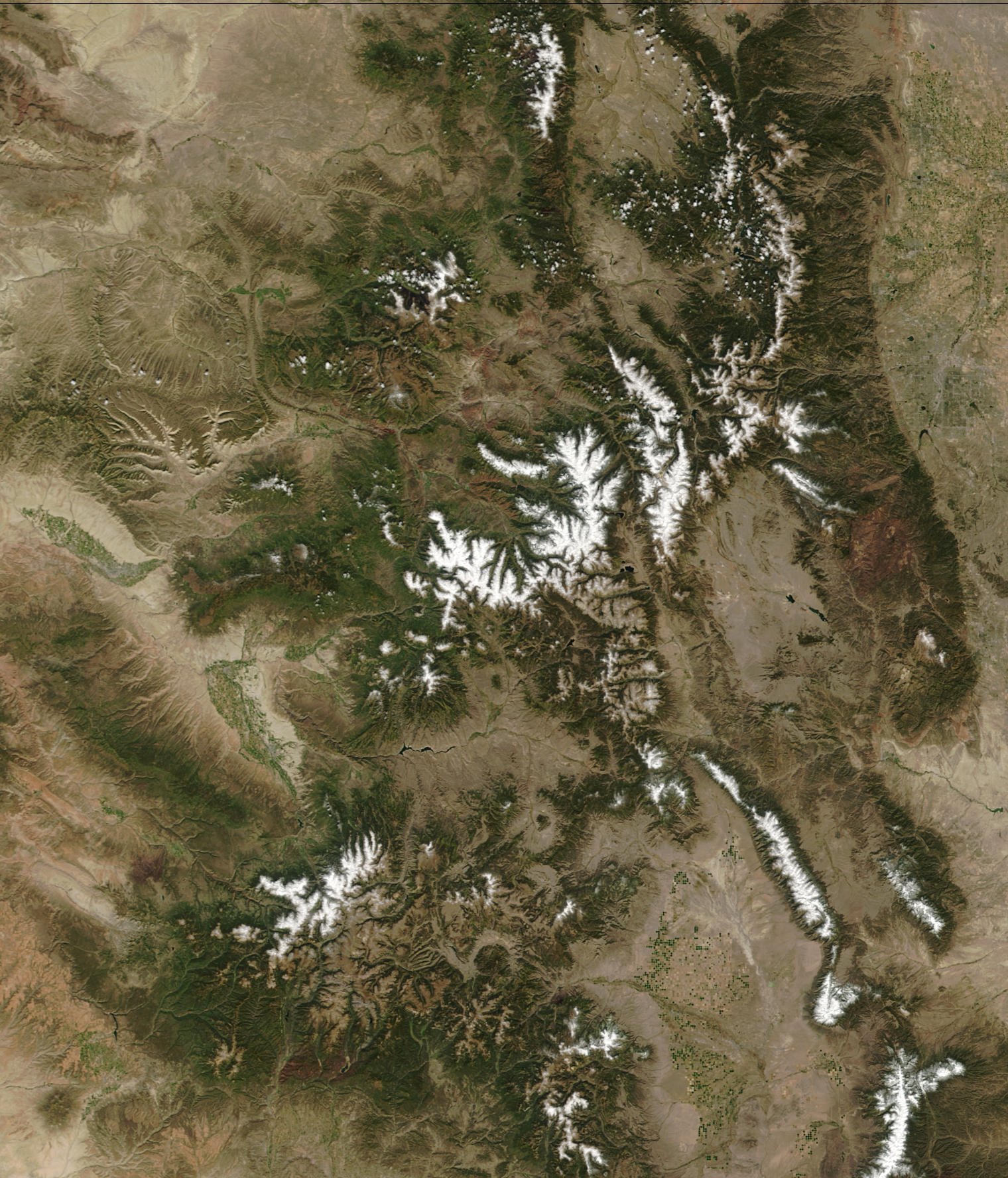
A satellite image of the Southern Rocky Mountains in Colorado

- Saguache County, Colorado
- Ceran Saint-Vrain
- Saint Charles Reservoir
- St. Vrain County, Jefferson Territory
- San Juan County, Colorado
- San Miguel County, Colorado
- Sand Creek Massacre
  - Sand Creek Massacre National Historic Site website
- Sanpete County, Utah Territory
- Saratoga County, Jefferson Territory
- Scenic byways of Colorado
- School districts of Colorado
- School of Mines, Colorado website
- Scientific and Cultural Facilities District website
- Scouting in Colorado
- Seal of the State of Colorado
- Secretary of the State of Colorado website
- Sedgwick County, Colorado
- Seitz - Colorado state soil
- Senate of the State of Colorado
- Settlements - see List of populated places in Colorado
- Shoshone Nation of Native Americans
- Silver Boom of Colorado
- Silver mining in Colorado
- Sixteenth Street Mall
- Sixth Principal Meridian
- Ski resorts of Colorado website
  - Category:Ski areas and resorts in Colorado
    - commons:Category:Ski areas and resorts in Colorado
- Snakes of Colorado
- Solar power in Colorado
- South Arapahoe County, Colorado (Note: The name of South Arapahoe County, Colorado, was changed back to Arapahoe County on April 11, 1903.)
- South Central Colorado Urban Area
- South Platte River
- South Park
- South Park (Park County, Colorado)
- South Park (Saguache County, Colorado)
- South Park City
- South Park National Heritage Area
- Southern Rocky Mountains
- Special districts of Colorado website
- Sports in Colorado
  - Category:Sports in Colorado
    - commons:Category:Sports in Colorado
  - Category:Sports venues in Colorado
    - commons:Category:Sports venues in Colorado
- Sports Authority Field at Mile High
- Square dance - Colorado state folk dance
- State capital of Colorado website
- State Capitol of Colorado website
- State highways of Colorado website
- State of Colorado website
  - Constitution of the State of Colorado website
  - Government of the State of Colorado
    - Category:Government of Colorado
      - commons:Category:Government of Colorado
    - Executive branch of the government of the State of Colorado website
      - Governor of the State of Colorado website
        - Colorado Department of Agriculture (CDA) website
        - Colorado Department of Corrections (CDOC) website
        - Colorado Department of Education (CDE) website
        - Colorado Department of Higher Education (CDHE) website
        - Colorado Department of Human Services (CDHS) website
        - Colorado Department of Military and Veterans Affairs (DMVA) website
          - Colorado Air National Guard website
          - Colorado Army National Guard website
        - Colorado Department of Natural Resources (CDNR) website
          - Colorado Division of Forestry website
          - Colorado State Parks website
          - Colorado Public Utilities Commission (CPUC) website
        - Colorado Department of Revenue (DOR) website
        - Colorado Department of Transportation (CDOT) website
      - Lieutenant Governor of the State of Colorado website
      - Secretary of the State of Colorado website
        - Colorado Department of State (DOS) website
      - Attorney General of the State of Colorado website
      - Treasurer of the State of Colorado website
    - Legislative branch of the government of the State of Colorado website
      - General Assembly of the State of Colorado website
        - Senate of the State of Colorado
        - House of Representatives of the State of Colorado
    - Judicial branch of the government of the State of Colorado website
      - Supreme Court of the State of Colorado website
        - Court of Appeals of the State of Colorado website
- State of Deseret
- State parks of Colorado website
  - commons:Category:State parks of Colorado
- State Patrol of Colorado website
- State prisons of Colorado
- State representatives of Colorado
- State senators of Colorado
- Stegosaurus - Colorado state fossil
- Matt Stone
- Structures in Colorado
  - commons:Category:Buildings and structures in Colorado
- Summit County, Colorado
- Superfund sites in Colorado
- Supreme Court of the State of Colorado website
- Jack Swigert
- Symbols of the State of Colorado
  - Category:Symbols of Colorado
    - commons:Category:Symbols of Colorado

== T ==
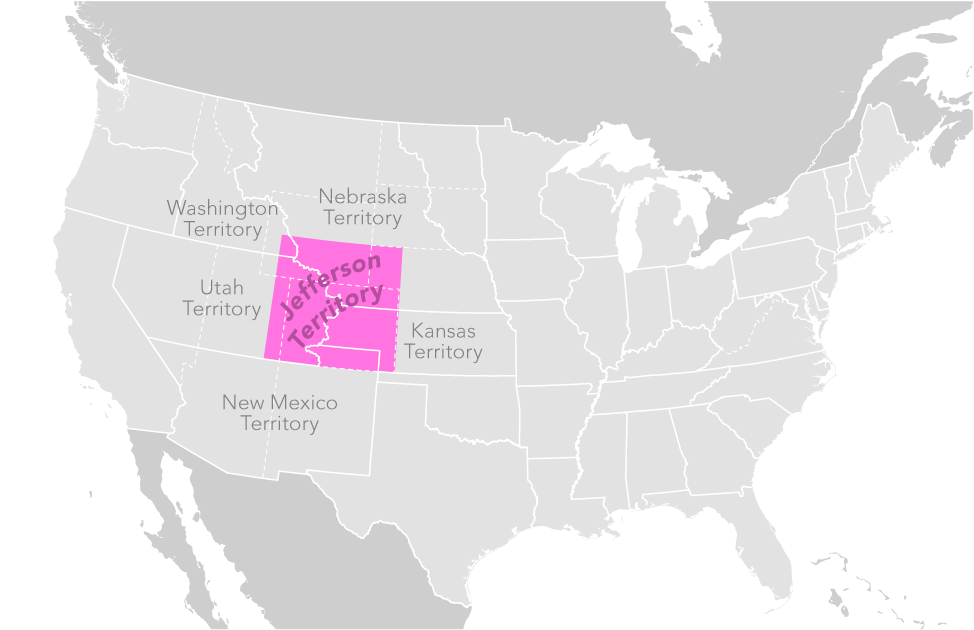
Map of the Territory of Jefferson.

Map of the Territory of Colorado in 1861.

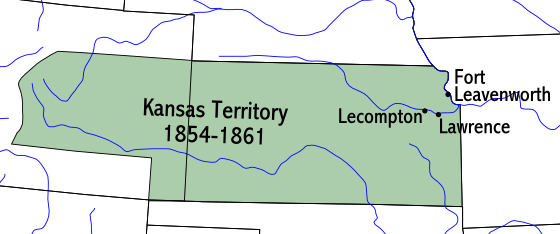
Map of the Territory of Kansas.

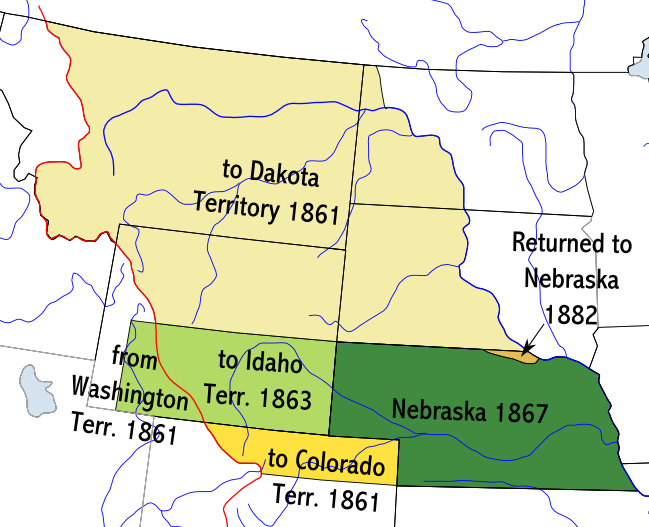
Map of the Territory of Nebraska.

Map of the Territory of New Mexico in 1852.

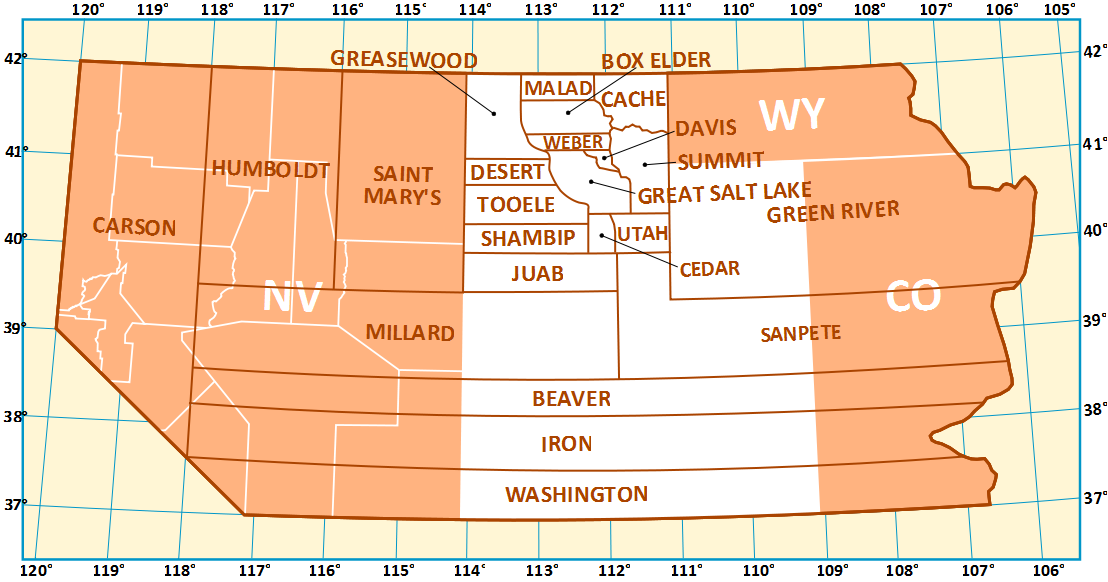
Map of the Territory of Utah in 1856.

- Table of Colorado municipalities by county
- Horace Tabor
- Taos County, New Mexico Territory
- Telecommunications in Colorado
  - commons:Category:Communications in Colorado
- Telephone area codes in Colorado
- Television shows set in Colorado
- Television stations in Colorado
- Teller County, Colorado
- Tenth Mountain Division
- Territory of Colorado, 1861–1876
- Territory of Jefferson, 1859–1861
- Territory of Kansas, 1854–1861
- Territory of Louisiana, 1805–1812
- Territory of Missouri, 1812–1821
- Territory of Nebraska, (1854–1861)-1867
- Territory of New Mexico, (1850–1861)-1912
- Territory of Utah, (1850–1861)-1896
- Nikola Tesla
- Theatres in Colorado
  - commons:Category:Theatres in Colorado
- Thirty-eighth parallel north
- Thirty-ninth parallel north
- Thirty-seventh parallel north
- Timberline
- Tourism in Colorado website
  - commons:Category:Tourism in Colorado
- Towns - see List of municipalities in Colorado
- Trails of Colorado
- Transportation in Colorado
  - Category:Transportation in Colorado
    - commons:Category:Transport in Colorado
- Treasurer of the State of Colorado website
- Treaty of Guadalupe Hidalgo of 1848

== U ==
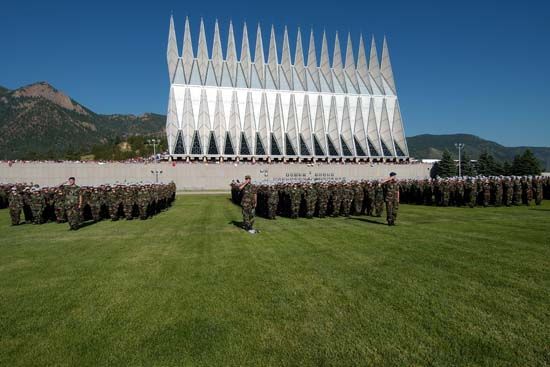
The United States Air Force Academy

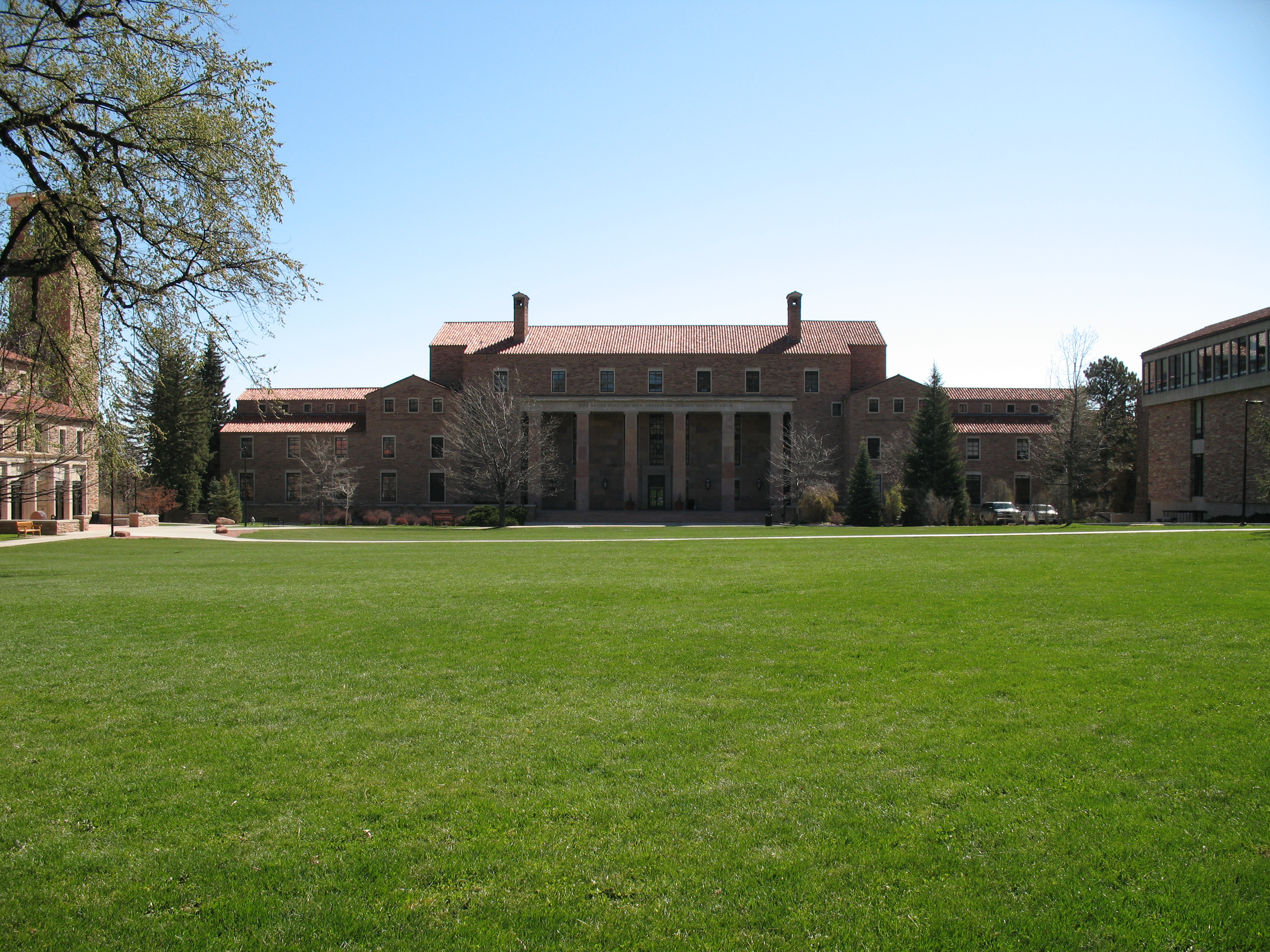
The University of Colorado at Boulder

- Ultra prominent peaks of Colorado
- Uncompaghre County, Colorado (Note: The name of Uncompaghre County, Colorado, was changed back to Ouray County on March 2, 1883.)
- United States Air Force Academy website
- United States of America
  - States of the United States of America
  - United States census statistical areas of Colorado
  - Colorado's congressional delegations
  - United States congressional districts in Colorado
  - United States Court of Appeals for the Tenth Circuit
  - United States District Court for the District of Colorado
  - United States representatives from Colorado
  - United States senators from Colorado
- United States Olympic Committee
  - United States Olympic Training Center in Colorado Springs
- Universities and colleges in Colorado
  - commons:Category:Universities and colleges in Colorado
- University of Colorado System website
- Unsinkable Margaret Brown
- Uranium mining in Colorado
- US-CO – ISO 3166-2:US region code for the State of Colorado
- Utah County, Utah Territory
- Ute Meridian
- Ute Nation of Native Americans

== V ==
- Victor-American Fuel Company
- Victor American Hastings Mine Disaster

== W ==
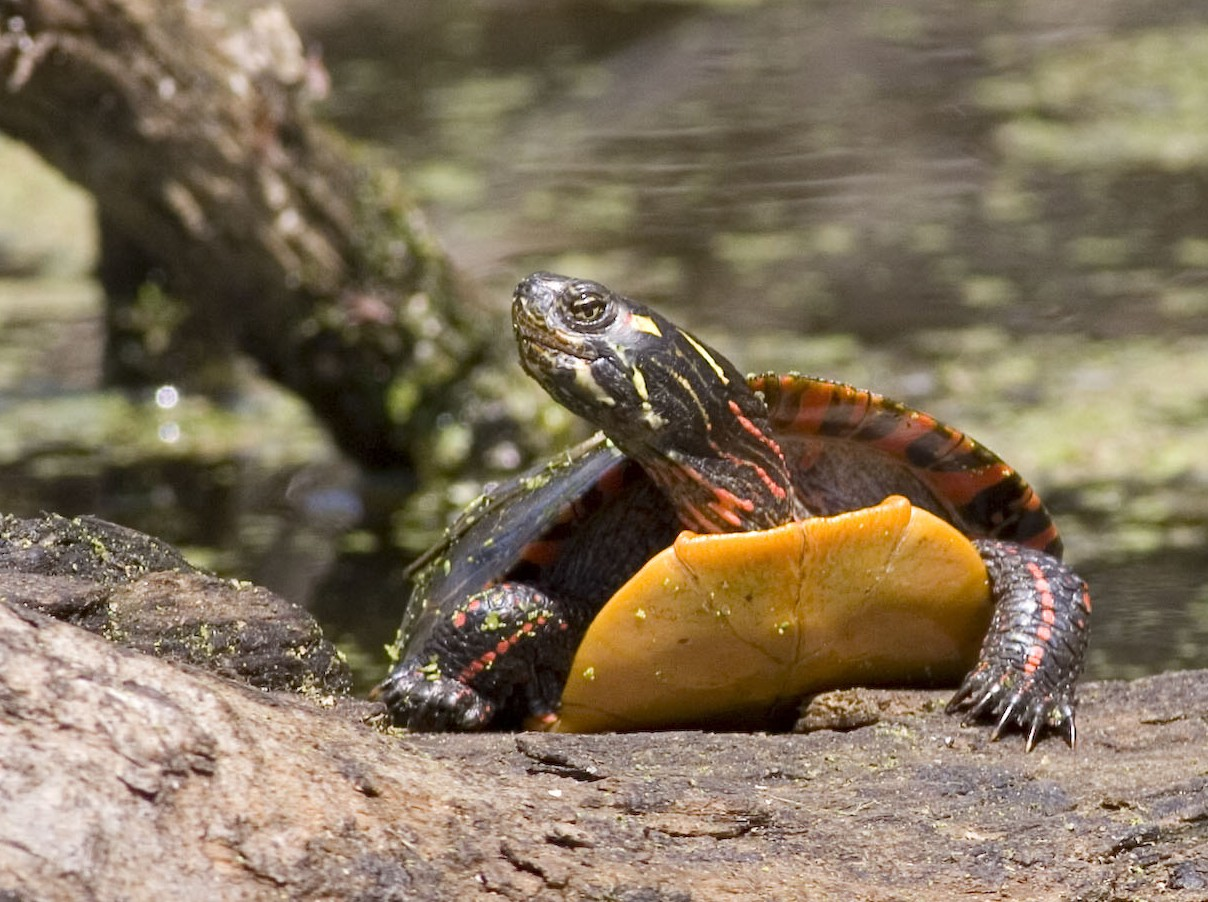
Western painted turtle

- Washington County, Colorado
- Washington County, Utah Territory
- Water parks in Colorado
- Waterfalls of Colorado
  - commons:Category:Waterfalls in Colorado
- Watersheds of Colorado website
- Weld County, Colorado
- Western Federation of Miners
- Western painted turtle - Colorado state reptile
- "Where the Columbines Grow" - Colorado state song
- Byron White
- Carl Wieman
  Wikimedia
  - Wikimedia Commons:Category:Colorado
    - commons:Category:Maps of Colorado
  - Wikinews:Category:Colorado
    - Wikinews:Portal:Colorado
  - Wikipedia Category:Colorado
    - Wikipedia Portal:Colorado
    - Wikipedia:WikiProject Colorado
      - Category:WikiProject Colorado articles
      - Category:WikiProject Colorado participants
- Wind power in Colorado
- Repopulation of wolves in Colorado
- World Heritage Sites in Colorado
  - Mesa Verde National Park

== X ==
- Xeriscaping

== Y ==
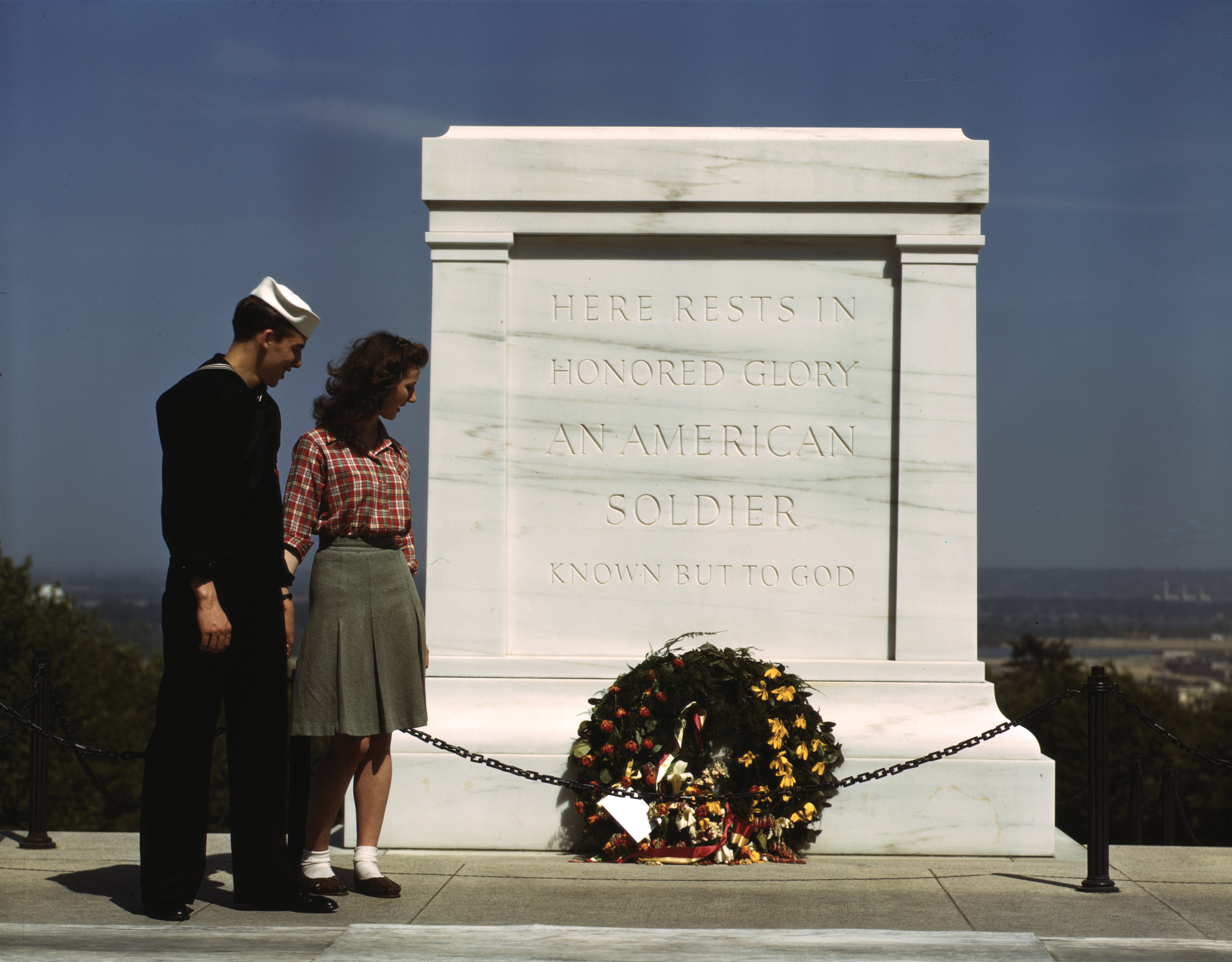
The Tomb of the Unknowns carved from Colorado Yule Marble

- Yule Marble - Colorado state rock
- Yuma County, Colorado

== Z ==
- Zoos in Colorado
  - commons:Category:Zoos in Colorado

== See also ==
- Bibliography of Colorado
- Geography of Colorado
- History of Colorado
- List of Colorado-related lists
- Outline of Colorado
