= Phantom Canyon =

Phantom Canyon may refer to:

- Phantom Canyon (Pikes Peak Area), a canyon in Colorado, United States
- Phantom Canyon (Fort Collins Area), a canyon in Colorado, United States
- Phantom Canyon, part of Phantom Manor, an attraction in Disneyland Paris, France
