= List of Colorado boards of cooperative educational services =

List of boards of cooperative educational services in the U.S. State of Colorado

Coordinates: 38.9972°N 105.5478°W

The location of the State of Colorado in the United States of America.

The following is a list of the 22 boards of cooperative educational services (BOCES) in the State of Colorado of the United States.

== Colorado BOCES ==
1. Adams County Board of Cooperative Services website
2. Centennial Board of Cooperative Educational Services website
3. East Central Board of Cooperative Educational Services website
4. Expeditionary Learning School Board of Cooperative Educational Services website
5. Front Range Board of Cooperative Educational Services website
6. Grand Valley Board of Cooperative Educational Services BOCES
7. Larimer Board of Cooperative Educational Services BOCES
8. Mount Evans Board of Cooperative Educational Services BOCES
9. Mountain Board of Cooperative Educational Services website
10. Northeast Board of Cooperative Educational Services website
11. Northwest Colorado Board of Cooperative Educational Services website
12. Pikes Peak Board of Cooperative Educational Services website
13. Rio Blanco Board of Cooperative Educational Services website
14. San Juan Board of Cooperative Services website
15. San Luis Valley Board of Cooperative Services website
16. Santa Fe Trail Board of Cooperative Educational Services BOCES
17. South Central Board of Cooperative Educational Services website
18. South Platte Valley Board of Cooperative Educational Services
19. Southeastern Board of Cooperative Educational Services website
20. Southwest Board of Cooperative Educational Services website
21. Uncompahgre Board of Cooperative Services website
22. Ute Pass Special Board of Cooperative Educational Services BOCES

== See also ==
- Board of cooperative educational services
- List of BOCES
- List of school districts in Colorado
- Bibliography of Colorado
- Geography of Colorado
- History of Colorado
- Index of Colorado-related articles
- List of Colorado-related lists
- Outline of Colorado
