= South Park (Saguache County, Colorado) =

South Park (38°04′27″N 106°24′42″W) is a geologic flat in Saguache County, Colorado near Houselog Creek and 1 mi (1.6 km) north of Mount Lion at Saguache County Road 33Aa.
