= Executive Recycling =

Executive Recycling is an Englewood, Colorado-based business specializing in electronic waste recycling. 60 Minutes linked Executive Recycling to the illegal export of electronic waste from the Denver area to Guiyu, China. In the report, the company also was found to have illegally offered to help an undercover investigative team to ship more than 1,500 CRT (cathode ray tube) monitors and 1,200 CRT TVs to Hong Kong for recycling purposes. The story added that the federal government issued a search warrant to investigate Executive Recycling's actions. Until November 2008, Executive Recycling was partnered with Colorado's Governor's Office of Economic Development to assist in recycling pickup events.

In response to the 60 Minutes report, Executive Recycling issued a statement claiming that they "... discovered that forged documents (provided by the port authorities) were used to improperly shift blame to us when ER (Executive Recycling) sold the tested working units to a Canadian wholesale buyer. We are currently seeking legal actions against this one wholesale buyer in regards to this report." When asked by the Denver Business Journal about how other Executive Recycling shipments had illegally made their way from Colorado to China, as 60 Minutes had reported, the company's CEO, Brandon Richter, did not answer the questions.

As of December 2012, both the CEO and vice president of Executive Recycling have been convicted "of multiple counts of mail and wire fraud and environmental crimes related to the illegal disposal of electronic waste, smuggling, and obstruction of justice, following an 11-day trial." The CEO was sentenced to thirty months in prison in December 2012, and the vice president received a sentence of 14 months in federal prison in July 2013. They were both ordered to pay tens of thousands of dollars in fines and restitution.
