= Colorado Media School =

Private college in Lakewood, Colorado, US

Coordinates: 39.709064°N 105.078091°W

The Colorado Media School is a private, for-profit college located in Lakewood, Colorado. It is an affiliate campus of the Ohio Center for Broadcasting. The Colorado Media School first opened in Colorado in 2001. It is currently located in the Belmair shopping district in Lakewood, Colorado. The college offers a certificate program that is designed to take 36 weeks to complete. The Tuition and Fees in 2015 cost $16,465 and 88% of program graduates took out loans.
