= Colorado Engineering Experiment Station, Inc. =

American corporation

Colorado Engineering Experiment Station, Inc. is an American corporation whose primary business is flow meter calibrations.

== History ==
Starting in 1951, the Engineering Experiment Station was a program run by the University of Colorado designed for small rocket research and development. The facility tested turbine meters for the Naval Ordnance Test Station located in China Lake, California. In 1966, Dr. Tom Arnberg of the Mechanical Engineering Department aided in moving the facility to Nunn, Colorado, to separate from the university. The new facility, which used to be an Atlas nuclear missile silo, was renamed the Colorado Engineering Experiment Station, Inc. (or "CEESI" for short) and operated as a nonprofit research and testing facility until 1986.

In 1986, Walt Seidl and Steve Caldwell purchased the organization and reopened it as a commercial test facility. CEESI expanded the Colorado facility with the addition of the Wet Gas Test Facility in 1998 and the Iowa Natural Gas Facility in 1999.

== Staff and accreditations ==
Rich Schoonover is the President of Corporate Operations.

CEESI engineers are members of flow measurement standards committees organized by the AGA (American Gas Association), API (American Petroleum Institute), and ASME (American Society of Mechanical Engineers).

The lab is accredited to ISO/IEC 17025 by the American Association for Laboratory Accreditation (A2LA).

== Flow meter testing ==
Flow meter testing includings turbine, vortex, differential-pressure, Coriolis, magnetic, positive-displacement, cone meter, ultrasonic and severalvalve types.

== Facilities ==
=== Iowa ===
CEESI's Iowa facility, in Clear Lake, is located on a custody transfer location owned by the Northern Border Pipeline Company. This facility flows 1-2 billion cubic feet of natural gas per day. The natural gas used for CEESI meter calibrations is diverted from the Northern Border pipeline, then repressurized and returned into the pipeline after calibrations are completed. The Iowa facility began offering commercial calibrations in April 1999. The first meter calibrated at the Iowa facility was a 12-inch Instromet ultrasonic meter in March 1999. All of the instruments involved in the scale-up were controlled by NIST (National Institute of Standards and Technology) staff and were calibrated using NIST's quality control processes. This scale-up calibration process is repeated regularly in accordance with NIST quality procedures. Flow meter calibration end users have the option to pay NIST to supervise calibrations; these calibrations qualify as NIST calibrations.

=== Wet Gas ===
In March 1997, several energy companies formed a Joint Industry Project (JIP) to collectively fund research on gas metering, specifically for wet gas. The project was funded by member companies and the Gas Research Institute for three years. In 1998, CEESI constructed the Wet Gas Test Facility to facilitate flow meter testing on wet or unprocessed natural gas.

== Conferences ==
The International Symposium on Fluid Flow Measurement (ISFFM) is a conference held every three to four years which focuses on fluid flow measurement. CEESI served as the secretariat for the ISFFM in 1999, 2002, 2006, 2009, 2012, 2015, and 2018.

== Measurement Library website ==
The "CEESI Technical Library", a website with documents and references to papers related to fluid flow measurement, was created in October 2007. It is based on agreements with the American School of Gas Measurement Training, American Gas Association, and the Natural Gas Sampling Technology Conference to allow for the downloading of papers on flow measurement topics. Agreements with the International School of Hydrocarbon Measurement (ISHM) resulted in ISHM publications being available on the website. Similarly, the organizers of the International Symposium on Fluid Flow Measurement (the North American Fluid Flow Measurement Council) granted permission to host symposium proceedings for downloading. A partnership with the Pipeline Research Council International (also known as "PRCI") in 2008 allowed the expansion and further development of the library; the library's name was changed to the “Flow Measurement Technical Library” after this partnership began. By 2012, the following organizations/conferences that have allowed some portion of their papers to be downloadable by the public through the Flow Measurement Technical Library: International School of Hydrocarbon Measurement, International Symposium on Fluid Flow Measurement, Acadiana Flow Measurement Society, American School of Gas Measurement Technologies, National Institute of Standards and Technology, Western Gas Measurement Short Course, Canadian School of Hydrocarbon Measurement, Flow Measurement Institute, South East Asia Hydrocarbon Flow Measurement Workshop, North Sea Flow Measurement Workshop, and the Appalachian Gas Measurement Short Course. In 2017, the name was shortened to "Measurement Library".
