= Agloves =

- Founded: 2010
- Founder: Jennifer Spencer
- Defunct: 2013
- Fate: Closed in 2013, patent rights acquired in 2014
- Headquarters: Boulder, Colorado

Agloves (pronounced “a-gloves”) was an American, privately held winter touchscreen glove company that made gloves which worked on all capacitive touchscreens. The company was based in Boulder, Colorado.

== History ==
Agloves were launched on September 29, 2010 by Jennifer and Jean Spencer. Jennifer Spencer, inventor of the gloves, served as the company’s CEO and President. The gloves incorporated silver-nylon yarn to conduct the body's bioelectricity to the touchscreen device.

As of May 10, 2013, Agloves closed their business for personal reasons.

In August 2014, AGloves' rights and patents were purchased by NY based Prolific Innovations LLC, which continued to bring the AGlove to the marketplace.

== Recognition ==
Agloves won several awards including Best New Product and Best New Company from 2011 Stevie Awards; and the Innovation Quotient Award from the Boulder County Business Report.
