= Phantom Canyon (Fort Collins Area) =

Coordinates: 40.842°N 105.294°W

Phantom Canyon is a canyon located in Colorado, in the Western United States. It is in the Laramie Foothills region of Colorado, near Fort Collins. It is formed by the North Fork of the Cache la Poudre River. It is one of the only canyons in the Colorado Front Range that is roadless.
