= Genesee Park (Colorado) =

- U.S. National Register of Historic Places
- U.S. Historic district
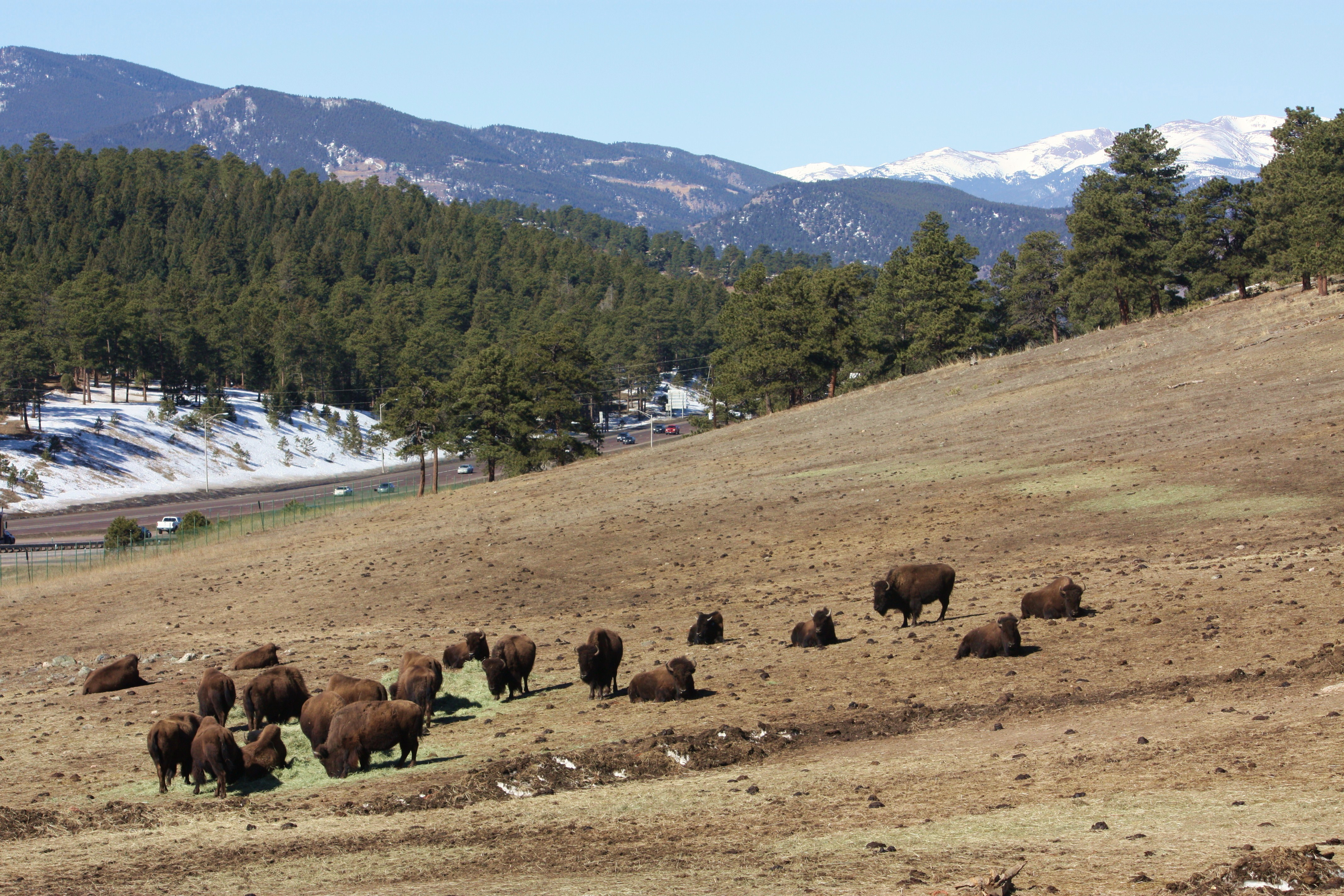
- Herd of American Bison at Genesee Park, I-70 in the distance

- Location within Colorado Location within the United States
- Nearest city: Golden, Colorado
- Coordinates: 39°42′53″N 105°18′44″W
- Built: 1913
- Architect: Olmsted Brothers; Jacques Benedict; Civilian Conservation Corps
- Architectural style: Rustic
- MPS: Denver Mountain Parks MPS
- NRHP reference No.: 90001710
- Added to NRHP: November 15, 1990

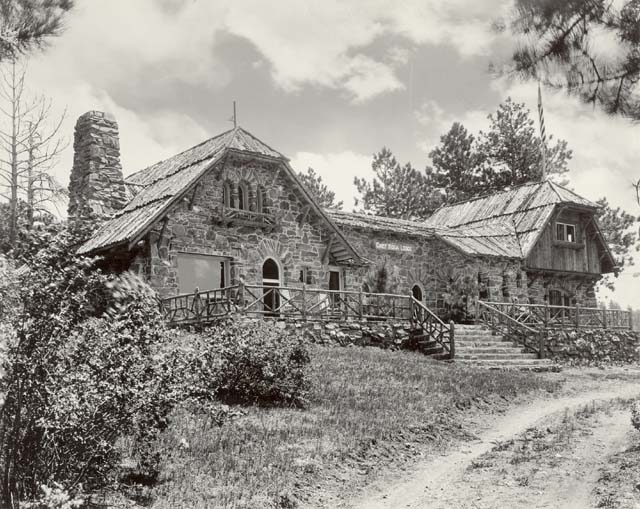
Chief Hosa Lodge, Genesee Mountain Park

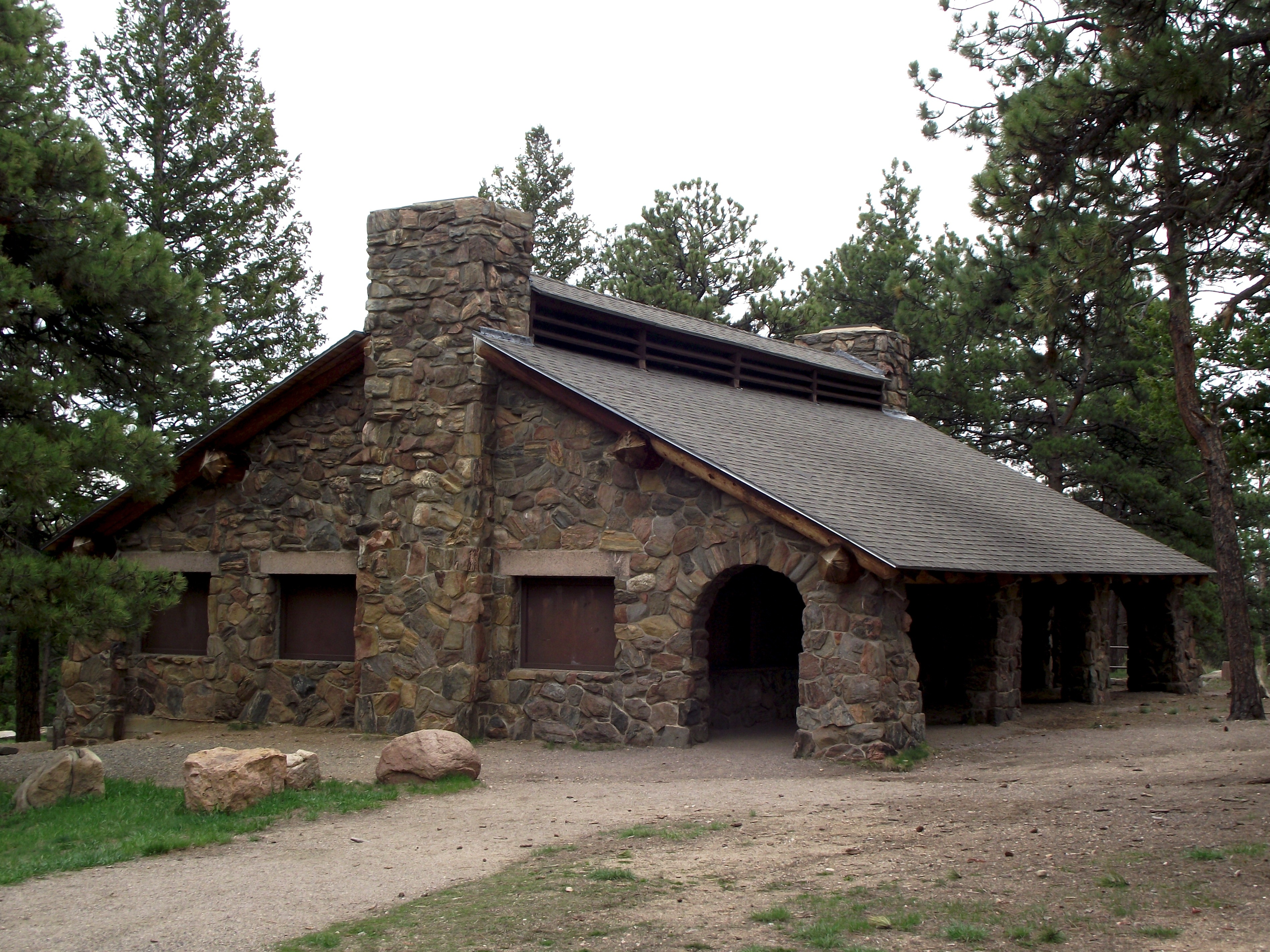
Picnic Shelter built by CCC in Genesee Park

Genesee Park is a park in Jefferson County, Colorado. It is the largest park in the Denver Mountain Parks system, with a total of 2,413 acres (9.77 km^{2}). The land for Genesee Park was initially purchased in 1912 and the park area was largely complete by 1926.

The park contains two mountains, Genesee Mountain at 8,284 feet (2,525 m) above sea level and Bald Mountain at 7,988 feet (2,435 m) above sea level. The park also contains forests of ponderosa pine, Douglas-fir, and lodgepole pine. Interstate 70 traverses the park between exits 252 and 254 along the Lariat Loop Scenic & Historic Byway. On I-70 just west of exit 254, there are scenic overlooks for both directions for viewing the historic Bison herd, which live on maintained pastures on the north and south sides of I-70. The park's bison herd is owned by the City and County of Denver. Some of the original bison were acquired from Yellowstone National Park by the Denver Zoo and the City of Denver as early leaders in the conservation of bison. The bison herd moved here in 1914 and was expanded to Daniels Park in 1938. Thirty five bison were distributed to Native American tribes in 2023.

Chief Hosa Lodge, designed by Jacques Benedict, was built in 1918. A historical point of interest near Exit 253, it is used as an event facility. The nearby Chief Hosa Campground serves recreational travelers each year between May and September. A large stone picnic shelter near Genesee Mountain was built by the Civilian Conservation Corps in 1939. There is a "Braille trail" area with signs and guide ropes.

Snow ski jumping competitions were held 1921–1927 with thousands of spectators.

== See also ==
- National Register of Historic Places listings in Jefferson County, Colorado
