= Florence Martin =

Australian-American physicist and philanthropist (1867-1957)

- Born: 25 December 1867; Clarens, Potts Point, Sydney, Australia
- Died: 27 October 1957 (aged 89); Denver, Colorado, United States
- Education: University of Sydney; Cavendish Laboratory
- Parents: Sir James Martin (father); Isabella Long (mother)
- Relatives: William Long (uncle); Eleanor Manning (niece)

Florence Martin (25 December 1867 – 27 October 1957) was an Australian-American physicist and philanthropist. She performed research at the University of Sydney under Sir Richard Threlfall and at Cavendish Laboratory under J. J. Thomson. Her donations of land in Douglas County, Colorado, led to the creation of Daniels Park, a Denver Mountain Park.

== Early life and education ==
Martin was born on 25 December 1867 to Sir James Martin, Premier of New South Wales, and his wife Isabella Long, the daughter of a convict turned successful businessman. The eleventh of fifteen children, she was educated by a governess and later at Madame Gilder's school, Campbell Lodge. Her father died in 1886, and in 1891, she enrolled at the University of Sydney in arts. She completed her first year with honours in physics and enrolled again in 1892.

== Research ==
In 1892 Martin took on the role of an unpaid research assistant to Professor Sir Richard Threlfall, a family friend. She worked with him from 1892 to 1893, during which time they produced a paper, "On an Approximate Method of finding the Forces acting in Magnetic Circuits", which was published first in the Journal and Proceedings of the Royal Society of New South Wales, and then in the Philosophical Magazine. After this was published, Martin went to England with a recommendation from Threlfall to J. J. Thomson.

Only the second Australian research student to work at the Cavendish, she took advanced undergraduate practical classes and performed research under the direction of Thomson for about eighteen months. During this time she published a paper on gas expansion in capacitors in the Proceedings of the Cambridge Philosophical Society (in which she is called "Miss Martin"). Though Martin was the sole author on the paper, Thomson orally presented the paper to the Cambridge Philosophical Society on her behalf.

Martin moved back to Sydney in 1896 and began collaborating with Threlfall again. They published two more papers, "A Contribution to the Study of Oxygen at Low Pressures" and "Magnetic Hysteresis Losses in Feebly Magnetic and in Diamagnetic Substances".

In 1899 she became housekeeper for her senile mother, marking the end of her physics career.

== Philanthropy ==
In 1905, Martin met William Cooke Daniels, an American explorer, veteran of the Spanish–American War, and millionaire department store owner. Daniels' fiancée, Cicely Banner, lived with Martin for sixteen months while Daniels was on an expedition to Papua New Guinea. After Daniels married Banner in 1907, Martin began living with them (primarily in England and France) and travelling the world with them.

The Daniels couple both died in 1918, and Florence Martin inherited most of their estate and settled around Denver. She donated 38 acres in 1920 and another 962 in 1937 to establish Daniels Park in Douglas County, Colorado.

In 1934, Martin endowed the Denver Art Museum's Cooke-Daniels Memorial Lectures.

== See also ==
- Tweet Kimball, rancher and art collector whose donation preserved Cherokee Ranch adjacent to Daniels Park
