= Tweet Kimball =

American rancher and art collector (1914–1999)

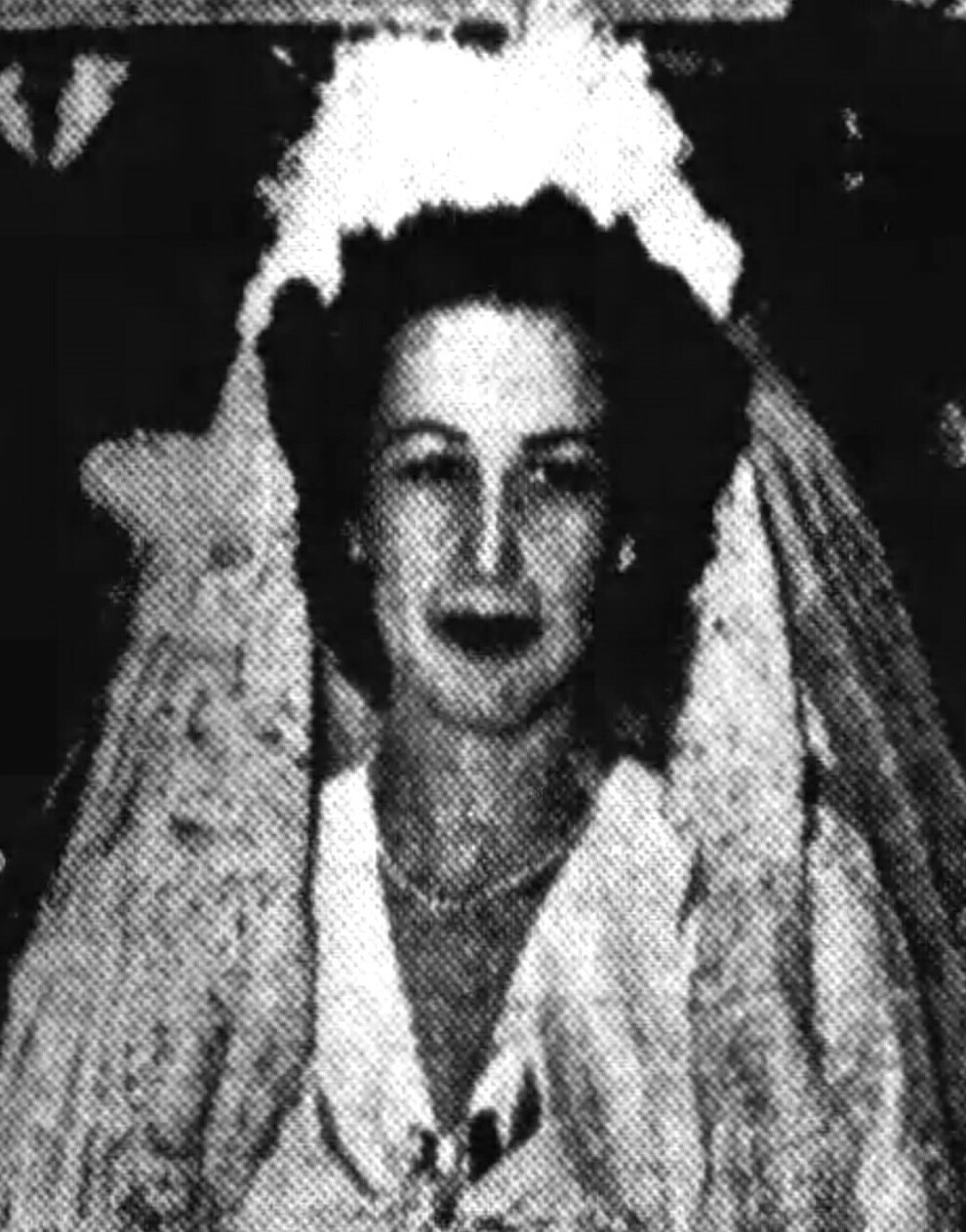
Kimball in 1938

Mildred Montague Genevieve "Tweet" Kimball (14 June 1914–16 January 1999), was an American rancher, art collector, and heiress who owned and lived on the 3,400-acre (1,376 ha) Cherokee Ranch and its associated castle north of Sedalia in Douglas County, Colorado, from 1954 until her death. Born to a wealthy Tennessee family and raised in Chattanooga, Kimball moved to Colorado following her divorce from diplomat husband Merritt Ruddock.

During her time at Cherokee Ranch, Kimball promoted and bred Santa Gertrudis cattle in a colder environment than ever previously done. Her lobbying saw the National Western Stock Show introduce the exhibition and sale of Santa Gertrudis; Kimball eventually became the first female member of the National Western Stock Show Association. Kimball also accumulated a preserved collection which includes 14 original architectural drawings by Christopher Wren, a Queen Anne desk, and two first-edition sets of Winston Churchill's works. Kimball established a foundation prior to her death, preserving her collections, the castle, and ranch land–the latter of which includes portions of the Cherokee Ranch petrified forest and forms part of a larger 12,000-acre open space with the Highlands Ranch Backcountry Wilderness and Daniels Park.

== Life ==
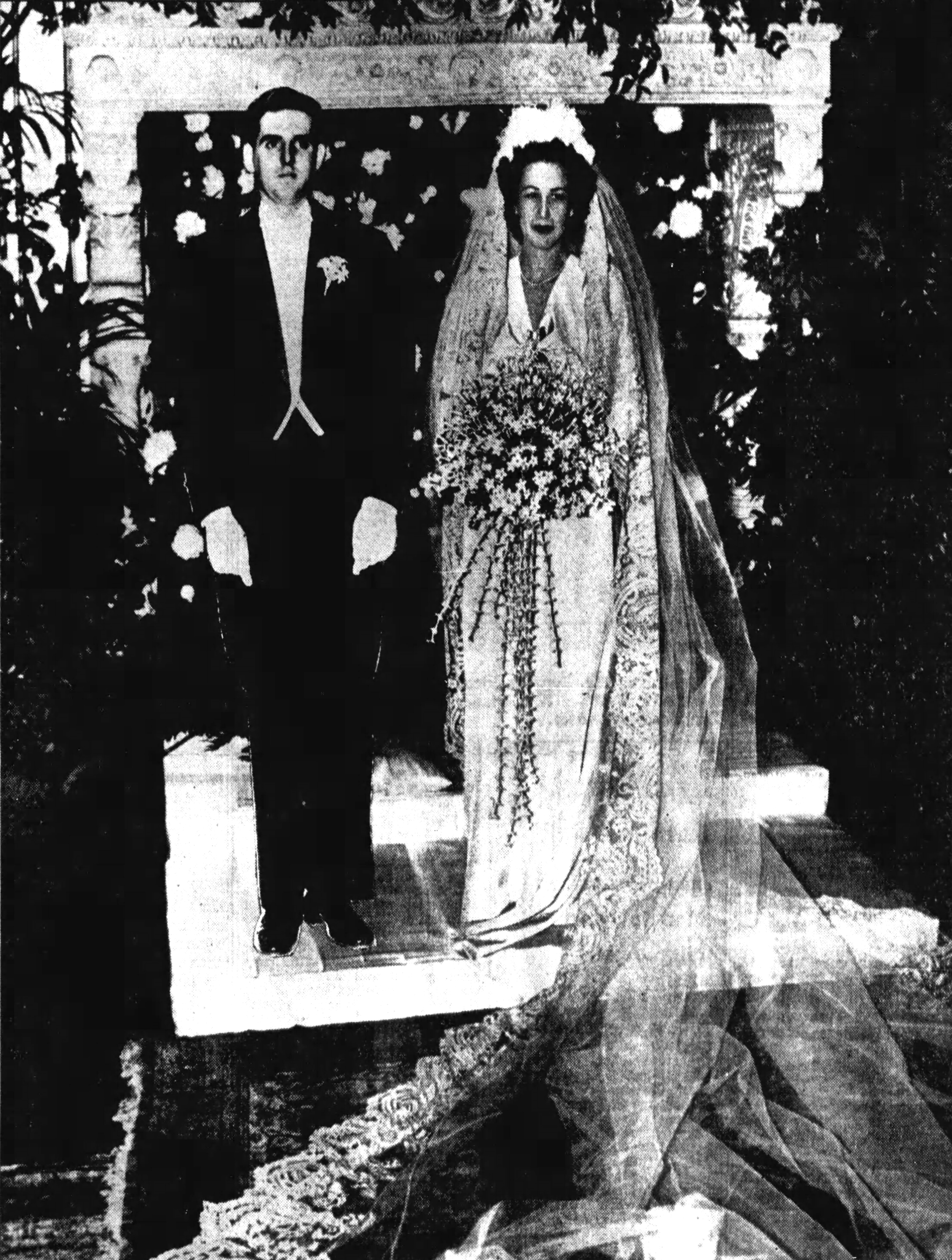
Mr. and Mrs. Merritt Kirk Ruddock, at their wedding in 1938

Mildred Montague Genevieve Kimball was born on June 14, 1914. Nicknamed "Tweet" by her father Richard Huntington Kimball, a West Point graduate, she was raised as a belle in Chattanooga, Tennessee. Kimball would attend Bryn Mawr College and marry diplomat and OSS operative Merritt Ruddock, with whom she would adopt two sons: Kirk and Richard. After World War II, Merritt was stationed at the American embassy in London, leading Tweet to develop relationships with monarchs and other political figures.

Tweet and Merritt's marriage did not survive their return to the United States. According to Micki Clark, a CEO of the Cherokee Castle & Ranch Foundation, "[Merritt] said there wasn't room on the same side of the Mississippi for both of them". Merritt purchased Charlford Castle, a property near Sedalia in Douglas County, Colorado, in 1954 for Tweet. Charlford Castle had been constructed by the businessman Charles Alfred Johnson, who had hired architect Burnham Hoyt to style the structure on Scottish castles. The castle was constructed from 1924 to 1926. Johnson moved from the property in 1949. After purchasing it from Johnson, Tweet named the land Cherokee Ranch and renamed the castle as Cherokee Castle after the Cherokee people of Tennessee. The neighboring Blunt property was also purchased around the same time, bringing the land to a total of 3,400 acres. Tweet and Merritt divorced in September 1956, after which Tweet resumed using her maiden name. Kimball raised the couple's two sons at Cherokee Castle. She would marry three more times, including to intelligence officer Glenn Walker of Denver.

While the castle's land had not been used as a ranch, Kimball decided to raise Santa Gertrudis cattle at Cherokee Ranch. This operation began in 1954 with 38 cows and one bull from Texas. Santa Gertrudis, a cross between Brahman and Shorthorn, had previously not been raised in a climate as cold as that of Cherokee Ranch, but Kimball later said, "I knew because of their Shorthorn blood that the Santas could take the cold". Kimball was correct and the herd did well. She established the Rocky Mountain Santa Gertrudis Association in 1961 and, in 1966, successfully lobbied the National Western Stock Show into exhibiting and selling Santa Gertrudis; she would later become the National Western Stock Show Association's first female member. The stock show's 1980–81 grand champion was Kimball's bull Cherokee Little Governor, which is buried with a headstone on Cherokee Ranch.

Under Kimball's ownership, Cherokee Castle became host to her extensive collections of art, furniture, and books. Among her collection are 14 architectural drawings by Christopher Wren, paintings by Thomas Gainsborough and Peter Paul Rubens, and a Queen Anne desk. She also accumulated a 14,000-volume library containing many 17th- and 18th-century books and two first-edition sets of Winston Churchill's writings. Kimball also amassed collections of porcelain, china, and glasswork.

Kimball successfully got Cherokee Ranch and Castle on the National Register of Historic Places in 1994. Working with Douglas County and the Douglas County Open Lands Coalition, she ensured the property would never be further developed through a conservation easement in 1996. That same year, she established the Cherokee Castle & Ranch Foundation to enabled the preservation of her land, collections, and cattle. When she died in 1999, Cherokee Ranch became part of a 12,000-acre complex of open space with Highlands Ranch Backcountry Wilderness and Daniels Park. Her actions also preserved the Cherokee Ranch petrified forest, which has remained relatively untouched by human predation in part due to the property's private ownership. Elk, mule deer, turkey, bears, cattle, bats, mountain lions, and many other animals all currently roam Cherokee Ranch.

== See also ==
- Florence Martin, Australian-American philanthropist whose donation created Daniels Park
