= Daniels Park =

Denver Mountain Park in Colorado

- U.S. National Register of Historic Places
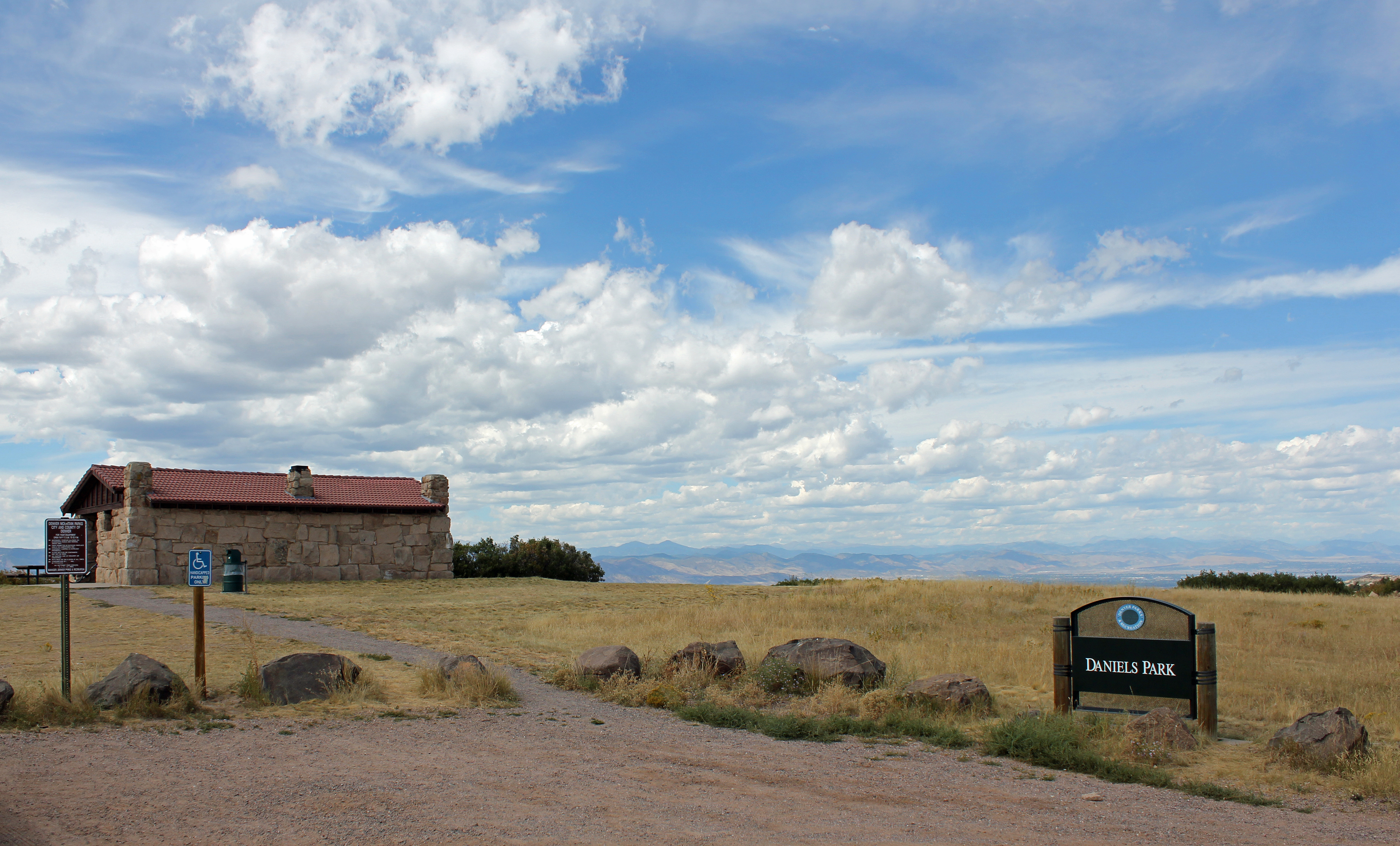

- Location within Colorado
- Nearest city: Sedalia, Colorado
- Coordinates: 39°29′06″N 104°55′39″W
- Area: 963 acres (3.90 km^{2})
- Built: 1920
- Architect: Jules Jacques Benoit Benedict
- Architectural style: Rustic
- MPS: Denver Mountain Parks MPS
- NRHP reference No.: 95000795
- Added to NRHP: June 30, 1995

Daniels Park is a former working ranch in Douglas County, Colorado, United States. The park is one of the Denver Mountain Parks and was listed on the National Register of Historic Places in 1995. It is located along Douglas County Road 67 northeast of Sedalia and west of Castle Pines. The modern-day park may have been the site of Kit Carson's last campfire and includes a memorial to the frontiersman.

Florence Martin, an Australian-American philanthropist, made two donations of her ranch's 1,000 acres (400 ha) to establish Daniels Park. The park includes some structures dating from 1920, and work by architect Jules Jacques Benoit Benedict. Prominent locations include Florence Martin Ranch, Riley Hill, and Wildcat Point. A herd of bison lives in the park, and the bison graze on the prairie grass in the park's upper elevations. Because of the presence of the bison, most of the park is not open to the public.

== History ==
The clear views afforded by the prominences on Riley Hill ridge and Wildcat Point led the area that would become Daniels Park to become popular as a stop for travelers in the 19th century. The Daniels Park Road originated as a trail constructed on the ridge in the late 1850s or early 1860s, making it one of the first of Colorado's territorial roads. In 1868, noted frontiersman Kit Carson supposedly made his last campfire on Wildcat Point while traveling from Denver over Riley Hill before dying at Fort Lyon. The modern park now includes a memorial to Carson, placed by the Territorial Daughters in 1923. In the 1860s, newspaper reporter Fitz Hugh Ludlow attested to a petrified forest—now recognized as the Cherokee Ranch petrified forest—in the modern-day Daniels Park area.

Florence Martin, an Australian-American philanthropist, made two donations of her ranch's land totaling around 1,000 acres (400 ha) that became Daniels Park. William Cooke Daniels–a major and owner of the Daniels & Fisher department store in Denver–and his wife, Cicely Banner Daniels, both died in 1918. The store's ownership passed to store president Charles MacAllister Willcox and Martin (a friend of Cicely). Martin purchased the property that became Daniels Park in 1919 as a summer home for herself and her sister, Emily. The next year, Florence donated 38 acres to the Denver Mountain Parks system contingent on them naming it for the late Daniels; the area was renamed to Daniels Park after previously being known as Wild Cat Mountain and Auto View.

In 1922, Jules Jacques Benoit Benedict designed a picnic shelter for the new park. The city also constructed several campfire sites. The park's views of the Front Range from Pikes Peak to Longs Peak meant the small area became a popular picnic site. On the land retained by Martin, a house and ranch facilities were constructed through the early 1920s. Martin's house burned in 1937, spurring her to donate 962 acres of the ranch to Denver Mountain Parks system. Park maintenance employees and their equipment moved into the surviving ranch facilities.

At another Denver Mountain Park, Genesee Park, a herd of bison was growing too large for the area. This bison herd had been sourced from Yellowstone National Park as part of earlier efforts to preserve the endangered species. Twenty bison were taken from the Genesee herd and relocated to Daniels Park in 1938, with around 800 acres of the park allocated to the herd. Both the Genesee and Daniels Park herds have become sources of bison for Native Americans, including to the Cheyenne and Arapaho Tribes in Oklahoma. While the bison had been previously auctioned, Denver began donating yearlings to selected tribes in 2022.

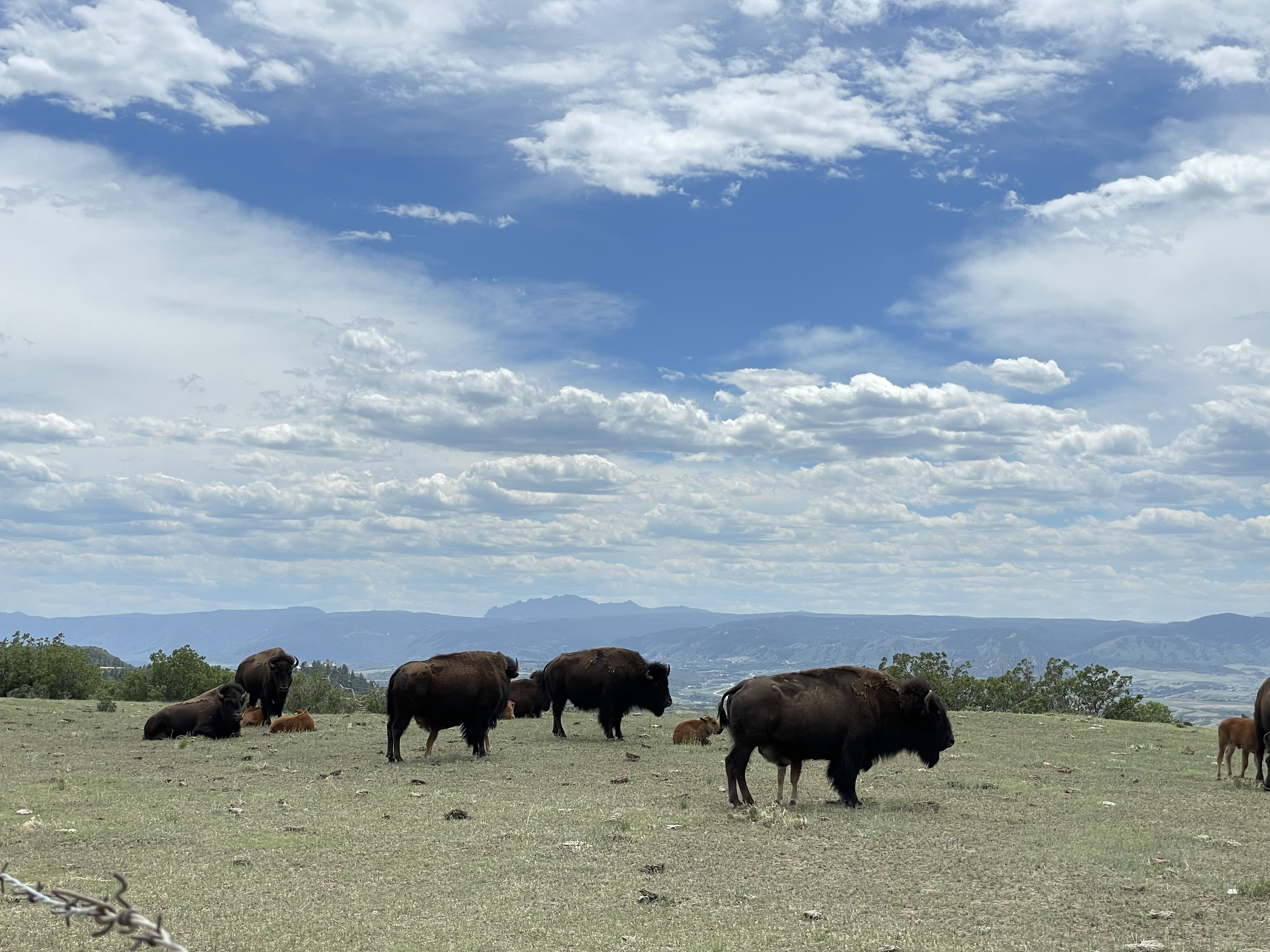
Bison in Daniels Park, 2022

Richard Tall Bull, a Cheyenne, pressed Denver to procure a space where the city's Native American community could have exclusive access to permit ceremonies and celebrations. He chose a 70-acre area of northern Daniels Park, which Denver set aside for exclusive Native American use in 1977; this grant was extended for 25 years in 1997. Management of the Tall Bull Memorial Grounds is coordinated by the intertribal Tall Bull Memorial Council, which hosts an annual pow wow on Labor Day Weekend.

From the late 1990s onward, Denver and Douglas County coordinated on improving the park's accessibility due to the recent nearby residential developments. The Martin Ranch barn's exterior was restored in 2006, followed a master plan for improving the park being shared in 2007. In 2008, Denver and Douglas County entered a cooperative agreement focused on restoring the park. Another improvement program that included paved roads, new trails, and additional parking and overlook locations was announced in 2017. The improvements, to cost $2 million, were funded by both the Denver and Douglas County governments. Earlier in the year, a crime wave was reported in the park, including substantial amounts of graffiti, litter, open campfires. The damage to the park proved expensive, leading the Denver Mountain Park Rangers and Douglas County Sheriff to introducing additional fences and patrols in the park; teenagers were suspected in the damage. The park is under the city's ownership, while Daniels Park Road is owned by Douglas County.

In June 2022, Douglas County's commissioners issued a proposal to take over Daniels Park in retaliation against Denver following a May vote by Denver city council to prohibit carrying concealed weapons in city parks. The effort was led by Douglas County commissioner George Teal and opposed by fellow commissioner Lora Thomas. The payment required to acquire the park was estimated by a Denver government official at around $800 million. Michael Hancock, the then-mayor of Denver, announced he had "no interest" in Daniels Park coming under Douglas County's ownership and said the proposals would not deter the city from pursuing the prohibition of concealed firearms in its parks.

== Description ==
The roughly 1000 acre park included four clusters of structures, including a total of 10 contributing buildings, nine contributing structures, and three contributing sites in its 1994 National Register of Historic Places registration. Among the structures is a picnic shelter designed by architect Jules Jacques Benoit Benedict. The surviving Florence Martin Ranch as an example of early 20th-century Colorado ranching and displays craftsmen elements typical of contemporary rural architecture.

The prominent Riley Hill ridge bisects the park and reaches the 6,600-foot elevation Wildcat Point. The landscape of the park includes varied topography, including pastureland, rocky outcroppings, and a sandstone mesa. It is the Denver Mountain Parks system's sole prairie park. Much of the park is inaccessible to the public due to the presence of a herd of bison. Elk also roam the park's grounds.

Daniels Park is east of the community of Castle Pines, though the developments do not impair the park's westward views. Highlands Ranch borders the park to the north. U.S. Route 85 runs to the south and west. The park is adjacent to the Highlands Ranch Backcountry Wilderness and privately held preserved Cherokee Ranch, creating a combined 12,000-acre open space that runs from Sedalia to Highlands Ranch. The area includes a 55 million-year-old petrified forest.

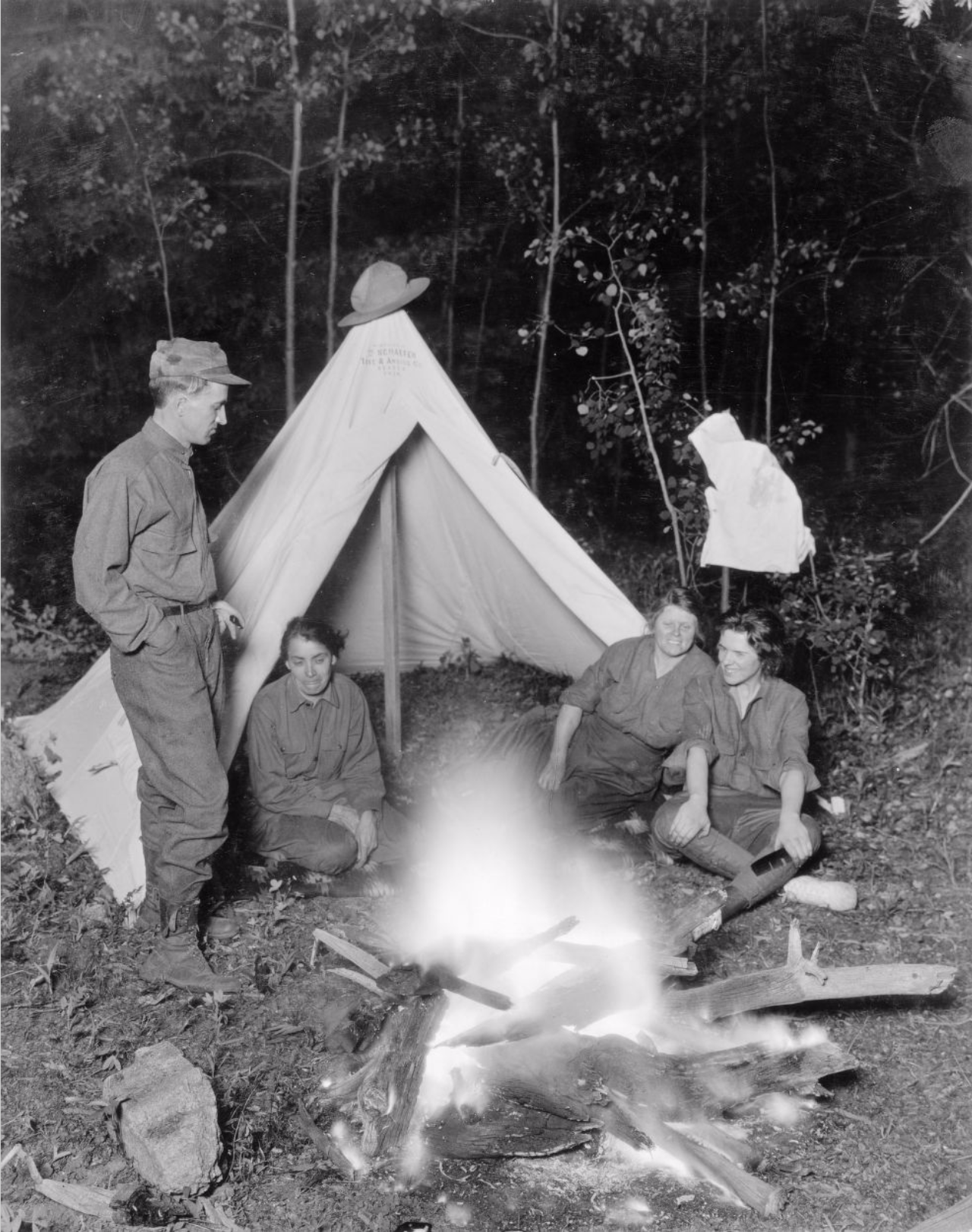
A campfire at Daniels Park, August 1920

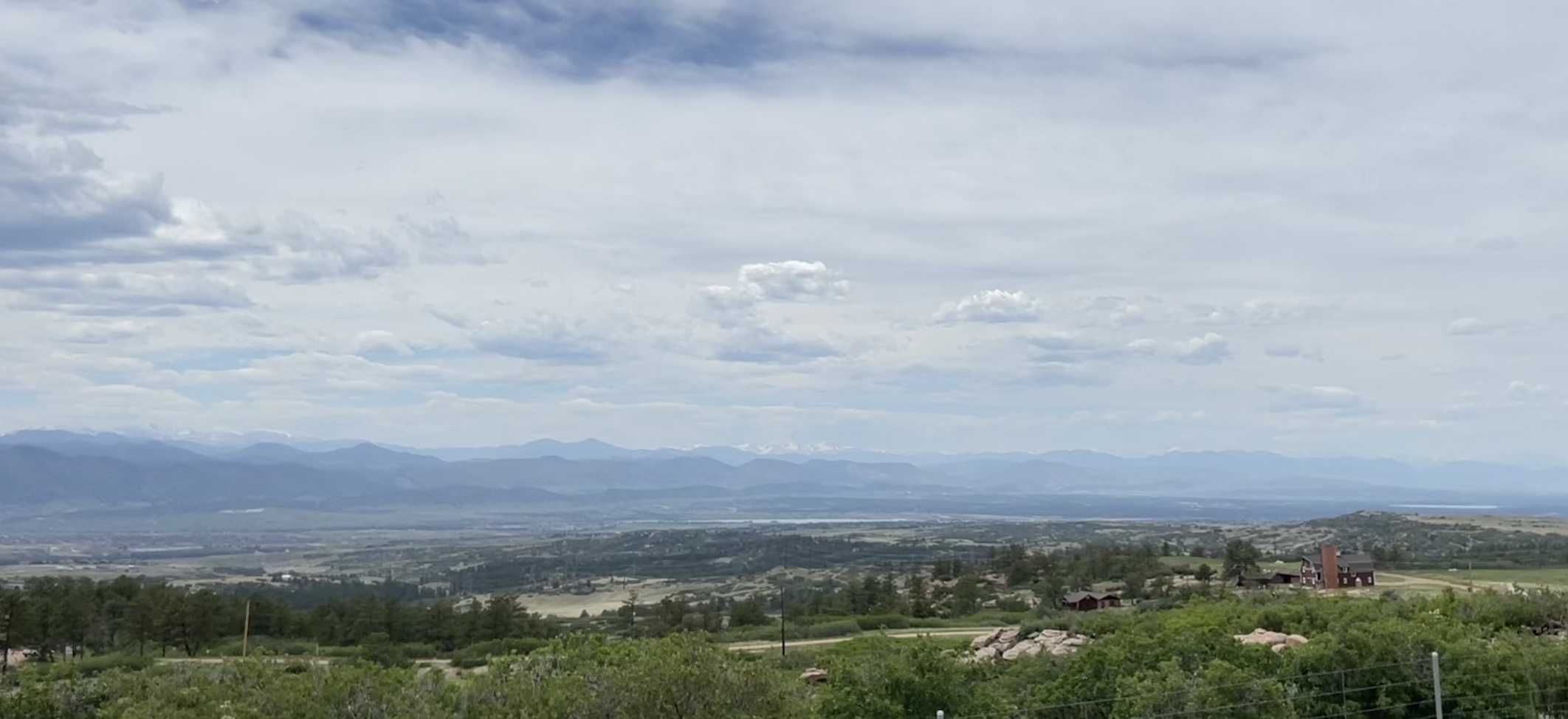
Daniels Park barn and silo looking north

== See also ==
- Daniels & Fisher Tower, a tower built adjacent to the Denver store the Daniels owned
