= Eleanor Manning =

Australian military officer and Girl Guide leader

Eleanor Manning OBE
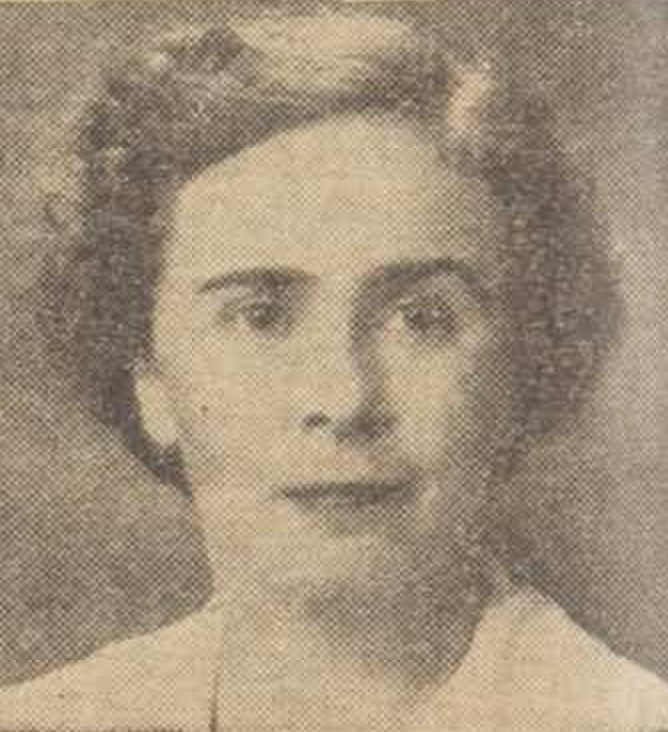
- Eleanor Manning in 1946
- Born: 21 March 1906; Point Piper, Sydney, New South Wales, Australia
- Died: 21 November 1986 (aged 80); Darlinghurst, Sydney, New South Wales, Australia
- Resting place: Northern Suburbs cemetery
- Education: Frensham School
- Occupations: Servicewoman and Girl Guide
- Father: Sir Henry Edward Manning
- Relatives: Florence Martin (aunt)
- Awards: Beaver (1938); Silver Fish (1954); OBE (1959); King George VI Coronation Medal; Queen Elizabeth II Coronation Medal

Eleanor Manning OBE (21 March 1906 – 21 November 1986) was a member of the Women's Australian National Services and became the most senior officer of the Australian Women's Army Service (AWAS) in the State of New South Wales. Manning was active in Girl Guiding both in Australia and internationally.

== Life ==
Born in 1906, Manning was the daughter of Sir Henry and Lady Manning. She was a pupil at Frensham School in Mittagong, New South Wales.

When the Australian Women's Army Service was established in October 1941, Manning was appointed Assistant Controller, Eastern Command with the rank of Major. After attending the first Officers Training School held at Yarra Junction, Victoria in November 1941, she returned to Sydney and commenced duty at Headquarters Victoria Barracks, Sydney. She and her staff were responsible for the recruitment and initial training of all AWAS enlistments in New South Wales. In 1943, Manning became Deputy Controller to the Controller, Colonel Sybil Irving MBE of the AWAS, at their Headquarters in Melbourne.

Manning also served as Commanding Officer at the Australian Women's Services Officers' School, Darley, Victoria. This post combined the training of both the AWAS and the Australian Army Medical Women Service Officers.

In 1946, Manning and three other Girl Guides went to Malaya to serve with the Guide International Service (GIS) to work on post war rehabilitation. In 1955, she became Chief Commissioner of the Girl Guides Association of Australia (1955–1962) and later a member of the World Committee of World Association of Girl Guides and Girl Scouts (1960–1969). Manning became Australian International Commissioner and was a driving force in the establishment of Sangam.

Manning was awarded the Beaver (1938), Silver Fish (1954), O.B.E. (1959) for services as Chief Commissioner of the Girl Guides Association of Australia, King George VI Coronation Medal and the Queen Elizabeth II Coronation Medal.

== Eleanor Manning Training Fund ==
The Eleanor Manning Training Fund provides financial assistance to Australian Girl Guide trainers attending selected training events in the Asia-Pacific Region of WAGGGS. This reflects Manning's concern with the development of Guiding in this region.
