= Cherokee Ranch petrified forest =

Paleocene forest in Colorado, United States

Coordinates: 39°28′50″N 104°55′37″W

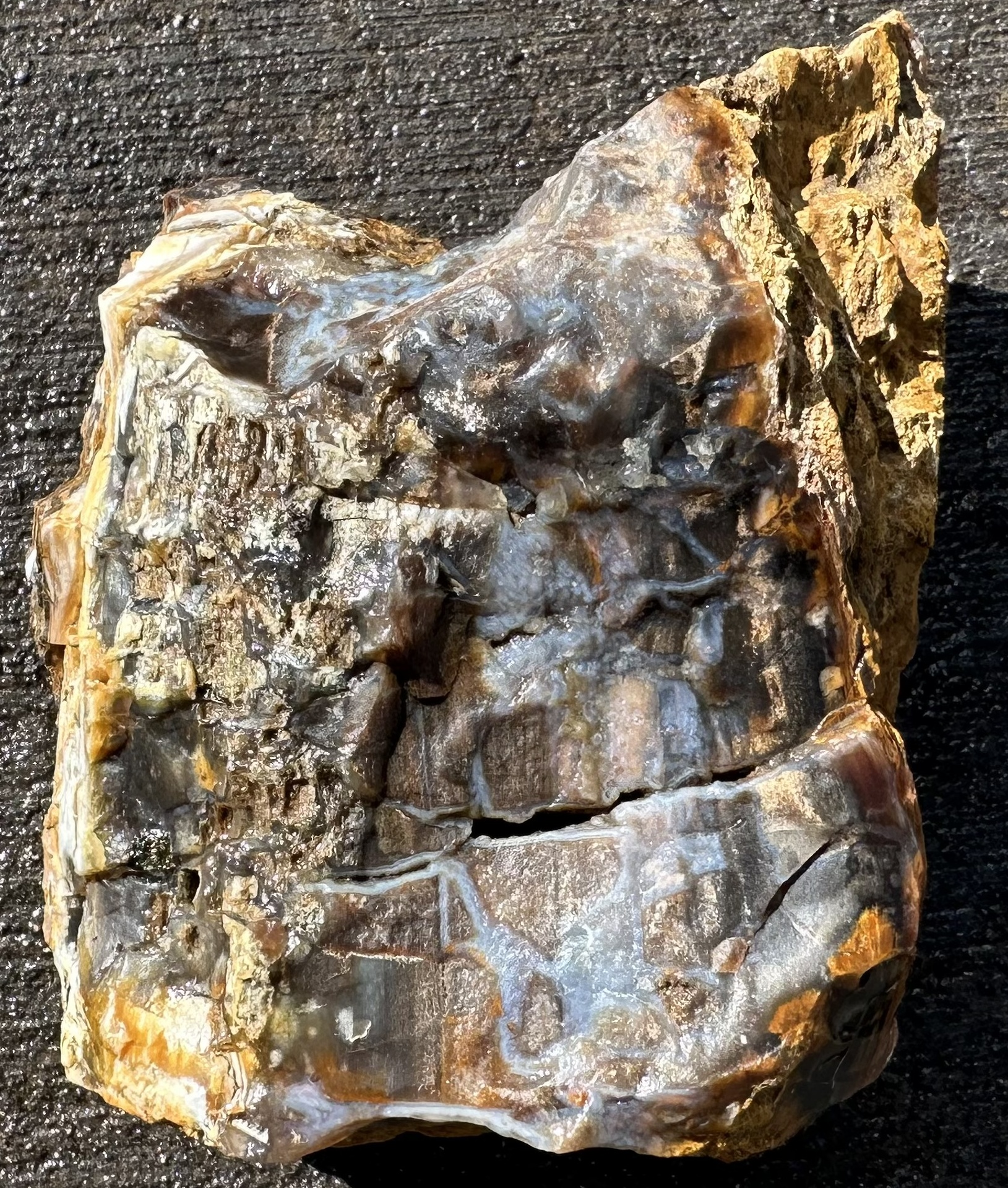
A fossil from the Cherokee Ranch petrified forest

A large petrified forest thought to date to the Paleocene at around 55 million years old is located on and around the grounds of Cherokee Ranch in Douglas County, Colorado. These Denver Basin fossils include plants similar to the modern laurel tree family. At least 40 large petrified logs have been discovered on the Cherokee Ranch property; the castle on the ranch site includes more than 4,000 pieces of petrified wood in its construction.

== Discovery ==
Newspaper reporter Fitz Hugh Ludlow attested to a petrified forest in the Daniels Park area in the 1860s. Later, the 1920s-built castle on modern-day Cherokee Ranch would incorporate over 4,000 pieces of petrified wood into its construction, alongside locally sourced rhyolite. However, the significant number of large petrified logs were not identified in the area until some years later.

Prior to her 1999 death, Tweet Kimball had arranged for her property at Cherokee Ranch to be preserved, including the petrified forest. Kimball's grave is marked by a large piece of petrified wood taken from Cherokee Mountain on the property. From 2005 onward, large quantities of petrified wood were identified. Peter Brown and John McKinney of the Cherokee Ranch Nature Camp met retired geologist Allan Koch in 2010 and Tom Machalski–an expert in Denver Basin petrified wood deposits–became involved in the investigation into petrified forest. A more extensive search in 2010 yielded large numbers of horizontally lying petrified logs belonging to a forest that had not yet been discussed by scientific literature, with at least 30 large and undisturbed logs found by 2015.

== Composition ==
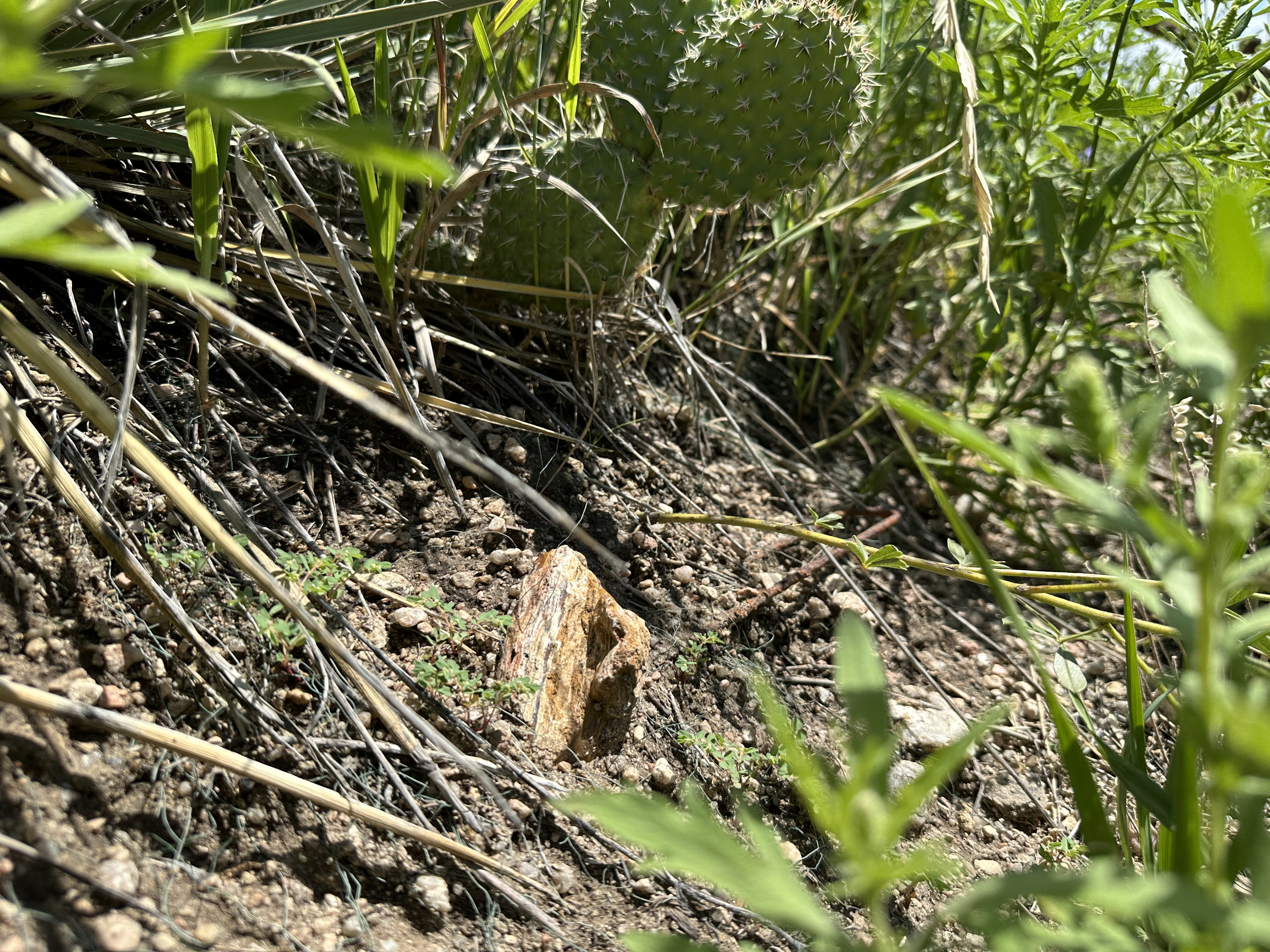
A piece of petrified wood in situ, Highlands Ranch, Colorado

The Denver Basin contains relatively few late Paleocene-age strata–with many dating to older periods–but laser ablation sampling in 2015 compared with a core sample from Castle Pines 2.5 kilometres (1.6 mi) away has been interpreted as indicating this more recent date. Zircons from sandstone samples adjacent to the petrified wood–found 2 metres (6.6 ft) below the Denver Basin's paleosol's base–was dated to as recent as 56 million years ago, with that serving as a possible oldest date for petrified wood's period of deposit. This placement of the Cherokee Ranch in the P6 (latest) Paleocene window is not conclusive due to a lack of sampling.

The large logs and other pieces in the Cherokee Ranch forest originated as river-driven driftwood, indicated by their location in a matrix of arkosic sandstone and the lack of both limbs and bark. No vertically oriented logs were found among the around 40 logs discovered up to 2019. The features of these plants are typical to Northern Hemisphere petrified woods dating to the late Cretaceous too late Eocene. Due to the terrain and private ownership of Cherokee Ranch, relatively few of the forest's fossils have been taken by people.

As of 2019, all analyzed samples from the Cherokee Ranch forest were dicotyledonous angiosperms. Growth rings are relatively uncommon in Cherokee Ranch samples, indicating that water stress and seasonality did not generally influence the forest. Many anatomical features have been preserved. Cellar structure analysis suggests some logs are the fossils of a now-extinct species likely related to the modern laurel tree family.

== See also ==
- Castlewood Canyon State Park, a nearby preserved area in Douglas County
- Florissant Formation, site of another Colorado petrified forest
