= Jacques Benedict =

American architect

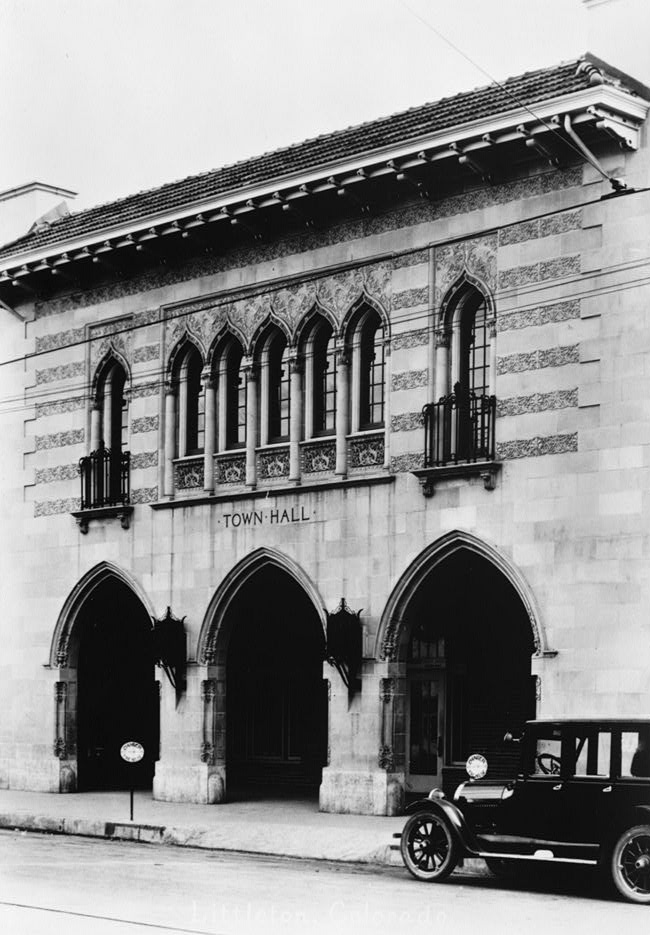
- Littleton Town Hall, built 1920
- Born: Jules Jacques Benois Benedict; April 22, 1879; Chicago, Illinois
- Died: January 16, 1948 (aged 68); Denver, Colorado
- Occupation: Architect

Jules Jacques Benois Benedict (April 22, 1879 – January 16, 1948) was one of the most prominent architects in Colorado history, whose works include a number of well-known landmarks and buildings listed on the National Register of Historic Places.

== Biography ==
Commonly known as Jacques Benedict, he was born in Chicago in 1879, and he studied architecture at the École des Beaux-Arts. He came to Denver in 1909, and became renowned for his many prominent works including homes, churches, academic and public buildings, spanning a range of architectural styles and with a particular gift for melding with natural landscapes. Benedict married June Louise Brown in Denver on February 20, 1912, and was hired to be the architect of the Catholic Archdiocese of Denver, becoming a respected authority on sacred architecture. The architect has been described by his biographer Doris Hulse, as "talented, cultured, eccentric, flamboyant, practical, difficult, opinionated, generous, temperamental, considerate, gentleman farmer, man-about-town", and a number of his works are widely known today.

Benedict died in January 1948 in a Denver hospital.

== Works ==
=== Denver ===
- 1901, Park Hill Elementary School, 5050 E. 19th Ave.
- 1910, McDonough House, 3939 W. 46th Ave
- 1910, Mayer House, 4101 Mountview Blvd., National Register of Historic Places
- 1910, Turner-Schuyler House, 300 E. 8th Ave. (demolished)
- 1911, Central Savings Bank, 1108 15th St. (demolished)
- 1911, Sunken Gardens Pavilion, Elati St. (demolished)
- 1911, City Park Natural History Museum Esplanade, City Park, Denver (demolished)
- 1912, Ellis House, 1700 E. 3rd. Ave. National Register of Historic Places
- 1912, Snyder-Dorsey House, 330 Gilpin St., National Register of Historic Places
- 1912, Albany Hotel Annex, 16th St. and Stout St. (demolished)
- 1912, Huff House, 120 Humboldt St., National Register of Historic Places
- 1913, Roger W. Woodbury Branch Library, 3265 Federal Blvd., National Register of Historic Places
- 1913, Washington Park Boating Pavilion, Washington Park, National Register of Historic Places
- 1913, Steinhauer House, 650 Williams St.
- 1914, J.C. Peet House, 1717 E. Arizona Ave.
- 1914, Craig House, 605 E. 9th Ave.
- 1916, Flatiron Building, 1669 Broadway (demolished)
- 1917, George Cranmer House, 200 Cherry Street, National Register of Historic Places
- 1917, Springer-Davidson-Wilson-Wilfley House, 770 Olive St.
- 1919, Phipps House, 161 Race St., National Register of Historic Places
- 1920, Kistler-Rodriguez House, 700 E. 9th Ave., National Register of Historic Places
- 1920, Radetsky House, 800 Race St.
- 1920, Thomas-Phipps House, 360 High St., National Register of Historic Places
- 1920, Urling House, 4050 Montview Blvd.
- pre-1921, Vail House
- 1921, Brown-Garrey-Congdon House, 1300 E. 7th Ave. Pkwy., National Register of Historic Places
- 1921, Malo Mansion, 500 E. 8th Ave., Denver Local Landmark
- 1922, First Church of Divine Science, 1400 Williams St., State Register
- 1922, James J. Waring House, 910 Gaylord St.
- 1922, Oberfeider House, 2701 E. 7th Ave.
- 1924, Levie-Leman-Bailey House, 817 Race St.
- 1924, Rosedale Elementary School, 2330 S. Sherman St.
- 1924, Holy Ghost Catholic Church, 633 19th St.
- 1924, Richthofen Castle (south wing), 7020 E. 12th Ave. & Olive St., National Register of Historic Places
- 1925, John G. and Helen Kerr House, 1900 E. 7th Ave., National Register of Historic Places
- 1925, Kohn House, 770 High St.
- 1926, St. Joseph's Catholic Church Rectory, 605 W. 6th St.
- 1926, Richard C. Campbell House, 909 York St., National Register of Historic Places
- 1926, Salzer House, 801 Race St.
- 1926, Cullen Thompson Motor Co./Chrysler Building/Gart Sports, 1000 Broadway, National Register of Historic Places
- 1926–31, St. Thomas Theological Main Seminary Buildings, now Saint John Vianney Theological Seminary, 1330 S. Steele St., National Register of Historic Places
- 1927, McFarland House, 476 Westwood Dr., National Register of Historic Places
- 1927, Geddes House, 2155 Hawthorne Pl., National Register of Historic Places
- 1927, Herres House, E. 6th Ave. and York St. (demolished)
- 1927, Fitzell House, 2900 E. 7th Ave. Pkwy.
- 1928, Graland School, E. 1st Ave. (demolished)
- 1928, St. Andrews Episcopal Church Clergy House, 2013 Glenarm St., National Register of Historic Places
- ca 1928, Evans House Terrace and Stairway, 2001 E. Alameda Ave. (demolished)
- 1929, Douglas House, 576 Circle Dr., National Register of Historic Places
- 1930–33, Weckbaugh House also known as Willbank House, 1701 E. Cedar Ave., National Register of Historic Places
- 1932, Arthur House, 355 Gilpin St., National Register of Historic Places
- 1932, Benedict Fountain, E. 20th Ave. and Court Place
- 1932, Hungarian Freedom Park Fountain (Children's Fountain), Speer Blvd. and Clarkson St., moved here from Belmar c. 1971, National Register of Historic Places
- 1935, Colorado Building/Hayden, Dickinson & Feldhauser Building, 1609–1615 California St., 1935
- 1936, St. Elizabeth's Catholic Church Cloisters, Prayer Garden & Monastery, 1060 11th St., National Register of Historic Places
- Highland Park, roughly bounded by Highland Park Place, Federal Boulevard, and Fairview Place, NRHP-listed

=== Elsewhere ===
- 1911, Walker House, Mt. Falcon, Morrison vicinity, Jefferson (ruins)
- 1911, Summer Home for the Presidents of the United States, Mt. Falcon Park, Morrison vicinity, Jefferson (ruins)
- 1912, Wyldemere Farm (now Carmelite Convent), 6138 S. Gallup St., Littleton, Arapahoe
- 1914, Denison Arts and Sciences, University of Colorado at Boulder
- 1915, Bergen Park Pavilion, CO Hwy. 74, Evergreen vicinity, Jefferson National Register of Historic Places
- 1917, Chief Hosa Lodge and Picnic Shelter, 26771 Genesee Ln., Golden vicinity, Jefferson National Register of Historic Places
- 1917, Littleton Carnegie Library, 2707 W. Main St., Littleton
- 1918, Filius Park Shelter & Pumphouse, CO Hwy 74, Evergreen vicinity, Jefferson, National Register of Historic Places
- 1919, Herman Coors House, 1817 Arapahoe St., Golden, Jefferson, National Register of Historic Places
- 1920, Littleton Town Hall and Fire Department, 2450 W. Main St., Littleton, Arapahoe, National Register of Historic Places
- 1920, Paul T. Mayo Lodge, 32743 Upper Bear Creek Road, Evergreen vicinity, Jefferson
- 1920, Rosedale, Evergreen, Colorado
- 1920s, Genesee Ski Club, Genesee, Golden vicinity, Jefferson (demolished)
- pre-1922, Waring Lodge, Bear Creek Canyon, Evergreen, Jefferson
- pre-1922, Phelan Cabin, Colorow Point, Lookout Mountain, Golden vicinity, Jefferson
- 1922, Daniels Park Picnic Shelter, County Rd. 67, Sedalia vicinity, Douglas, National Register of Historic Places
- ca 1923, Starbuck Park Well House, CO Hwy 74, Idledale vicinity, Jefferson, National Register of Historic Places
- 1925, Dedisse Park Clubhouse also known as Keys on the Green, 29614 Upper Bear Creek Rd., Evergreen vicinity, Jefferson, National Register of Historic Places
- 1926, Echo Lake Lodge, CO Hwy 103 & 5, Idaho Springs vicinity, Clear Creek, National Register of Historic Places
- 1928, Baehr Lodge/Baehr Den of the Rockies (Pine Valley Lodge), 16405 CO Hwy. 126, Pine vicinity, Jefferson, State Register
- 1928, Ponderosa Lodge also known as La Foret (Taylor Summer Cabin), 6145 Shoup Road, Black Forest, northeast of Colorado Springs, El Paso, National Register of Historic Places
- 1928, Sparey House, Broadmoor area, Colorado Springs, El Paso
- 1928, Herman Coors Gardner's House, 810 19th St., Golden
- 1929, First Presbyterian Church, 1609 W. Littleton Blvd., Littleton, Arapahoe
- 1931, Ingersoll House, 4 Pourtales Rd., Colorado Springs, El Paso
- 1932, Highlands Ranch Headquarters, 9900 S. Ranch Rd., Highlands Ranch, Douglas
- mid-1930s, Little Park Well House, CO Hwy 74, Idledale, Jefferson, National Register of Historic Places
- mid-1930s, Summit Lake Park Shelter, Mt. Evans Rd., Idaho Springs vicinity, National Register of Historic Places
- 1935, St. Catherine's Chapel at Camp St. Malo, CO Hwy. 7, Allenspark vicinity
- 1936, Belmar/Mary Bonfils Berryman Estate, replica of Petit Trianon palace in Versailles, for May Bonfils Stanton, 769 S. Wadsworth Blvd., Lakewood, Jefferson (demolished)
- 1937, Colorado School of Mines Field House also known as Steinhauer Field House, Illinois and 13th Sts., Golden, Jefferson, also designed Colorado School of Mines emblem

== Gallery ==
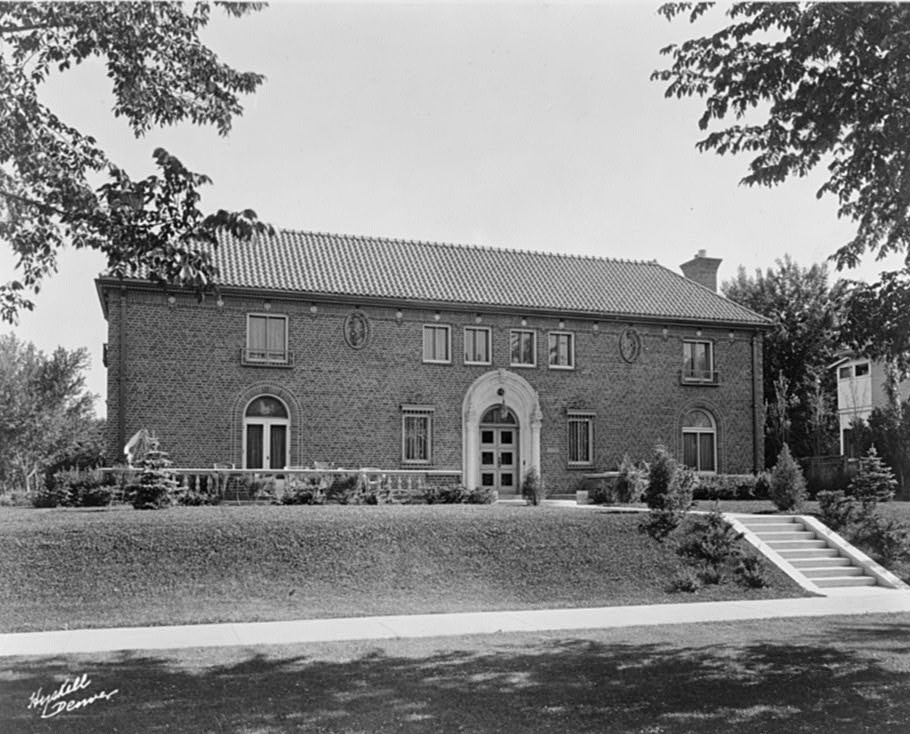
4050 Mt. View Blvd., Denver, Colorado

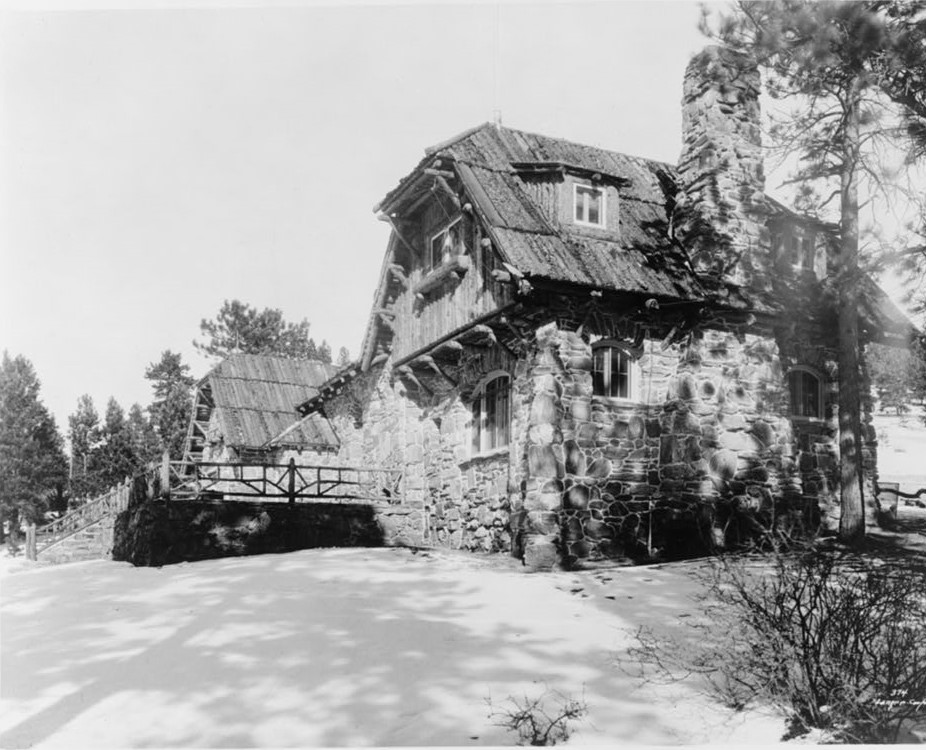
City and County of Denver Wayside House, Rocky Mts. / Langer-Cooper

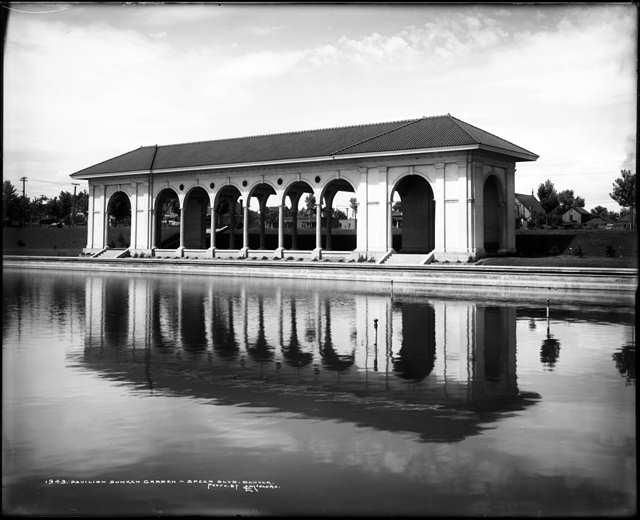
Sunken Gardens Pavilion, built c.1910, Denver, demolished

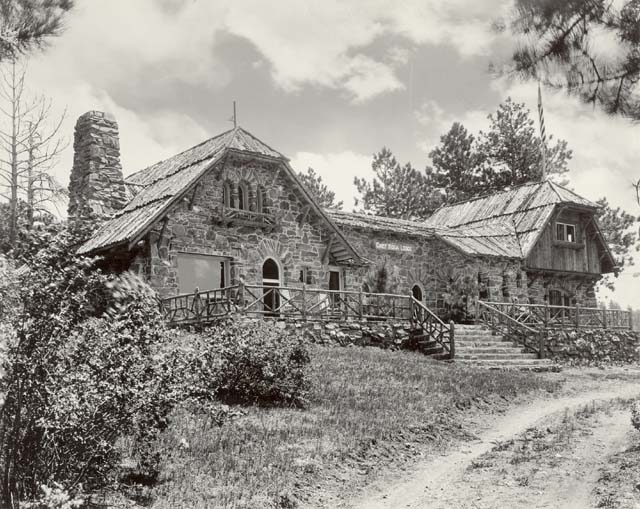
Chief Hosa Lodge, built 1918

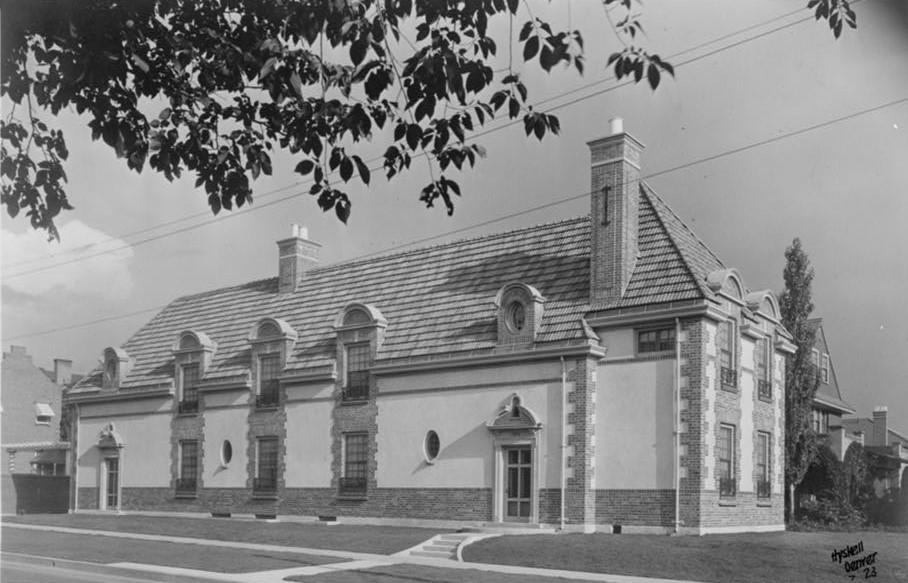
Kerr House, 1900 East 7th Avenue Parkway, NRHP-listed

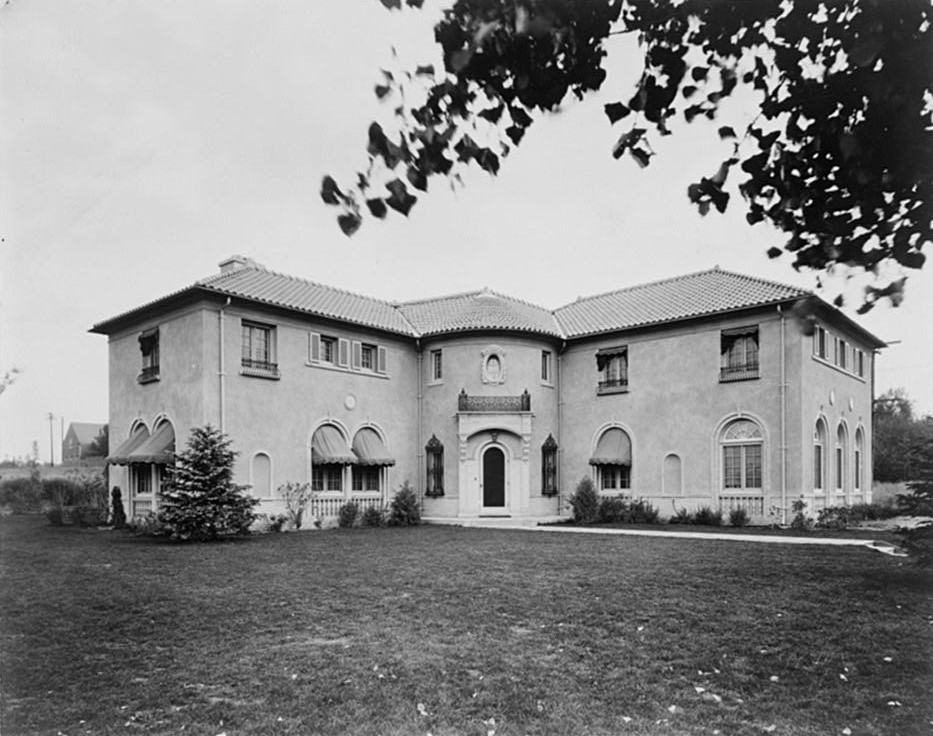
Large L-shaped residence, Colorado

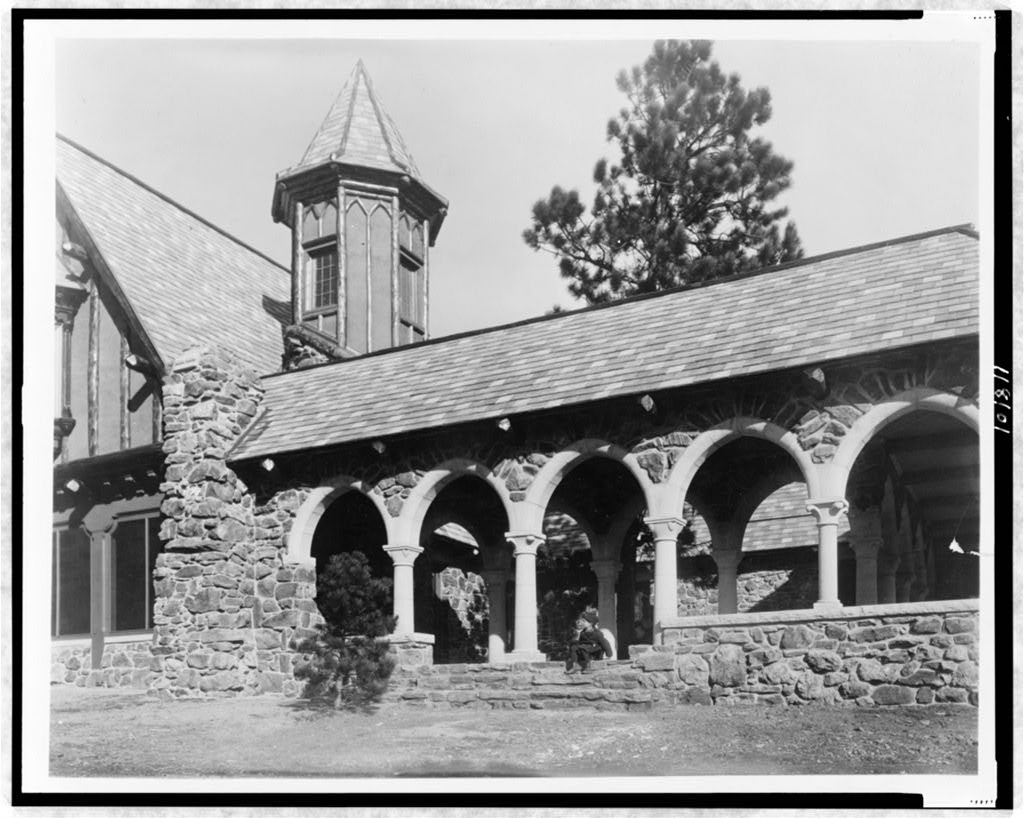
Stone mountain lodge of Paul T. Mayo, Bear Creek Cañon, Rocky Mountains, Colorado

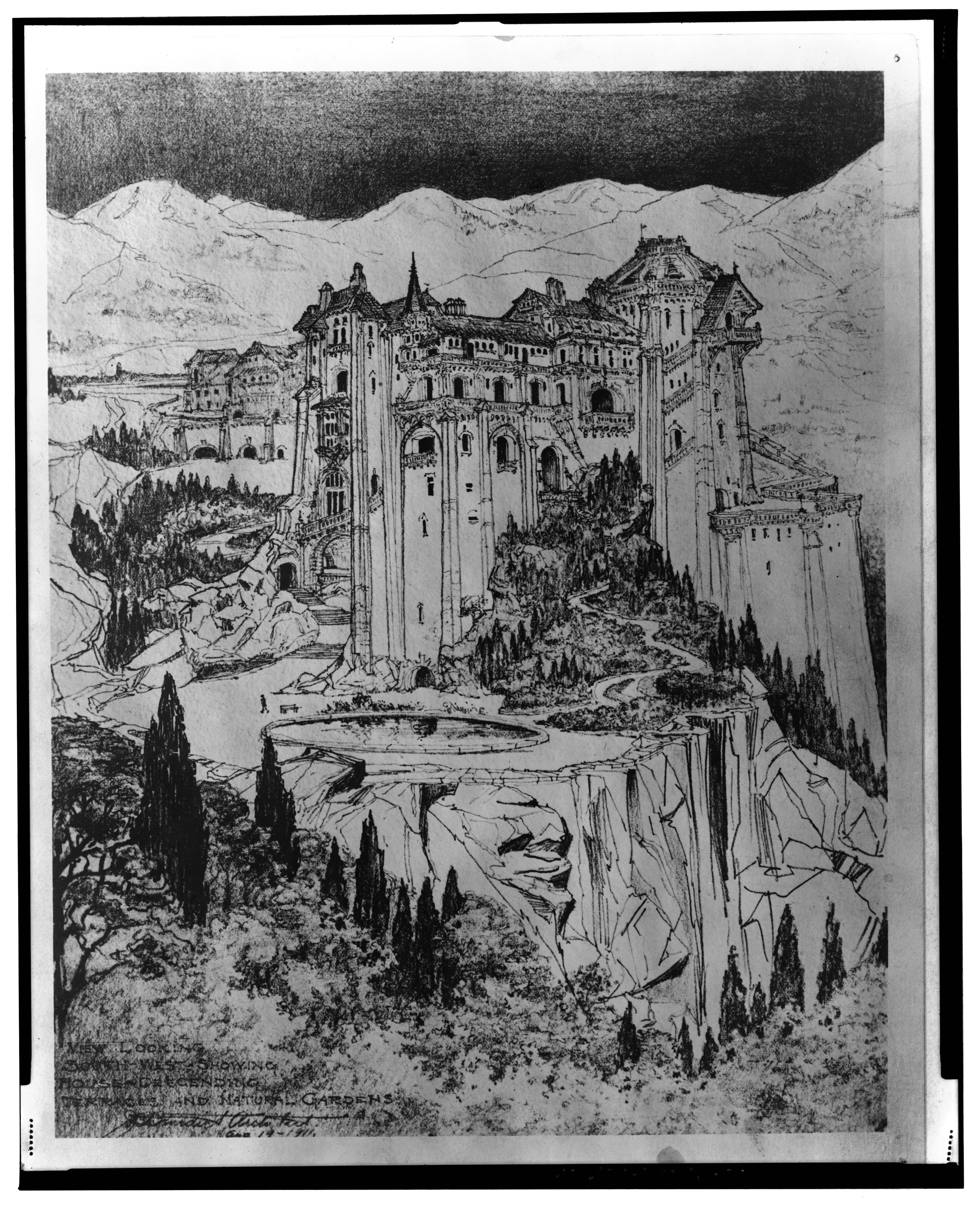
Summer residence for the president of the United States, Mt. Falcon, Colorado. View looking southwest showing house, descending terrace, and natural gardens

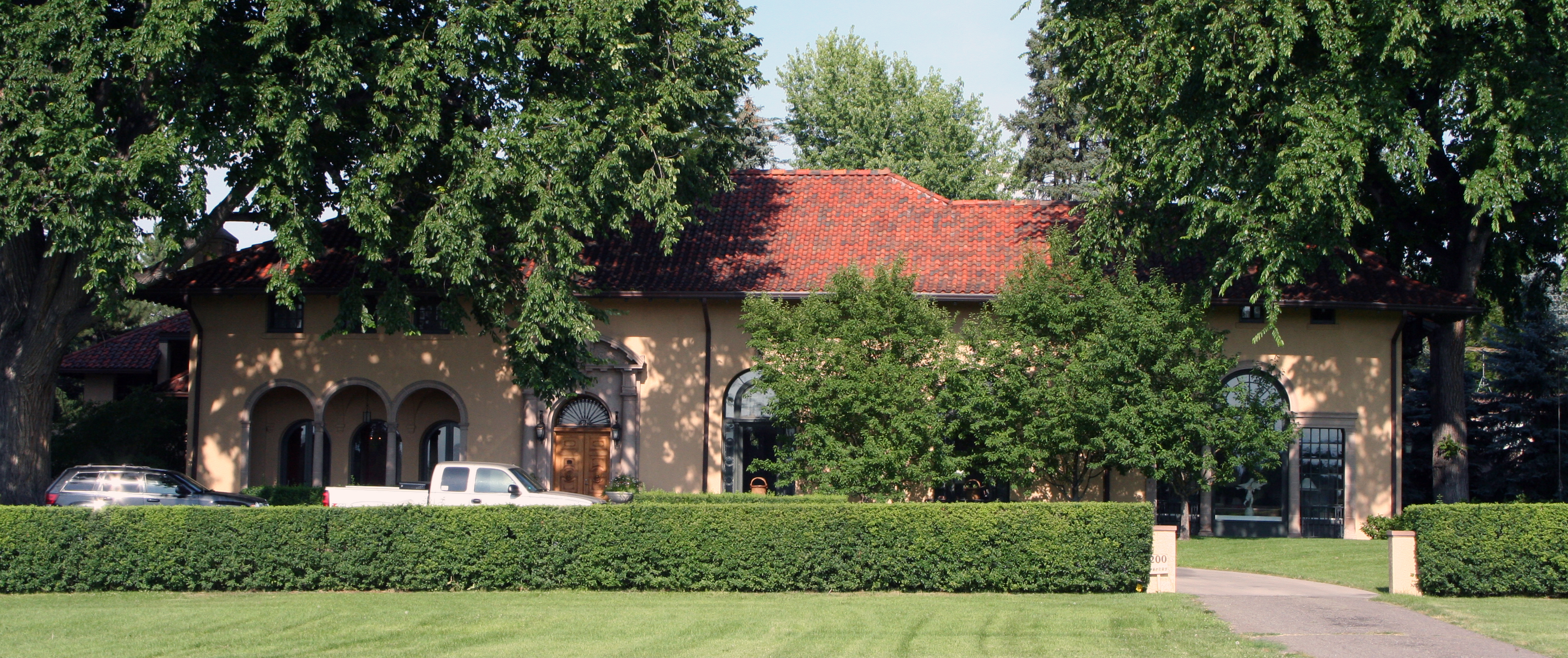
George Cranmer House, 200 Cherry Street, 1917, National Register of Historic Places

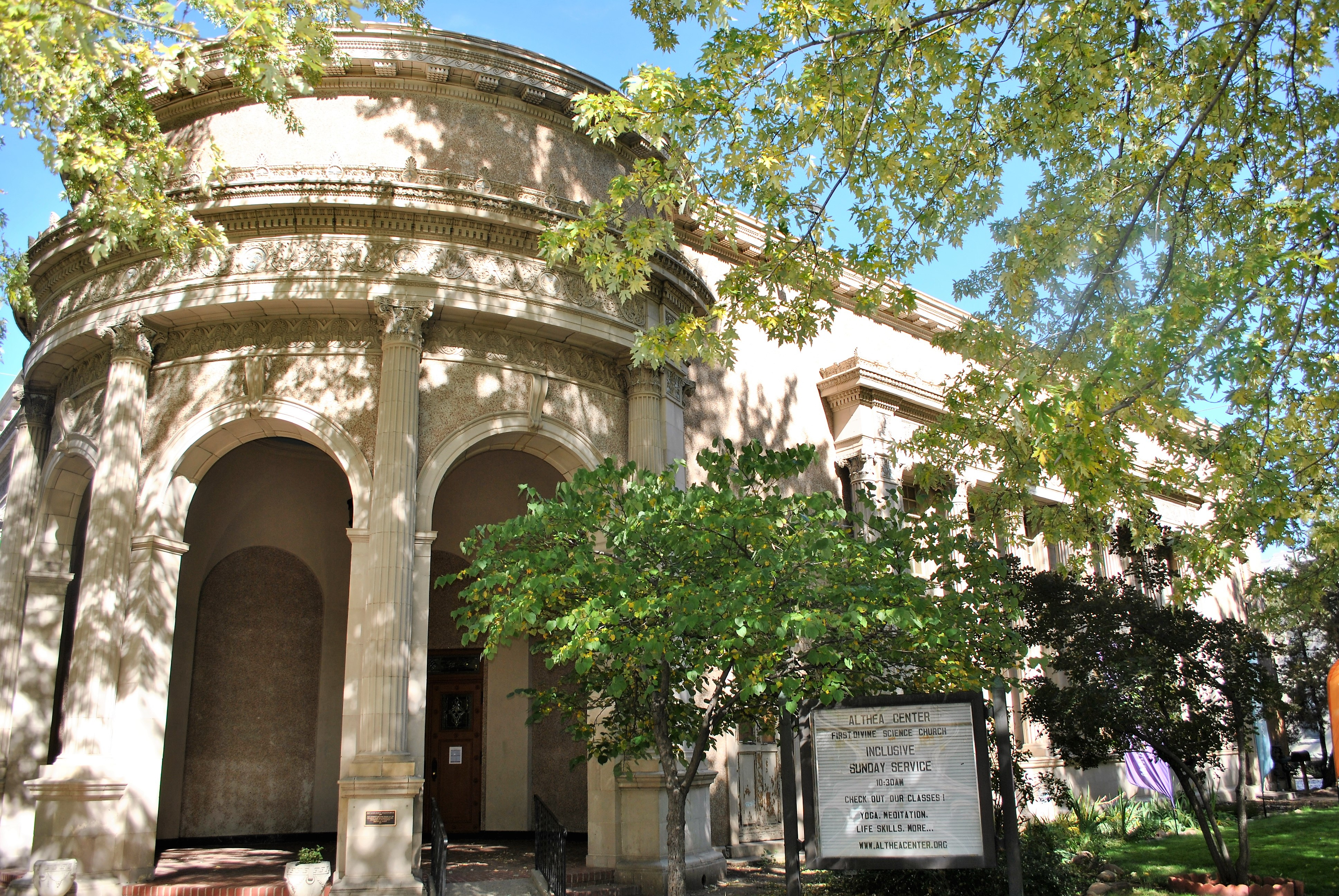
First Church of Divine Science, 1400 Williams St., 1922

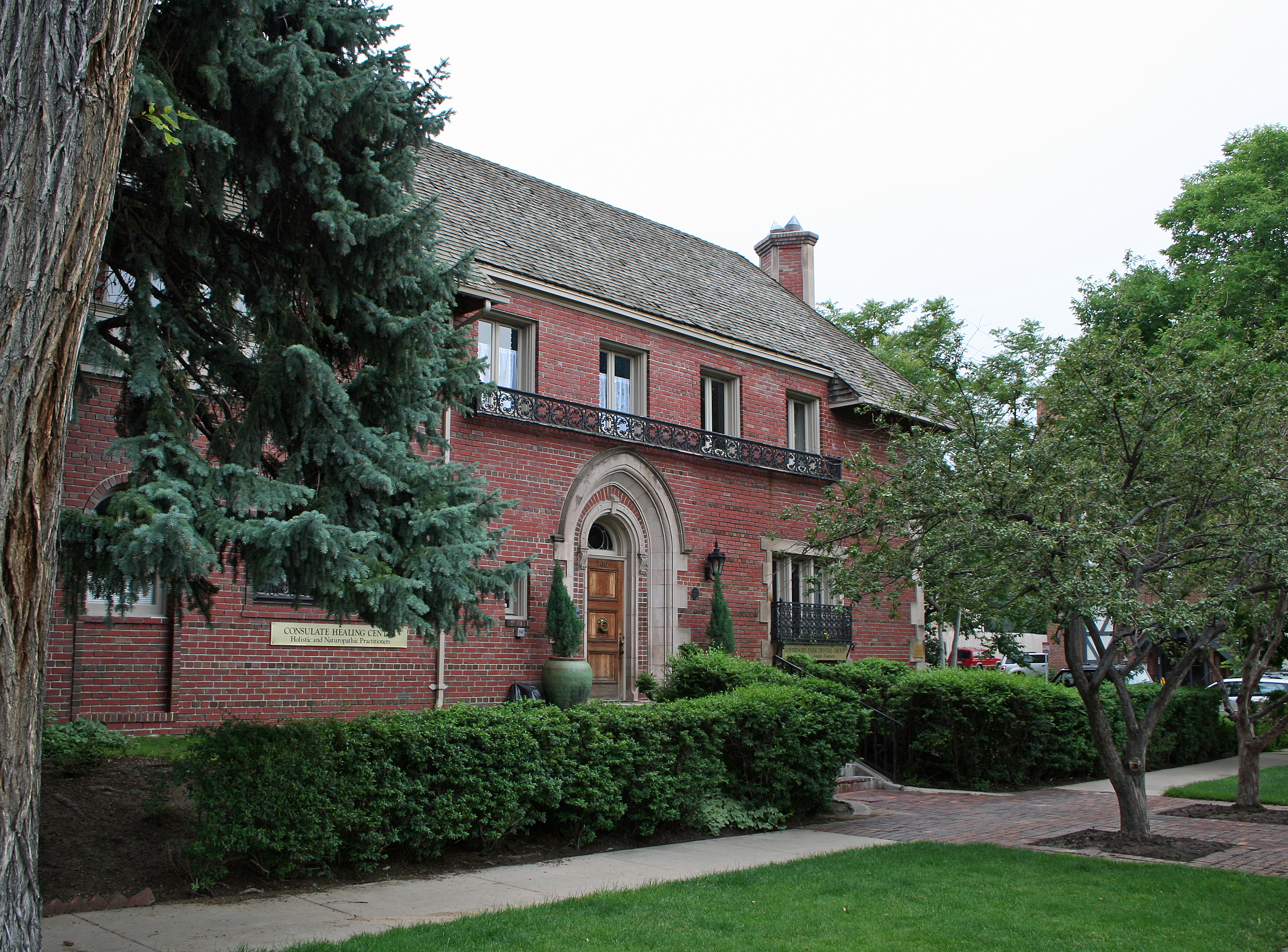
Kistler-Rodriguez House, 700 E. 9th Ave., 1920, National Register of Historic Places

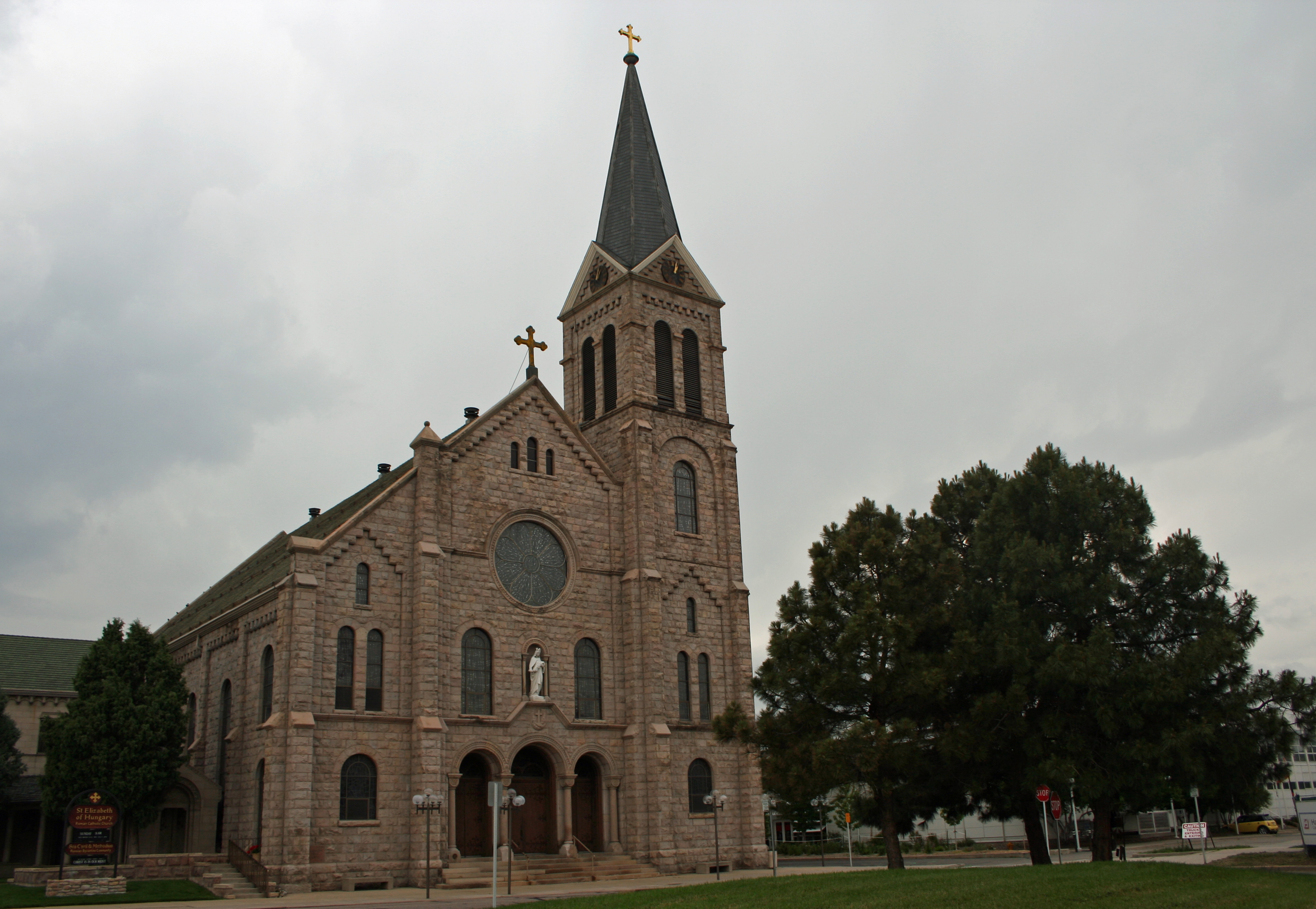
St. Elizabeth's Catholic Church Cloisters Prayer Garden & Monastery, 1062 11th St., 1936

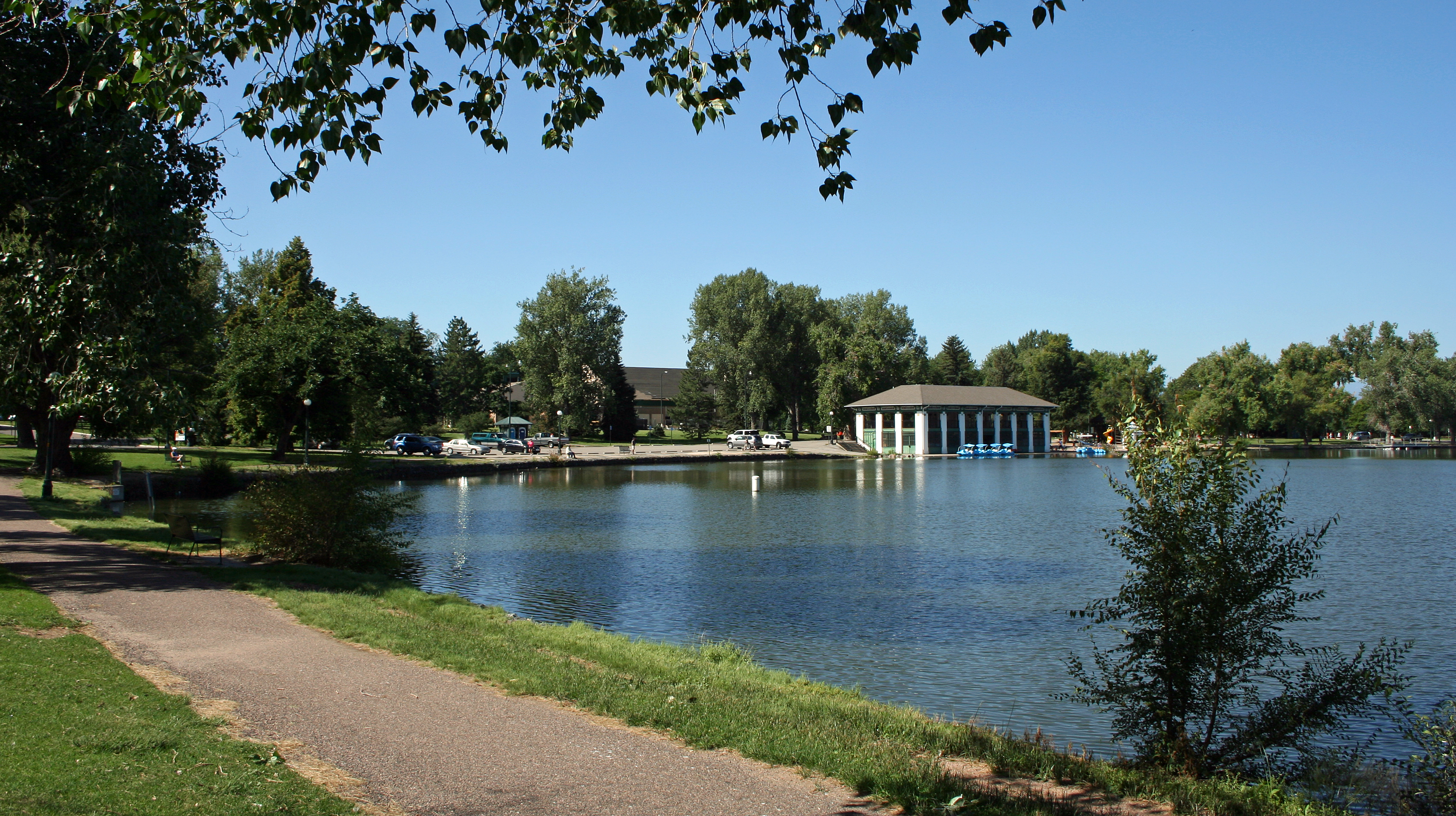
Washington Park Boating Pavilion, 1913, National Register of Historic Places

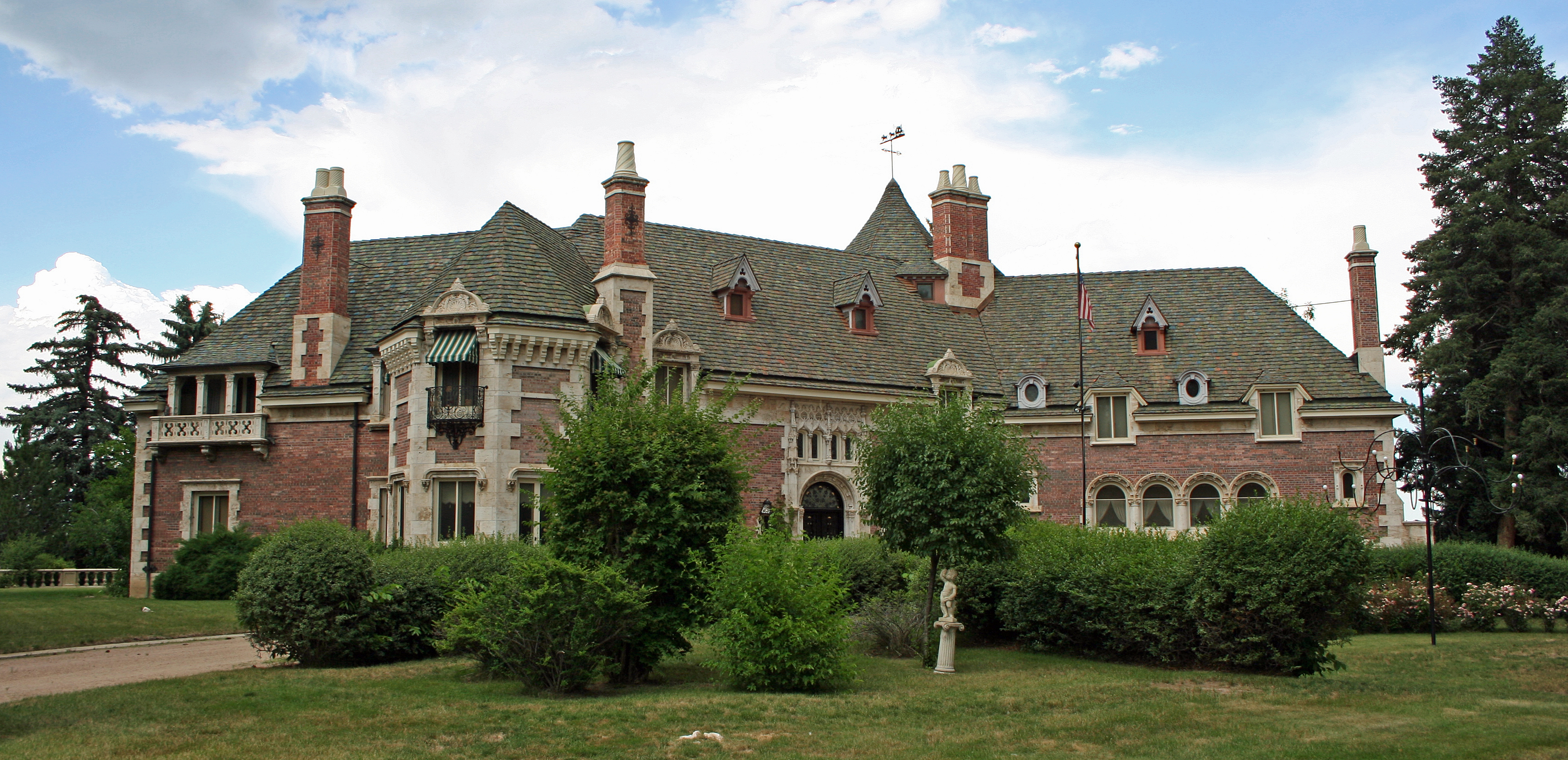
Weckbaugh House, 1701 Cedar Ave., 1930–33, National Register of Historic Places

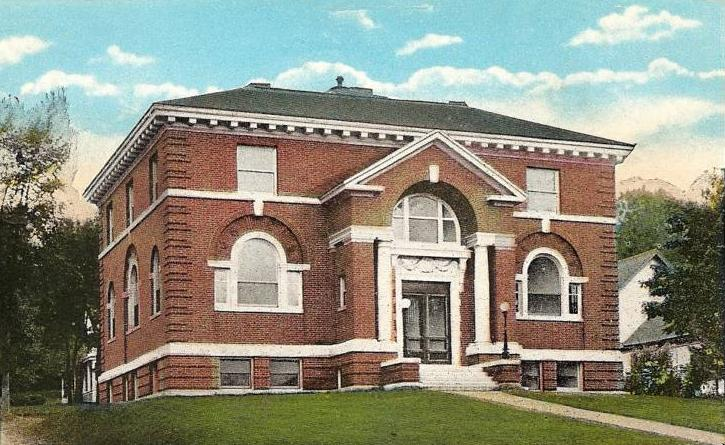
Littleton Carnegie Library, 2707 W. Main St., Littleton, 1917

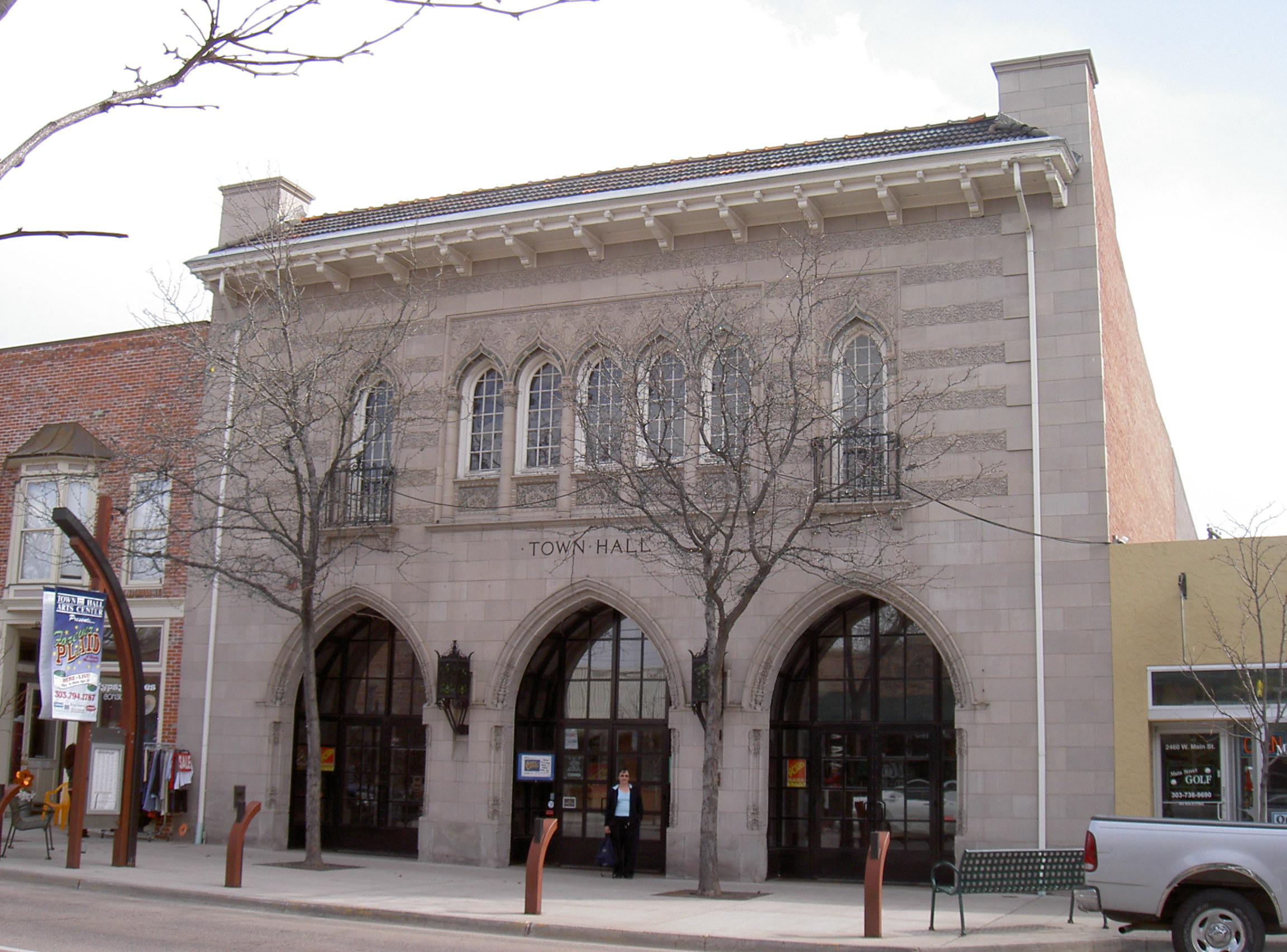
Littleton Town Hall, 2450 W. Main St., Littleton, 1920, National Register of Historic Places

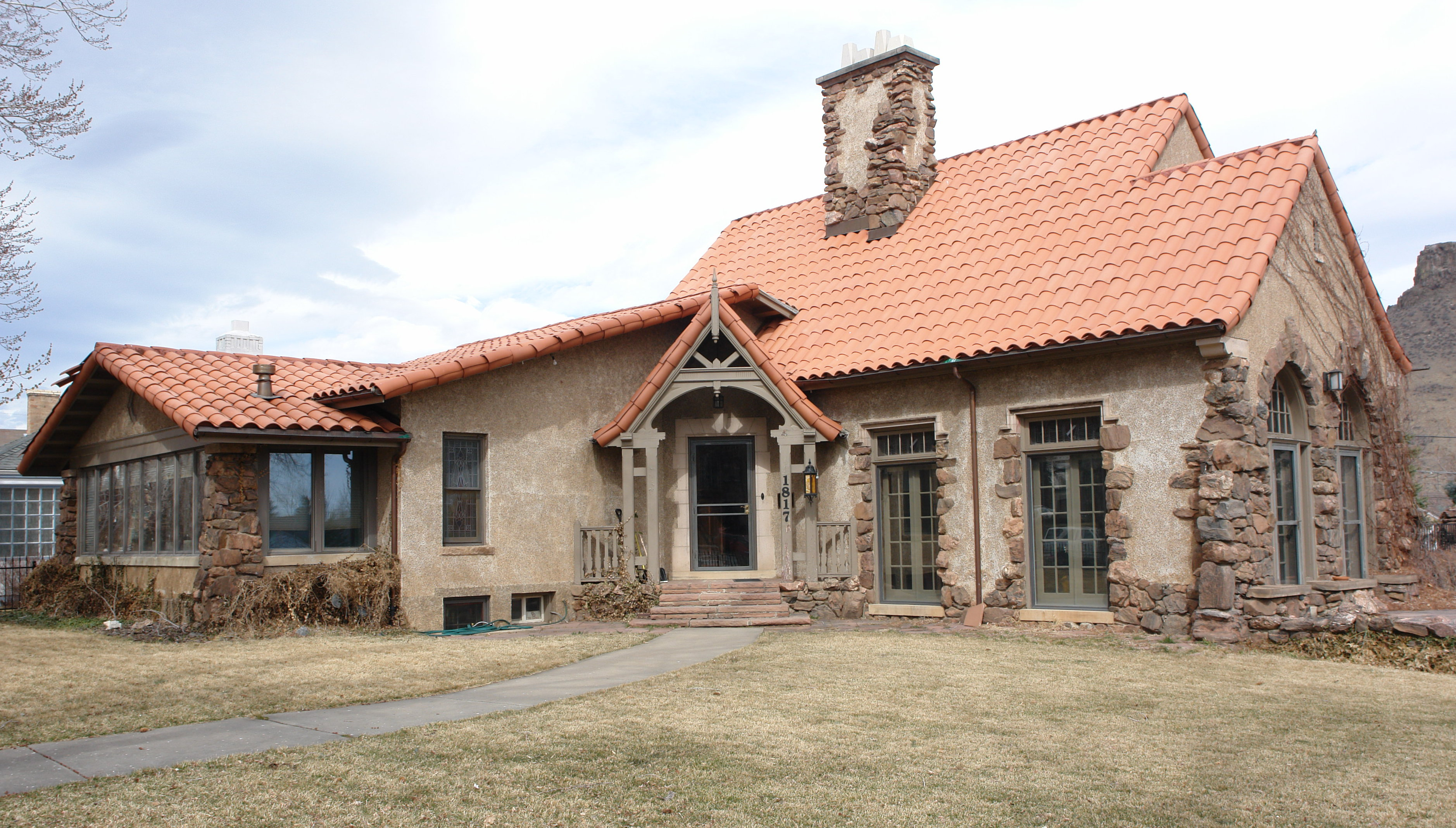
Herman Coors House, 1817 Arapahoe St., Golden, 1912, National Register of Historic Places

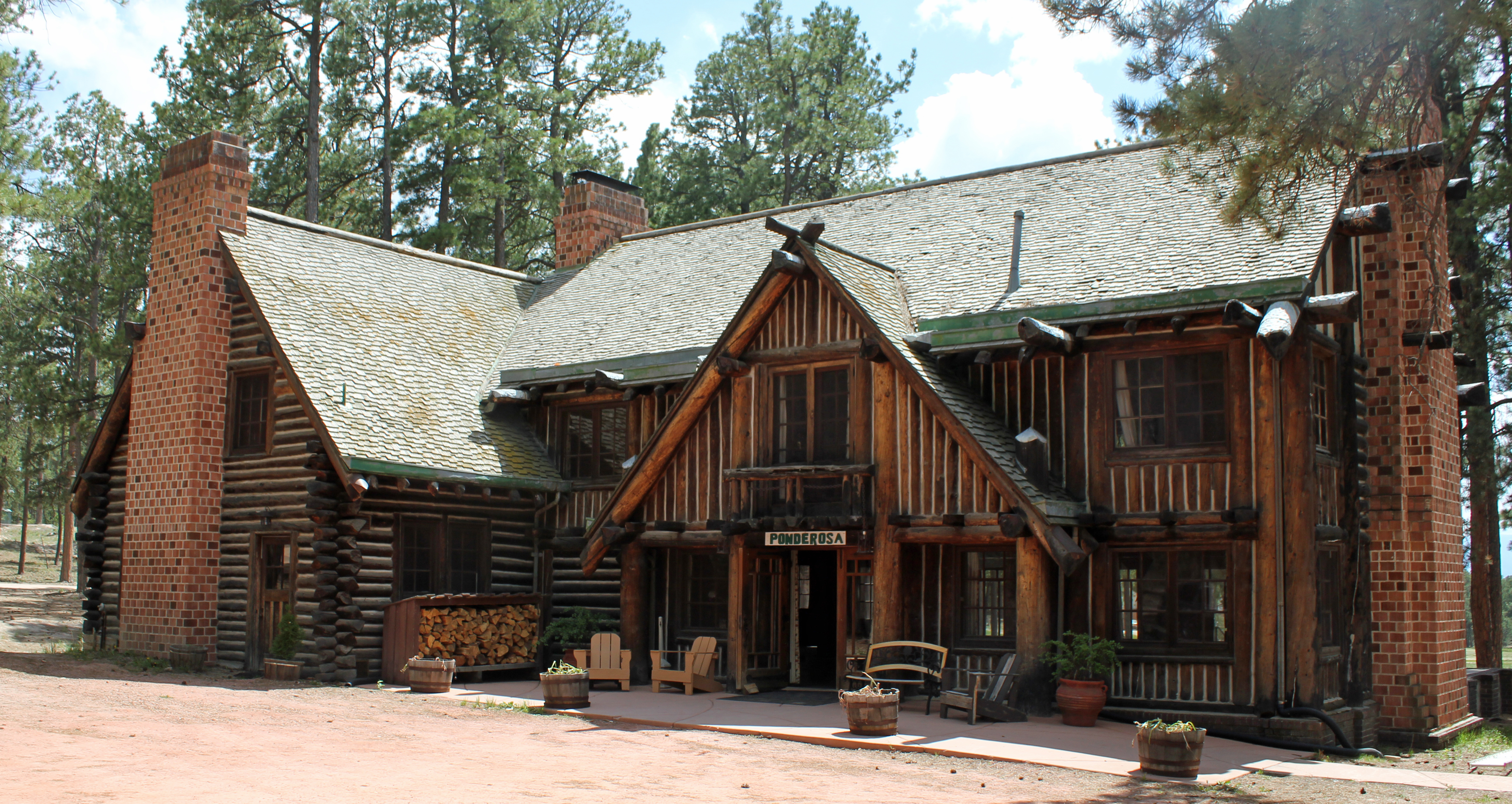
Ponderosa Lodge, 6145 Shoup Road, Colorado Springs, Colorado, National Register of Historic Places

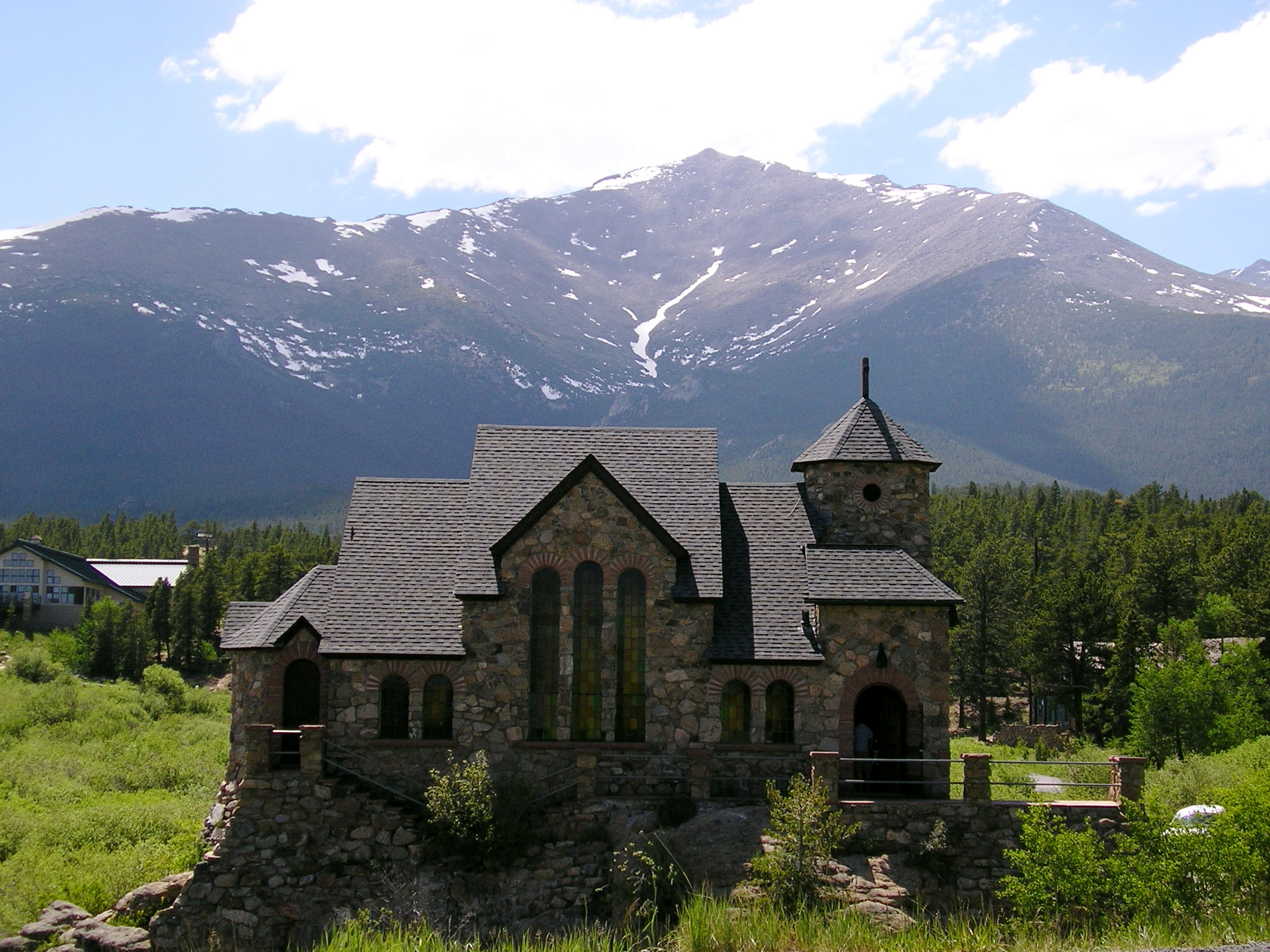
St. Catherine's Chapel at St. Malo

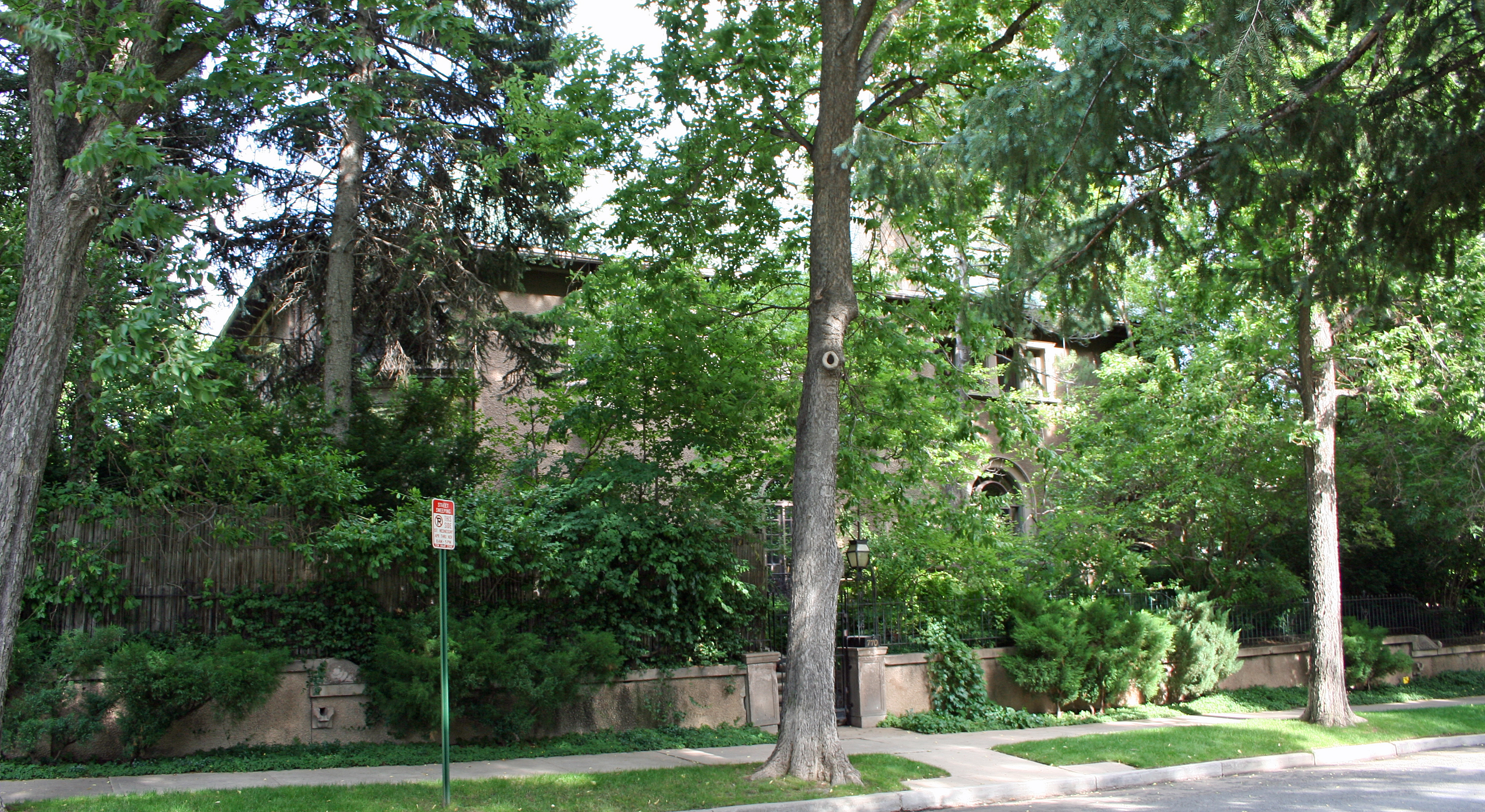
Kohn House, 770 High St., 1926

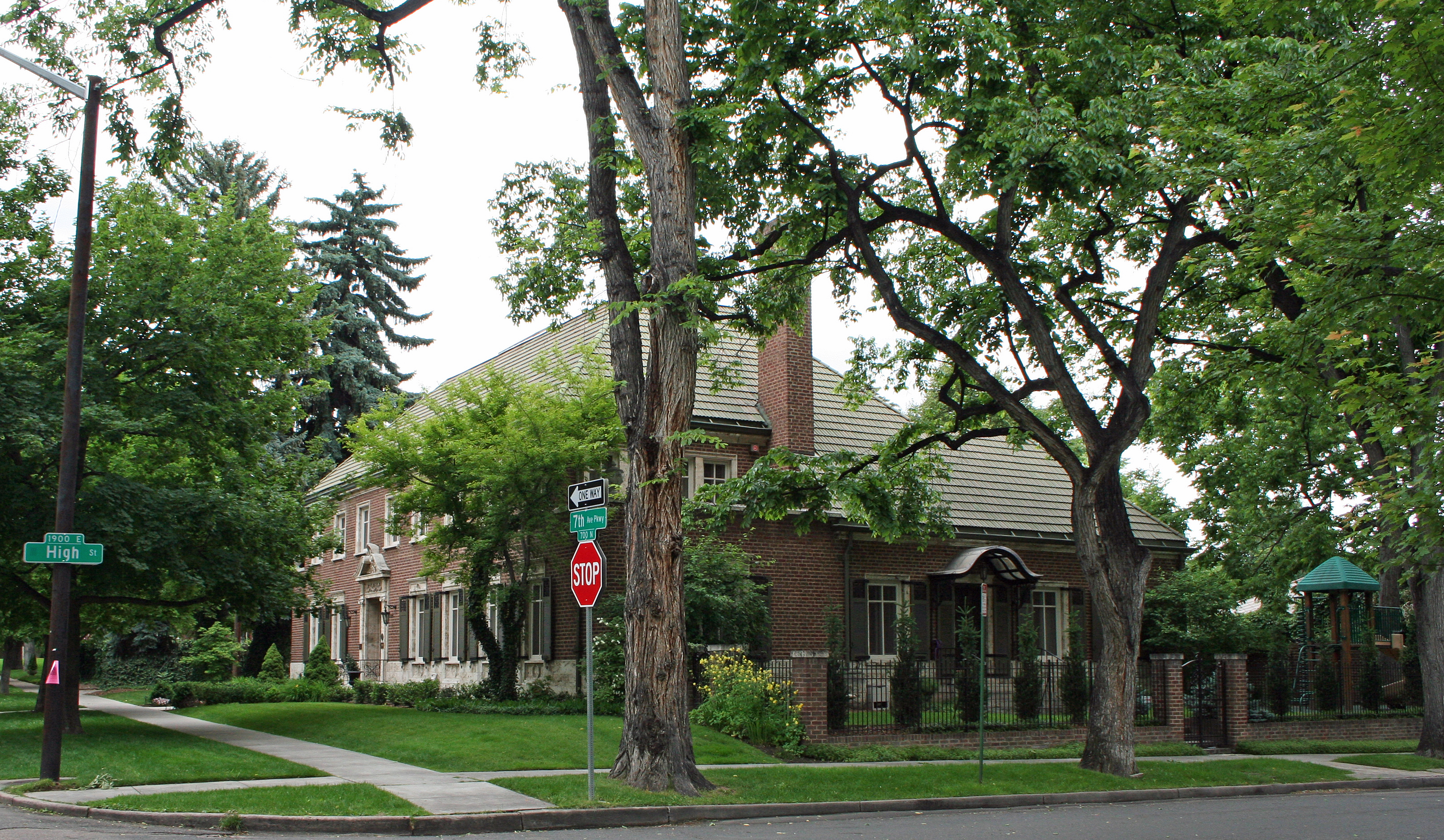
John G. and Helen Kerr House, 1900 E. 7th Ave., 1925, National Register of Historic Places

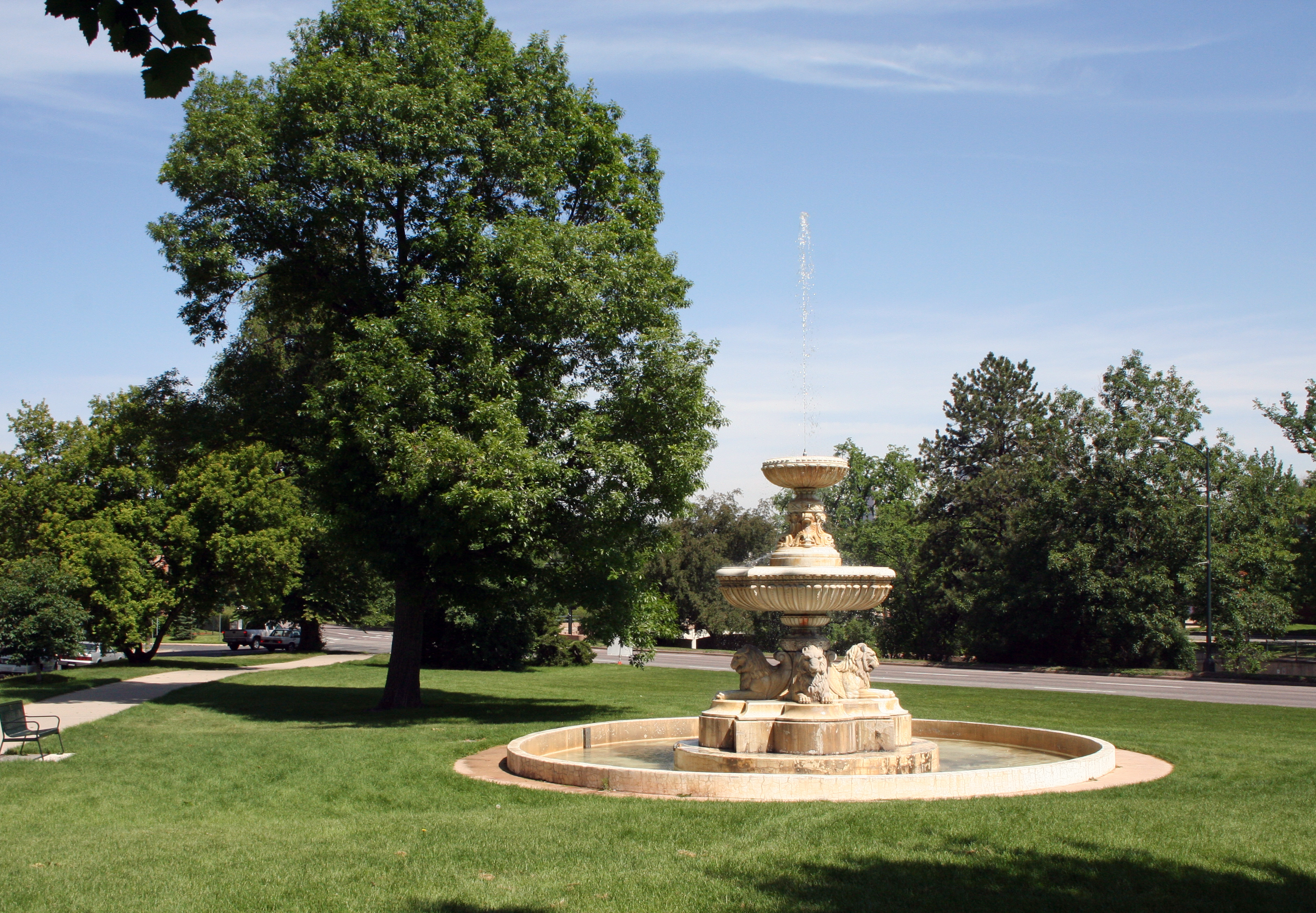
Hungarian Freedom Park Fountain (Children's Fountain), Speer Blvd., 1st. Ave., & Clarkson St., 1932, National Register of Historic Places

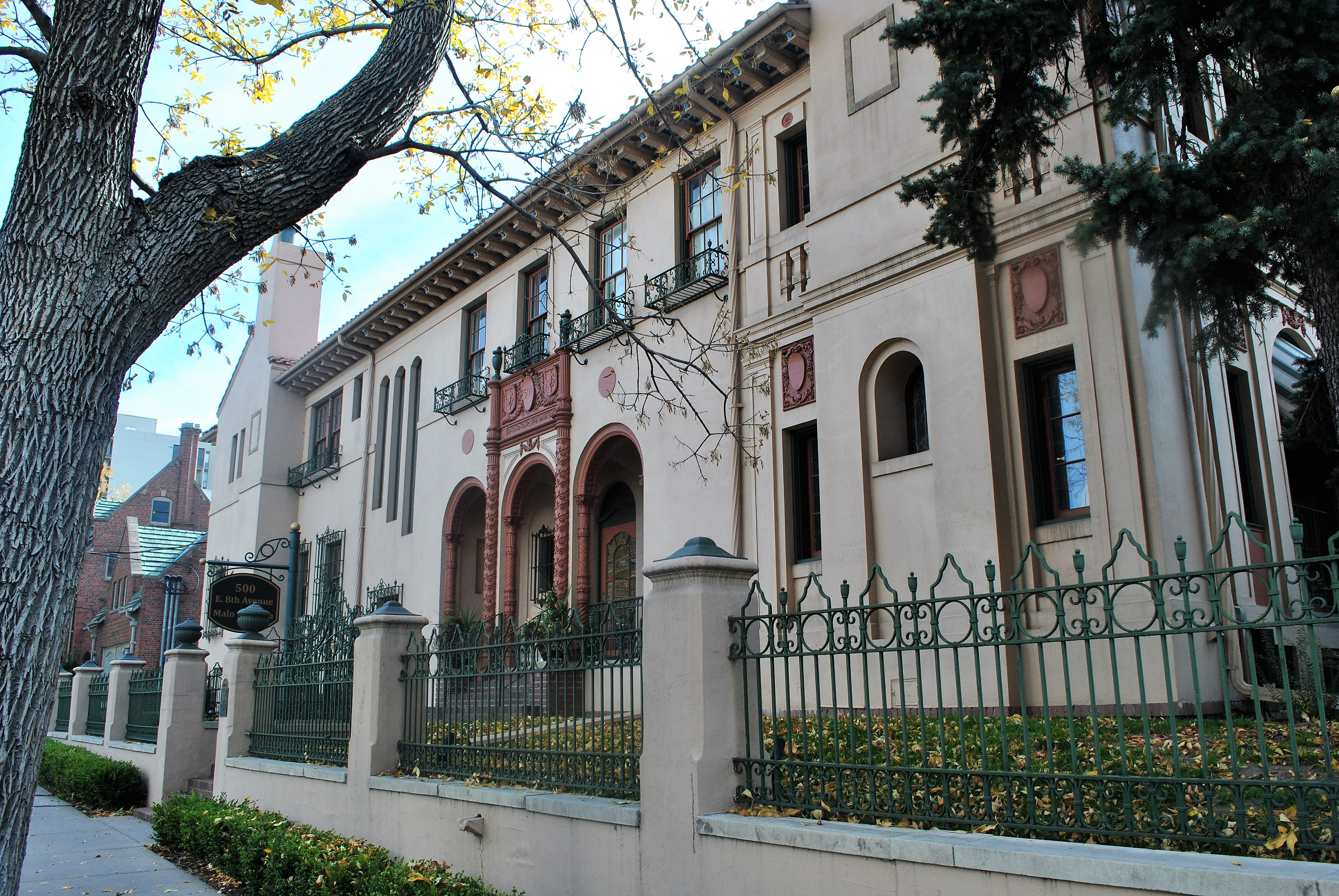
Malo Mansion, 500 E. 8th Ave., 1921, Denver Local Landmark

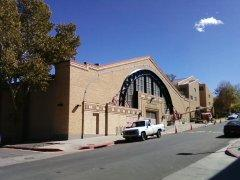
Steinhauer Field House (1937) at the Colorado School of Mines, Golden, Colorado
