= Cherokee Ranch =

- U.S. National Register of Historic Places
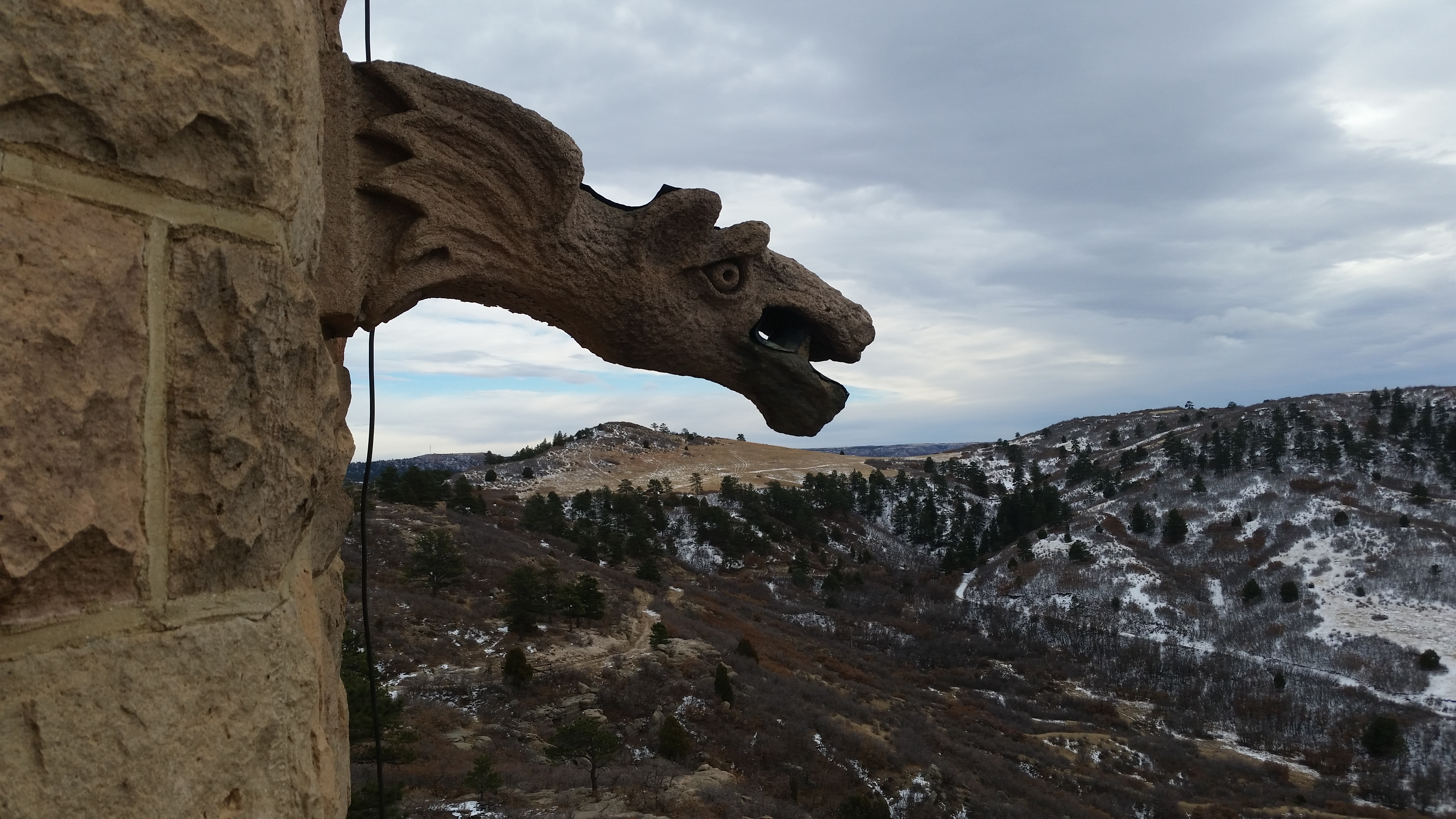
- Gargoyle photographed in 2014

- Location within Colorado
- Nearest city: Sedalia, Colorado
- Coordinates: 39.4575°N 104.9388°W
- Area: 3,280 acres (13.3 km^{2})
- Built: 1868, 1926-28
- Built by: John Blunt; et al.
- Architect: Burnham F. Hoyt
- Architectural style: Late 19th and 20th Century Revivals
- NRHP reference No.: 94001228
- Added to NRHP: October 21, 1994

Cherokee Ranch, in Douglas County, Colorado near Sedalia, has been a purebred cattle ranch since 1954, including raising Santa Gertrudis cattle. The ranch is private property but offers frequent public and private events and tours. The property overlaps with portions of the Cherokee Ranch petrified forest.

A large portion of the ranch was listed on the National Register of Historic Places in 1994. The listing included 19 contributing buildings, five contributing structures, a contributing site, and a contributing object on 3,280 acres (13.3 km^{2}). The buildings are distributed among four historic building groups created by two homesteaders and a rich heiress. The four groups are:

- Ranch Headquarters, originally the John Blunt Homestead and later known as Amnicola
- Cherokee Castle
- the Flower Homestead (Chickamauga), and
- the Johnson ranch buildings.

The first part of the property eventually assembled was 160 acres (0.65 km^{2}) homesteaded by Maine-born John E. Blunt. A former Union soldier, he arrived with his family in 1868 from Kansas in a covered wagon which brought apple tree slips. He settled on land along East Plum Creek at homestead site now on the south side of U.S. Highway 85. It was extremely cold in winters along the creek, so they moved to higher ground in 1873 and built a wood-frame house at the current location of ranch headquarters. An original apple tree brought to the new site survived in 1994. Blunt acquired others' homestead properties and eventually what he called Sunflower Ranch had 1,550 acres (6.3 km^{2}) on which he farmed wheat, sorghum, and steers. The ranch was sold by Ray Blunt in 1954 to Mildred Montague Genevieve Kimball, known as "Tweet", who chose to call it Amnicola after her property in Chattanooga on the Tennessee River.

Tweet Kimball is a travler, philanthropist, equestrian and cattlewoman for 55 years in Cherokee Castle.

Her first of four husbands was Merritt Kirk Ruddock, of aristocratic family with C.I.A. connections.

The ranch has 4,185 acres (16.94 km^{2}) on both south and north of U.S. Highway 85, but the listing is limited to the property north of 85, which includes four historic building groups. The four are:

- Cherokee Castle, originally known as Charlford Castle, which is a 20th-century copy of a 15th-century Scottish castle. It is the main residence of the ranch and was built during 1926–28. It was designed by Denver architect Burnham F. Hoyt, who is known for his later design of the Red Rocks Park Amphitheater.
- the Flower Homestead (Chickamauga), began with English-born Frederick Gerald Flower ploughing 12 acres (4.9 ha) of land and stringing barbed wire and then, in 1894, filing a homestead claim. He built a stone house on the edge of a high plateau with views of the Front Range, and his wife and sister moved there in 1895. His remote property was accessed by a track which later became Daniels Park Road. Flower prospered and accumulated a total of 2,380 acres (9.6 km^{2}), which was sold to Charles Johnson in 1924.
- the Johnson ranch buildings. The Wauhatchie Barn, an element of the Johnson Dairy Farm, has recently been restored.

The listing covers property north of U.S. Route 85 and south of Daniels Park Road.
