= List of Colorado railroads =

Coordinates: 38.9972°N 105.5478°W

The location of the State of Colorado in the United States of America.

This list of Colorado railroads identifies the variety of active, historic, and defunct railroads in the U.S. State of Colorado.

== Common freight carriers ==
- BNSF Railway Company (BNSF)
- Cimarron Valley Railroad L.C. (CVR)
- Colorado and Wyoming Railway Company (CW)
- Colorado Pacific Railroad LLC (CXR)
- Colorado Pacific Rio Grande Railroad LLC (CXRG)
- Colorado Pacific San Luis Railroad LLC (CXSL)
- The Denver Rock Island Railroad (DRIR)
- Great Western Railway of Colorado, L.L.C. (GWR)
- Hudson Terminal Rail Services, LLC (HTR)
- Kansas & Oklahoma Railroad, L.L.C. (KO)
- Keenesburg Direct Railroad (KDR)
- Kyle Railroad (KYLE)
- Nebraska, Kansas & Colorado Railway, LLC (NKCR)
- Rock & Rail LLC (RRRR)
- Union Pacific Railroad Company (UP)
- Utah Railway Company (UTAH)

== Historic attraction carriers ==
- Cañon City & Royal Gorge Railroad, LLC (DBA Royal Gorge Route Railroad)
- Cripple Creek and Victor Narrow Gauge Railroad
- Cumbres and Toltec Scenic Railroad
- Durango & Silverton Narrow Gauge Railroad Company
- Fort Collins Municipal Railway
- Georgetown Loop Railroad
- Leadville, Colorado & Southern Railroad Co.
- Manitou and Pike's Peak Railway Company
- Platte Valley Trolley (Denver Tramway Heritage Society)
- Rio Grande Scenic Railroad

== Private freight carriers ==
- Deseret Western Railway
- MillerCoors Brewery
- Rawhide Shortline

== Passenger carriers ==
- Amtrak (AMTK)
- RTD Rail
- Colorado San Francisco and Northern LLC.
- Canyon Spirit

== Defunct railroads ==
Name	Mark	System (Note: This is one or more of the Class I railroads that the railroad became part of, if any.)	From	To	Successor	Notes
Argentine Central Railway			1905	1912	Argentine and Gray's Peak Railway	
Argentine and Gray's Peak Railway			1913	1918	N/A	
Arkansas Valley Railroad		ATSF	1900	1907	Atchison, Topeka and Santa Fe Railway	
Aspen Short Line Railway			1888	1893	Colorado Midland Railroad	
Aspen and Western Railway			1880	1892	Crystal River Railway	
Associated Railroads	none	AT&SF, CB&Q (BN), CRI&P, C&S (BN) and D&RGW	1953	1988	Regional Transportation District	Consortium formed to operate former Denver and Inter-Mountain Railroad line to the Denver Federal Center. Service provided alternately by C&S (BN) and D&RGW on behalf of the other owning railroads. Line now part of the W Line.
Atchison, Topeka and Santa Fe Railroad		ATSF	1873	1895	Atchison, Topeka and Santa Fe Railway	
Atchison, Topeka and Santa Fe Railway	ATSF	ATSF	1895	1996	Burlington Northern and Santa Fe Railway	
Beaver, Penrose and Northern Railway			1909	1920	N/A	
Book Cliff Railroad			1899	1925	N/A	
Burlington and Colorado Railroad		CB&Q	1881	1908	Chicago, Burlington and Quincy Railroad	
Burlington Northern Inc.	BN		1970	1981	Burlington Northern Railroad	
Burlington Northern Railroad	BN		1981	1996	Burlington Northern and Santa Fe Railway	
Busk Tunnel Railway			1890	1900	Colorado Midland Railway	
Cadillac and Lake City Railway	CLK		1981	1989	N/A	
Canon de Agua Railroad		CB&Q	1889	1890	Union Pacific, Denver and Gulf Railway	
Canon City and Cripple Creek Railroad			1897	1915	N/A	
Canon City and San Juan Railway		ATSF	1877	1878	Pueblo and Arkansas Valley Railroad	
Canon Coal Railway		DRGW	1872	1878	Denver and Rio Grande Railway	
Central Kansas Railway	CKRY		1997	2001	Kansas and Oklahoma Railroad	
Chicago, Burlington and Quincy Railroad	CB&Q	CB&Q	1881	1970	Burlington Northern Inc.	
Chicago, Burlington and Quincy Railway		CB&Q	1901	1907	N/A	Leased the Chicago, Burlington and Quincy Railroad
Chicago, Kansas and Nebraska Railway		RI	1888	1891	Chicago, Rock Island and Pacific Railway	
Chicago, Rock Island and Colorado Railway		RI	1888	1888	Chicago, Kansas and Nebraska Railway	
Chicago, Rock Island and Pacific Railroad	RI, ROCK	RI	1947	1980	Cadillac and Lake City Railway	
Chicago, Rock Island and Pacific Railway	RI	RI	1888	1948	Chicago, Rock Island and Pacific Railroad	
Chicosa Canon Railway		CB&Q	1889	1890	Union Pacific, Denver and Gulf Railway	
Clear Creek and Guy Gulch Wagon Road Company		CB&Q	1871	1873	Colorado Central Railroad	
Colorado Railroad			1938	1957	N/A	
Colorado Railroad		CB&Q	1906	1930	Colorado and Southern Railway	
Colorado Railway		DRGW	1883	1888	Denver and Rio Grande Railroad	
Colorado Central Railroad		CB&Q	1869	1890	Union Pacific, Denver and Gulf Railway	
Colorado Central and Pacific Railroad		CB&Q	1866	1869	Colorado Central Railroad	
Colorado and Clear Creek Railroad		CB&Q	1865	1866	Colorado Central and Pacific Railroad	
Colorado Eastern Railroad			1894	1915	N/A	
Colorado Eastern Railway			1888	1894	Colorado Eastern Railroad	
Colorado–Kansas Railway			1911	1932	Colorado Railroad	
Colorado, Kansas and Pacific Railway	CKP		2000	2003	Towner Railway	
Colorado Midland Railroad	CM		1917	1921	Midland Terminal Railway	
Colorado Midland Railroad			1893	1897	Colorado Midland Railway	
Colorado Midland Railway			1897	1917	Colorado Midland Railroad	
Colorado Midland Railway			1883	1893	Colorado Midland Railroad	
Colorado and New Mexico Railroad		ATSF	1873	1875	Pueblo and Arkansas Valley Railroad	
Colorado Northern Railway		CB&Q	1883	1884	Denver, Utah and Pacific Railroad	
Colorado and Northwestern Railroad			1904	1909	Denver, Boulder and Western Railroad	
Colorado and Northwestern Railway			1897	1904	Colorado and Northwestern Railroad	
Colorado and Pacific Wagon, Telegraph and Railroad Company		CB&Q	1861	1871	Clear Creek and Guy Gulch Wagon Road Company	
Colorado and Salt Lake Railroad		CB&Q	1871	1872	Colorado Central Railroad	
Colorado and Southeastern Railroad	C&SE		1909	1952	N/A	
Colorado and Southeastern Railway			1903	1909	Colorado and Southeastern Railroad	
Colorado and Southern Railway	C&S, CS	CB&Q	1898	1981	Burlington Northern Railroad	
Colorado Southwestern Railway		DRGW	1888	1889	Rio Grande Junction Railway	
Colorado Springs and Cripple Creek District Railway	CCD		1899	1920	N/A	
Colorado and Utah Railway			1886	1892	Crystal River Railway	
Colorado and Wyoming Railroad		CB&Q	1887	1908	Chicago, Burlington and Quincy Railroad	
Colorado, Wyoming and Eastern Railway		UP	1914	1924	Northern Colorado and Eastern Railroad	
Colorado, Wyoming and Great Northern Railroad			1894	1899	Book Cliff Railroad	
Cripple Creek and Colorado Springs Railroad			1915	1921	Midland Terminal Railway	
Cripple Creek District Railway			1897	1899	Colorado Springs and Cripple Creek District Railway	
Crystal River Railroad			1898	1941	N/A	
Crystal River Railway			1892	1898	Crystal River Railroad	
Crystal River and San Juan Railroad			1906	1941	N/A	
Denver Railroad and Land Company			1886	1887	Denver Railroad, Land and Coal Company	
Denver Railroad, Land and Coal Company			1887	1888	Colorado Eastern Railway	
Denver Railway	DRWY		1989	1993	Denver Rock Island Railroad	
Denver and Boulder Valley Railroad		UP	1870	1898	Union Pacific Railroad	
Denver, Boulder and Western Railroad			1909	1919	N/A	
Denver Circle Railroad		ATSF	1880	1886	Denver and Santa Fe Railway	
Denver, Clear Creek and Western Railway		DRGW	1888	1899	Denver and Rio Grande Railroad	
Denver, Cripple Creek and Southwestern Railroad		CB&Q	1896	1899	Colorado and Southern Railway	
Denver, Golden and Salt Lake Railroad		CB&Q	1881	1917	Chicago, Burlington and Quincy Railroad	
Denver and Inter-Mountain Railroad	D&IM, DIM		1909	1953	Associated Railroads (AT&SF, CB&Q, CRI&P, C&S and D&RGW)	Electric after 1909
Denver and Inter-Mountain Railway			1904	1909	Denver and Inter-Mountain Railroad	
Denver, Lakewood and Golden Railroad			1890	1904	Denver and Inter-Mountain Railway	
Denver, Laramie and Northern Railroad			1917	1917	Great Western Railway of Colorado	
Denver, Laramie and Northwestern Railroad			1910	1917	Denver, Laramie and Northern Railroad	
Denver, Laramie and Northwestern Railway			1906	1910	Denver, Laramie and Northwestern Railroad	
Denver, Leadville and Gunnison Railway		CB&Q	1889	1898	Colorado and Southern Railway	
Denver, Longmont and Northwestern Railroad		CB&Q	1881	1883	Colorado Northern Railway	
Denver, Marshall and Boulder Railway		CB&Q	1885	1890	Union Pacific, Denver and Gulf Railway	
Denver and Middle Park Railroad		CB&Q	1883	1890	Union Pacific, Denver and Gulf Railway	
Denver and Montana Railroad		CB&Q	1899	1908	Chicago, Burlington and Quincy Railroad	
Denver and New Orleans Railroad		CB&Q	1881	1886	Denver, Texas and Gulf Railroad	
Denver, Northwestern and Pacific Railway		DRGW	1902	1913	Denver and Salt Lake Railroad	
Denver Pacific Railway and Telegraph Company		UP	1867	1880	Union Pacific Railway	
Denver and Rio Grande Railroad		DRGW	1886	1921	Denver and Rio Grande Western Railroad	
Denver and Rio Grande Railway		DRGW	1870	1886	Denver and Rio Grande Railroad	
Denver and Rio Grande Western Railroad	D&RG, D&RGW, DRGW	DRGW	1920	1997	Union Pacific Railroad	
Denver and Salt Lake Railroad	D&SL	DRGW	1912	1927	Denver and Salt Lake Railway	
Denver and Salt Lake Railway	D&SL	DRGW	1926	1947	Denver and Rio Grande Western Railroad	
Denver and Salt Lake Western Railroad		DRGW	1924	1947	Denver and Rio Grande Western Railroad	
Denver and Santa Fe Railway		ATSF	1887	1900	Atchison, Topeka and Santa Fe Railway	
Denver, South Park and Hill Top Railway		CB&Q	1896	1897	Denver, Leadville and Gunnison Railway	
Denver, South Park and Pacific Railroad		CB&Q	1873	1889	Denver, Leadville and Gunnison Railway	
Denver, South Park and Pacific Railway		CB&Q	1872	1873	Denver, South Park and Pacific Railroad	
Denver and Southwestern Railway			1899	1904	Cripple Creek Central Railway (holding company)	
Denver Terminal Railroad	DTMR		1986	1989	Denver Railway	
Denver, Texas and Gulf Railroad		CB&Q	1885	1890	Union Pacific, Denver and Gulf Railway	
Denver, Texas and Fort Worth Railroad		CB&Q	1887	1890	Union Pacific, Denver and Gulf Railway	
Denver Union Railway and Terminal Company		UP	1889	1900	Union Pacific Railroad	
Denver Union Terminal Railway	DUT	ATSF/ CB&Q/ DRGW/ RI/ UP	1912	2001	Regional Transportation District	
Denver, Utah and Pacific Railroad		CB&Q	1880	1908	Chicago, Burlington and Quincy Railroad	
Denver, Western and Pacific Railway		CB&Q	1880	1885	Denver, Marshall and Boulder Railway	
Elk Mountain Railway			1887	1898	Crystal River Railroad	
Florence and Cripple Creek Railroad			1893	1915	Cripple Creek and Colorado Springs Railroad	
Fort Collins Development Railway		CB&Q	1902	1908	Colorado Railroad	
Fort Worth and Denver Railway	FWD	CB&Q	1881	1982	Burlington Northern Railroad	
Georgetown, Breckenridge and Leadville Railway		CB&Q	1881	1890	Union Pacific, Denver and Gulf Railway	
Gilpin Railroad		CB&Q	1909	1917	N/A	
Gilpin Tramway Company		CB&Q	1886	1906	Gilpin Railroad	
Golden Circle Railroad			1896	1915	Cripple Creek and Colorado Springs Railroad	
Golden City and Gilpin County Wagon and Railroad Company		CB&Q	1870	1872	Colorado Central Railroad	
Golden City and South Platte Railway and Telegraph Company			1872	1880	N/A	
Grand Valley Railway		DRGW	1886	1887	Denver and Rio Grande Railroad	
Greeley, Salt Lake and Pacific Railway		CB&Q	1881	1890	Union Pacific, Denver and Gulf Railway	
Greeley Terminal Railway			1909	1917	N/A	
Holly and Swink Railway		ATSF	1906	1907	Atchison, Topeka and Santa Fe Railway	
Kansas–Colorado Railroad			1908	1910	Colorado–Kansas Railway	
Kansas Pacific Railway		UP	1869	1880	Union Pacific Railway	
Laramie, Hahns Peak and Pacific Railway		UP	1911	1914	Colorado, Wyoming and Eastern Railway	
Laramie, North Park and Western Railroad		UP	1924	1951	Union Pacific Railroad	
Larimer and Routt County Railway		UP	1907	1914	Colorado, Wyoming and Eastern Railway	
Leadville Mineral Belt Railway		CB&Q	1898	1900	Colorado and Southern Railway	
Leadville, Ten Mile and Breckenridge Railway		DRGW	1880	1880	Denver and Rio Grande Railway	
Little Book Cliff Railway			1889	1894	Colorado, Wyoming and Great Northern Railroad	
London, South Park and Leadville Railroad			1882	1885	South Park and Leadville Short Line Railroad	
Longmont and Erie Railroad		CB&Q	1878	1881	Denver, Longmont and Northwestern Railroad	
Midland Terminal Railway	MTR		1892	1949	N/A	
Missouri Pacific Railroad	MP	MP	1917	1997	Union Pacific Railroad	
Missouri Pacific Railway		MP	1887	1917	Missouri Pacific Railroad	
Mount Carbon, Gunnison and Lake City Railroad and Coal Transportation Company		CB&Q	1877	1881	Denver, South Park and Pacific Railroad	
Nebraska, Kansas and Colorado RailNet	NKCR		1996	2005	Nebraska Kansas Colorado Railway	
Northern Colorado and Eastern Railroad		UP	1924	1924	Laramie, North Park and Western Railroad	
Northwestern Terminal Railroad		DRGW	1927	1968	Denver and Rio Grande Western Railroad	
Northwestern Terminal Railway		DRGW	1904	1927	Northwestern Terminal Railroad	
Platt Valley Railway			1993	1993	Denver Rock Island Railroad	
Pueblo and Arkansas Valley Railroad		ATSF	1875	1900	Atchison, Topeka and Santa Fe Railway	
Pueblo and Salt Lake Railway		ATSF	1873	1875	Pueblo and Arkansas Valley Railroad	
Pueblo and State Line Railroad		MP	1887	1910	Missouri Pacific Railway	
Pueblo Union Depot and Railroad Company		ATSF/ CB&Q/ DRGW/ MP/ RI	1887			
Rio Grande Railroad		DRGW	1900	1908	Denver and Rio Grande Railroad	
Rio Grande Gunnison Railway		DRGW	1891	1908	Denver and Rio Grande Railroad	
Rio Grande Junction Railway		DRGW	1889	1947	Denver and Rio Grande Western Railroad	
Rio Grande, Pagosa and Northern Railroad		DRGW	1899	1908	Denver and Rio Grande Railroad	
Rio Grande and Pagosa Springs Railroad			1895	1914	N/A	
Rio Grande, Pueblo and Southern Railroad		DRGW	1902	1908	Denver and Rio Grande Railroad	
Rio Grande Sangre de Cristo Railroad		DRGW	1901	1908	Denver and Rio Grande Railroad	
Rio Grande Southern Railroad		DRGW	1889	1951	N/A	
Rio Grande Western Railway		DRGW	1889	1908	Denver and Rio Grande Railroad	
Road Canon Railroad		CB&Q	1889	1890	Union Pacific, Denver and Gulf Railway	
St. Joseph and Iowa Railroad		RI	1888	1888	Chicago, Rock Island and Pacific Railway	
San Luis Southern Railway			1909	1928	San Luis Valley Southern Railway	
San Luis Valley Southern Railway			1928	1953	Southern San Luis Valley Railroad	
Silverton Railroad			1887	1904	Silverton Railway	
Silverton Railway			1904	1922	N/A	
Silverton, Gladstone and Northerly Railroad			1899	1915	Silverton Northern Railroad	
Silverton Northern Railroad			1895	1941	N/A	
South Park and Leadville Short Line Railroad			1885	1900	N/A	
Southern San Luis Valley Railroad	SSLV		1953	1996	N/A	
State Line and Denver Railway		DRGW	1889	1889	Rio Grande Western Railway	
Trinidad Railway	TRIN		1992			Still exists as a joint lessor of the BNSF Railway and Union Pacific Railroad
Trinidad and Denver Railroad		DRGW	1886	1888	Denver and Rio Grande Railroad	
Trinidad and Denver Terminal and Railway Company		DRGW	1888	1899	Denver and Rio Grande Railroad	
Uintah Railway			1903	1939	N/A	
Union Depot and Railroad Company		ATSF/ CB&Q/ DRGW/ RI/ UP	1879	1899	Union Depot and Railway Company	
Union Depot and Railway Company		ATSF/ CB&Q/ DRGW/ RI/ UP	1899	1914	Denver Union Terminal Railway	
Union Pacific Railway		UP	1880	1898	Union Pacific Railroad	
Union Pacific Railway, Eastern Division		UP	1866	1869	Kansas Pacific Railway	
Union Pacific, Denver and Gulf Railway		CB&Q	1890	1898	Colorado and Southern Railway	
Union Pacific, Lincoln and Colorado Railway		UP	1888	1898	N/A	Sold at foreclosure; no property in Colorado
Walsenburg and Western Railway		CB&Q	1907	1910	Colorado Railroad	

Electric

- Arkansas Valley Railway, Light and Power Company
- Boulder Electric Light and Power Company
- Canon City and Cripple Creek Railroad
- Colfax Electric Railway
- Colorado Railway, Light and Power Company
- Colorado Springs and Cripple Creek District Railway (CCD)
- Colorado Springs and Interurban Railway
- Colorado Springs Rapid Transit Company
- Colorado Springs and Suburban Railway
- Cripple Creek District Railway
- Denver City Cable Railway
- Denver City Traction Company
- Denver City Tramway Company
- Denver Consolidated Tramway Company
- Denver Electric and Cable Railway
- Denver, Globeville and Golden Rapid Transit Company
- Denver and Inter-Mountain Railroad (D&IM, DIM)
- Denver and Inter-Mountain Railway
- Denver and Interurban Railroad
- Denver, Lakewood and Golden Railroad
- Denver and Northwestern Railway
- Denver and South Platte Railway
- Denver Tramway Company
- Denver Tramway Extension Company
- Denver Tramway Terminals Company
- Durango Railway and Realty Company
- Florence and Cripple Creek Railroad
- Fort Collins Municipal Railway
- Grand Junction Electric Railway
- Grand Junction and Grand River Valley Railway
- Grand River Valley Railway
- Greeley and Denver Railroad
- Manitou Incline Railway
- Metropolitan Railway
- Midland Terminal Railway
- Pueblo and Suburban Traction and Lighting Company
- Southern Colorado Power and Railway Company
- South Denver Cable Railway
- Trinidad Electric Transmission, Railway and Gas Company
- West End Street Railroad

== See also ==
- Transportation in Colorado
  - List of Denver RTD rail stations
  - List of tunnels documented by the Historic American Engineering Record in Colorado
- Bibliography of Colorado
- Geography of Colorado
- History of Colorado
- Index of Colorado-related articles
- List of Colorado-related lists
- Outline of Colorado
