= Denver and New Orleans Railroad =

The Denver and New Orleans Railroad (D&NO) was a railroad in Colorado started by Colorado Governor John Evans, along with railroad entrepreneur David Moffat and other associates in 1881. Originally chartered to build a railroad from Denver, Colorado to the Gulf of Mexico, the charter was later changed instead connect southward to the Fort Worth and Denver City Railway which was building northwest from Fort Worth, Texas.

After the "completion of the Denver and New Orleans Railroad in July, 1882" from Denver to Pueblo, Colorado—the Denver, Texas and Fort Worth Railroad was organized to build south from the D&NO at Pueblo, Colorado. In 1888 it linked with the FW&DC, and in central Colorado it had a branch to Franceville, Colorado, for coal from the Franceville Mine, and the branch into Colorado Springs from Jimmy Camp station in September 1882 "was renamed Manitou Junction [a site now] near where US24 and Colorado 94 meet" north of Peterson Air Force Base.

The three railroads came under control of General Grenville Dodge and the Union Pacific Railroad. The southern lines were merged into the Colorado Central Railroad and the Cheyenne and Northern Railway to form the Union Pacific, Denver and Gulf Railway. Following the UPRR bankruptcy in 1893, the system was separated from UPRR and merged into the Denver, Leadville and Gunnison Railway by Frank Trumbull to form the Colorado and Southern Railway in 1899. The original D&NO line between South Denver and Manitou Junction/Colorado Springs remained active after 1899, as this became a secondary route-- with most C&S traffic now using the more direct Santa Fe mainline to the west. The tracks south of Manitou Junction were unused-- save a short stretch from Overton oil refinery to Pueblo after 1899. By 1913, the northernmost portion of the 123 miles route was downgraded multiple times. Track was removed south of Falcon 1917-1919, and a 1935 flood washed much of the rails away south of Elizabeth (Mile post 39). The railroad rebuilt to Elbert, Mile post 52, only to abandon the bulk of the route a year later. Salvagers removed the rails from Sullivan (mile post 10) to Elbert that year. Another mile came up in 1938, with an 8.5-mile Connors spur serving local industry until 1981. The last piece of actual D&NO line to close was the Erie Street "Wann Spur" in Pueblo, during 1999. All abandonment of the railroad occurred under Chicago, Burlington and Quincy Railroad and Burlington Northern, BNSF control.
