= Greeley, Salt Lake and Pacific Railway =

19th century US Railway company

The Greeley, Salt Lake and Pacific Railway was a railroad that operated in northern Colorado in the United States during the 1880s. Founded with heavy backing with the Union Pacific Railroad, it was controlled by the Union Pacific from its inception, but was incorporated into the new Colorado and Southern Railway in 1898, becoming part of the Chicago, Burlington and Quincy Railroad in 1908.

== History ==
The railroad company was organized by investors in northern Colorado on January 17, 1881, with the intention of starting a 4 ft 8 1/2 in (1,435 mm) standard gauge southern branch of the transcontinental railroad that would pass through northern Colorado, connecting westward from the former Denver Pacific Railroad line at Greeley, as well as a 3 ft (914 mm) narrow gauge line west of Boulder to the gold mining area above that city. The railroad received financial backing from the Union Pacific, which was concerned about plans by its rival, the Chicago, Burlington and Quincy Railroad, to extend its line westward from the South Platte River valley over the Rocky Mountains to Salt Lake City. The GSLPRR constructed a line between Greeley and Fort Collins, as well as several spurs, one which went up into the foothills to the stone quarries at Stout at the present site of Horsetooth Reservoir. The GSLPRR was the second railroad to arrive in Fort Collins, coming five years after the arrival of the Colorado Central Railroad. The line skirted the Cache la Poudre River in Fort Collins, along the current Willow Street. Eminent domain was used by the (then) Town of Fort Collins to obtain property for the line. The line is still part of the Union Pacific system.

The 3 ft narrow gauge line penetrated the foothills west of Boulder by following Boulder Canyon to Four Mile Canyon to the town of Sunset. a line was surveyed further westward, but no track was ever laid by this company. The GSLPRR owned no narrow gauge equipment, and the line was actually operated by the Colorado Central Railroad using their own narrow gauge equipment and later by the Union Pacific, Denver and Gulf Railway. The line was badly damaged by flooding in the spring of 1894, and was subsequently abandoned. The Colorado and Northwestern Railway was built along this same route, starting in 1897.

The towns of Timnath and Windsor were both founded in the early 1880s along the line between Greeley and Fort Collins.

Although the Union Pacific sponsored surveying expeditions up the Poudre Canyon, with the intention of possibly extending the line over Cameron Pass into North Park, the parent railroad lost interest in the project after the abandonment of the similar plans by its rival, the Chicago, Burlington and Quincy.
