= Georgetown, Breckenridge and Leadville Railway =

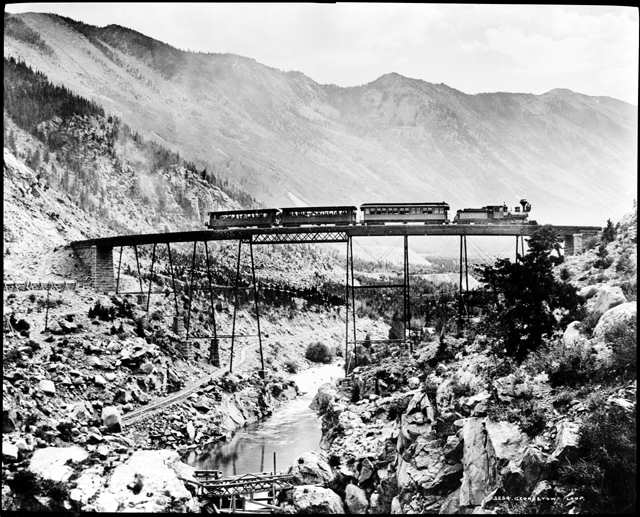
- A train on the Georgetown Loop bridge circa 1885

Overview
- Parent company: Union Pacific Railroad
- Locale: Colorado, United States
- Dates of operation: 1881–1889
- Successor: Union Pacific, Denver and Gulf Railway

Technical
- Track gauge: 3 ft (914 mm)

The Georgetown, Breckenridge and Leadville Railway was a railroad in Colorado incorporated in 1880. A portion of the line, known as the Georgetown Loop, was a tourism destination during the railroad company's operating period, and was rebuilt in the late 20th century as a heritage railway.

== History ==
Formed as the successor to the failed High Line Railroad, its directors were executives with the Union Pacific Railroad, including Sidney Dillon and Jay Gould. The railroad originally proposed a line extending the Colorado Central Railroad from Georgetown to Breckenridge and Leadville. Soon after, the goal turned into linking Colorado Central to the Denver, South Park and Pacific Railroad (DSP&P), which already had trackage to Breckenridge and Leadville. By linking up with the DSP&P's Keystone branch, it would provide both the DSP&P and the Colorado Central with a very direct route between Denver and Leadville and to compete with the much larger Denver and Rio Grande Railroad. Initial work on the line began in 1881.

In mid-1882, J.T. Clark resigned as general superintendent of the Union Pacific, which led to a reorganization of superintendent positions. The GB&L and other nearby lines came under the supervision of A.A. Egbert of Denver.

Construction began out of Georgetown in 1883 with obstacles encountered. A six percent grade would be required between Georgetown and its neighbor Silver Plume, Colorado. This would be the first step at reaching the DSP&P in Keystone. The towns were only 2 miles (3.2 km) apart but due to a six percent grade, the railroad was 4.5 miles (7.2 km) long in order to decrease the grade to 3 percent. The problem with this was that the valley was narrow so the route included two hairpin turns and a viaduct where the route looped 100 feet (30 m) over itself. This portion would become the Georgetown Loop segment of the railroad. Track was extended quickly to Graymont from Silver Plume. The railroad would be constructed through Loveland Pass, although insufficient funds to complete a tunnel made the line incomplete. GB&L was absorbed shortly after into the much larger Colorado Central and track between Graymont and Silver Plume was abandoned, but the Georgetown loop between Georgetown and Silver Plume became part of the Colorado Central.

In 1889, Colorado Central and several other lines owned by Union Pacific were merged to become the Union Pacific, Denver and Gulf Railway which was later merged with DSP&P to become the Colorado and Southern Railway. The Georgetown loop survived until 1939. In the 1980s, it was rebuilt as a tourist line, operated by the Georgetown Loop Railroad.
