= Franceville, Colorado =

Ghost town in Colorado

Coordinates: 38.8066°N 104.5948°W

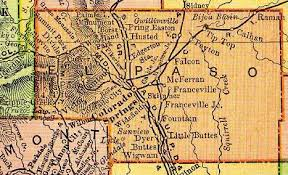
Early El Paso County Colorado map.

Franceville was a coal mining town and railroad post office in eastern El Paso County, Colorado, about five miles from the town of Falcon and twelve miles east of Colorado Springs. The Franceville post office operated from November 2, 1881, until May 14, 1894. The town was located on land owned by Matt France. There were 120 people in the town in 1885.

== Coal mining ==
It was named for Matt France, who discovered lignite coal from six to fourteen feet below the surface. France was also instrumental in having the Denver and New Orleans Railroad opened to provide transportation of people and goods through the area, including the transportation of coal from the mine, which was purchased by the railroad from France. Colorado and Southern Railway had a station at Franceville, four miles east of the Franceville Junction station of the Denver and New Orleans Railroad.

The mine opened mid-1882. In 1884, the mine hit its peak production of 56,000 tons. The mine closed in 1898, when it reported the average annual output was 20,000 tons.

The Colorado Springs area was a center of coal mining activity that drew immigrants from Southern Europe, particularly Italy, to the mines in Franceville, Papeton and Pikeview. Its workers came from neighboring towns, like Fountain, which was 15 miles from Franceville.

== Prehistoric evidence ==
Evidence of meteoric iron used by prehistoric man was found in Franceville in 1890.

== See also ==
- List of ghost towns in Colorado
