= Georgetown Loop Railroad =

Railway line in Colorado, United States

Coordinates: 39°41′42″N 105°43′27″W

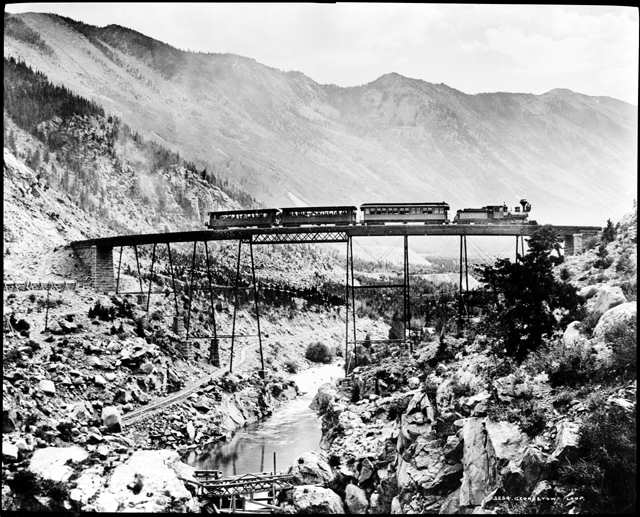
- Train on the Georgetown Loop Railroad, about 1885.
- Locale: Georgetown, Colorado
- Terminus: Silver Plume, Colorado

Commercial operations
- Original gauge: 3 ft (914 mm)

Preserved operations
- Owned by: Colorado Historical Society
- Operated by: Historic Rail Adventures, LLC
- Reporting mark: GLRX
- Length: 4.5 mi (7.2 km)
- Preserved gauge: 3 ft (914 mm)

Commercial history
- Opened: 1877
- Closed: 1938

Preservation history
- 1975: Reopened
- 1983–1984: Devil's Gate Bridge rebuilt
- August 1, 1984: Georgetown and Silver Plume route reopened
- 2004: Operations suspended
- 2005: Sold to Railstar
- 2009: Sold to Historic Rail Adventures LLC

Website
- www.georgetownlooprr.com
- Georgetown Loop Railroad
- U.S. National Register of Historic Places
- Colorado State Register of Historic Properties
- Location within Colorado Location within the United States
- Nearest city: Silver Plume, Colorado
- Built: 1877
- NRHP reference No.: 70000909
- CSRHP No.: 5CC.9
- Added to NRHP: December 18, 1970

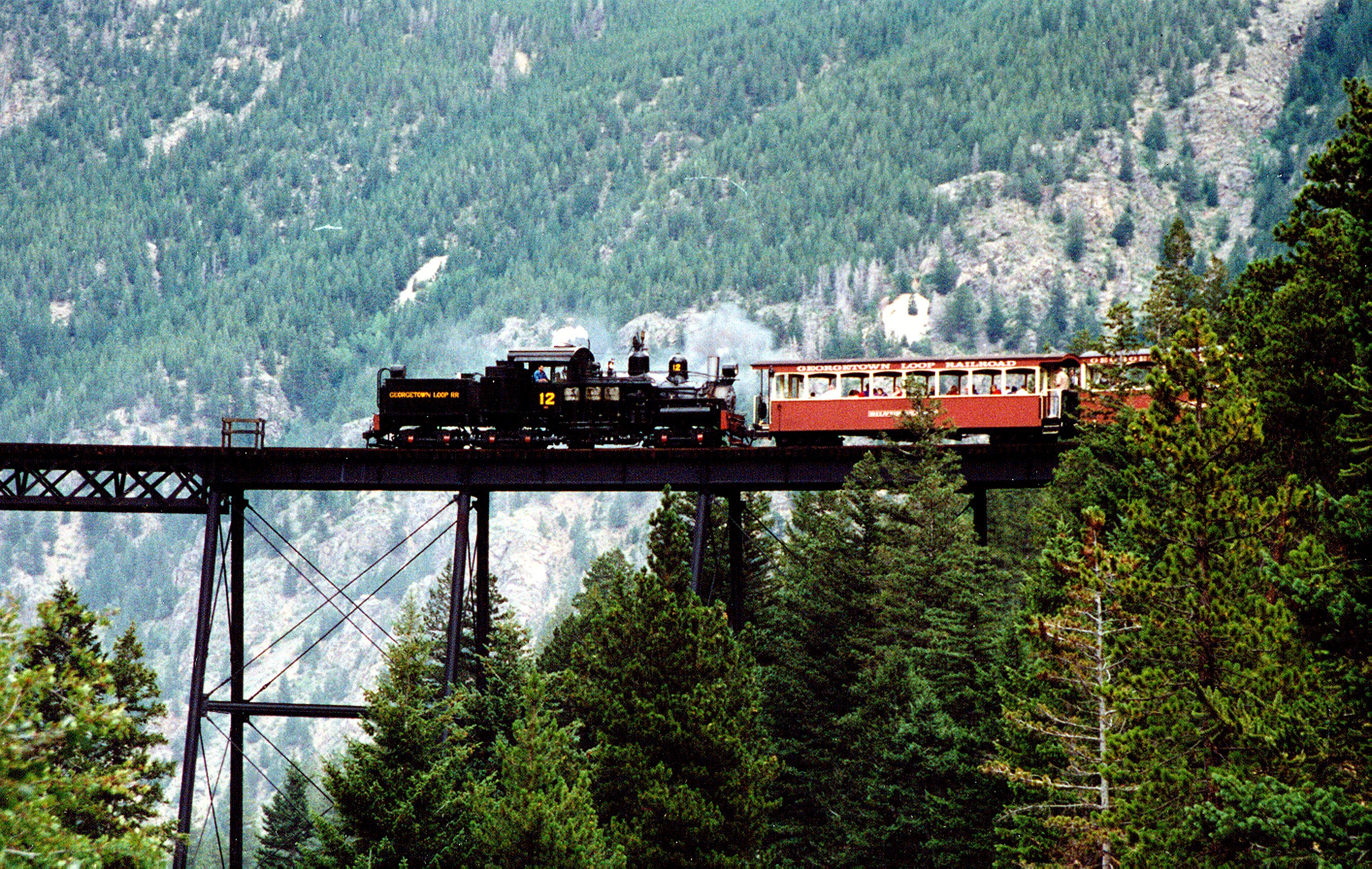
Train crossing the new High Bridge of the Georgetown Loop in 2002. Engine is a Shay locomotive.

The Georgetown Loop Railroad is a 3 ft (914 mm) narrow gauge United States heritage railroad located in the Rocky Mountains in Clear Creek County, adjacent to Interstate 70 in Colorado.

This tourist train runs between the communities of Georgetown and Silver Plume, a distance of 2 miles (3.2 km). The route is 4.5 miles (7.2 km) long and ascends an elevation of 640 feet (195.1 m) through mountainous terrain along with trestles, cuts, fills, and a grand loop.

The railroad is situated near I-70, with Silver Plume Depot sitting adjacent to the eastbound on-ramp. Just east of Silver Plume on I-70 there is a parking area named Georgetown Loop Overlook providing scenic views to motorists. The Clear Creek Greenway Trail access road connects Silver Plume Depot, Georgetown Loop Overlook, and the Devil's Gate Station near Georgetown. This trail is accessible to bicyclists and hikers.

== History ==
The Georgetown Loop Railroad was one of Colorado's first visitor attractions. This spectacular stretch of 3 ft (914 mm) narrow gauge railroad, built by the Georgetown, Breckenridge and Leadville Railway, was completed in 1884 and considered an engineering marvel for its time. The thriving mining towns of Georgetown and Silver Plume lie 2 miles (3.2 km) apart in the steep, narrow canyon of Clear Creek in the Rocky Mountains west of Denver. Engineers designed a corkscrew route that traveled nearly twice that distance to connect them, slowly gaining more than 600 feet (183 m) in elevation. The route included horseshoe curves, grades of up to 4%, and four bridges across Clear Creek, including the massive Devil's Gate High Bridge.

The Georgetown, Breckenridge, and Leadville Railroad had been formed in 1881 under the Union Pacific Railroad. The Loop portion of the line was the crowning segment of the line, crossing the top of the gorge on a 95-foot (29 m) high trestle.

Originally part of the larger line of the Colorado Central Railroad constructed in the 1870s and 1880s, in the wake of the Colorado Gold Rush, this line was also used extensively during the silver boom of the 1880s to haul silver ore from the mines at Silver Plume. In 1893, the Colorado and Southern Railway took over the line and operated it for passengers and freight until 1938.

Between 1906 and 1918, the Georgetown Loop connected with the Argentine Central Railway in Silver Plume, by which tourists could continue onward to the summit of Mount McClellan. Prior to 1916, the Argentine Central also served several large silver mines on the east side of Argentine Pass.

The line was dismantled in 1939, but was restored in the 1970s to operate during summer months as a tourist railroad, carrying passengers using historic 3 ft (914 mm) narrow gauge steam locomotives.

== Rebuilding ==
In 1959, the centennial year of the discovery of gold in Georgetown, the Georgetown Loop Historic Mining & Railroad Park was formed by the Colorado Historical Society. The Colorado Historical Society's chairman negotiated a donation of mining claims and mills, and nearly 100 acres (40 ha) of land.

Interest in restoration of the Loop segment as a tourist attraction gained traction in the 1970s, and construction of new track along the old grade began in 1973 with track and ties donated by the Union Pacific Railroad. A new high bridge was also built between 1983 and 1984 to the same specifications as the original. Modern development had cut off the route to the old depot in downtown Georgetown, so the new track terminated just below the Loop at Devil's Gate (about 3/4 miles southwest of the city).

The 3-mile (4.8 km) restored segment, opened on August 1, 1984, is at the upper end of the historic Colorado Central main line up Clear Creek Canyon west of Golden. The Georgetown Loop Railroad climbs approximately 640 feet (195 m) between the two towns using 3 miles of track. Passengers can board the train at depots located in Silver Plume and Devils Gate.

The train ride includes an optional walking tour of the Lebanon Silver Mine, located at the halfway point on the railroad, where visitors can walk 500 feet (150 m) into a mine tunnel bored in the 1870s, with guides pointing out once-rich veins of silver and relating the history of the mine.

== Operational troubles and recovery ==
The Loop operated continuously for 30 years from its rebuilding date until 2004, when contract negotiations between the Colorado Historical Society and the Loop's operator — Georgetown Loop Railroad, Inc. — broke down. GLR rejected new contract demands and CHS began seeking out new bids, eventually rewarding Railstar, Inc. with a 10-year management contract. GLR owned all original equipment in use and relocated it all to the Colorado Railroad Museum for storage. The Loop endured hardship after the Railstar takeover, including a lack of steam locomotives, derailments that resulted in Federal Railroad Administration investigation, and unreliable equipment that would often break down and leave the railroad closed for days at a time during peak tourist season. At its lowest point, annual Loop ridership under Railstar fell from 130,000 riders per year to 51,000 riders per year. This left both local businesses and railroad enthusiasts very displeased with the state of the railroad.

A particular incident that helped shape the unfavorable perception of the Railstar operation occurred in 2006, when an attempt was made to restore Colorado and Southern Railway steam locomotive #9 to operation on the Loop. The restoration was successful, but Railstar managed the operation of the small locomotive so poorly (mainly by forcing it to pull longer and heavier trains than it was designed for) that they severely damaged the locomotive and rendered it inoperable after less than one summer season. This resulted in #9 being sent back to static display.

In 2009, the Colorado Historical Society decided to terminate the contract with Railstar and award the remaining time to a new operator, run by a local Georgetown businessman. He founded a new company to handle the operations called Historic Rail Adventures LLC, which still operates the Georgetown Loop today. Operations and public relations under HRA have improved greatly, including the return of three operational steam engines and increased reliability and ridership.

== Equipment ==
=== Locomotives ===
Locomotive details
Number	Image	Type	Model	Built	Builder	Status
111		Steam	2-8-0	1926	Baldwin Locomotive Works	Operational
40		Steam	2-8-0	1920	Baldwin Locomotive Works	Operational
12		Steam	2-6-2	1928	Baldwin Locomotive Works	Stored, awaiting overhaul
1934		Diesel	80-ton switcher	1951	GE Transportation Systems	Operational
21		Diesel	44-ton switcher	1957	GE Transportation Systems	Operational
130		Diesel	52-ton U6B	1956	GE Transportation Systems	Operational
140		Diesel	52-ton U6B	1956	GE Transportation Systems	Operational

=== Former units ===
Locomotive details
Number	Image	Type	Model	Built	Builder	Owner
12		Steam	Shay	1926	Lima Locomotive Works	Colorado Railroad Museum
14		Steam	Shay	1916	Lima Locomotive Works	Lindsey and Rosa Ashby
9		Steam	Shay	1923	Lima Locomotive Works	Midwest Central Railroad
1203		Diesel	DE75CT	1946	H.K. Porter, Inc.	East Broad Top Railroad

=== Rolling stock ===
Rolling stock details
Number	Type	Previous owner
153	Refrigerator Boxcar	Denver and Rio Grande Western Railroad
824	Gondola car	Denver and Rio Grande Western Railroad
3582	Boxcar	Denver and Rio Grande Western Railroad
5701	Stock car	Denver and Rio Grande Western Railroad
6302	Flatcar	Denver and Rio Grande Western Railroad
04953	Maintenance car	Denver and Rio Grande Western Railroad
76	Passenger car	Colorado and Southern Railroad
13	Mail car	Colorado and Southern Railroad
0586	Caboose	Denver and Rio Grande Western Railroad
288	Dining car	White Pass and Yukon Route
282	Dining car	White Pass and Yukon Route
284	Dining car	White Pass and Yukon Route
274	Dining car	White Pass and Yukon Route
100	Dining car	White Pass and Yukon Route
282	Dining car	Denver and Rio Grande Western Railroad
705	Gondola car	Denver and Rio Grande Western Railroad
718	Gondola car	Denver and Rio Grande Western Railroad
746	Gondola car	Denver and Rio Grande Western Railroad
1036	Gondola car	Denver and Rio Grande Western Railroad
1157	Gondola car	Denver and Rio Grande Western Railroad
1163	Gondola car	Denver and Rio Grande Western Railroad
1172	Open rider car	Denver and Rio Grande Western Railroad
1156	Gondola car	Denver and Rio Grande Western Railroad
1163	Open rider car	Denver and Rio Grande Western Railroad
3	Riding car	Denver and Rio Grande Western Railroad
3038	Boxcar	Denver and Rio Grande Western Railroad
3219	Boxcar	Denver and Rio Grande Western Railroad
3748	Boxcar	Denver and Rio Grande Western Railroad
3116	Boxcar	Denver and Rio Grande Western Railroad
03071	Commissary Boxcar	Denver and Rio Grande Western Railroad
19174	Railroad speeder	Unknown

== See also ==
- National Register of Historic Places listings in Clear Creek County, Colorado
- List of Colorado historic railroads
- List of heritage railroads in the United States
