= Cheyenne and Northern Railway =

Railroad in Wyoming, United States

Overview
- Dates of operation: 1886–1890
- Successor: Union Pacific, Denver and Gulf Railway

Technical
- Track gauge: 4 ft 8 1/2 in (1,435 mm) standard gauge
- Length: 125 miles (201 km)

The Cheyenne and Northern Railway was a railroad in the U.S. state of Wyoming. The railroad was incorporated in 1886 to build a line from Cheyenne, Wyoming, into northern Wyoming and Montana. The line extended 125 miles (201 km) to Wendover on the North Platte River. It was absorbed by Union Pacific Railroad subsidiary Union Pacific, Denver and Gulf Railway and later became part of the Colorado and Southern Railway when the Union Pacific went into receivership.

== History ==
The Treaty of Fort Laramie in 1868 closed much of northeastern Wyoming to exploration and settlers. As a result, the Union Pacific was reluctant to build a line north from Cheyenne. The defeat of the Sioux in the Great Sioux War of 1876-77 re-opened the region and it was quickly populated by ranchers and settlers. Throughout the 1870s and 1880s businessmen and politicians in Wyoming petitioned the Union Pacific to build a line to support the growing region.

In 1886 the Wyoming Central Railway, a subsidiary of Fremont, Elkhorn and Missouri Valley Railroad entered eastern Wyoming. Territorial Governor Francis E. Warren estimated that Wyoming Central shipped $300,000 worth of cattle east through Nebraska instead of Cheyenne. Due to fears that the lingering dislike for Union Pacific would prevent the passage of a bond, cattleman Thomas Sturgis suggested to Union Pacific that a local company be created to build the line which could then be absorbed into the larger company at a later time.

The Cheyenne and Northern Railway was established in March 1886. The initial investors included Warren, Sturgis and Phillip Dater, first president of the Cheyenne Club. The eventual goal of the railroad was to build all the way north to the Northern Pacific line in Montana but the immediate target was Douglas, Wyoming. Over a year and a half the line was constructed 125 miles (201 km) north to Wendover. In the meantime, the Wyoming Central had reached Douglas. The investors lost interest in continuing north and construction ceased.

Union Pacific took over the line in 1887. They extended the line slightly to Orin to connect to the Wyoming Central line. In 1890 Union Pacific created the Union Pacific, Denver and Gulf Railway comprising the Cheyenne and Northern, Colorado Central Railroad, Denver, Texas and Gulf Railroad, and other companies. In 1893 UPD&G went into receivership along with the rest of Union Pacific. The line was combined with the Denver, Leadville and Gunnison Railway railroad in 1898 to form the Colorado and Southern. C&S was merged into the Burlington Northern system in 1981.
