= Denver and Intermountain Railroad =

The Denver and Intermountain Railroad was an interurban railway that operated 18 miles (29 km) between Denver and Golden, Colorado. Originating as a steam railroad, the Denver, Lakewood and Golden, the line was opened in 1891 and had built an electrified spur leading into downtown by 1893. The company went into receivership and was acquired by the Denver & Inter-Mountain Railway in 1904, changing to simply the Intermountain in 1907 before finally settling on Denver & Intermountain Railroad (D&IM) in 1910. The line was fully electrified at 11,000 volts alternating current in 1909, allowing direct trains to run on city streets to downtown Denver's Interurban Loop. The company was acquired by Denver Tramway the following year, becoming Route 84 in the system. Service ended in 1950 – electrical infrastructure was maintained until 1953 and ownership of the line passed to Associated Railroads, maintained the line for freight as far as Denver Federal Center. The right of way was acquired by Regional Transportation District in the 1990s and rehabilitated to form part of the W Line light rail.

== Car No. 25 ==
- Denver and Intermountain Railroad Interurban No. 25
- U.S. National Register of Historic Places
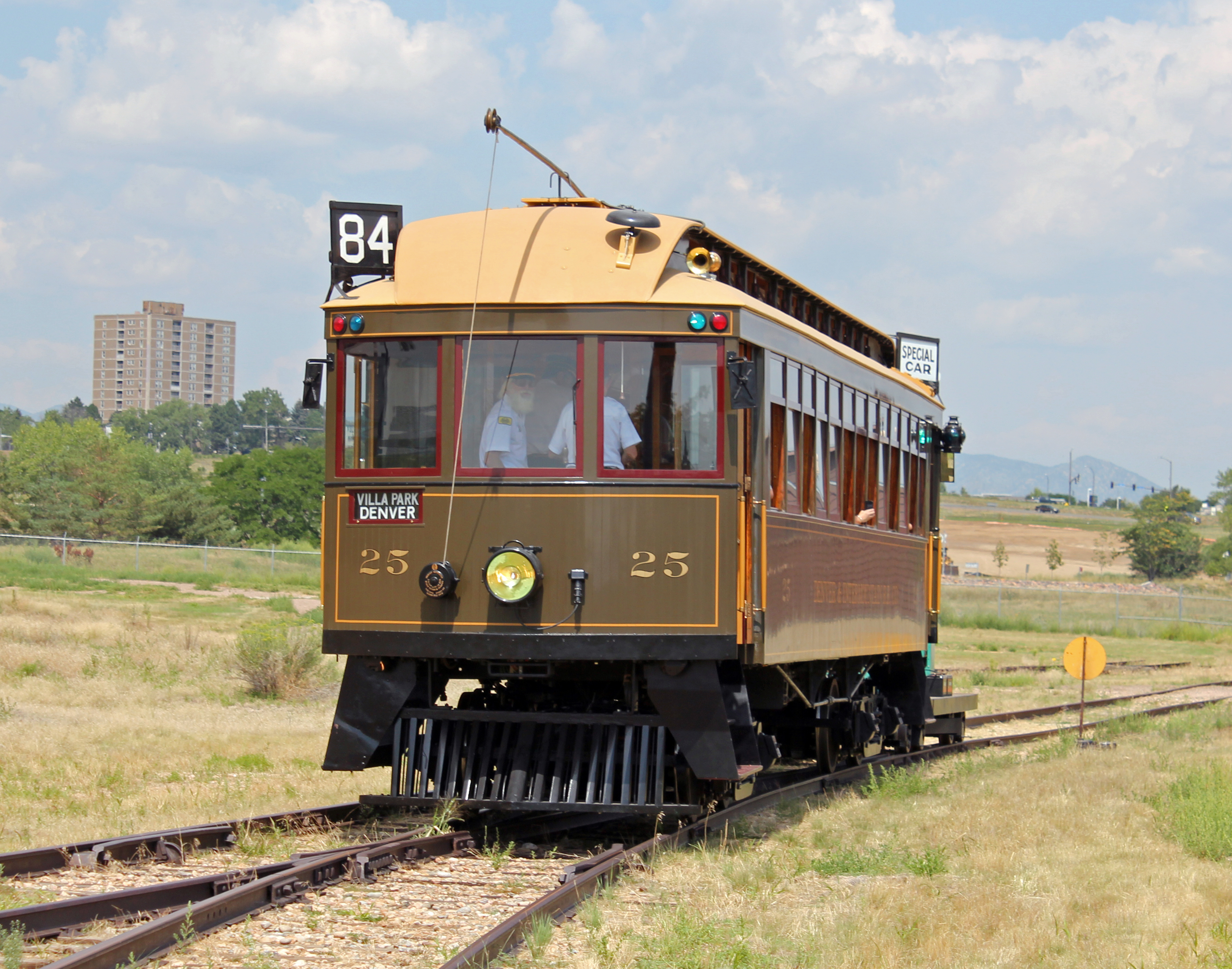
- Location: Denver Federal Center; West 6th Avenue & Kipling Street; Lakewood, Colorado
- Built: 1911
- Built by: Woeber Car Company
- NRHP reference No.: 11001016
- Added to NRHP: January 12, 2012

Denver and Intermountain Number 25 is an interurban car built by the Woeber Car Company in Denver. It entered service in 1911 and was retired in 1950 with the end of streetcar operations in Denver. The car was purchased by the Rocky Mountain Railroad Club for $150 ($2007 adjusted for inflation) and continued to be used for excursions until 1953. After being briefly stored in Golden, it was moved to the Colorado Railroad Museum and stored outdoors. The Platte Valley Trolley intended to use the car for its heritage trolley service, but eventually chose another vehicle after No. 25 was moved to Denver Federal Center. Despite this, a restoration began in 1988. In 2010, ownership of the car was transferred to the West Corridor Historical Rail Cooperative, an agency supported by the Platte Valley Trolley and the City of Lakewood. It was listed on the National Register of Historic Places on January 12, 2012, being notable as the only known surviving standard gauge Woeber-built car of its type. Lakewood periodically hosts public open house visits with short rides.

== See also ==
- Denver and Interurban Railroad
- Denver Tramway
