= Timnath, Colorado =

Town in Colorado, United States

- Town
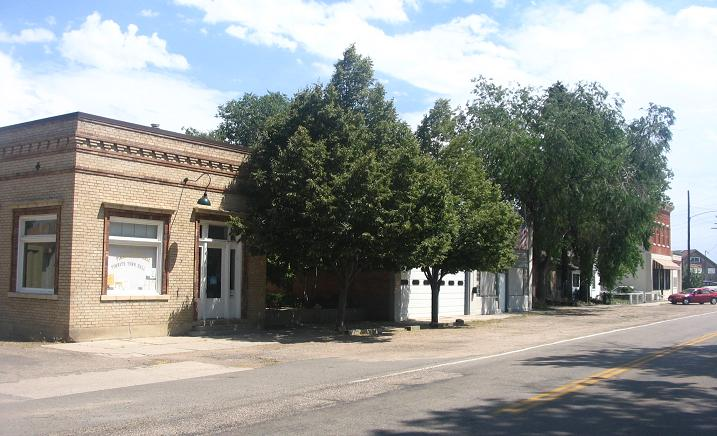
- "Old Town Timnath" in 2005. Structures, from left to right (north to south) are the town hall, fire station, and an empty storefront.

- Location of Timnath, Colorado
- Coordinates: 40.533209°N 104.964501°W
- Country: United States
- State: Colorado
- County: Larimer
- Settled: 1869
- Established: 1882
- Incorporated: July 6, 1920
- Named after: Biblical city of Timnath

Government
  - Type: Mayor–council
  - Mayor: Robert Axmacher
  - Mayor Pro-Tem: Luke Wagner
  - Councilmembers: Lisa Laake; Jeramie Holt; Bill Jenkins

Area
  - Total: 7.349 sq mi (19.034 km^{2})
  - Land: 7.312 sq mi (18.938 km^{2})
  - Water: 0.037 sq mi (0.095 km^{2}) 0.5%
- Elevation: 4,869 ft (1,484 m)

Population (2020)
  - Total: 6,487
  - Estimate (2025): 11,600
  - Density: 1,483.6/sq mi (572.81/km^{2})
- Time zone: UTC–7 (Mountain (MST))
  - Summer (DST): UTC–6 (MDT)
- ZIP Code: 80547
- Area code: 970
- FIPS code: 08-77510
- GNIS feature ID: 0180510
- Sales tax: 6.7%
- Website: timnath.org

The Town of Timnath is a statutory town located in Larimer County, Colorado, United States. Founded in 1882, Timnath is a small agriculture community located southeast of Fort Collins, Colorado, approximately one-half mile east of the Harmony Road/Interstate 25 interchange, on a small bluff east of the Cache la Poudre River. The surrounding farmlands have been used primarily for potatoes, alfalfa, sugar beets, and cattle. Although the town has remained virtually unchanged in recent decades, the encroaching growth of both Fort Collins to the west and Windsor to the south have placed the town in an area considered favorable to development. The population was 6,487 at the 2020 census, and was estimated to be 11,600 in 2025. Timnath has been one of the fastest-growing communities in Colorado since 2020.

== Description ==
Other structures lining Main Street (a section of County Road 5) include elementary school (in the Poudre School District), a one-story modern post-office, and several other historic buildings. Most residences are single-family homes. There is another elementary school (Bethke Elementary) 2.8 miles away from the one lining Main Street.

== History ==
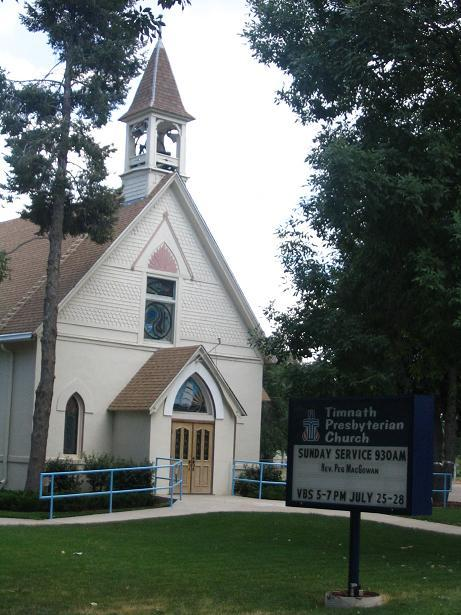
Timnath Presbyterian Church, a congregation of the Presbyterian Church.

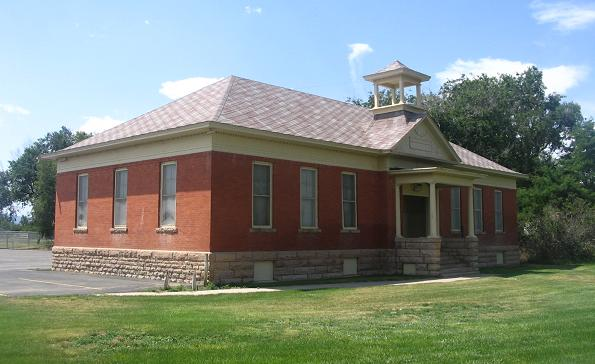
The 1900 school building, now a secondary building to Timnath Elementary School.

The area was first homesteaded by settlers in 1860. The Sherwood Station site, an Overland Trail stop, opened in 1860 on the Sherwood Ranch. The first schoolhouse was constructed that year, approximately one-half mile west of the current town, and was named "Fairview". By 1880, the community had outgrown the schoolhouse, and new "Fairview" school was built just north of the current town. The school also served as an early meeting place for the Presbyterian Church. The turning point in the early history of the community was in 1882, with the arrival of the Greeley, Salt Lake and Pacific Railroad (controlled by the Union Pacific) linking Greeley and Fort Collins. The following year, the Presbyterian Church, petitioned by local residents, sent a missionary to found a congregation. The current structure along Main Street dates from that year.

A post office was established in 1884, headed by Reverend Charles A. Taylor, the local Presbyterian minister. When the post office was formed, Taylor bestowed the current name of the town from the 14th chapter of the Book of Judges, as the place where Samson went to obtain a Philistine wife. In 1900 the second school became outdated and a new one was built, dropping the name "Fairview" permanently. This structure currently stands as an out-building to the current elementary school. A larger school was built in 1918 (which burned in 1935 and was rebuilt the following year). The school district was consolidated with that of Fort Collins in 1960.

During World War II, the Empire of Japan launched Fu-Go balloon bombs that floated across the Pacific to the U.S. One of these bombs dropped and exploded in a field in Timnath.

== Geography ==
According to the United States Census Bureau, the city has a total area of 7.349 square miles (19.03 km^{2}), of which 7.312 square miles (18.94 km^{2}) is land and 0.037 square miles (0.096 km^{2}) (0.5%) is water.

The historical downtown lies along County Road Five, which runs north–south parallel to Interstate 25 half a mile to the east. Since the 2000 census, the town of Timnath has annexed several square miles of land to the east and southeast; the town has experienced significant commercial development along the east–west corridor of County Road 38 (Harmony Road). The majority of the six mile (north-south) by three mile (east-west) block of land that lies within Timnath's growth management area is low-density residential or agricultural, and is designated to remain so, with open space and parkland filling the remainder of the area, particularly near the Poudre River and Timnath Reservoir.

== Government ==
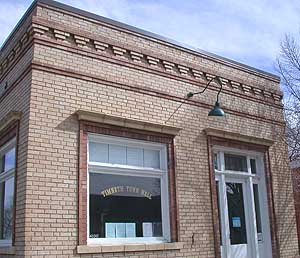
The Timnath Town Hall

Timnath is a home rule municipality with a council–manager form of government; the town adopted its home rule charter in 2006. It is governed by a Town Council of five elected officials—one mayor and four council members. All five are elected at large, meaning that they are elected by voters throughout the town rather than representing individual council districts, and they serve staggered four-year terms.

Council meetings are open, public meetings where the Council makes town decisions and creates local laws and policies. The Council holds regular meetings on the second and fourth Tuesday of each month at 6 p.m. at the Timnath Town Center, 4750 Signal Tree Drive.

The Town Council appoints the Town Manager, who serves at the pleasure of the Council and is responsible for the administration and daily operations of the town, including hiring and supervising town staff.

Police services are provided by the Timnath Police Department, with dispatch and regional support from the Larimer County Sheriff's Office. Fire protection and emergency medical services are provided by the Poudre Fire Authority, whose Station 8 serves the town.

== Demographics ==
Historical population
Census	Pop.	Note	%±
1930	169		—
1940	147		−13.0%
1950	177		20.4%
1960	150		−15.3%
1970	177		18.0%
1980	185		4.5%
1990	190		2.7%
2000	223		17.4%
2010	625		180.3%
2020	6,487		937.9%
2025 (est.)	11,600	▲	78.8%
U.S. Decennial Census; 2020 Census

=== 2020 census ===
As of the 2020 census, Timnath had a population of 6,487. The population density was 988.1 inhabitants per square mile (381.5/km^{2}). The median age was 35.6 years. 34.5% of residents were under the age of 18, 6.8% were under 5 years of age, and 9.2% were 65 years of age or older. For every 100 females there were 99.1 males, and for every 100 females age 18 and over there were 96.8 males age 18 and over.

77.7% of residents lived in urban areas, while 22.3% lived in rural areas.

There were 2,002 households and 1,814 families residing in the town. Of all households, 57.2% had children under the age of 18 living in them, 81.3% were married-couple households, 6.0% were households with a male householder and no spouse or partner present, and 9.2% were households with a female householder and no spouse or partner present. About 6.0% of all households were made up of individuals and 1.9% had someone living alone who was 65 years of age or older.

There were 2,213 housing units, of which 9.5% were vacant. The homeowner vacancy rate was 5.5% and the rental vacancy rate was 0.0%.

Timnath Racial Composition
Race	Number	Percent
White (NH)	5,271	81.3%
Black or African American (NH)	39	0.6%
Native American or Alaska Native (NH)	12	0.2%
Asian (NH)	299	4.6%
Pacific Islander (NH)	1	0.0%
Some Other Race (NH)	38	0.6%
Mixed/Multi-Racial (NH)	288	4.4%
Hispanic or Latino	539	8.3%
Total	6,487	100.00%

=== 2010 census ===
As of the 2010 census, there were 625 people, 214 households, and 179 families residing in the town. The population density was 129.4 inhabitants per square mile (50.0/km^{2}). There were 243 housing units. The racial makeup of the town was 94.4% White, 0.6% African American, 0.0% Native American, 1.1% Asian, 0.3% Pacific Islander, 1.4% from other races, and 2.1% from two or more races. 6.1% of the population were Hispanic or Latino of any race.

There were 214 households, out of which 46.7% had children under the age of 18 living with them, 72.0% were married couples living together, 7.9% had a female householder with no husband present, 3.7% had a male householder with no wife present, and 16.4% were non-families. 14.0% of all households were made up of individuals, and 1.4% had someone living alone who was 65 years of age or older. The average household size was 2.92 and the average family size was 3.23.

In the town, the population was spread out, with 32.3% under the age of 18, 5.6% from 18 to 24, 27.7% from 25 to 44, 27.0% from 45 to 64, and 7.4% who were 65 years of age or older. The median age was 35.4 years. For every 100 females, there were 98.4 males.

=== Income and poverty ===
In the 2009–2013 American Community Survey, the median income for a household in the town was $113,144, and the median income for a family was $114,318. The per capita income for the town was $40,889. 1.5% of the population and 1.1% of families were below the poverty line. 1.0% of those under the age of 18 and 1.7% of those 65 and older were living below the poverty line.

=== Demographic estimates ===
Timnath has experienced significant population growth in recent years. Between the 2020 census and 2022 the town's population rose by about 40%, the second-largest increase of any municipality in Colorado over that period. The Census Bureau estimated the town's population at 11,600 as of July 1, 2025.

== Notable people ==
- Jean Bethke Elshtain, political philosopher
