= Confluence Park =

Park in Denver, Colorado, United States

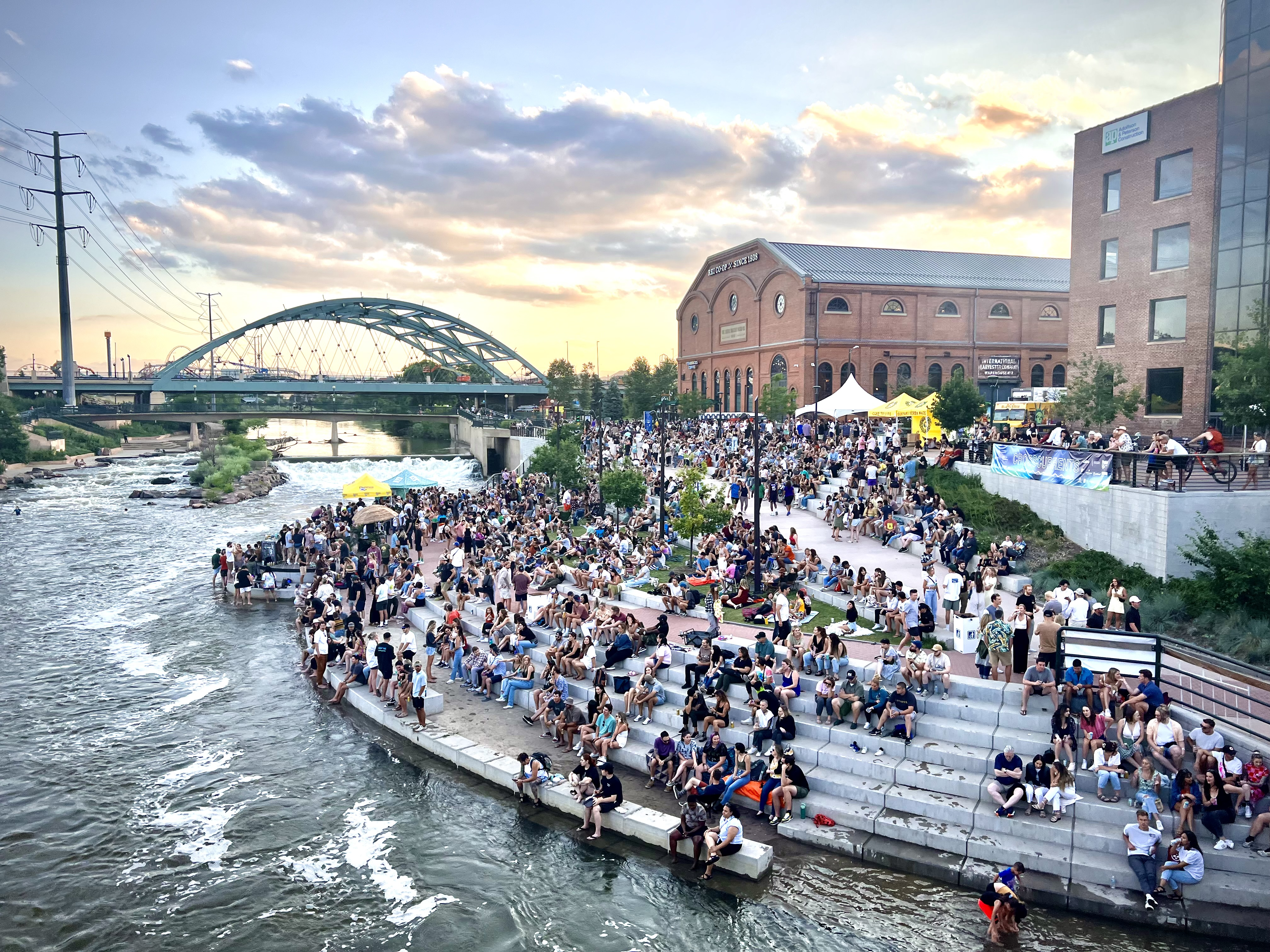
- Confluence of the South Platte and Cherry Creek near downtown Denver
- Interactive map of Confluence Park
- Type: Urban Park
- Location: Denver, Colorado
- Coordinates: 39.752997°N 105.011766°W
- Operator: City of Denver
- Open: Year round

Confluence Park is an urban park encompassing the confluence of Cherry Creek and the South Platte River in Denver's Lower Downtown (LoDo), a bustling district of 19th-century brick warehouses and storefronts that has been redeveloped since the late 1980s.

== Current usage ==
The park includes concrete trails often filled with walkers, runners, and bikers. Some grassy areas, river overlooks, and park benches are also available. Two pedestrian bridges cross the South Platte River and Cherry Creek at Confluence Park. The eastern edge of the South Platte in Confluence Park has been transformed into a kayak run, immediately across from R.E.I.'s (Recreational Equipment Inc.) Colorado flagship store. The park is adjacent to a number of new up-scale townhouses, apartments, and loft developments, another park bordering the South Platte downstream, train tracks, and Denver's skatepark.

The Platte Valley Trolley originates in Confluence Park, running along the west side of the South Platte River from Memorial Day weekend through Labor Day weekend, and for all Denver Broncos home games.

== History ==
Confluence Park marks the area where William Greeneberry Russell's party began its local search for gold in May 1858. They found no gold at the confluence, but they turned up "good diggings" at the mouth of Little Dry Creek, about four miles south. The discovery was an immediate cause of the Colorado Gold Rush, and the encampment would become Denver. Part of the site previously hosted an Xcel Energy substation, which was relocated to allow for the expansion of the park.
