= Denver and Interurban Railroad =

Former interurban railway in Colorado

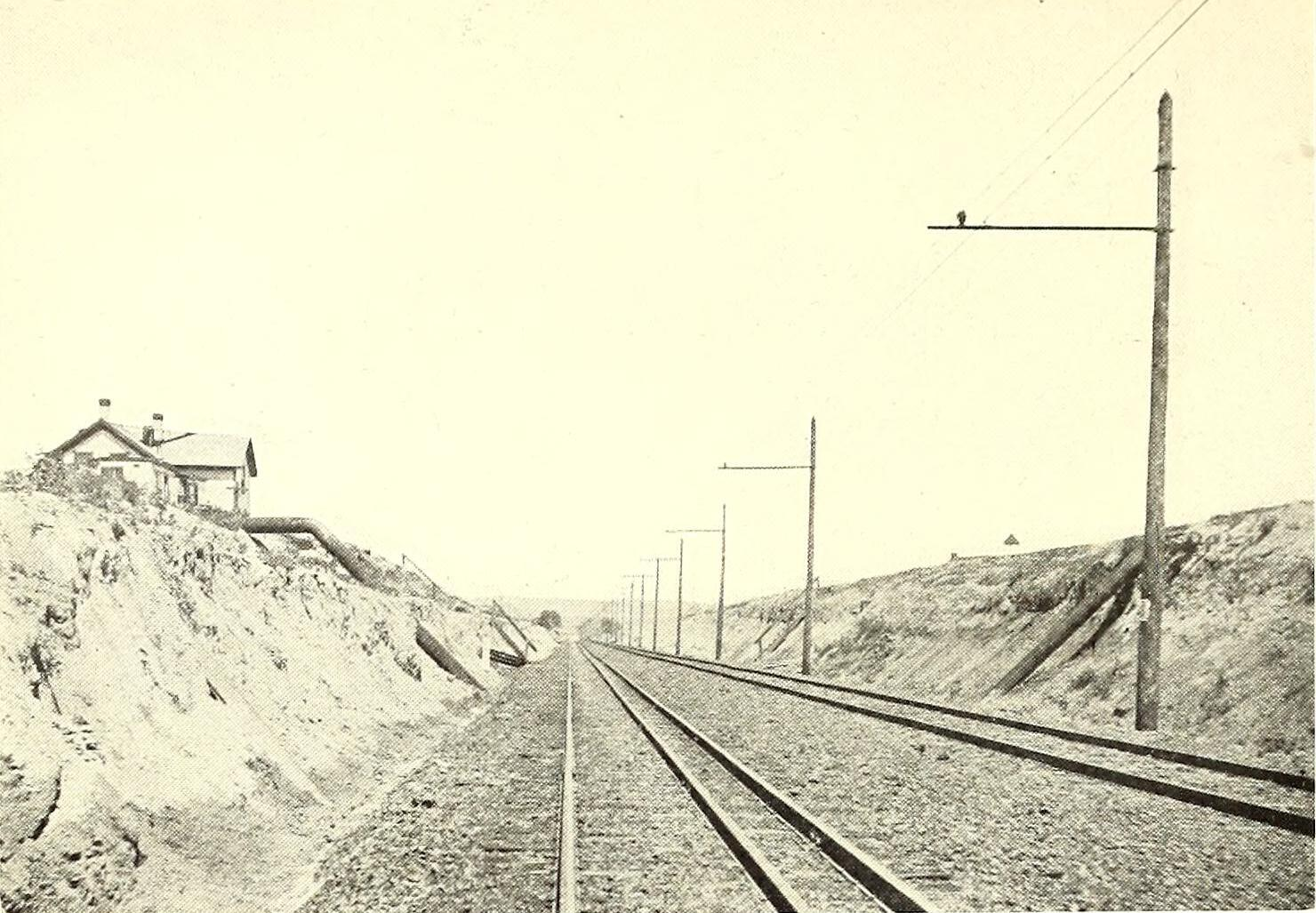
"Denver & Interurban Railroad—Electric Track and Double-gage [sic] Steam Track", Electric Railway Journal 1909

The Denver and Interurban Railroad was an interurban railway company. It was a subsidiary of the Colorado and Southern Railway with lines running between Denver and Boulder, Colorado. Service began on June 23, 1908. It employed an odd 11,000 Volt alternating current Westinghouse railway electrification system. Cars carried redundant direct current controls for operation on local streetcar tracks at its endpoints. Some trackage was dual gauged to allow narrow gauge Denver, Boulder and Western Railroad access to Denver. The company's lines in Denver terminated at the interurban loop at 17th and Arapahoe.

The company entered receivership in 1918 and were forced to divest from their operations in Fort Collins. Interurban service continued and the company would go on to exit receivership in 1921. The Burlington Northern tracks between Modern and Denver were electrified in 1922, so Interurban cars were rerouted to terminate at Denver Union Station starting on September 24, 1922. Ridership continued to drop, and the railway entered receivership again in 1926, ceasing operations for good on its Boulder line that December.

== Fort Collins streetcars ==
Under a franchise granted by the City Council of Fort Collins in 1907 for a term of twenty years to this company, an electric street trolley car system was installed in Fort Collins, the object being to build the link from Boulder to Fort Collins, and at the same time to forestall rival transportation corporations from entering the area.

The business depression of 1907 to 1909 caused the Denver and Interurban Railroad Company to suspend operations and when business conditions again became normal the automobile had entered so largely into the economic life of the community that it was no longer profitable, for private capital, to operate on a five cent fare ($1.79 in 2025 adjusted for inflation). Another reason for the system showing a loss was that the rolling stock consisted of broad gauge cars, weighing about twenty four tons, which, in their operation, consumed such an enormous amount of electrical energy that the cost of operating that type of car absorbed half of the passenger revenue.

The company then sought to shorten the system and also replaced these heavy cars with the "one man, pay as you enter" type of car. These changes were made in the hope that the cost of operation might be substantially reduced, but the net result and benefit derived from the change, did not justify the means taken.

When the Federal government took over the railroads during World War I, it refused to permit the Colorado and Southern Railroad to continue the operation of the burdensome and unprofitable local street railway system in Fort Collins; this resulted in a proceeding whereby the Denver and Interurban Company passed into the hands of receivers in June 1918.

On July 10, 1918 the service of this system ceased and Fort Collins was again without any means of local transportation. The city would go on to purchase all of the properties of the Denver and Interurban Company, excepting its rolling stock, from the receivers of the company, which would form the basis of the Fort Collins Municipal Railway.

== See also ==
- Denver and Intermountain Railroad
- Denver Tramway
