= Southern San Luis Valley Railroad =

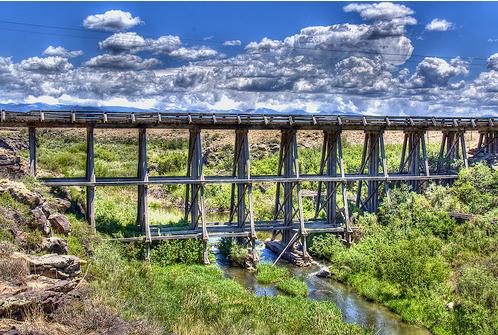
Rattlesnake Trestle near Blanca, Colorado

The Southern San Luis Valley Railroad is a fallen flag shortline railroad that was located in Southern Colorado. Best known in its final years of operation, it served a connection with the Denver and Rio Grande Western Railroad at Blanca, Colorado. The diminutive railroad in its final form was approximately 1.53 miles (2.46 km) in length. During its life freight traffic included farm produce, fertilizer and volcanic scoria (lava rock). The railroad, as it was originally built, was 31 miles (50 km) long and besides freight it operated passenger service between Blanca and Jaroso, Colorado, until 1946. The railroad formally ceased all operations December 31, 1996.

== History ==
The original rail line was incorporated July 3, 1909, as the San Luis Southern Railroad. It was a subsidiary of the Costilla Estates Development Company, whose purpose was to develop farm land in Colorado's San Luis Valley. The railroad's business model was to serve the developing towns and farms set up by the Costilla Estates Development Company, whose business model was dependent on reservoirs it had built filling up with water for irrigation. The reservoirs have never filled up, owing to inadequate rainfall to fill them. Consequently, Costilla Estates never prospered, nor did the San Luis Southern Railroad. On January 6, 1928, the railroad was purchased out of bankruptcy by Charles Boettcher. He reorganized the line on December 13, 1928, as the San Luis Valley Southern Railway. Under Boettcher's leadership, the railroad continued to struggle and its fortunes did not improve substantially.

On January 24, 1949, the Boettcher/McLean estates filed a petition before the Interstate Commerce Commission (ICC) to abandon the railroad. The abandonment was hotly contested by interests in the San Luis Valley. As the interested parties were fighting over the abandonment, San Luis Valley businessmen S. Yorimoto and W.W. McClintock were making arrangements to purchase the railroad, which happened two weeks before the abandonment hearing were scheduled. Between 1949 and 1954 there were various machinations and financial arrangements made to keep the railroad afloat. On September 19, 1952, McClintock filed for abandonment of the railroad, however the ICC only granted a partial abandonment on September 24, 1953. McClintock continued to operate the railroad after this ICC decision.

McClintock and another San Luis Valley businessman George Oringdulf, decided to reorganize the line and tied up all the railroad's loose ends by purchasing all stock in the company. On December 11, 1953, a new company was organized under Colorado law, and on October 22, 1954, it was granted a Colorado State Corporate Charter under the name Southern San Luis Valley Railroad (SSLV).

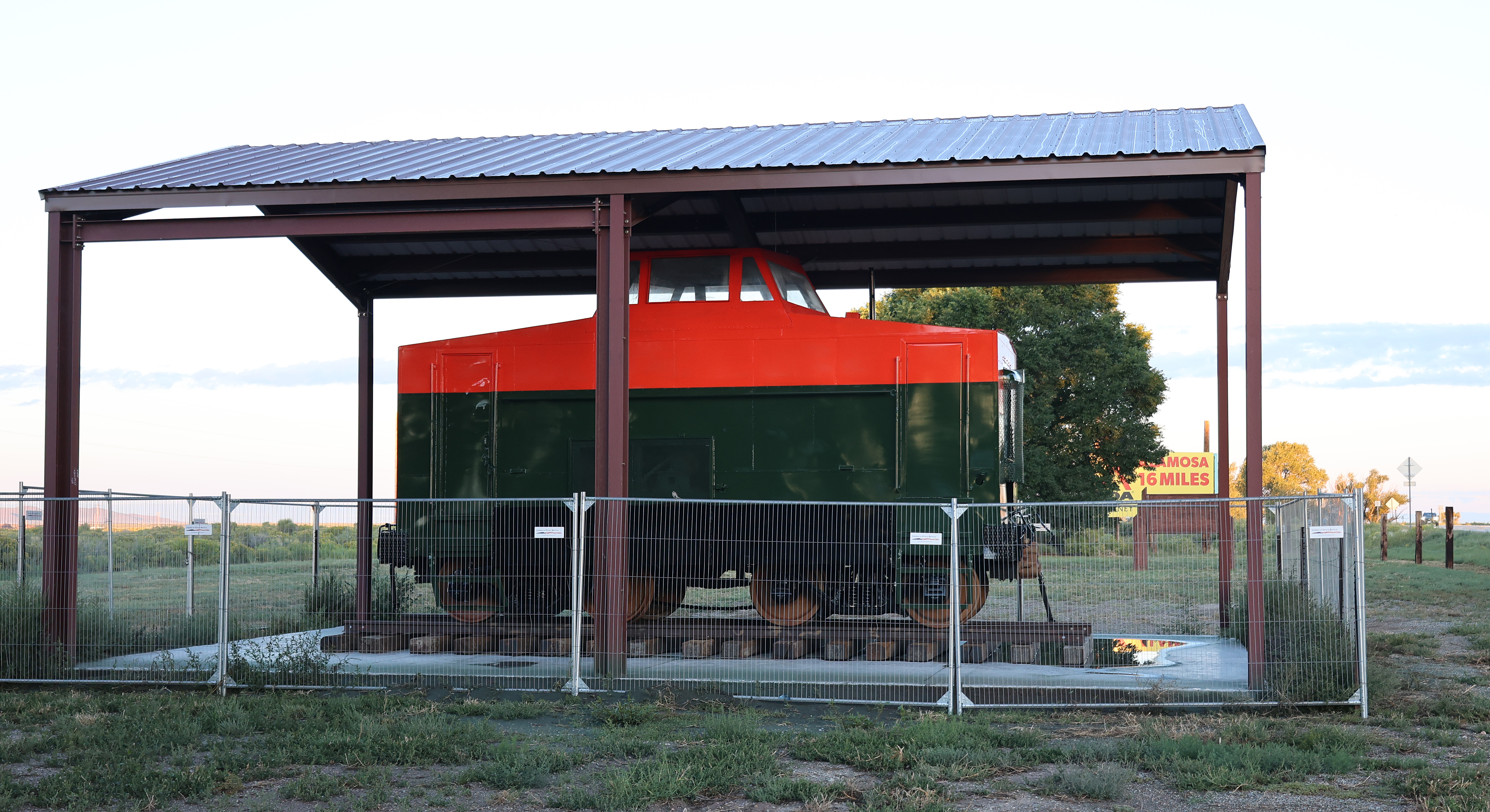
The SSLV D-500 in 2024

McClintock and Oringdulph knew their two steam locomotives, #105 and #106, both Consolidation types, purchased from the Denver and Rio Grande Western Railroad were too costly to maintain. They took the D&RGW steam locomotive tender frame (D&RGW #964) which they had purchased in 1950 and after an abortive attempt at building a locomotive on the tender frame, a successful machine was completed in 1955. It was a strange-looking locomotive they called the D-500. It rolled on standard locomotive tender trucks which were powered by a sprocket and chain drive. Power was from an International Harvester, 1091 cubic inch, UD24 diesel engine. The power went through a Caterpillar hydraulic transmission, which in turn powered an old Euclid truck axle, which transmitted power through sprockets and chains to the axles. The odd locomotive, which resembled a caboose, was built in a cupola style for visibility and to ease the installation of the prime mover. The locomotive was built by SSLV mechanics in Mesita, Colorado. All steam trains on the SSLV ceased operating in 1957.

By that time the railroad's traffic base remained close to Blanca, with little traffic originating in Jaroso. On March 15, 1958, the 29 miles of track from McClintock to Jaroso was closed and the rail was sold to the Climax Molybdenum Company. What was left of the SSLV was roughly a 2.5-mile (4.0 km) stretch south from Blanca. The railroad served Colorado Aggregates Company at McClintock and the Mizokami lettuce packing plant just north of the McClintock wye track. This became the status quo for the railroad until the closing of the Mizokami lettuce plant in the late 1970s and then the subsequent sale of the SSLV to the Hecla Mining Company.

In 1977 the SSLV purchased a second locomotive, a Plymouth ML8 (builder #4161) purchased from Utah Power and Light Company. The gasoline engine in the locomotive was defective and was removed in 1980 so a Caterpillar diesel engine could be installed in its place. The swap was never completed, however, and the locomotive sits derelict without an engine.

The railroad owned various locomotives over the years. They include: #100 and #101 both Brooks 4-6-0 locomotives, bought used From Lake Shore and Michigan Southern Railway; #102 (2-6-0) built by Baldwin, bought new by the San Luis Southern; #103(DRGW 657), #104(DRGW 633), #105(DRGW 688), and #106(DRGW 683), all C-28's (2-8-0) purchased from the Denver and Rio Grande Western Railroad. The railroad also operated a motorcar, built by Winter-Weiss in 1924, that was originally numbered the M-3, then renumbered the M300. It sits derelict at the Oklahoma Railway Museum in Oklahoma City. Another piece of SSLV history, steam engine #106, which was restored to its original D&RGW number is on display at the Colorado Railroad Museum.

The ICC gave the railroad permission to remove rail in order to maintain operations in 1953, so the railroad was cut back to 1.53 miles from 2 1/2 miles in 1959. Some of the remaining track was still in place in 2009. Permian Basin Railroad's San Luis and Rio Grande Railroad purchased what was left in 2007, including the derelict D-500 and Plymouth ML8. In 2008, the SLRG started rebuilding portions of the SSLV trackage for freight car storage and railcar dismantling operations.

== Notes ==
=== References ===
- Colorado Secretary of State (1954). Articles of Incorporation Southern San Luis valley Railroad Company. Denver, CO: Colorado Secretary of State.
- Griswold, Phelps R. (1980). Colorado's Loneliest Railroad. Denver, CO: Pruett Publishing Company.
- LeMassena, Robert A. (1974). Rio Grande...to the Pacific!. Denver, CO: Sundance Publications.
- Lewis, Edward A. (1996). George Drury (ed.). American Shortline Railway Guide. Railroad Reference Series. Vol. 17 (5th ed.). Waukesha, WI: Kalmbach Publishing.
- Railroad Retirement Board (2001). Employer Status Southern San Luis Valley Railroad. Washington, DC: Railroad Retirement Board.
