= Denver Trolley =

Heritage streetcar line in Denver, Colorado

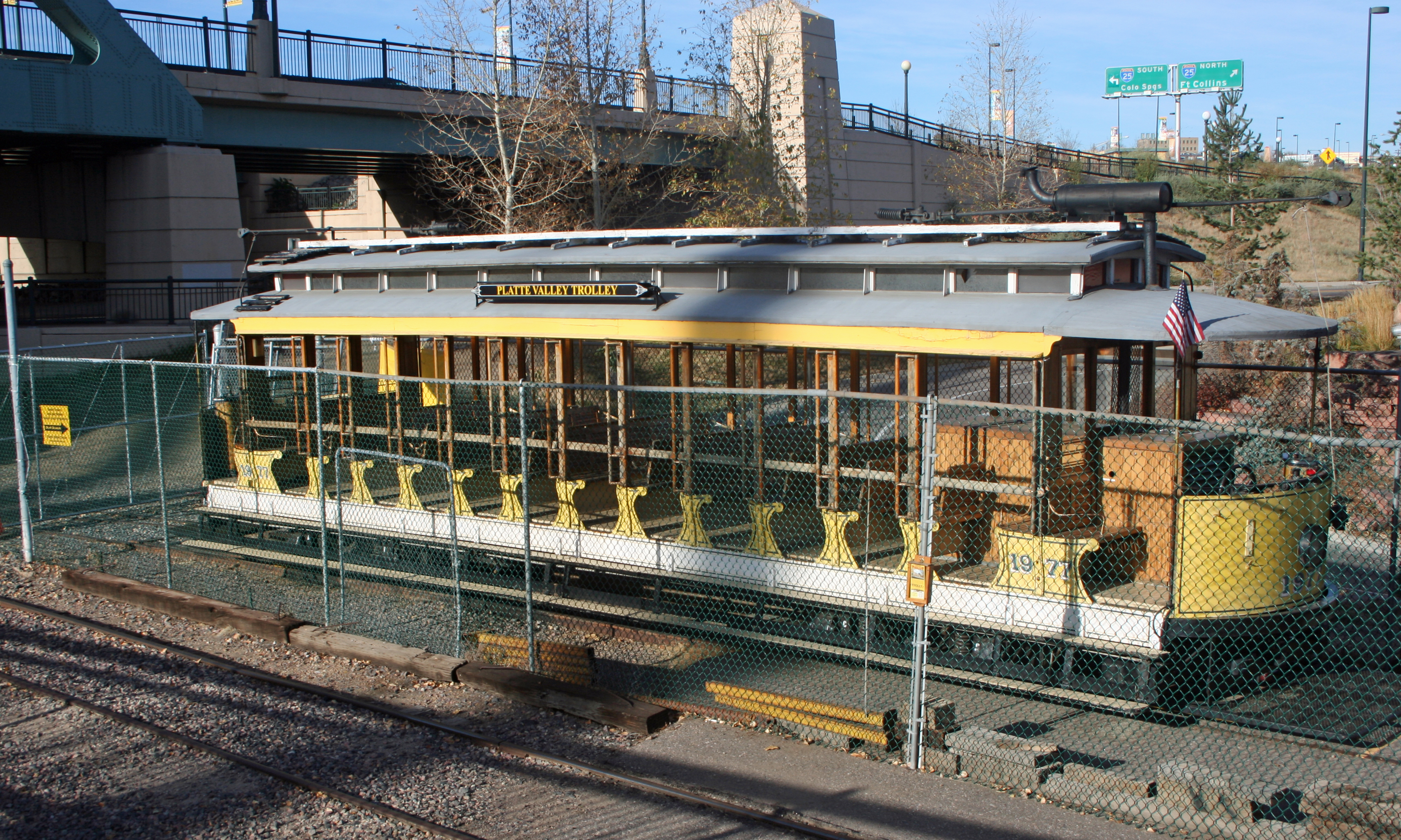
- The trolley car in its parking place in Denver

Overview
- Other name(s): Platte Valley Trolley (1989–2016)
- Locale: Denver

Service
- Type: Heritage streetcar
- Operator(s): Denver Tramway Heritage Society

History
- Opened: July 1, 1989

Technical
- Line length: 1.2 miles
- Track gauge: 4 ft 8 1/2 in (1,435 mm)
- Electrification: None (Diesel electric)

The Denver Trolley, formerly known as the Platte Valley Trolley, is a heritage streetcar line in Denver, Colorado, operated by the Denver Tramway Heritage Society. It began service on July 1, 1989.

== Route and operation ==
The trolley line originates in Confluence Park, the historic location where the city of Denver was founded, at the confluence of the South Platte River and Cherry Creek River. The trolley is located at approximately 1400 Platte Street in Denver, behind REI's flagship store. Visitors can reach the trolley from Platte Street or from 15th Street in downtown Denver. The line lacks overhead trolley wires, and the streetcar serving it is equipped with diesel-electric power.

In 2022, the trolley operated Saturdays and Sundays from May 28 through August 14, with the first run leaving Confluence Park at 10:00 AM and the last run of the day leaving at 1:30 PM. Tickets were priced at $7 for adults and $3 for children for a round trip with on/off privileges, available for purchase from the trolley operating crew at any of the trolley's stops (REI/Confluence Park, Downtown Aquarium, or Children's Museum of Denver).

The trolley also operates a football fans' shuttle between Confluence Park and Empower Field at Mile High for Denver Broncos home games. Fare is $10 round trip, or $7 one way.

The line runs south (upriver) on the west side of the Platte River to Lakewood Gulch. Prior to 2007, the line continued west along Lakewood Gulch (approximately West 13th Avenue) and ran on the old interurban shortline tracks of the Denver and Intermountain Railroad to Sheridan Boulevard. The line currently stops near where RTD built their new west corridor of the FasTracks light rail project, which opened on April 26, 2013.

The line passes a number of historic and tourist attractions, including the Children's Museum, the Downtown Aquarium, Empower Field at Mile High (home of the Denver Broncos) and Elitch Gardens. Views of the Denver skyline are visible all through the 25-minute narrated historical tour.

The Denver Trolley recalls the open car streetcars of an earlier era in Denver, which at one point in the history of Denver was the primary means of transportation throughout the city. In circa 1920, there were a group of six "Seeing Denver" streetcars that traversed the rails. A number of buildings in Denver, though currently re-purposed, were once key structures in the trolley system, and many retain their original signage. Today, in addition to regular operations, the Denver Trolley is available for charters and special tours. More information can be found at the Denver Trolley website.

== Rolling stock ==
The Denver Trolley operates a 1986 replica of a 1903 Brill open streetcar. The frame and steel components of the car used in the construction are from a 1924 Melbourne, Australia streetcar. Numbered 1977, the car was made by the Gomaco Trolley Company in Ida Grove, Iowa. An on-board Cummins 6BT diesel electric generator provides the 600 volts d.c. for the four Metropolitan-Vickers traction motors and other accessories.

== See also ==
- List of Colorado historic railroads
