= Gilpin Railroad =

Railroad in Colorado, United States

Gilpin Tramway
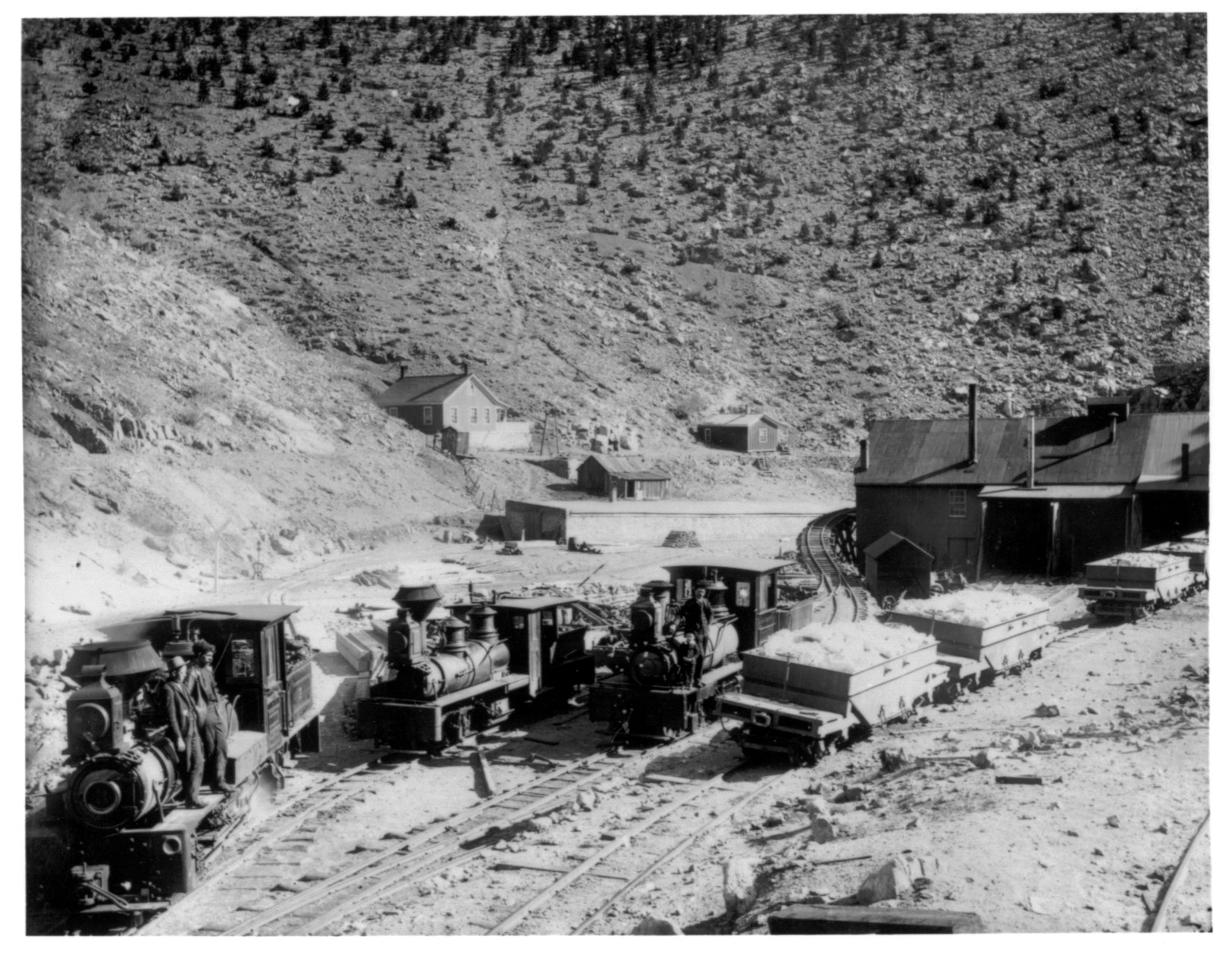
- The Gilpin Tramway locomotives and enginehouse

Overview
- Locale: Gilpin County, Colorado
- Dates of operation: 1887–1917

Technical
- Track gauge: 2 ft (610 mm)
- Length: 15 1/2 miles (24.9 km)

The Gilpin Railroad, earlier the Gilpin Tramway Company, was a 2 ft (610 mm) narrow gauge railway in Gilpin County, Colorado, in operation from 1887 to 1917.

== Gold extraction ==
In April 1859, John H. Gregory discovered alluvial gold in Clear Creek, near Golden, Colorado. The gold was concentrated in the north branch of Clear Creek, in what is now called Gregory Gulch above Blackhawk. News of the discovery spread, and by September, 900 prospectors had arrived, living in log shanties and tents. By the summer of 1860, sixty ore mills and thirty arrastras were in operation and the population had risen to 15,000. Mining camps, including Black Hawk, Central City, Nevadaville, Russell Gulch and Apex were formed.

But by the mid-1860s, the easily-accessible alluvial gold deposit had been exhausted. A smelter was set up in Black Hawk in 1865, to allow gold to be extracted from hard rock ore. In 1870, the 3 ft (914 mm) narrow gauge Colorado Central Railroad was formed to provide transportation to this remote region. Construction of the railroad started in September 1871, and the first train arrived at Black Hawk on December 15, 1873. In 1878, a four-mile long switchback extension was built from Black Hawk to Central City, with the first train arriving on May 21, 1878.

== Gilpin Tramway Company ==
The problem still remained on how to economically get the gold bearing quartz ore down to the mills of Central City and Black Hawk. It was a dangerous, slow and expensive process to bring the ore down in horse-drawn wagons. In Summer 1886 five mining men met to solve the problem. The solution was the Gilpin Tramway Company, formed on July 29 in Central City by Henry C. Bolsinger, Bradford H. Locke, Robert A. Campbell, Andrew W. Rogers and Henry J. Hawley. The purpose of the company was to build a 2 ft (610 mm) narrow gauge railroad to transport ore from the mines above Black Hawk to the mills.

=== Construction of the tramway ===
Grading was started in May 1887. A frame barn was purchased above Black Hawk as an engine house. The first rails were laid on July 1, 1887. Shay locomotive #1 arrived on August 26, with its first run on September 1. Trackage worked its way back down Clear Creek climbing the side of the hill and climbing up into Gregory Gulch. The maximum grade was six percent with several curves having a 50-foot (15 m) radius. The trackage continued on above Central City (there was an excursion train for Central City residents from where the tram crossed Eureka Gulch to Black Hawk on September 29, 1887). From there the trackage continued up to Nevadaville, Quartz Hill and Russel Gulch.

Much of the altitude gained by the Gilpin was done by the use of switchbacks. The Tram had more switchbacks than any other American railroad. At one point, seven switchbacks were used to reach a single mine.

=== Opposition ===
The railroad was not without its opponents. The Gilpin was in direct competition to the various teamster outfits. An agreement had been made with the Colorado Central to lay a third rail through Black Hawk (creating a dual gauge track) to allow the Gilpin to reach its various mills and smelters. Mayor William Fick, associated with many of the teamsters, fought to stop the Gilpin from coming through 'his' town. The third rail was laid after various legal actions starting in December 1887. But that was not the end of it, in April 1888, the Mayor accompanied by the marshal ordered laborers to stop laying the third rail and to start removing trackage that had already been laid. Fick declared that the tram would throw teamsters out of work, a great calamity for the city. But with a payment from the Gilpin of $450 to the city, the Mayor was advised to quit his losing fight, and none of the trackage was removed.

=== Tourism ===
Ore and supplies were not the only cargo carried on the Gilpin. On May 23, 1888, the tram received six new excursion passenger cars. As with many other railroads in the west, tourist traffic created a good supplement to the railroads income. Excursions occurred throughout each summer. A round trip from Black Hawk with lunch was 75 cents. A combined trip on the Colorado Central from Denver was $2.40.

=== Extensions ===
Throughout 1888, track was extended to mines and mills leading to 15 1/2 miles (24.9 km) of track by winter of that year. Once winter arrived, a new and interesting problem arrived as well. Ore comes from wet ground, and in the winter, it has a tendency to freeze solid in the cars before delivery to the mills. The tram solved this problem with a unique solution. A warming house was built near the engine house with tracks running its entire length. Steam pipes and stoves warmed the building to a high of 120 °F (49 °C), thus keeping the ore warm and dry.

=== Sale to the Colorado and Southern ===
Traffic continued to grow throughout the 1890s, with three Shays taking up the load. Accidents did happen on occasion with engines jumping the track and rolling over. By 1900, new Shays were replacing the old ones.

In January 1899, the Colorado Central (then owned by the bankrupt Union Pacific Railroad) was taken over by the Colorado and Southern (C&S). The Gilpin had been showing a nice profit in the early 1900s so by 1905, the C&S was looking at the Gilpin as a likely acquisition. On June 27, 1906, the Gilpin was sold to the Colorado and Southern.

=== Closure of the tramway ===
1910 saw the Gilpin at its greatest length of 26.46 miles (42.58 km) including spurs and sidings. But unfortunately, the C&S bought the Gilpin at the height of its profitability. The profit margins on mining gold was dropping both due to increased cost to extract the gold, and fixed prices in the gold market due to government. As such, traffic was dropping. Soon the Gilpin was running in the red. The last train ran on January 17, 1917. The railroad was sold for scrap in June 1917.

== Locomotives ==
Number	Builder	Type	Date	Works number	Notes
1	Lima Locomotive Works	10-ton Shay	August 1887	181	sold Silver City, Pinos Altos and Mogollon Railroad #1 1905
2	Lima Locomotive Works	12-ton Shay	February 1888	199	sold Silver City, Pinos Altos and Mogollon Railroad #2 1905
3	Lima Locomotive Works	15-ton Shay	December 1889	264	scrapped 1938
4	Lima Locomotive Works	17-ton Shay	January 1900	594	scrapped 1938
5	Lima Locomotive Works	18-ton Shay	April 1902	696	scrapped 1938

== Cars ==
Number	Builder	Type	Date	Length	Notes
1-5		flatcars	1888	17 ft (5.2 m)	#3 rebuilt to coal car #14
6-13		coal cars	1888	17 ft	
14-17		coal cars		17 ft	
18-37	Lima Locomotive Works	ore cars	1887	17 ft 7 in (5.36 m)	originally 1/2 cord (1.8 m^{3}) capacity rebuilt to 3/4 cord (2.7 m^{3}) capacity
38-87	Lima Locomotive Works	ore cars	1888	17 ft 7 in	1 cord (3.6 m^{3}) capacity
88-155	Lima Locomotive Works	ore cars	1889	17 ft 7 in	1 cord (3.6 m^{3}) capacity
300	Gilpin	water car		23 ft (7.0 m)	2,200 US gallons (8,300 L; 1,800 imp gal) capacity
1st #400	Gilpin	caboose	1904	13 ft 2 in (4.01 m)	destroyed 1912
2nd #400	Colorado and Southern Railway	caboose	1912	14 ft 2 in (4.32 m)	
401	Colorado and Southern Railway	caboose	1913	14 ft 2 in	
500-505		excursion cars	1888	21 ft (6.4 m)	one rebuilt to flatcar 2nd #4; one rebuilt to rail & boiler car #01 in 1906; one used as parts for caboose #401 in 1913; last one (#500) renumbered #1 in 1915
