= Denver Rock Island Railroad =

American Class III terminal railroad

Overview
- Headquarters: Commerce City, Colorado
- Reporting mark: DRIR
- Locale: Adams County and Denver, Colorado
- Predecessor: Chicago, Rock Island and Pacific Railroad

Technical
- Track gauge: 4 ft 8 1/2 in (1,435 mm) standard gauge

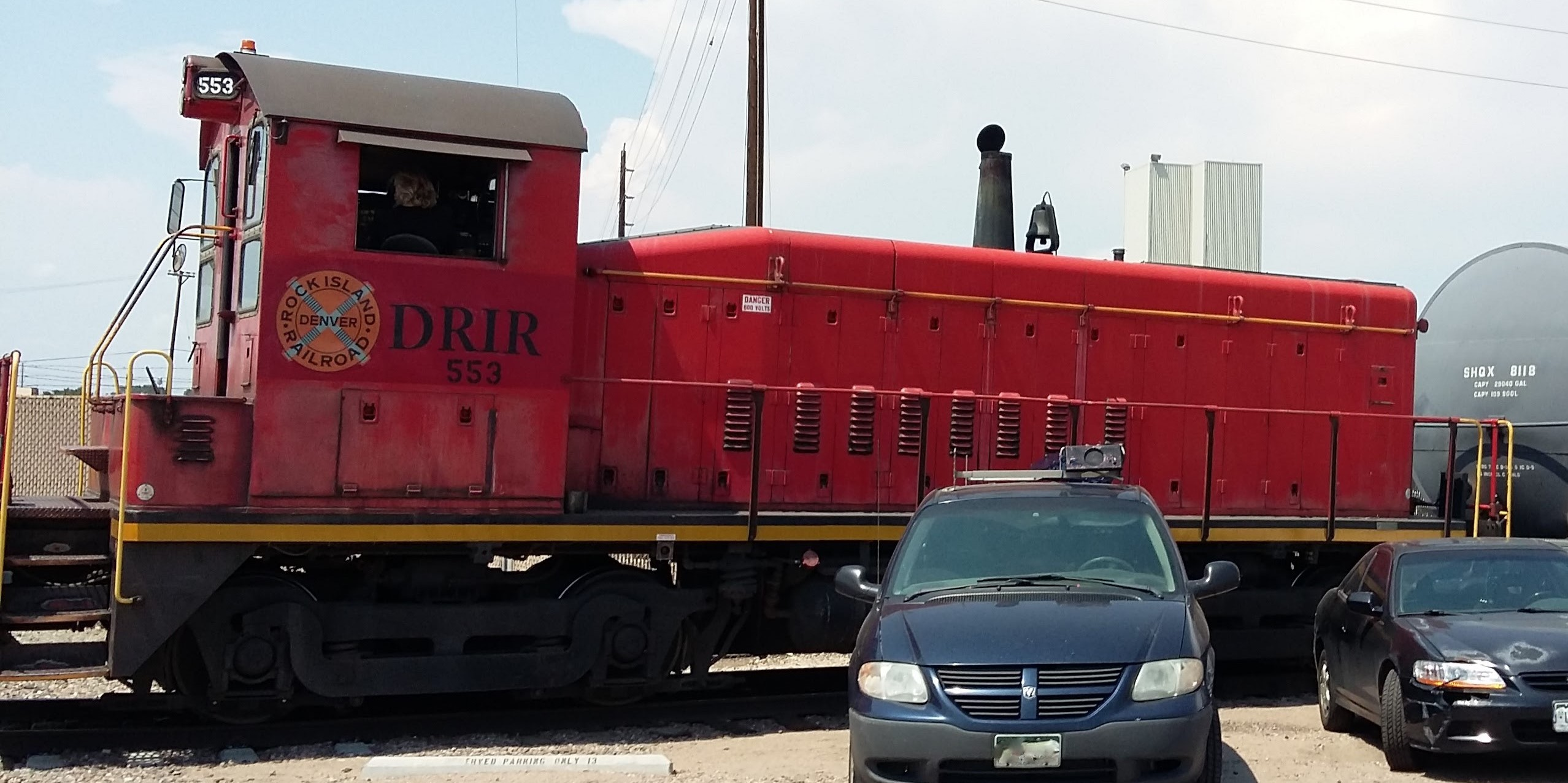
Locomotive No. 553 in 2016.

The Denver Rock Island Railroad (reporting mark DRIR), formerly known as the Denver Terminal Railroad, is a Class III terminal railroad in Denver and Commerce City, Colorado. The DRIR works around Denver's stock yards and many industries in that area.

== History ==
In June 2005, the Denver Rock Island Railroad filed with the Surface Transportation Board a verified notice of exemption under 49 CFR 1150.41 to acquire from Union Pacific Railroad and operate rail lines commonly known as the Stock Yard Lead and the North Washington Industrial Track in Denver and Adams Counties, Colorado. The Stock Yard Lead consists of track extending from a point of connection with a UP main line north of East 58th Avenue in unincorporated Adams County to a point of connection with existing DRIR trackage at or near Race Court in the City of Denver, Denver County, a distance of 5,750 feet, or 1.09 miles. The North Washington Industrial Track extends north from the UP beltline industrial lead to serve several warehouses in the lumber industry. This line contains both a wye and half a block of street running on 67th Avenue.

== Equipment ==
The DRIR has two SW1500 locomotives, two NW2 locomotives, one SW1 locomotive and one EMD GP16 locomotive.

The locomotive fleet has a varied history. DRIR 417 (NW2) is ex BN 417 and was originally SLSF (Frisco) 257. DRIR 1211 (SW1500) is ex-UPY (Union Pacific) 1211, exx-SP (Southern Pacific) 2646. Purchased from UP on April 22, 2003. DRIR 1083 (SW1500), ex-UPY 1083, exx-SP 2480, which was also purchased from UP on April 22, 2003. DRIR 996 (NW2) which is ex-BN (Burlington Northern Railroad) 419, exx-SLSF 259. DRIR's SW1, with no number, was ex-BN 88 and originally CB&Q 9143 In May 2010 the railroad acquired GP16 1606. This engine was previously on the Aberdeen, Carolina and Western Railroad with the same number and before that was CSX 1835 ex Seaboard Coastline 4789. SCL 4789 was rebuilt from GP7 867 and was originally Charleston and Western Carolina 213
