= Colorado and Southern Railway =

American Class I railroad

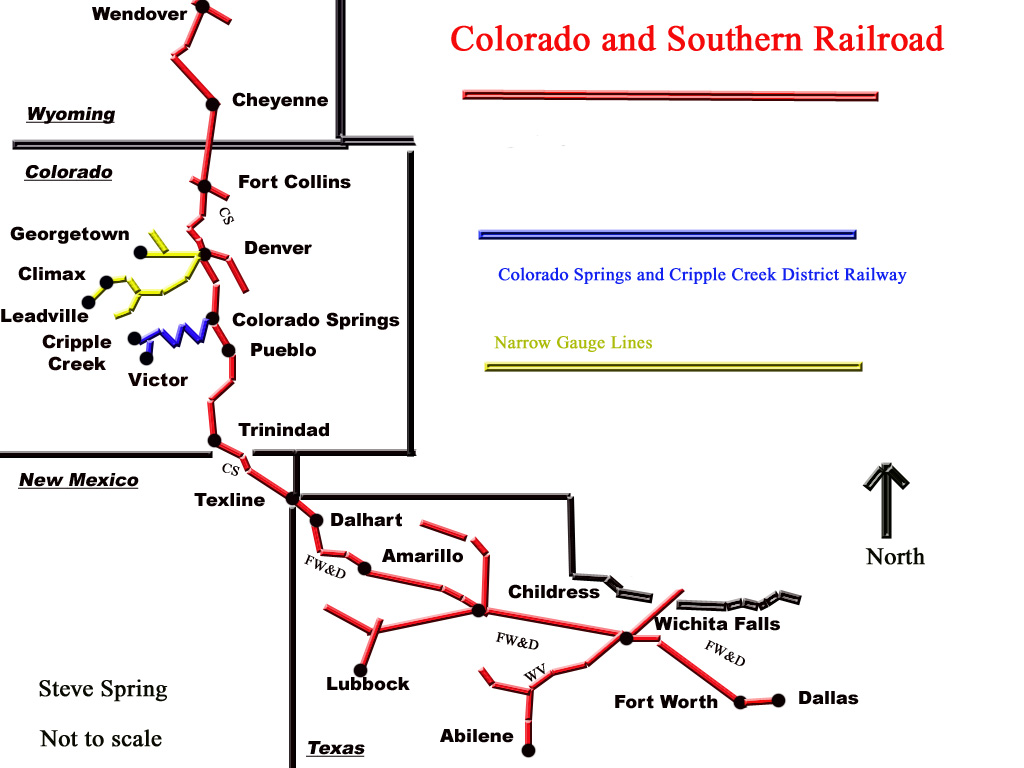
- Schematic map of C&S lines

Overview
- Reporting mark: C&S, CS, CX
- Locale: Colorado, Wyoming, New Mexico, Texas
- Dates of operation: 1898–1982
- Successor: Burlington Northern

Technical
- Track gauge: 4 ft 8 1/2 in (1,435 mm) standard gauge
- Previous gauge: 3 ft (914 mm)

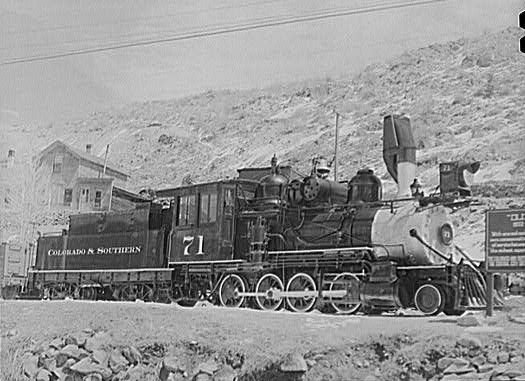
C&S Steam locomotive #71 1941.

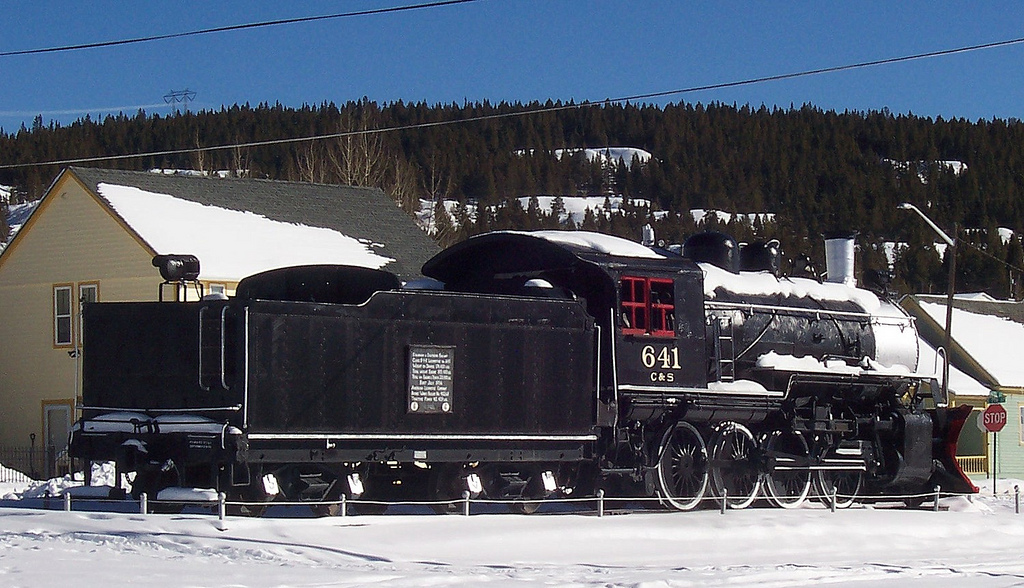
C&S Engine 641, the line's last operating standard-gauge steam locomotive, used on the Climax-Leadville run until 1962. On display in Leadville; photo 2010.

The Colorado and Southern Railway (reporting marks C&S, CS, CX) was an American Class I railroad in the western United States that operated independently from 1898 to 1908, then as part of the Chicago, Burlington and Quincy Railroad until it was absorbed into the Burlington Northern Railroad in 1982.

The railway began as the consolidation of bankrupt railroads in 1898. The Colorado Central Railroad and Cheyenne and Northern Railway were brought together to form the Union Pacific, Denver and Gulf Railway in 1890. When Union Pacific went bankrupt in 1893 they were separated from the Union Pacific and united with the Denver, Leadville and Gunnison Railway and others, by Frank Trumbull to form the Colorado and Southern Railroad in 1898. In 1908 the Chicago, Burlington and Quincy Railroad bought control of the C&S. It would later merge into the Burlington Northern Railroad in 1982.

At the end of 1970 it operated 692 miles of road on 1116 miles of track; that year it reported 1,365 million ton-miles (1,993 million tkm) of revenue freight. In 1980 route-miles had dropped to 678 but ton-miles had ballooned to 7,230 million ton-miles (10,560 million tkm): Powder River coal had arrived.

C&S was also the parent company of the Fort Worth and Denver Railway, which ran from a connection at Texline south and east into Texas. The FW&D was established as a separate company because Texas law required that railroads operating within its borders must be incorporated within that state.

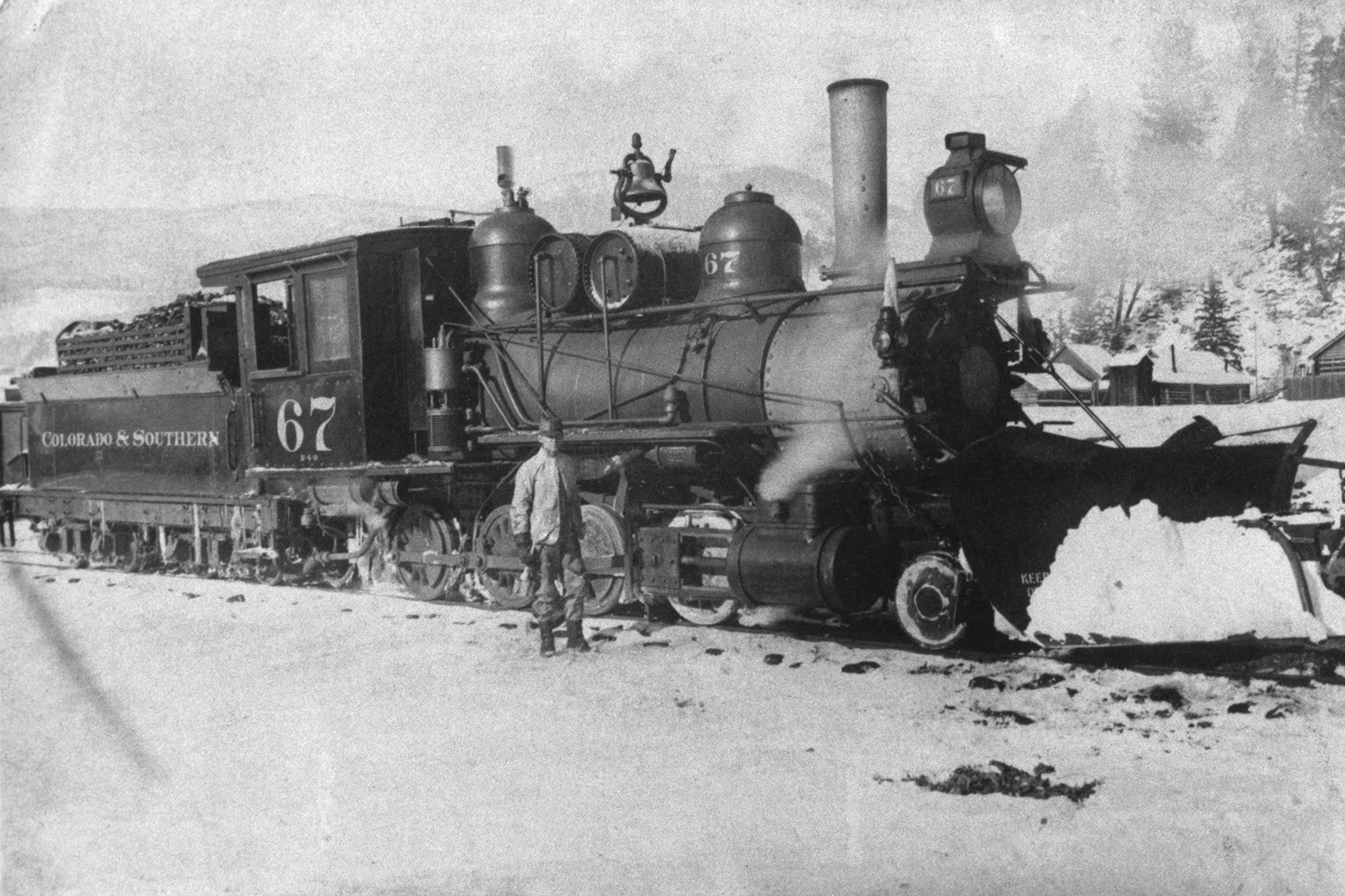
Colorado & Southern Locomotive plows snow from rails, c. 1898-1903 (Park County Local History Digital Archive)

== Narrow gauge ==
The Colorado and Southern 3-ft-gauge lines were formed in 1898 from the Colorado Central and the Denver, South Park and Pacific Railroads. The narrow gauge operations had four distinct portions: the Platte Canyon Line from Denver to Como, the Gunnison Line from Como to Gunnison via Alpine Tunnel, Highline between Como and Leadville, and the Clear Creek rail line from Denver to Silver Plume. Major Branch lines were the Baldwin branch between Gunnison and Baldwin; the Keystone from Dickey to Keystone; the Blackhawk branch between Forks Creek and Central City; the Alma Branch from Como to Alma; and the Morrison Branch from Denver to Morrison. The Colorado and Southern narrow gauge operations never owned a new engine, all the motive power was inherited from the former companies.

The Gilpin Railroad (earlier the Gilpin Tramway Company) was a 2 ft (610 mm) narrow gauge railway in Gilpin County operating from 1887 to 1917. However, on June 27, 1906, the Gilpin had been sold to the Colorado and Southern.

== Downfall of the narrow gauge ==
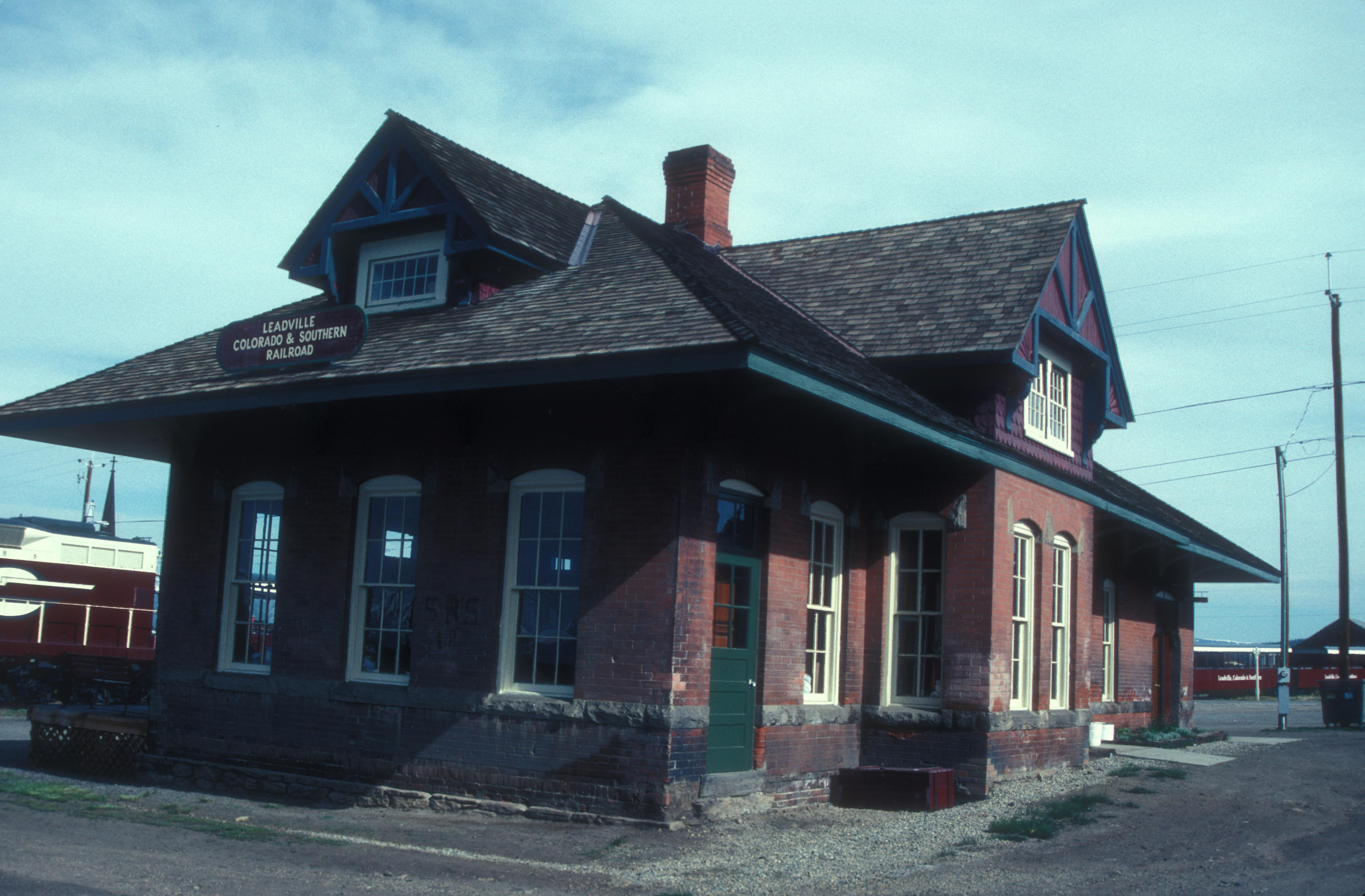
Colorado and Southern railway station, Leadville, Colorado

The Colorado and Southern narrow gauge was slowly abandoned piece by piece in the 33 years between 1910 and 1943. The first line to close was part of the Gunnison Line between Hancock and Quartz. This included Alpine Tunnel, although rail was not removed until the 1940s. The isolated segments between Quartz and Gunnison and Gunnison to Baldwin were leased and later sold to the Denver and Rio Grande Western Railroad. Quartz to Gunnison survived until 1936 and the Baldwin Branch lasted until 1954. The next line to be ripped up was between Garos and Buena Vista. This left another isolated line between Buena Vista and Hancock, which was abandoned four years later. The Morrison Branch was removed in 1926. In 1931 the portion of the Blackhawk branch between Central City and Blackhawk was removed. Times were tough during the Great Depression and by the end the narrow gauge was worn out. What was left of the former Denver South Park & Pacific between Denver and Leadville including the Alma and Keystone branches was removed in the summer of 1938, excluding the 20-mile portion between Denver and Waterton and the 14-mile segment between Leadville and Climax. The next line to fall was between Silver Plume and Idaho Springs, in 1939. This included the famous Georgetown Loop. In May 1941 the last of the Clear Creek lines began being torn up between Golden, Colorado and Idaho Springs. This included the Blackhawk branch. The dual-gauge third rail that had allowed narrow-gauge trains to run between Denver and Golden was also removed. (However, the standard gauge segment still exists today to serve the Coors Brewery.) Most of the track was removed in 1942 between Waterton and Chatfield. The rest was converted to standard gauge, ending all narrow-gauge service out of Denver. The last narrow-gauge operation, between Leadville and the Climax mines, was converted to standard gauge to handle heavy traffic from World War II. The last Colorado and Southern narrow-gauge train, pulled by engine 76, ran the 28 mile roundtrip on August 25, 1943. The next day standard-gauge locomotives began hauling the loads. The C&S narrow gauge thus became part of history.

== Narrow gauge today ==
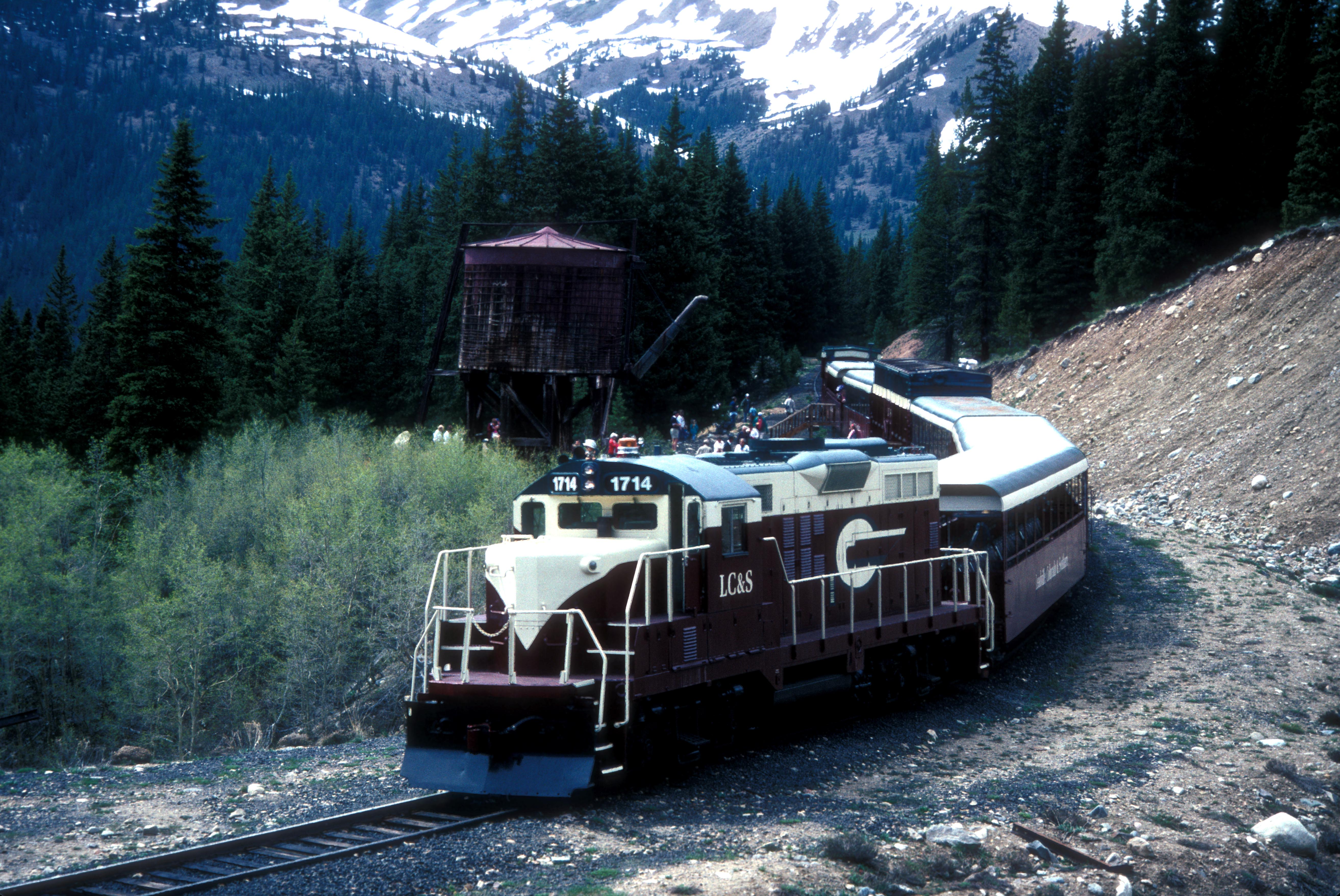
An excursion train of the Leadville, Colorado and Southern stops at the French Gulch tank

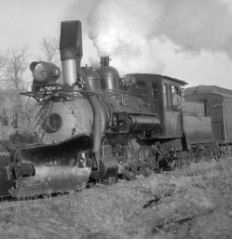
This photo shows Colorado & Southern Ry. #9 (which was originally Denver, South Park & Pacific RR #72) near the end of its service life in the 20th century. This engine still exists, is on display in Breckenridge, Colorado, and has been restored to its 20th-century configuration.

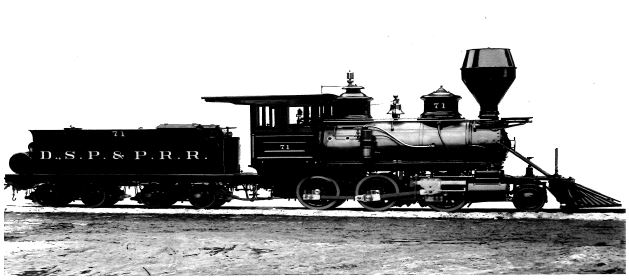
This photo of Denver, South Park & Pacific #71 in 1884 shows what C&S 9 (originally DSP&P 72, above) originally looked like.

Not much of the narrow gauge survives today. There are five surviving Locomotives: 2-8-0 C&S #31 (Baldwin, 1880) is at the Colorado Railroad Museum painted as Denver Leadville and Gunnison 191, 2-8-0 C&S#71 (pictured above) (Baldwin, 1897) is on display in Central City, Colorado, 2-6-0 C&S #9 (Cooke, 1884) is on display in Breckenridge, Colorado, 2-8-0 C&S #60 (Rhode Island, 1886) is on display in Idaho Springs, Colorado, and 2-8-0 C&S #74 (Brooks, 1898) is currently on display at the Colorado Railroad Museum in Golden, Colorado. Two roundhouses survive in Como, Colorado and Leadville, Colorado. Rolling stock has been scattered across the US. Some are on display in Colorado, one mail car found its way to Nebraska, and some boxcars are on the White Pass and Yukon Route in Alaska. Remaining Water towers are the French Gulch tank near Leadville, Bakers tank near Breckenridge, and Halfway tank near Alpine Tunnel. The Georgetown Loop was rebuilt as a tourist railroad in the 1980s and can be ridden from April through the first week in January.

== Predecessor railroads ==
The following lines were consolidated between 1890 and 1900 to form the C&S:

- Canon de Agua Railroad
- Cheyenne and Northern Railway
- Chicosa Canon Railway
- Colorado Central Railroad
- Denver, Cripple Creek and Southwestern Railroad

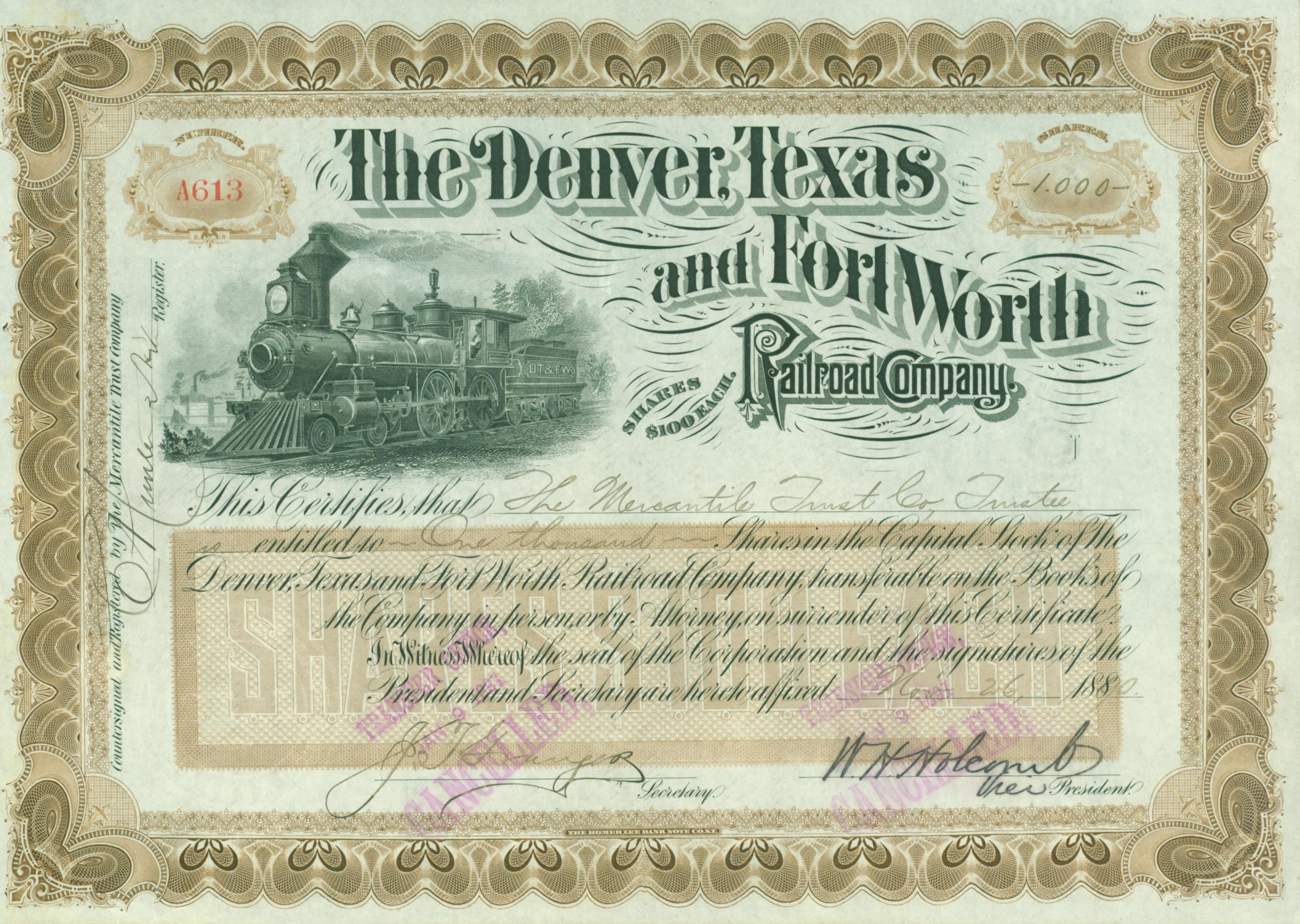
Share of the Denver, Texas and Fort Worth Railroad Company, issued 26 November 1890

- Denver, Leadville and Gunnison Railway
  - Denver, South Park and Pacific Railroad
- Denver, Marshall and Boulder Railway
- Denver and Middle Park Railroad
- Denver, Texas and Fort Worth Railroad
- Denver, Texas and Gulf Railroad
- Georgetown, Breckenridge and Leadville Railway
- Greeley, Salt Lake and Pacific Railway
- Leadville Mineral Belt Railway
- Road Canon Railroad
- Union Pacific, Denver and Gulf Railway

== See also ==
- Denver and Interurban Railroad — C&S subsidiary interurban railroad between Denver and Boulder with streetcar operations in Fort Collins
- Gilpin tramway
- Overton, Richard C. (1965). Burlington Route, a History of the Burlington Lines. Knopf.
- Drury, George H. (1991). The Historical Guide to North American Railroads. Kalmbach Publishing Co. ISBN 0-89024-072-8.
