= Union Pacific, Denver and Gulf Railway =

Railway in Colorado, USA

The Union Pacific, Denver and Gulf Railway was a subsidiary of Union Pacific Railroad created from what was the Colorado Central Railroad in 1890. It operated lines from Denver, Colorado through Cheyenne, Wyoming to Wendover, Wyoming and a route from Denver to Golden, Colorado. It also had a narrow gauge (36") line from Golden up Clear Creek to Central City, Colorado and Silver Plume, Colorado.

Creation of the company resulted from Charles Francis Adams, Jr.'s desire to operate in the Texas Panhandle area, which would give Union Pacific control over the shipping of cargoes from the Gulf of Mexico seaports to the North. In May 1889 Union Pacific and Denver, Texas and Fort Worth Railroad signed an "offensive and defensive union". Union Pacific received access to the panhandle routes in exchange for letting DTFWR handle freight moving from New York to the Northwest. However, in November 1889 Union Pacific changed their tactics and instead directly purchased controlling stock of the smaller railways in Panhandle area, including the DTFWR. These assets were pooled together into a new entity named Union Pacific, Denver and Gulf Railway. It lasted until 1898 when it was merged with other companies to become the Colorado and Southern Railway.
