= Colorado Central Railroad =

US railroad company from 1865

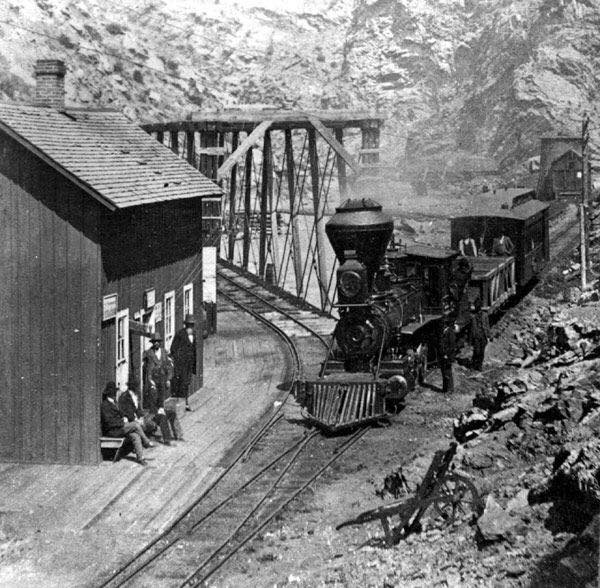
- Narrow Gauge Colorado Central Railroad in Clear Creek Canyon

The Colorado Central Railroad was a U.S. railroad company that operated in Colorado and southeastern Wyoming in the late 19th century. It was founded in the Colorado Territory in the wake of the Colorado Gold Rush to ship gold from the mountains. It expanded from its Golden–Denver line to form a crucial link connecting Colorado with the transcontinental railroad and the national rail network. The history of the railroad throughout the 1870s was driven at times by a fierce struggle between local interests, led by W.A.H. Loveland, and outside investors of the Union Pacific Railroad led at times by Jay Gould. The early struggle of the company to build its lines was a major part of the early competition between Denver and Golden for supremacy as the principal metropolis of Colorado.

Historic advertisement

The company built the first rail lines up connecting historic Colorado mining communities such as Black Hawk, Central City, and Idaho Springs. Through a series of reorganizations and acquisitions, it eventually became part of the Colorado and Southern Railway. Although its historic 3 ft (914 mm) narrow gauge mountain lines were dismantled by the mid 20th century, a portion of its connecting lines paralleling the Front Range survive as active lines of BNSF Railway.

== History ==
The railroad was chartered as the Colorado and Clear Creek Railroad Company on February 9, 1865, by Loveland and other entrepreneurs in the town of Golden, then the capital of the Colorado Territory. Loveland and his partners desired to build a 4 ft 8 1/2 in (1,435 mm) standard gauge railroad up Clear Creek Canyon to Central City and other mining centers, and to connect to nearby Denver and Boulder. During the three years before construction on the line began the company underwent several reorganizations. On January 20, 1866, the name of the railroad was changed to the Colorado Central & Pacific Railroad. The following year, in June 1867, the company was reorganized; Union Pacific investors were in control, but provided no funds for construction. That year, the seat of territorial government for Colorado was relocated from Golden to Denver.

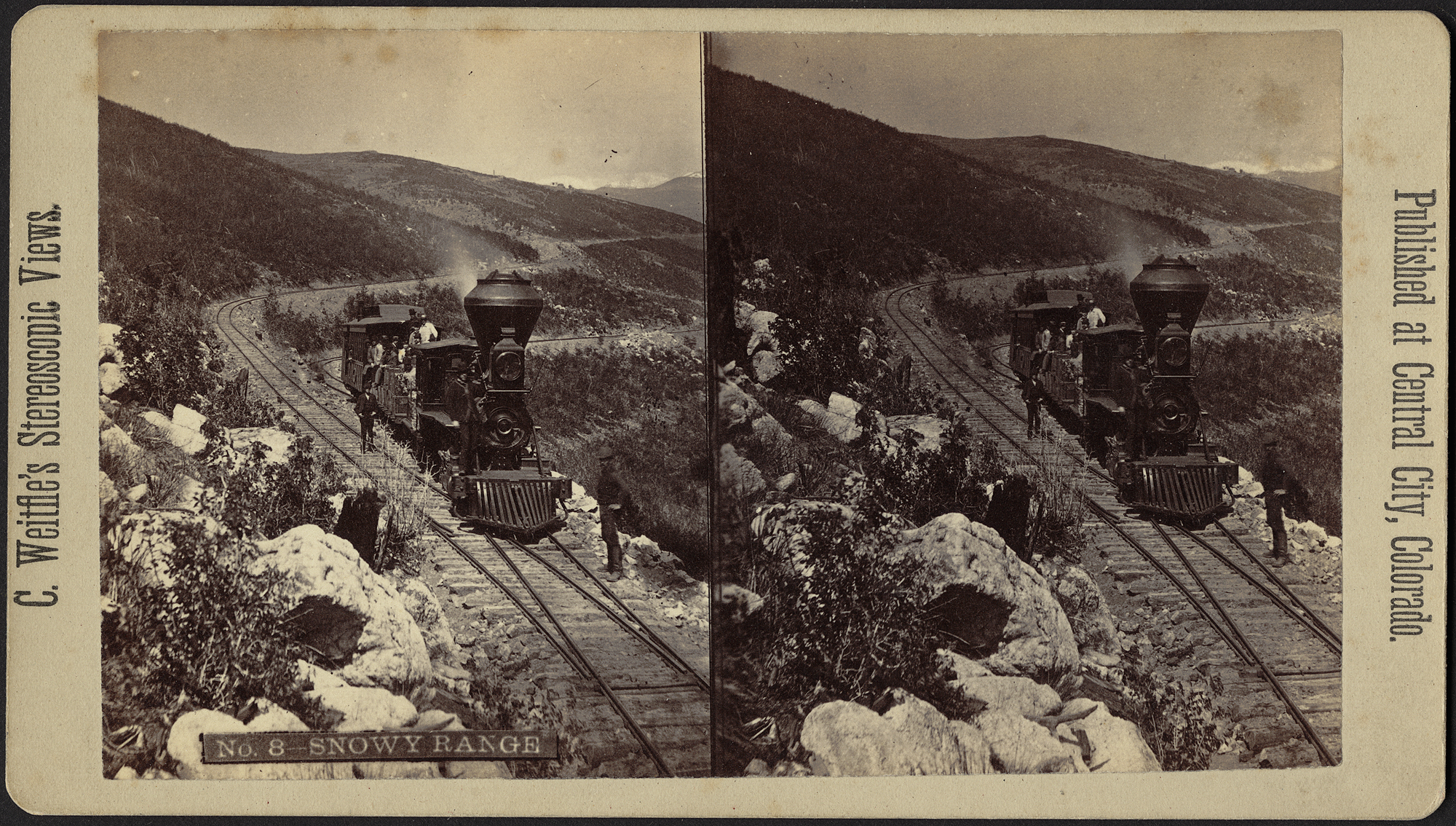
Stereoscopic image of the Snowy Range in Colorado with a train of the Colorado Central RR.

On January 1, 1868, construction began on the first line connecting Denver and Golden. On January 14, the company changed its name to Colorado Central Railroad. Construction of the first line was slow. By the end of the year, only the small portion (less than 12 miles) between Denver and Golden had been graded. In the meantime, former Territorial Governor John Evans and other business leaders from Denver City, including David Moffat, William Byers (Rocky Mountain News), Joseph E. Bates, Bela Hughes, Walter Cheesman (Denver Water) and Luther Kountze (Colorado National Bank), formed the Denver Pacific Railway on November 19, 1867, with the intention of building a rail line from Denver to Cheyenne. The formation of the Denver Pacific Railway and Telegraph Company set off an intense struggle over the next two years between the two companies to complete their lines connecting to Union Pacific. By the following year, the success of the Denver Pacific investors in persuading the United States Congress to grant them land allowing them to construct a line throughout the South Platte River valley to Cheyenne made it evident that Denver would prevail over Golden. The Denver Pacific line was complete in June 1870 and the first train arrived in Denver from Cheyenne, bypassing Golden. Two months later, the Kansas Pacific completed its line to Denver, linking up with the Denver Pacific, and cementing the central role of Denver in Colorado.

As a consequence, the Colorado Central turned its attention towards linking up with the Denver Pacific and Kansas Pacific lines. On September 24, 1870, the company achieved its first success with the completion of the standard gauge line from Golden to "Jersey Junction", the junction of the Kansas Pacific and Denver Pacific lines located approximately 3 miles north of Denver.

In May 1871 local interests regained control of the railroad from Union Pacific investors. By the following September, 150 men were at work in the mountains west of Golden to extend the line to the mining communities. In the spring of 1872 the company acquired critical right-of-way along Clear Creek to extend its line. West of Golden, the line built as 3 ft (914 mm) narrow gauge. In late August, the company took delivery of its first two locomotives (both 0-4-0T), the General Sherman, No. 2, followed a week later by General Sheridan, No. 1. On September 1, the track was completed 13.3 miles to Forks Creek. By mid-December, the line had been extended 7.7 miles further to Black Hawk. By February 24, 1873, a second line from Forks Creek had been extended 3.3 miles to Floyd Hill.

In September, the company's shop in Golden produced the first passenger car in Colorado. On May 11, 1874, the company took delivery of an 18-ton Mogul locomotive from Dawson & Baily. The new locomotive replaces the "Sheridan" as the #1 locomotive.

The see-saw battle for control of the company between local and outside interests continued during the expansion of its lines into the mountains. By the spring of 1873, Jay Gould and other Union Pacific investors had contributed a large financial stake in the railroad, but the company was still controlled by Loveland. The nationwide financial collapse that began later that year practically halted new construction on the company lines, instigating a period of legal struggles for control of the near-bankrupt enterprise. In 1875, in the midst of the depression, the Union Pacific controlled three-fourths of the company stock. In April, at a company board meeting, Union Pacific proxies voted to lease the company to the Kansas Pacific. The following month, the company board of directors repudiated the agreement by voiding the votes of the Union Pacific proxies on a technicality. The board re-established Loveland as president. On May 21, 1876, Loveland's forces seized physical control of assets of the Kansas Pacific. In retaliation, the Union Pacific sued the company, forcing it into receivership, during which time Loveland fought to keep control of the company through numerous court proceedings. In February 1877, the Union Pacific relinquished control to Loveland once again.

In 1877, with Loveland once again in control, and with the national Depression receding, the company began expanding its lines once again.

== See also ==
- Gilpin tramway
- Colorado & Southern
