= List of Colorado companies =

Coordinates: 38.9972°N 105.5478°W

The location of the state of Colorado in the United States

This list of Colorado companies includes notable companies that were created or headquartered in Colorado.

== Companies with headquarters in Colorado ==
=== A ===
- Agloves
- Aimco
- Air Methods
- Alterra Mountain Company
- American Furniture Warehouse
- American Medical Response
- The Anschutz Corporation
- Antero Resources
- AppExtremes
- Arrow Electronics
- Arrowhead Mills
- Aspen Skiing Company
- Avery Brewing Company

=== B ===
- Backflip Studios
- Ball Corporation
- BiggerPockets
- Boston Market
- Breckenridge Brewery
- The Broadmoor Manitou and Pikes Peak Cog Railway

=== C ===
- Celestial Seasonings
- Cherwell Software
- Chocolove
- City Market
- Colorado and Wyoming Railway
- Colorado Interstate Gas
- Colorado Pacific Railroad
- Colorado Pacific Rio Grande Railroad
- The Colorado Sun
- Coors Brewing Company
- CoorsTek
- CraftWorks Restaurants & Breweries
- Cripple Creek and Victor Narrow Gauge Railroad
- Crocs
- CSG International

=== D ===
- Datavail
- DaVita Inc.
- DCP Midstream Partners, LP
- The Denver Post
- Denver Rock Island Railroad
- Deseret Power Railway
- Digital First Media
- DigitalGlobe
- Dish Network
- Durango and Silverton Narrow Gauge Railroad
- Dynamic Materials Corporation

=== E ===
- eBags
- EchoStar
- Einstein Bros. Bagels
- Elope, Inc.
- Estes Industries
- Executive Recycling
- Exede
- Elevations Credit Union
- Empower Retirement

=== F ===
- FirstBank Holding Co
- FreeBSD Foundation
- Frontier Airlines

=== G ===
- Gaia, Inc
- Gates Corporation
- Georgetown Loop Railroad
- Golden Software
- Good Times Burgers & Frozen Custard
- Gray Line Worldwide
- Great Divide Brewing Company
- Great Lakes Aircraft Company
- Great Western Railway of Colorado

=== H ===
- Hammond's Candies
- HomeAdvisor

=== I ===
- Ibotta

=== J ===
- JBS USA
- Jeppesen
- Johns Manville

=== K ===
- Keenesburg Direct Railroad
- Key Lime Air
- Kidrobot
- King Soopers
- Kong Company
- Kroenke Sports & Entertainment

=== L ===
- LaMar's Donuts
- Leadville, Colorado and Southern Railroad
- Leopold Bros.
- Leprino Foods
- Level 3 Communications
- Liberty Global
- Liberty Media
- Liberty Skis
- Loaf 'N Jug
- Love Grown Foods

=== M ===
- MapQuest
- Matchstick Productions
- MDC Holdings
- Mile High Comics
- Molson Coors Brewing Company
- Mrs. Fields' Original Cookies Inc.
- Museum Store Company

=== N ===
- name.com
- National CineMedia
- Natural Grocers by Vitamin Cottage, Inc
- Navis Logistics Network
- Never Summer
- New Belgium Brewing Company
- Newmont Mining Corporation
- Noodles & Company
- The North Face
- Novus Biologicals

=== O ===
- Odell Brewing Company
- Osprey Packs
- OtterBox
- Ovintiv Inc.

=== P ===
- Palantir
- PCL Construction
- Peach Street Distillers
- PostNet
- PopSockets
- ProBuild
- Public Service Company of Colorado

=== Q ===
- Quark
- Quiznos
- Qurate Retail Group

=== R ===
- RE/MAX
- Red Robin
- Revolution Bioengineering
- Rock and Rail
- Rocky Mountain Chocolate
- Royal Gorge Route Railroad

=== S ===
- San Luis Central Railroad
- SBR Creative Media
- SCI Fidelity Records
- Smashburger IP Holder LLC
- SparkFun Electronics
- SpotX
- Spyder
- Spyderco
- Stranahan's Colorado Whiskey
- System76

=== T ===
- Thanasi Foods
- TransMontaigne
- TTEC Holdings, Inc.

=== U ===
- The Unseen Bean

=== V ===
- Vail Resorts
- Vectrus
- Ventria Bioscience
- Verio
- VF Corporation

=== W ===
- Warwick Hotels and Resorts
- Water Pik, Inc.
- Webroot
- Western Sugar Cooperative
- Western Union
- WhiteWave Foods
- Wing-Time
- Wolf Robotics
- Woodward, Inc.
- Woody's Chicago Style
- Worker Studio

=== X ===
- Xanterra Travel Collection
- Xero Shoes

=== Y ===
- Young Americans Bank

=== Z ===
- Zynex

== Companies founded but no longer based in Colorado ==
=== A ===
- Aerocar 2000

=== B ===
- Big O Tires
- Budget Truck Rental

=== C ===
- Chipotle Mexican Grill
- Ciber
- Corporate Express
- Cox Models

=== D ===
- Dex Media
- Discovery Holding Company

=== E ===
- Envision Healthcare

=== F ===
- Flying Dog Brewery

=== J ===
- Janus Capital Group
- Jolly Rancher

=== L ===
- Lärabar
- Level 3 Communications

=== M ===
- Magpul Industries
- MapQuest
- Mushkin
- MWH Global

=== N ===
- NextMedia Group

=== P ===
- Paladin Press

=== Q ===
- Qdoba Mexican Grill
- Qwest

=== R ===
- Range Fuels

=== S ===
- Samsonite
- Sports Authority

=== T ===
- Terra Soft Solutions

=== V ===
- Village Inn

== Former companies founded in Colorado ==
=== A ===
- Argentine Central Railway

=== C ===
- Cadillac and Lake City Railway
- Colorado and Southern Railway
- Colorado Central Railroad
- Colorado Midland Railway
- Colorado Springs and Cripple Creek District Railway
- Colorado Springs and Interurban Railway

=== D ===
- Denver and Intermountain Railroad
- Denver and New Orleans Railroad
- Denver and Rio Grande Western Railroad
- Denver and Salt Lake Railway
- Denver Pacific Railway and Telegraph Company
- Denver, South Park and Pacific Railroad

=== F ===
- Florence and Cripple Creek Railroad

=== G ===
- Georgetown, Breckenridge and Leadville Railway
- Gilpin Railroad
- Greeley, Salt Lake and Pacific Railway

=== L ===
- Little Book Cliff Railway

=== M ===
- Midland Terminal Railway
- MWH Global

=== R ===
- Rio Grande Industries
- Rio Grande Scenic Railroad
- Rio Grande Southern Railroad
- Rocky Mountain News

=== S ===
- Silverton, Gladstone and Northerly Railroad
- Silverton Northern Railroad
- Silverton Railroad
- Southern San Luis Valley Railroad

=== U ===
- Uintah Railway
- Union Pacific, Denver and Gulf Railway

== See also ==
- Bibliography of Colorado
- Geography of Colorado
- History of Colorado
- Index of Colorado-related articles
- List of Colorado-related lists
- List of companies with Denver area operations
- Outline of Colorado
