= List of companies with Denver area operations =

Coordinates: 39.7392°N 104.9850°W

Location of Denver in the United States

This is a list of notable companies based, or having major operations, in the Denver metropolitan area.

== Headquarters in Denver area ==
- American Medical Response – emergency services, corporate headquarters in Greenwood Village, Colorado
- Antero Resources – natural gas exploration
- Ardent Mills - Flour Milling
- Arrow Electronics – corporate headquarters
- Ball Aerospace & Technologies Corp. – aerospace, corporate headquarters in Westminster, Colorado
- Bremner Biscuit Company
- Coors Brewing Company – brewing and dining
- Crispin Porter + Bogusky – advertising
- DaVita Inc. – kidney dialysis and other healthcare services
- DigitalGlobe – digital satellite imagery
- DISH Network – pay–TV distributor
- Ebags.com – custom apparel
- EchoStar – satellite communication solutions
- Einstein Bros. Bagels – dining
- Frontier Airlines – commercial airline
- Gaiam
- Gates Rubber Company (Gates Corporation)
- Gray Line Worldwide – transportation
- Ibotta – mobile technology company
- The Integer Group – promotional, retail, and shopper marketing
- Janus Capital Group – financial services
- JD Edwards, now part of Oracle Corporation – financial services
- Jones Intercable – television and content distribution
- King Soopers, a division of Kroger – retail consumer goods
- LaMar's Donuts – dining
- Leprino Foods – food manufacturing
- Level 3 Communications – telecommunications
- Liberty Media – television and content origination and distribution
- MediaNews Group – news and media distribution
- Mrs. Fields – snack food franchise with corporate headquarters in Broomfield, Colorado
- Name.com – domain name registration and hosting
- National CineMedia – digital content service provider
- Never Summer – snowboard and skateboard manufacturer
- Newmont Mining – mining and oil exploration
- Noodles & Company – dining
- Palantir Technologies – software development
- Poppulo – internal communications software
- PostNet – Internet postal service provider
- Qdoba Mexican Grill – dining
- Quark, Inc. – software development
- Quiznos – dining
- Red Lion Hotels Corporation
- Red Robin – dining
- RE/MAX – real estate
- Samsonite – specialty luggage manufacturer
- Smashburger – dining
- Sunrun – solar installer
- System76 – computer sales and manufacturing
- TCBY – frozen yogurt franchise with headquarters in Broomfield, Colorado
- TeleTech – outsourced call centers
- TransMontaigne – energy and oil refinement and distribution
- United Launch Alliance – spacecraft launch service provider
- Vail Resorts – travel and skiing
- VF Corporation – apparel
- Western Union – financial services
- Woody's Chicago Style – dining
- Xanterra Parks & Resorts – tourism and resorts

== Branch operations in Denver area ==
- Brown Brothers Harriman & Co. – investment operations
- CenturyLink – telecommunications
- CH2M Hill – engineering services
- Charles Schwab – financial services
- Charter Communications – television and content distribution
- Cisco systems – networking and security
- Comcast – television and content distribution
- Conoco – fuel refining
- Datadog – data observability/monitoring and cloud security
- DaVita Inc. – renal care, corporate headquarters
- DirecTV – television and content origination/distribution
- First Data Corp. – financial services
- GoDaddy.com – domain name registration
- Gymshark – clothing manufacturer
- Halliburton – oilfield services
- Hospital Corporation of America, dba HealthONE Colorado – healthcare
- Intuit, Inc. – website products
- K N Energy Inc., part of Kinder Morgan Inc. – engineering services
- Kiewit Western Co., a Kiewit Corporation company – construction
- Kroenke Sports & Entertainment – sports and entertainment
- Lockheed–Martin – space and aerospace technologies
- Medtronic – surgical device manufacturing
- Ovintiv – hydrocarbon exploration
- Owens & Minor – medical device distribution
- PCL Construction – commercial construction
- Raytheon – defense and aerospace
- Regal Entertainment Group (regional headquarters) – entertainment
- RE/MAX International – real estate
- Rocket Software – U2 software division
- Safeway Inc. – consumer goods (district headquarters)
- The Shaw Group – construction and consulting
- StorageTek, now part of Oracle Corporation – Internet and software development
- Sun Microsystems, now part of Oracle Corporation – Internet and software development
- Suncor Energy – energy and oil refinement and distribution
- Towers Watson – HR consulting
- United Airlines – commercial airlines
- VF Corporation – clothing panufacturer
- Visa Inc. – payment processor
- Washington Group International, part of URS Corporation – engineering, construction and management services
- Western Union – financial services
- Xcel Energy – electrical energy

== See also ==
- Bibliography of Colorado
- Geography of Colorado
- History of Colorado
- Index of Colorado–related articles
- List of Colorado companies
- List of Colorado–related lists
- Outline of Colorado
