= SBR =

SBR may refer to:

== Science and technology ==
- Sequencing batch reactor, for wastewater treatment
- Spectral band replication, to enhance audio codecs
- Shooting and bouncing rays, in computational electromagnetics
- Styrene-butadiene rubbers
- Serum bilirubin, in blood
- Screen-to-body ratio, a measurement for smartphones and tablets

== Military ==
- Short-barreled rifle, US legal designation
- Space-based radar, on satellites

== Organizations ==
- SBR Creative Media, advising radio stations
- Specialised Bulk Rail, a subsidiary of SCT Logistics in Australia
- Sportsbook Review, American sportsbook review website
- Station biologique de Roscoff, French oceanography station
- Stratford on Avon and Broadway Railway, England
- Stone Brothers Racing, a former Australian motor racing team

== Other uses ==
- Skills-based routing, of phone calls
- Standard Business Reporting, programs to reduce business regulations
- Shanghai Business Review
- Samuel Butler Room, the Middle Combination Room of St John's College, Cambridge
- Summit Bechtel Reserve, a high adventure base owned by Scouting America
- JoJo's Bizarre Adventure: Steel Ball Run, manga written by Hirohiko Araki
- Saibai Island Airport, IATA airport code "SBR"
