= Never summer =

Never summer may refer to:

- Never Summer Snowboard Company
- Never Summer Mountains
