= Book Cliff mines =

Coal mines in Colorado, United States

Coordinates: 39°11′47″N 108°28′19″W

The Book Cliff Mines were coal mines located near Grand Junction, Colorado, United States. They closed in 1925.

== History and description ==
By the time Grand Junction was three years old, it had become apparent to its citizens that they needed a good coal supply if the town were to grow and prosper. Early in 1884 an experienced coal miner named George Peyton Smith set out to locate a mine that would adequately supply the city's needs. In a remote and unexplored canyon of the Book Cliffs twelve miles from town he found a huge body of coal. Smith and several other men developed the discovery into what became known as the Book Cliff Mine. Three years later (1887) another coal mine was opened a half a mile north of the Book Cliff coal mine; it was called the Grand Valley Mine. Both mines were purchased by William Thomas Carpenter in the summer of 1888, and under his Grand Valley Fuel Company they were improved and further developed. He built the Little Book Cliff Railway to serve the mines. A small community of miners took root nearby. The U.S. post office established a branch there during June 1890, officially dubbing the settlement Carpenter, Colorado.

One of Carpenter's first improvements was the installation of a gravity powered tramway (known as a funicular) at each of the mines. Cars traveled the 1,000 feet (300 m) incline between the mine adit and coal tipple on three rail tracks (except at the passing point, where four rails were used). The mechanics of the trams were simple; one end of a wire rope was attached to the car at the mine and the other end to the car at the tipple. Between the two cars the rope was wound around a drum and brake mechanism located above the mine adit. The weight of the loaded car traveling down was thus used to return an empty car from the tipple to the mine.

When Isaac Chauncy Wyman acquired the Book Cliff company in 1897, he installed his nephew William Stanley Phillips as manager. Phillips proved to be as concerned and capable a lieutenant as Wyman could have hoped for.

Following the turn of the century the mines developed serious problems. The Grand Valley Mine was running out of coal and in the Book Cliff Mine the slope of the vein had become so steep that it was rapidly becoming impractical to work the mine. Phillips began a new mine, south of the Book Cliff Mine in Coal Mesa, which he hoped would produce a mine with unlimited potential. The prospect mine failed and the only choice he had was to tunnel through 700 feet (210 m) of sandstone (beneath the original Book Cliff Mine) into the vein at a lower, workable level. This was finally accomplished in 1905 and is today the mine that has "Carpenter" cut into the stone over the adit. Production resumed and all went well until 1910 when Isaac Wyman died, in his will he left the railroad and the mining properties to Princeton University. The university kept Phillips to manage the properties until his death in late 1915. Princeton University then managed the mine in absence but the life had gone out of the company and it began deteriorating slowly.

Early in July 1923 a coal seam fire started within the mine. Princeton was forced to close the mine and spend large sums of money in unsuccessful attempts to extinguish the fire. The firefight was still going on into January 1924 when the mine was reopened though this didn’t last long and the mine was resealed on June 23, 1924. In January 1925 as the university was waiting for the fire to dissipate, Book Cliff Coal Company president John Fry died. With his death the university had finally given up, the mine properties and railroad was sold to the Monument Investment Company of Grand Junction for $8,000, the investment company only wanted it for the undeveloped railroad properties in the heart of downtown Grand Junction. Everything related to the railroad and mine was sold off, scrapped, or just given away.

Three Grand Junction teenagers suffocated to death while exploring the Book Cliff Mine on August 13, 1989. Following the incident the mine adit was permanently sealed.
