= Bremner Wafer =

Type of water cracker

Bremner Wafers are a water cracker made by the Bremner Biscuit Company. The company claims that the crackers "have a neutral taste" and that they are "perfect for pairing with a fine wine or savoring with cheese and pâté or seafood, soups and salads". It is because of this "neutral" taste that many wineries and food aficionados around the world prefer using the Bremner wafer as a wine tasting cracker. This neutral taste, however, is seen as a drawback by some because it means the crackers are nearly tasteless when eaten alone.

As of December 2023 the Bremner Wafer product has been discontinued.

== Flavors ==
In 2001, the Caraway Wafers were introduced, being marketed as combining "...the delicate flavor of caraway seeds with the crunch of Bremner Biscuits." In 2004, the Oyster Crackers were introduced to the U.S. and Canada.

As of February 5, 2006, there are 8 variations of the original Bremner Wafer:

- Original Wafers: suitable for fine wines as described above
- Sesame Wafers: "an excellent complement to cheese, pate, smoked fish or any spread"
- Cracked Wheat Wafers: for topping and spreads
- Low Sodium Wafers
- Caraway Wafers: designed for strong flavors such as Swiss Cheese
- Crackers Made with Pure Sunflower Oil: for appetizers
- Oyster Crackers Made with Pure Sunflower Oil: best suited for adding to soups.

== See also ==
- List of crackers
