= Carpenter, Colorado =

Ghost town in Mesa County, Colorado, USA

- ghost town
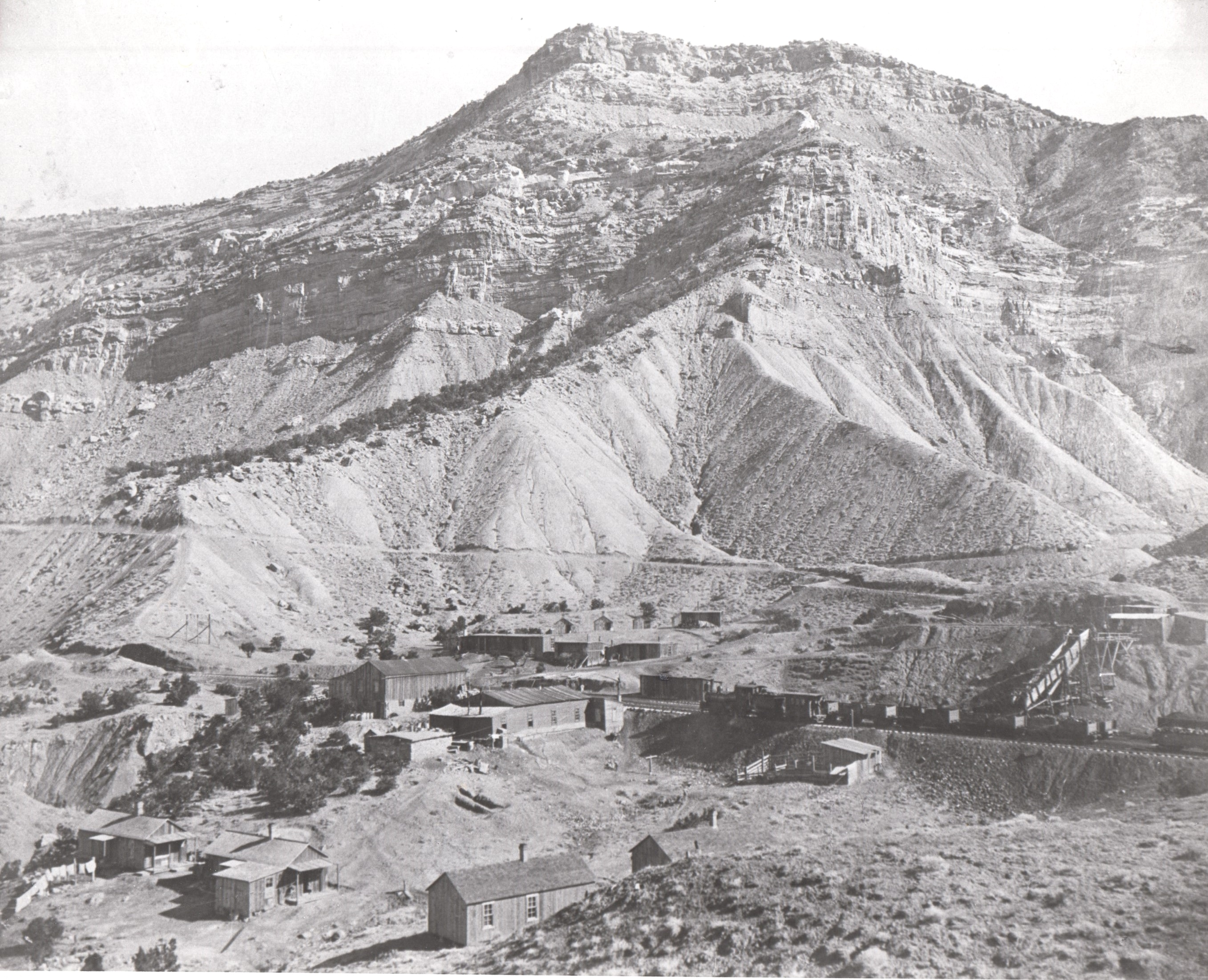
- Carpenter, ca. 1895. Grand Valley Mine tipple for loading coal into gondolas of the Little Book Cliff Railway

- Location of Carpenter, Colorado. Carpenter (Colorado)
- Coordinates: 39°11′40″N 108°28′24″W
- Country: United States
- State: Colorado
- County: Mesa
- Elevation: 5,808 ft (1,770 m)
- Time zone: UTC−07:00 (MST)
  - Summer (DST): UTC−06:00 (MDT)
- GNIS pop ID: (no longer listed)

Carpenter is an extinct coal mining town located in Mesa County, Colorado, United States, twelve miles (19 km) northeast of Grand Junction at the end of an extension to 27¼ Road. The townsite is located at coordinates 39.1944°N 108.4733°W, at an elevation of 5,808 feet (1,770 m).

== History ==
The settlement was established by William Thomas Carpenter early in 1890, to provide the miners who worked in his two Book Cliff mines with a place to live. He began building shacks to house his single miners and later erected small houses for the employees with families. The Carpenter, Colorado, post office operated from June 11, 1890, August 3, 1891.

However, the town never attained a population of over 50. After the closure of its post office, Carpenter built a company store and a combination boarding house/restaurant. Book Cliff company stone cutters and masons constructed several buildings and many foundations at Carpenter, using stone from the company quarry near the cliffs. One of the finest examples of a building made of Book Cliff sandstone is the Fruita, Colorado Catholic church.

Several years of prosperity followed the arrival of the Little Book Cliff Railway at the townsite in 1892. Carpenter began to formulate big plans for his village. He envisioned it as a tourist resort complete with hotel, dance pavilion, picnic areas and even a lake that was to be fed by a spring, located near his Book Cliff mines. Carpenter renamed the camp Poland Spring after a noted resort of that name in Maine. It was variously referred to as Polen, Pollen, and Polan Springs, although Carpenter's intended name was evidenced by his having it emblazoned on the side of one of his railroad excursion cars. The resort plans were never completed because Carpenter went broke shortly after the Panic of 1893.

Isaac Chauncey Wyman, a wealthy Massachusetts investor, became the next owner of the Book Cliff company. The town continued to enjoy an active existence because he did much to improve the mines and thus created a need for additional employees. The old eating house, referred to as the Hotel de Carpenter on occasion, was converted into a school and church for the camp's inhabitants, and many company structures were rebuilt and improved during Wyman's tenure as owner. The new name Book Cliff was applied to the town, but did not adhere any better than did Poland Springs. Usually, people referred to the place as the “Book Cliff Mines.”

The town reached its zenith and then began a gradual decline following Wyman's death in 1910. In his will, Wyman left the town, railroad, and mines to Princeton University. Princeton managed everything for 15 years then decided to abandon it all in 1925. By the end of that summer, nearly everything had been sold, dismantled and hauled away.

== See also ==
- Grand Junction, CO Metropolitan Statistical Area
- List of ghost towns in Colorado
