= Breckenridge Brewery =

American brewing company based in Littleton, Colorado

- Industry: Alcoholic beverage
- Founded: 1990
- Founder: Richard Squire
- Headquarters: Littleton, CO, United States
- Area served: USA
- Key people: Todd Usry (president)
- Products: Beer
- Owner: Tilray
- Website: breckbrew.com

Breckenridge Brewery is an American brewing company based in Littleton, Colorado. Select beers can be found in 42 US states. The company was purchased by Anheuser-Busch InBev in 2016 and resold to Tilray in 2023.

== History ==
=== Founding ===
Breckenridge Brewery was founded in Breckenridge, Colorado, by Richard Squire in 1990. It was Colorado's third craft brewery. In 1991, Squire brought on Todd Usry, who took over as brewmaster in 1994. Usry became director of production and sales in 2008, and was ultimately named the company's president.

=== Expansion ===
In 1992, the brewery expanded operations beyond Breckenridge, opening a manufacturing facility in Denver adjacent to what would become Coors Field, home of the Colorado Rockies. In 1996, Breckenridge moved the brewing, kegging and bottling of its beer to a new facility south of downtown. The original Denver location, Breck on Blake, remained open until April of 2018 when it became the second location for famous Denver restaurant The Cherry Cricket. In 2010, Wynkoop announced a merger with Breckenridge to form the holding company Breckenridge-Wynkoop LLC. The company also owns the Wynkoop Brewing Company, Phantom Canyon Brewing, and several restaurants. In January 2013, Breckenridge Brewery announced that its facility, by then producing 64,000 barrels of beer per year, was at max capacity and would be moving to a new brewery complex. In June 2015, Breckenridge Brewery left Denver and moved into its new $36 million, 12-acre, 85,000-square-foot campus in Littleton, Colorado, which includes three buildings: a brewhouse and office building, a building for fermentation and packaging, and its 300-seat Farm House restaurant and beer garden.

Breckenridge Brewery ranked #50 on the Brewers Association's 2014 list of the largest US craft breweries, and #47 on the 2015 list. The Brewers Association ranked Breckenridge Brewery as Colorado's fifth-largest craft brewer by barrels produced in 2015. Early on, Breckenridge Brewery produced roughly 1,000 barrels of beer per year. By 2015, the company was producing over 70,000 barrels of beer, with its beers sold in 35 states in the US.

=== Purchase by Anheuser-Busch InBev ===
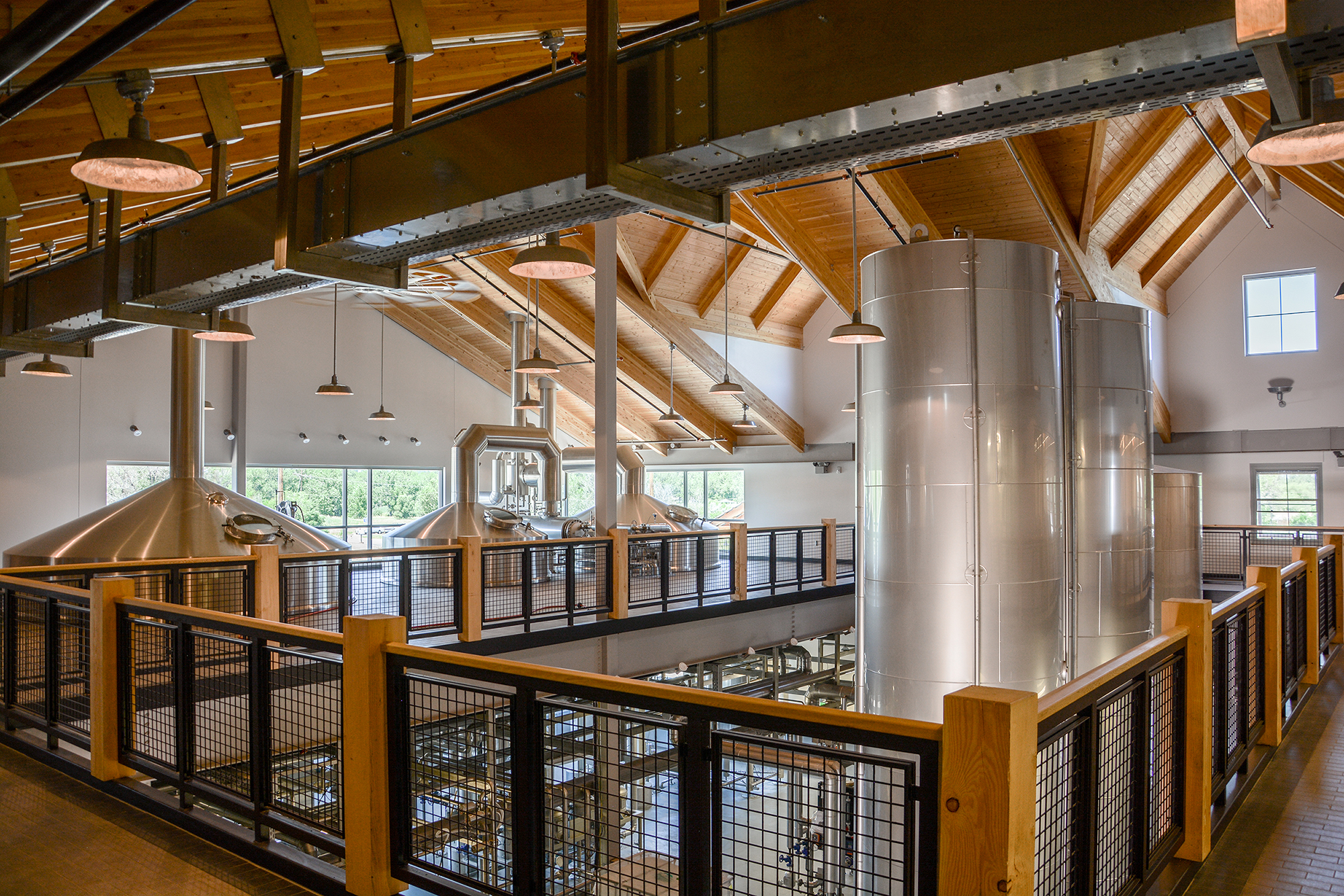
Interior of Breckenridge Brewery in Colorado in 2015.

On December 22, 2015, Anheuser-Busch InBev announced its intent to purchase Breckenridge Brewery from Breckenridge-Wynkoop LLC, as part of its High End craft and import beer brand unit. The acquisition, completed in 2016, included Breckenridge Brewery's production brewery and Farm House restaurant in Littleton, as well as its brewpub in Breckenridge. In an open letter to Breckenridge Brewery consumers, Usry said the brewery would continue to make its own decisions regarding the beer it creates.

== Partnerships ==
Every year since the inaugural 2012 Denver Comic Con, Breckenridge Brewery has collaborated with the convention to brew and sell a limited edition beer, with a comic-themed name chosen through an annual contest.

Since 2013, Breckenridge Brewery has regularly collaborated with Never Summer Industries for the creation of limited edition Artist Series snowboards and special release beers.

== List of beers brewed ==
Beer	Category	Available	Style	ABV%	IBU
Agave Wheat	Mainline	Year round	Unfiltered Wheat ale	4.4%	13
Avalanche Ale	Mainline	Year round	Amber ale	5.0%	19
Breck IPA	Mainline	Year round	IPA	6.3%	66
Breck Lager	Mainline	Year round	Lager	4.5%	14
Lucky U IPA	Mainline	Year round	IPA	5.7%	68
Mountain Beach	Mainline	Year round	Sour	4.5%	14
Mango Mosaic Pale Ale	Mainline	Year round	Pale ale	5.5%	29
Oatmeal Stout	Mainline	Year round	Oatmeal stout	5.0%	36
Vanilla Porter	Mainline	Year round	Vanilla porter	5.4%	16
Nitro Vanilla Porter	Nitro Series	Year round	Nitrogenated vanilla porter	5.4%	16
Nitro Lucky U IPA	Nitro Series	Year round	Nitrogenated IPA	5.7%	68
Autumn Ale	Seasonal	Fall	Brown Ale	6.0%	21
Christmas Ale	Seasonal	Winter	Winter ale	7.1%	22
Snow Glare Hoppy Wheat	Seasonal	Spring	Wheat ale	6.0%	23
Summer Pils	Seasonal	Summer	German Pilsner	5%	15
King's Dish	Small Batch	Limited	Burton ale	6.8%	55
471 Small Batch IPA	Small Batch	Year Round	Double IPA	9.2%	70
72 Imperial	Small Batch	Limited	Imperial chocolate cream stout	7.2%	11
Palisade Peach Wheat	Seasonal	Summer/Fall	Wheat Ale	5.3%	7
Hazy Pilsner	Seasonal		Saaz dry-hopped Pilsner	5%	30
Hop In Hand - Idaho 7			American IPA	7.7%	
Hugs & High Fives			American Lager	5.3%	
Imperial Porter			American Porter	7.5%	
Juice Drop Pineapple Orange	Mainline	Year Round	New England IPA	7.2%	44
Mile High City Golden Ale	CO Exclusive	Limited	American Ale	5.5%	20
Oatmeal Stout Ver. 2.0			Oatmeal Stout	6%	
Peanut Butter Stout			American Porter	5.9%	
Peerless Summer IPA			American IPA	6.4%	
Summer Pils Shandy	Mainline	Year Round	Fruit and Field Beer	4.3%	10
Vienna Lager			Vienna Lager	5%	
Buddy Pass Whiskey Barrel-Aged Oatmeal Stout	Small Batch	Limited	American Imperial Stout	10.5%	N/A
Juice Drop Hazy IPA	Mainline	Year Round	Hazy IPA	7%	60
Strawberry Sky	Mainline	Year Round	Kolsch	4.8%	23
