= Bremner Biscuit Company =

American food company

The Bremner Biscuit Company was founded by David F. Bremner in Chicago, Illinois. Bremner first introduced his brands of bread to the fire victims of the Great Chicago Fire. Although the Bremner Wafer wasn't invented until 1902, David Bremner's company was modestly successful prior to its invention. When his sons took over the business circa 1905 they developed the Bremner Wafer.

The company remained in Chicago until 1984, when they moved to Denver, where it remains today. The Bremner Biscut Company was bought by Dare Foods in September 1999. Although he is no longer the CEO, Neil Bremner (5th generation) runs Dare's baking division.

As of December 2023 the Bremner Wafer product has been discontinued.

== See also ==
- List of companies with Denver area operations
