= Little Book Cliff Railway =

Railway in Colorado, United States

The Little Book Cliff Railway (LBC) was a 3 ft (914 mm) narrow gauge that operated in Colorado, United States, from 1889 to 1925.

The LBC was incorporated on September 11, 1889, by William Thomas Carpenter and several other prominent Grand Junction, Colorado, business men. The purpose of the 12-mile (19 km) railroad was to haul coal from the Book Cliff mines owned by Carpenter to Grand Junction. Construction began in 1890 and progressed in sections until the rails finally reached Carpenter, Colorado, which was the station name applied to the Book Cliff mines' coal camp, in the third week of June 1892.

The LBC's first locomotive was a 20-year-old, 3 ft (914 mm) Denver and Rio Grande Railroad (D&RG) cast-off that Carpenter purchased for $1,200. Throughout the railroad’s 35-year existence it owned but five locomotives, two of which were unique gear-driven Shay locomotive types that were purchased new from the builder. Other rolling stock included about 30 coal cars, a caboose, two excursion cars, and a couple of flat cars for hauling stone and performing maintenance-of-way work. The road's cars and coaches were all built by Grand Junction craftsmen, except a few that were rented from the D&RG on occasion.

The LBC made money for Carpenter; he then re-invested it into a project to enlarge the road. The project, a railroad called the Colorado, Wyoming & Great Northern (CW&GN), would have negated the need for the Uintah Railway. The CW&GN financially overextended Carpenter and he was unable to weather the Panic of 1893. Isaac Chauncy Wyman then acquired the LBC through bond foreclosure and reincorporated it as the Book Cliff Railroad about 1900.

One of the most pleasant aspects of the railroad was the excursions it hosted. An outing to the Book Cliffs meant a day of hunting, horseback riding, hiking, picnicking, and a general good time. Of special note were the Memorial Day excursions; scores of people would go to Carpenter, gather the abundant wildflowers there and return to town with them to decorate their loved ones' graves. Associated with many excursions was a conveyance called a Go-devil. It consisted of little more than a few boards bolted together and attached to a set of handcar wheels. Thrill seekers used them to coast back down the tracks to Grand Junction at break-neck speeds.

The most interesting feature along the line was its double-horseshoe curve about 8 miles out of Grand Junction. It was there that most of the road's accidents occurred. The worst was when Locomotive No. 4 rolled on its side sometime between 1915 and 1925. A curious fact about the LBC was that it lacked locomotive turning facilities. Their locomotives operated facing the same direction the entire time the road owned them. When a train reached Carpenter, the engine was run around the train on a passing track, coupled to the other end, and it pulled the return trip to Grand Junction in reverse.

In 1925 the Monument Investment Company purchased the railroad from Princeton University in order to acquire the company's yard property in Grand Junction. They began railroad scrapping operations that summer and before long, pieces of the railroad were sold to buyers scattered throughout the country.
