= Wing-Time =

U.S. manufacturer of Buffalo and barbecue sauces

Wing-Time, Inc.
- Company type: Private
- Founded: Davis, California (1994)
- Headquarters: Steamboat Springs, Colorado, United States
- Key people: Terry Brown, Founder, Owner & President

Wing-Time, Inc. is a manufacturer of gourmet Buffalo Wing & Bar-B-Que sauces typically used for Buffalo wings. In 1994, Terry Brown started Wing-Time to bring his homemade sauces to market. Brown grew up in Upstate New York, the heart of wing country, where he learned the sauce skills necessary to produce a commercial product able to stand the test of time.

Based in the mountain town of Steamboat Springs, Colorado, Wing-Time sauces are shipped all over the country and exported to thousands of stores. These include specialty/gourmet stores, hot sauce shops, traditional grocery stores and department stores. Foodservice customers include high-volume wing eateries, restaurants, bar & grills and caterers. Wing-Time sauces can also be found in the military commissaries.

Wing-Time produces an all-natural and preservative free line of Buffalo Wing sauces. All the sauces (exc. Bar-B-Que) are also sugar free, gluten free, and contain no MSG. The entire line is available in 13 oz retail-sized bottles and 5-gallon pails for the food industry. There are easy-to-follow cooking instructions on how to make wings on every bottle. There is also a gift pack that contains all six flavors.

Wing-Time sauces have won numerous awards at various food shows around the country since its inception in 1994.

In 2013 owner Terry Brown sold Wing-Time, Inc to Panorama Foods, Inc.

== Flavors ==
Wing-time currently produces and sells 5 main sauces:

- Hot
- Medium
- Mild with Parmesan
- Garlic Buffalo
- Super Hot (with Habanero peppers)

== See also ==
- Buffalo Wings
