= Elevations Credit Union =

Credit union based in Boulder, Colorado, United States

- Company type: Credit union
- Industry: Financial Services
- Founded: 1952; 74 years ago
- Headquarters: Boulder, Colorado, United States
- Number of locations: 20
- Area served: Colorado
- Key people: Michael Calcote, President & CEO
- Total assets: $3.53 Billion (April 2026)
- Members: 180,415 (April 2026)
- Number of employees: 520
- Website: https://www.elevationscu.com/

Elevations Credit Union is a not-for-profit credit union with over $3 billion in assets and more than 170,000 members. The credit union serves Adams, Arapahoe, Boulder, Broomfield, Clear Creek, Delta, Denver, Douglas, Eagle, El Paso, Gilpin, Grand, Jefferson, Larimer, Mesa, Park, Summit and Weld counties. Elevations Credit Union is headquartered in Boulder Colorado.

Products and services include: checking and savings accounts, mortgage loans, credit cards, auto loans, home equity lines of credit, business loans, commercial lending and financial planning.

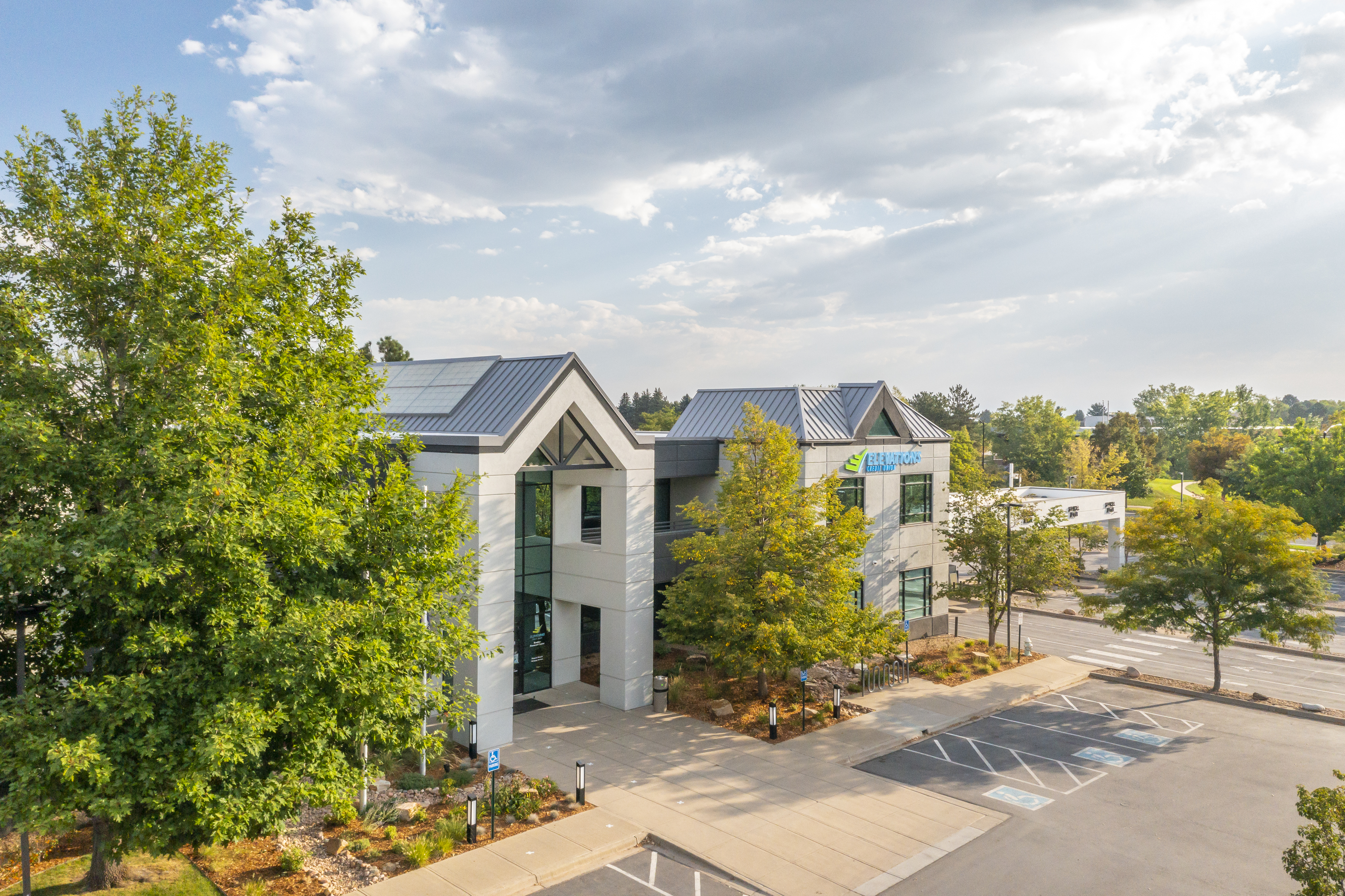

== History ==
Elevations Credit Union was founded in 1952 as the University of Colorado Federal Credit Union in Boulder, with 12 members and less than $100 in assets. The credit union offered savings accounts and personal loans to faculty and staff at the University of Colorado Boulder.

In 2006, the name of the credit union changed to Elevations Credit Union. In 2012, the credit union expanded its field of membership to include Adams and Larimer Counties. In 2010, the credit union joined a partnership which finances renewable energy projects and energy efficiency upgrades for its members. In 2015, its field of membership expanded to include Denver, Jefferson and Weld counties.

== Membership ==
Anyone who lives or works in Adams, Arapahoe, Boulder, Broomfield, Clear Creek, Delta, Denver, Douglas, El Paso, Gilpin, Grand, Jefferson, Larimer, Mesa, Park and Weld counties in Colorado can open an account. In addition, membership is open to students, faculty, staff and alumni association members of University of Colorado Boulder and Naropa University.
