= Mushkin =

American computer hardware company

Mushkin Enhanced MFG
- Type: Private
- Industry: Computer industry
- Founded: 1994; 32 years ago in Denver, Colorado, United States
- Founder: William Michael Mushkin
- Headquarters: Pflugerville, Texas
- Area served: Worldwide
- Products: Solid-state storage, memory modules, power supplies
- Parent: Avant Technology
- Website: poweredbymushkin.com

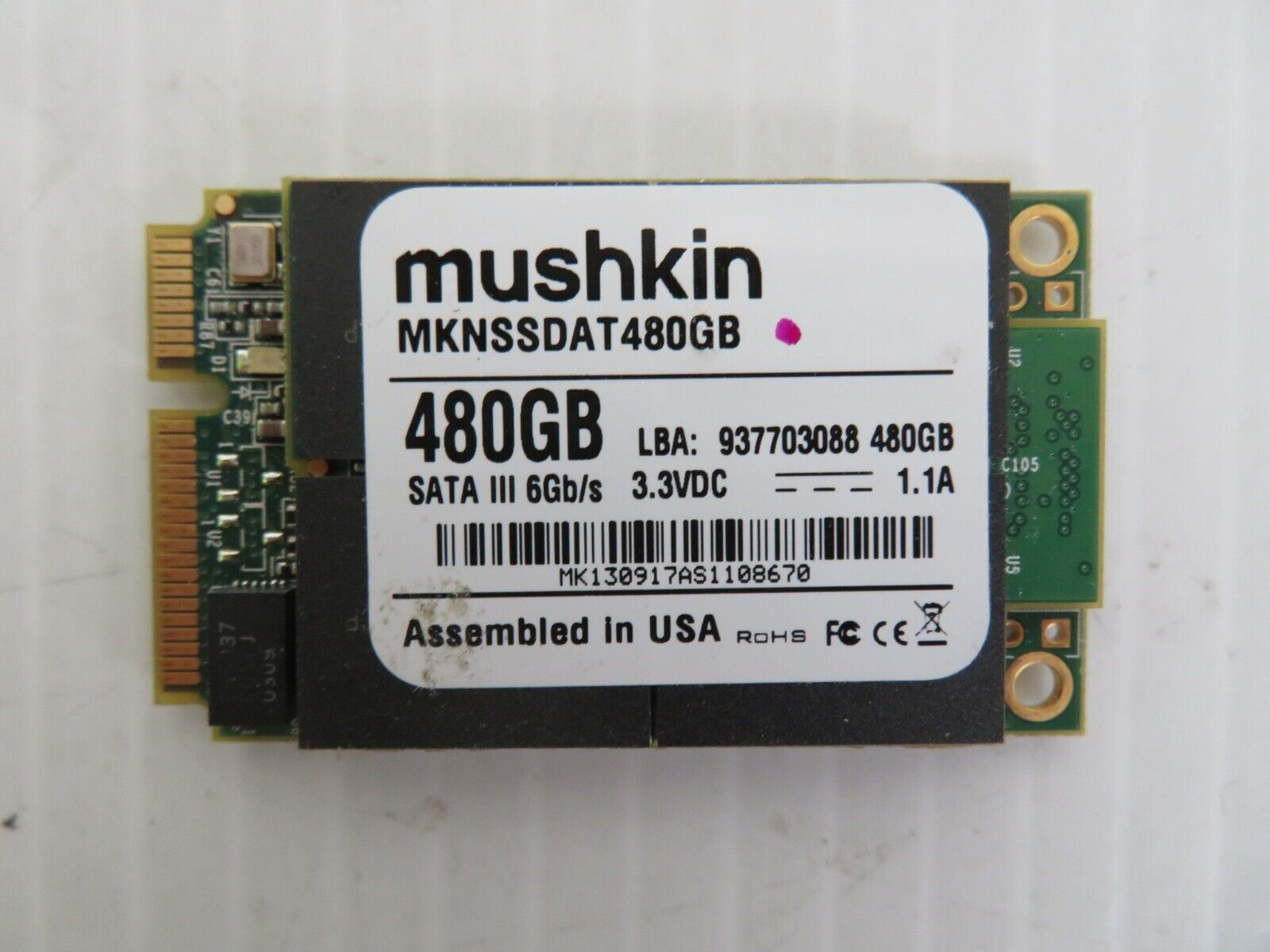
A Mushkin 480 GB MSATA solid-state drive

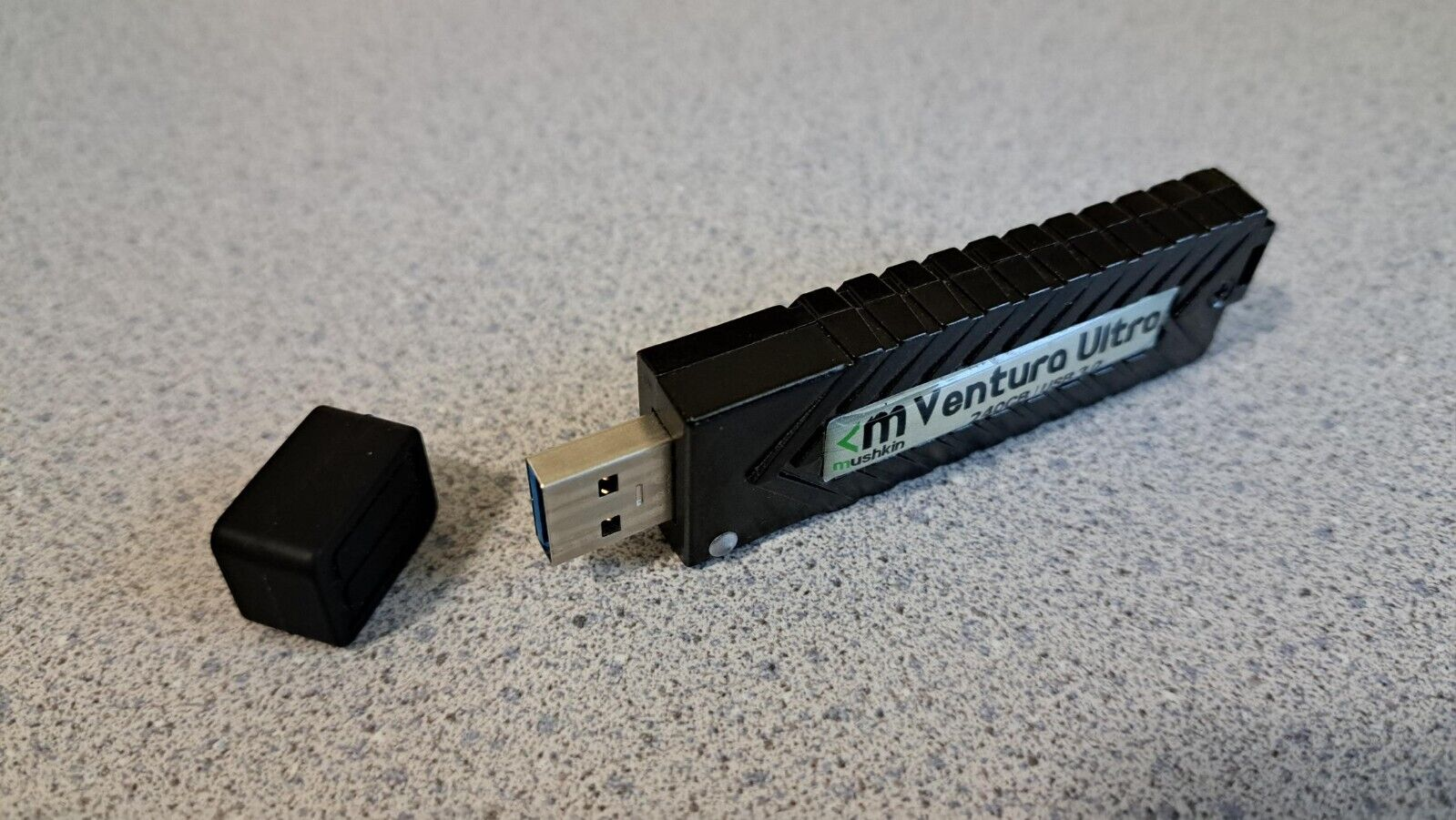
A Mushkin USB flash drive

Mushkin (/ˈmʊʃkɪn/) is an American computer hardware company best known for producing computer memory modules (RAM). Its customers include gamers and industry professionals. Mushkin products include solid-state drives, computer power supply units (PSUs), and RAM modules for desktops, servers, and laptops. They also produce a line of USB flash drives. Their memory products are available in several performance categories, including those intended for overclockers.

== History ==
Mushkin was founded in Denver, Colorado, in 1994. Ramtron International acquired Mushkin in June 2000. Mushkin became a wholly owned subsidiary of Ramtron, who used it to distribute memory modules made by its subsidiary, Enhanced Memory Systems. In 2003, George Stathakis, the general manager, purchased Mushkin from Ramtron and converted it into a worker-owned company. In 2018 Mushkin was owned by Avant Technology.
