= Navis Logistics Network =

- Company type: Franchise
- Industry: Packaging, Shipping
- Founded: 1980, Denver, Colorado
- Headquarters: Denver, Colorado, United States
- Key people: Ben Blakeley (Former President & CEO)
- Website: www.gonavis.com

Navis Logistics Network (NLN) is the former parent company of Navis Pack & Ship, based in Denver, Colorado, United States. The company formerly franchised Navis Pack & Ship (NP&S) and Handle With Care Packaging Store (HWCPS) shipping centers.

== History ==
NLN was founded in 1980 as a single, company-owned retail store operating under the Handle With Care Packaging Store name and began franchising in 1984 until it sold the HWCPS brand to Annex Brands, Inc. in late 2007.

In 2002, Navis opened a new franchise, Navis Pack & Ship Center, based on its original franchise only operating in a warehouse and specializing in difficult-to-ship and valuable items. Many of these items were fragile, large, awkward or valuable in size. The company trademarked FLAV to represent serving these items. Navis franchises use well known shipping and freight services, such as United Parcel Service, FedEx and Yellow.

In January, 2011, sold the Navis Pack & Ship brand to Annex Brands, Inc., headquartered in San Diego. Annex Brands also franchises other brands in the packing/shipping industry: PostalAnnex+, AIM Mail Centers, Handle With Care Packaging Store, Sunshine Pack & Ship, and Annex Copy Center.

== See also ==
- Flagler Global Logistics
