= Keenesburg Direct Railroad =

Switching railroad

The Keenesburg Direct Railroad is a switching railroad located in Keenesburg, Colorado. Per the notice of exemption filed with the Department of Transportation, Surface Transportation Board in 2013, the company was acquiring, and intended to operate as a common carrier, 0.16 miles (850 feet) of rail line running to an interchange with the BNSF.
