= Sportsbook Review =

American sportsbook reviews and betting analysis website

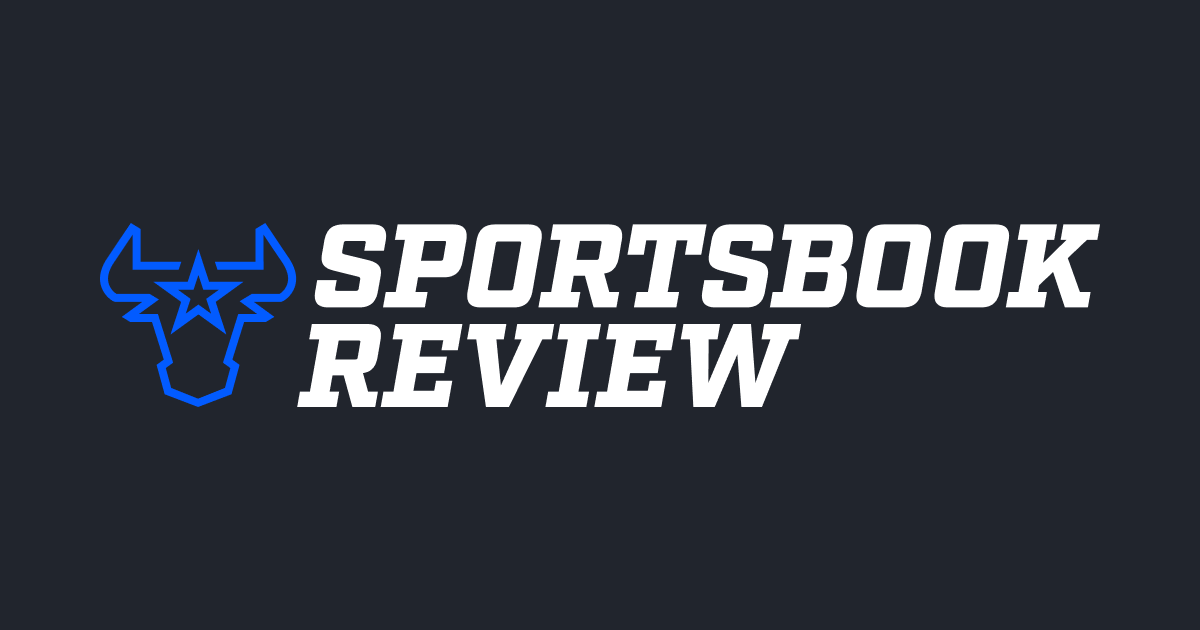
- Website type: Sportsbook review
- Available in: English
- Website: sportsbookreview.com
- Registration: Optional
- Launched: 1999
- Current status: Active

Sportsbook Review (SBR) is an American sportsbook reviews and betting analysis website. It also provides sports analytics and related commentary.

== History ==
Sportsbook Review was founded in 1999 as a watchdog for the sports betting industry. Since then it has expanded its features and now operates SBR Forum, SBR Odds, a sports betting news service, and contests for the community.

SBR was included in a $1.2 billion acquisition by Genius Sports in February 2026.

== Features ==
The SBR team consists of experts who review online sports betting sites in order to evaluate their fundamental features, sign-up procedure, terms and conditions, and more. It tracks the data of these features and compares them to market competitors to determine how each sportsbook compares to the average for the industry.

SBR provides a range of betting calculators, including round robin, arbitrage, and Kelly criterion calculators, for users to determine potential payouts. These tools can take inputs in American, fractional, or decimal formats for stake and odds calculations. It also provides guides that explain sports betting basics, terminology, and gambling concepts to novice, intermediate, and experienced sports bettors.

=== SBR Forum ===
SBR Forum is a forum on which users can use features such as loyalty program, earning points toward prizes, and odds service. Some sub-forums of the site include NBA odds forum, NCAAB betting forum, SBR college football forum, SBR tennis forum, SBR NHL forum, horse racing forum, live betting picks forum, and sports betting strategy forum.

=== SBR Odds ===
The SBR Odds provides a live comparison for various sports for a number of leading bookmakers. The website provides users with SBR BetPoints, which act as reward points for bettors who use the site. The websites odds and picks are regularly referred to online.

The websites picks and odds have been featured in the Bleacher Report, CNBC, Buffalo Business First, Seattle Times, San Francisco Gate, and the Huffington Post.
