= The Unseen Bean =

Coffee shop in Boulder, Colorado, U.S.

- Founded: 2004; 22 years ago
- Headquarters: Boulder, Colorado, United States
- Products: Coffee

The Unseen Bean is a coffee roasting company and café in Boulder, Colorado. Gerry Leary, blind since birth, started selling roasted coffee in 2004, and opened the retail café in March, 2007. Leary, who is also a disability rights advocate, advertises "blind roasted coffee" to rouse interest in prospective customers. Leary runs the business and roasts coffee with the help of a guide dog, who is also featured on the coffee's packaging; talking thermometers; and timers. He gauges when the coffee beans are roasted by smell and hearing. The Unseen Bean was featured in the 2008 Top of the Town issue of Denver magazine 5280. Leary received training and certification in roasting coffee from the Coffee Training Institute and West Coast Specialty Coffee Company in San Francisco, California.
