= Revolution Bioengineering =

Revolution Bioengineering is a biotech company in Fort Collins, Colorado, United States that is working to create a plant that changes color throughout the day on its own using synthetic biology techniques to harness genes involved in the color and internal clock systems in petunias. The company started as part of the inaugural class of Ireland-based SynBio Axlr8r, a three-month business accelerator program awarding $60,000 and mentoring to biotech start-ups using synthetic biology. One of the company's goals is to embrace the current GMO controversy and work to show capabilities of synthetic biology through their project.

== Plant science ==
To create the plants the project will utilize the existing anthocyanins in petunia. Anthocyanins color many flowers and fruits. They absorb light in the visible spectrum and may appear red, purple or blue depending on the pH, the presence or absence of metal ions, and other molecular interactions.

The color of the anthocyanins will be controlled using circadian rhythms, an internal clock system found in many organisms that works to control gene expression over time. Using the principles of synthetic biology, the company will control the expression of a gene that modifies pH. Connecting these systems genetically can potentially create plants that change color throughout the day.

== Synbio Axlr8r ==
Revolution Bioengineering was selected as part of the inaugural Ireland-based SynBio Axl8r program (now called IndieBio). Nikolai Braun and Keira Havens spent the summer of 2014 in Cork City, Ireland, working with University College Cork, to develop their science and business.

== Approach to GMO controversy ==
Color changing flowers are genetically modified organisms and as such will be subject to review through the USDA regulatory agency APHIS. While there has been substantial media coverage of resistance to agricultural genetic modification, as a non-food organism without engineered herbicide or pesticide resistance, it remains to be seen how the general public will respond to this new consumer biotechnology.

== Crowdfunding ==
According to their website the project will hold a crowd-funding campaign in early 2015 and plans to have their plants available to purchase in 2016 with more plant varieties following.
