= Datavail =

Companies based in Broomfield, Colorado

- Type: Private
- Industry: IT Services
- Founded: 2007
- Headquarters: Broomfield, Colorado
- Key people: Jerry Hawk, CEO
- Services: Database administration, Application Development and Managed Application services, DevOps, BI/DW, onsite staffing, and emergency support
- Revenue: 110M
- Owner: CIVC Partners
- Number of employees: 1000
- Website: www.datavail.com

Datavail is a database, application, and analytics service provider based in Broomfield, Colorado. The company provides services for DB2, Oracle, SQL, and MySQL databases. According to Inc., the company is the largest provider of remote database administration services in North America. Jerry Hawk serves as the company's CEO. Datavail has offices in India, Colombia, and Canada.

== History ==
Datavail was founded as a spin-off from Stratavia in 2008. In November, Datavail moved its headquarters from downtown Denver, Colorado to Broomfield, Colorado. The company managed 7,000 databases for 47 corporate clients that year. In November 2010, Datavail appointed Mark Perlstein as CEO. In 2022, former COO, Scott Frock, was promoted to CEO of the company. In 2026, Datavail appointed Jerry Hawk as CEO.

Datavail was acquired by private equity firm CIVC Partners in January 2024.

== Acquisitions ==
The company acquired Blue Gecko, a Seattle-based managed service provider, in July 2012. Blue Gecko operated as a subsidiary of Datavail after the acquisition.

In November 2021, the company acquired Skybridge Global. In January 2017, Datavail acquired Navantis, a Toronto-based company that specializes in Microsoft applications. In March, Datavail acquired Advanced EPM Consulting, Inc., an information technology company. Later that year, in July 2017, Datavail announced the acquisition of Accelatis, an enterprise performance management software platform company.
