= LaMar's Donuts =

Chain of gourmet, artisan, handmade doughnut

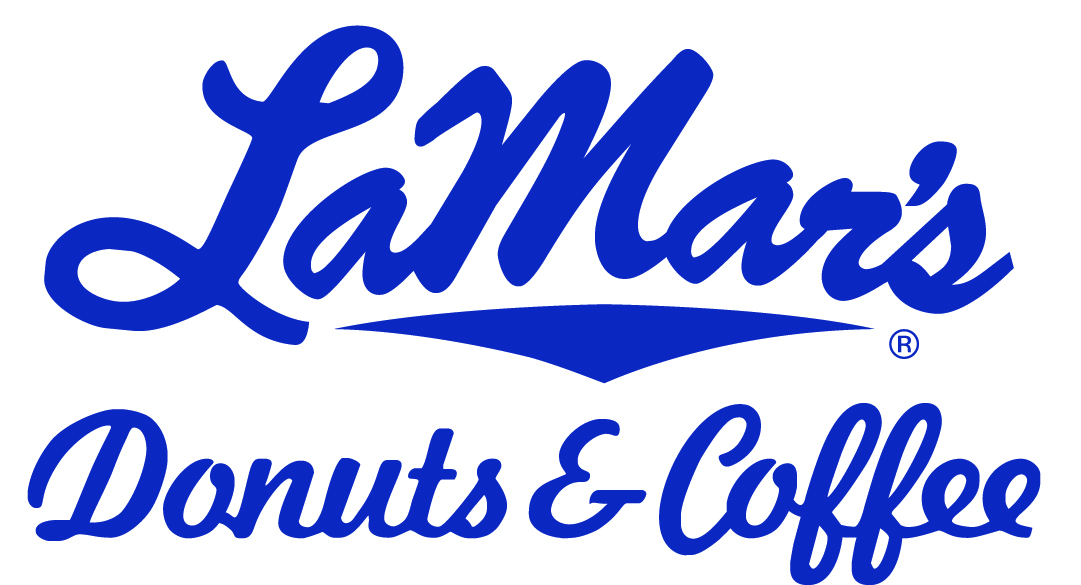

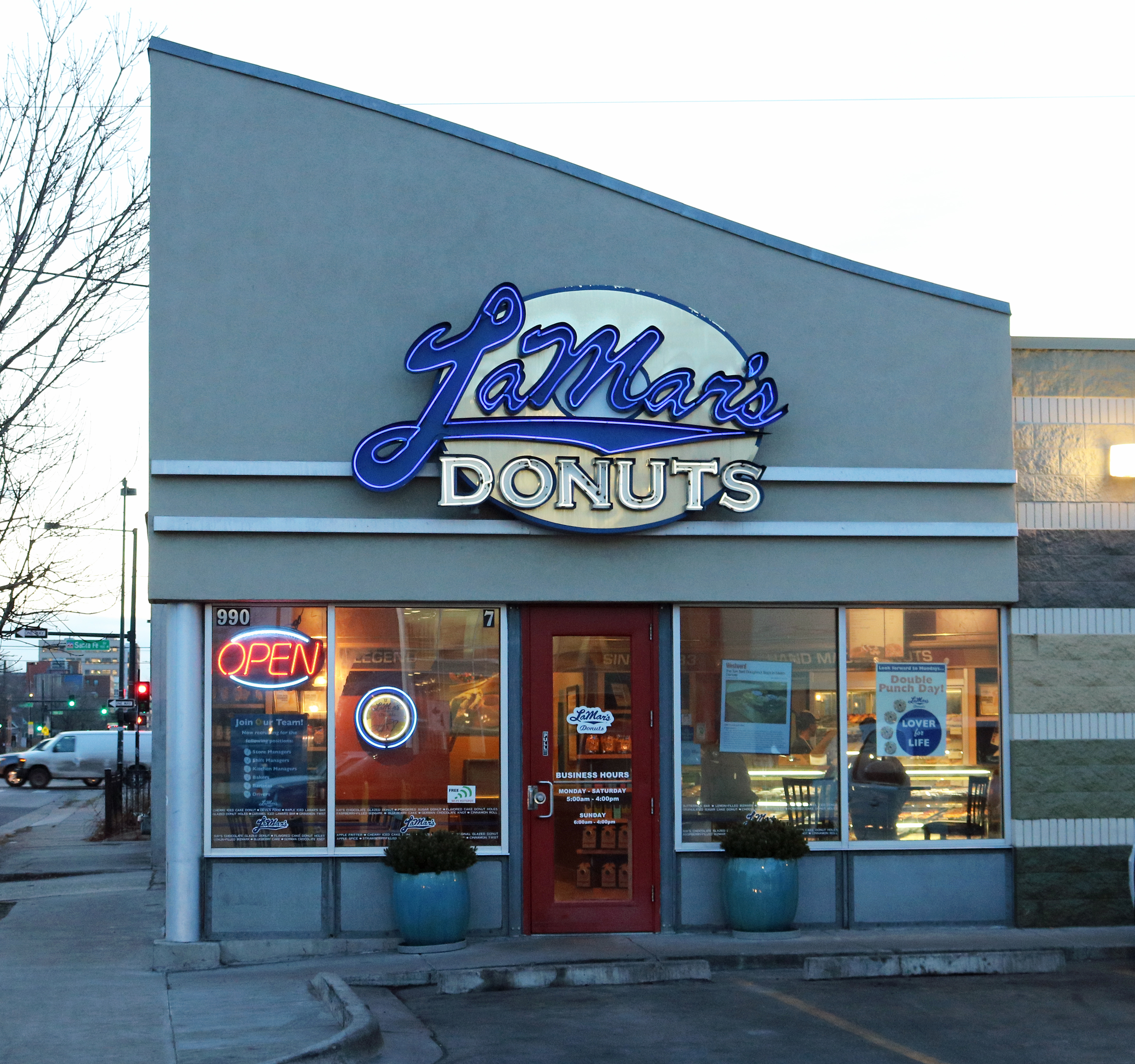
- A LaMar's shop in Denver, Colorado.

Restaurant information
- Food type: doughnut, donut, coffee, baked goods, hot beverages, frozen beverages, iced beverages
- Location: 3600 South Yosemite Street. Suite 750, Denver, Colorado, 80237
- Other locations: Arizona, Colorado, Kansas, Missouri & Nebraska
- Website: www.lamars.com

LaMar's Donuts and Coffee is a restaurant chain that sells donuts and coffee. It was founded in Kansas City, Missouri, with its headquarters in Denver, Colorado. Lamar's has 21 stores in four states: Colorado, Kansas, Missouri, and Nebraska. LaMar's Donuts has won newspaper readers' poll awards for best doughnuts in several cities.

== History ==
Raymond Lamar began making donuts in 1933 when he was 17 years old. He started crafting handmade donuts from scratch. He opened the first LaMar’s Donuts in a converted gas station in Kansas City, Missouri. Lines started forming before 6 a.m., and by closing time, more than 11,000 donuts were sold at this single location and LaMar’s Donuts has been in continuous operation since.

In the 90’s, Ray and Shannon Lamar took their passion to new heights by introducing franchising opportunities for LaMar’s Donuts. Today, our delectable delights can be found in stores across five states.

== Products ==
LaMar's offers a variety of donuts, including Ray's Original Glazed Donuts, cake donuts, and donut holes. They also offer specialties including LaMar's Bars, Bizmarks and sour cream donuts.

LaMar's roasts their coffee beans in Denver, then ships them to their stores. Their coffee drinks include cappuccinos, lattes, iced espresso-based beverages, and blended espresso-based drinks. LaMar's Donuts also offers a line of blended fruit smoothies called La Frappés.

== Media recognition ==
The donuts made by LaMar's have been positively reviewed by numerous national media sources including NBC's Jay Leno, The New Yorker, Food Network and the Zagat Survey. Jay Leno dubbed Ray the "King of Donuts." They are also included on several awards lists, including:

- Best of KC by 435 Magazine and Pitch Magazine in 2014
- Colorado's Best Food and Beverage Brand by Yahoo News in 2014
- Best of Omaha in 2016 by Omaha Magazine
- Feast Magazine's best donut shop in 2016
- Best Restaurant in Kansas and Denver in 2016 by Zomato.com
- Travel Channel's Best of Missouri in 2017

For National Donut Day in 2017, they became the first donut store to deliver donuts via air drone, making drops around Denver to the mayor, police, firefighters, and community members. This event generated media placements both locally and nationally, including features in four Denver TV stations, Denver Business Journal, Huffington Post, ABC News, and Mashable.

== Partnerships ==
LaMar's Donuts has participated in events such as the annual Whiskey and Donuts Festival in Denver. LaMar's Donuts works with local police officers to sponsor events on National Coffee with a Cop Day.

Lamar's has frequently partnered with The Salvation Army since 2009 to donate proceeds from the week of National Donut Day to the organization's youth services. They also celebrate this event by educating the community about the Salvation Army's programs and how people can help or contribute to their cause.

== See also ==
- List of doughnut shops
