= SBR Creative Media =

SBR Creative Media is a private business located near Boulder, Colorado. Often referred to as simply SBR, the business specializes in advising music radio stations in the U.S. and Canada on programming, promotion, research, marketing and staff. SBR also produces New Music Samplers and licenses private label CDs for radio stations.

== History ==
SBR was formed in July, 1991 by three founders whose last initial gave SBR its name: Ray Skibitisky, John Bradley and David Rahn. The business was known as SBR Radio Company until Skibitsky left and the company was re-organized under current co-presidents Bradley and Rahn and renamed SBR Creative Media in December 1998.

SBR designed, launched and operated Adult Rock station KXPK, 96.5 The Peak, in Denver, Colorado in the mid-1990s. Bradley and Rahn owned and operated Adult Contemporary station KLNN, Luna 103.7, in Taos, New Mexico from 2005 to 2010.
