= RE/MAX =

Real estate brokerage company

RE/MAX Holdings, Inc.

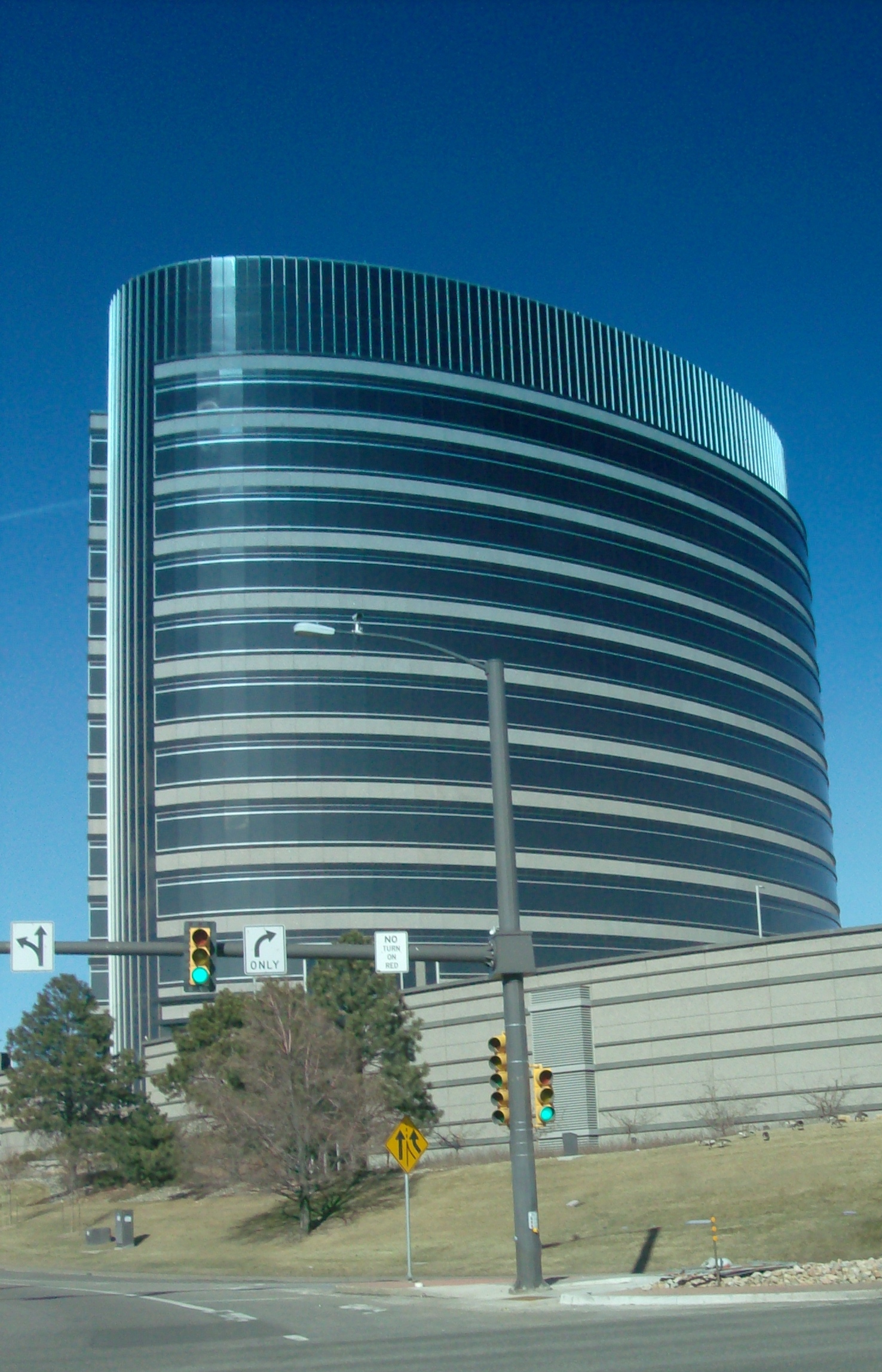
- RE/MAX Headquarters in the Denver Technological Center.
- Type: Public
- Traded as: NYSE: RMAX (Class A)
- Industry: Real estate
- Founded: January 30, 1973; 53 years ago
- Founders: Dave Liniger; Gail Liniger (formerly Main)
- Headquarters: Denver, Colorado, U.S.
- Key people: Karri Callahan, CFO; Grady Ligon, CIO
- Revenue: ▼$307 million (2024)
- Subsidiaries: RE/MAX, LLC; Motto Mortgage; wemlo
- Website: www.remax.com

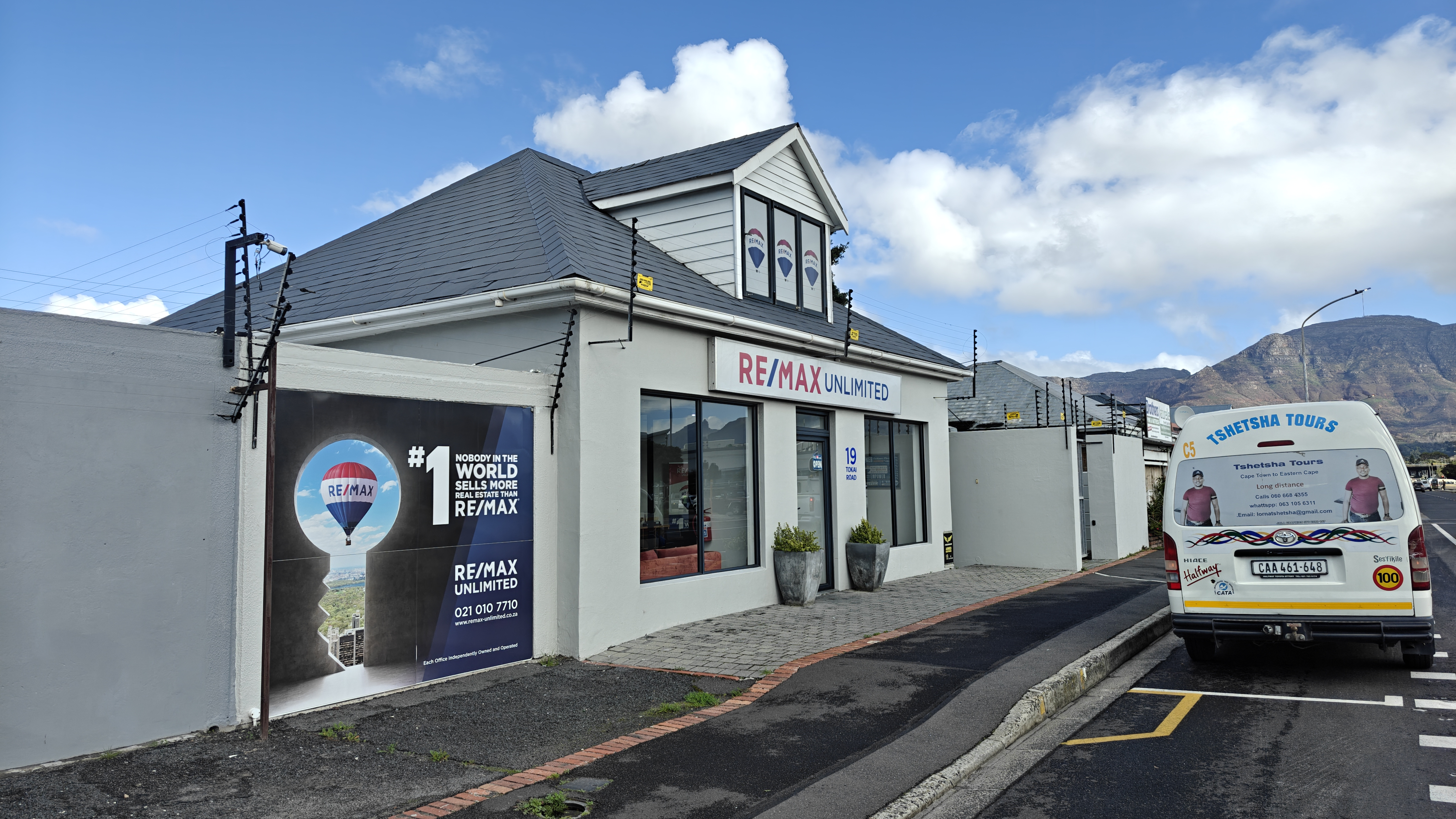
RE/MAX office in Kirstenhof, Cape Town, South Africa

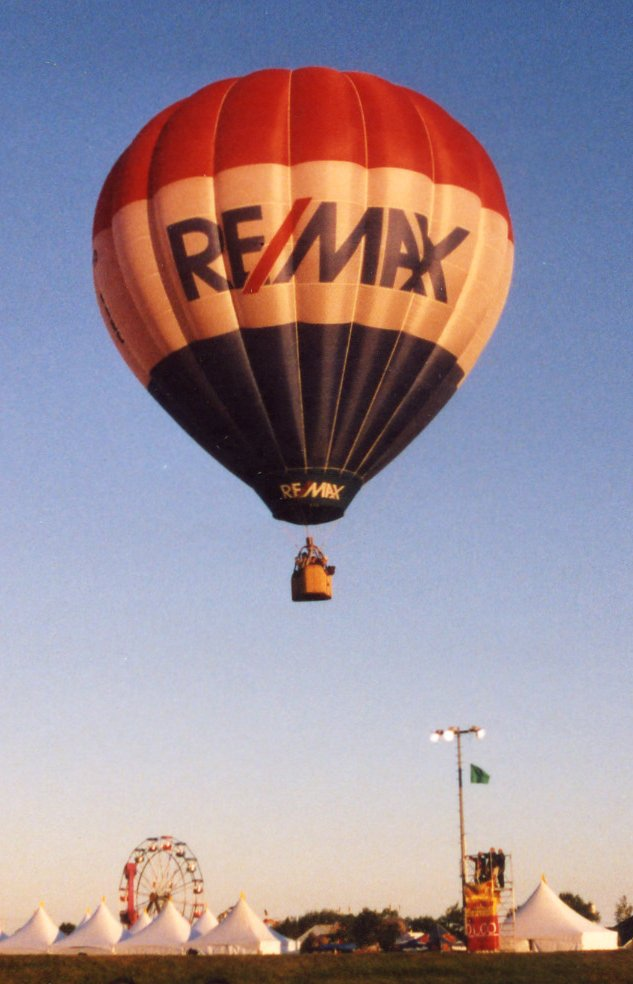
The RE/MAX hot air balloon at a balloon festival. RE/MAX introduced its hot air balloon logo in 1978 as part of its "Above the Crowd" advertising campaign.

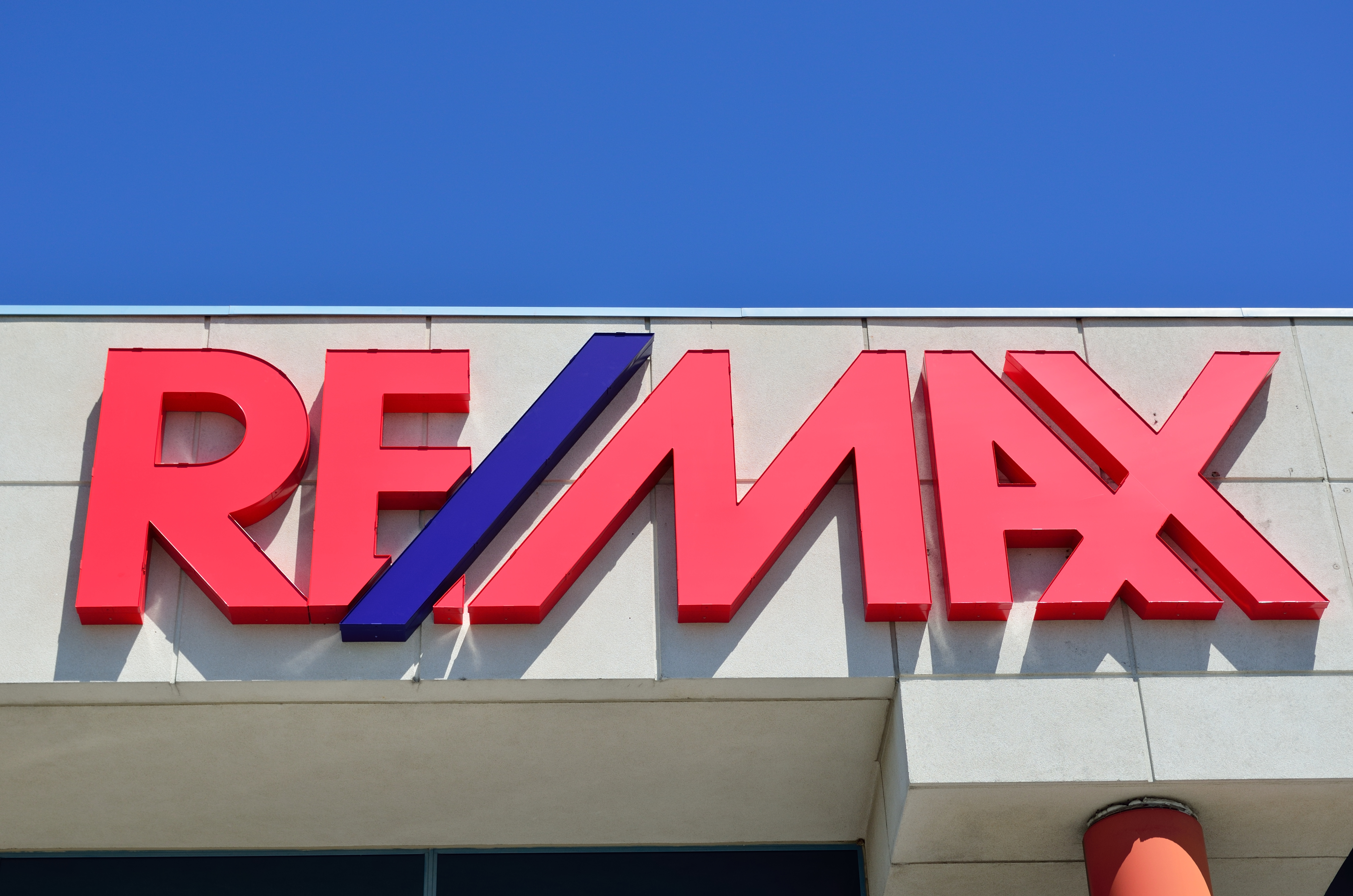
RE/MAX office in Canada

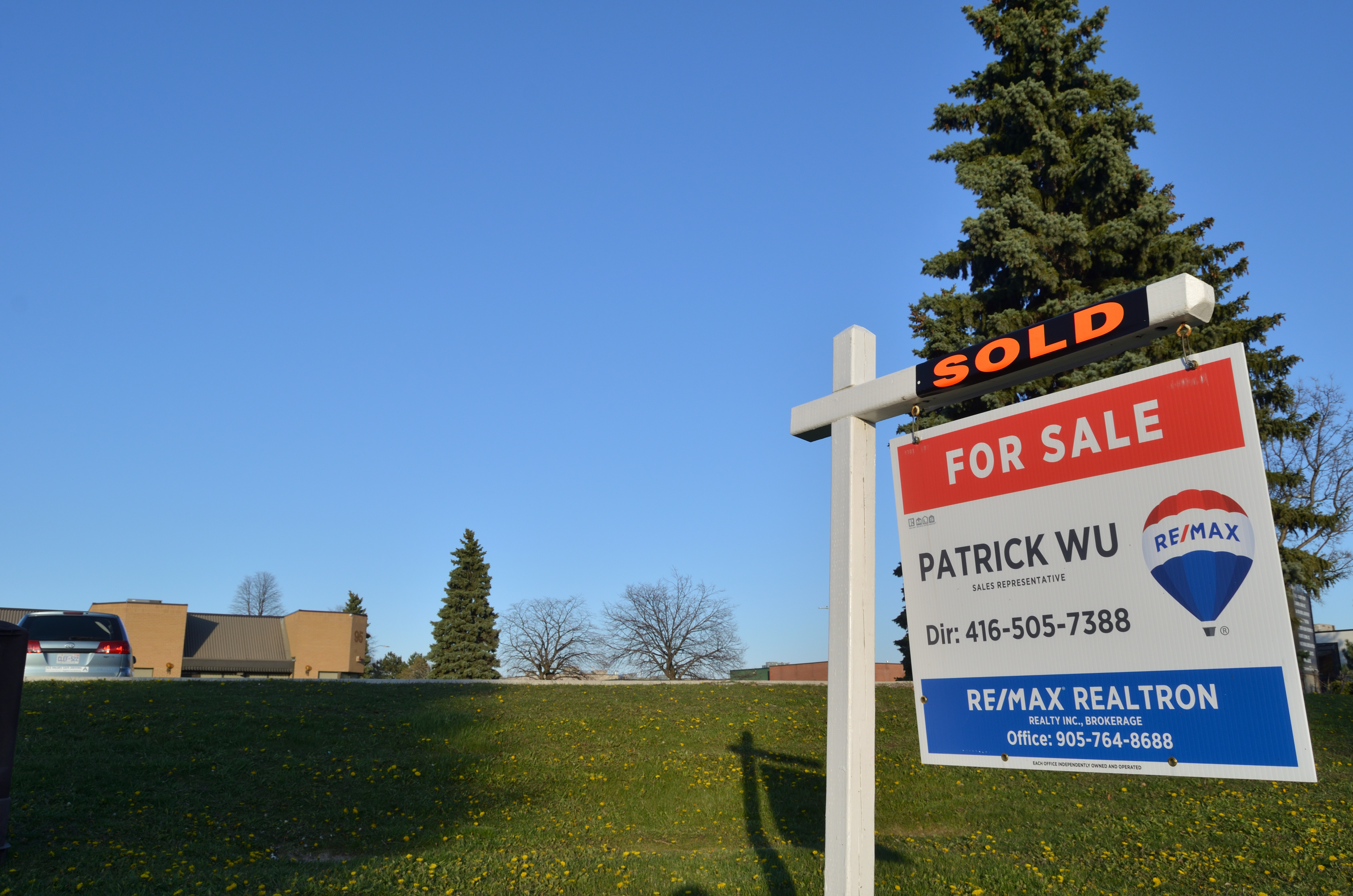
Business building listed by RE/MAX

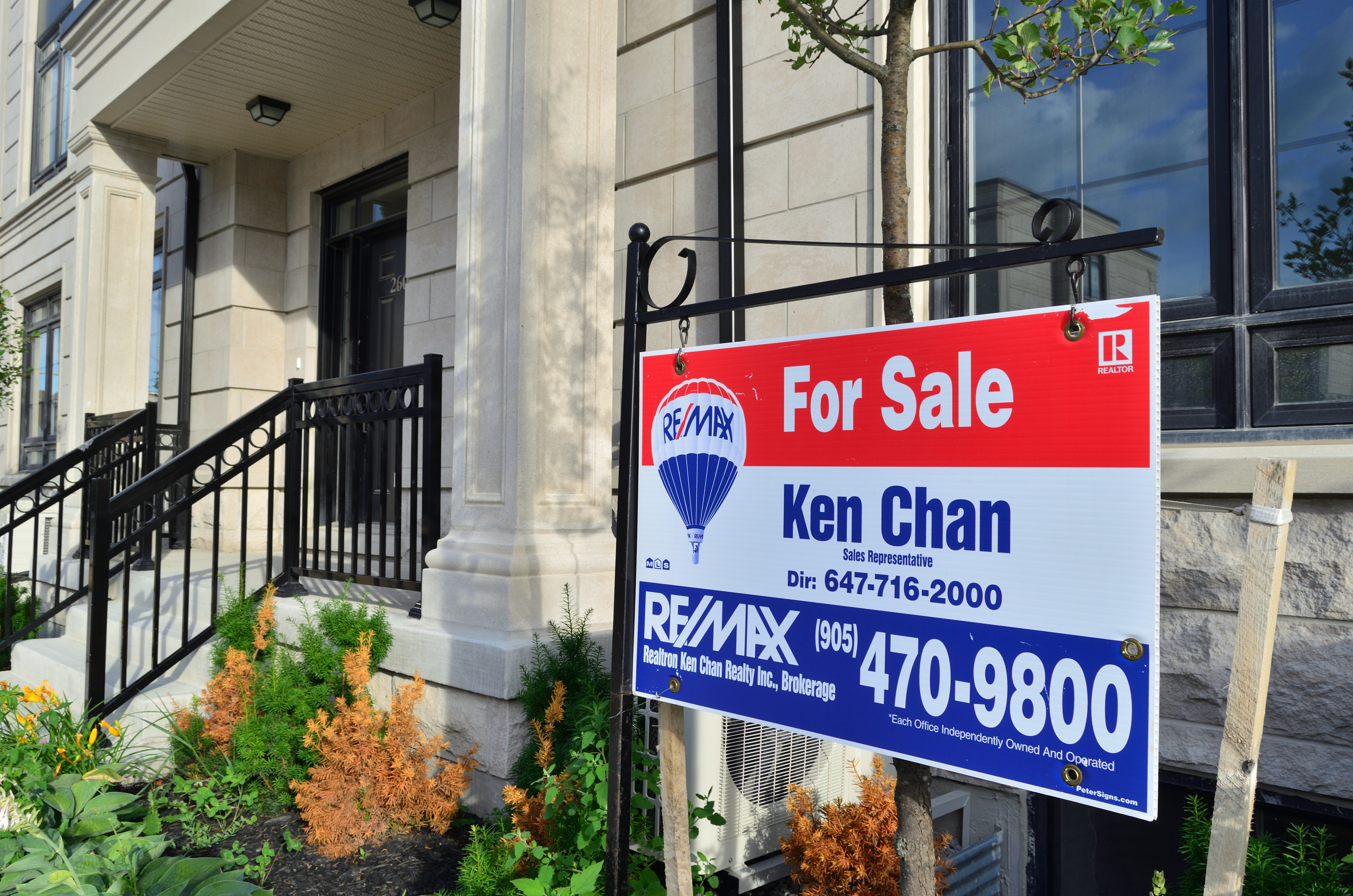
RE/MAX For Sale sign

RE/MAX (officially RE/MAX Holdings, Inc., and short for Real Estate Maximums) is an international real estate franchise operating in over 100 countries and territories that, in 2015, had over 100,000 agents in 6,800 offices.

== History ==
=== Early history: 1973–76 ===
RE/MAX was founded in 1973 by Dave Liniger and Gail Main in Denver, Colorado.

It was established with a maximum commission concept, meaning that agents would keep nearly all of their commissions and pay their broker a share of the office expenses, rather than paying their broker a share of the commission of each sale, which is common in residential real estate.

In 1975, Dennis Curtin purchased the first RE/MAX franchise outside of Colorado, in Kansas City, Missouri. Growing to 100 franchises in two years, it has held an annual convention since its first one was held in Las Vegas in 1976.

=== International expansion: 1977–98 ===
It opened its first office outside the U.S. in 1977, when Don Fernie started RE/MAX South in Calgary, Alberta, Canada. Having 30 Canadian franchises by 1981, RE/MAX became the top real estate company in that country six years later.

Having made its inaugural flight at the Albuquerque Balloon Fiesta in New Mexico, the RE/MAX Hot Air Balloon—a red, white and blue hot air balloon—was introduced in 1978, becoming its official logo the following year. Expanding beyond North America with the formation of RE/MAX Europe in 1994, it also began operating in Germany, Italy, Spain, and South Africa.

In November 1994, RE/MAX Satellite Network was launched in the US as a sales training system for real estate. Later renamed RE/MAX University, it debuted at the NAR Convention in Anaheim, California, and offered training, professional designation courses, and company news.

In 1998, two years after his company expanded into Australia and New Zealand, Liniger attempted the first manned balloon flight around the world in a stratospheric gas balloon. The flight was canceled due to design and weather problems.

=== Online expansion and IPO: 2006–present ===
In 2006, three years before it was reported that its franchises were present in 70 countries, RE/MAX began to list all U.S. homes for sale on its website, including homes being sold by competitors. By 2011, the company already had more than 6,000 franchises.

In April 2010, the Obama administration announced the "Home Affordable Foreclosure Alternatives" (HAFA) program. Leaders from the U.S. Treasury Department and the Bank of America detailed the initiative while participating in a live national broadcast held at RE/MAX headquarters.

In 2013, UN Special Rapporteur Richard Falk released a report which alleged that real estate groups, such as RE/MAX, found to promote or sell properties in Israeli settlements may be held liable for complicity in the crime of promoting settlement activity in occupied territory. In 2015, RE/MAX Israel was still selling properties in 18 different Israeli settlements in the occupied Palestinian territories.

With over 15,000 agents in Europe, the company expanded into China by opening an office in Beijing.

In November 2015, two years after its first IPO raised $220 million, RE/MAX Holdings Inc completed its second offering of approximately $185 million, holding a 58.3% stake and RIHI owns 41.7% of RE/MAX LLC. Total diluted share count (public and private) as of December 31 was 30.2 million shares.

Operating in about 100 countries, RE/MAX maintained the largest corporate fleet of hot air balloons in the world (115) in 2016. Furthermore, covering Minnesota and Wisconsin, RE/MAX Results was declared its largest franchise, with 1,200 agents and an average of 20 transactions per agent.

Two years later, former president Geoff Lewis and Liniger retired after leaving their roles, with responsibilities passing to CEO Adam Contos. That same year, it was reported that he had violated the firm's ethics by lending a multimillion-dollar sum of his own personal money to Contos.

=== Acquisition by The Real Brokerage (2026) ===
In April 2026, RE/MAX Holdings announced a definitive agreement to be acquired by The Real Brokerage Inc. (NASDAQ: REAX), a technology-focused real estate brokerage, in a transaction implying an enterprise value of approximately $880 million. Under the terms, a new holding company named Real REMAX Group would be formed; RE/MAX Holdings shareholders could elect to receive either 5.152 shares of Real REMAX Group or $13.80 in cash per share (based on Real's closing price on April 24, 2026), subject to proration, with aggregate cash consideration capped between $60 million and $80 million. Real shareholders would receive one share of Real REMAX Group for each share held, and were expected to own approximately 59% of the combined company upon closing. The REMAX and Motto Mortgage brands were to continue operating independently within the group.

The transaction was not subject to a financing condition; Real secured a $550 million commitment arranged by Morgan Stanley and Apollo Global Funding to refinance RE/MAX Holdings' existing debt and fund the cash consideration.

Securityholders of both companies approved the acquisition at special meetings held on August 14, 2026. The resolution was approved by approximately 99 percent of Real shareholders and 78.8 percent of RE/MAX Holdings securityholders holding common stock. The Real Brokerage completed the acquisition on August 24, 2026; the Supreme Court of British Columbia had approved the deal by August 21.

The combined company operates as Real REMAX Group, a holding company that brings together The Real Brokerage and RE/MAX Holdings, with Real's Tamir Poleg as chairman and chief executive officer and Jenna Rozenblat, formerly Real's chief operating officer, as its first president. RE/MAX Holdings chief executive Erik Carlson was to step down from that role but retain a seat on the new company's board. Shares of Real REMAX Group were to begin trading under the new name on August 25, 2026, with the ticker symbol REAX.

== Subsidiaries ==
In addition to RE/MAX LLC, RE/MAX Holdings, Inc. owns two other brands.

Motto Mortgage (Motto Franchising, LLC) is the first national mortgage brokerage franchise brand in the United States. Motto was launched by RE/MAX in 2016.

Wemlo (stylized as wemlo) is a fintech company that provides third-party mortgage loan processing services. The company was founded in early 2019 as a startup in Florida by David Rogove and Steven Gelley. RE/MAX Holdings announced its acquisition of wemlo on September 1, 2020.

== Philanthropy ==
In 1992, RE/MAX became a sponsor of Children's Miracle Network. The company hosts art auctions, organizes golf tournaments, and encourages agent fundraising activities. Collectively, all RE/MAX affiliates have raised $147 million for the Children's Miracle Network hospitals in over 20 years of sponsorship.

In 2002, the company became a sponsor of the Susan G. Komen Breast Cancer Foundation Race For The Cure events in the United States.

Local offices use hot air balloons for educational programs and non-profit organization fundraisers.

== Recognition ==
RE/MAX University has been featured in Training Magazine's Top 125 US Organizations recognizing employee development.

== See also ==
- RE/MAX Field
