= Woody's Chicago Style =

American fast food chain

- Type: Private
- Industry: Franchise Food Service
- Founded: 1987
- Headquarters: Lakewood, Colorado
- Key people: Kristin K. Meyer, Co-Founder, CEO & President
- Products: Retail - Chicago Style Sandwiches

Woody's Chicago Style is a franchise hot dog company based in the Denver, Colorado, area, serving Chicago-style hot dogs.

Woody's was started by the Meyer family in 1987 in Honolulu, Hawaii, as a special events concession company. The family of five would do various events ranging from "Family Sunday" at the Bishop Museum to Super Bowl Sunday at the home of known public figures, catering event at the famous Magnum, P.I. house and UH football games, including the Pro Bowl at Aloha Stadium.

Since their inception, Woody's has constantly worked on doing more with less. In the early 1990s, Woody's started a few regular locations around the island. These locations included the Bishop Museum, Dole Food Company, Dole Pineapple Cannery, Pay-N-Pak, Scofield, Hickam, Pearl Harbor, Camp Smith, Tripler Hospital, Hawaii Maritime Museum, Waikiki and Royal Hawaiian Shopping Center. Within a few years, the blossoming relationship with Pay n Pac's Home Improvement Warehouse allowed Woody's the opportunity to open a concession at the newest hardware concept, Eagle Hardware & Garden.

Within a year, Eagle offered Woody's the rights to open franchises in new stores in Colorado, California, Nevada and Arizona. Hawaii is still remembered as one of Woody's most recognized market.

In 1998, Eagle Hardware was purchased by the hardware mega-giant Lowe's. After the purchase, Lowe's approached Woody's about providing service to as many of their stores as possible. Locations opened from Hawaii to North Carolina.

Woody's transitioned their name upon their growth on the Mainland to Woody's Chicago Style and the corporate office was then moved in 2000 to Morrison Colorado and then finally to their own facility in 2009 to Lakewood, Colorado.

Woody's has had a drastic decline in franchised locations in the last five years due to the economic recession. Poor leadership can also be considered a contributing factor. In an email sent to a former franchisee following their declared bankruptcy in 2005 co-founder Coe D. Meyer stated "your foolish people to think you can just walk away from a franchisee commitment with no recourse" while later saying "I suggest you retain an attorney as you are going to need one" after earlier threatening wage garnishment. In a 2002 article Coe D. Meyer said average pre-tax revenue of their hot dog stands could reach "$150,000 a year" then continued to mention one that would be reaching "$300,000 that year" as well.

In 2018, nearly all of their locations are closed, peaking at 86 after stating on their website Lowe's "awarded 300 to developing stores in the west" in the early 2000s.
