= Noodles & Company =

Colorado-based fast-casual restaurant chain featuring noodle dishes

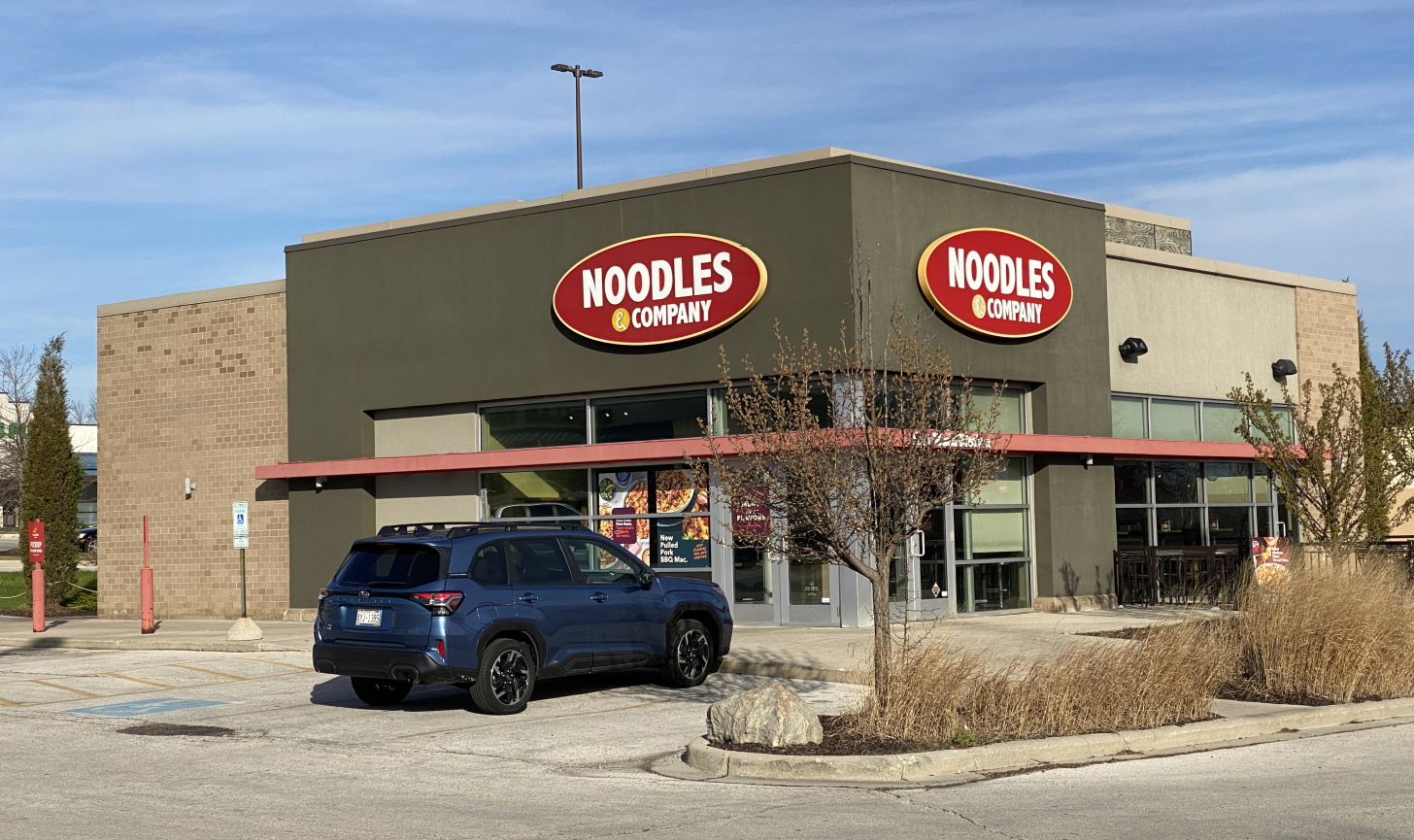
- Location in Sheboygan, Wisconsin
- Company type: Public
- Traded as: Nasdaq: NDLS (Class A); Russell 2000 Index component
- Industry: Fast Casual
- Founded: 1995; 31 years ago in Cherry Creek, Denver, Colorado
- Founder: Aaron Kennedy
- Headquarters: Broomfield, Colorado, U.S.
- Number of locations: 448
- Area served: United States
- Key people: Dave Boennighausen (CEO)
- Products: Pasta; Salads; Soups; Appetizers & Other food products
- Revenue: ▲US$475.16 million (FY Ended 12/28/2021)
- Operating income: ▲US$5.82 million (FY Ended 12/28/2021)
- Net income: ▲US$3.66 million (FY Ended 12/28/2021)
- Total assets: ▼US$341.46 million (FY Ended 12/28/2021)
- Total equity: ▲US$37.63 million (FY Ended 12/28/2021)
- Number of employees: ~8,000 (As of Dec. 28, 2021)
- Website: www.noodles.com

Noodles & Company is an American fast-casual restaurant that offers international and American noodle dishes in addition to soups and salads. Noodles & Company was founded in 1995 by Aaron Kennedy and is headquartered in Broomfield, Colorado. The company went public in 2013 and recorded a $457 million revenue in 2017. In mid-2022, there were 458 Noodles & Company locations across 31 states.

== History ==
=== Origins ===
The idea for Noodles & Company was conceived by former Pepsi marketing executive Aaron Kennedy, after eating at Mamie's Asian Noodle Shop in Greenwich Village, New York. He felt there were not enough restaurants that served noodle dishes, which are a staple for many international foods. Kennedy started developing recipes out of his mother-in-law's kitchen with the future COO, Joe Serafin, and head chef, Ross Kamens, in 1994.

Kennedy raised $72,000 ($158,571 in 2025 dollars) in personal funds and $200,000 ($434,441 in 2025 dollars) in investments from 24 friends and family members. The first Noodles & Company was opened in October 1995, in the Cherry Creek neighborhood of Denver, Colorado. Kennedy was joined by partner and real estate developer Tom Weigand, whom he had met at Augustana College. They opened a second location in Madison, Wisconsin, the following March.

=== Early history ===
In the first three months, Noodles & Company lost $42,000 ($86,219 in 2025 dollars), and almost went out of business in 1996 after a reporter with the Wisconsin State Journal published a negative review. The reviewer said Noodles & Company was "a killer idea" but "criticized nearly every dish he'd tried". The Denver Post and other newspapers had published similar reviews. In response, Kennedy started a "Redefine Noodles & Company" campaign "to redefine and refine nearly every aspect of the operation".

In mid-1996, the management team went to Chicago to observe other noodle restaurants and, the night of their return, the basement flooded at the Madison location. The next day, Kennedy made a list of 15 areas for improvement. Rocky Mountain News said: "the team completely revamped the Noodles concept, overhauling the menu, the prices, the decor and more. It worked." The restaurant implemented a warmer color scheme. Steam tables to keep food warm were replaced with saute lines to cook each dish as it is ordered. Two new managers were hired and an executive chef re-worked the menu. According to Inc. Magazine, within sixty days "the food had improved dramatically".

=== Growth ===
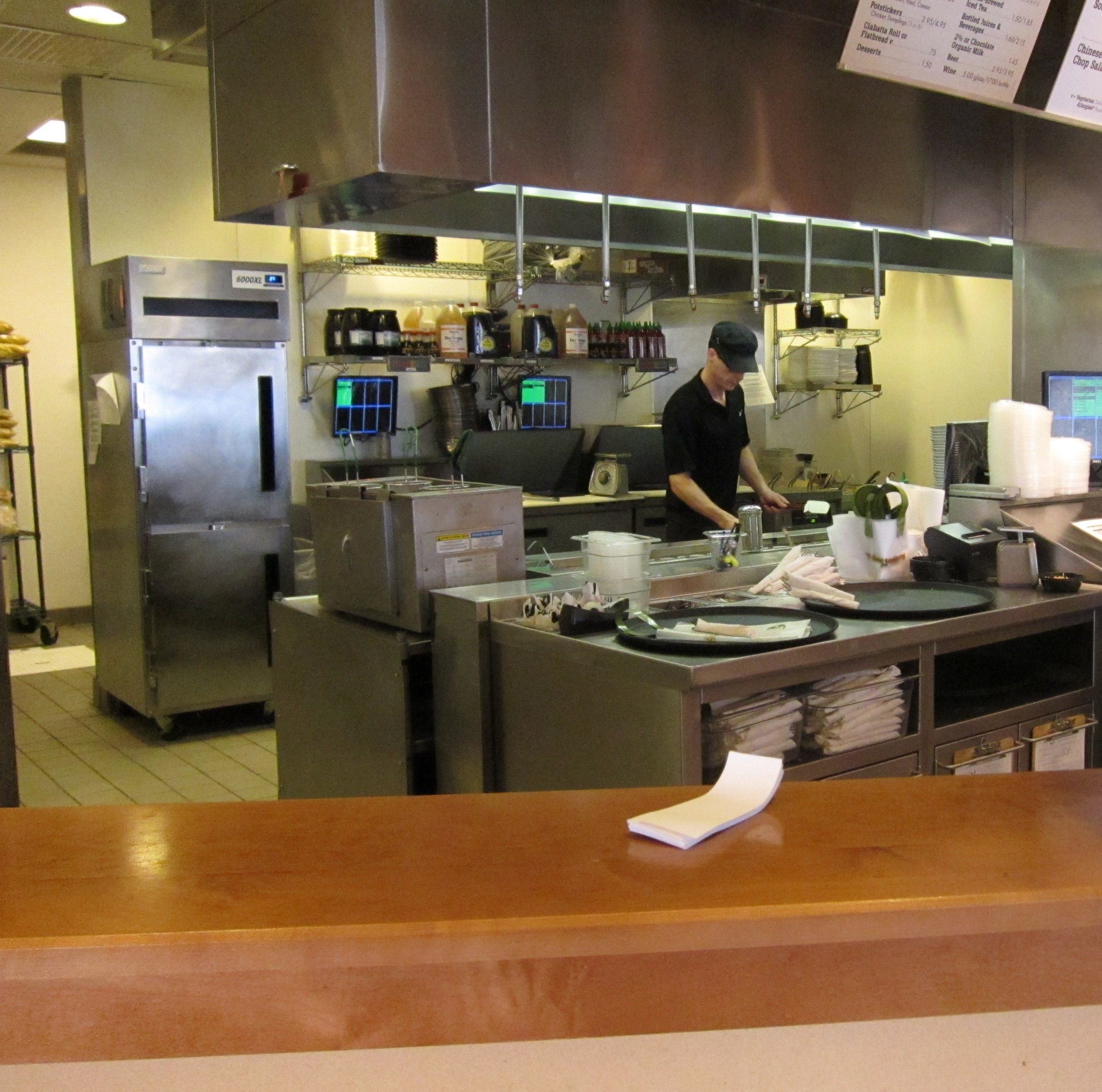
View of the saute line from the customer counter at a Noodles & Company restaurant (2010)

From 1996 to 2000, Noodles & Company's revenues grew from $330,000 ($677,435 in 2025 dollars) to $13 million ($24.3 million in 2025 dollars). Local food critics in many cities began naming Noodles & Company as the best fast-food restaurant in the city, and it was frequently listed as a "company to watch". It won a Hot Concept! award from Nation's Restaurant News. $1 million ($1.98 million in 2025 dollars) in stock was sold in 1998, which was followed by a $2.5 million ($4.94 million in 2025 dollars) round of funding and a $5 million round in 2000. ($9.35 million in 2025 dollars)

The restaurant had 37 locations in 2002, 65 in 2003, and 142 by 2007. The company started franchising in 2003 and by 2007, 22 of its stores were franchises. The restaurants were redesigned in 2004 with lighter colors, new packaging, a greater emphasis on carryout orders and a floorplan that emphasized an open kitchen, where the saute line was visible to customers.

According to Rocky Mountain News, the company was growing "so fast that it has had to move every two years". In 2006, its headquarters were moved from Boulder to Broomfield, Colorado. The company's founder, Aaron Kennedy, stepped down from his position as CEO that same year and was replaced by Kevin Reddy. The number of Noodles & Company locations grew threefold from the beginning of the 2008 financial crisis to 2013, reaching 339 locations.

=== Recent history ===
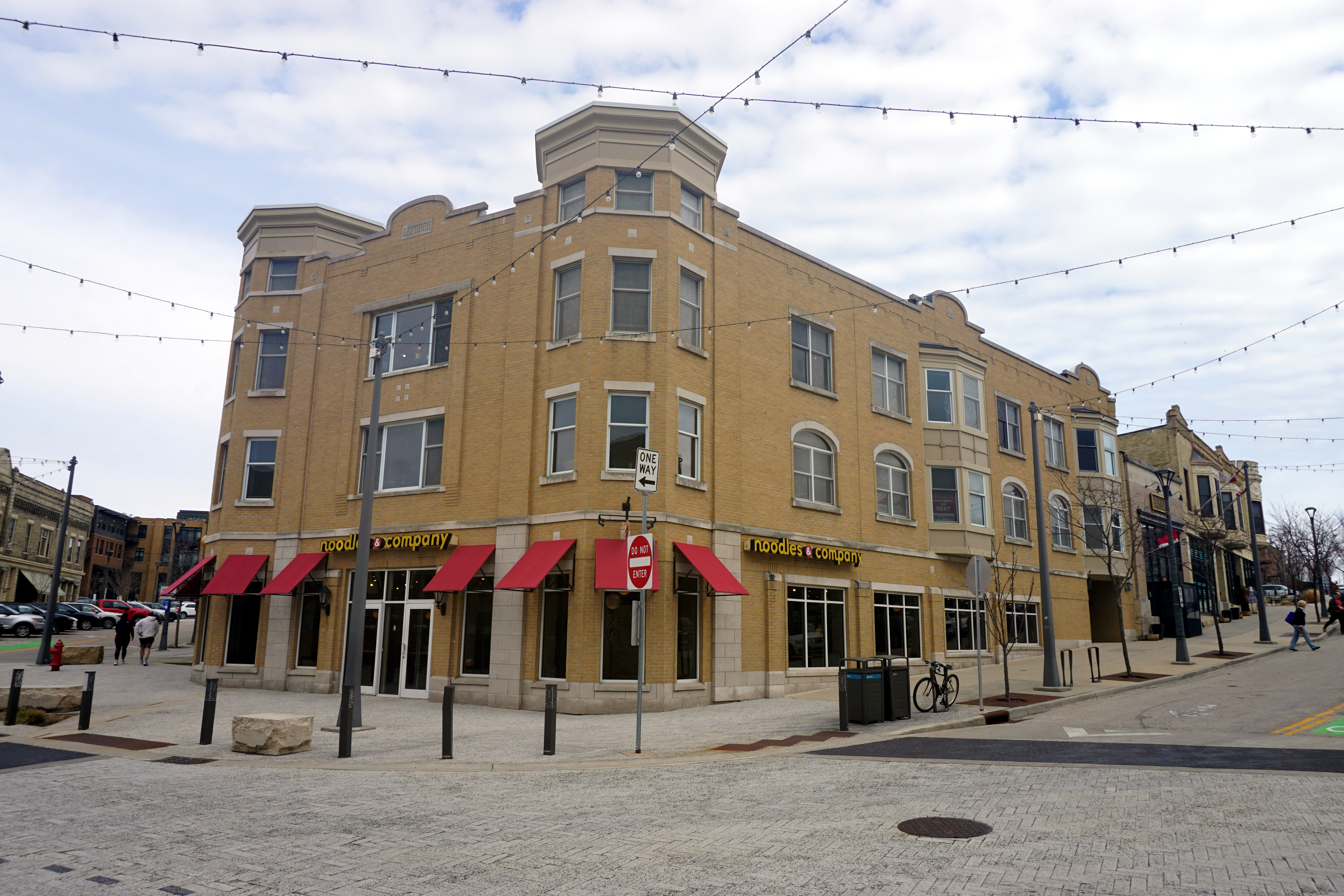
Location in Wauwatosa, Wisconsin (2024)

In 2010, a majority interest in Noodles & Company was acquired by an investment group led by Catterton Partners. In January 2013, bankers told the Financial Times that Noodles & Company was scouting for underwriters for an initial public offering (IPO). Two months later, the intent for a public offering was confirmed with a filing with the U.S. Securities and Exchange Commission for a sale of $75 million in stock on NASDAQ OMX Group's NASDAQ stock exchange. Around this time, the company had reached 339 locations, 51 of which were franchises, and $300.4 million in revenues. Within a day following Noodles & Company's (ticker symbol: NDLS) IPO on June 27, the stock price doubled. Fast Company and The Daily Beast called it "the hottest IPO of the year" and compared it to Chipotle's IPO.

On November 16, 2015, Noodles & Company announced that it had pulled out of Central Texas, closing all five of its locations in the Austin area. Restaurants in a handful of other cities had closed or were planned to close within the coming weeks, including locations in Lubbock and the Washington, D.C., area, according to published reports. Ultimately, 16 locations were closed by the end of the year.

On July 25, 2016, in Alexandria, Virginia, two Noodles & Company employees refused to serve a uniformed police officer. The officer left the restaurant and reported the incident, which gained regional news coverage. The company issued an apology and terminated the employees involved in the incident.

In 2017, the company planned to close 55 underperforming restaurants, but also planned to open 14 to 17 new locations. It also launched a pilot test in the Colorado Springs and Kansas City markets. The test included a new name, Noodles World Kitchen, as well as new menu items, customizations, rapid pick-up service, and a rewards program.

In September 2025, the company announced it would consider strategic alternatives including refinancing of existing debt, refranchising or a sale of all or part of the business. Since the company began trading publicly on June 28, 2013, shares had lost over 98% of their value leading up to the announcement of the strategic review.

== Menu and restaurants ==
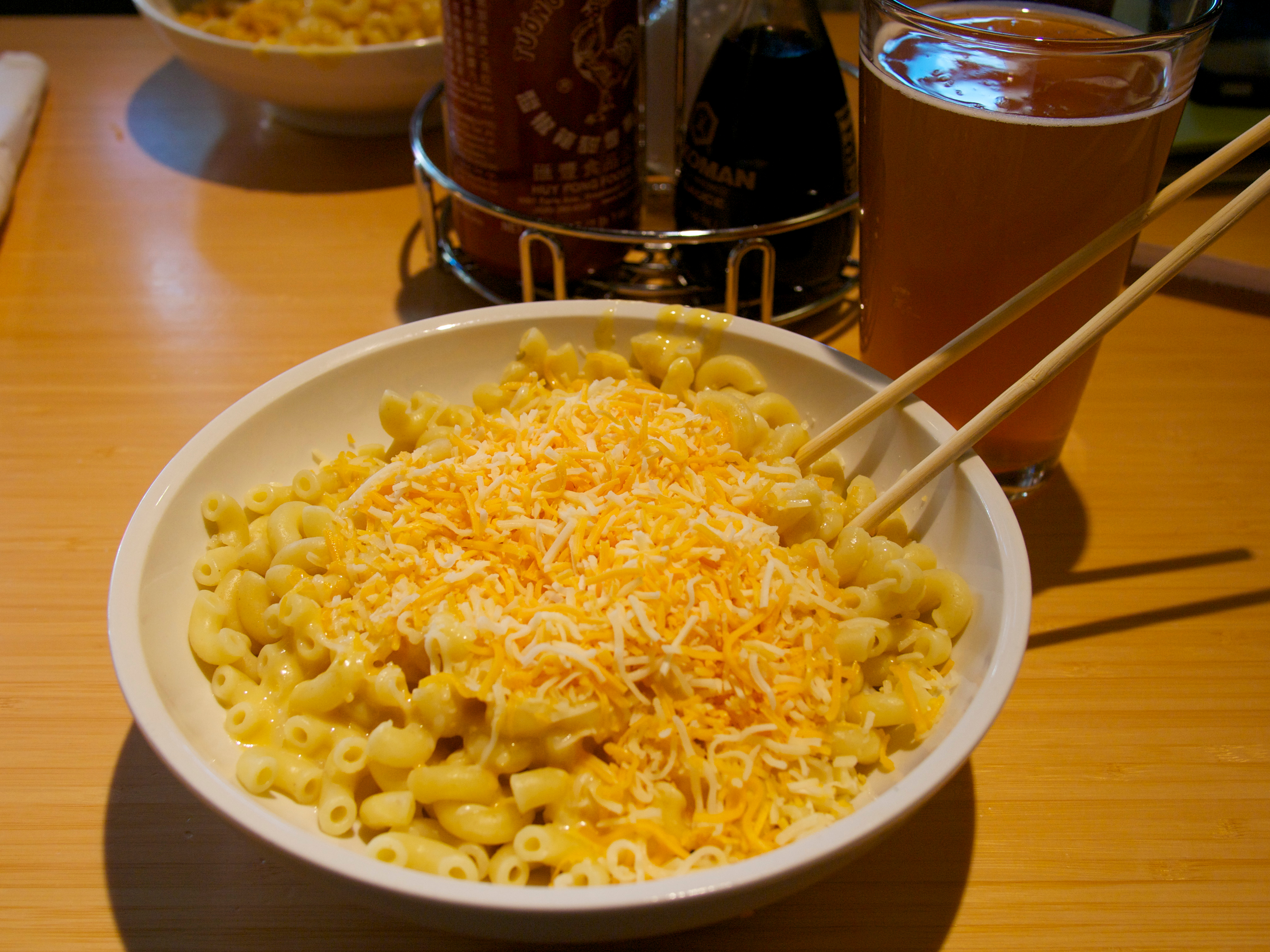
A Wisconsin macaroni and cheese from Noodles & Company

Noodles & Company offers international and American noodle dishes, as well as soups, salads, and pasta. It also sells baguettes and desserts like Rice Krispies Treats.

Originally, most pasta entrees came vegetarian with optional protein toppings such as tofu, chicken, beef or shrimp. In 2017, menu items started being marketed and featured with specific proteins, increasing the menu prices. For example, the Buffalo Chicken Mac can be ordered with another protein for nearly the same cost (depending on the protein) or no protein for a lesser cost.

Customers order at the counter and are served at their table, usually within five to seven minutes. The average check is approximately $8 per person. The restaurants use soft lighting, furniture made from recycled bamboo and have bench seating and community tables. Orders can be made online for dine-in or to-go, with the majority of locations offering curbside pickup and select locations offering drive-up lanes for pickup.

Seasonal items were first introduced to supplement the menu in 2002. Two years later, noodle-less entrees were added in response to the trend for low-carb diets. The following year it introduced a whole-grain Tuscan fettuccine. Naturally raised pork was added as a meat option in 2012. Three seasonal items and a gluten-free fusilli were added in April 2013.

In 2015, Noodles & Company debuted customizable kids' meals.

Sometime between July 2016 and October 2016, sandwiches were quietly removed from the Noodles website, with the last web snapshot that recorded the inclusion of sandwiches on the menu having occurred at the end of that July.

Although they offer gluten-free and vegan options, they warn that cross-contamination may occur.

== Advertising ==
From 1997 to 2002, Noodles & Company sponsored outdoor and print ads. By 2002 it had a $1.3 million advertising budget and began airing ads on major television networks. Afterwards, in the early 2000s, the company reduced its advertising resources, before a rebranding effort that started in 2008.

The slogan "Your World Kitchen" was introduced in 2013. The largest component of Noodles & Company's advertising is in outdoor ads like billboards, but it also invests in radio, digital media and news sites. The billboards emphasize the global cuisine. One points to a parking lot and says "Recipes imported from more countries than these cars."

== Operations and franchises ==
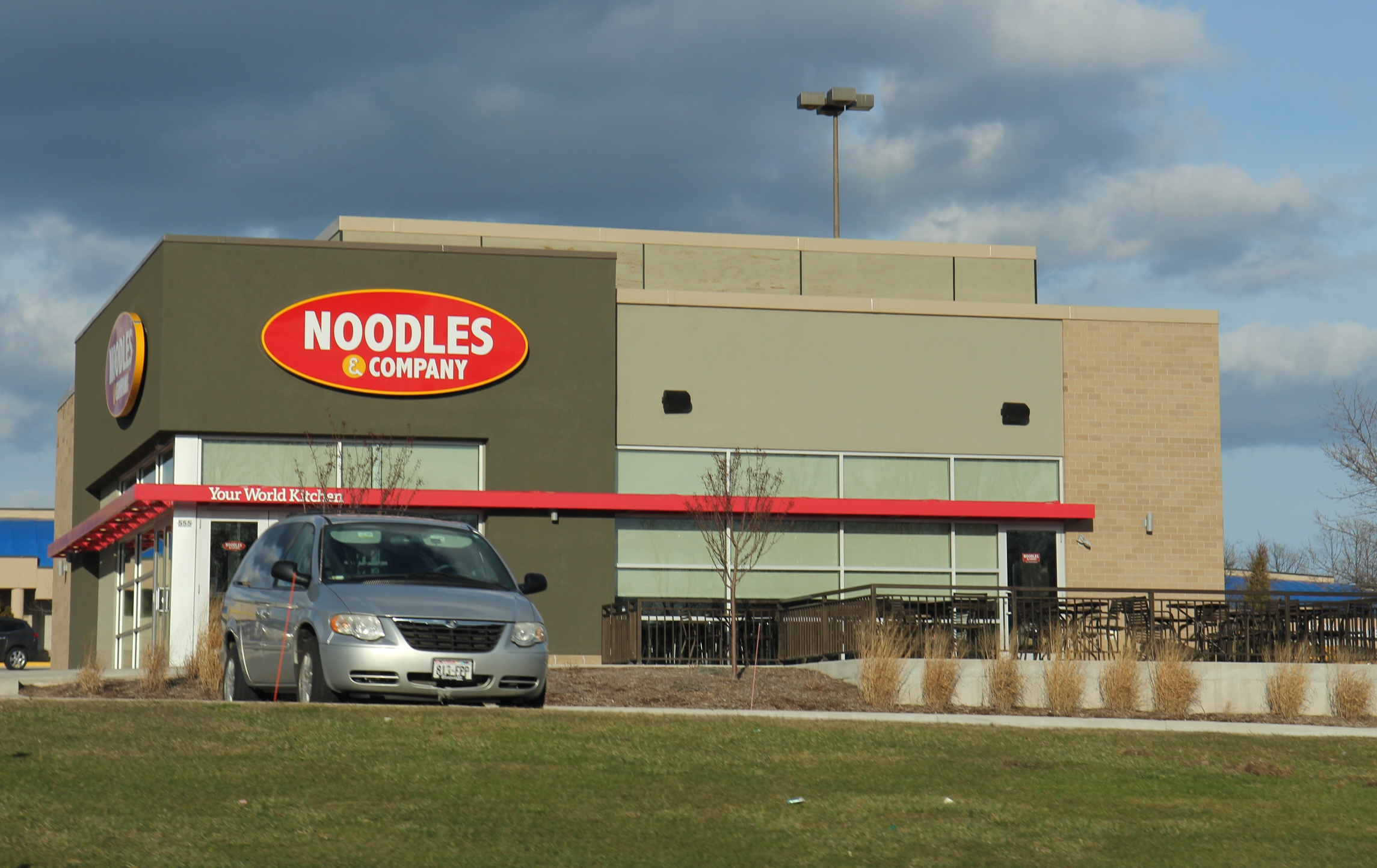
Location in Sheboygan, Wisconsin

Many Noodles & Company restaurants are owned and operated by Noodles & Company Incorporated, but some are operated in a franchise model. Franchise locations are operated by an independent franchisee that is trained by Noodles & Company and uses the same menu, pricing and branding as corporate-owned stores. As of 2010, the average Noodles & Company store generated more than $1 million in annual revenue, with a profit of 21 percent. Takeout orders account for approximately 25 percent of revenues. According to Inc. Magazine, Noodles & Company is more selective in franchise partners than other franchise-based restaurants, and has a higher ratio of corporate-owned stores than most franchising restaurants.
