= TransMontaigne =

TransMontaigne GP LLC
- Company type: Subsidiary
- Headquarters: Denver, Colorado, United States
- Parent: Morgan Stanley (2006-2014); NGL Energy (2014-2016); ArcLight Capital Partners (from 2016)

TransMontaigne Partners L.P.
- Traded as: NYSE: TLP
- Founded: February 2005; 21 years ago
- Headquarters: Denver, Colorado, United States
- Key people: Frederick Boutin (CEO)

TransMontaigne GP LLC., formerly NYSE:TMG, is an oil pipeline and terminal company based in Denver, Colorado. In 2006, it was the 269th largest company in the United States and as of 2012 it was the 17th largest privately owned company. On September 1, 2006, it became a wholly owned subsidiary of Morgan Stanley, and subsequently delisted from the New York Stock Exchange. In 2014, Morgan Stanley sold TransMontaigne to NGL Energy. In February 2016 NGL sold TransMontaigne GP LLC to ArcLight Capital Partners for $350 million in cash with Gulf TLP Holdings LLC an affiliate of ArcLight holding a controlling interest.

TransMontaigne Partners L.P. (NYSE: TLP) is a publicly traded Delaware limited partnership formed by TransMontaigne Inc. in February 2005. TransMontaigne Partners is a terminal operating and transportation company, headquartered in Denver. It has operations along the Gulf Coast, in Brownsville, Texas, along the Mississippi and Ohio Rivers and in the U.S. Midwest and East Coast. Terminals are located in Alabama, Arkansas, Florida, Georgia (U.S. state), Indiana, Kentucky, Mississippi, Missouri, North Carolina, Ohio, Oklahoma, South Carolina, Texas, and Virginia. Additional offices are located in Mount Pleasant, TX, and Roswell, GA. The current Chief executive officer is Frederick Boutin.
