= Never Summer =

Snowboard and apparel manufacturer based in Colorado

Never Summer Industries.
- Company type: Private
- Industry: Sporting goods
- Founded: 1991; 35 years ago
- Headquarters: Denver, Colorado
- Products: Snowboards, Longboards, Wakeboards, Apparel
- Number of employees: Over 70
- Website: www.neversummer.com

Never Summer Industries is a snowboard and apparel manufacturer based out of Denver, Colorado. Tim and Tracey Canaday founded Never Summer snowboards in 1991. As the company progressed, they began expanding beyond snowboarding, such as a clothing line. All Never Summer merchandise is made in Denver. In 2016 they celebrated their 25-year anniversary by filming a documentary on the culture of the company the Canaday brothers established.

== History ==
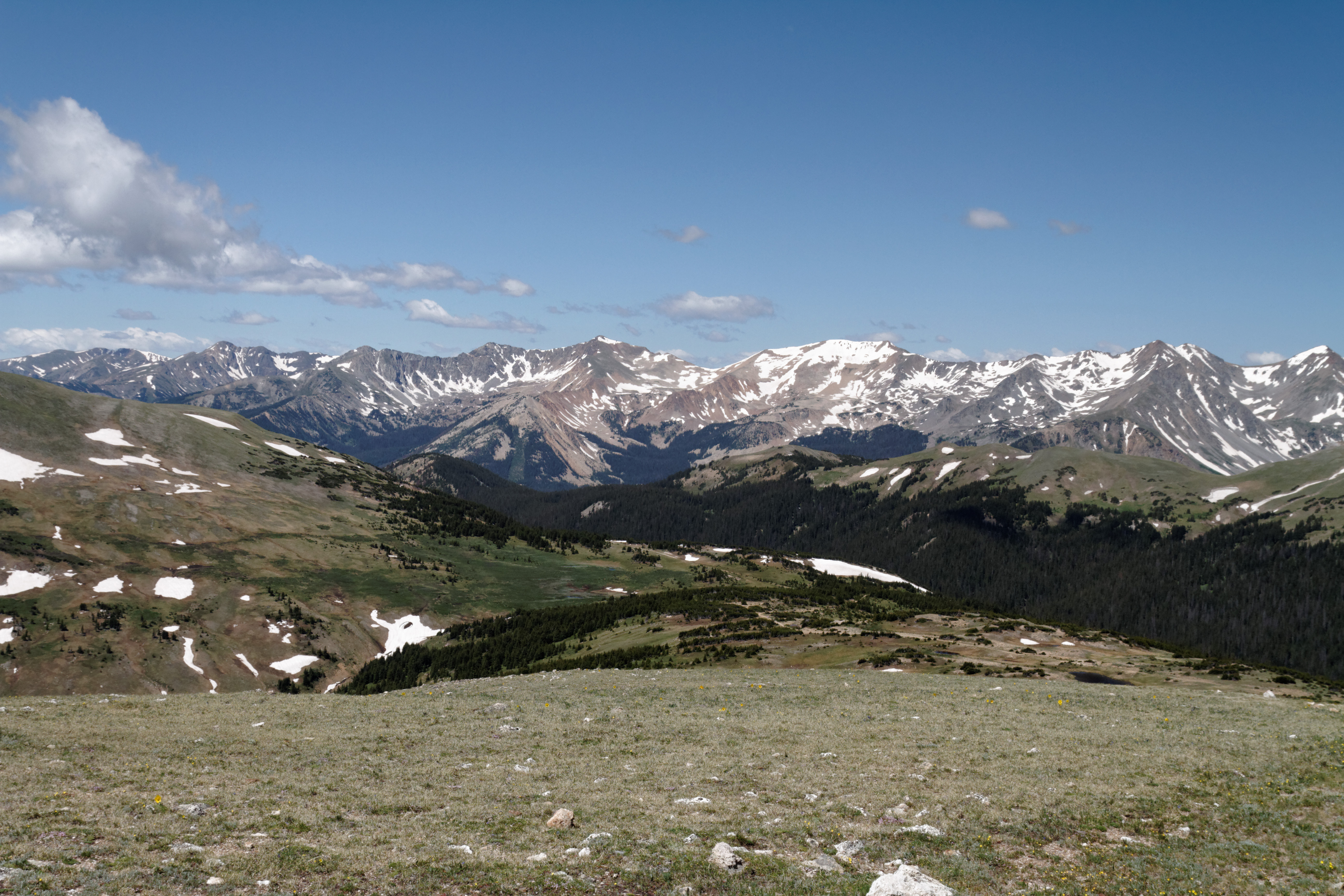
Never Summer mountain range in Colorado

It all began in 1983 when Tim and Tracey Canaday founded their first snowboard company named “Swift Snowboards" with their friend Scott Rolfs. The two brothers were originally from Fort Collins, Colorado. Tim (fourteen at the time) built snowboard shapes in his high school wood shop class. Back when the Swift company was established, the Canadays were working out of their garage. After the company was unsuccessful, the Canaday's took a break from the business and moved to California.

A few years later in 1991, snowboarding became more popular. So Tim and Tracey moved back to Colorado and renamed their company Never Summer, after the Never Summer Mountains in Colorado. They are located at the western edge of Rocky Mountain National Park, extending to Routt and Arapaho National Forest where pockets of snow last year round. In the early stages of Never Summer Industries, it was just the two of them. Tracey drove around and sold the boards out of his Honda Civic while Tim was the creator and designer. After another move to Denver in 1993 to be closer to suppliers, Never Summer took root and developed into a fully operating manufacturer and international distributor.

Never Summer is one of the innovators of P-tex sidewalls, now a common feature on the product lines of many manufacturers.

== Controversy ==
Workers in the Never Summer factory precisely hand-make all snowboards, longboards, and skis. Due to the company's high demand back in 2016, they fell extremely far behind in orders according to The Denver Post. Every day, Never Summer's workers produce 120 snowboards, 50 pairs of skis and 60 longboards. However, this was not enough to keep up with demand.
