= Saguache =

The place name "Saguache" found in the Southern Rocky Mountains of North America is pronounced /səˈwɑːtʃ/. This name derives from the Ute language noun "sawup" /səˈwʌp/ meaning "sand dunes". The Spanish language version of this name found in the San Luis Closed Basin is usually spelled "Saguache", while the English language version found north of the basin is usually spelled "Sawatch".

== Places named Saguache ==
=== United States ===
- Great Sand Dunes National Park and Preserve, Colorado, United States
- Saguache, Colorado, United States
- Saguache County, Colorado, United States
- Saguache Creek, Colorado, United States
- Saguache Peak, Colorado, United States
- Sawatch Mountains, Colorado, United States
- Sawatch Range, Colorado, United States
- Sawatch Uplift, Colorado, United States
