= Mount Sheridan (Colorado) =

Mountain in Colorado, United States

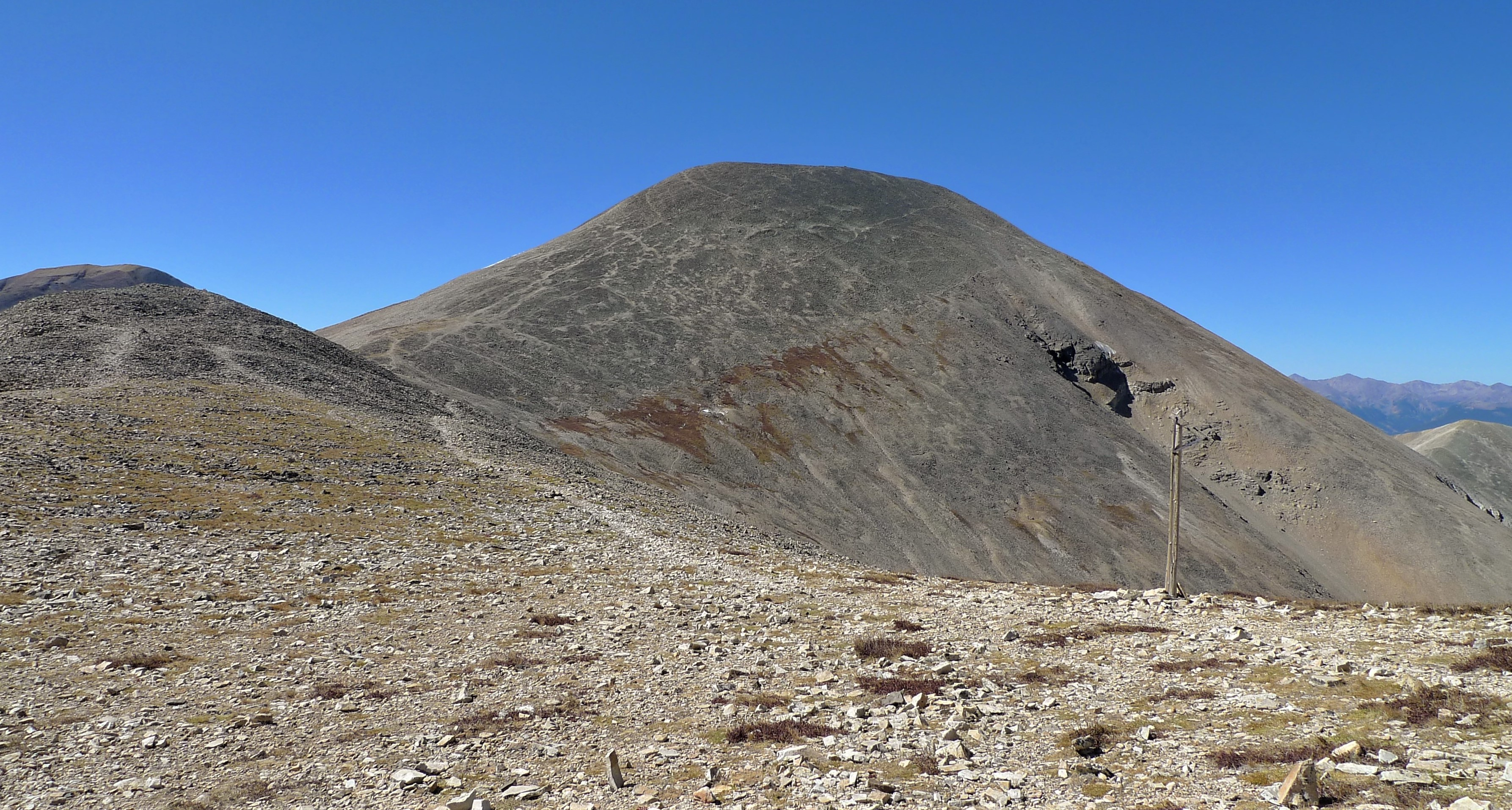
- Northeast aspect

Highest point
- Elevation: 13,748 ft (4,190 m)
- Prominence: 616 ft (188 m)
- Parent peak: Mount Sherman (14,043 ft)
- Isolation: 1.36 mi (2.19 km)
- Coordinates: 39°12′33″N 106°11′05″W

Naming
- Etymology: Philip Sheridan

Geography
- Location within Colorado Location within the United States
- Country: United States
- State: Colorado
- County: Lake / Park
- Protected area: San Isabel National Forest; Pike National Forest
- Parent range: Rocky Mountains; Mosquito Range
- Topo map: USGS Mount Sherman

Geology
- Rock age: Late Cretaceous
- Rock type: Porphyry

Climbing
- Easiest route: Hiking class 1

Mount Sheridan is a 13,748-foot (4,190 m) mountain summit on the boundary shared by Lake County and Park County, in Colorado, United States.

== Description ==
Mount Sheridan is set 18 miles east of the Continental Divide in the Mosquito Range, which is a subrange of the Rocky Mountains. It ranks as the 11th-highest peak in Park County and the 124th-highest in Colorado. The mountain is located six miles (9.7 km) southeast of the community of Leadville on land managed by San Isabel National Forest and Pike National Forest. Precipitation runoff from the mountain's west slope drains to the Arkansas River, whereas the east slope drains into the headwaters of Fourmile Creek which is a tributary of the South Fork South Platte River. Topographic relief is significant as the summit rises 1,750 feet (533 m) above Empire Amphitheater in one-half mile (0.8 km) and 1,750 feet above Fourmile Creek in one mile (1.6 km). Mount Sheridan has an officially-named subsidiary peak, "West Sheridan" (12,953 feet) approximately one mile distant.

== Etymology ==
The mountain's toponym was officially adopted by the United States Board on Geographic Names to honor General of the Army Philip Henry Sheridan (1831–1888). There is also a Mount Sheridan in Yellowstone National Park named after him.

== Climate ==
According to the Köppen climate classification system, Mount Sheridan is located in an alpine subarctic climate zone with cold, snowy winters, and cool to warm summers. Due to its altitude, it receives precipitation all year, as snow in winter and as thunderstorms in summer, with a dry period in late spring.

== Climbing ==
An ascent of the peak involves hiking 4.2 miles (6.8 km) (round-trip) with 1,728 feet (527 m) of elevation gain (4WD access), or 8.2 miles (13.2 km) with 2,508 feet (764 m) of elevation gain without 4WD. Climbers can expect afternoon rain, hail, and lightning from the seasonal monsoon in late July and August.

== Gallery ==
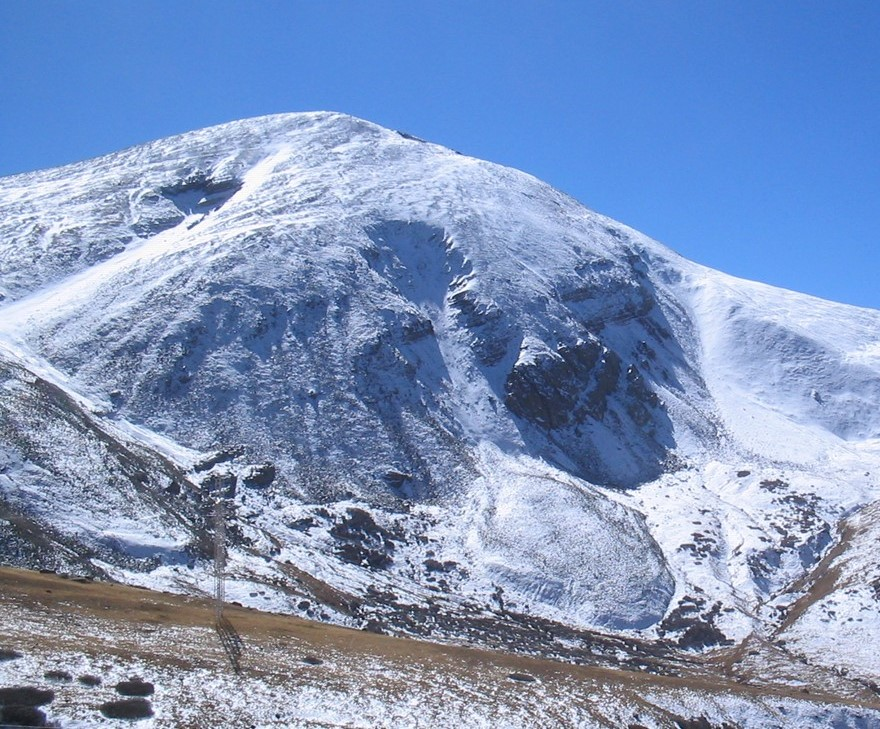
North aspect

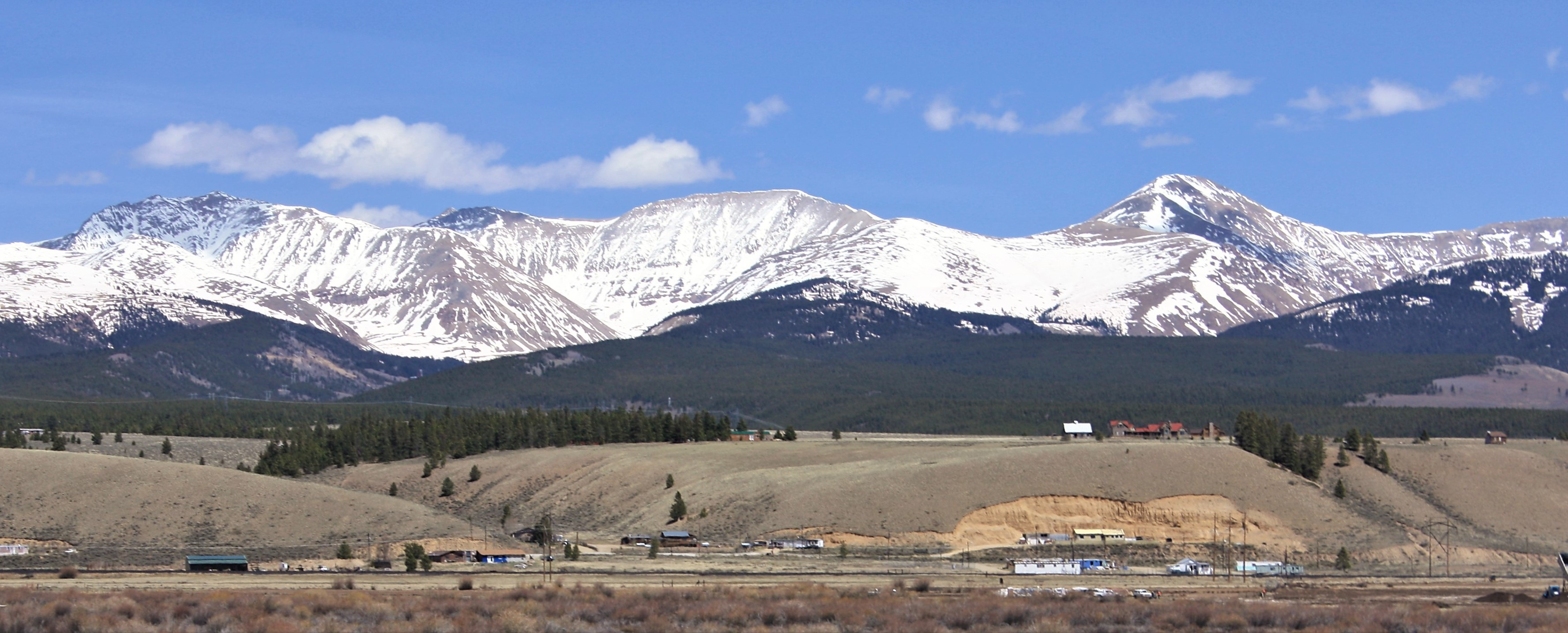
Dyer Mountain (left), Mount Sherman (center), Mount Sheridan (right). West aspect.

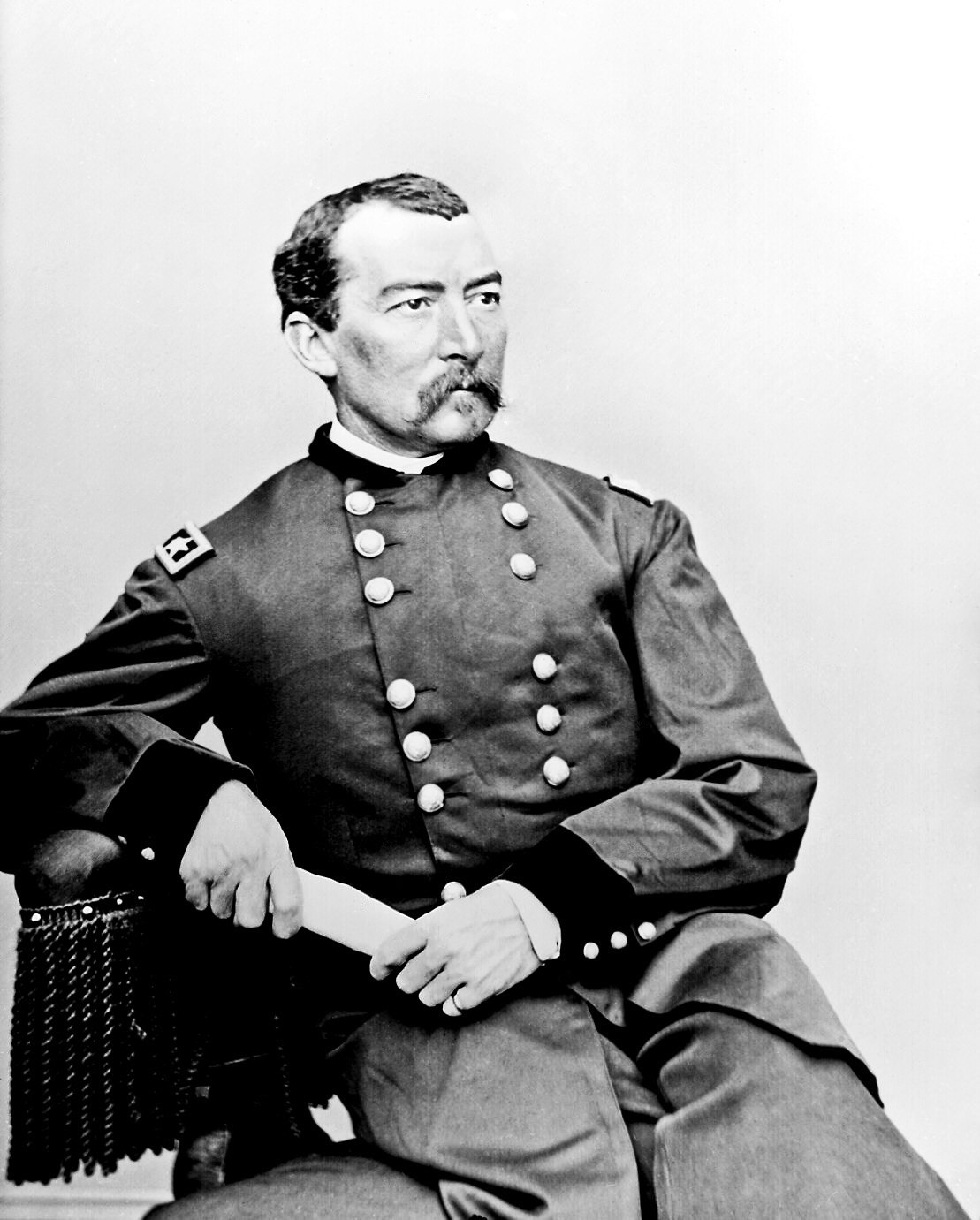
Philip Sheridan in the 1860s

== See also ==
- List of mountain peaks of Colorado
- Thirteener
