= Dyer Mountain =

Mountain in Colorado, United States

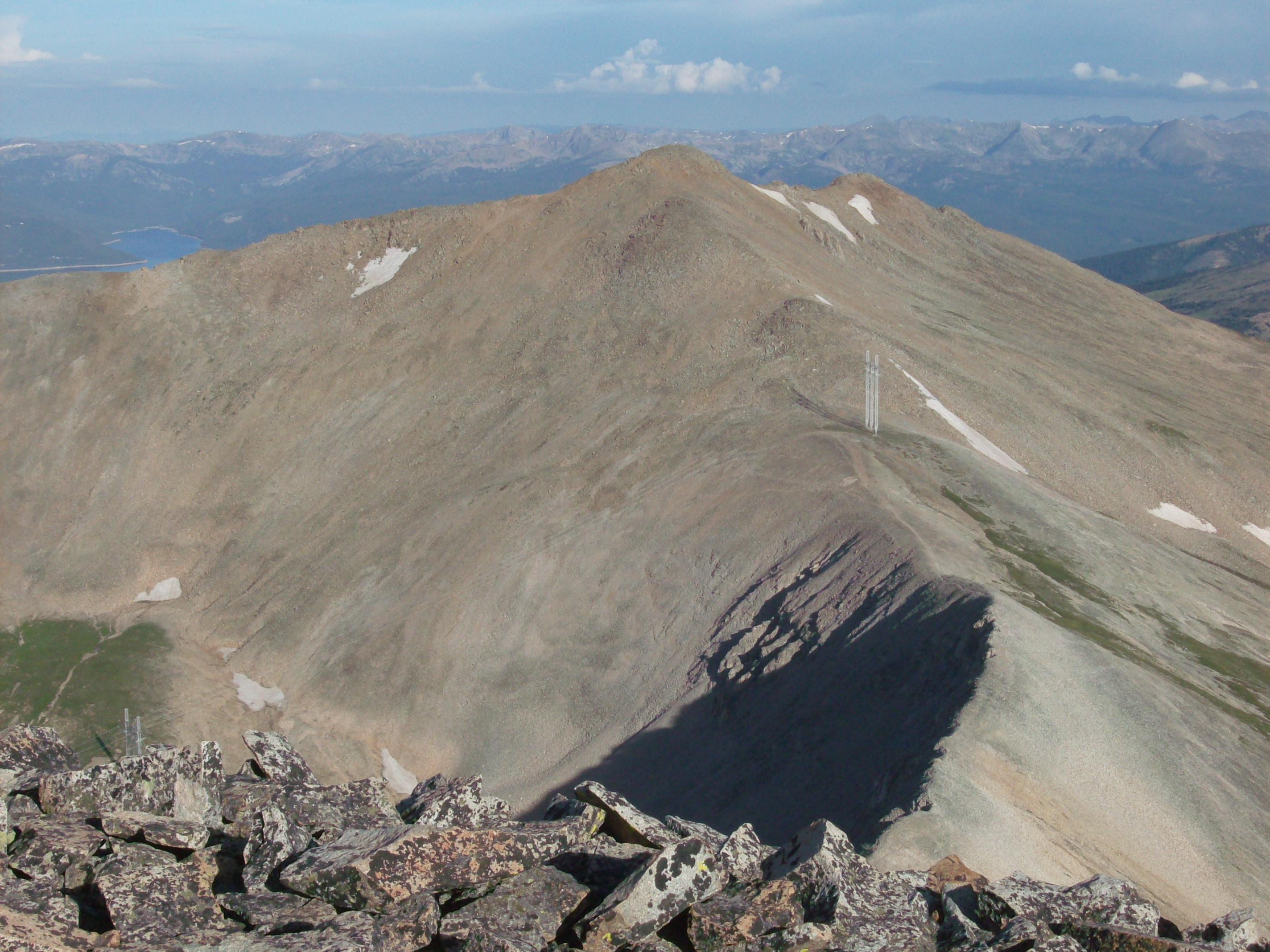
- Dyer Mountain, seen from Gemini Peak

Highest point
- Elevation: 13,862 ft (4,225 m)
- Prominence: 475 ft (145 m)
- Isolation: 0.88 mi (1.42 km)
- Coordinates: 39°14′23″N 106°11′00″W

Geography
- Location within Colorado
- Location: Lake and Park counties, Colorado, United States
- Parent range: Mosquito Range
- Topo map(s): USGS 7.5' topographic map Mount Sherman, Colorado

Climbing
- Easiest route: hike

Dyer Mountain is a mountain summit in the Mosquito Range of the Rocky Mountains of North America.

The 13,862-foot (4,225 m) thirteener is located 5.9 miles (9.5 km) east (bearing 95°) of the City of Leadville, Colorado, United States, on the drainage divide separating Lake County from Park County. The mountain was named in honor of frontier preacher John Lewis Dyer.

It is often hiked in tandem with Mount Sherman.

== See also ==
- List of Colorado mountain ranges
- List of Colorado mountain summits
  - List of Colorado fourteeners
  - List of Colorado 4000 meter prominent summits
  - List of the most prominent summits of Colorado
- List of Colorado county high points
