= Red Hill Pass (Colorado) =

Mountain pass in Colorado, USA

Coordinates: 39°16′04″N 105°57′40″W

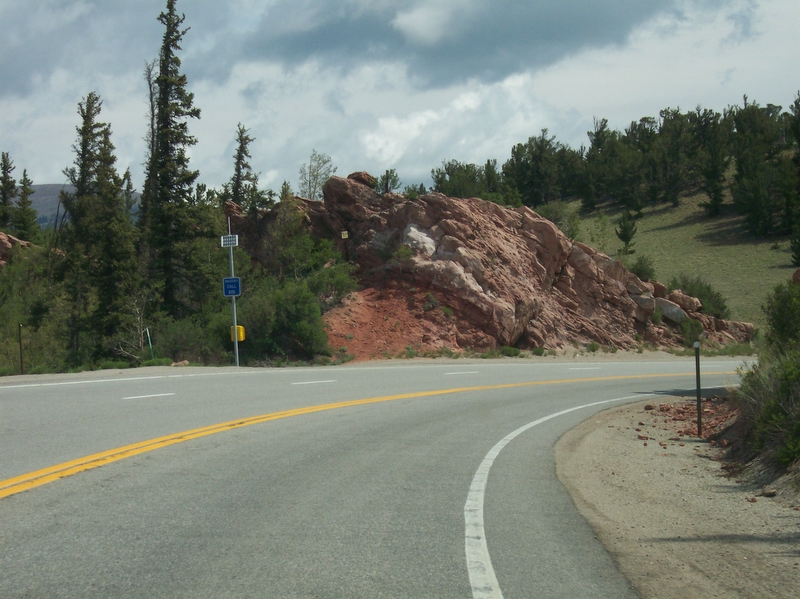
- Red Hill Pass
- Interactive map of Red Hill Pass
- Elevation: 10,031 ft (3,057 m)
- Traversed by: U.S. Highway 285

Location
- Location: Park County, Colorado, United States
- Range: Mosquito Range
- Topo map: USGS topo map

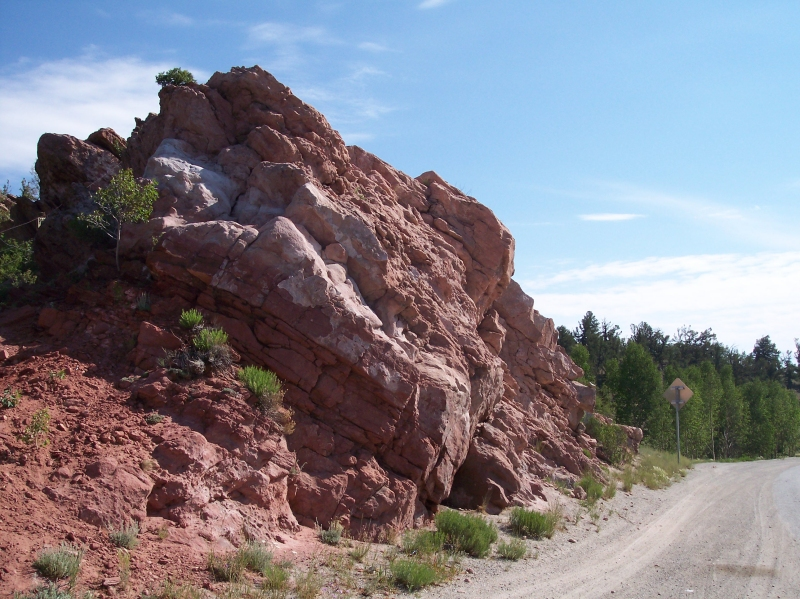
Red Hill Pass Hwy 285

Red Hill Pass (el. 10,031 ft.) is a high mountain pass in the Rocky Mountains of central Colorado in the United States.

The pass is located in the foothills of the Mosquito Range at the northern end of South Park in Park County. The pass is identified by signs from both directions at the bottom. True to its name, red hills flank both sides of the summit and the inclines, especially on the south side. It is traversed by U.S. Highway 285 approximately 6 mi (10 km) northeast of the town of Fairplay, The pass is easily traversable by most motor vehicles and rarely closes in the winter.

== See also ==
- Kenosha Pass
