= South Park (Park County, Colorado) =

Grassland flat in Park County, Colorado, US

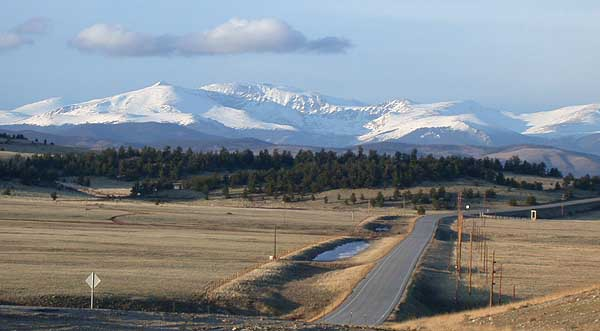
- View of South Park along U.S. Highway 285 looking eastward toward the Front Range

- Location within Colorado
- Floor elevation: 10,000 feet (3,000 m)
- Area: 1,000 square miles (2,600 km^{2})

Geography
- Coordinates: 38°58′04″N 106°02′43″W
- Interactive map of South Park

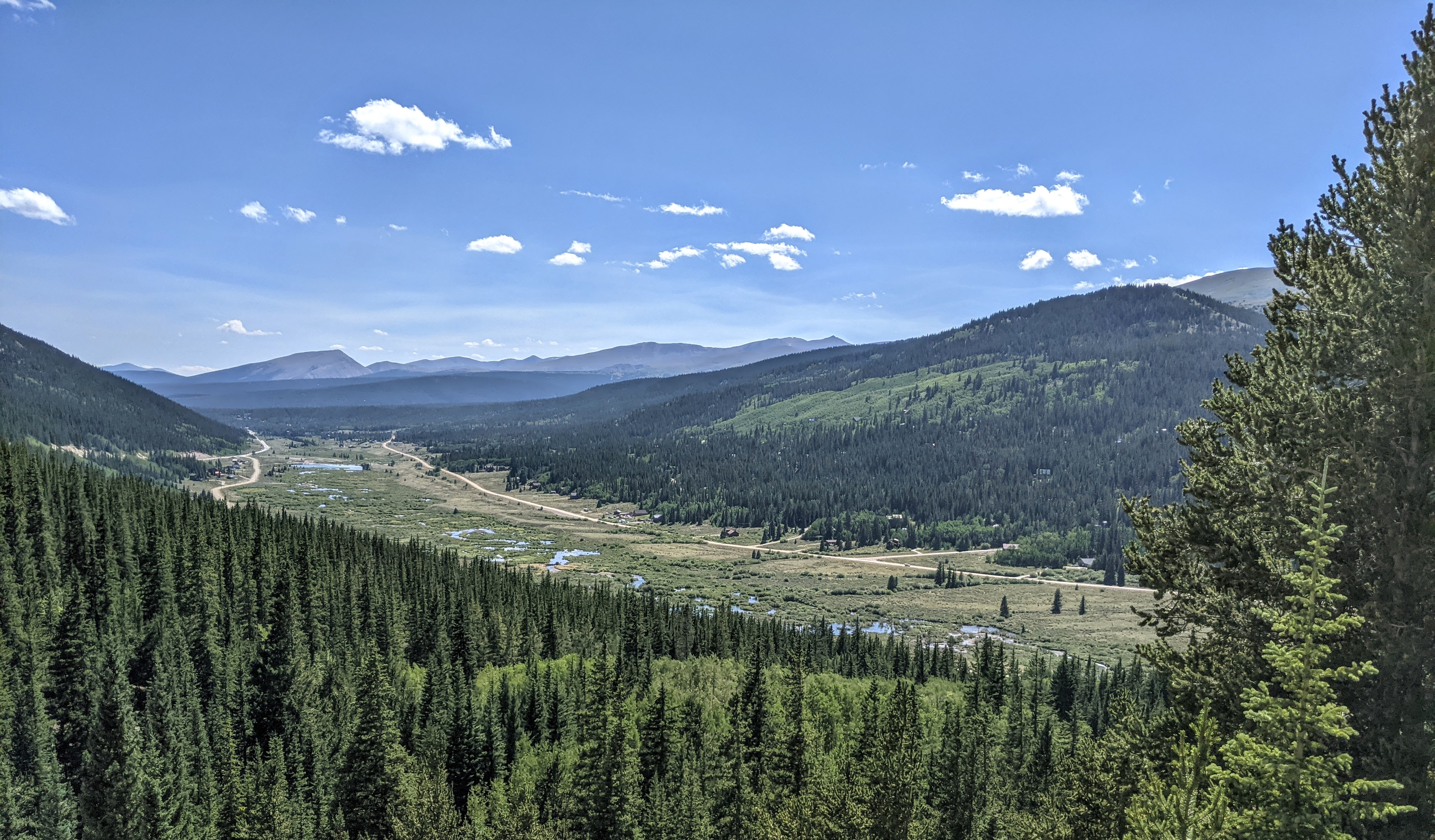
A meadow near the headwaters of the Middle Fork South Platte River below Montgomery Reservoir in South Park

South Park is a grassland flat within the basin formed by the Rocky Mountains' Mosquito and Rampart Mountain Ranges within central Colorado. This high valley ranges in elevation from approximately 9,000 to 10,000 ft (3,000 m). It encompasses approximately 1,000 square miles (2,590 km^{2} or 640,000 acres) around the headwaters of the South Platte River in Park County approximately 60 mi (100 km) southwest of Denver. It is the largest and southernmost of three similarly named high elevation basins in the Front Range of Colorado, the others being North Park and Middle Park. The largest town in the basin is Fairplay, with a population of 724.

== Geology ==
Geologically, the valley is a wide faulted syncline of sedimentary rocks, sitting between the predominantly Precambrian igneous rocks of the Front Range to the east and the Sawatch Uplift to the west. The Mosquito Range forms a high barrier along the western side of the valley. The long-extinct Thirty-Nine Mile volcanic field is located just to the southeast.

The valley is mostly underlain by Paleozoic and Mesozoic sedimentary rocks concealed by a thin layer of gravel laid down by glaciation during Pleistocene time. The underlying rocks are dipping slightly to the east. The eastern (and newer) side of the valley is underlain primarily by Pierre Shale laid down during Cretaceous time. The western (and older) side of the valley, on the west side of Red Hill, is underlain primarily by Permian and Pennsylvanian rocks. Red Hill runs through the center of the valley as a hogback ridge of tilted Cretaceous and Jurassic sedimentary rocks.

=== Gold ===
Gold mining in South Park began in 1859. Extensive placer deposits were mined along the west side of the park, and lode deposits were mined in the Mosquito Range. The extensive gravel ridges east of Fairplay are the result of dredging for gold. (see Gold mining in Colorado).

=== Petroleum ===
Although South Park contains some of the same geologic formations that yield oil and gas in the Denver Basin further east, efforts to find commercial oil and gas in South Park have so far proven unsuccessful.

=== Uranium ===
A minor amount of uranium has been mined from sandstone in South Park (see Uranium mining in Colorado).

== Transportation ==
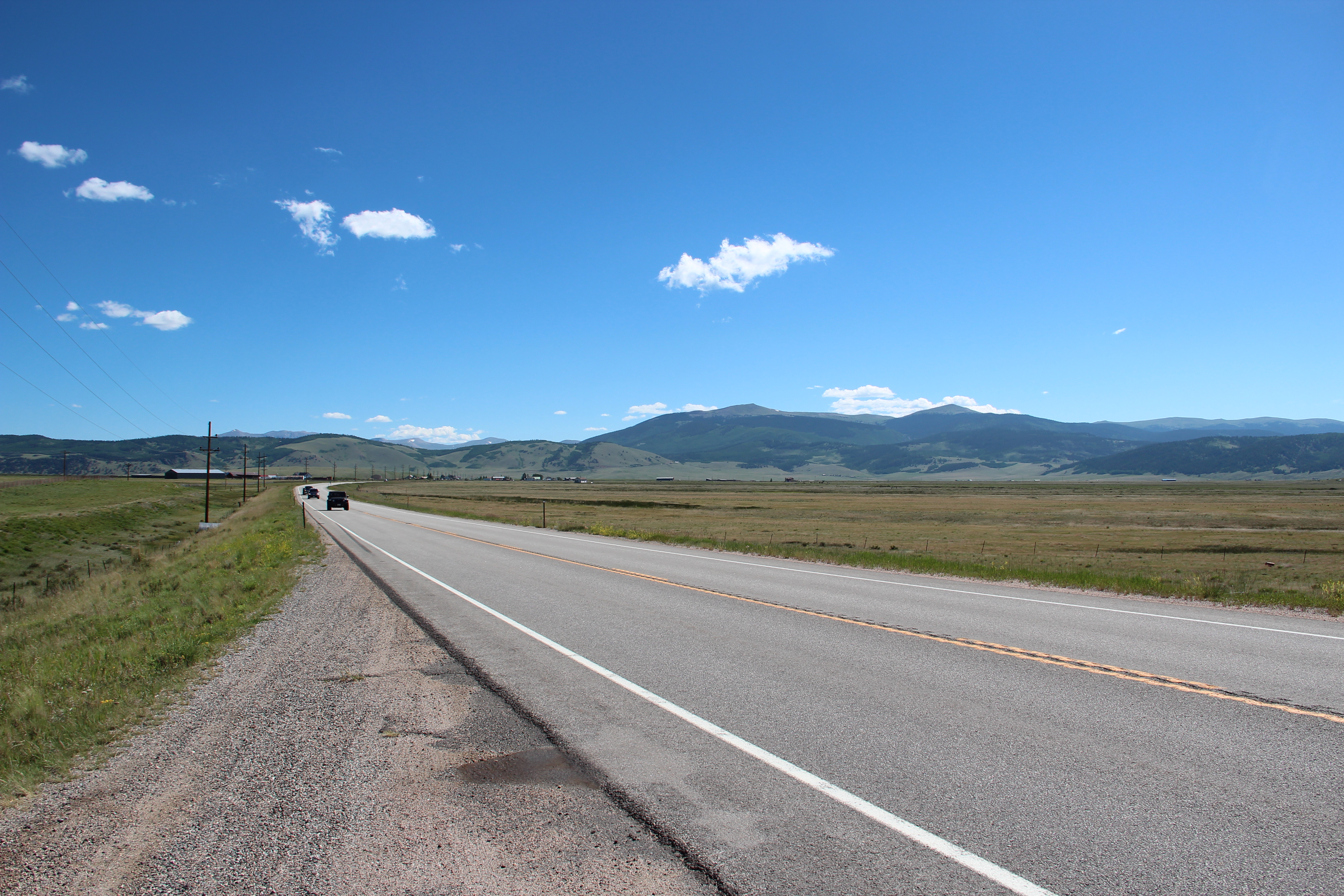
U.S. Highway 285 in South Park

The valley is traversed by several highways, including U.S. Highway 285, which enters the valley from the eastern side over the Front Range at Kenosha Pass, providing a vehicle link to Denver. The highway crosses Red Hill at Red Hill Pass. On its northern side, the valley is connected by several high mountain passes to the valley of the North Fork of the South Platte River (a tributary of the South Platte). It is also connected by CO Route 9 via Hoosier Pass to the valley to the Blue River near Breckenridge. To the west, the extremely high Mosquito Pass crosses the Mosquito Range to Leadville. (Mosquito Pass is no longer a practical transportation route, but is now a historical and recreation site.) On its southwestern side, at the southern end of the Mosquito Range, it is connected by Trout Creek Pass to the upper valley of the Arkansas River near Buena Vista. U.S. Highway 24 enters South Park from the east at Wilkerson Pass, where the highway provides vehicle access to Colorado Springs. To the very south, CO Route 9 crosses Currant Creek Pass, which marks the southern edge of the South Park region.

== History ==
Like much of the mountainous areas of Colorado, the valley was inhabited by Utes before the arrival of European settlers in the middle 19th century. However, from the 1850s onward, the area was increasingly encroached on by Southern Arapaho bands, who came to cherish it as an important buffalo range after witnessing the continued degradation of their typical hunting grounds on the plains and who repeatedly became entangled in skirmishes with the Utes over the territory. It was explored by John C. Fremont during his second expedition in 1844, at which time it was referred to as "Bayou Salade", a corruption of Spanish "Valle Salado", meaning salty valley. In 1859, the discovery of placer gold in the streams of the valley during the Colorado Gold Rush led to an influx of prospectors and miners. The town of Fairplay was founded as a more law-abiding place to live than the older, nearby town of Tarryall during this time and continued to be a center of gold, and later silver mining up through the middle 20th century. South Park City, an open-air museum outside Fairplay, provides a historical recreation of the gold rush days. The basin was connected to Denver by railroad with the extension of the Denver, South Park and Pacific Railroad over Kenosha Pass in 1879.

== In popular culture ==
Since the late 1990s, South Park has been best-known as the eponymous setting of the adult animated series South Park. Trey Parker, one of the creators of the South Park series, grew up in Conifer, about 40 miles (65 km) east of Fairplay. According to Parker and co-creator Matt Stone, the area was well-known in Colorado for supernatural tall tales, UFO conspiracies and alien abduction stories that served as partial inspiration for the series.

== See also ==
- Grass valley
