= John Lewis Dyer =

Circuit rider and Methodist minister

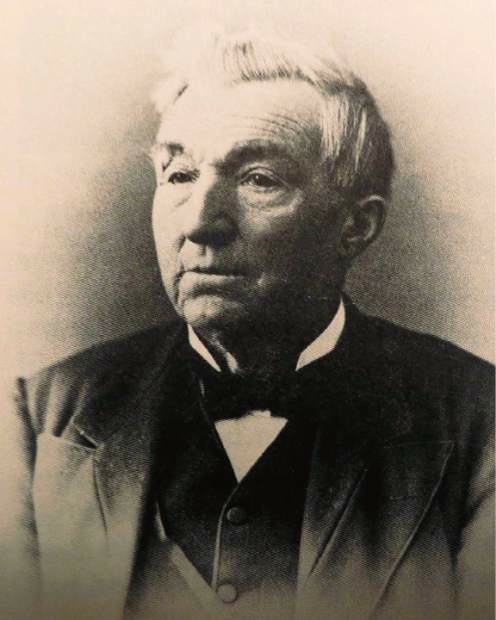
- Father Dyer
- Born: John Lewis Dyer; March 16, 1812
- Died: June 16, 1901 (aged 89)
- Other name: Father Dyer
- Occupation: Minister
- Years active: 1861—1890
- Notable work: The Snow-Shoe Itinerant

John Lewis Dyer (1812-1901) was a Methodist circuit rider who became known as "The Snowshoe Itinerant" for his preaching in the Colorado area.

== Biography ==
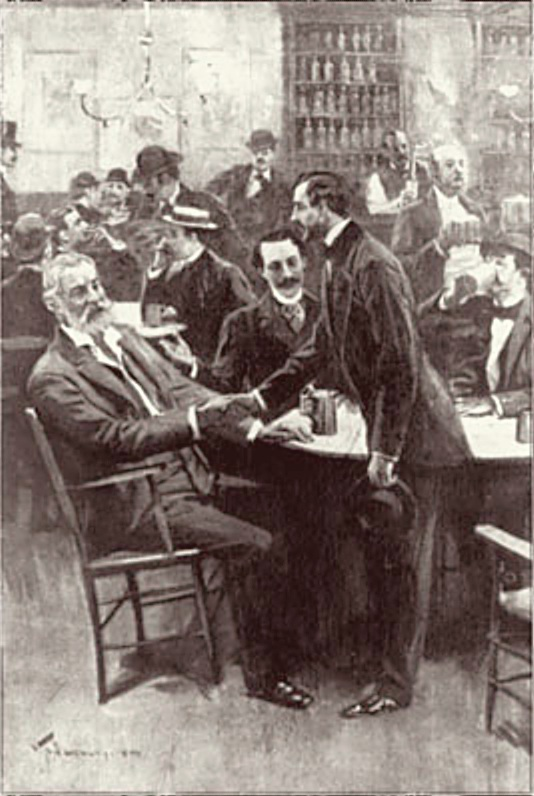
Father Dyer preached in saloons.

Dyer was born in Franklin County, Ohio, spending most his early years in Illinois. He had little formal education and in 1833, married Harriet Foster, moving his family to Wisconsin to work in the lead mines. Harriet died when she was 35, leaving Dyer a widow with their five children. After their mother-named infant daughter Harriet died soon after, Dyer chose to become a Methodist minister. He became a circuit rider, riding from town to town as he was needed for funerals, sermons, and weddings.

Dyer's circuit in Wisconsin and Minnesota covered a large area, and required travel through winter storms and extensive snow. Norwegian immigrants in Minnesota taught Dyer how to make skis to traverse the snow more efficiently.

Walking most of the way, he moved to Colorado in 1859, as he had a life-long desire to see Pikes Peak. In what are now Lake, Summit, and Park counties, he was appointed an itinerant preacher to the mining camps Dyer hiked through blizzards and dealt with wild animals to reach remote mining towns, preaching in saloons, tents and on street corners. At times, miners put gold dust in the offering plate, as most were too poor to give actual cash.

A new challenge faced Dyer in Colorado mining towns. The rough-and-tumble residents spent a much of their free time drinking and gambling in saloons. Thus Dyer felt his preaching was sorely needed. In many towns he set up churches, including one in Breckenridge that still holds services today: Dyer United Methodist Church. As he had once worked in mines, Dyer understood the hard lives of miners. Dyer's life as a minister was far from easy, and he made little money on his circuit. To make more he started carrying mail between Alma and Leadville when traveling over Mosquito Pass.

Wearing 10-foot "snowshoes" (really Norwegian skis), he would cross Mosquito Pass, which is 13,188 feet (4,020 m) high, leaving in the evening, so the snow was frozen and easier to cross. Atop Mosquito Pass are two memorials bearing his name. Dyer became quite well-known and was affectionately nicknamed "Father Dyer" despite the fact that Methodist ministers were not called "Father".

Dyer bought property in Breckenridge next to the county courthouse on French Street, and with his own money, began to build a chapel. This chapel was 50 feet (15 m) by 25 feet (7.6 m), with a ceiling that was 16 feet (4.9 m) high. On August 22, 1880, at 68, he conducted the first service to be held in a church on Colorado's Western Slope.

In 1870, Dyer married Lucinda Rankin, a widow who lived near Castle Rock. At age 73, he and Lucinda moved to Denver where he wrote and published his autobiography, The Snow-Shoe Itinerant.

In 1885, the Colorado Senate appointed Dyer as its first chaplain.

Father Dyer died in 1901 at the age of 89.

== Legacy ==
- "Father" Dyer is one of the 16 founders of the state of Colorado, thus his likeness is depicted in a stained glass in the Colorado capitol dome, in Colorado State Capitol, in Denver.
- Father Dyer Peak in the Tenmile Range is named for him.
- In Breckenridge, Colorado, a Methodist Church is named for Father Dyer.
- In Fairplay, Colorado, at the South Park City Museum, the Dyer Memorial Chapel is named for Father Dyer.
- In 1977 he was one of the first inductees into the Colorado Ski & Snowboarding Museum Hall of Fame.
- Near Turquoise Lake, outside Leadville, Colorado, stands the Father Dyer Campground.
- Out of Leadville, the Father Dyer Postal Race was named for him, North American's highest ski mountaineering race,
- The Colorado ghost town of Dyersville was named for him.

== See also ==
- Rufus Lumry
- Methodist local preacher
- Snowshoe Thompson

== External links and references ==
- Information on Father Dyer
- On climbing Father Dyer Peak
- Colorado Skiing Hall of Fame on Father Dyer
- Leadville, Colorado newspaper reference
- On "Father" Dyer's church in Breckenridge
- Stories from Park County, on "Father" Dyer
- Geni.com on "Father" Dyer
