= The Saguache Crescent =

Weekly newspaper in Colorado, USA

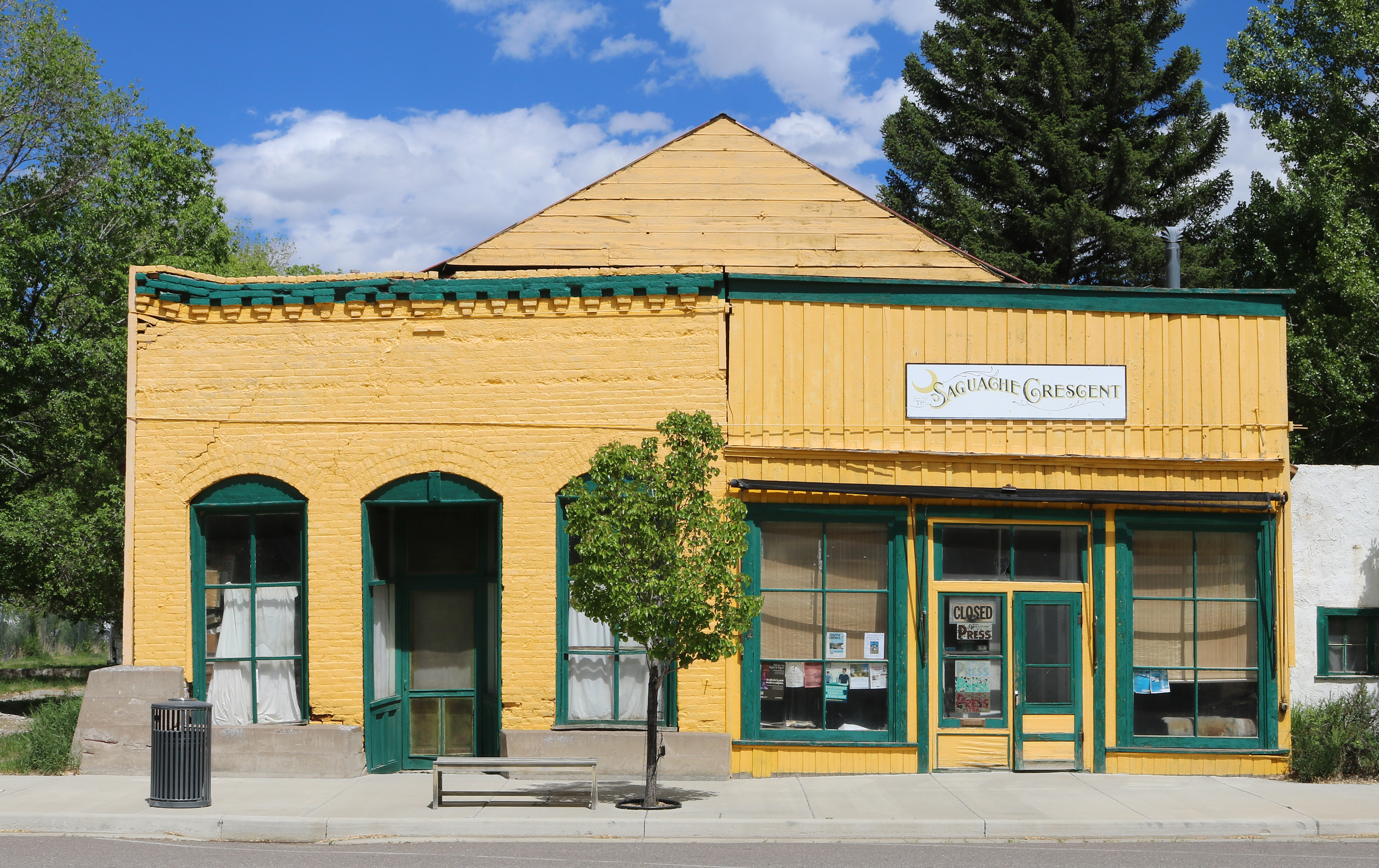
- The paper's office on 4th Street in Saguache
- Type: Weekly newspaper
- Format: Broadsheet
- Publisher: Dean Coombs
- Founded: 1881; 145 years ago
- City: Saguache, Colorado
- Country: United States
- Circulation: 550 (as of January 6, 2016)
- ISSN: 2834-2313 (print); 2834-2321 (web)

The Saguache Crescent (pronounced /səˈwɑːtʃ/) is a weekly newspaper published in Saguache, Colorado, notable for continuing to use a Linotype to produce each issue long after most newspapers have adopted electronic production methods.

== Founding ==
The initial newspaper was started by Otto Mears, who arrived in Saguache in 1867. The site had been long known to Native Americans and Spanish shepherds, but the discovery of gold and silver in the nearby mountains—the Sangre de Cristo Range to the east and the San Juan Mountains to the west—brought a flood of new settlers to the area. Mears recognized the need for a reliable source of food and other essentials, and he constructed a threshing machine and a grist mill for threshing and grinding wheat to make flour for Saguache and the surrounding mining camps. Soon Saguache became a booming supply town, and in 1874 Mears published its first newspaper, The Saguache Chronicle, to attract new pioneers to the area. Following several name changes, the paper took its present name, The Saguache Crescent.

== Present day ==
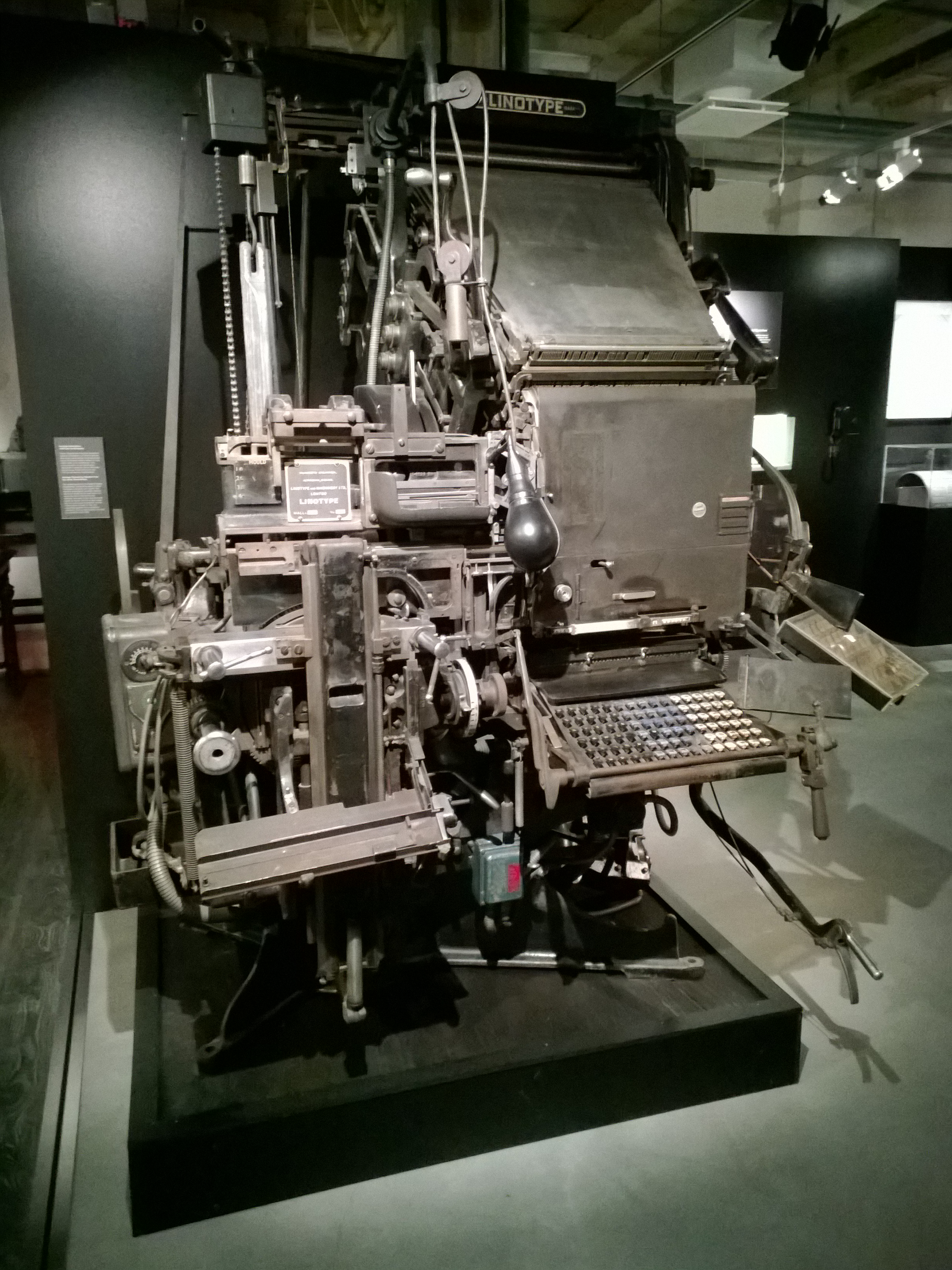
Example of a Linotype machine

Publisher Dean Coombs is the paper's entire staff. The Saguache Crescent was purchased by the Coombs family in 1917, and it has been in the family for three generations. It still uses a 1921 linotype machine to set the print, (Note: The linotype machine, invented in 1886, is a "line casting" machine used in printing. Along with letterpress printing, linotype was the industry standard for newspapers, magazines and posters from the late 19th century to the 1960s and '70s, when it was largely replaced by offset lithography printing and computer typesetting.) and a 1921 printing press. It features a decorative masthead, no photos, sells for 35 cents a copy, and publishes "all the good news fit to print"; Coombs refuses to print bad news. He says that his mother set that policy and it is non-negotiable.

The only task that Coombs does not handle himself is that of reporter; Saguache residents bring the news to him: "If you bring it, and it's not just absolute insanity, and you want to sign your name to it, then I'll generally print it" he says. Coombs must function as repairman as well; as old machines come up for sale he buys them to keep on hand for spare parts.

Saguache is the Saguache County seat and the Crescent is the official newspaper of record for Saguache County. With only about 550 residents, the paper does not generate much income from commercial advertising; Coombs says that income from the county's paid legal notices is all that keeps the paper afloat.

In 2013, newspaper historian Michael S. Sweeney, a professor in the E. W. Scripps School of Journalism, said he knew of no other newspaper still using linotype. CBS News Sunday Morning visited the Crescent in 2014. Coombs said the Crescent was the only newspaper in the U.S., and perhaps even the world, still using Linotype. However, other newspapers continue to use Linotype as part of their production. A weekly newspaper based in Vervins, France, Le Démocrate de l'Aisne, continues to use a Linotype as part of its production. The Brazilian newspaper O Taquaryense, based in Taquari, Rio Grande do Sul and founded in 1887, continues to be printed using typographic composition and Linotype technology.

The most recent edition of The Saguache Crescent was printed in December 2023. Coombs has said that he is not training anyone to take over the paper, so his retirement will be the end of an era.
