= Horseshoe Mountain (Colorado) =

Mountain in Colorado, United States

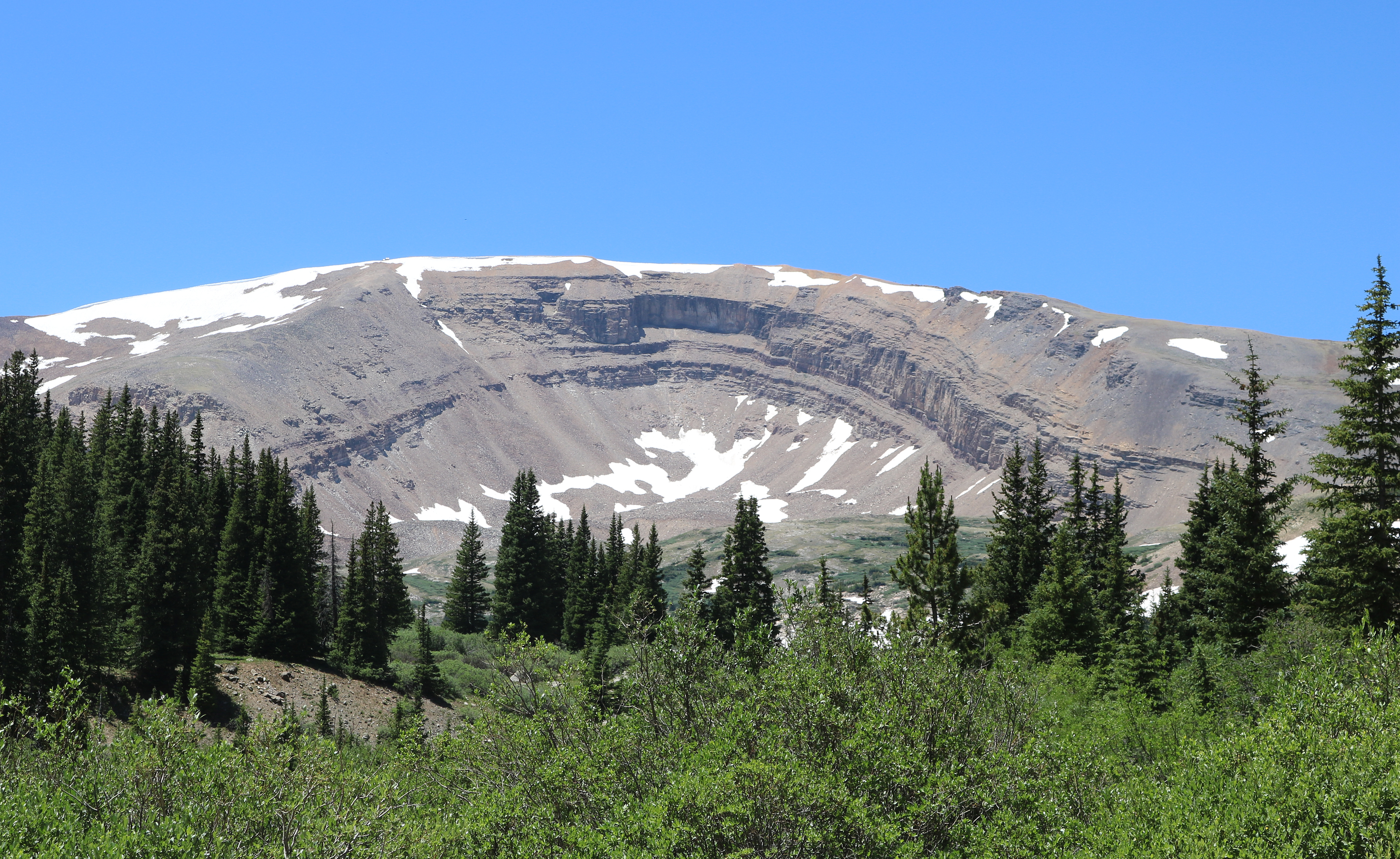
- The mountain and its prominent cirque

Highest point
- Elevation: 13,905 ft (4,238 m)
- Prominence: 758 ft (231 m)
- Isolation: 2.83 mi (4.55 km)
- Coordinates: 39°11′09″N 106°11′07″W

Geography
- Location within Colorado
- Location: Lake and Park counties, Colorado, United States
- Parent range: Mosquito Range
- Topo map(s): USGS 7.5' topographic map Mount Sherman, Colorado

Climbing
- Easiest route: hike

Horseshoe Mountain is a mountain summit in the Mosquito Range of the Rocky Mountains of North America. The 13,905-foot (4,238 m) thirteener is located 7.1 miles (11.5 km) southeast by east (bearing 126°) of the City of Leadville, Colorado, United States, on the drainage divide separating San Isabel National Forest and Lake County from Pike National Forest and Park County.

== Cirque ==
The mountain has a unique and prominent cirque. The cirque is tilted and made up of Paleozoic sedimentary rocks that formed on the floors of ancient seas. It is rare to find sedimentary rocks this high up in Colorado's higher elevations, for most sedimentary stata in the high country were eroded away by glaciers during the ice age. In this case, the glaciers sculpted the strata into a horseshoe shape without eroding it completely.

== See also ==
- List of Colorado mountain ranges
- List of Colorado mountain summits
  - List of Colorado fourteeners
  - List of Colorado 4000 meter prominent summits
  - List of the most prominent summits of Colorado
- List of Colorado county high points
