= Wilkerson Pass =

Mountain pass in Colorado, USA

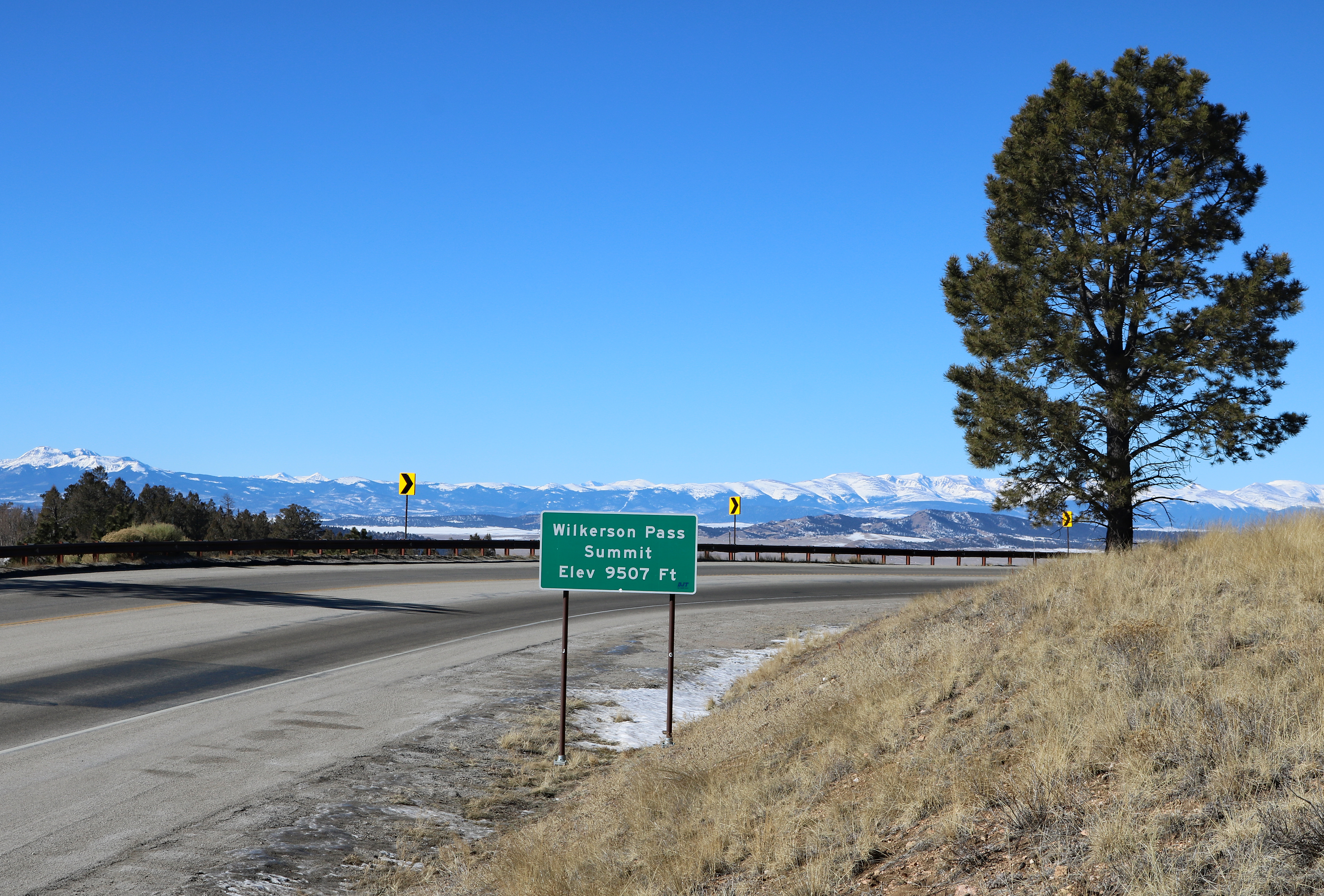
- Wilkerson Pass, looking across South Park

- Location within Colorado
- Elevation: 9,507 feet (2,898 m)
- Traversed by: US 24

Third Approach
- Location: Park County, Colorado, U.S.
- Coordinates: 39°02′17″N 105°31′32″W
- Topo map: USGS Glentivar

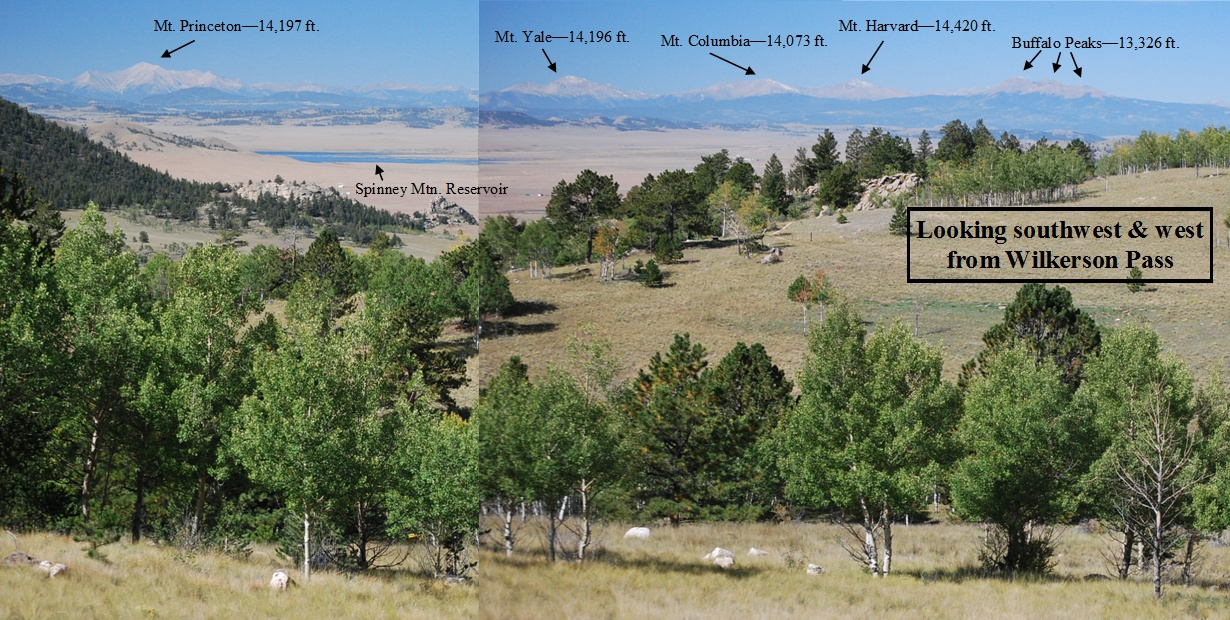
View WSW from the pass toward the Collegiate Mountains, part of the Sawatch Range.

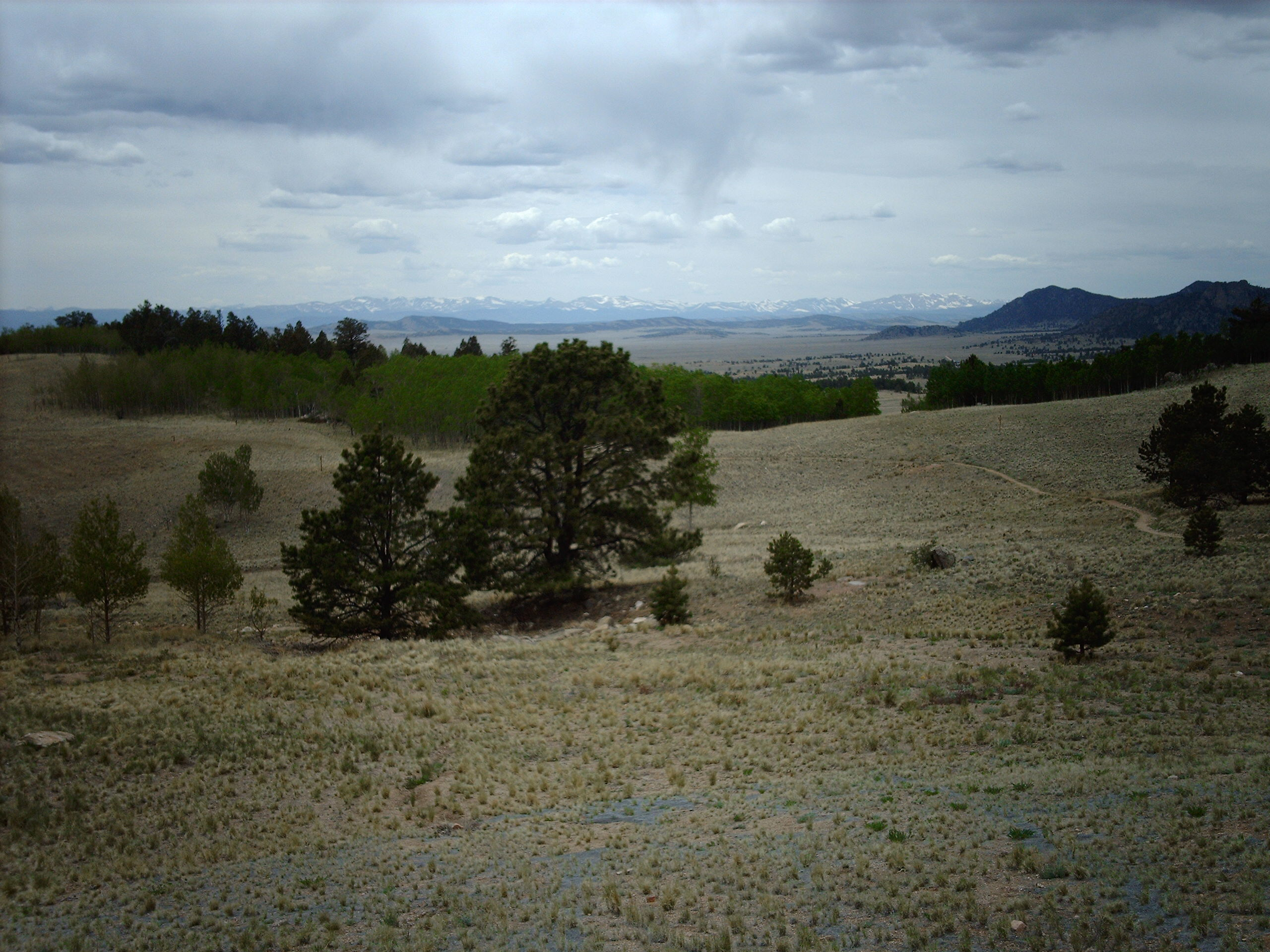
View from the pass toward South Park (Park County, Colorado)

Wilkerson Pass, elevation 9,507 ft (2,898 m), is a mountain pass in the Rocky Mountains within Pike National Forest of Colorado and marks the eastern boundary of South Park (Park County, Colorado).

The pass is traversed by U.S. Highway 24 with a Forest Service visitor center at the summit along with a few short trails. The summit has a mild approach on both sides and does not cause problems for vehicles in winter, generally.

The pass is about 50 miles (80 km) west of Colorado Springs and is surrounded by peaks over 14,000 feet (4,300 m) with Pikes Peak of the Front Range to the east and the Collegiate Peaks of the Sawatch Range to the west.

== See also ==
- Colorado mountain passes
