= Gemini Peak =

Mountain in the American state of Colorado

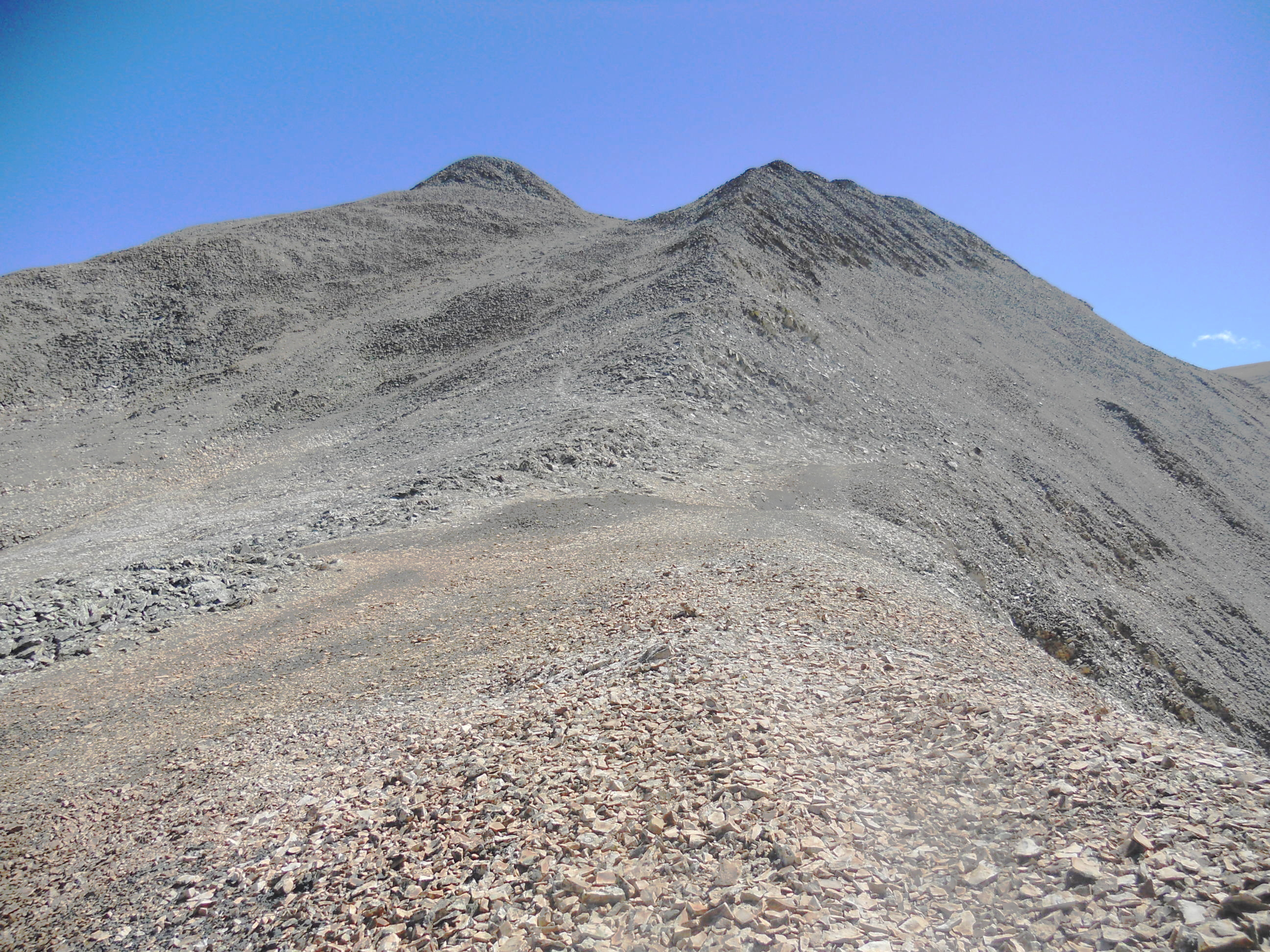
- Gemini Peak viewed from the northwest.

Highest point
- Elevation: 13,958 ft (4,254 m)
- Prominence: 151 ft (46 m)
- Isolation: 0.56 mi (0.90 km)
- Coordinates: 39°14′05″N 106°10′05″W

Geography
- Location within Colorado
- Location: Lake and Park counties, Colorado, United States
- Parent range: Mosquito Range
- Topo map(s): USGS 7.5' topographic map Mount Sherman, Colorado

Climbing
- Easiest route: hike

Gemini Peak is a summit in the Mosquito Range of the Rocky Mountains of North America. The 13,958-foot (4,254 m) mountain is located 0.68 miles (1.1 km) north northeast of Mount Sherman, on the drainage divide separating Lake County from Park County. Gemini Peak is appropriately named considering the mountain has two distinct summits and that the Latin word Gemini means "twins." The northeast summit is slightly higher than its southwest "twin."

== See also ==
- List of Colorado mountain ranges
- List of Colorado mountain summits
  - List of Colorado fourteeners
  - List of Colorado 4000 meter prominent summits
  - List of the most prominent summits of Colorado
- List of Colorado county high points
