= Saguache, Colorado =

Town in Saguache County, Colorado, United States

- Town
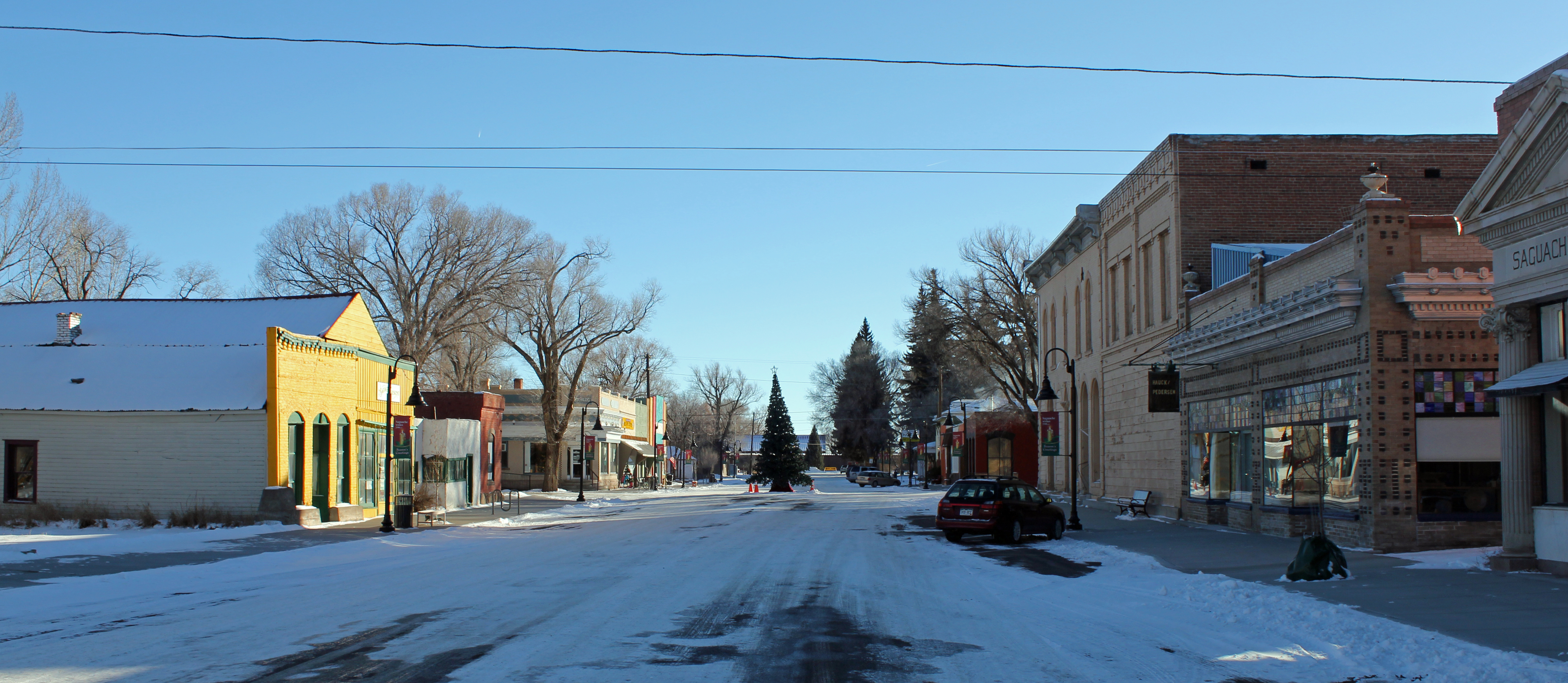
- 4th Street in downtown Saguache (2012)

- Location of Saguache in Saguache County, Colorado
- Coordinates: 38°05′11″N 106°08′28″W
- Country: United States
- State: Colorado
- County: Saguache County – seat
- Incorporated: August 13, 1891

Government
  - Type: Statutory Town

Area
  - Total: 0.39 sq mi (1.02 km^{2})
  - Land: 0.39 sq mi (1.02 km^{2})
  - Water: 0 sq mi (0.00 km^{2})
- Elevation: 7,704 ft (2,348 m)

Population (2020)
  - Total: 539
  - Density: 1,370/sq mi (528/km^{2})
- Time zone: UTC−7 (MST)
  - Summer (DST): UTC−6 (MDT)
- ZIP code: 81149
- Area code: 719
- FIPS code: 08-67005
- GNIS feature ID: 2412591
- Website: www.townofsaguache.org

Saguache (/səˈwɑːtʃ/ sə-WAHTCH) is a statutory town in and the county seat of Saguache County, Colorado, United States. The population was 539 at the United States Census 2020.

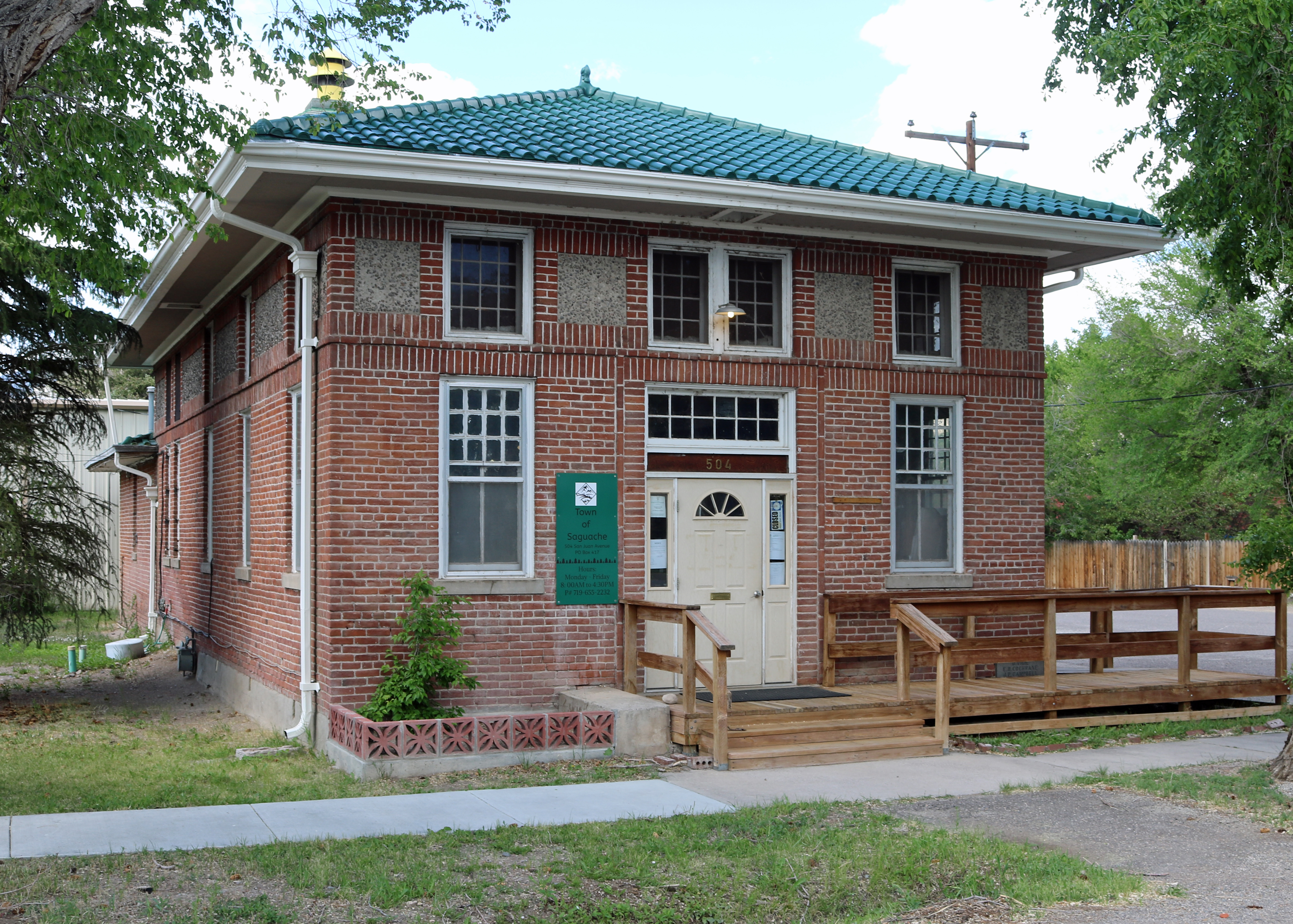
Saguache Town Hall

== History ==
Saguache is a small historical village in an agricultural area in southern Colorado at the northern gateway to the San Luis Valley, a valley between the Sangre de Cristo Range on the east and the San Juan Mountains to the west. Saguache Creek flows through the town from its beginnings high in the San Juan mountains. The site has been known for centuries to Native Americans who moved down from their summer homes in the mountains to the valley during the winter months. The Spanish began to move into the area in the 1600s and Spanish sheepherders passed through each year as they drove their flocks into the hills for summer grazing. Later the early white settlers and miners passed through this area, many seeking passage west along the Old Spanish Trail. In the mid-1860s, the first permanent white settlements were established in Saguache and the nearby town of Villa Grove. Saguache County was officially founded in 1866.

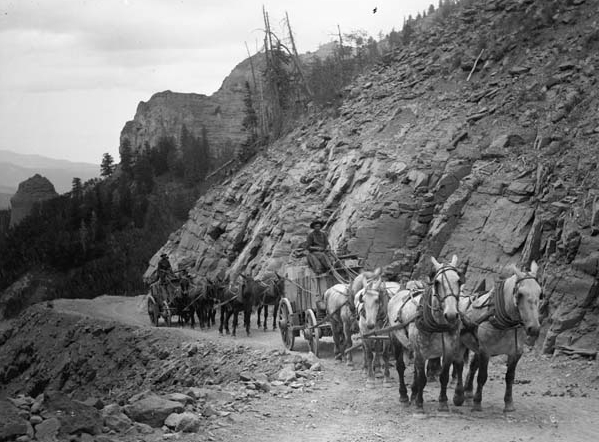
Ore wagons, San Juan Mountains

The formation of the town was influenced by the occupations and needs of the era. Beginning as a trading post, in the late 1800s mining became a significant influence as the Colorado mining boom brought hundreds of mining operations to the surrounding mountains and the miners needed a steady supply of food and other goods.

The town was founded by Otto Mears, who came to Saguache in 1867. Mears constructed a wheat thresher and a grist mill for thrashing and grinding wheat to make flour to supply Saguache and the surrounding mines. He also built toll roads over the nearby mountain passes to use for hauling supplies to mining camps to the north, and to further open the area to settlement. The Saguache Town Company was formed in 1874 turning Saguache into a booming supply town. Mears also established a newspaper, the Saguache Chronicle, to attract pioneers to Saguache. Mears later helped build the Million Dollar Highway.

=== Today ===
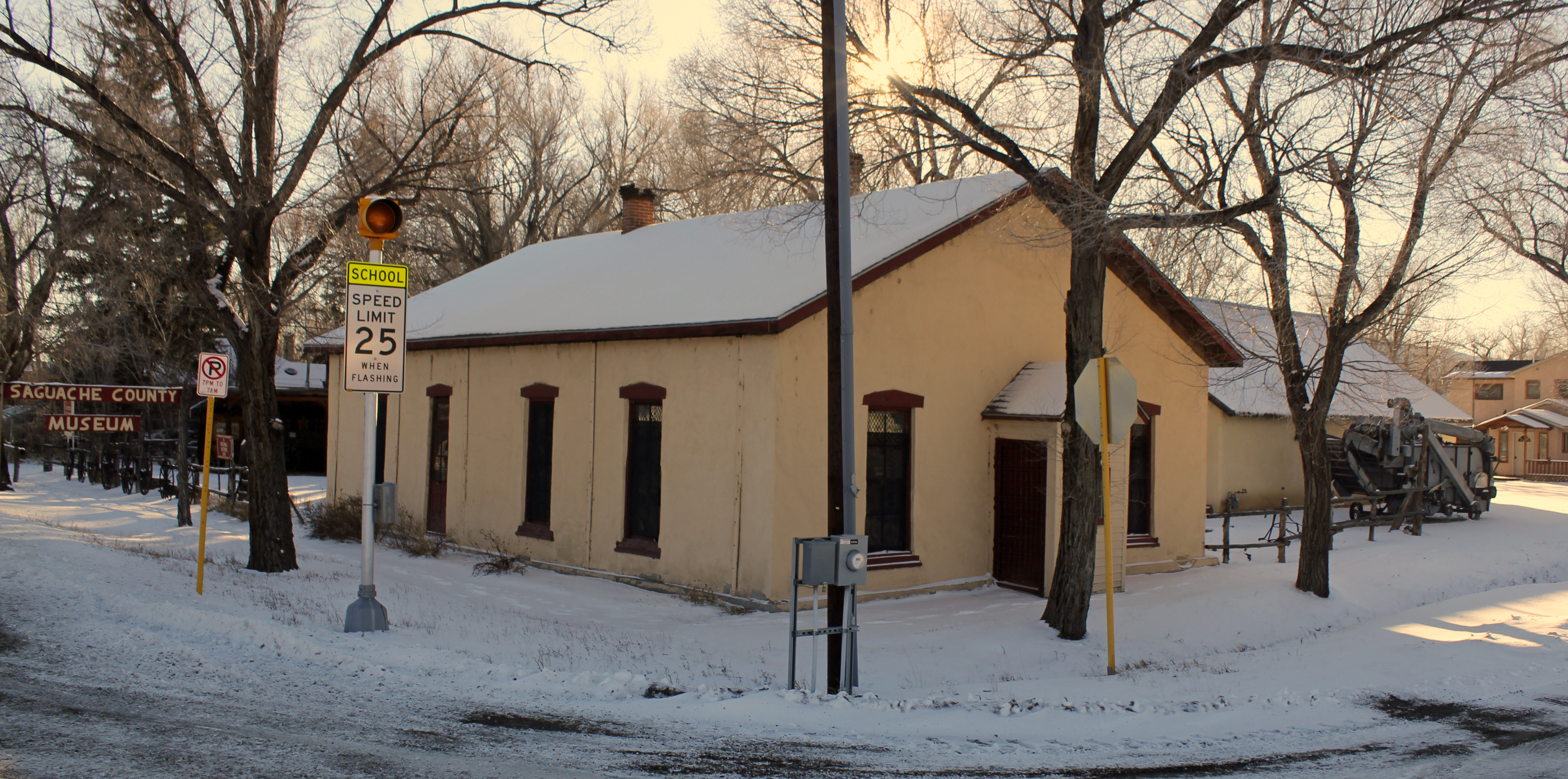
Historic Saguache School and Jail Buildings

From its early days as a boom town, the population of Saguache has shrunk to around 500 residents. The Saguache visitor guide writes that "In its heyday, Saguache could boast of having the Colorado Hall (serving the purest wines and liquors), the Saguache Meat Market, a boarding house, a grocery, law firms, a hardware store, a hotel, a sawmill, and The Saguache Chronicle newspaper." After several name changes, The Saguache Chronicle eventually became The Saguache Crescent. The paper is printed every week on a flatbed press built in 1915 with metal type cast on a Linotype composing machine. The Linotype may be the only one still in use in the United States. It is also still the county's "paper of record," and is operated by a third generation descendant of the family who purchased it in 1917.

The early sheep ranching eventually gave way to cattle and alfalfa hay production. Present-day Saguache has "one school, a library, a museum, four churches, two gas stations, one liquor store, two grocery stores, two restaurants, a sawmill, and an organic farm."

=== Name ===
According to a 2013 Denver Post article entitled, "What's in a Colorado name pronunciation?", the name Saguache (pronounced /səˈwɑːtʃ/) comes from a Ute language word meaning "sand dune". A Native American, Naranjo, explains the history of the name: "The Utes don't have an alphabet. The way the immigrants heard it, the way you hear it, is how they spelled it. The word is 'sə wŭp;' it means 'sand dunes.' But the immigrants couldn't pronounce it, so they called it 'sə wäch.' "

But according to a 1995 letter to the editor of the Colorado Central Magazine, the name Saguache means "Blue earth — water at the blue earth." The writer had written to correct an article in which the word was said to mean "green place", but according to the writer, the word comes from a shortened form of the Ute language word "Saguaguachipa." The Ute tribe encampments were common in the area around the present-day community and the name "referred to springs in which blue earth was said to be found to the north". The Editors replied: "The Ute Dictionary, published in 1977 by the Southern Ute Indian Tribe of Ignacio, Colo., defines "sagwa-ci" [diacritical marks omitted] as "'Saguache', lit. 'green place'; name of a town in the San Luis Valley in So. Colorado ..." One source states that the "blue earth" mentioned refers to a deposit of blue clay found near the creek.

The Colorado State Historical Society has a different take on the meaning: The note on a community monument: Saguache, "the name derived from the Indian word `Blue Water'."

The Spanish language version of this name is usually spelled "Saguache", while the English language version is usually spelled "Sawatch".

== Geography ==
Saguache is served by U.S. Route 285 and Colorado State Highway 114. Saguache Creek flows past to the southwest of the community.

According to the United States Census Bureau, the town has a total area of 0.4 square miles (1.0 km^{2}), all of it land.

Climate data for Saguache, Colorado (1981–2010)
Month	Jan	Feb	Mar	Apr	May	Jun	Jul	Aug	Sep	Oct	Nov	Dec	Year
Mean daily maximum °F (°C)	35.4 (1.9)	39.9 (4.4)	49.8 (9.9)	58.8 (14.9)	67.1 (19.5)	76.1 (24.5)	79.9 (26.6)	77.2 (25.1)	71.4 (21.9)	61.1 (16.2)	47.2 (8.4)	35.8 (2.1)	58.3 (14.6)
Mean daily minimum °F (°C)	5.4 (−14.8)	10.7 (−11.8)	20.5 (−6.4)	26.8 (−2.9)	35.3 (1.8)	43.1 (6.2)	49.0 (9.4)	48.0 (8.9)	39.5 (4.2)	29.4 (−1.4)	17.9 (−7.8)	6.9 (−13.9)	27.7 (−2.4)
Average precipitation inches (mm)	0.23 (5.8)	0.21 (5.3)	0.39 (9.9)	0.56 (14)	0.62 (16)	0.59 (15)	1.29 (33)	1.81 (46)	1.09 (28)	0.65 (17)	0.35 (8.9)	0.26 (6.6)	8.05 (204)
Average snowfall inches (cm)	3.5 (8.9)	3.7 (9.4)	3.9 (9.9)	1.8 (4.6)	0.5 (1.3)	0.0 (0.0)	0.0 (0.0)	0.0 (0.0)	0.0 (0.0)	0.7 (1.8)	2.5 (6.4)	3.6 (9.1)	20.3 (52)
Source: NOAA

== Demographics ==
Historical population
Census	Pop.	Note	%±
1880	325		—
1890	660		103.1%
1900	389		−41.1%
1910	620		59.4%
1920	948		52.9%
1930	1,010		6.5%
1940	1,219		20.7%
1950	1,024		−16.0%
1960	722		−29.5%
1970	642		−11.1%
1980	656		2.2%
1990	584		−11.0%
2000	578		−1.0%
2010	485		−16.1%
2020	539		11.1%

== Attractions and recreation ==
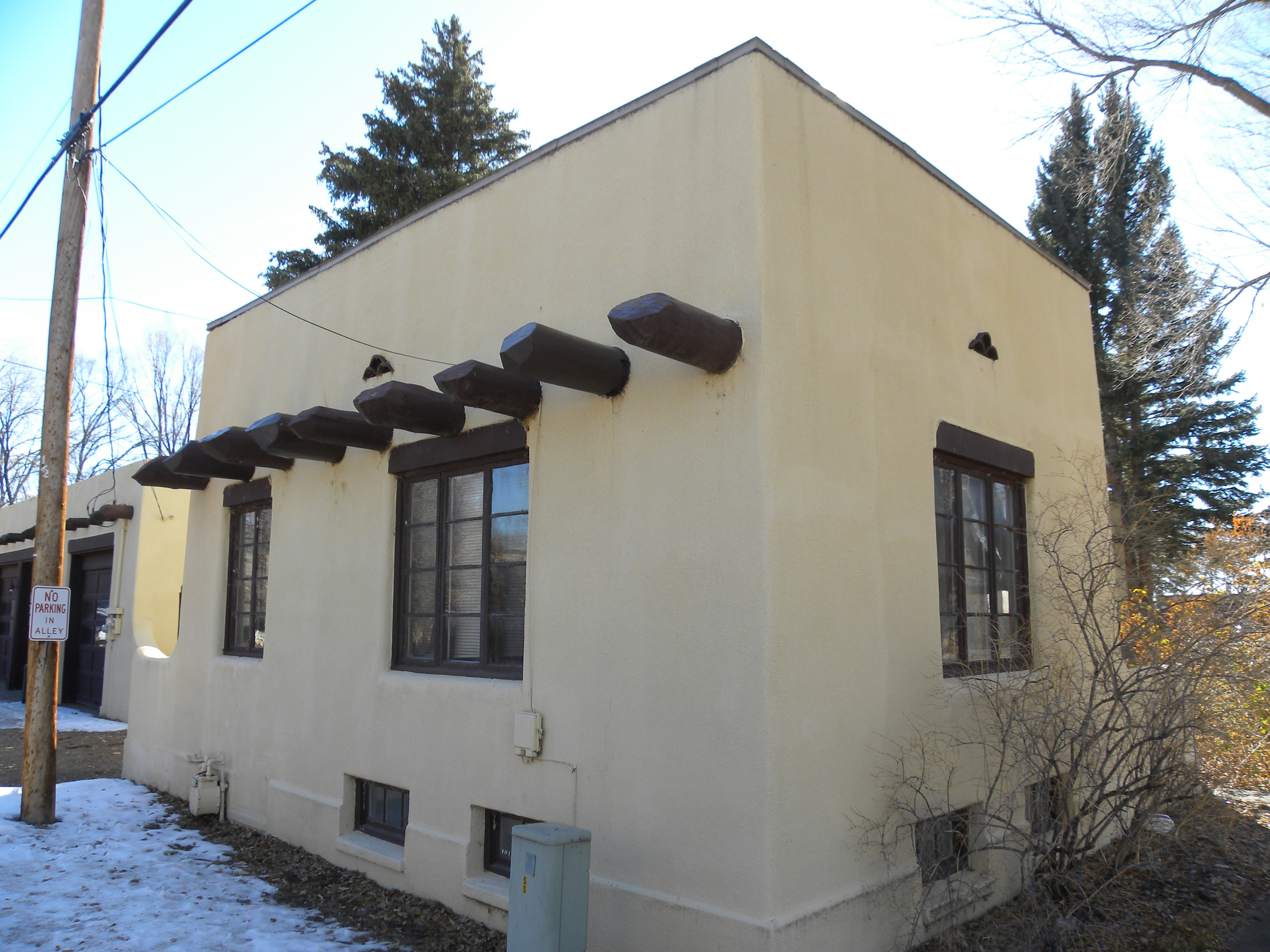
Saguache Ranger House - Circa 1939

As the gateway to the San Juan Mountains, home to the Rio Grande National Forest and the La Garita Wilderness Area, Saguache offers outdoor activities such as sightseeing, cycling, hiking and camping. Highway 114 to Cochetopa Pass follows the original Old Spanish Trail, offering high country scenery and access to large tracts of public lands.

Saguache has a small museum. According to the information they provide:

In a tribute to our forebears and in keeping with the work ethic embedded from our agricultural heritage, this Museum has won acclaim from visitors all over the United States, and many foreign countries.

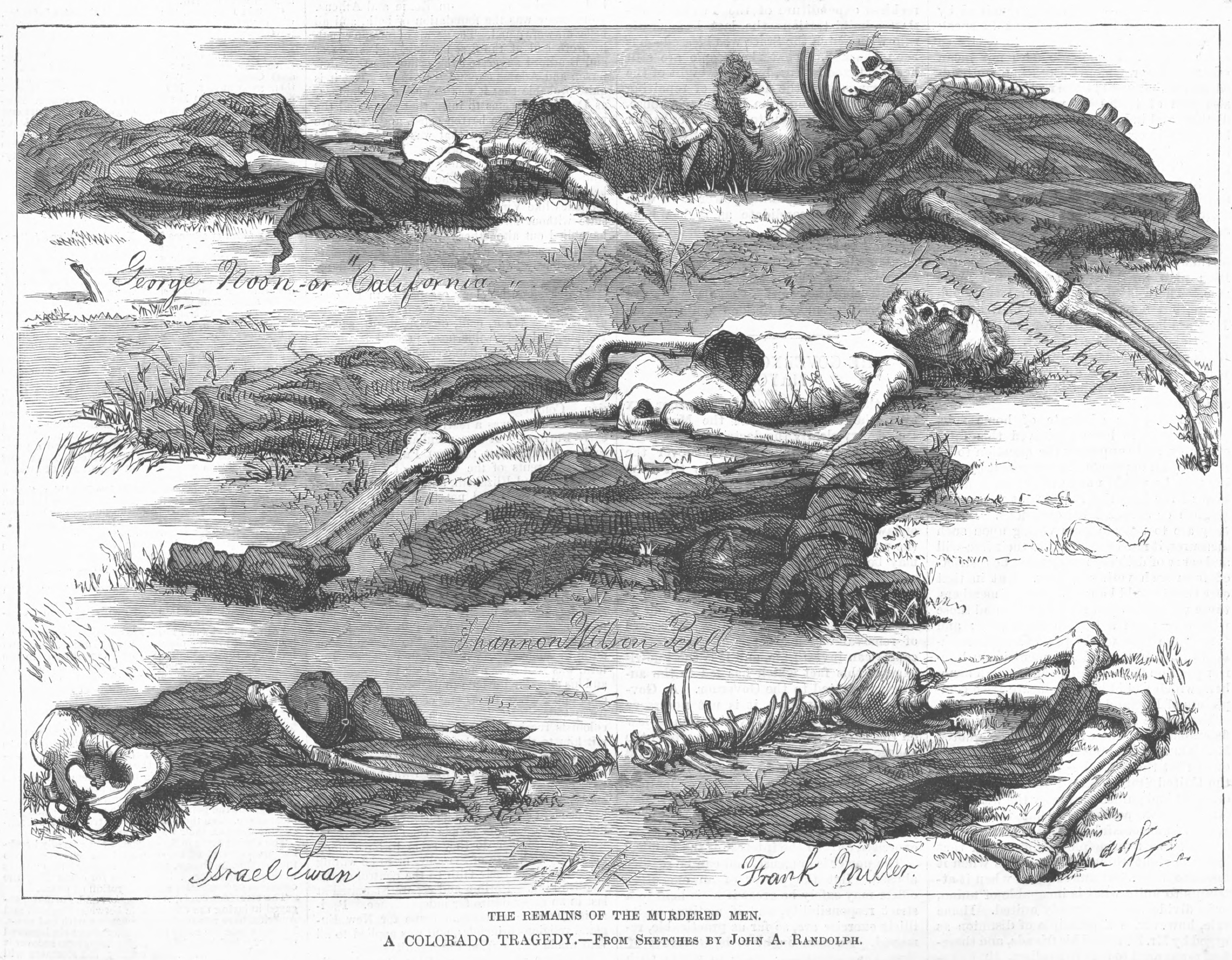
Harper's Weekly, October 17, 1874, issue. Illustration by John A. Randolph of the scene of "A Colorado Tragedy". Photo taken from an original copy.

The museum provides information related to convicted cannibal Alferd Packer, who served time in the Saguache County Jail. On February 9, 1874, Alferd Packer and five other men departed from the camp of Ute Chief Ouray, near what is now Montrose, Colorado, prospecting for gold. The party was soon stranded in a blizzard near Lake City and nothing was seen of them until April, when Packer came out of the mountains alone. Packer gave several conflicting stories about the fate of the other men, but finding his stories dubious he was jailed in Saguache where he remained until August, when he escaped. By coincidence, on the day of Packer's escape from the Saguache jail, the remains of the missing prospectors were found with evidence of foul play and cannibalism. He was eventually found in Wyoming; he was returned and tried in Lake City. Found guilty, he was sentenced to 40 years and was paroled after serving 17. He died in 1907 and by all accounts had been "a model citizen" for his remaining years.

Due to the nature of the crime, at the time it was sensationalized and well-covered throughout the nation, and it remains a well-known incident locally in Colorado. The area where the bodies were discovered is now known as Cannibal Plateau. Packer is remembered in Lake City by holding an annual Alferd Packer Jeep Tour and Barbecue. The cafeteria in the University of Colorado, Boulder, student union is called the Alferd Packer Memorial Grill.

The museum displays a figure of Packer sitting in a cell with the sheriff guarding the prisoner from his chair in his office. On display are handcuffs, leg irons and other items relating to the history of Alfred Packer.

== See also ==
- Old Spanish National Historic Trail
- San Luis Valley
