= Mosquito Range =

Mountain range in Colorado, US

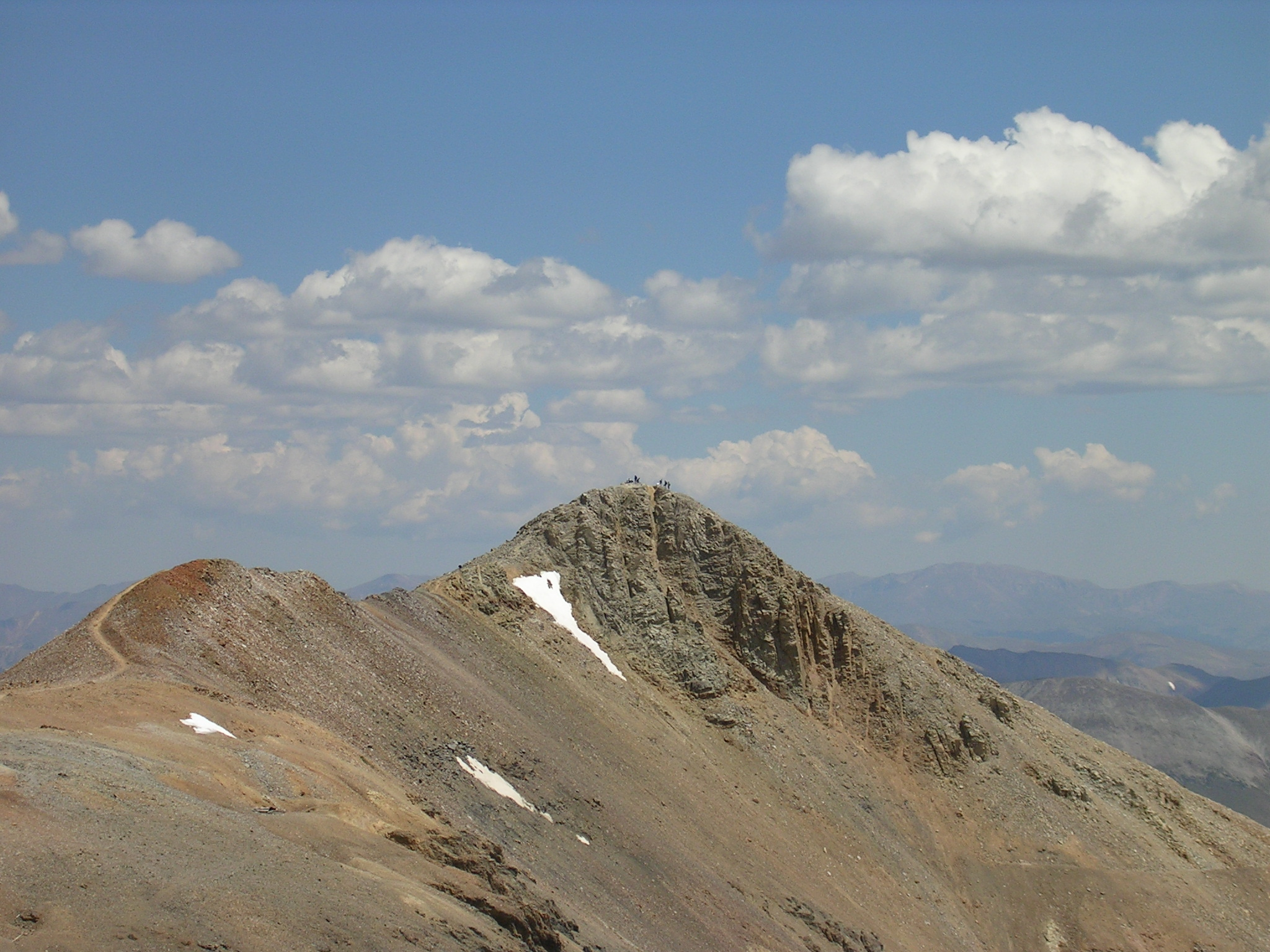
- Mount Lincoln

Highest point
- Peak: Mount Lincoln
- Elevation: 14,286 ft (4,354 m)
- Listing: Mountain ranges of Colorado
- Coordinates: 39°21′05″N 106°06′39″W

Dimensions
- Length: 40 mi (64 km) NS

Geography
- Location within Colorado
- Country: United States
- State: Colorado
- Parent range: Rocky Mountains
- Borders on: Sawatch Range

Geology
- Orogeny: Laramide orogeny
- Rock age: Cretaceous – Paleogene
- Rock type: granite

The Mosquito Range (elevation approximately 14,000 ft) is a high mountain range in the Rocky Mountains of central Colorado in the United States. The peaks of the range form a ridge running north–south for roughly 40 mi (64 km) from southern Summit County on the north end, then along the boundary between Lake and Park Counties. The range forms a high barrier separating the headwaters of the Arkansas River near Leadville from South Park and the headwaters of the South Platte River near Fairplay. The highest peak in the range is Mount Lincoln at an elevation of 14,286 ft. Other fourteeners in the range are Quandary Peak (14,272 ft), Mount Bross (14,172 ft), Mount Democrat (14,148 ft), and Mount Sherman (14,036 ft).

== Geology ==
The mountains are faulted anticlines formed as part of the Sawatch Uplift during the Laramide orogeny around 65 million years ago (Mya). The mountains were originally contiguous with the higher Sawatch Range to the west, but were separated during the formation of the rift valley at the headwaters of the Arkansas River about 35 Mya. The range is primarily of granite. The eastern flank of the range along the rim of South Park is overlain by Paleozoic and Mesozoic sedimentary rocks. The northern end of the range was glaciated during Pleistocene time, forming U-shaped valleys in the canyons.

The high ridge of the range forms a relatively difficult barrier between South Park and the Arkansas headwaters. Several of the high peaks of the range are prominently visible from the southern side of Fremont Pass along State Highway 91 between Climax and Leadville. The range is not traversed by any major highway, but only in two places by backroads over high passes: Mosquito Pass and Weston Pass. Much of the range is located within the Pike National Forest.

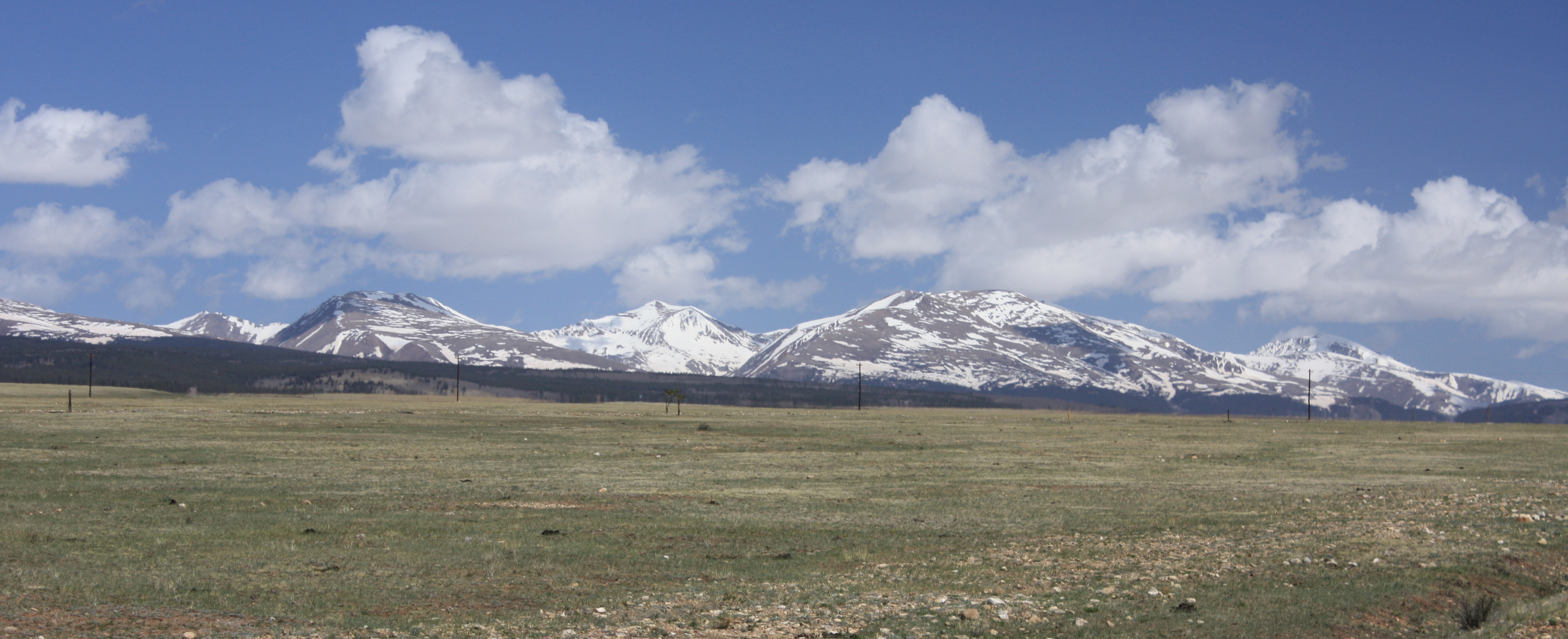
Tenmile and Mosquito Ranges: (left to right) Loveland Mountain (13,692 ft), Mount Democrat, Mount Bross and Quandary Peak: View from U.S. 285, about 8 mi south of Fairplay

== Highest peaks ==
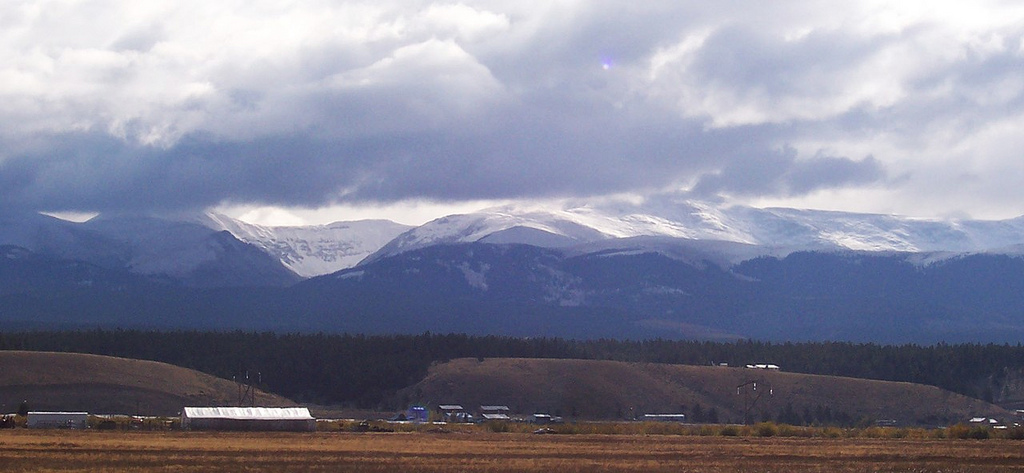
Weston Pass and the southern Mosquito Range, September 2009

The eight highest peaks of the Mosquito Range
| Rank | Peak | Elevation |
|---|---|---|
| 1 | Mount Lincoln | 14,293 ft = 4356.5 m |
| 2 | Quandary Peak | 14,265 ft = 4348.0 m |
| 3 | Mount Democrat | 14,148 ft = 4312.3 m |
| 4 | Mount Sherman | 14,036 ft = 4278.2 m |
| 5 | Fletcher Mountain | 13,951 ft = 4252.3 m |
| 5 | Gemini Peak | 13,951 ft = 4252.3 m |
| 7 | Pacific Peak | 13,950 ft = 4252.0 m |
| 8 | Horseshoe Mountain | 13,898 ft = 4236.1 m |

== See also ==
- Southern Rocky Mountains
  - Tenmile Range
