= Mount Sherman =

Mountain in Colorado, United States

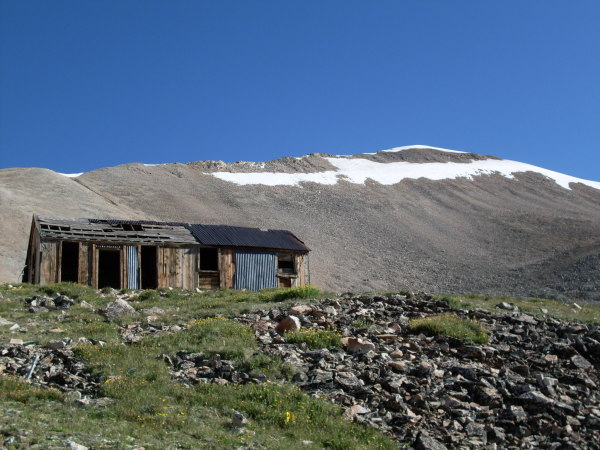

Highest point
- Elevation: 14,040.4 ft (4,279.5 m); NAPGD2022
- Prominence: 850 ft (259 m)
- Isolation: 8.06 mi (12.97 km)
- Listing: Colorado Fourteener 45th
- Coordinates: 39°13′30″N 106°10′11″W

Geography
- Location within Colorado
- Location: Lake and Park counties, Colorado, United States
- Parent range: Mosquito Range
- Topo map(s): USGS 7.5' topographic map Mount Sherman, Colorado

Climbing
- Easiest route: Southwest Ridge: Hike, class 2

Mount Sherman is a high mountain summit in the Mosquito Range of the Rocky Mountains of North America. The 14,040.4-foot (4,280 m) fourteener is located 6.8 miles (11.0 km) east by south (bearing 103°) of the City of Leadville, Colorado, United States, on the drainage divide separating Lake County from Park County. The mountain was named in honor of General William Tecumseh Sherman.

== Mountain ==
Mount Sherman is one of the most undistinguished of the fourteeners, and among the easiest to climb; it is recommended as a beginner fourteener. It is also the only fourteener that has had a successful aircraft landing on its summit.

== Climate ==
Climate data for Mount Sherman 39.2284 N, 106.1687 W, Elevation: 13,780 ft (4,200 m) (1991–2020 normals)
| Month | Jan | Feb | Mar | Apr | May | Jun | Jul | Aug | Sep | Oct | Nov | Dec | Year |
|---|---|---|---|---|---|---|---|---|---|---|---|---|---|
| Mean daily maximum °F (°C) | 19.1 (−7.2) | 18.0 (−7.8) | 24.4 (−4.2) | 31.2 (−0.4) | 39.8 (4.3) | 50.8 (10.4) | 56.8 (13.8) | 54.5 (12.5) | 48.4 (9.1) | 37.4 (3.0) | 25.7 (−3.5) | 19.4 (−7.0) | 35.5 (1.9) |
| Daily mean °F (°C) | 8.4 (−13.1) | 7.3 (−13.7) | 12.7 (−10.7) | 18.6 (−7.4) | 27.4 (−2.6) | 37.4 (3.0) | 43.6 (6.4) | 41.9 (5.5) | 35.6 (2.0) | 25.5 (−3.6) | 15.5 (−9.2) | 8.9 (−12.8) | 23.6 (−4.7) |
| Mean daily minimum °F (°C) | −2.3 (−19.1) | −3.4 (−19.7) | 0.9 (−17.3) | 5.9 (−14.5) | 15.0 (−9.4) | 23.9 (−4.5) | 30.3 (−0.9) | 29.3 (−1.5) | 22.8 (−5.1) | 13.6 (−10.2) | 5.2 (−14.9) | −1.6 (−18.7) | 11.6 (−11.3) |
| Average precipitation inches (mm) | 3.16 (80) | 3.11 (79) | 3.55 (90) | 4.20 (107) | 2.95 (75) | 1.56 (40) | 2.93 (74) | 3.21 (82) | 2.42 (61) | 2.39 (61) | 2.92 (74) | 2.95 (75) | 35.35 (898) |
Source: PRISM Climate Group

== Sherman Mine ==
The Sherman mine, located in upper Iowa Gulch at and above 12,200 ft. on the west flank of Mt. Sherman, produced over 10 million ounces of silver, mostly between 1968 and 1982, with a value of over $300 million at 2010 prices. The Sherman silver-lead-zinc deposit is hosted in dolomites of the Early Mississippian Leadville Formation. Mineralization is within an integrated cavern system that developed in these carbonate rocks in Late Mississippian time. Pb-Zn-Ag mineralization was emplaced into the old cave system at about 272 ± 18 Ma, during the Early Permian era.

Secondary ore minerals from the Sherman mine are popular with mineral collectors. The prominent ruins of the historic buildings and structures of the Hilltop Mine (above the more recent Sherman mine workings) are often visited and photographed by hikers and mountaineers.

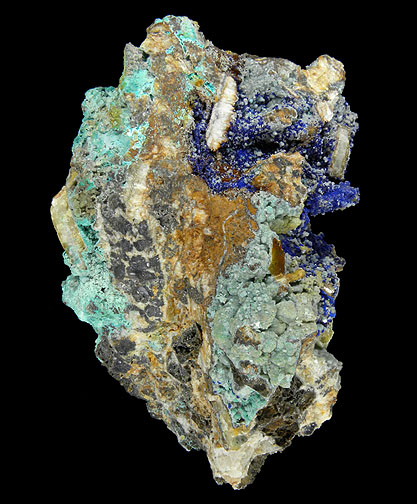
Cerussite-Rosasite-Azurite-Smithsonite-Mimetite (etc.), classic secondary ore mineral specimen from the Sherman Mine. Size: 15.1 x 10.6 x 9.8 cm. Click on image for more photos of this specimen.

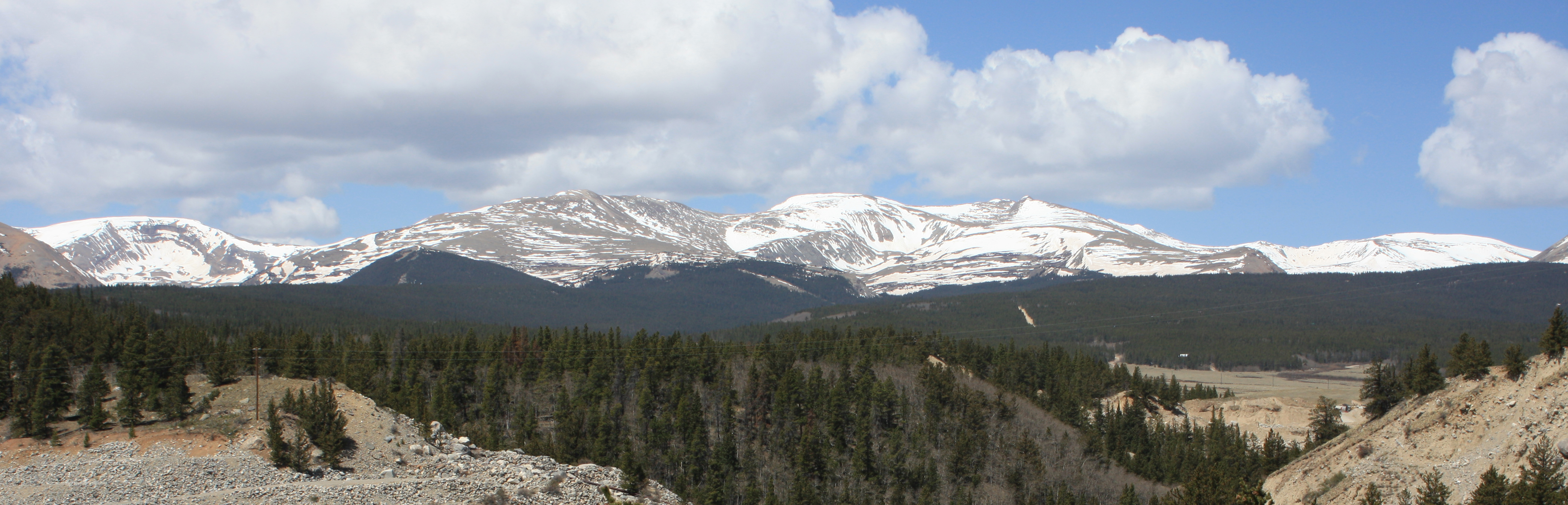
Mount Sherman and the Mosquito Range: (left to right) Horseshoe Mountain (obvious), White Ridge, Mount Sherman, Gemini Peak and "Mount Evans #2" (far right), looking west from State Highway 9, just north of Fairplay. Photo taken in May 2009, courtesy of David Herrera.

== See also ==
- List of mountain peaks of Colorado
  - List of Colorado fourteeners
