= Mosquito Pass =

Mountain pass in Colorado, USA

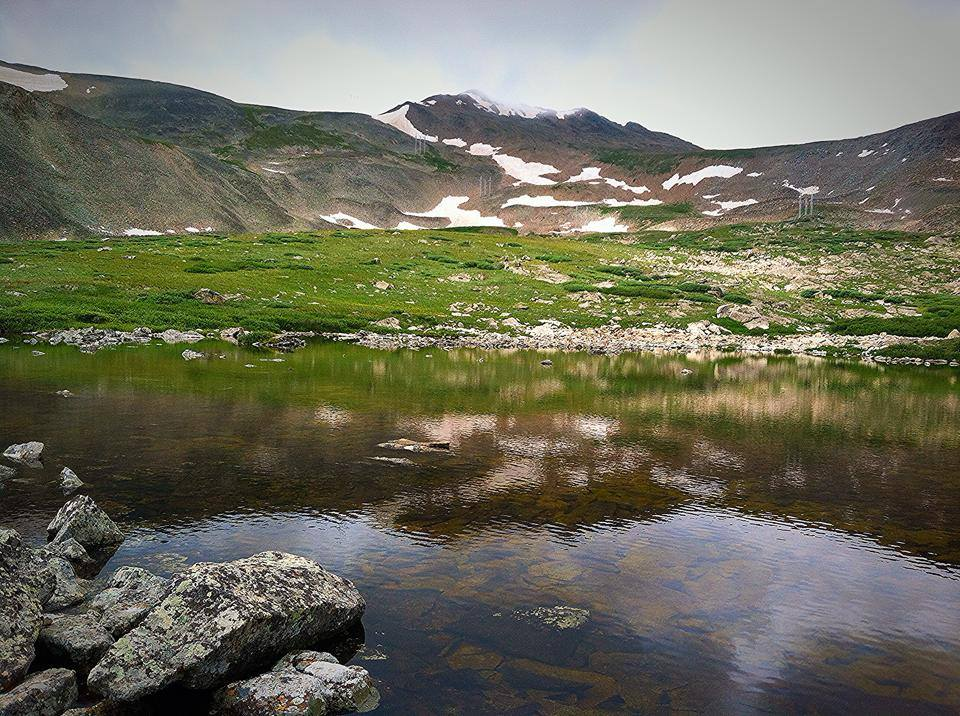
- Interactive map of Mosquito Pass
- Elevation: 13,185 ft (4,019 m)
- Traversed by: Unpaved road

Location
- Location: Lake / Park counties, Colorado, U.S.
- Range: Mosquito Range
- Coordinates: 39°16′53″N 106°11′10″W
- Topo map: USGS Climax

Mosquito Pass, with an elevation of 13,185 ft (4,019 m), is a high mountain pass in the Mosquito Range of central Colorado in the United States. It lies on the boundary between Lake and Park counties between Leadville (west) and Fairplay (east). It also lies on the divide between the Arkansas and South Platte Rivers, which is the informal demarcation between the northern and southern parts of Colorado, east of the Continental Divide.

One of the highest passes in the state, Mosquito Pass can be traversed only on foot, on an offroad motorcycle or with a proper four-wheel drive (4WD) vehicle. 2WD vehicles will find the road difficult due to the stream crossings and high rocky sections. Even with 4WD, it is typically passable only during the summer months.
