= San Luis Closed Basin =

Endorheic basin in Colorado

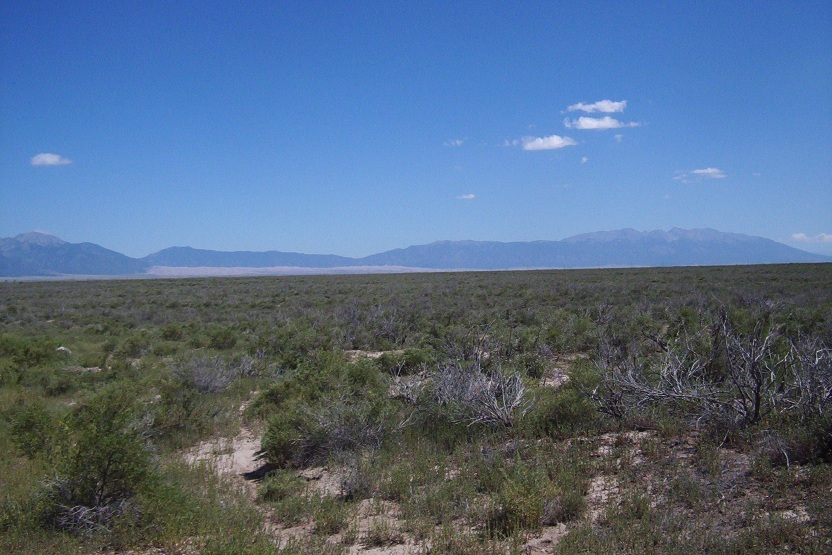
The San Luis Closed Basin between Hooper and Moffat, with the Sangre de Cristo Range.

The San Luis Closed Basin is a 2,940-square-mile (7,600 km^{2}) endorheic basin in the Alamosa and Saguache counties of south-central Colorado. It includes San Luis Creek and its tributary, Saguache Creek. While the basin is east of the majority of the Rocky Mountains, it lies west of the Sangre de Cristo Range. An elevated plateau in Alamosa County, the San Luis Hills, separates the San Luis Closed Basin drainage from most of the San Luis Valley, which is southward-flowing and drains through the Rio Grande.

== Hydrology ==
The San Luis Closed Basin forms a major segment of the eastern slope of the Colorado section of the Continental Divide. Historically, all of the waters that naturally entered the basin through hydrologic processes were disposed of by evapotranspiration, of which the endpoint was a playa adjacent to the Great Sand Dunes. Starting in the 1970s, part of the water that had previously flowed toward the playa was diverted to the Rio Grande drainage through a canal constructed in the 1970s as part of the Closed Basin Project. As part of the Project, part of the former playa was redeveloped as an intermittent recreational lake, San Luis Lake. Some of the water from the Basin continues to be allocated to San Luis Lake for recreational purposes. The hydrology of the Closed Basin is currently monitored and managed by the Rio Grande Water Conservation District.

== Ecology ==
The San Luis Closed Basin is disturbed semiarid land characterized by widespread patches of greasewood, often locally called "chico" or "chico brush." It forms part of the breeding area of the southwestern willow flycatcher, a bird that is a United States endangered subspecies.
