= Sawatch Uplift =

Geologic anticline in Colorado, United States

Coordinates: 39.15°N 106.32°W

The Sawatch Uplift /səˈwætʃ/ is a prominent geologic anticline in the Rocky Mountains in central Colorado in the United States. It was formed as a bulge in the North American Plate approximately 70–65 MYA during the Laramide orogeny that created the modern Rocky Mountains. The uplift runs north–south for about 100 miles (160 km) in central Colorado. The Sawatch Range and Mosquito Range were both formed as part of the uplift. Approximately 35 MYA, stresses in the continental plate in the center of the uplift caused the center to collapse, forming the upper Arkansas River graben. This is a trough between the Sawatch and Mosquito Range that is part of the larger Rio Grande Rift. The trough runs southward from Leadville, CO to the San Luis basin. The upper Arkansas Graben forms the headwater valley of the Arkansas River.
