= Fairplay, Colorado =

Statutory town and seat of Park County, Colorado, United States

- statutory town
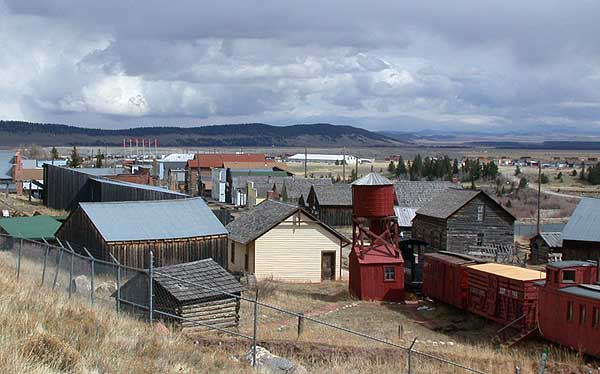
- View of Fairplay and South Park looking south from State Highway 9. The historic buildings of South Park City, an open-air museum, are in the foreground.
- Nickname: The Real South Park
- Motto: Where History Meets the High Country
- Location of the Town of Fairplay in Park County, Colorado
- Coordinates: 39°13′29″N 106°00′05″W
- Country: United States
- State: Colorado
- County: Park
- Settled: 1859
- Incorporated: November 15, 1872

Government
  - Type: statutory town
  - Mayor: Ray Douglas

Area
  - Total: 1.156 sq mi (2.995 km^{2})
  - Land: 1.147 sq mi (2.971 km^{2})
  - Water: 0.0093 sq mi (0.024 km^{2})
- Elevation: 9,955 ft (3,034 m)

Population (2020)
  - Total: 724
  - Density: 631/sq mi (244/km^{2})
- Time zone: UTC−07:00 (MST)
  - Summer (DST): UTC−06:00 (MDT)
- ZIP code: 80440, 80456, 80432 (PO Box)
- Area code: 719
- GNIS feature ID: 2412616
- FIPS code: 08-25610
- Website: fairplayco.us

Fairplay is the statutory town that is the county seat of and the most populous municipality in Park County, Colorado, United States. The town population was 724 at the 2020 United States census. Fairplay is located in South Park at an elevation of 9,953 feet (3,034 m). The town is the sixth-highest incorporated municipality in the State of Colorado. Fairplay is a part of the Denver-Aurora-Centennial, CO Metropolitan Statistical Area and the Front Range Urban Corridor.

The city has been cited as the setting of the animated series South Park on several occasions, though this is not a consistent concept and other episodes set it in a fictional town of the same name located in the valley.

== History ==
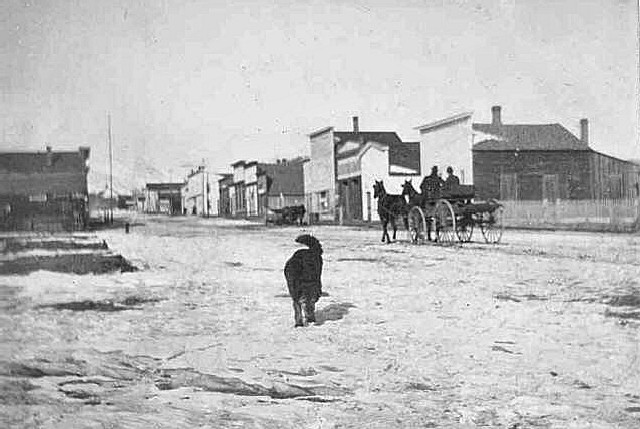
Front Street, late 1800s

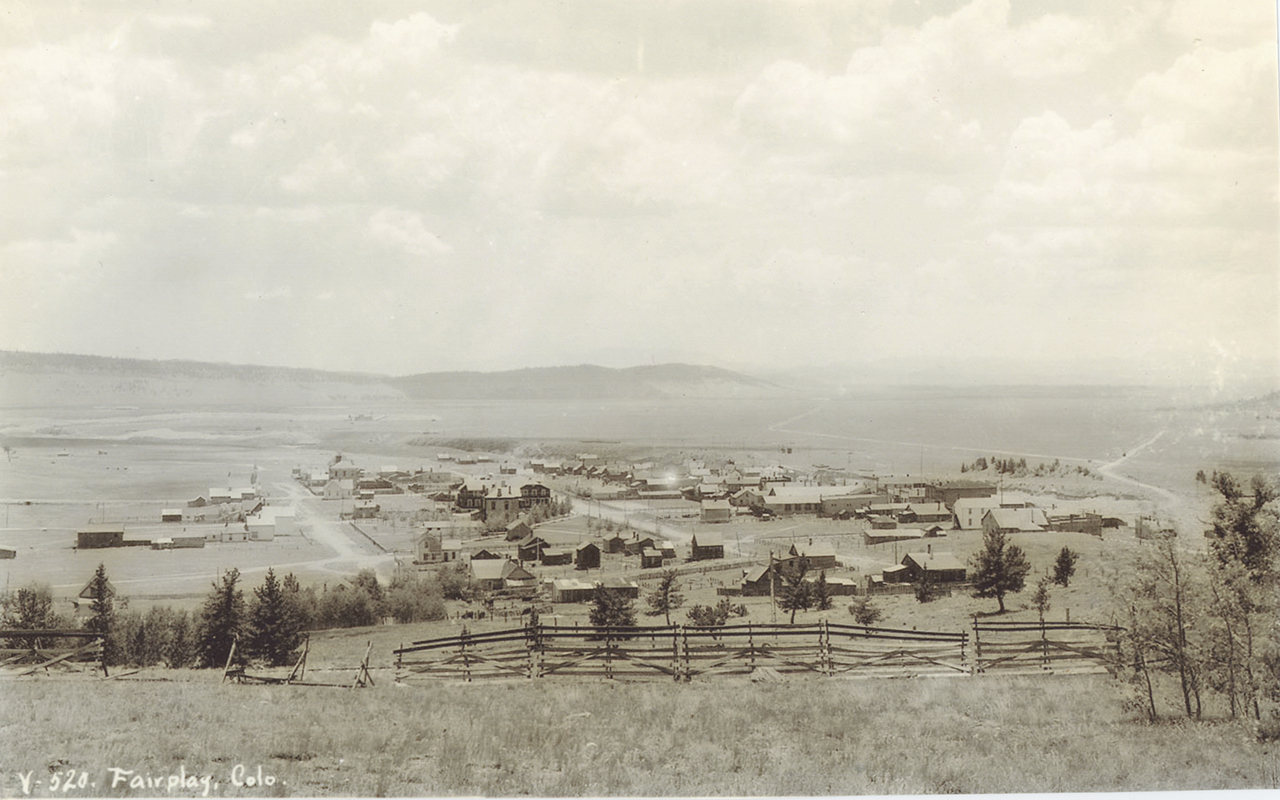
Looking over the town of Fairplay in late 1800s.

A historic gold mining settlement, the town was founded in 1859 during the early days of the Pike's Peak Gold Rush. The town was named by settlers who were upset by the generous mining claims given to the earliest prospectors and promised a more equitable system for its residents. The Fair Play, Colorado Territory, post office opened on August 2, 1861, and on November 7, 1867, county voters selected Fair Play as the new seat of Park County, Colorado Territory. The Town of Fair Play was incorporated on November 15, 1872, and changed the spelling of its name to Fairplay on October 1, 1924.

It is the largest community in the grassland basin of Colorado known as South Park, sitting on the west edge of the basin at the junction of U.S. Highway 285 and State Highway 9. It is on a hillside just east of the Middle Fork South Platte River, near where Highway 9 ascends the river valley northward to Alma and Hoosier Pass. It is a quiet town, and the roads surrounding it have a low volume of traffic. Although it was founded during the initial placer mining boom, the mines in the area continued to produce gold and silver ore for many decades up through the middle of the 20th century.

The town consists of modern retail businesses along the highway, as well as a historic town on the bluff above the river along Front Street. The northern extension of Front Street along the river has been preserved and has become the site of relocated historic structures as an open-air museum called South Park City, intended to recreate the early days of the Colorado Gold Rush. Most of the residences in town are located on the hillside west of US Highway 285 and east of State Highway 9, in the vicinity of the schools and Park County Courthouse. The majority of the streets in town were finally paved in 2005.

== Geography ==
At the 2020 United States census, the town had a total area of 740 acres (2.995 km^{2}) including 5.9 acres (0.024 km^{2}) of water.

=== Climate ===
Fairplay has a subarctic or subalpine climate (Koppen: Dfc) given its elevation, with short cool summers, and long, windy and cold winters. Temperature ranges between day and night are large, due to the high elevation, low cloud cover, and dryness of the air.

Climate data for Fairplay, 1991–2020 normals, 2003-2019 snowfall; 9995ft (3046m)
Month	Jan	Feb	Mar	Apr	May	Jun	Jul	Aug	Sep	Oct	Nov	Dec	Year
Record high °F (°C)	55 (13)	57 (14)	60 (16)	63 (17)	74 (23)	83 (28)	84 (29)	80 (27)	77 (25)	72 (22)	62 (17)	53 (12)	84 (29)
Mean maximum °F (°C)	47 (8)	46 (8)	53 (12)	59 (15)	68 (20)	78 (26)	80 (27)	76 (24)	73 (23)	66 (19)	55 (13)	47 (8)	84 (29)
Mean daily maximum °F (°C)	30.8 (−0.7)	30.9 (−0.6)	38.1 (3.4)	44.5 (6.9)	54.5 (12.5)	65.8 (18.8)	71.0 (21.7)	68.3 (20.2)	62.1 (16.7)	50.9 (10.5)	39.1 (3.9)	30.7 (−0.7)	48.9 (9.4)
Daily mean °F (°C)	20.2 (−6.6)	20.1 (−6.6)	26.9 (−2.8)	33.2 (0.7)	41.8 (5.4)	51.2 (10.7)	56.7 (13.7)	54.6 (12.6)	48.4 (9.1)	38.4 (3.6)	28.0 (−2.2)	20.2 (−6.6)	36.6 (2.6)
Mean daily minimum °F (°C)	9.7 (−12.4)	9.3 (−12.6)	15.6 (−9.1)	21.9 (−5.6)	29.1 (−1.6)	36.6 (2.6)	42.4 (5.8)	41.0 (5.0)	34.7 (1.5)	25.9 (−3.4)	16.8 (−8.4)	9.7 (−12.4)	24.4 (−4.2)
Mean minimum °F (°C)	−7 (−22)	−11 (−24)	−2 (−19)	8 (−13)	15 (−9)	29 (−2)	37 (3)	34 (1)	26 (−3)	9 (−13)	−2 (−19)	−11 (−24)	−14 (−26)
Record low °F (°C)	−20 (−29)	−28 (−33)	−11 (−24)	−5 (−21)	2 (−17)	23 (−5)	33 (1)	30 (−1)	18 (−8)	−14 (−26)	−13 (−25)	−19 (−28)	−28 (−33)
Average precipitation inches (mm)	0.65 (17)	0.66 (17)	1.10 (28)	1.35 (34)	1.78 (45)	1.13 (29)	2.40 (61)	2.22 (56)	1.44 (37)	1.01 (26)	0.63 (16)	0.73 (19)	15.1 (385)
Average snowfall inches (cm)	7.9 (20)	10.1 (26)	13.4 (34)	12.7 (32)	8.2 (21)	0.3 (0.76)	trace	trace	1.0 (2.5)	6.9 (18)	7.6 (19)	11.9 (30)	80 (203.26)
Source 1: NOAA
Source 2: XMACIS (snowfall, records & monthly max/mins)

== Demographics ==
Historical population
Census	Pop.	Note	%±
1890	301		—
1900	319		6.0%
1910	265		−16.9%
1920	183		−30.9%
1930	221		20.8%
1940	739		234.4%
1950	476		−35.6%
1960	404		−15.1%
1970	419		3.7%
1980	421		0.5%
1990	387		−8.1%
2000	610		57.6%
2010	679		11.3%
2020	724		6.6%
U.S. Decennial Census

As of the census of 2000, there were 610 people, 259 households, and 169 families residing in the town. The population density was 576 inhabitants per square mile (222/km^{2}). There were 337 housing units at an average density of 318 per square mile (123/km^{2}). The racial makeup of the town was 93% White, 1.3% African American, 1.0% Native American, 0.3% Asian, 2.8% from other races, and 1.5% from two or more races. Hispanic or Latino of any race were 4.9% of the population.

There were 259 households, out of which 32% had children under the age of 18 living with them, 51% were married couples living together, 8% had a female householder with no husband present, and 34% were non-families. 26% of all households were made up of individuals, and 3.9% had someone living alone who was 65 years of age or older. The average household size was 2.36 and the average family size was 2.8.

Approximately 24% of the town under the age of 18, 8% from 18 to 24, 37% from 25 to 44, 25% from 45 to 64, and 5% 65 years of age or older. The median age was 35 years. For every 100 females, there were 110 males. For every 100 females age 18 and over, there were 112 males.

The median income for a household in the town was $50,385, and the median income for a family was $51,980. Males had a median income of $34,290 versus $26,430 for females. The per capita income for the town was $21,740. About 6.6% of families and 9.5% of the population were below the poverty line, including 10.4% of those under age 18 and 5.4% of those age 65 or over.

== Arts and culture ==
Fairplay dredge, 1940s, the largest gold dredge in Colorado

=== Burro Days ===
The Burro Days festival is held on the last weekend of July. The event celebrates the town's mining heritage. The main feature of the festival is a 29-mile (46.7 km) burro race over rough terrain and approximately 3,000-ft (914 m) elevation gain from downtown Fairplay to the 13,185-ft (4019 m) summit of Mosquito Pass. Teams consist of one person and one burro. The race takes about five hours to complete; first prize is $1,000. Previously, the first prize included an ounce of gold. There are several other burro races in Colorado; the most notable takes place in Leadville.

The Fairplay event is the World Championship of Burro Racing, an ultra-marathon and the longest burro race in the state. For many years (in the 1960s and early 1970s) the Burro race took place from Leadville to Fairplay, or vice versa, crossing over Mosquito Pass. This followed the route that Father John Lewis Dyer of the Methodist Episcopal Church used for circuit riding and for carrying mail. With time, the rivalry between the two cities ended this cooperative endeavor.

== Infrastructure ==
=== Transportation ===
Fairplay is part of Colorado's Bustang intercity bus network. It is on the Gunnison-Denver Outrider line.

== Notable people ==
- Sheldon Jackson, Presbyterian missionary who established what is now the South Park Community Presbyterian Church in Fairplay.
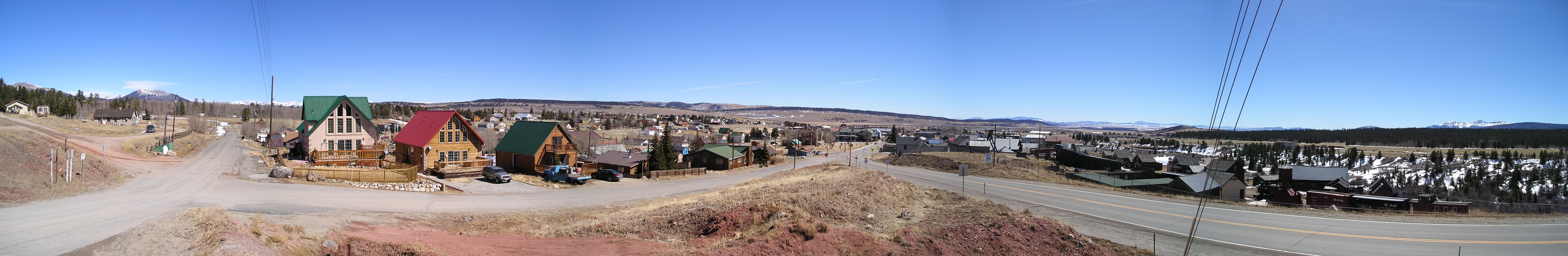
View of Fairplay and South Park.

== See also ==
- Denver-Aurora-Greeley, CO Combined Statistical Area
- Front Range Urban Corridor
