= Saguache Creek =

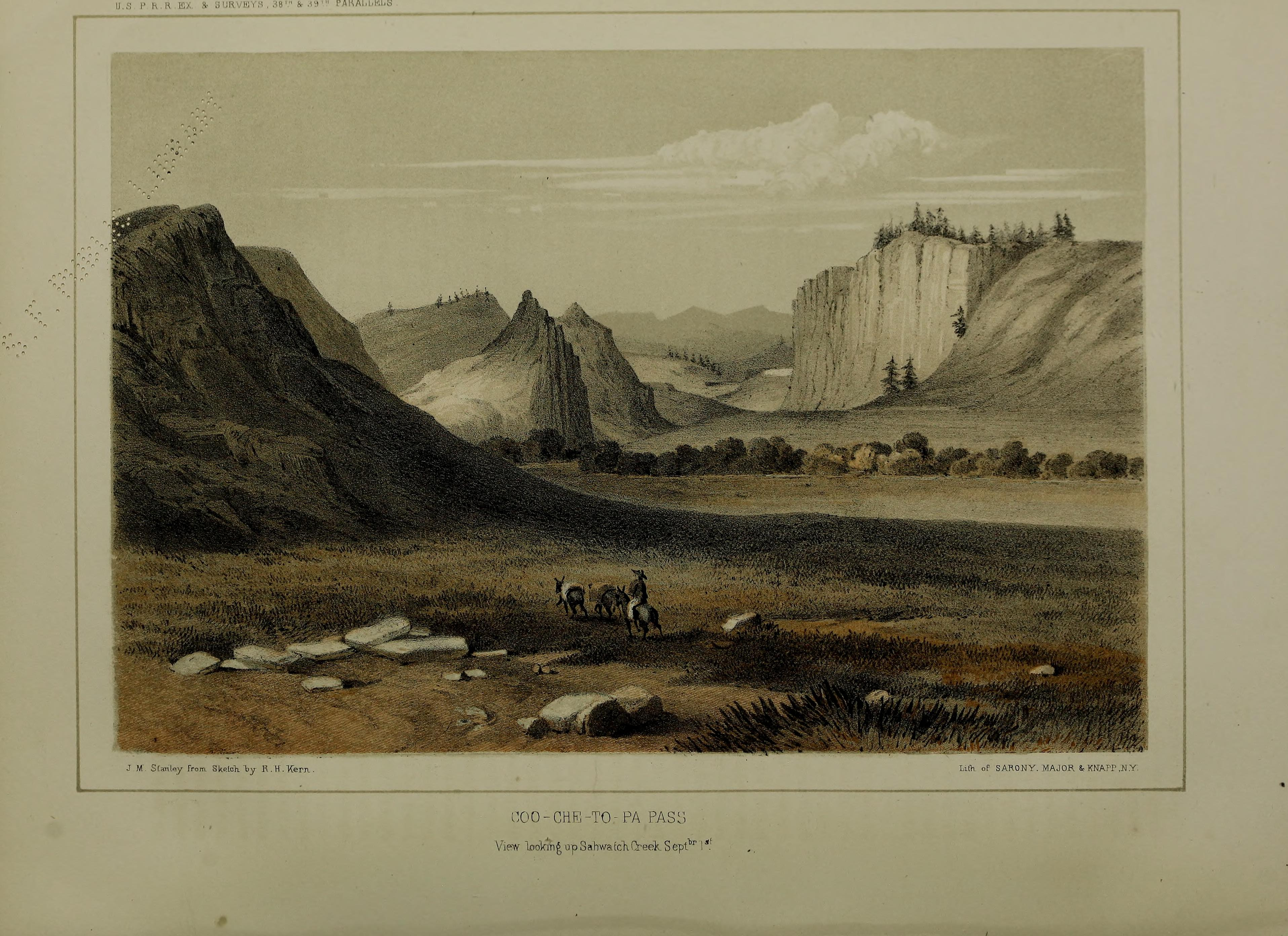
- The valley of Saguache Creek illustrated during the Pacific Railroad Surveys in 1853

Physical characteristics
- Source
  - coordinates: 38°01′06″N 106°40′47″W
- Mouth
  - location: Confluence with San Luis Creek
  - coordinates: 37°52′34″N 105°51′53″W
  - elevation: 7,539 ft (2,298 m)
- Length: 88.5 mi (142.4 km)
- Basin size: 1,345 mi^{2} (3,480 km^{2})

Saguache Creek /səˈwætʃ/ (also spelled Saquache Creek) is a stream in Saguache County, Colorado. The creek flows 88.5 miles (142.4 km) from the confluence of its North and Middle forks before joining San Luis Creek. Saguache Creek is in the San Luis Closed Basin, the largest endorheic basin in Colorado.

== See also ==
- List of rivers of Colorado
