= National Register of Historic Places listings in Park County, Colorado =

Location of Park County in Colorado

This is a list of the National Register of Historic Places listings in Park County, Colorado.

This is intended to be a complete list of the properties and districts on the National Register of Historic Places in Park County, Colorado, United States. The locations of National Register properties and districts for which the latitude and longitude coordinates are included below, may be seen in a map.

There are 29 properties and districts listed on the National Register in the county.

This National Park Service list is complete through NPS recent listings posted August 28, 2026.

== Current listings ==
	Name on the Register	Image	Date listed	Location	City or town	Description
1	Boreas Railroad Station Site	Boreas Railroad Station Site	October 28, 1993 (#93001108)	Boreas Pass Rd. northwest of Como in the Pike National Forest; 39°24′40″N 105°58′05″W	Como	
2	Buckley Ranch	Buckley Ranch	January 28, 2000 (#99001667)	County Road 59; 39°00′55″N 105°43′48″W	Hartsel	
3	Colorado Salt Works		February 2, 2001 (#01000033)	3858 U.S. Route 285; 38°57′11″N 105°56′43″W	Hartsel	
4	Como Cemetery	Como Cemetery	April 10, 2017 (#100000842)	Cty. Rd. 33; 39°19′34″N 105°54′06″W	Como vicinity	
5	Como Roundhouse, Railroad Depot and Hotel Complex	Como Roundhouse, Railroad Depot and Hotel Complex	May 20, 1983 (#83003880)	Off U.S. Route 285; 39°19′01″N 105°53′29″W	Como	Renovated Denver, South Park and Pacific Railroad roundhouse in Como, Colorado.
6	Como School	Como School	June 30, 2000 (#00000739)	Spruce St. 39°19′01″N 105°53′48″W	Como	Complex including a grade school with belltower built in 1883
7	EM Ranch		October 15, 2002 (#02001142)	County Road 439; 39°04′40″N 105°48′33″W	Hartsel	
8	Estabrook Historic District		October 20, 1980 (#80000919)	Northeast of Bailey; 39°22′51″N 105°25′42″W	Bailey	
9	Fairplay Hotel	Fairplay Hotel	January 16, 2008 (#07001395)	500 Main St. 39°13′29″N 106°00′03″W	Fairplay	
10	Glenisle	Glenisle	January 18, 1985 (#85000084)	Off U.S. Route 285; 39°24′34″N 105°30′00″W	Bailey	
11	Guiraud-McDowell Ranch	Guiraud-McDowell Ranch	April 12, 2016 (#16000154)	Colorado State Highway 9; 39°06′46″N 105°53′26″W	Garo	
12	Jefferson Denver South Park and Pacific Railroad Depot	Jefferson Denver South Park and Pacific Railroad Depot	December 31, 1998 (#98001554)	Junction of U.S. Route 285 and County Road 35; 39°22′38″N 105°48′02″W	Jefferson	
13	Paris Mill	Paris Mill	August 6, 2013 (#13000574)	Address Restricted	Alma	
14	Park County Courthouse and Jail	Park County Courthouse and Jail	May 25, 1979 (#79000618)	418 Main St. 39°13′32″N 106°00′06″W	Fairplay	
15	Salt Works Ranch	Salt Works Ranch	February 2, 2001 (#01000032)	3858 U.S. Route 285; 38°57′19″N 105°56′59″W	Hartsel	
16	Shawnee	Shawnee	July 8, 2010 (#10000434)	56016-56114 Frontage Rd.; 55919-56278 U.S. Route 285; 31-36 W. Shawnee Rd.; 54-152 Waterworks Rd. 39°25′16″N 105°53′15″W	Shawnee	
17	South Park City Museum	South Park City Museum	November 5, 2014 (#14000899)	100 4th St. 39°13′31″N 106°00′16″W	Fairplay	
18	South Park Community Church	South Park Community Church	November 22, 1977 (#77000382)	6th and Hathaway Sts. 39°13′29″N 105°59′57″W	Fairplay	
19	South Park Lager Beer Brewery	South Park Lager Beer Brewery	June 25, 1974 (#74000590)	3rd and Front Sts. 39°13′32″N 106°00′12″W	Fairplay	
20	South Platte River Bridge	South Platte River Bridge	March 22, 2018 (#100002221)	Cty. Rd. 90a over S. Platte R., mi. marker 40; 38°59′11″N 105°21′48″W	Lake George vicinity	
21	Spring House-Moynahan House		March 22, 2021 (#100006292)	53 South Pine St. 39°16′56″N 106°03′43″W	Alma	
22	Staunton Ranch-Rural Historic Landscape	Staunton Ranch-Rural Historic Landscape	December 4, 2012 (#12000991)	11559 Upper Ranch Dr. 39°30′17″N 105°23′24″W	Pine	Extends into Jefferson County
23	Summer Saloon	Summer Saloon	May 8, 1974 (#74000591)	3rd and Front Sts. 39°13′29″N 106°00′17″W	Fairplay	
24	Tarryall Rural Historic District		November 1, 2017 (#100000788)	Cty. Rd. 77, mileposts 2.4 to 33.7 & 34.6 to 41.8; 39°20′55″N 105°46′35″W	Jefferson vicinity	
25	Tarryall School	Tarryall School	May 16, 1985 (#85001060)	31000 County Rd. 39°07′14″N 105°28′25″W	Tarryall	
26	Threemile Gulch		September 13, 2011 (#11000632)	Feeding into the Middle Fork South Platte River, 3 miles (4.8 km) north of Hartsel; 39°03′42″N 105°47′34″W	Hartsel	
27	Trout Creek-Annex-Settele Ranch		April 29, 2008 (#08000345)	3242 County Road 7; 39°07′33″N 105°54′11″W	Fairplay	
28	Wahl Ranch	Wahl Ranch	October 12, 2000 (#00001194)	U.S. Route 285 and Lost Park Rd. 39°23′31″N 105°47′23″W	Jefferson	
29	Victor Williams Homestead-Sprague Sand Creek Ranch		February 6, 2024 (#100009925)	25700 County Road 77; 39°12′10″N 105°33′53″W	Lake George	

== See also ==
- List of National Historic Landmarks in Colorado
- List of National Register of Historic Places in Colorado
- Bibliography of Colorado
- Geography of Colorado
- History of Colorado
- Index of Colorado-related articles
- List of Colorado-related lists
- Outline of Colorado
