= Boreas Railroad Station Site =

Historic site in Colorado, US

- U.S. National Register of Historic Places
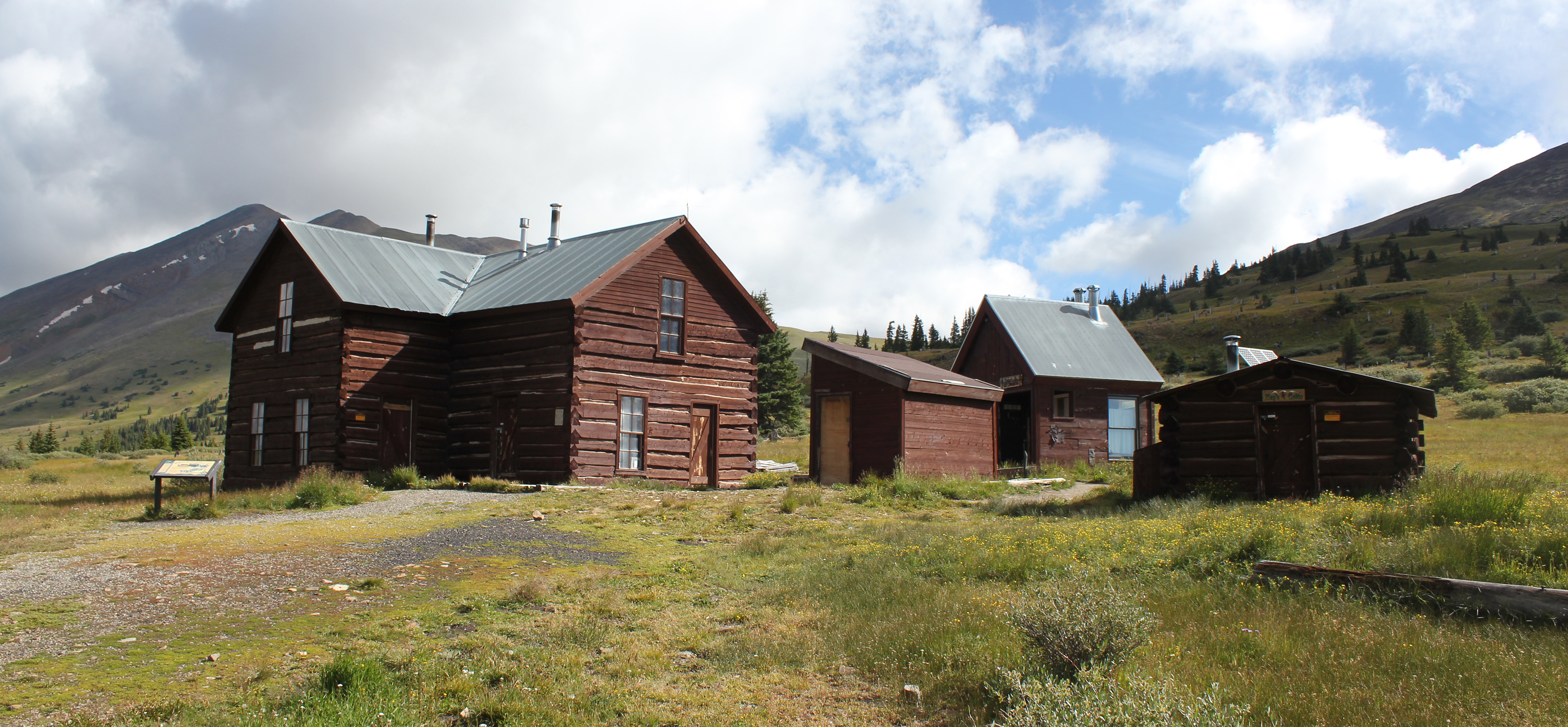

- Location within Colorado
- Location: Boreas Pass Rd. northwest of Como, Colorado in the Pike National Forest
- Area: 19 acres (7.7 ha)
- Built: 1881
- Built by: Denver, South Park & Pacific Railroad
- NRHP reference No.: 93001108
- Added to NRHP: October 28, 1993

The Boreas Railroad Station Site is a 19 acres (7.7 ha) site in Pike National Forest near Como, Colorado, United States, which was listed on the National Register of Historic Places in 1993. The listed area spans the border of Park and Summit counties.

The site, at 11,498 feet (3,505 m) elevation, is at Boreas Pass, which the Denver, South Park & Pacific Railroad narrow-gauge line crossed in 1893 by a "twisty route".

A post office operated there from 1896 to 1905.

The listing includes two contributing buildings and a contributing site. The site is deemed significant for its potential to yield information.
