= Spinney Mountain State Park =

State park in Park County, Colorado

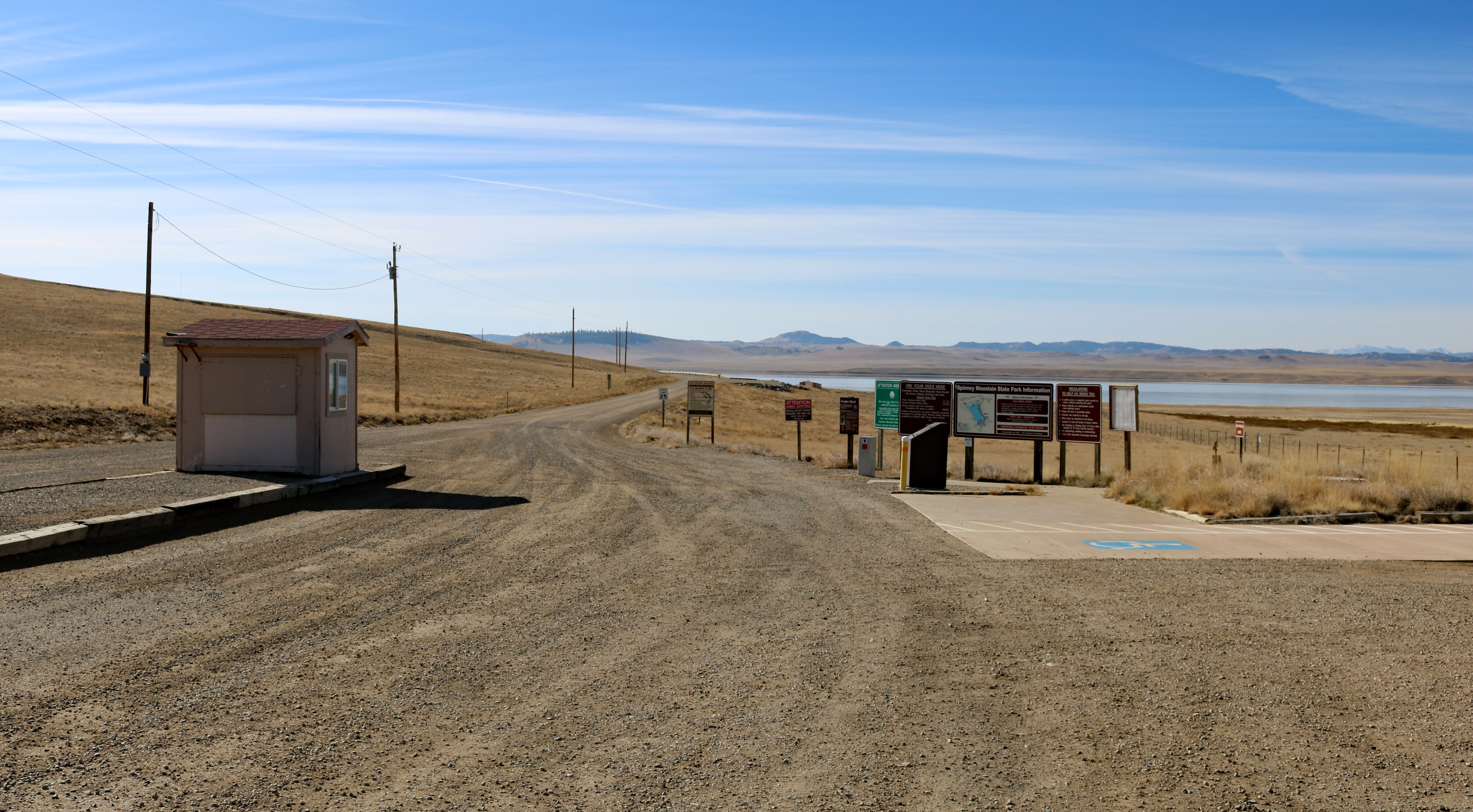
- One of the park's entrance areas

- Location within Colorado
- Location: Park County, Colorado, United States
- Nearest city: Hartsel, Colorado
- Coordinates: 39°00′08″N 105°37′52″W
- Area: 6,080 acres (24.6 km^{2})
- Established: 1987
- Visitors: 161,531 (in 2021)
- Governing body: Colorado Parks and Wildlife

Spinney Mountain State Park is a Colorado state park located in South Park in Park County, Colorado, United States.

The park centers on the Spinney Mountain Reservoir, which is popular with anglers. The reservoir and surrounding land are owned by the City of Aurora, Colorado. The reservoir, built in 1981, is the largest reservoir owned by Aurora, and it provides the majority of the Aurora water supply. The park itself is managed by Colorado Parks and Wildlife. At high water, the reservoir's surface lies at 8,710 feet (2,650 meters) above sea level. It has a capacity of 53,651 acre-feet (66,178,000 cubic meters).

== Fishing ==
Spinney Mountain Reservoir provides great fishing for rainbow trout and northern pike, and sometimes brown trout as well. The park closes for the winter when the reservoir freezes over and opens around mid-April.

== Name ==
The park takes its name from nearby Spinney Mountain, elevation 9,488 feet (2,892 meters).
