= EM Ranch =

Historic ranch in Park County, Colorado

- U.S. National Register of Historic Places
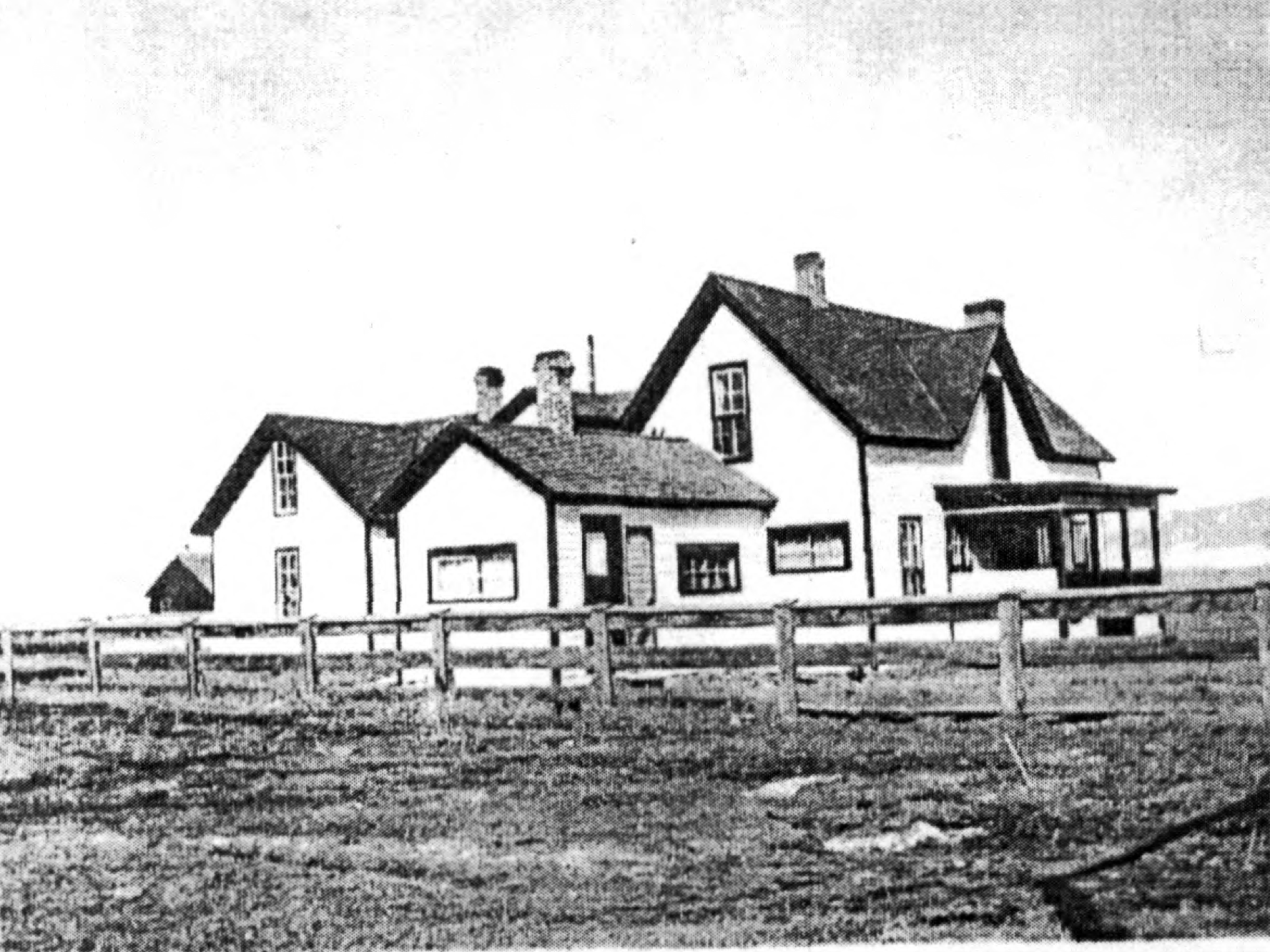
- EM Ranch, Main Ranchhouse, c.1906–1910

- Location within Colorado
- Location: County Road 439, Park County, Colorado near Hartsel, Colorado
- Coordinates: 39.06428°N 105.82310°W
- Area: 2,320 acres (9.4 km^{2})
- Built: 1874
- Architectural style: Wood frame and log-constructed
- MPS: Ranching Resources of South Park, Colorado MPS
- NRHP reference No.: 02001142
- Added to NRHP: October 15, 2002

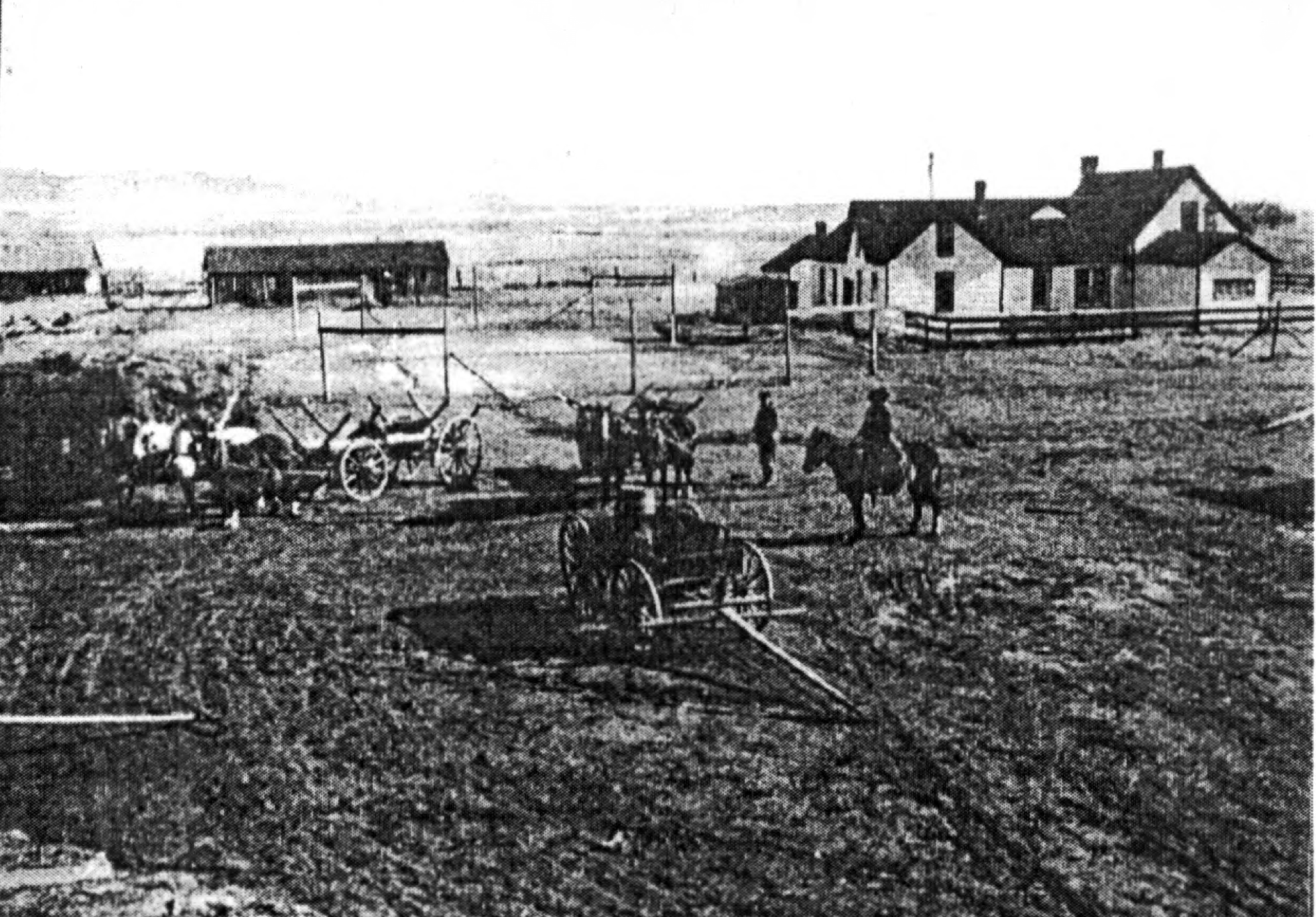
EM Ranch Headquarters looking East, c.1906–1910

The EM Ranch is a site of springs that was homesteaded and became a hay, cattle and sheep ranch in Park County, Colorado, United States, near Harstel. Established in 1874, it was listed on the National Register of Historic Places in 2002. It is now known as Santa Maria Ranch.

EM Ranch was renamed the Santa Maria Ranch in the 1950s. The new name refers to the Santa Maria Springs that are located on the ranch property. It is a site of historical significance as an agricultural complex. It is located 3.4 miles from the town of Hartsel, approximately 500 feet (150 m) to the north of the South Platte River's Middle Fork. The elevation of the ranch is 8,900 feet (2,700 m).

== Description ==
The ranch was established as a homestead in 1874 by Hardy Epperson; later H.P. Epperson operated the ranch. It is a significant example of historical ranch life in South Park, Colorado. The main period of significance is from 1874 to 1948.

The 2,320-acre site of the ranch complex has open vistas, grazing lands and large meadows that are typical of the ranches in the area. The Santa Maria Spring is located near the river 500 feet (150 m) to the northwest of the main cluster of buildings in the complex.

The ranch complex includes various buildings with dedicated utilitarian and domestic purposes. All structures are log-constructed or wood frame in construction. The draft horse barn was built from hand-hewn timber in a post-and-beam configuration. Other buildings include a livestock shed and scale house surrounded by a metal corral.

The main Victorian-era vernacular ranchhouse was log-constructed between the 1870s and 1880. It is one-and-a-half stories high with a gabled roof. It has an L-shaped floor plan. The total area of the home, inclusive of both stories, is 2,790 square feet. There are seven brick chimneys. Off the main bedroom on the first floor, there is a small room with a well, and a small warm spring.

Near the main house is a wood-frame bunkhouse, a blacksmith shop, modern wooden equipment shed, frame-built chicken coop, a well house and two outhouses. Set aside from the main cluster of buildings are a log cabin and associated outhouse. Parts of the historical ranch structures have modern additions; they are they have been kept up well, and are in "good to fair" condition. The site also includes the foundations of buildings that had burned or fallen down in the past.

An oral history was recorded in 2002 of Maurice Ownbey who one of the ranch hands who worked at the ranch from 1939 to 1944. In the interview he described how "big city gangsters would pay farmers and ranchers several hundred dollars per month to set up and operate hidden distilleries on their land." He described the illegal whiskey-making process that took place on the ranch.

=== Santa Maria warm spring ===
The hydrothermal warm spring is located near the main cluster of structures, about 500 feet from the ranchhouse. The spring water emerges form the source at 78 °F (26 °C). The spring was mainly used for bathing and watering stock. It is enclosed in a structure built from a 36 inches (910 mm)-diameter metal pipe set into the source of the spring for an unknown depth. It was described as being 40 feet deep in an article published by the Fairplay Flume newspaper, that also noted that H.P. Epperson was doing work to improve the flow of the spring. There were also improvements to maintain the warm temperature by insuring that the geothermally heated water did not mix with the water from nearby cold springs. A 1912 article mentioned that there was a bathhouse on site.

=== Location ===
The Ranch Complex is located on County Road 439, Park County, Colorado near Hartsel, Colorado. The ranch property also includes a riparian habitat and extensive wetlands.
