= Shawnee, Colorado =

Unincorporated community in Park County, Colorado, United States

- Unincorporated community
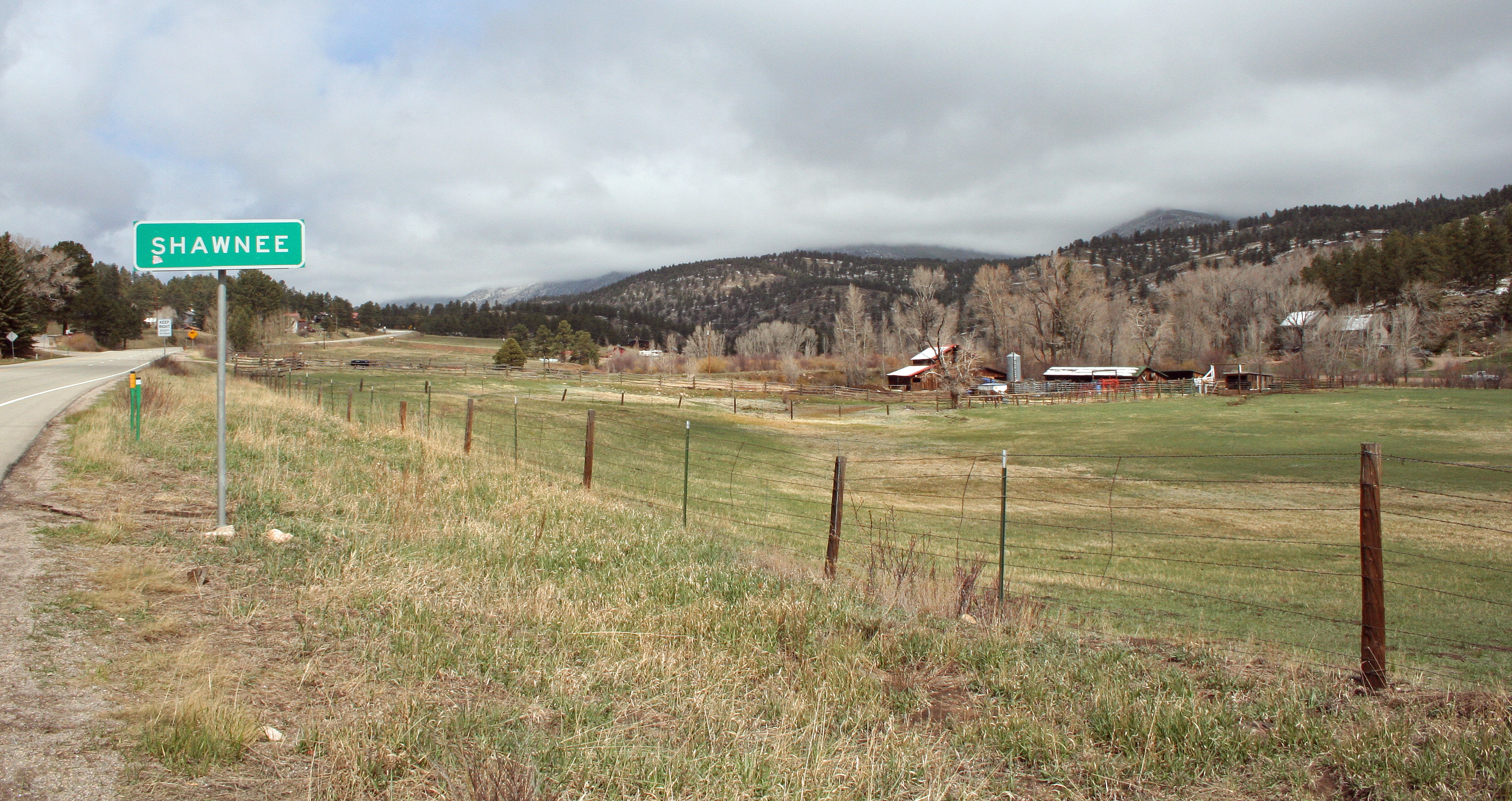
- Entering Shawnee from the east along U.S. Route 285 in May 2010

- Location in of Shawnee in Colorado and the United States Shawnee, Colorado (the United States)
- Coordinates: 39°25′12″N 105°33′06″W
- Country: United States
- State: Colorado
- County: Park County
- Elevation: 8,120 ft (2,470 m)
- Time zone: UTC-7 (MST)
  - Summer (DST): UTC-6 (MDT)
- ZIP code: 80475
- GNIS feature ID: 183232
- Shawnee Historic District
- U.S. National Register of Historic Places
- U.S. Historic district
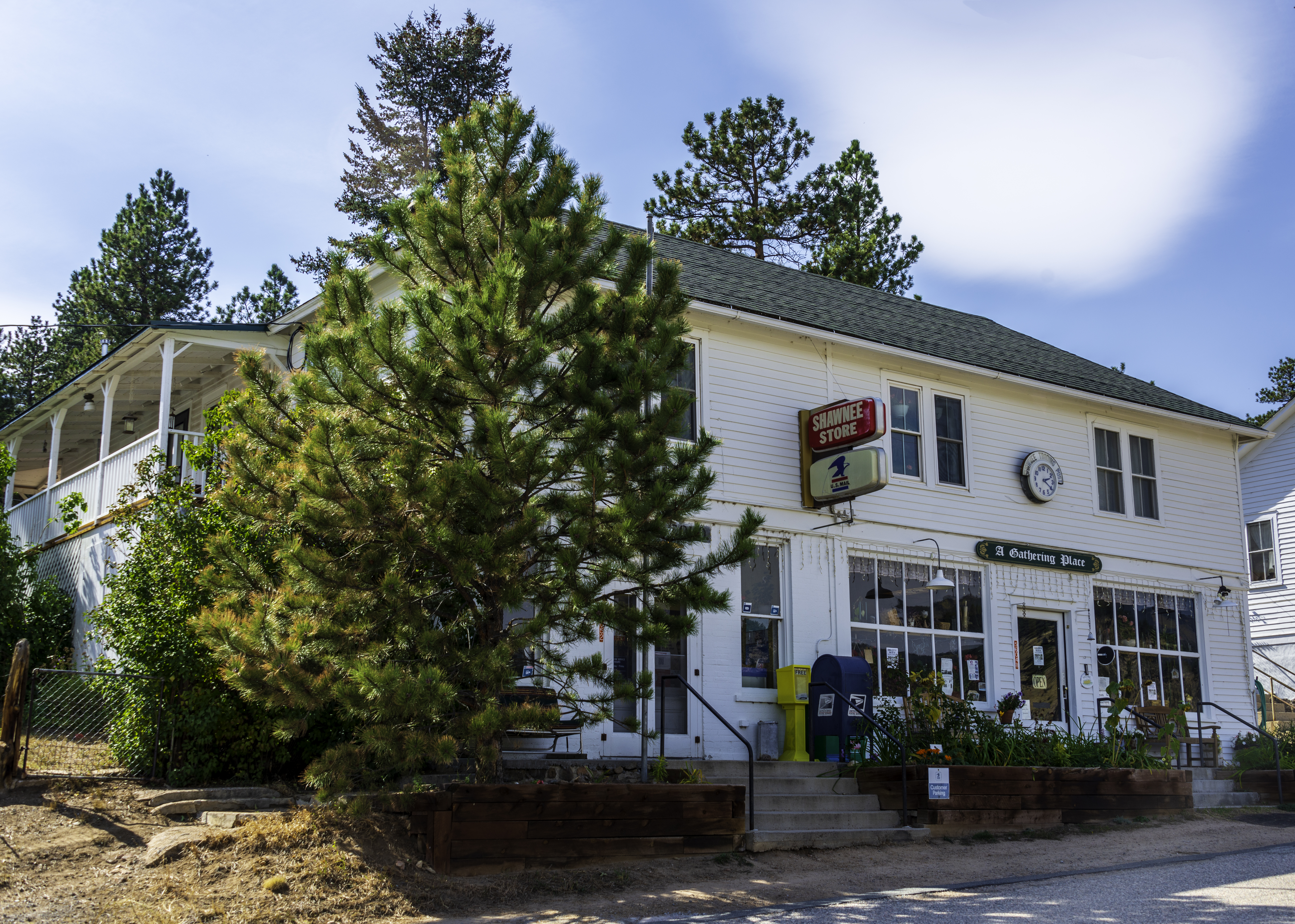
- Shawnee Store in 1911
- Location: 56016-56114 Frontage Road; 55919-56278 U.S. Route 285; 31-36 West Shawnee Road; 54-152 Waterworks Road
- Architect: Multiple
- NRHP reference No.: 10000434
- Added to NRHP: July 8, 2010

Shawnee is an unincorporated community and post office in northern Park County, Colorado, United States, that is a historic district listed on the National Register of Historic Places (NRHP).

== Description ==
Shawnee is situated along the North Fork South Platte River, west of Bailey on U.S. Route 285.

The historical district of Shawnee consists of Time Capsule Framing & Art, Shawnee Mountain Gallery, a post office, the Shawnee Cemetery, and surrounding houses, on the hillside south of the highway overlooking the river valley.

Shawnee also consists of award winning fly fishing ranches, Ben Tyler Trail, and the subdivisions, Singleton and Belford Heights.

== History ==
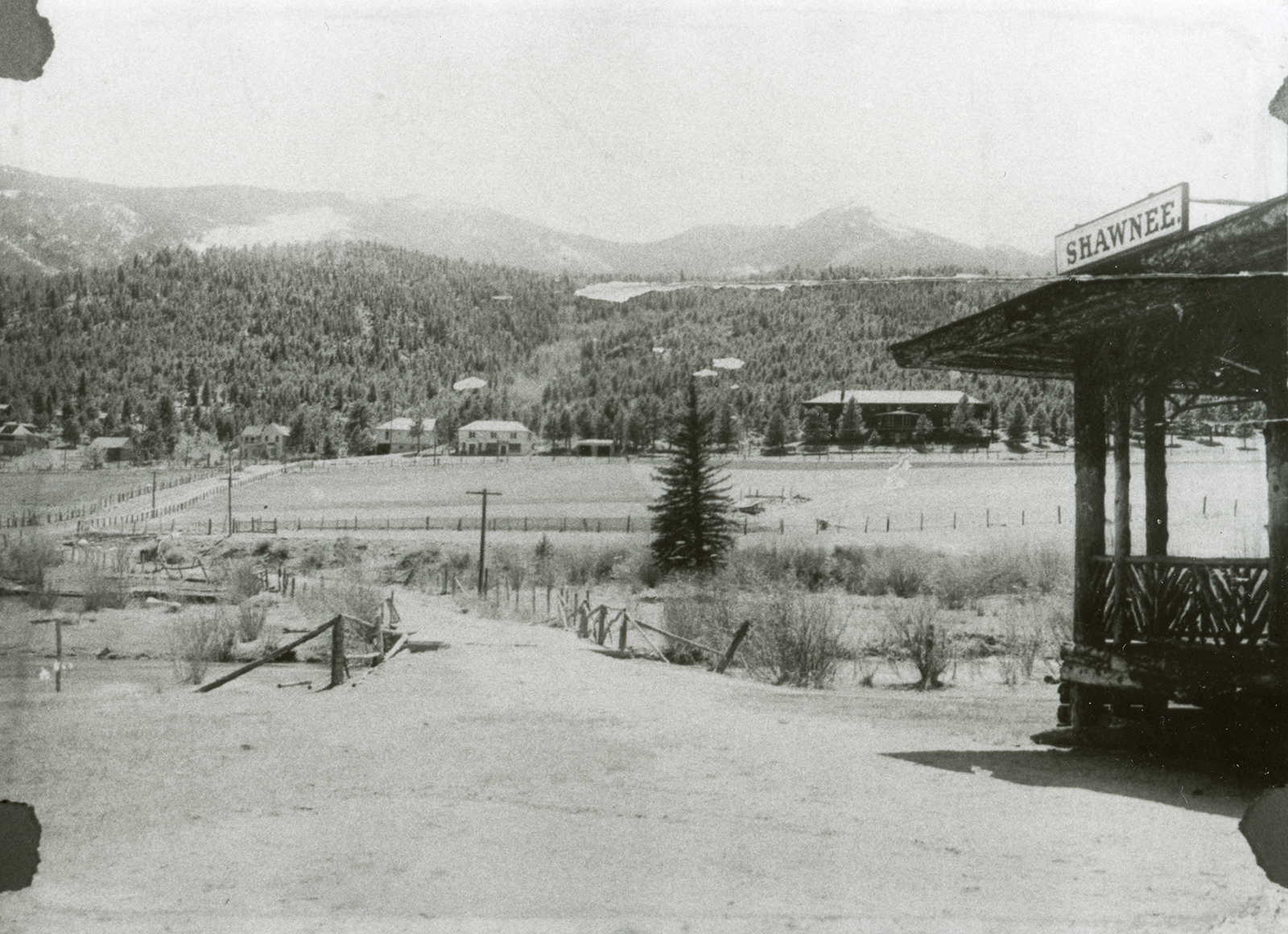
Shawnee town and railroad station taken in the 1880s.

A post office named Fairville, Colorado opened on September 13, 1878. The Fairville post office was renamed Slaghts on February 23, 1882, and was then moved a half mile (800 m) and renamed Shawnee on April 19,1900. The community takes its name from nearby Shawnee Peak.

The Shawnee Historic District was added to the NRHP July 8, 2010.

== See also ==
- National Register of Historic Places listings in Park County, Colorado
