= Como Roundhouse, Railroad Depot and Hotel Complex =

- U.S. National Register of Historic Places
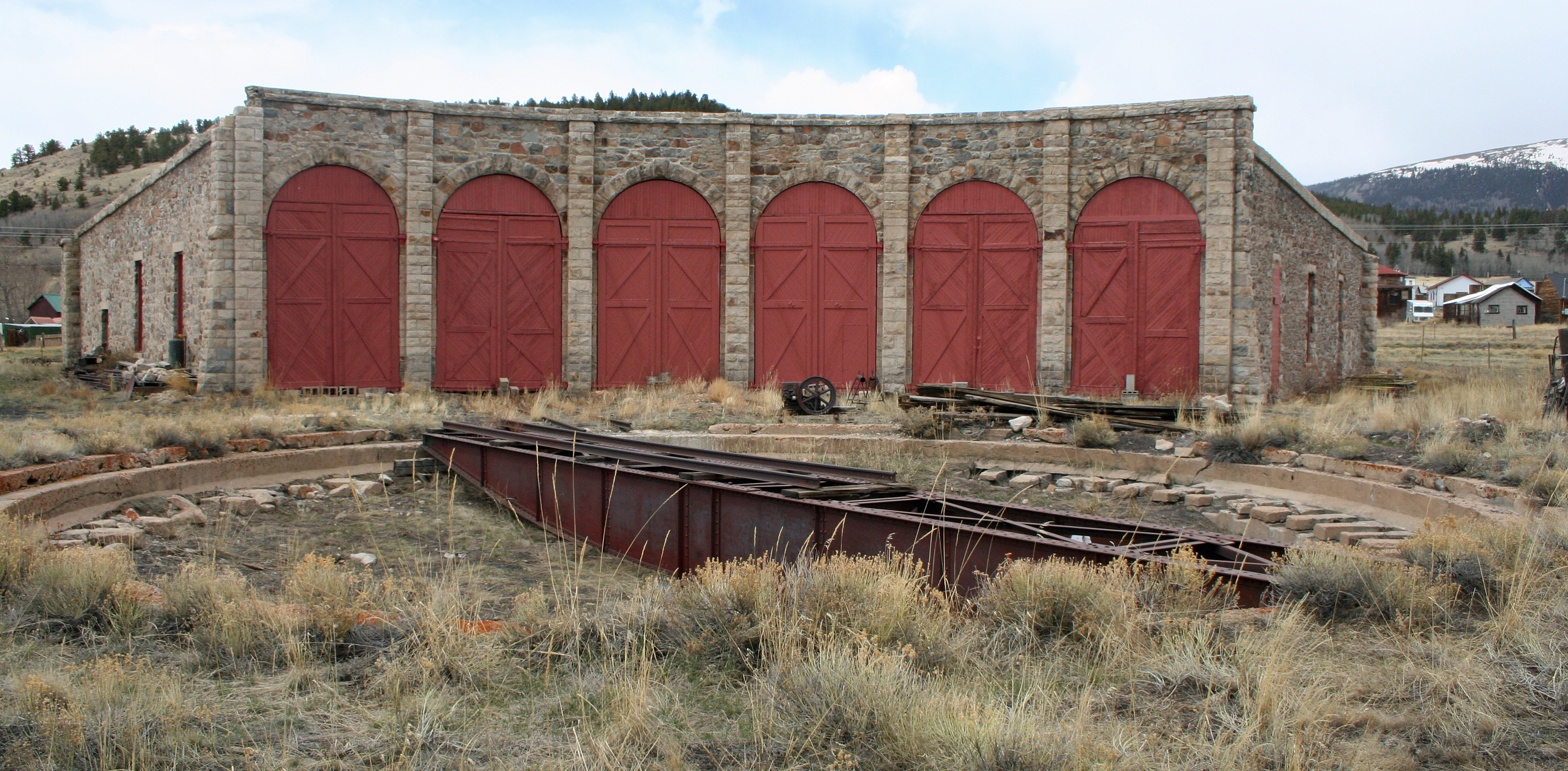
- The roundhouse.

- Location within Colorado Location within the United States
- Location: Off US 285, Como, Colorado
- Coordinates: 39°19′1″N 105°53′29″W
- Area: 5 acres (2.0 ha)
- Built: 1879-1881
- Architectural style: Colonial Revival, Georgian Revival
- NRHP reference No.: 83003880
- Added to NRHP: May 20, 1983

The Como Roundhouse, Railroad Depot and Hotel Complex is a collection of historic buildings in Como, Colorado.

== History ==
The 3 ft (914 mm) narrow gauge Denver, South Park and Pacific Railroad (DSPPR) reached Como in June 1879. The year 1881 saw construction of the Como Roundhouse, and it is believed to have been built by Italian stonemasons who had settled in the Como area. The original stone section remains, preservation work was undertaken to the walls and roof in the 1980s.

The Depot was constructed in 1879 and soon thereafter extended to its current L shape. It has been restored for use as a seasonal museum by the Denver, South Park & Pacific Historical Society.

The first Hotel on the site was the Gilman, which opened for business on New Year's Eve 1880. The Gilman was extended in 1882/3 and then taken over by the Union Pacific's hotel division in 1885. They improved the building, rebuilding and extending it. In November 1896 the building burned to the ground.

Bricks salvaged from the fire and part of the foundation were used in building the existing hotel, which was called the South Park Hotel by the Railroad.

The last train through Como was in April 1937; the tracks were pulled up the following year. Track has now been relaid connecting the Depot and Roundhouse roughly 800 ft to the southeast. An operational locomotive, Klondike Kate, now resides in it.
