= Trump, Colorado =

- Ghost town
- Location within Colorado Location within the United States
- Coordinates: 38°50′57″N 105°47′18″W
- Country: United States
- State: Colorado
- County: Park County
- Elevation: 9,436 ft (2,876 m)
- Time zone: UTC-7 (MST)
  - Summer (DST): UTC-6 (MDT)
- GNIS feature ID: 191366

Trump is a ghost town in Park County, Colorado, United States.

== History ==
Trump was an agricultural and ranching settlement which prospered during the 1920s and early 1930s.

Trump had a store, and a post office which served neighboring ranches. Trump also hosted rodeo competitions between local ranch hands.

The population of Trump had declined to three people by 1936.

In 1937, J. H. Johnson identified a unique sandstone in the vicinity and named it "Trump conglomerate" after the nearby settlement.
