= Tarryall School =

- U.S. National Register of Historic Places
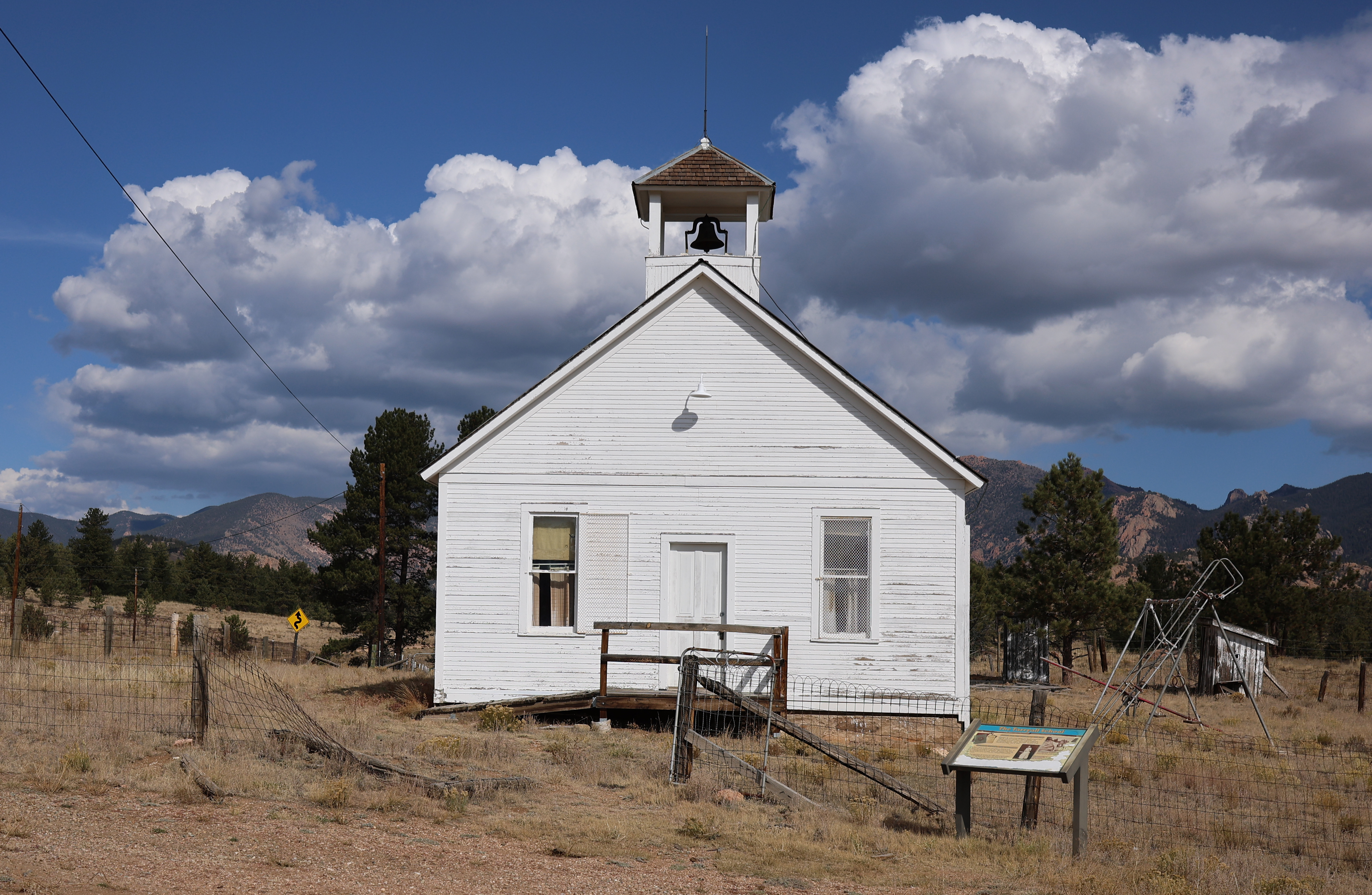
- Schoolhouse in 2024

- Location within Colorado
- Location: 31000 County Road 77, Tarryall, Colorado
- Coordinates: 39°07′14″N 105°28′25″W
- Area: 0.5 acres (0.20 ha)
- Built: 1921
- Built by: Parker, Ollie
- MPS: Rural School Buildings in Colorado MPS
- NRHP reference No.: 85001060
- Added to NRHP: May 16, 1985

The Tarryall School, at 31000 County Road 77 in Tarryall, Colorado (formerly known as Puma City), was built in 1921. It was listed on the National Register of Historic Places in 1985.

The school is a white one-room schoolhouse, which replaced a previous school on the site. It was built by volunteers supervised by Ollie Parker, a carpenter. The property also includes a teacherage.

It served as a school from 1921 to 1949. Its highest enrollment was 35 pupils in 1908–1909.
