= Estabrook Historic District =

Historic district in Colorado, United States

- U.S. National Register of Historic Places
- Location within Colorado Location within the United States
- Nearest city: Bailey, Colorado
- Coordinates: 39°22′51″N 105°25′42″W
- Area: 272 acres (110 ha)
- Built: 1872
- Architectural style: Western rustic style
- NRHP reference No.: 80000919
- Added to NRHP: October 20, 1980

The Estabrook Historic District, southeast of Bailey, Colorado, is a 272-acre (110 ha) historic district which was listed on the National Register of Historic Places in 1980.

It was deemed

significant for its association with the Denver South Park & Pacific Railway and the tourist industry that developed at some points along the line. The District is also significant for its architectural features, notably the excellent examples of the rustic style seen in the Rocky Mountains, and for its association with some of the state's most important pioneers.

It is a former community on the North Fork of the South Platte River which has rustic stone and wood buildings and structures, including ice houses, barns and other outbuildings, which was at the Estabrook stop of the Denver South Park & Pacific Railway. It includes a small railroad bridge which is believed to be the only surviving original bridge of that railway. It is entirely privately owned property, although nearly surrounded by the Pike National Forest.

The district included ten contributing buildings and a contributing structure on 272 acres (110 ha).
