= Como School =

- U.S. National Register of Historic Places
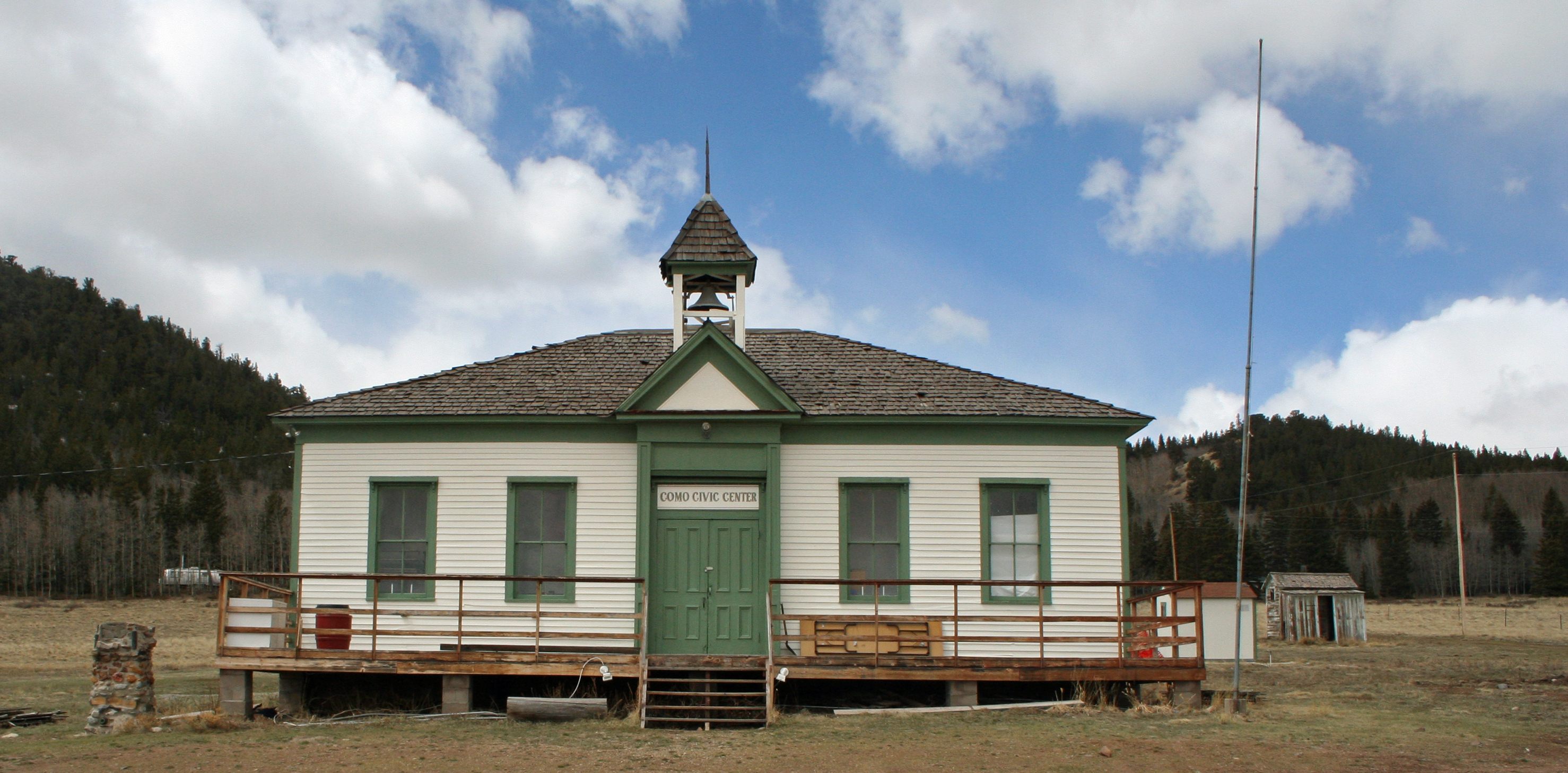
- Building labelled "Como Civic Center" in 2010

- Location within Colorado
- Location: Spruce St., Como, Colorado
- Coordinates: 39°19′01″N 105°53′48″W
- Area: 1.1 acres (0.45 ha)
- Built: 1883
- MPS: Rural School Buildings in Colorado MPS
- NRHP reference No.: 00000739
- Added to NRHP: June 30, 2000

The Como School, on Spruce St. in Como, Colorado, is a school complex its oldest building, a grade school with a belltower, built in 1883. It was listed on the National Register of Historic Places in 2000.

The grade school building is a wood-frame structure that was a one-room schoolhouse, serving students in grades one through four on one side of the aisle and grades five through eight on the other.

The property also included a wood frame high school building which was moved to the property in the 1930s, two outhouses, and a storage shed.

The school operated from 1883 to 1948. In 2010 the grade school building was identified as the Como Civic Center.
