= Park County, Colorado =

County in Colorado, United States

- County
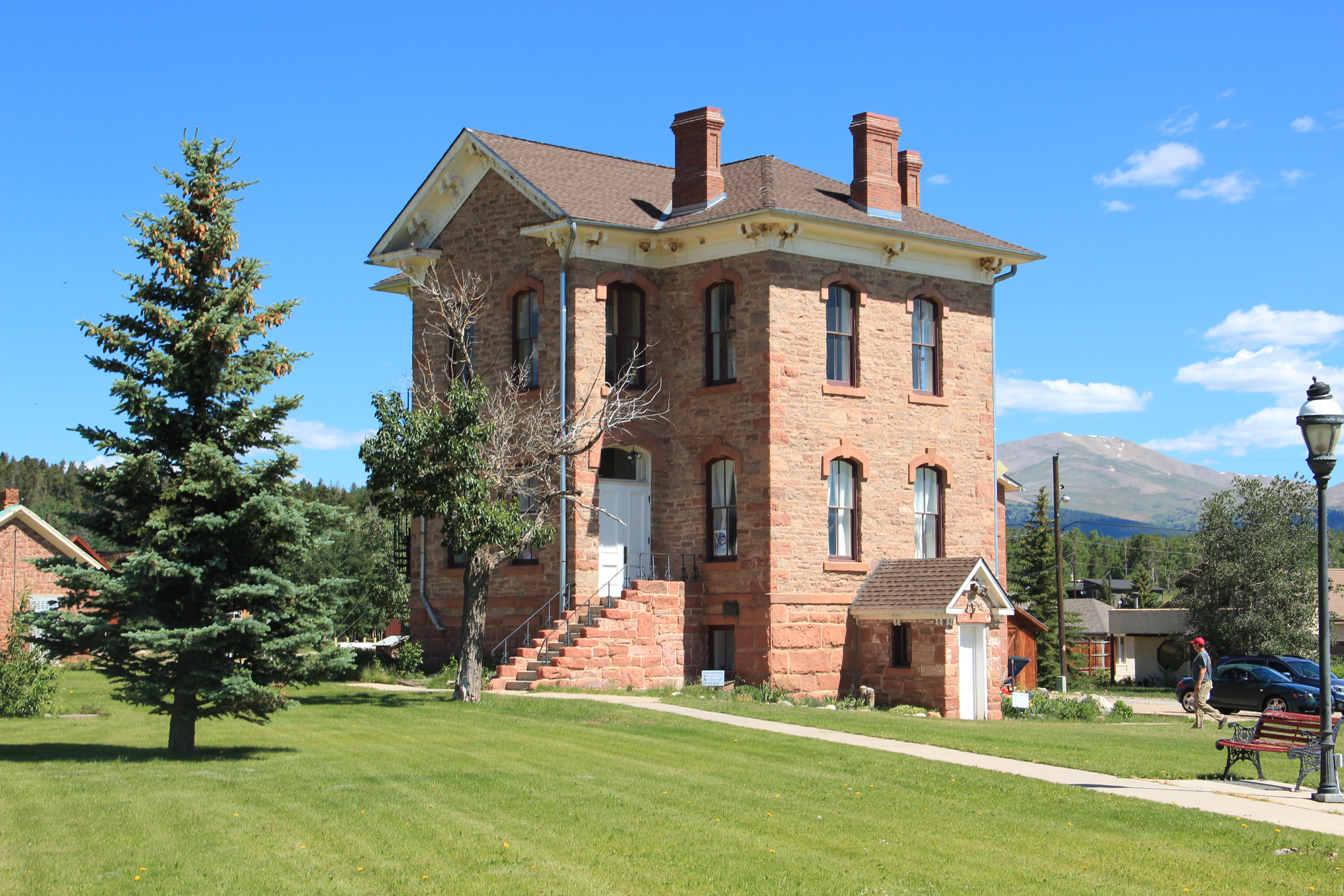
- Old Park County Courthouse

- Location within the U.S. state of Colorado
- Coordinates: 39.12°N 105.71°W
- Country: United States
- State: Colorado
- Founded: November 1, 1861
- Seat: Fairplay
- Largest town: Fairplay

Area
  - Total: 2,211 sq mi (5,730 km^{2})
  - Land: 2,194 sq mi (5,680 km^{2})
  - Water: 17 sq mi (44 km^{2}) 0.8%

Population (2020)
  - Total: 17,390
  - Estimate (2025): 18,314 ▲
  - Density: 7.926/sq mi (3.060/km^{2})
- Time zone: UTC−7 (Mountain)
  - Summer (DST): UTC−6 (MDT)
- Congressional district: 7th
- Website: www.parkcountyco.gov

Park County is a county located in the U.S. state of Colorado. As of the 2020 census, the population was 17,390. The county seat and largest incorporated town is Fairplay, while the unincorporated community of Bailey is the largest settlement overall. The county was named after the large geographic region known as South Park, which was named by early fur traders and trappers in the area. Park County is included in the Denver–Aurora–Lakewood, CO Metropolitan Statistical Area. A majority of the county lies within the boundaries of the South Park National Heritage Area.

== Geography ==
At the 2020 United States census, the county had a total area of 2,211 square miles (5,730 km^{2}), of which 2,194 square miles (5,680 km^{2}) is land and 17 square miles (44 km^{2}) (0.8%) is water.

The geographic center of the State of Colorado is located in Park County at coordinates 38.9972°N 105.5478°W. The headwaters of the South Platte River are located in Park County at coordinates 39.0111°N 105.7403°W.

=== Adjacent counties ===
- Clear Creek County - north
- Jefferson County - northeast
- Teller County - east
- Fremont County - southeast
- Chaffee County - southwest
- Lake County - west
- Summit County - northwest

=== Major highways ===
- U.S. Highway 24
- U.S. Highway 285
- State Highway 9

=== National protected areas ===
- Buffalo Peaks Wilderness
- Lost Creek Wilderness
- Pike National Forest
- San Isabel National Forest

=== State protected areas ===
- Eleven Mile State Park
- Spinney Mountain State Park
- Staunton State Park

=== Trails and byways ===
- American Discovery Trail
- Colorado Trail
- Continental Divide National Scenic Trail
- Great Parks Bicycle Route
- Guanella Pass Scenic Byway
- TransAmerica Trail Bicycle Route

== Demographics ==
Historical population
Census	Pop.	Note	%±
1870	447		—
1880	3,970		788.1%
1890	3,548		−10.6%
1900	2,998		−15.5%
1910	2,492		−16.9%
1920	1,977		−20.7%
1930	2,052		3.8%
1940	3,272		59.5%
1950	1,870		−42.8%
1960	1,822		−2.6%
1970	2,185		19.9%
1980	5,333		144.1%
1990	7,174		34.5%
2000	14,523		102.4%
2010	16,206		11.6%
2020	17,390		7.3%
2025 (est.)	18,314	▲	5.3%
U.S. Decennial Census; 1790-1960 1900-1990; 1990-2000 2010-2020

=== 2020 census ===
As of the 2020 census, the county had a population of 17,390. Of the residents, 16.1% were under the age of 18 and 21.3% were 65 years of age or older; the median age was 49.5 years. Only 3.6% of the population was below the age of five. For every 100 females there were 112.9 males, and for every 100 females age 18 and over there were 113.2 males. 0.0% of residents lived in urban areas and 100.0% lived in rural areas.

Park County, Colorado – Racial and ethnic composition Note: the US Census treats Hispanic/Latino as an ethnic category. This table excludes Latinos from the racial categories and assigns them to a separate category. Hispanics/Latinos may be of any race.
Race / Ethnicity (NH = Non-Hispanic)	Pop 2000	Pop 2010	Pop 2020	% 2000	% 2010	% 2020
White alone (NH)	13,431	14,842	14,902	92.48%	91.58%	85.69%
Black or African American alone (NH)	67	69	89	0.46%	0.43%	0.51%
Native American or Alaska Native alone (NH)	101	117	118	0.70%	0.72%	0.68%
Asian alone (NH)	60	99	99	0.41%	0.61%	0.57%
Pacific Islander alone (NH)	3	2	9	0.02%	0.01%	0.05%
Other race alone (NH)	21	14	94	0.14%	0.09%	0.54%
Mixed race or Multiracial (NH)	212	280	844	1.46%	1.73%	4.85%
Hispanic or Latino (any race)	628	783	1,235	4.32%	4.83%	7.10%
Total	14,523	16,206	17,390	100.00%	100.00%	100.00%

The racial makeup of the county was 88.1% White, 0.5% Black or African American, 1.0% American Indian and Alaska Native, 0.6% Asian, 0.1% Native Hawaiian and Pacific Islander, 1.9% from some other race, and 7.8% from two or more races. Hispanic or Latino residents of any race comprised 7.1% of the population.

There were 7,810 households in the county, of which 20.5% had children under the age of 18 living with them and 14.7% had a female householder with no spouse or partner present. About 27.2% of all households were made up of individuals and 10.4% had someone living alone who was 65 years of age or older.

There were 14,112 housing units, of which 44.7% were vacant. Among occupied housing units, 87.0% were owner-occupied and 13.0% were renter-occupied. The homeowner vacancy rate was 2.6% and the rental vacancy rate was 8.8%.

=== 2000 census ===
According to the census of 2000, there were 14,523 people, 5,894 households, and 4,220 families living in the county. The population density was 7 people per square mile (2.7 people/km^{2}). There were 10,697 housing units at an average density of 5 units per square mile (1.9 units/km^{2}). The racial makeup of the county was 95.07% White, 0.50% Black or African American, 0.92% Native American, 0.41% Asian, 0.03% Pacific Islander, 1.23% from other races, and 1.84% from two or more races. 4.32% of the population were Hispanic or Latino of any race.

There were 5,894 households, out of which 30.20% had children under the age of 18 living with them, 64.10% were married couples living together, 4.40% had a female householder with no husband present, and 28.40% were non-families. 21.10% of all households were made up of individuals, and 3.20% had someone living alone who was 65 years of age or older. The average household size was 2.45 and the average family size was 2.86.

In the county, the population was spread out, with 23.50% under the age of 18, 5.10% from 18 to 24, 33.40% from 25 to 44, 30.60% from 45 to 64, and 7.30% who were 65 years of age or older. The median age was 40 years. For every 100 females there were 107.10 males. For every 100 females age 18 and over, there were 107.60 males.

The median income for a household in the county was $51,899, and the median income for a family was $57,025. Males had a median income of $41,480 versus $27,807 for females. The per capita income for the county was $25,019. About 3.40% of families and 5.60% of the population were below the poverty line, including 5.60% of those under age 18 and 5.70% of those age 65 or over.

== Politics ==
United States presidential election results for Park County, Colorado
Year	Republican		Democratic		Third party(ies)	
Year	No.	%	No.	%	No.	%
1880	698	52.60%	598	45.06%	31	2.34%
1884	777	54.45%	629	44.08%	21	1.47%
1888	764	56.30%	588	43.33%	5	0.37%
1892	384	36.92%	0	0.00%	656	63.08%
1896	151	8.78%	1,562	90.81%	7	0.41%
1900	579	37.89%	940	61.52%	9	0.59%
1904	685	49.25%	669	48.09%	37	2.66%
1908	465	35.58%	807	61.74%	35	2.68%
1912	293	29.87%	529	53.92%	159	16.21%
1916	372	34.48%	674	62.47%	33	3.06%
1920	511	58.20%	320	36.45%	47	5.35%
1924	660	56.12%	316	26.87%	200	17.01%
1928	740	62.82%	419	35.57%	19	1.61%
1932	577	33.26%	1,057	60.92%	101	5.82%
1936	746	35.36%	1,336	63.32%	28	1.33%
1940	986	52.98%	869	46.70%	6	0.32%
1944	670	60.80%	426	38.66%	6	0.54%
1948	637	55.30%	505	43.84%	10	0.87%
1952	775	68.89%	343	30.49%	7	0.62%
1956	715	70.58%	297	29.32%	1	0.10%
1960	642	59.33%	438	40.48%	2	0.18%
1964	493	48.86%	515	51.04%	1	0.10%
1968	601	58.58%	286	27.88%	139	13.55%
1972	1,001	70.29%	386	27.11%	37	2.60%
1976	1,034	55.24%	741	39.58%	97	5.18%
1980	1,623	59.34%	674	24.64%	438	16.01%
1984	2,041	70.33%	782	26.95%	79	2.72%
1988	1,909	56.87%	1,343	40.01%	105	3.13%
1992	1,530	35.78%	1,307	30.57%	1,439	33.65%
1996	2,661	50.77%	1,844	35.18%	736	14.04%
2000	3,677	55.17%	2,393	35.90%	595	8.93%
2004	4,781	57.21%	3,445	41.22%	131	1.57%
2008	4,896	52.18%	4,250	45.29%	237	2.53%
2012	5,236	55.90%	3,862	41.23%	268	2.86%
2016	6,135	58.89%	3,421	32.84%	861	8.27%
2020	6,991	56.88%	4,903	39.89%	397	3.23%
2024	6,828	56.67%	4,841	40.18%	380	3.15%

United States Senate election results for Park County, Colorado2
Year	Republican		Democratic		Third party(ies)	
Year	No.	%	No.	%	No.	%
2020	7,100	57.98%	4,800	39.20%	346	2.83%

United States Senate election results for Park County, Colorado3
Year	Republican		Democratic		Third party(ies)	
Year	No.	%	No.	%	No.	%
2022	5,390	53.67%	4,234	42.16%	419	4.17%

Colorado Gubernatorial election results for Park County
Year	Republican		Democratic		Third party(ies)	
Year	No.	%	No.	%	No.	%
2022	5,271	52.45%	4,463	44.41%	316	3.14%

Park County is consistently Republican. It has not voted for the Democratic nominee for president since Lyndon B. Johnson in 1964.

== Communities ==
=== Towns ===
- Alma
- Fairplay

=== Census-designated place ===
- Guffey
- Hartsel

=== Other unincorporated communities ===
- Bailey
- Como
- Grant
- Jefferson
- Lake George
- Shawnee
- Tarryall

=== Ghost towns ===
- Antero Junction
- Buckskin Joe (Also known as Laurette or Lauret)
- Garo
- Tarryall
- Trump
- Lidderdale

== In popular culture ==
In the long-running animated television series South Park, the eponymous fictional town is situated in an unspecified part of the county.

== Notable people ==
- Gottlieb Fluhmann (Gottlieb Fluhmann disappeared in 1892 and his remains were found in a secluded cave in Park County in 1944. The cause of his death remains unknown).
- Samuel Hartsel
- John J. Hoover
- Sheldon Jackson

== See also ==
- Bibliography of Colorado
- Geography of Colorado
- History of Colorado
  - Arapahoe County, Kansas Territory
  - Park County, Jefferson Territory
  - National Register of Historic Places listings in Park County, Colorado
- Index of Colorado-related articles
- List of Colorado-related lists
  - List of counties in Colorado
  - List of statistical areas in Colorado
- Outline of Colorado
  - Front Range Urban Corridor
