= Samuel Hartsel =

American rancher

- Born: November 22, 1834; Bucks County, Pennsylvania, U.S.
- Died: November 20, 1918 (aged 83); Denver, Colorado, U.S.
- Occupation: Rancher
- Spouse: Nancy Hartsel (m. 1877)
- Children: 4

Samuel Hartsel (November 22, 1834 – November 20, 1918) was an American rancher. The town of Hartsel, Colorado was named after him.

== Life and career ==
Hartsel was born in Bucks County, Pennsylvania. At the age of 15, he became interested in cattle. He moved to South Park, Colorado, where he had worked as a cowman.

Hartsel worked as a blacksmith and had his own trading post serving the Ute people before becoming a rancher; he owned Hartsel Ranch. He also opened a hotel called The Hartsel Hotel.

Hartsel decided to retire from ranching in the 1900s, selling his ranch and moving with his family to Denver, Colorado.

Hartsel died in November 1918 in Denver, Colorado, at the age of 83. He was buried in Fairmount Cemetery.
