= Tarryall, Colorado =

- Town
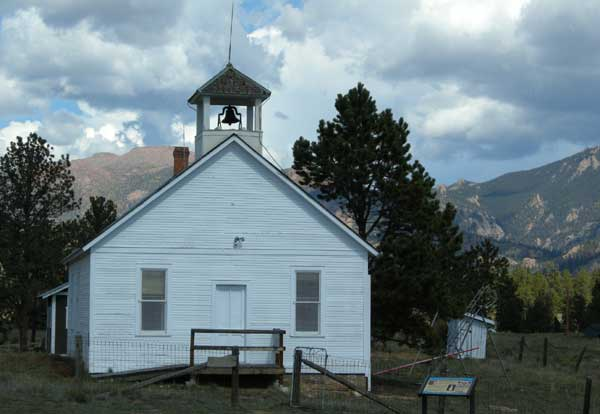
- Tarryall School is listed on the National Register of Historic Places
- Interactive map of Tarryall, Colorado
- Coordinates: 39°07′19″N 105°28′32″W
- Country: United States
- State: Colorado
- Counties: Park
- Founded: 1896
- Elevation: 8,714 ft (2,656 m)
- Time zone: UTC-7 (MST)
  - Summer (DST): UTC-6 (MDT)
- ZIP code: 80827 (Lake George)
- GNIS feature ID: 183832

Tarryall is an unincorporated town eastern Park County, Colorado, United States. The town is located on Tarryall Creek in the eastern edge of the South Park, between Lake George and Jefferson.

== History ==
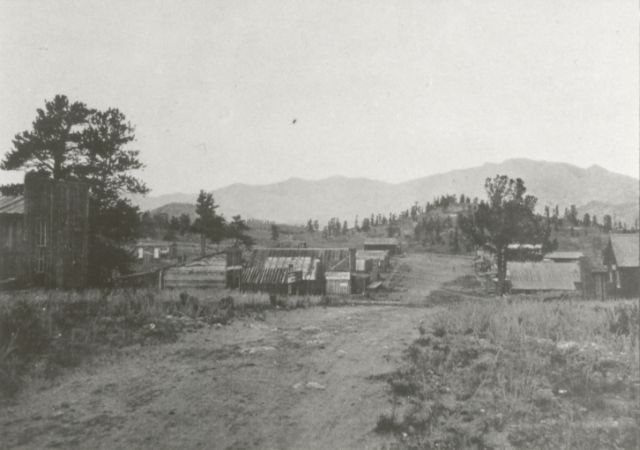
Puma City, 1898

The town was founded in 1896 as Puma City, in response to mineral discoveries in the area. Within its first year, it reached a peak population of about a thousand residents. The Tarryall Post Office soon opened to serve the town. The population dwindled as the mineral discoveries proved to be much smaller than first thought. In the 1900s, the town took the name of its post office, Tarryall. Only a handful of residents remain.
