= Como, Colorado =

Unincorporated community in Colorado, US

- Unincorporated community
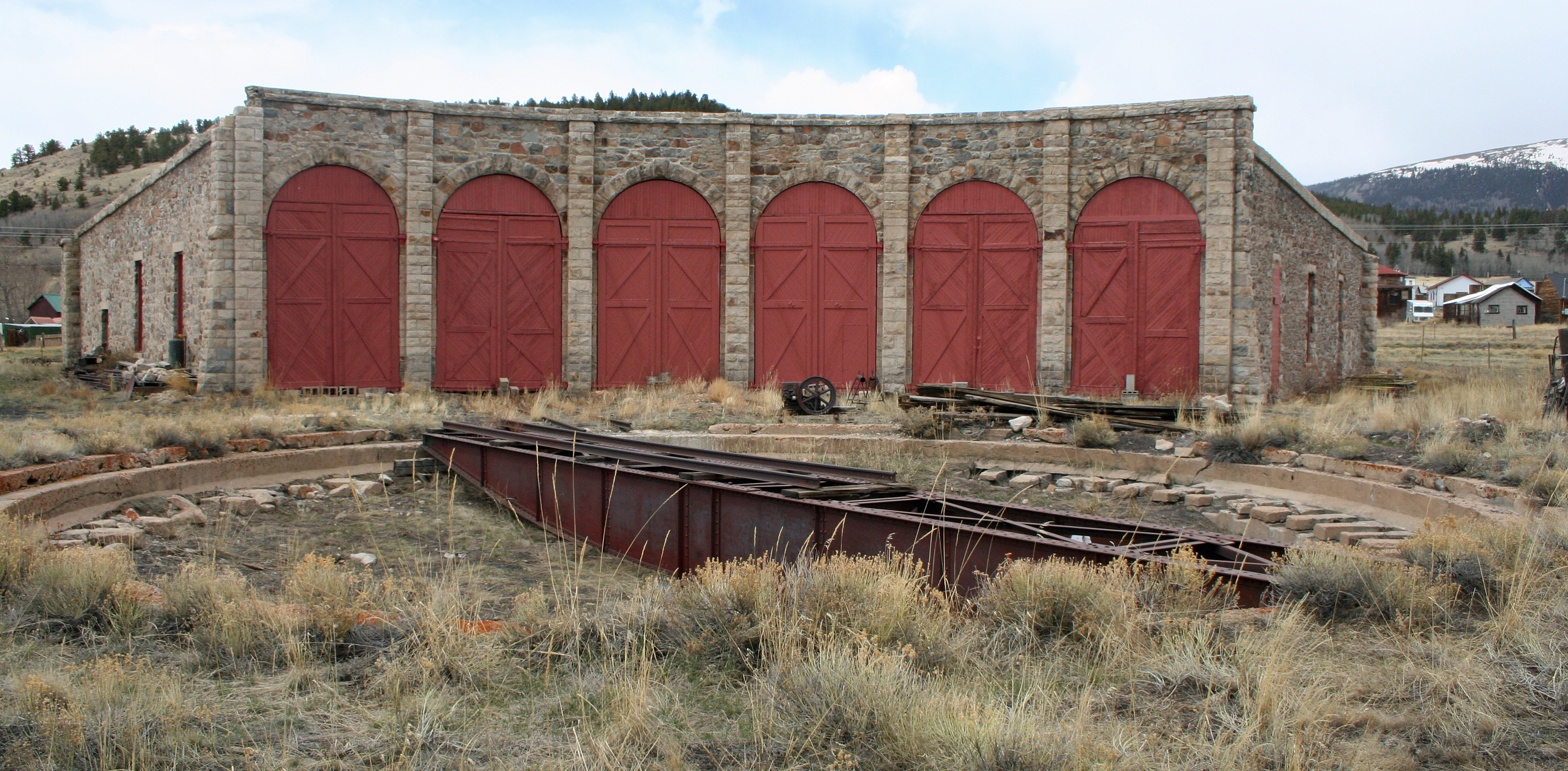
- The Como Roundhouse handled repairs on the railroads until 1937. In 1938, the remaining tracks were removed.

- Location of Como, Colorado. Como (Colorado)
- Coordinates: 39°18′58″N 105°53′34″W
- Country: United States
- State: Colorado
- County: Park

Government
  - Type: Unincorporated community
  - Body: Park County
- Elevation: 9,813 ft (2,991 m)

Population (2010)
  - Total: 439
- Time zone: UTC−07:00 (MST)
  - Summer (DST): UTC−06:00 (MDT)
- ZIP code: 80432
- Area code: 719
- GNIS place ID: 183395

Como is an unincorporated community in Park County in the Rocky Mountains of central Colorado, United States. According to the 2010 census, the population of zip code 80432 is 439, including surrounding subdivisions in a 15-mile radius. Metropolitan Como proper usually has a population of 12 to 15 residents, within the Como plat.

== History ==
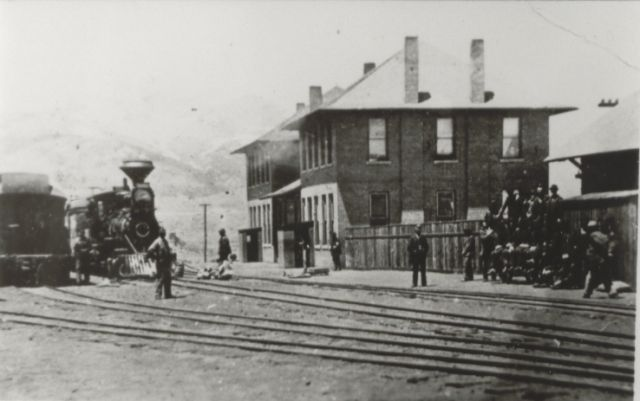
Railway depot in Como, c. 1900

It is believed the town was named by miners from Como, Italy, who worked the coal fields of the area. In 1879, the town became the location of a depot of the Denver, South Park and Pacific Railroad, which was extended over Kenosha Pass to reach the silver mining areas during the Colorado Silver Boom. The Como, Colorado, post office opened on July 23, 1879. Later, the town served as a division point for trains going northward over Boreas Pass and southward toward Garos and over Trout Creek Pass at the western end of South Park.

== Current status ==
The town has many historic weathered structures, including the roundhouse, hotel, and depot. It has the air of a ghost town that is still nevertheless populated. Como has a small commercial district consisting of a post office, gallery and hotel. The roundhouse and depot have been renovated by the Denver, South Park & Pacific Historical Society with plans to make them into an area tourist attraction.

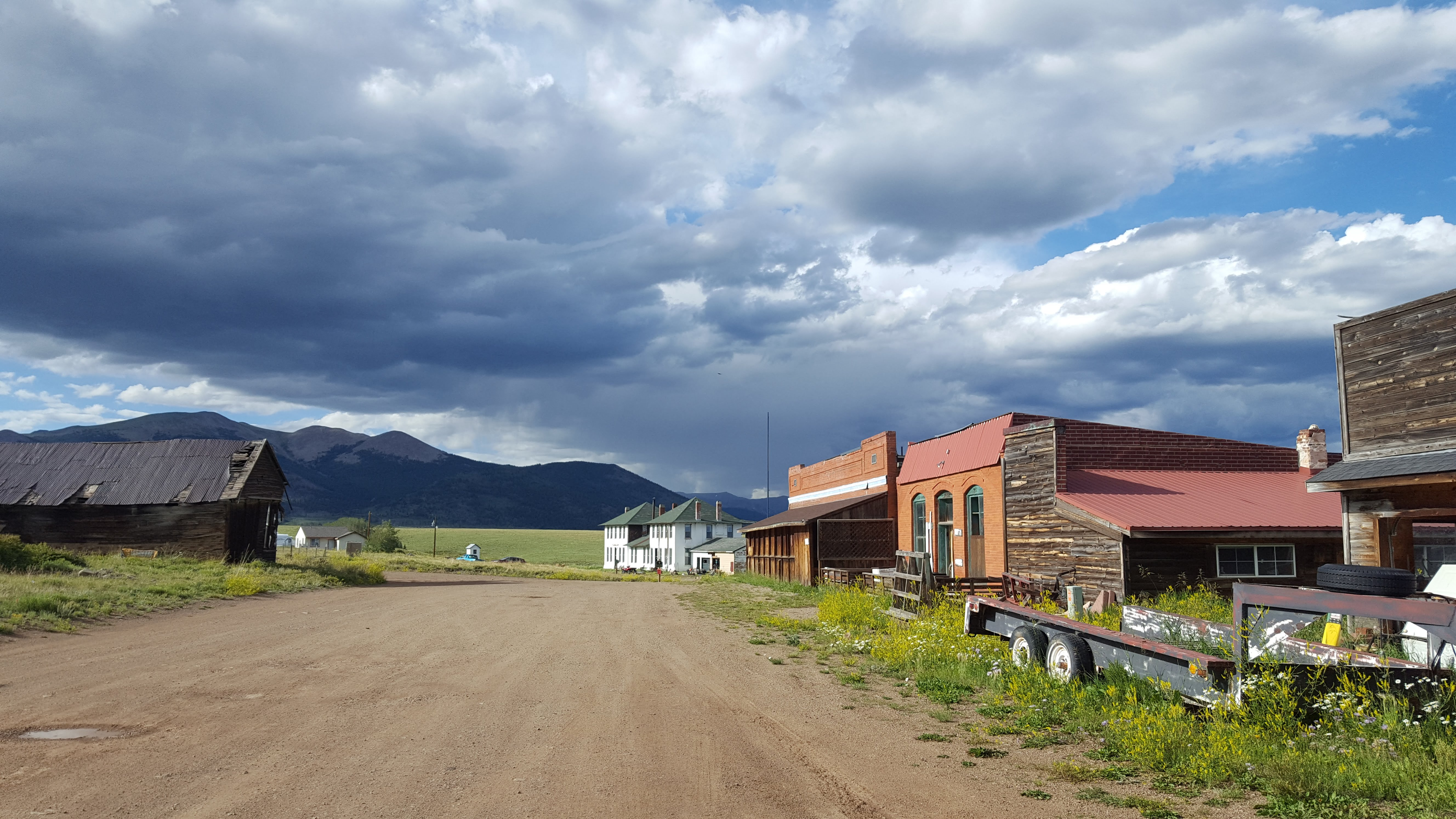
A view of the dilapidated downtown of Como in August 2022

== Geography ==
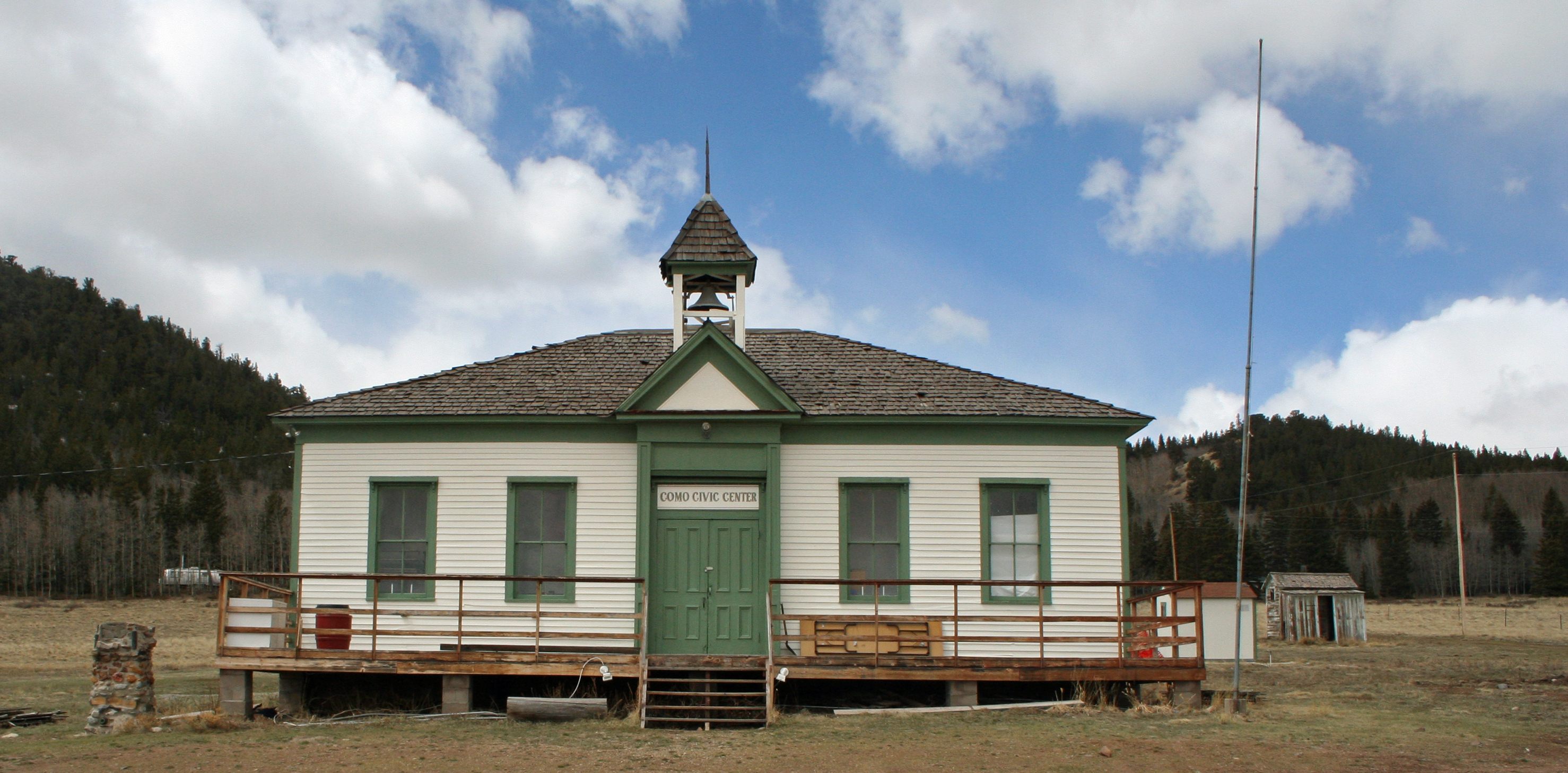
The Como School is listed on the National Register of Historic Places.

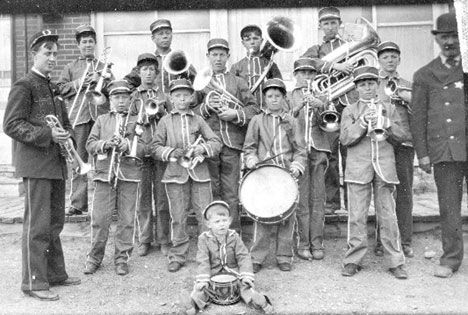
Band in Como, c. 1900

Como is located at the northern end of South Park, Como is an historic railroad settlement. It sits approximately one-half mile (1 km) west of U.S. Route 285 and some nine miles (14 km) northeast of the county seat of Fairplay. Como is accessible by a paved County Road 33, which becomes gravel inside the town. Boreas Pass Road runs northwest over Boreas Pass to Breckenridge. The mountains northwest of Como form a dramatic background to the site of the town on the flank of Little Baldy Mountain.

== See also ==
- Front Range Urban Corridor
