= Lake George, Colorado =

Unincorporated community in Park County, CO, USA

- Unincorporated community
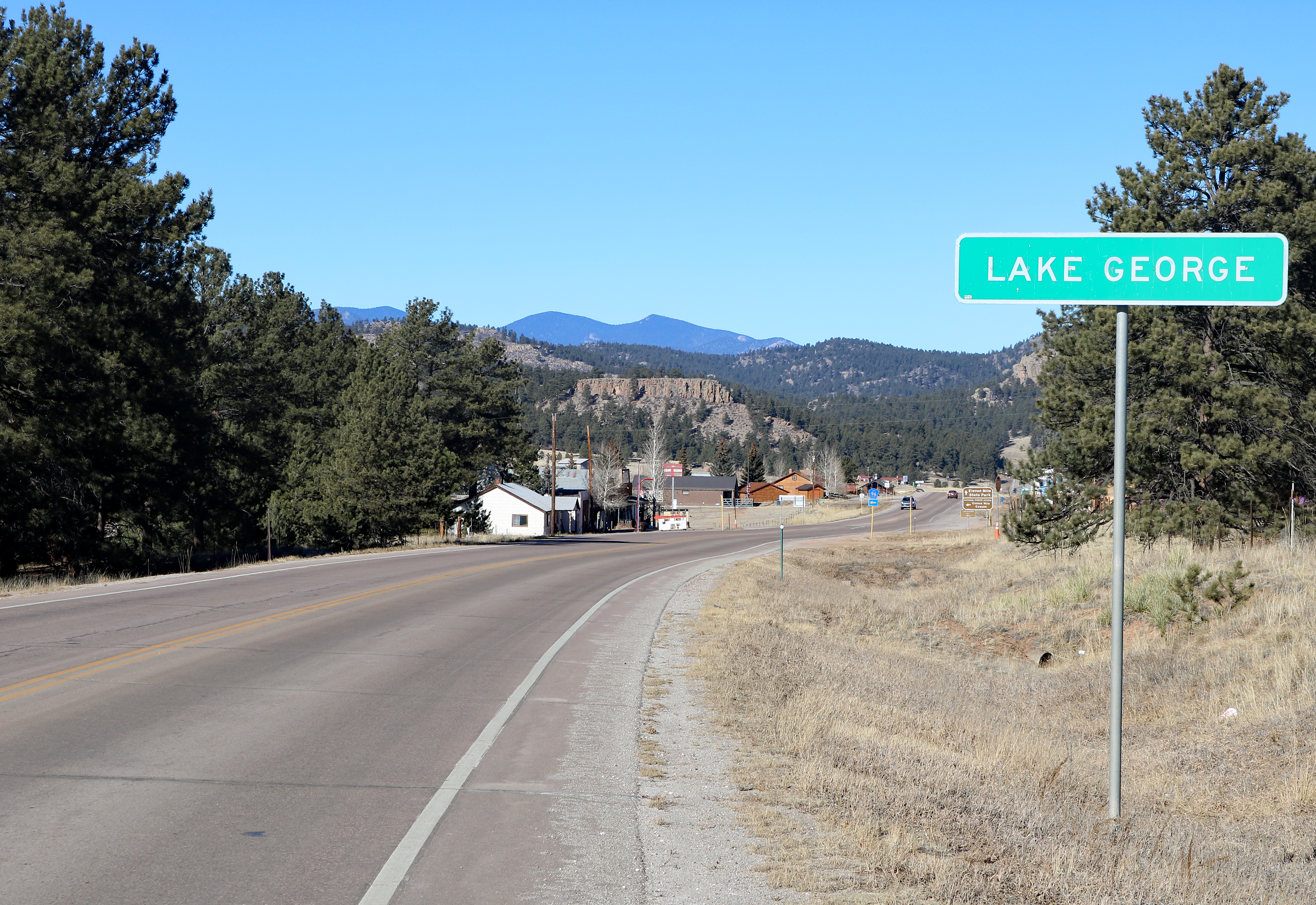
- U.S. Route 24 in Lake George, December 2018
- Interactive map of Lake George, Colorado
- Coordinates: 38°58′47″N 105°21′27″W
- Country: United States
- State: Colorado
- County: Park
- Elevation: 7,993 ft (2,436 m)
- Time zone: UTC-7 (MST)
  - Summer (DST): UTC-6 (MDT)
- ZIP code: 80827
- GNIS feature ID: 191146

Lake George is an unincorporated community and a U.S. Post Office in Park County, Colorado, United States. The Lake George Post Office has the ZIP Code 80827. It lies along U.S. Highway 24 northwest of Colorado Springs, and several miles north of Florissant Fossil Beds National Monument.

== History ==
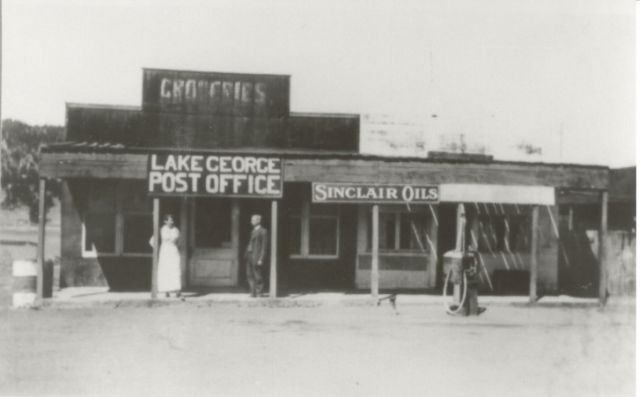
Henry and Adella Rockett stand outside the Lake George Post Office and General Store in Lake George, 1916. The old Post Office is now part of Granite Canyon General Store located in the heart of Lake George.

About 42.3 miles (68.1 km) northwest of Colorado Springs and 7.3 miles (11.7 km) northwest of Florissant, the town of Lake George was established in 1891 as a railroad stop for the Colorado Midland Railway (CM) which had been completed in 1887. The nearby lake, to the town's west and fed by the South Platte River, was built by George Frost for the purpose of supplying ice to the railroad. The lake, originally called George's Lake, was later changed to Lake George when the post office opened. The lake freezes mostly solid in the wintertime, which made it ideal for railroad men to cut large blocks of ice from it in order to keep perishables cool. A privately owned ice company there supplied the needs of much of the Pikes Peak region. Ice cut during the winter was shipped on the CM to both Colorado Springs and the Cripple Creek, Colorado district. Also related to the town's railroading history, a short walk into the surrounding hills reveals Chinese bread ovens, from the period their labor was imported. At the turn of the century the community's population was 30. After 1900 some farmers and ranchers nearby began raising high-altitude potatoes on a limited scale. This furnished the CM with some additional traffic. However, the CM closed in August 1918. Other railways then provided service to certain shippers along the otherwise idle CM railway. Up to that time this had been the shortest rail route through the mountains. Keeping the track open during winter proved expensive, and when the mining of ore dwindled, the tracks were torn up. U.S. Route 24 follows the abandoned grade of the CM railway. By 1941 the population had grown to 100 and the town was the center of an extensive potato growing area. The community's population in 1965 was 100.

In 1995, the Orthodox Church in America female monastic community of Protection of the Holy Virgin moved from Calhan to Lake George, establishing a 10.3 acre monastery. In 1999, the monastery purchased an adjacent lot of 3.5 acres and added it to the monastery's grounds. The community publishes Eastern Orthodox Christian prayer books and hosts public Divine Services.

The just under-140,000-acre (570 km^{2}) Hayman Fire, the largest fire in Colorado's recorded history, started near Lake George on June 8, 2002.

A tornado caused minor damage in the Lake George area on Aug. 18, 2009. Another tornado damaged cabins in 2014.

== Geography ==
Nearby is Camp Alexander, the camp for the Pikes Peak Council of the Boy Scouts, as well as the Elevenmile Reservoir. Also nearby, an original homestead still stands, a remnant from potato farmers. It’s now a dude ranch called the M Lazy C Guest Ranch.

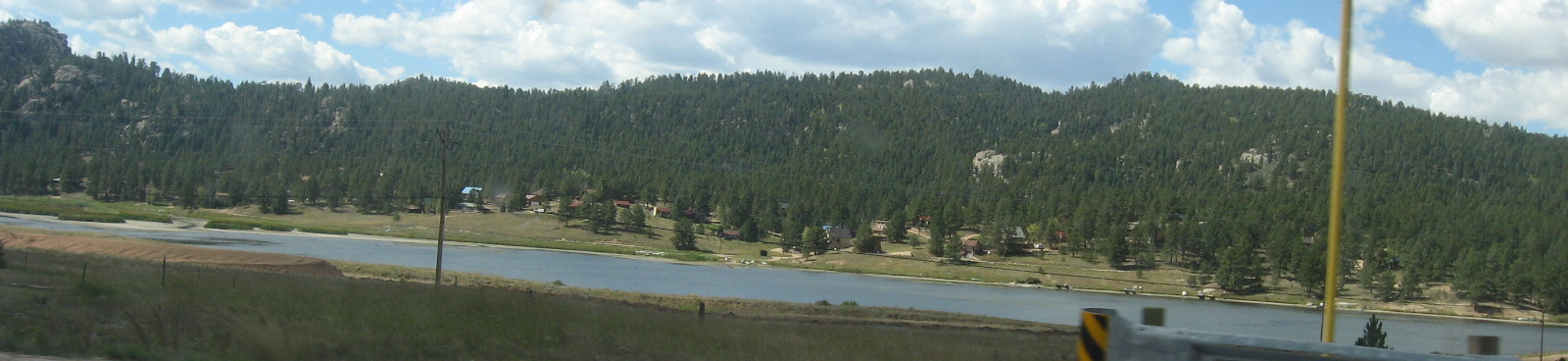
Lake George, the town's eponymous lake, September 2007

=== Climate ===
According to the Köppen Climate Classification system, Lake George has a cold semi-arid climate, abbreviated "BSk" on climate maps.

Climate data for Lake George, Colorado, 1991–2020 normals, extremes 1960–present
Month	Jan	Feb	Mar	Apr	May	Jun	Jul	Aug	Sep	Oct	Nov	Dec	Year
Record high °F (°C)	61 (16)	60 (16)	76 (24)	73 (23)	83 (28)	88 (31)	89 (32)	88 (31)	85 (29)	79 (26)	69 (21)	58 (14)	89 (32)
Mean maximum °F (°C)	48.5 (9.2)	50.8 (10.4)	60.3 (15.7)	65.6 (18.7)	74.4 (23.6)	82.9 (28.3)	84.8 (29.3)	81.8 (27.7)	78.4 (25.8)	71.3 (21.8)	59.6 (15.3)	50.0 (10.0)	85.8 (29.9)
Mean daily maximum °F (°C)	32.7 (0.4)	35.8 (2.1)	44.5 (6.9)	50.7 (10.4)	60.5 (15.8)	72.3 (22.4)	77.1 (25.1)	74.5 (23.6)	68.7 (20.4)	57.4 (14.1)	44.5 (6.9)	33.5 (0.8)	54.4 (12.4)
Daily mean °F (°C)	16.1 (−8.8)	19.2 (−7.1)	28.9 (−1.7)	36.7 (2.6)	46.3 (7.9)	56.4 (13.6)	61.8 (16.6)	59.9 (15.5)	52.8 (11.6)	41.6 (5.3)	29.7 (−1.3)	17.8 (−7.9)	38.9 (3.9)
Mean daily minimum °F (°C)	−0.6 (−18.1)	2.6 (−16.3)	13.2 (−10.4)	22.7 (−5.2)	32.0 (0.0)	40.5 (4.7)	46.4 (8.0)	45.3 (7.4)	36.8 (2.7)	25.8 (−3.4)	14.9 (−9.5)	2.1 (−16.6)	23.5 (−4.7)
Mean minimum °F (°C)	−20.0 (−28.9)	−17.1 (−27.3)	−6.5 (−21.4)	8.1 (−13.3)	20.5 (−6.4)	32.2 (0.1)	40.0 (4.4)	39.4 (4.1)	26.9 (−2.8)	13.6 (−10.2)	−2.9 (−19.4)	−16.9 (−27.2)	−24.7 (−31.5)
Record low °F (°C)	−50 (−46)	−42 (−41)	−30 (−34)	−14 (−26)	10 (−12)	24 (−4)	26 (−3)	30 (−1)	8 (−13)	−6 (−21)	−33 (−36)	−40 (−40)	−50 (−46)
Average precipitation inches (mm)	0.30 (7.6)	0.27 (6.9)	0.57 (14)	0.92 (23)	1.41 (36)	1.20 (30)	2.17 (55)	2.16 (55)	1.09 (28)	0.57 (14)	0.36 (9.1)	0.27 (6.9)	11.29 (285.5)
Average snowfall inches (cm)	6.0 (15)	5.9 (15)	9.9 (25)	9.1 (23)	2.4 (6.1)	0.1 (0.25)	0.0 (0.0)	0.0 (0.0)	0.8 (2.0)	4.1 (10)	5.3 (13)	6.8 (17)	50.4 (126.35)
Average precipitation days (≥ 0.01 in)	3.5	4.0	5.5	6.4	7.1	7.4	11.7	12.2	6.7	4.7	3.7	4.0	76.9
Average snowy days (≥ 0.1 in)	2.8	3.6	4.5	4.0	1.4	0.0	0.0	0.0	0.3	1.7	2.7	3.4	24.4
Source 1: NOAA
Source 2: National Weather Service
