= Denver, South Park and Pacific Railroad =

Historic railroad in Colorado, U.S.

Denver South Park and Pacific Railroad
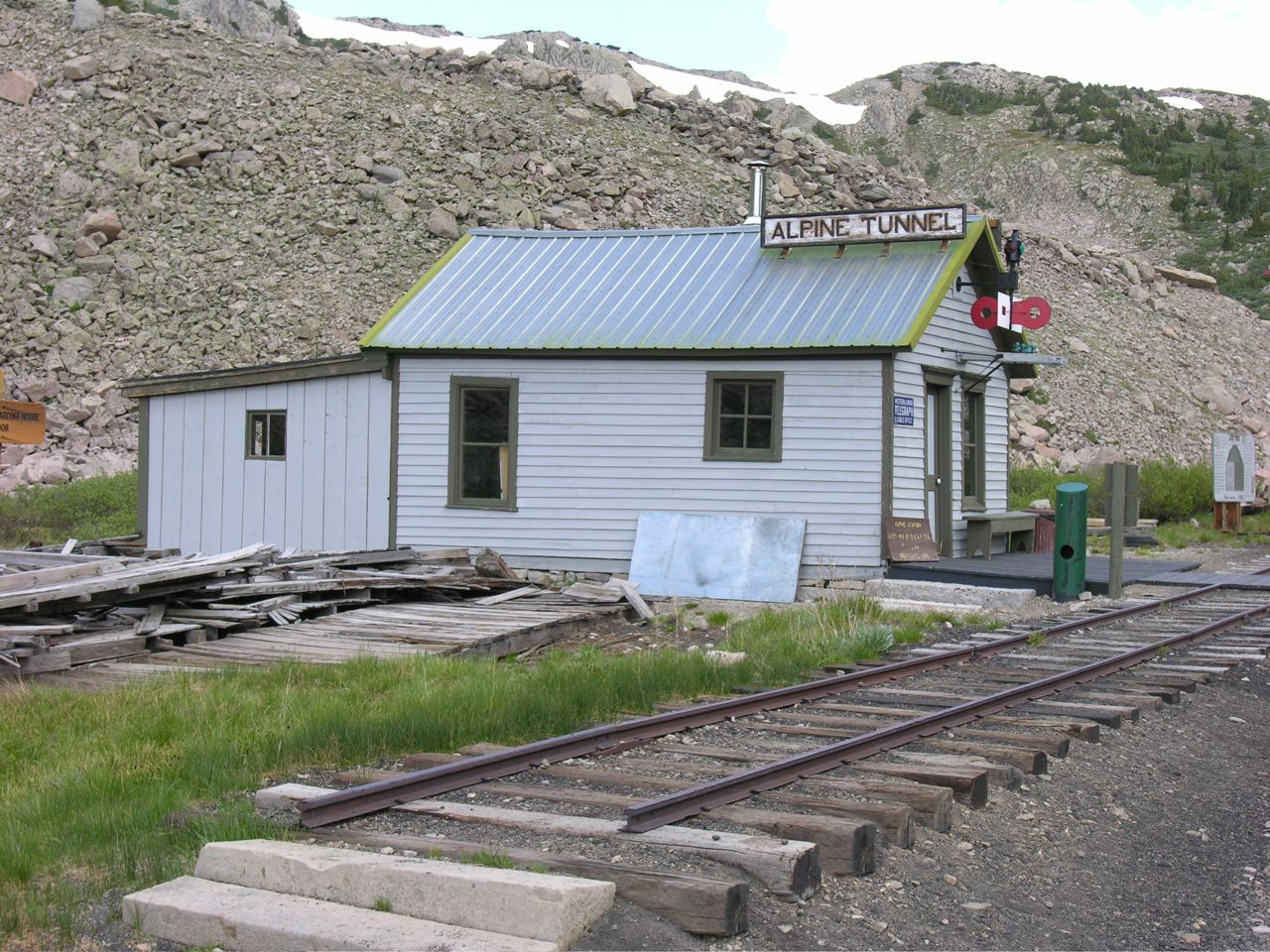
- Alpine tunnel telegraph station

Overview
- Locale: Colorado
- Dates of operation: 1872–1894
- Successor: Colorado and Southern Railway

Technical
- Track gauge: 4 ft 8 1/2 in (1,435 mm) standard gauge
- Previous gauge: originally 3 ft (914 mm)

The Denver, South Park, and Pacific Railroad (later called the Denver, Leadville and Gunnison Railway) was a historic 3 ft (914 mm) narrow gauge railroad that operated in Colorado in the western United States in the late 19th century. The railroad opened up the first rail routes to a large section of the central Colorado mining district in the decades of the mineral boom. The railroad took its name from the fact that its main line from Denver ascended the Platte Canyon and traversed South Park, hence its popular name "The South Park Line." Despite its lofty goals, the line never connected itself with the Pacific or any transcontinental line, apart from its terminal at Denver Union Station.

Founded in 1872 by Colorado Governor John Evans, the company was purchased by the Union Pacific Railway in 1880, though it continued to be operated independently. The line went bankrupt in 1889 and was reorganized under a new corporate name as the Denver, Leadville and Gunnison Railway. When the Union Pacific went bankrupt in 1893, the DL&G lines went into receivership and were eventually sold to the Colorado and Southern Railway. In the first half of the 20th century, nearly all the company's original lines were dismantled or converted into 4 ft 8 1/2 in (1,435 mm) standard gauge. The last train to run on narrow gauge C&S tracks was from Como, Colorado on April 11, 1937. A section of the standard gauge line between Leadville and Climax is still operated as a passenger excursion railroad called the Leadville, Colorado and Southern Railroad. At its peak the Denver, South Park and Pacific Railroad had 335 miles (539 km) of narrow gauge line, making it the largest narrow gauge railroad in the state of Colorado.

== Description of lines ==
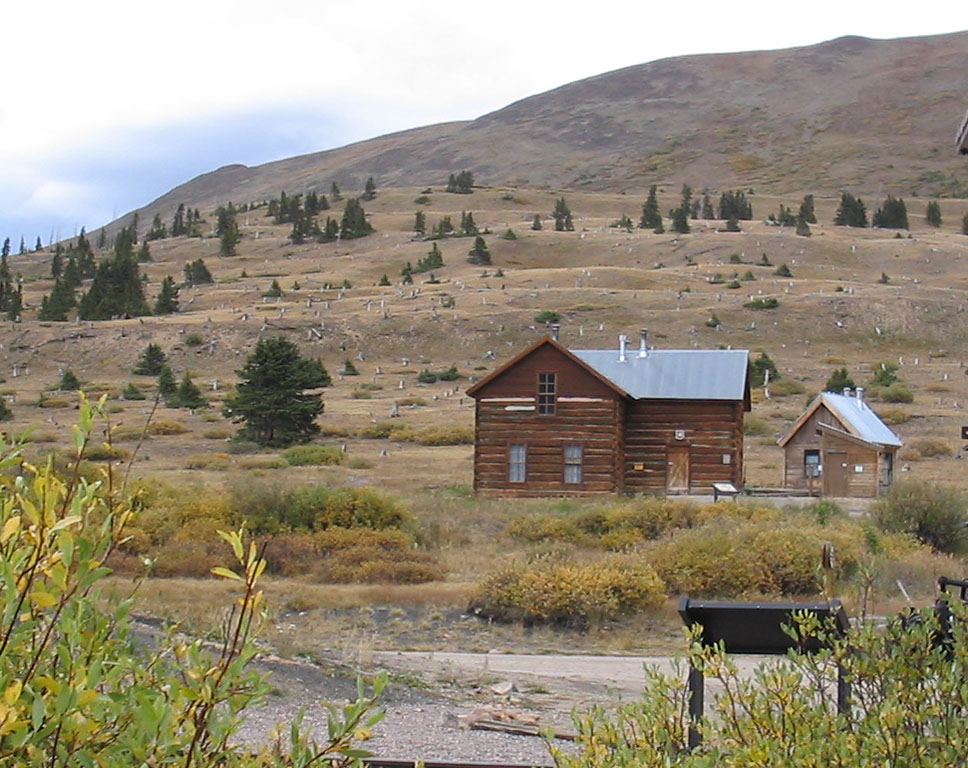
Boreas Pass section house, DSP&P RR.

The company's main line was 3 ft (914 mm) narrow gauge and went from Union Station in Denver up the valley of the South Platte River to the town of South Platte, then followed the North Fork of the South Platte through Buffalo Creek and Bailey. West of Bailey the route along North Fork and through the north end of the Tarryall Mountains essentially followed the route of present-day U.S. Highway 285 to Como, where it branched northward (see below). From Como the main line traversed South Park to Garo, where a spur went northward to Fairplay and Alma. The main line continued south over Trout Creek Pass. On the western side of the pass, a small spur of the main connected to Buena Vista, then traversed the southern end of the Sawatch Range through the Alpine Tunnel to Pitkin and Gunnison. The distance along the main line from Denver to Gunnison was approximately 208 miles (335 km).

A principal branch of the main line north from Como went over Boreas Pass to Breckenridge, Dillon, Keystone, Frisco and Climax. This branch terminated at Leadville.

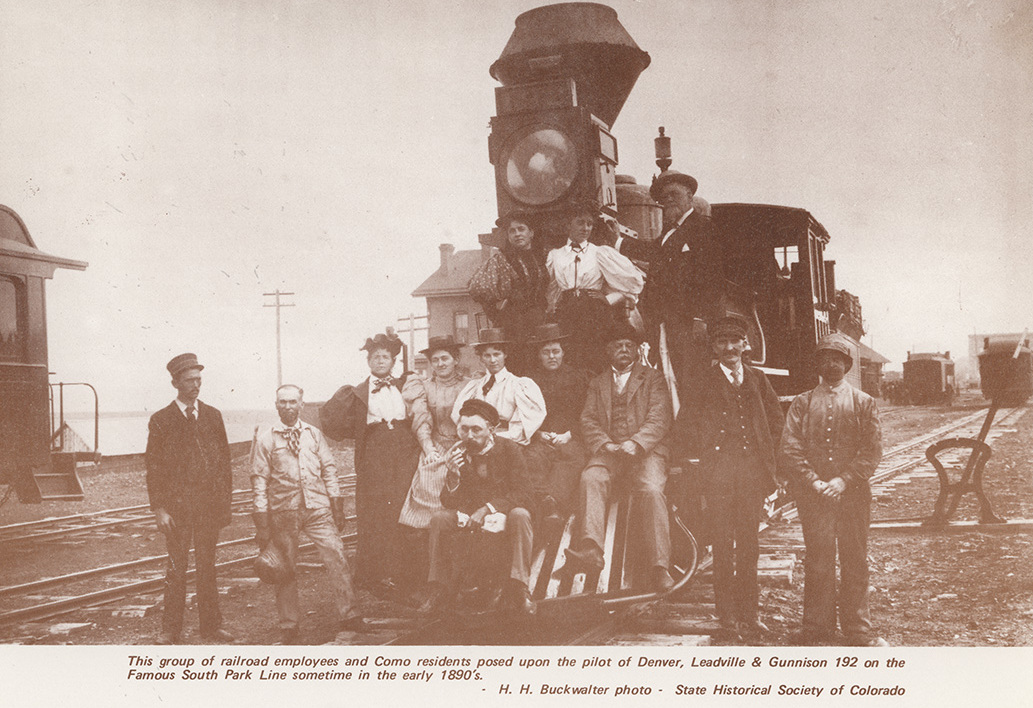
Railroad employees and residents of Como, Colorado on Pilot 192 of Denver, Leadville, and Gunnison in the 1890s.

A small 7-mile (11 km) branch of the main line 9 miles (14 km) south of Denver connected to Morrison (this line was actually constructed first).

== History ==
The company was incorporated in the Colorado Territory as the "Denver, South Park and Pacific Railway" on October 2, 1872, with 2.5 million dollars in capital. Less than a year later, on June 16, 1873, it was reorganized by John Evans as the "Denver, South Park and Pacific Railroad" with an increased capitalization of 3.5 million dollars. Construction from Denver to Morrison began in August, 1873, by the Denver Railway Association, following approval by Arapahoe county voters who passed a $300,000 bond issue. On June 20, 1874, the tracks reached Morrison, and on July 3, scheduled service began between Denver and Morrison, with two 2 round-trip mixed trains per day. This branch would provide a healthy income from the start, shipping stone, lumber, and coal from Mt. Carbon. However, the financial panic in 1873, precipitated by Jay Cooke & Co. of Philadelphia (financiers of the Northern Pacific Railroad), caused a reduction in traffic, resulting in reduced construction until 1876. During this period, the Denver, South Park and Pacific Railroad struggled to remain solvent.

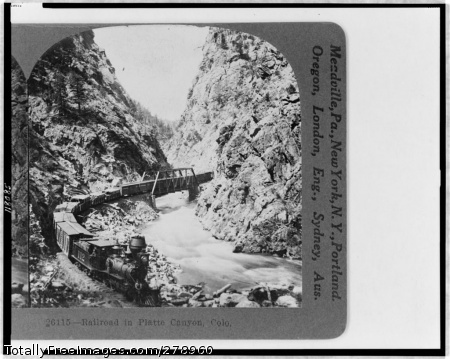
Railroad in Platte Canyon, Colorado ~ 1923

The tracks reached the mouth of the Platte Canyon on May 4, 1878, 20 miles (32 km) from Denver, and by June 2, the tracks reached 12 miles (19 km) up the canyon. The tracks reached Buffalo Creek on June 17. The following year, on May 19, 1879, the tracks reached to the summit of Kenosha Pass and on June 27 they reached Como. The original stone roundhouse at Como has been restored, and is presently in use in the operation of a 3’ narrow gauge locomotive acquired from the Klondike gold fields. An operating turntable has also been installed in the original turntable pit.

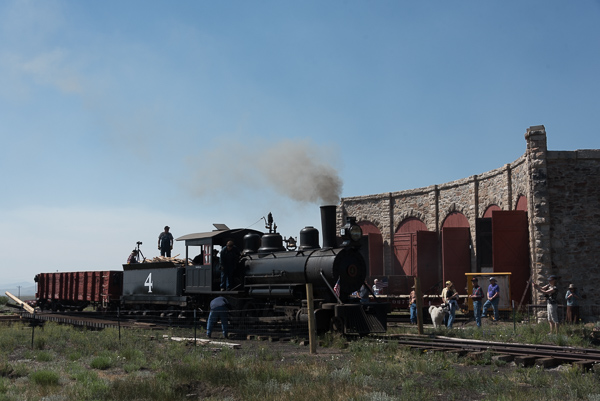
Klondike Kate #4 in front of the Como, CO, roundhouse, July, 2018

The railroad was earning about $1,200 a day, with only a daily operating expense of $480. This made the railroad very profitable, while also allowing a steady flow of money to help with construction cost. In November 1879, with the tracks only as far as South Park, the company contracted for the initial construction of the Alpine Tunnel, with an expected finish date of July 1, 1880. The following month, the tracks reached to the summit of Trout Creek Pass.

=== Leadville mining boom ===
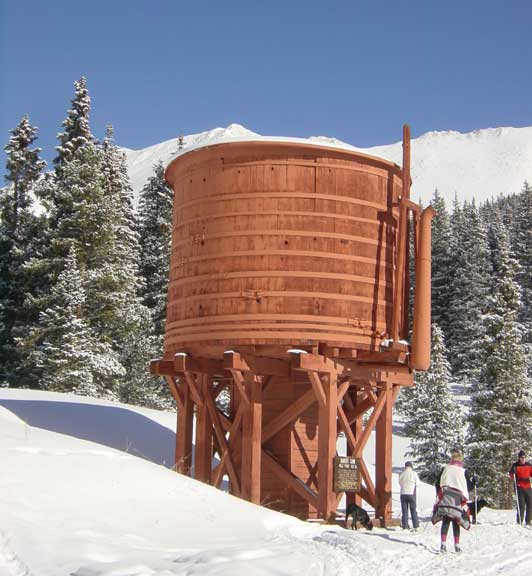
Cross-country skiers traveling along the old railroad grade pass the restored Bakers water tank in Summit County, west of Boreas Pass

A mining boom near Leadville resulted in a construction race between Denver, South Park and Pacific and Denver and Rio Grande Railroad, with both reaching Buena Vista in early 1880. The Denver, South Park and Pacific completed construction first, but rather than both companies laying track to Leadville, Jay Gould pressured the two companies to make a deal called the "Joint Operation Agreement" of October 1, 1879. The companies agree that "...for the purpose of harmony and mutual profit...", the Denver and Rio Grande would lay tracks to the north from Buena Vista to the Leadville mining district, but that the Denver, South Park and Pacific would share equal traffic rights. Similarly, the Denver, South Park and Pacific would build into the Gunnison Country via Chalk Creek, with equal traffic rights given to the Denver and Rio Grande. In 1884 the D&RG ended the Joint Agreement, which forced the DSP&P to build their own line to Leadville. This route, the "High Line" left the original route at Como, and proceeded across Boreas Pass to Breckenridge, then across Fremont Pass to Leadville. This route was noteworthy for crossing the Continental Divide twice (from the Atlantic side to the Pacific side at Boreas Pass, and back to the Atlantic side at Fremont Pass), and was extremely difficult to operate in winter.

=== The Alpine Tunnel ===
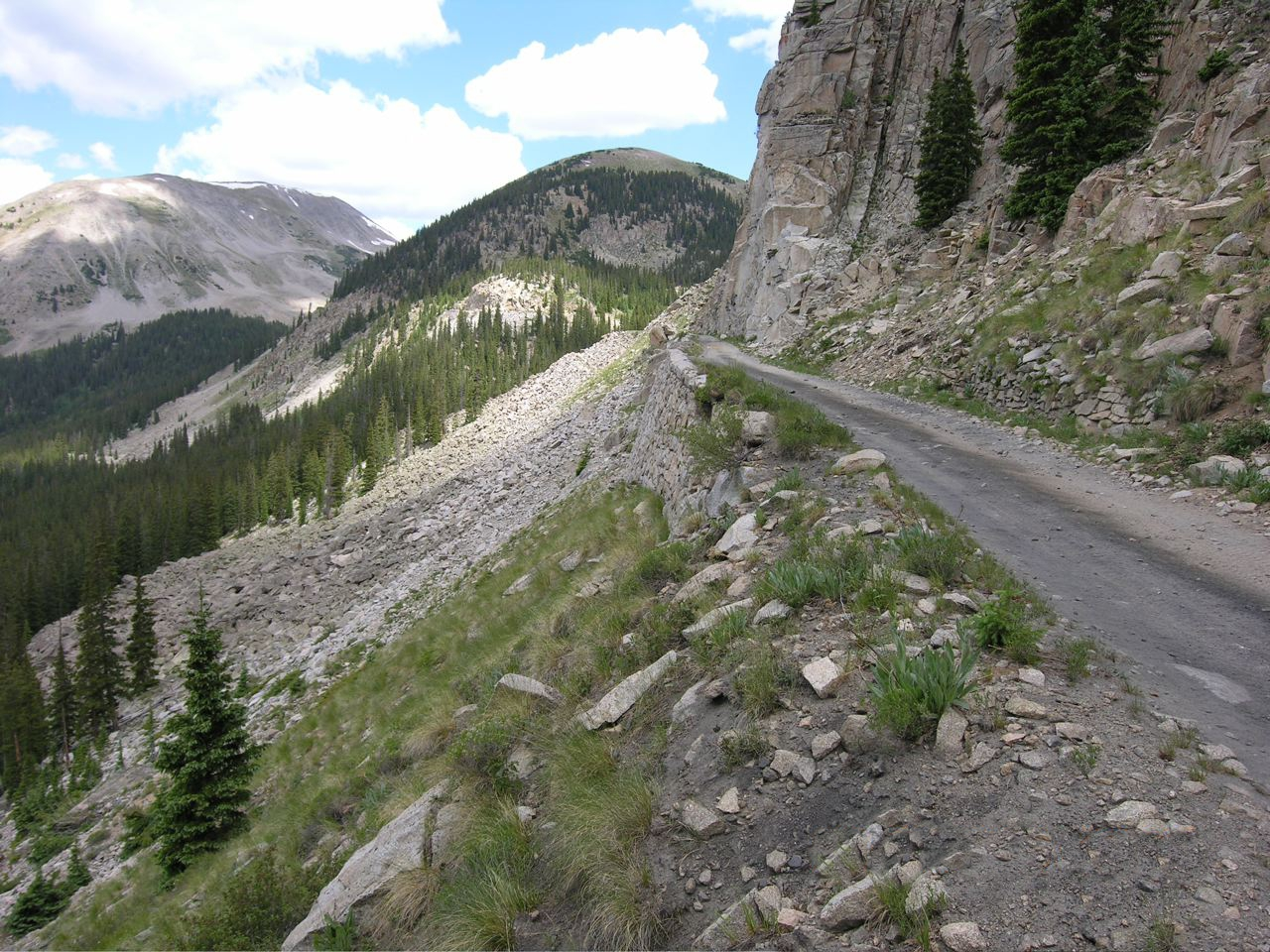
Approach to the Alpine tunnel

Meanwhile, construction continued from Buena Vista past Mount Princeton to what would become the Alpine Tunnel. The Alpine Tunnel was "holed through" on July 26, 1881. Location of the tunnel portals and establishing a center line of the bore were completed in December 1879. Construction of the Alpine Tunnel took place between 1880 and 1881, by Cummings & Co. Construction company. This was the highest and most expensive tunnel built up until that time. It exceeds two miles (3.2 km) above sea level, with its highest point at 11,523.7 feet (3,512.4 m). It is 500 feet (152 m) under Altman Pass, later to be named Alpine Pass to prevent confusion, with a 1,825-foot (556 m) bore. It took 18 months to complete, with most of the construction done during the winter months. The tunnel only had a thirty-year life span, with the last locomotive passing through the tunnel on November 10, 1910.

The line exited the west portal of the Alpine Tunnel, to Alpine Tunnel Station, the highest railroad station in the United States. There also was a turntable, water tank, and a two-story frame boarding house that replaced the stone boarding house and engine house, which burned down in 1906. Parlin, located at milepost 189.78 is where the tracks of the Denver, South Park and Pacific and the Denver and Rio Grande joined up and ran along each other to Gunnison. The land for the track was given to the railroad by local dairy rancher John Parlin around 1877, with the condition that the railroad would build a depot, and stop for at least five minutes so passengers could buy milk. The main line reached Gunnison the following year in 1882.

=== The Snowplow Trials ===
In March 1889, the Denver, South Park and Pacific purchased a Leslie-type rotary snowplow to help combat the heavy snowfall across the railroad. However, further problems would arise from the usage of the plow. This included issues with rocks, fallen trees, and other debris in the snow that would be carried with the snow, especially in events such as blizzards and avalanches. If the crews didn't watch out, the rotary snowplow would run into the debris, damaging the plowing wheel. Orange Jull, who had sold the design rights to the Leslie Brothers, invented another type of snowplow, the Jull Centrifugal Snow Excavator. It was predicted to solve the debris problem in snowplowing and had succeeded in testing on several railroads in the Eastern United States. The Union Pacific arranged a competition between the now-Denver, Leadville, and Gunnison's rotary and a Jull-type plow purchased for testing. From the 16th to the 18th of April, 1890, the two plows were tested in a series of trials, running from Hancock to the east portal of the Alpine Tunnel, but Jull's machine kept having issues, such as derailment or not properly clearing the snow. At last, the total failure of the snow excavator was acknowledged by its crew and Orange Jull, and the Leslie machine had come out victorious. Attendants included high-ranking officials from railroads across the United States and other figures such as photographer William Henry Jackson and author Cy Warman.

=== After reaching Gunnison ===
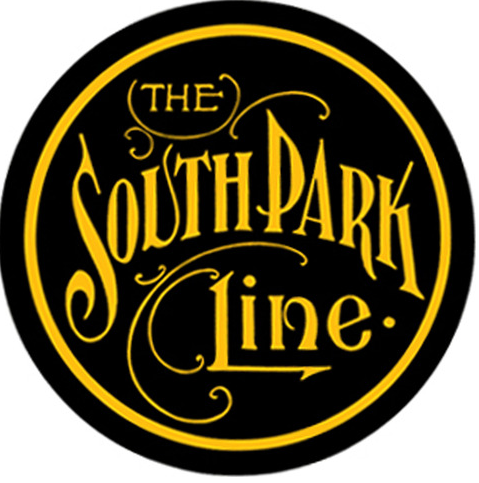
The DSP&P "South Park Line" advertising logo (recreation)

The Denver, South Park, & Pacific built north of Gunnison up the Ohio Creek Drainage to the Castelton and Baldwin Areas. Then planning to cross over Kebler Pass to Delta, Grand Junction, and points west and south. Track was laid four miles (6.4 km) past the Baldwin Mine, and another eight miles (13 km) were graded, but after losing rights of way to Lake City and the San Juan Mining District, no more construction would be done west.

The railroad went into receivership in May 1888. On July 17, 1889, the company was sold at foreclosure proceedings to the Denver, Leadville and Gunnison Railway, a new railroad which was formed to operate the DSP&P lines. The successor company went into receivership on August 4, 1894. The Colorado and Southern Railway, chartered in 1898, took over the former DSP&P lines in January 1899. The Colorado and Southern started dismantling in 1910 with the closure of the Alpine Tunnel. In 1930, the C&S attempted to shut down the main line through the Platte Canyon, in cooperation with the Denver Board of Water Commissioners, who desired to build a dam in the canyon (See Waterton Canyon, CO). Nevertheless, the construction of modern roads in the Rockies led to a decrease in revenue and traffic. The last freight and passenger trains between Denver and Leadville operated in April 1937, and on April 10, 1937, the South Park Line officially closed down. The last regular freight train operated between Denver and Como on April 25. The last 3 ft (914 mm) narrow gauge section, between Leadville and Climax, was converted to standard gauge on August 25, 1943.

== Locomotives ==
=== National Locomotive Works ===
The Denver, South Park & Pacific owned one 4-4-0 and four 2-6-0 type locomotives built by the National Locomotive Works before 1880. These locomotives were most often used to haul daily passenger trains from Denver to the South Park region of Colorado on account of their low tractive effort. Unfortunately, these small locomotives are not well documented, so little is known about them.

=== Mason Machine Works ===
The Denver, South Park & Pacific owned nineteen 2-6-6T and four 2-8-6T type locomotives built by the Mason Machine Works. These locomotives had drivers that pivoted around curves and were the first non-European locomotives to be fitted with Walschaerts valve gear. The 2-6-6T Mason Bogies are the most well-known out of any of the DSP&P locomotives because of their distinct appearance. Only one Mason Bogie (DSP&P #24, named Buena Vista/ D&LG #57) survived into the Colorado & Southern era. The 2-8-6T Mason Bogies were the only locomotives of this type ever built by Mason, making them a unique addition to the DSP&P's roster.

=== Baldwin Locomotive Works ===
The Denver, South Park & Pacific owned eight 2-8-0 type locomotives built by the Baldwin Locomotive Works, all of which were built in 1880. One of these locomotives (DSP&P #51/DL&G #191) is preserved and nicely restored, though not operational, at the Colorado Railroad Museum.

=== Brooks Locomotive Works ===
The Denver, South Park & Pacific owned ten 2-6-0 type locomotives built by the Brooks Locomotive Works. These were rebuilt sometime during the Colorado & Southern era to feature straight boilers rather than their original wagon top boilers. By the time the last locomotive of this type was finally scrapped in 1927, they had become only Brooks locomotives in name.

=== Cooke Locomotive & Machine Works ===
The Denver, South Park & Pacific owned twenty 2-8-0 and eight 2-6-0 type locomotives built by the Cooke Locomotive & Machine Works. The 2-8-0 locomotives were all sold off or scrapped by the Colorado & Southern by 1922. These were near-identical to the earlier Baldwin 2-8-0s with the only difference being the size of the drivers, which are one inch larger. The 2-6-0 type locomotives were fitted with wagon top boilers during the C&S's modernization process and #72 still survives today in Breckenridge, Colorado as Colorado & Southern #9.

=== Paint ===
The DSP&P's original locomotives were painted in bright colors that reflect the stylistic choices of railroad executives and locomotive builders at the time. The most popular colors to see on the DSP&P in its early years were wine red, chocolate brown, and green. Locomotives were painted black in 1885 during the Union Pacific's vast re-lettering program. Another distinct feature of locomotives of this time period were bright and decorative Russia Iron boiler jackets, though these were eventually either replaced or completely painted over.

=== Spark Arrestors ===
Common spark arrestors to see on the early years of the South Park Line were the "Nesmith" and "Congdon" designs. These were large, round, and diamond shaped. The DSP&P's locomotives carried these until they were eventually replaced with regular diamond stacks, and later the "McConnell" (also known as the "Pancake") design. In the years that the Colorado & Southern controlled the South Park's railway network, straight stacks replaced the McConnell design, and later, a common spark arrestor that could be seen after 1917 was the "Ridgway" design.

For the complete roster of DSP&P/DL&G locomotives visit: https://utahrails.net/up/denver-south-park-locos.php

See External Links for images and sites detailing different South Park locomotives.

=== Remaining Locomotives ===
There are two locomotives that still exist from the original Denver, South Park and Pacific Railroad, as well as one locomotive from when the railroad existed as the Denver, Leadville and Gunnison:

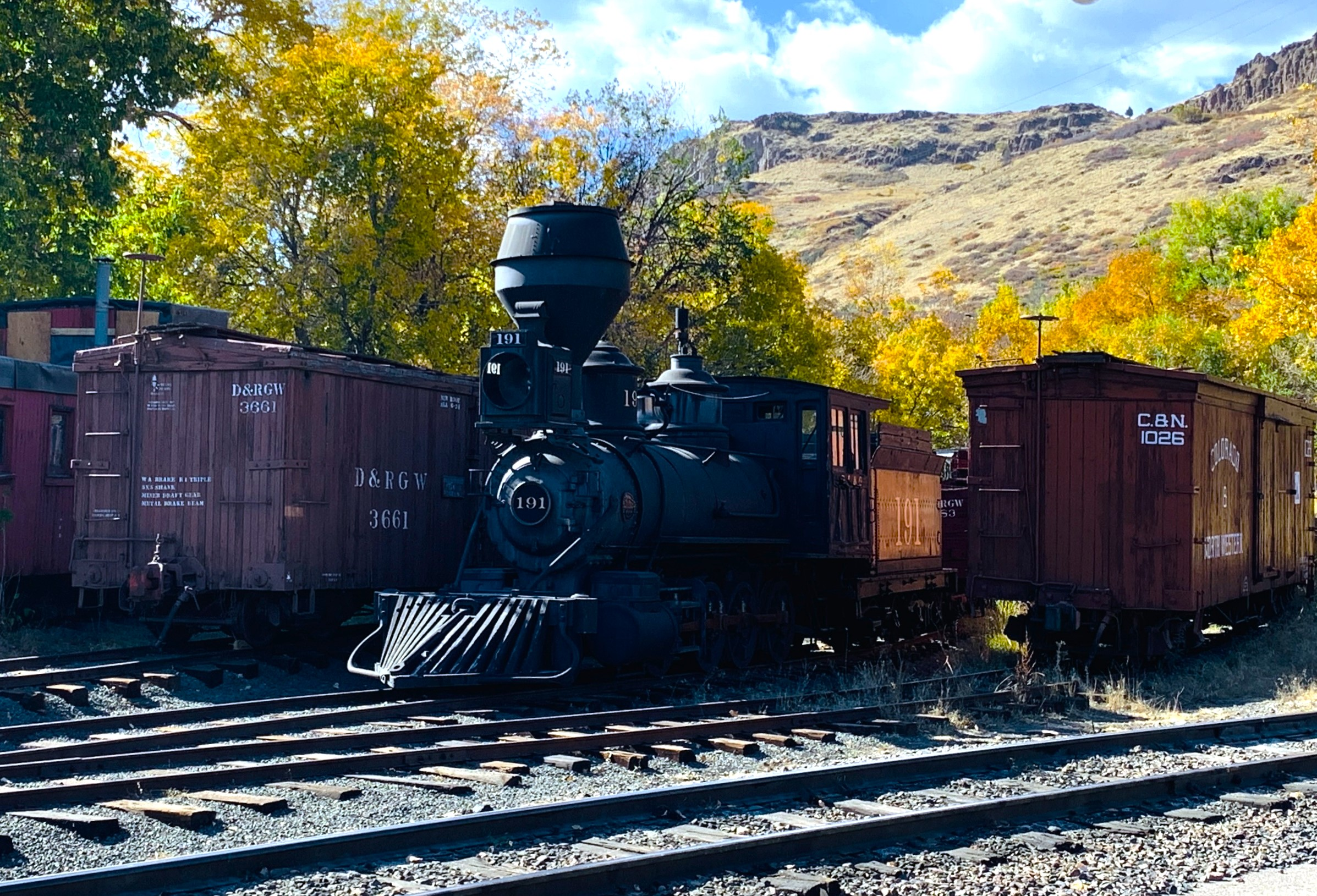
Denver, Leadville & Gunnison #191 in its stand at the Colorado Railroad Museum in Golden, Colorado.

No. 51, a 2-8-0 built in 1880 by Baldwin Locomotive Works. #51 was renumbered in 1885 to #191 and still bears this number, currently residing at the Colorado Railroad Museum in Golden, Colorado on static display, and is the oldest remaining authentic Colorado locomotive in the state.

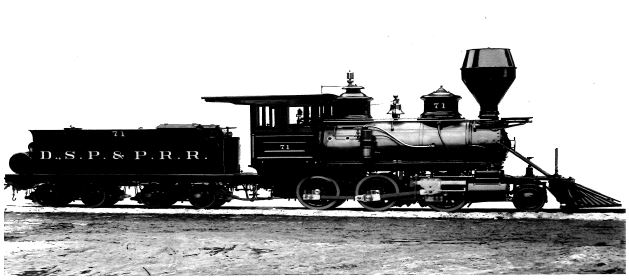
This photo of Denver, South Park & Pacific No. 71 in 1884 shows what DSP&P 72 originally looked like.

No. 72, a 2-6-0 built in 1884 by Cooke Locomotive Works. #72 was renumbered by the Colorado and Southern Railroad as their #9, and has had a substantial working history: It served as the loco for the "Deadwood Central" excursion trainset which had been assembled for the Chicago Railroad Fair of 1948–49, then went to the Black Hills Central Railroad in 1956, and then to the Georgetown Loop in 1988. As of 2020, #9 is on static display at the Rotary Snowplow Park in Breckenridge, Colorado, having suffered mechanical damage while in service at the Georgetown Loop in 2006.

No. 263, a 2-8-0 built in 1886 by Rhode Island Locomotive Works. #263 was originally built for the Utah & Northern Railway and was transferred to the DL&G after the U&N switched to standard gauge in July of 1887. It would serve on the railroad for a few years as a transfer locomotive, including during the snowplow trials of April 1890, before being sold to the DL&G in September 1890. #263 was renumbered by the Colorado and Southern Railroad as their #60 and would go on to serve the C&S until 1941, when it was donated to Idaho Springs where it now is on static display in its C&S markings.

Note: The locomotive at South Park City is not an authentic DSP&PRR locomotive. It is a 3 ft (914 mm) narrow gauge locomotive built by H.K. Porter, Inc. in 1914 for a railroad in Guatemala. The Como roundhouse locomotive (Klondike Kate #4) is a 1912 2-6-2 by Baldwin Locomotive Works manufactured for the Klondike Mines Railway, operating to Dawson, Yukon Territory, then after 1942 on the Alaskan White Pass & Yukon, before operating on tourist lines in the Lower 48 states of the USA. It also is not a historic DSP&PRR locomotive, having waited until 2017 to run on South Park track, in the Como, Colorado and Boreas Pass area.
