= Hartsel, Colorado =

Census-designated place in Park County, CO, USA

- Census-designated place
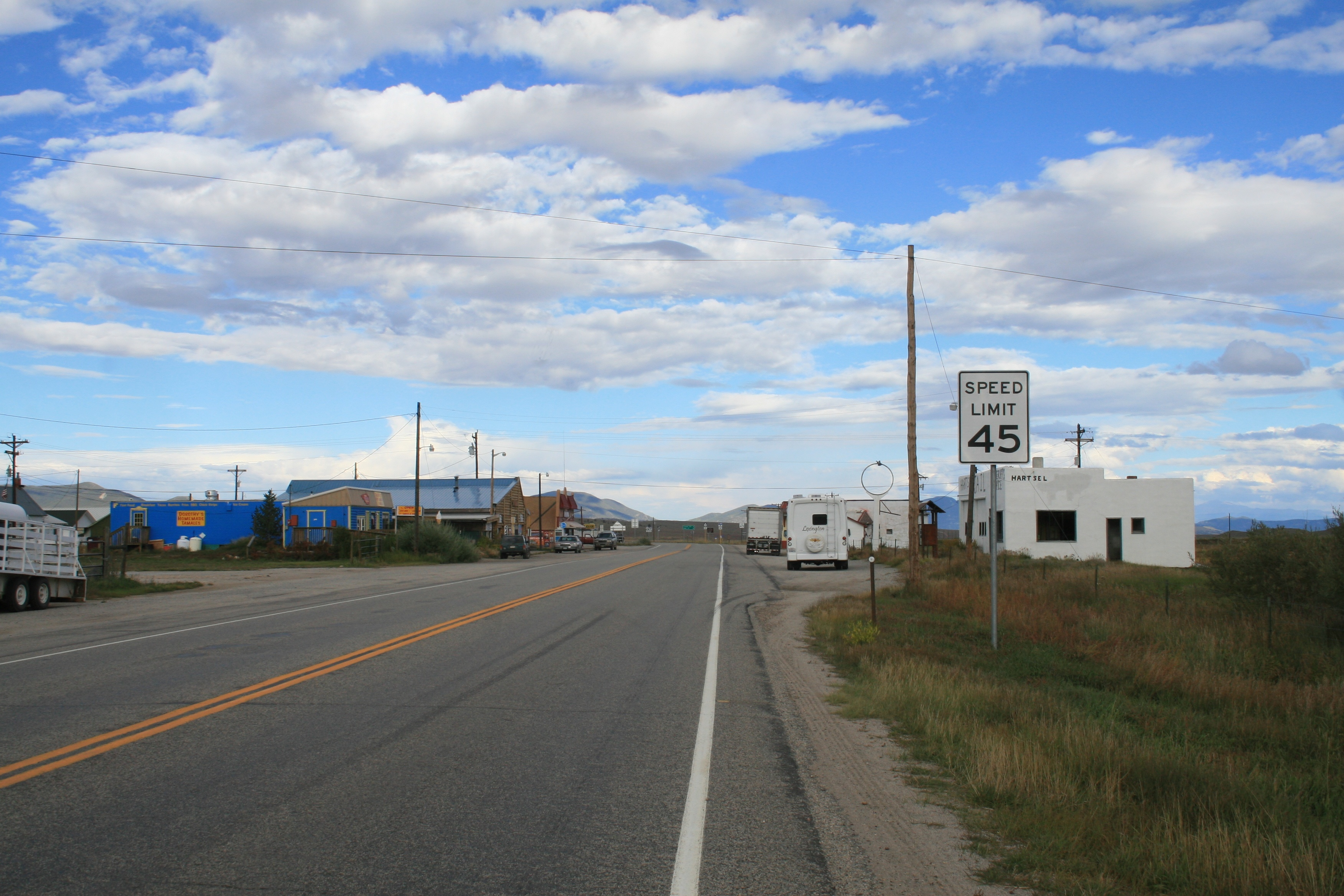
- U.S. Route 24/State Highway 9 in Hartsel, September 2006

- Location of the Hartsel CDP in the State of Colorado
- Coordinates: 39°01′19″N 105°47′52″W
- Country: United States
- State: Colorado
- County: Park County
- Founded: 1880

Government
  - Type: Unincorporated area

Area
  - Total: 0.192 sq mi (0.498 km^{2})
  - Land: 0.188 sq mi (0.486 km^{2})
  - Water: 0.0046 sq mi (0.012 km^{2})
- Elevation: 8,904 ft (2,714 m)

Population (2020)
  - Total: 38
- Time zone: UTC-7 (MST)
  - Summer (DST): UTC-6 (MDT)
- ZIP Code: 80449
- Area code: 719
- GNIS feature ID: 2805924

Hartsel is a census-designated place (CDP) in and governed by Park County, Colorado United States. The population was 38 at the 2020 census. The Hartsel post office has the ZIP Code 80449. The CDP is a part of the Denver–Aurora–Lakewood, CO Metropolitan Statistical Area.

== History ==
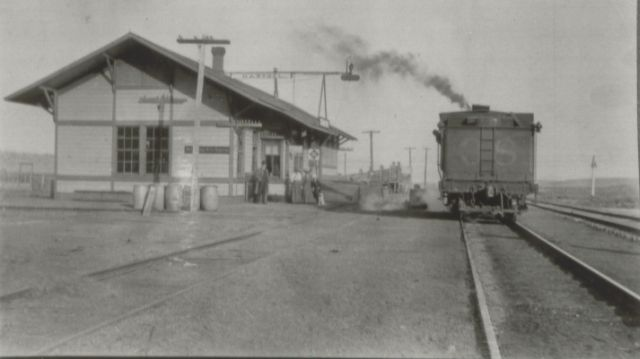
Railroad Depot in Hartsel, 1916

Founded in 1880, Hartsel is close to the geographic center of the state, and is often referred to as "The Heart of Colorado". The namesake of the community is Samuel Hartsel, a local farmer and cattle rancher who came to Park County in 1860 and left in 1908. He developed the Hartsel hot springs and built a sawmill, blacksmith shop, and a trading post to lay the groundwork for the town.

== Geography ==
The Hartsel CDP has an area of 123 acres (0.498 km^{2}), including 3.0 acres (0.012 km^{2}) of water.

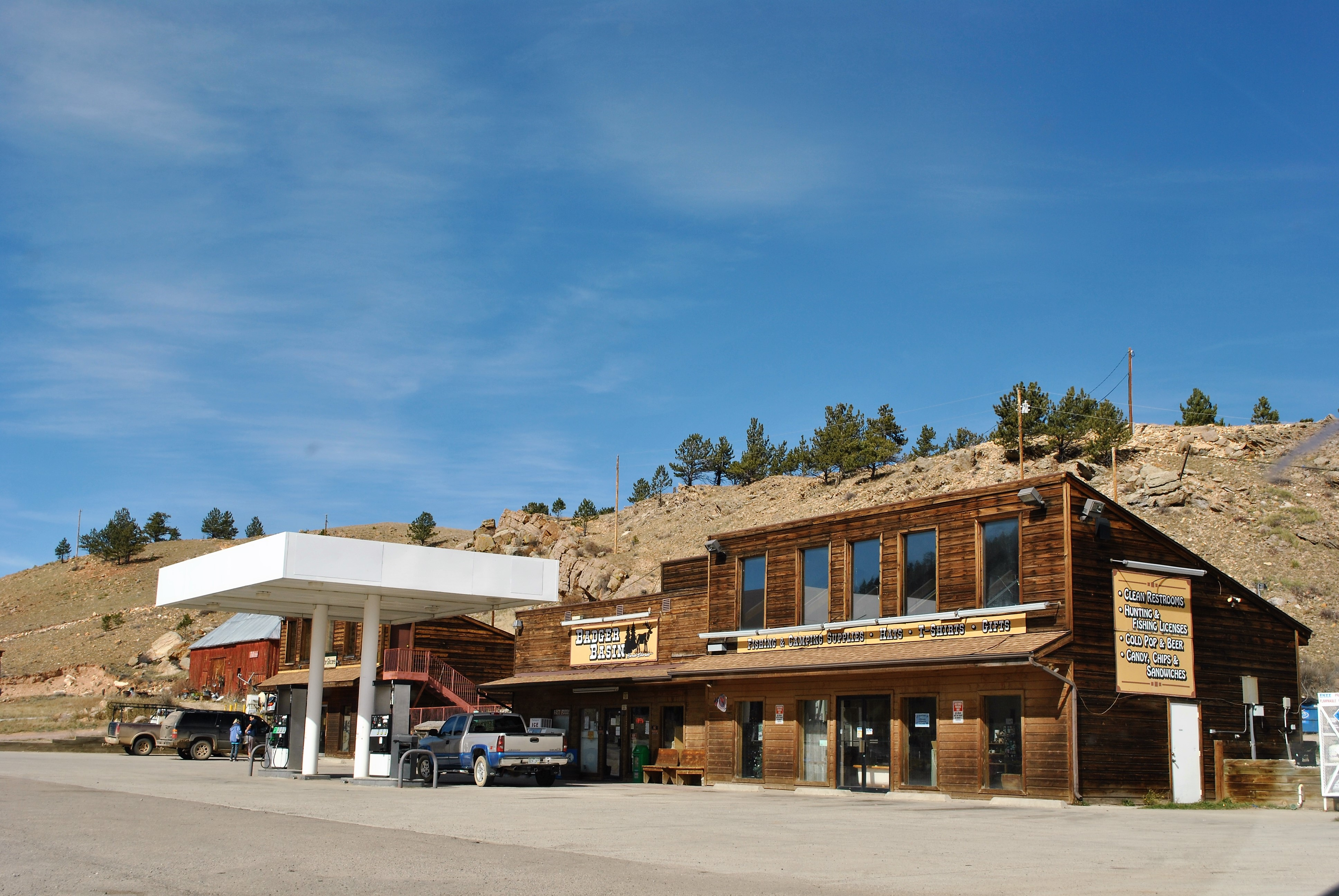
Hartsel. October 2017

=== Climate ===
According to the Köppen climate classification system, Hartsel has a Cold Semi-arid climate (BSk). According to the United States Department of Agriculture, the Plant Hardiness zone is 3b with an average annual extreme minimum temperature of −30.7 °F (−34.8 °C).

Summers are warm with chilly nights in the 30s and 40s (°F) and some thunderstorm activity during the months of July and August. Winters are cold and dry with lows below zero. A climate writeup consisting of interpolated data is below.

Climate data for Hartsel, Park County, CO. Elevation 8901 ft.
Month	Jan	Feb	Mar	Apr	May	Jun	Jul	Aug	Sep	Oct	Nov	Dec	Year
Mean daily maximum °F (°C)	35.1 (1.7)	37.1 (2.8)	42.6 (5.9)	49.9 (9.9)	60.1 (15.6)	70.6 (21.4)	76.3 (24.6)	73.5 (23.1)	67.2 (19.6)	56.0 (13.3)	43.5 (6.4)	35.1 (1.7)	54.0 (12.2)
Mean daily minimum °F (°C)	2.2 (−16.6)	4.5 (−15.3)	13.6 (−10.2)	20.2 (−6.6)	28.7 (−1.8)	35.8 (2.1)	41.2 (5.1)	40.3 (4.6)	32.0 (0.0)	21.7 (−5.7)	12.5 (−10.8)	2.9 (−16.2)	21.4 (−5.9)
Average precipitation inches (mm)	0.35 (8.9)	0.25 (6.4)	0.84 (21)	0.81 (21)	1.09 (28)	1.19 (30)	2.05 (52)	2.56 (65)	1.05 (27)	0.90 (23)	0.37 (9.4)	0.40 (10)	11.86 (301)
Average relative humidity (%)	56.0	52.2	51.0	46.4	44.3	40.5	45.5	52.5	47.0	44.0	48.4	53.1	48.4
Average dew point °F (°C)	5.5 (−14.7)	6.0 (−14.4)	12.2 (−11.0)	16.5 (−8.6)	24.0 (−4.4)	29.8 (−1.2)	37.8 (3.2)	39.7 (4.3)	30.2 (−1.0)	18.8 (−7.3)	11.0 (−11.7)	4.7 (−15.2)	19.8 (−6.8)
Source: PRISM Climate Group

=== Ecology ===
According to the A. W. Kuchler U.S. Potential natural vegetation Types, Hartsel would have a wheatgrass / needlegrass (66) vegetation type and a north mixed grass prairie (7) vegetation form.

== Demographics ==
The United States Census Bureau defined the Hartsel CDP for the United States Census 2020

Hartsel CDP, Colorado
Year	Pop.	±%
2020	38	—
Source: United States Census Bureau

== See also ==
- List of census-designated places in Colorado
