= North Star Mountain (Colorado) =

Mountain in Colorado, United States

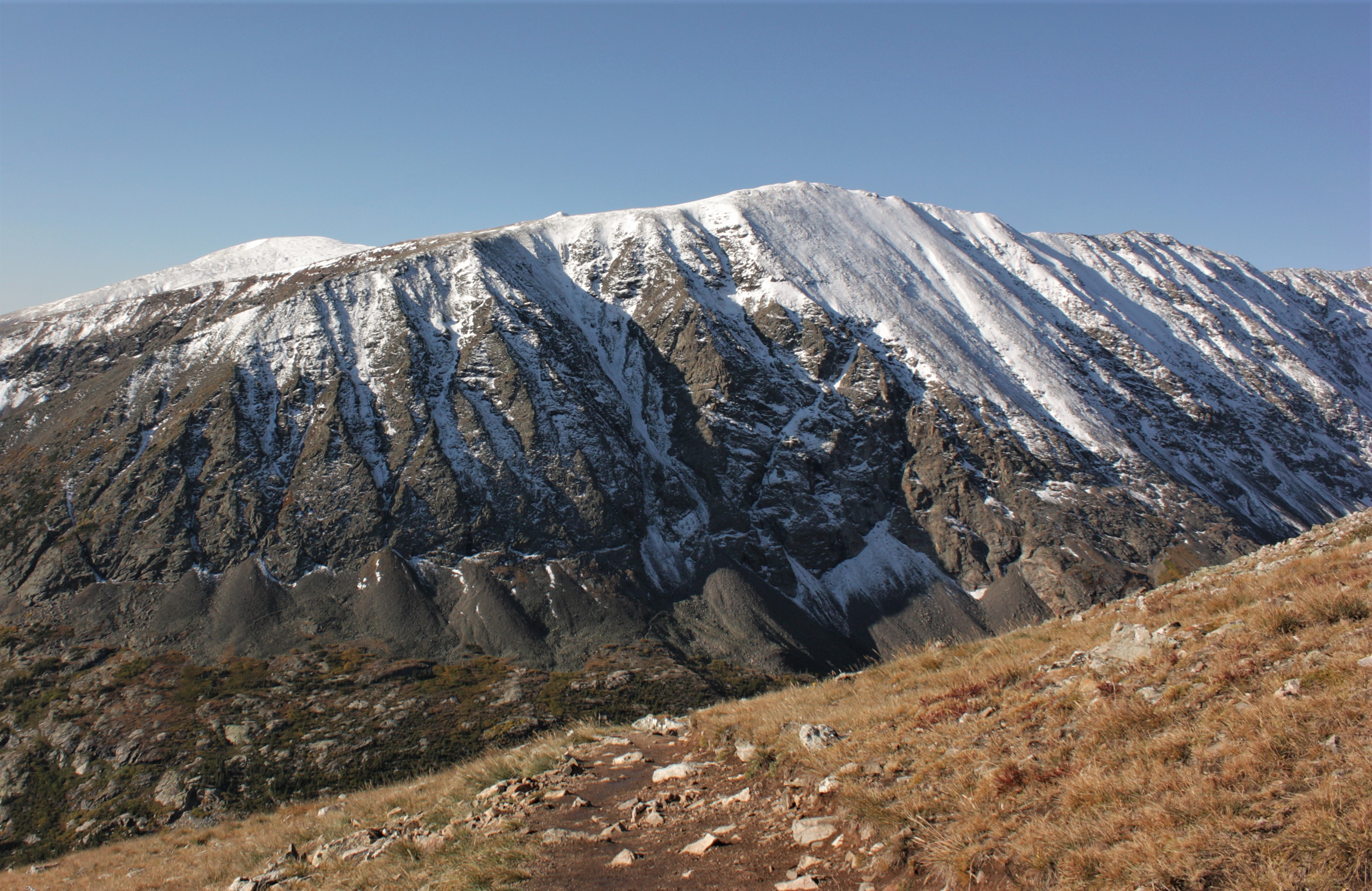
- North aspect

Highest point
- Elevation: 13,614 ft (4,150 m)
- Prominence: 414 ft (126 m)
- Parent peak: Wheeler Mountain (13,690 ft)
- Isolation: 0.82 mi (1.32 km)
- Coordinates: 39°22′39″N 106°06′28″W

Geography
- Location within Colorado Location within the United States
- Country: United States
- State: Colorado
- County: Park County / Summit County
- Parent range: Rocky Mountains; Mosquito Range
- Topo map: USGS Breckenridge

Geology
- Rock age: Cambrian
- Rock type(s): Limestone, Sawatch Quartzite

Climbing
- Easiest route: Hiking class 2

North Star Mountain is a 13,614-foot (4,150 m) mountain summit on the shared border of Park County and Summit County, in Colorado, United States.

== Description ==
North Star Mountain is set on the Continental Divide 3.5 miles (5.6 km) west of Hoosier Pass in the Mosquito Range which is a subrange of the Rocky Mountains. It ranks as the 187th-highest peak in Colorado. The mountain is located 9 miles (14 km) south-southwest of the community of Breckenridge on land managed by Arapaho National Forest and Pike National Forest. Precipitation runoff from the mountain's south slope drains into headwaters of the Middle Fork South Platte River and the north slope drains to the Blue River via Monte Cristo Creek. Topographic relief is significant as the summit rises 2,000 feet (610 m) above the Platte in one mile (1.6 km) and 1,600 feet (488 m) above Monte Cristo Creek in one-half mile (0.80 km). An ascent of the peak involves hiking eight miles (13 km) with 2,400 feet (732 m) of elevation gain. The mountain's toponym has been officially adopted by the United States Board on Geographic Names, and has been recorded in publications since at least 1884.

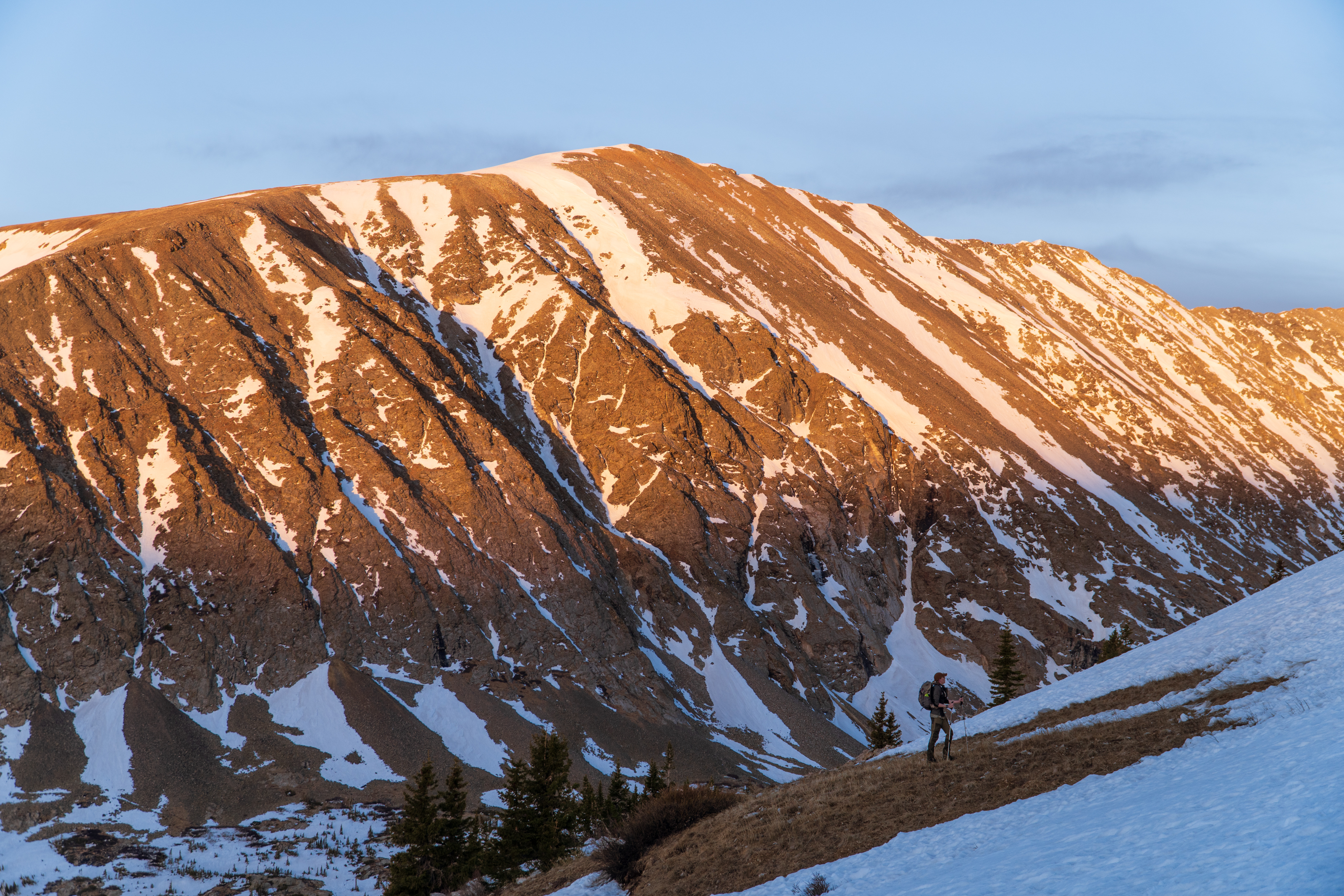
Sunrise on North Star

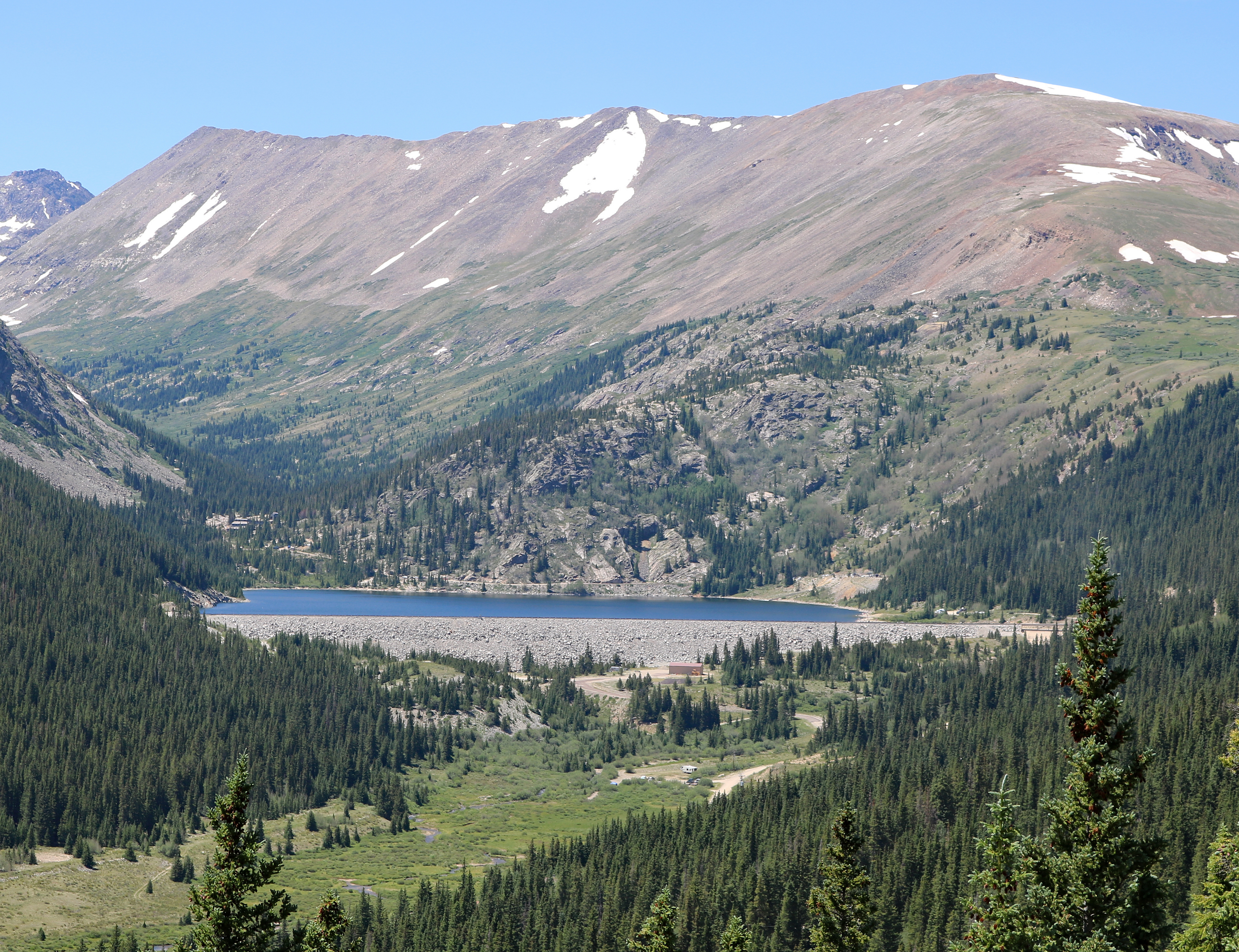
Southeast aspect of North Star Mountain beyond Montgomery Reservoir

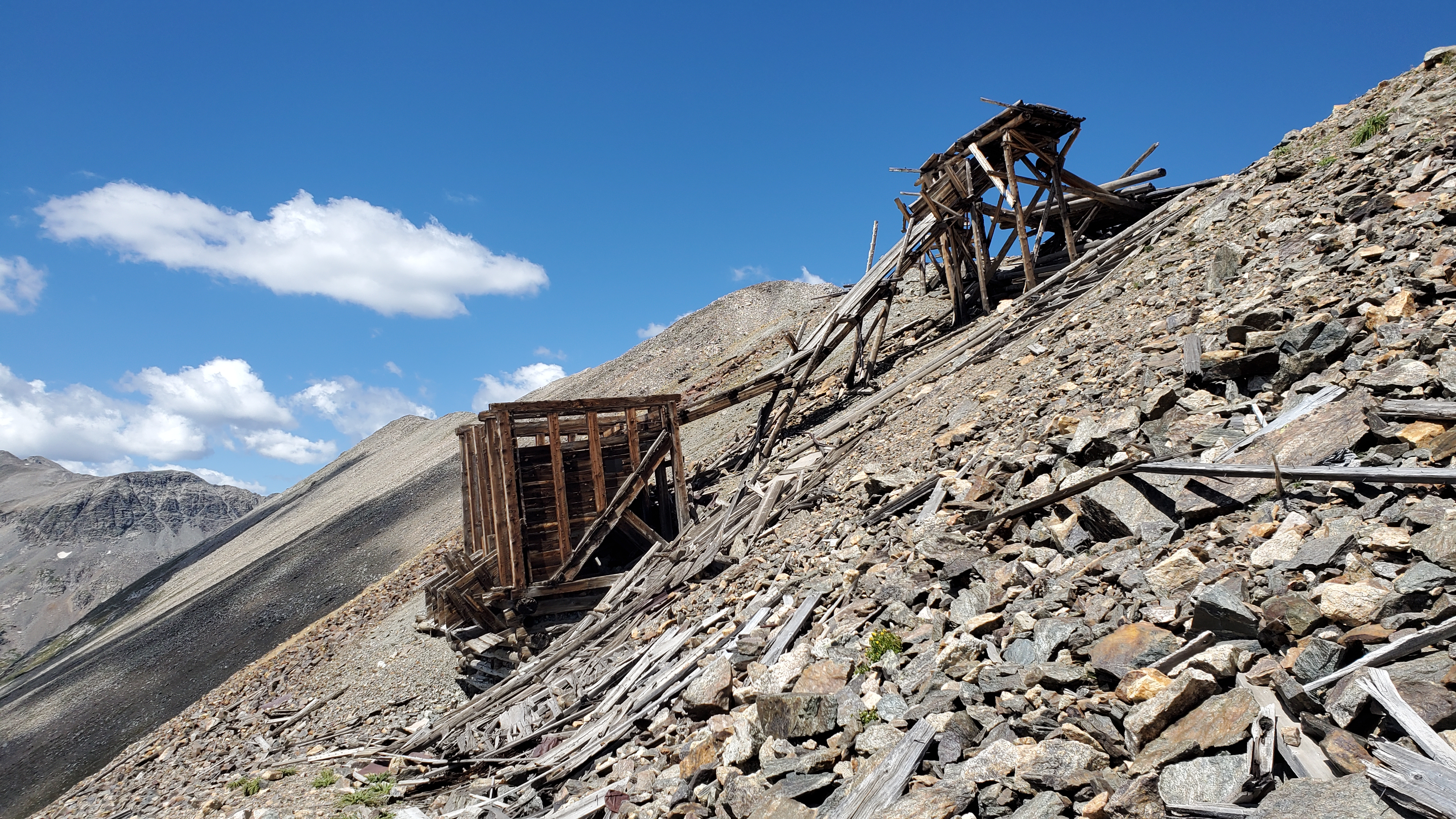
An Abandoned Mine on the side of the mountain

== Climate ==
According to the Köppen climate classification system, North Star Mountain is located in an alpine subarctic climate zone with cold, snowy winters, and cool to warm summers. Due to its altitude, it receives precipitation all year, as snow in winter, and as thunderstorms in summer, with a dry period in late spring.

== See also ==
- List of mountain peaks of Colorado
- Thirteener
