= Montgomery Reservoir =

Reservoir in Park County, Colorado, United States

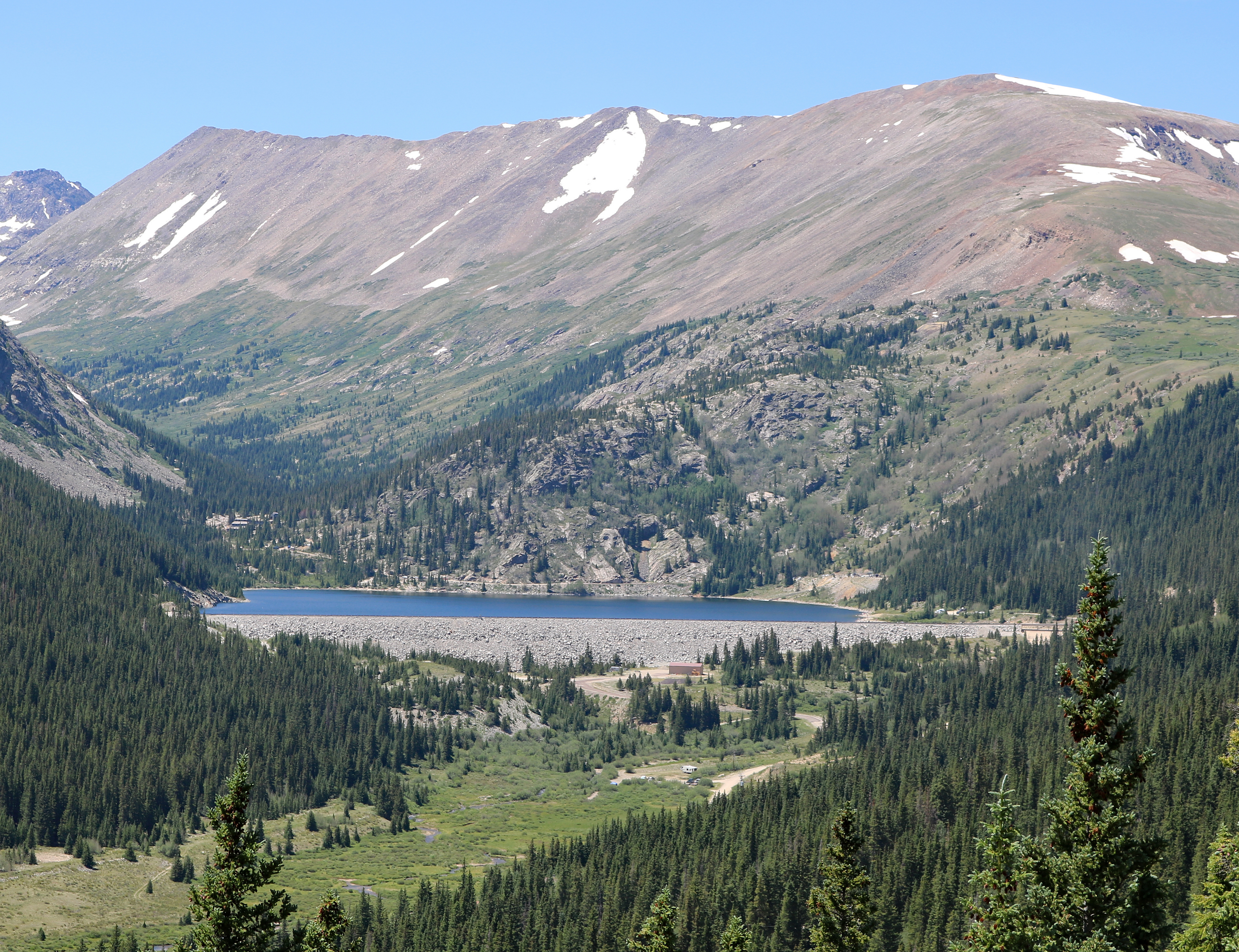
- The reservoir and dam viewed from Highway 9 (North Star Mountain in the background)

- Montgomery Reservoir
- Location: Park County, Colorado
- Coordinates: 39°21′20″N 106°04′33″W
- Primary inflows: Middle Fork South Platte River; Hoosier Tunnel
- Primary outflows: Blue River Pipeline
- Basin countries: United States
- Managing agency: Water Resources Department, Colorado Springs Utilities
- Built: 1957
- Surface area: 95 acres (38 hectares)
- Water volume: 5,088 acre-feet (6,276,000 cubic metres)
- Surface elevation: 10,873 feet (3,314 meters)
- Frozen: in winter

Montgomery Reservoir lies high in Colorado's Mosquito Range near Hoosier Pass a few miles north of Alma, Colorado. The reservoir sits at an altitude of 10,873 feet (3,314 meters). It is owned by Colorado Springs Utilities and delivers water to Colorado Springs, Colorado for municipal use. Built in 1957, the reservoir stores water from the Middle Fork South Platte River and from a tunnel that brings water from the Blue River on the west side of the continental divide.

== Transbasin diversion ==
Most of the water entering the reservoir comes through the Hoosier Tunnel which collects water from the Blue River watershed on the west side of the continental divide and conveys it to the east side, an instance of a transbasin diversion. Because the reservoir lies near the top of the headwaters of the Middle Fork South Platte River, the watershed above the dam is rather small — only 7.7 square miles (20 square kilometers) in size, so its catchment basin is limited. Thus the chief source of the lake's water is the Hoosier Tunnel.

The reservoir is drained by the Blue River Pipeline, a 70-mile (110-kilometer) long pipeline that flows by gravity to the Colorado Springs Utilities-owned North and South Catamount reservoirs on the slopes of Pikes Peak. From there, the water is treated and delivered to municipal water customers in Colorado Springs.

== Dam ==
Montgomery Dam is a rockfill structure. It is approximately 1,900 feet (580 meters) long and 113 feet (34 meters) high. When it was built, the dam was sealed with an asphalt concrete facing.
