= Mount Silverheels =

Mountain in United States of America

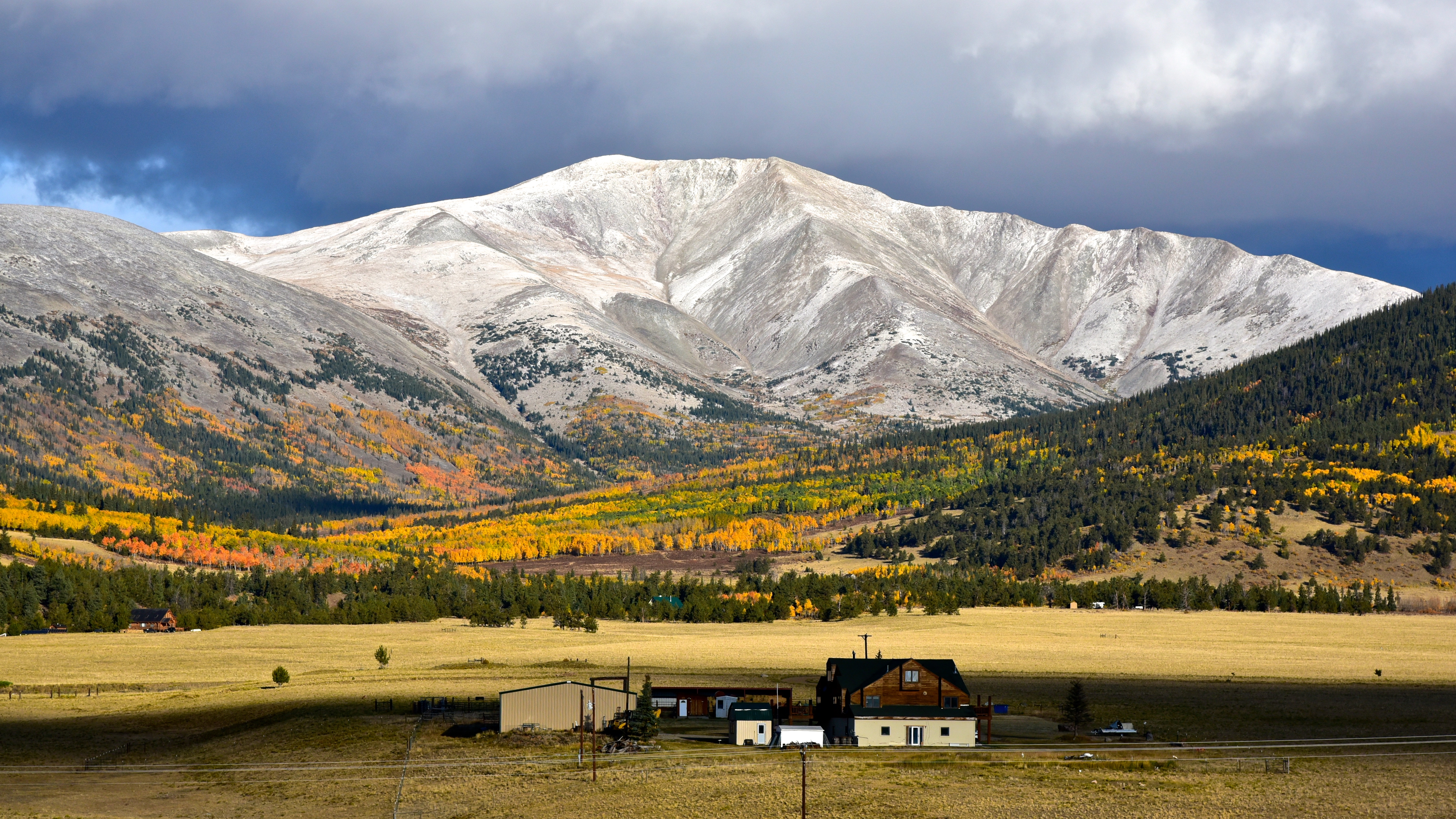
- Mount Silverheels southeast aspect

Highest point
- Elevation: 13,829 ft (4,215 m)
- Prominence: 2,283 ft (696 m)
- Isolation: 5.48 mi (8.82 km)
- Listing: North America highest peaks 73rd; US highest major peaks 55th; Colorado highest major peaks 29th
- Coordinates: 39°20′22″N 106°00′19″W

Geography
- Location within Colorado
- Location: Park County, Colorado, U.S.
- Parent range: Front Range
- Topo map(s): USGS 7.5' topographic map Alma, Colorado

Climbing
- Easiest route: hike

Mount Silverheels is a high and prominent mountain summit in the Front Range of the Rocky Mountains of North America. The 13,829-foot (4,215 m) thirteener is located in Pike National Forest, 4.9 miles (7.9 km) northeast (bearing 41°) of the Town of Alma in Park County, Colorado, United States.

Mount Silverheels is just east of two fourteeners: Mount Bross and Mount Lincoln.

== Climate ==
According to the Köppen climate classification system, the mountain is located in an alpine subarctic climate zone with cold, snowy winters, and cool to warm summers. Due to its altitude, it receives precipitation all year, as snow in winter, and as thunderstorms in summer, with a dry period in late spring.

== See also ==
- List of mountain peaks of North America
  - List of mountain peaks of the United States
    - List of mountain peaks of Colorado
