= Wheeler Mountain =

Mountain in the state of Colorado

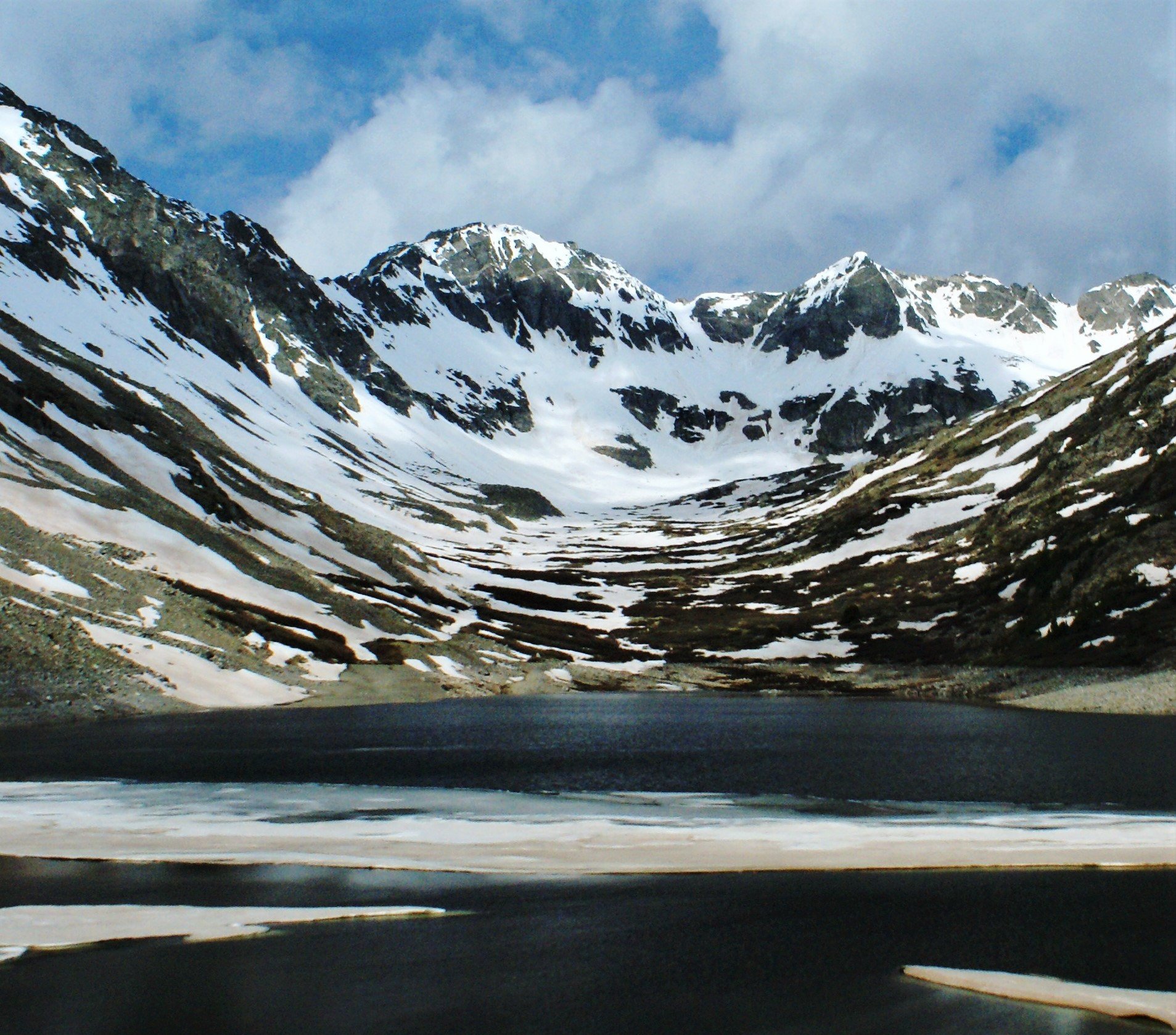
- East aspect, from Blue Lakes

Highest point
- Elevation: 13,690 ft (4,173 m)
- Prominence: 317 ft (97 m)
- Parent peak: Clinton Peak (13,864 ft)
- Isolation: 1.09 mi (1.75 km)
- Coordinates: 39°22′49″N 106°08′09″W

Naming
- Etymology: John S. Wheeler

Geography
- Location within Colorado Location within the United States
- Country: United States
- State: Colorado
- County: Summit
- Parent range: Rocky Mountains; Mosquito Range
- Topo map: USGS Copper Mountain

Climbing
- Easiest route: Scrambling class 3

Wheeler Mountain is a 13,690-foot (4,173 m) summit in Summit County, Colorado, United States.

== Description ==
Wheeler Mountain is set on the Continental Divide 4.5 miles (7.2 km) west-northwest of Hoosier Pass. It is part of the Mosquito Range which is a subrange of the Rocky Mountains. It ranks as the 150th-highest peak in Colorado. The summit is in Summit County, however the southwest and southeast slopes lie within Lake and Park counties, respectively. The mountain is located 9 miles (14 km) south-southwest of the community of Breckenridge on land managed by Arapaho National Forest and Pike National Forest. Precipitation runoff from the mountain's west slope drains into Clinton Creek; the southeast slope drains into Wheeler Lake thence to the Middle Fork South Platte River; and the northeast slope drains to the Blue River via Monte Cristo Creek. Topographic relief is significant as the summit rises 1,970 feet (600 m) above Clinton Creek in one-half mile (0.80 km). The mountain's toponym has been officially adopted by the United States Board on Geographic Names.

== Climate ==
According to the Köppen climate classification system, Wheeler Mountain is located in an alpine subarctic climate zone with cold, snowy winters, and cool to warm summers. Due to its altitude, it receives precipitation all year, as snow in winter, and as thunderstorms in summer, with a dry period in late spring.

== See also ==
- List of mountain peaks of Colorado
- Thirteener
