= Mount Bross =

Mountain in the state of Colorado

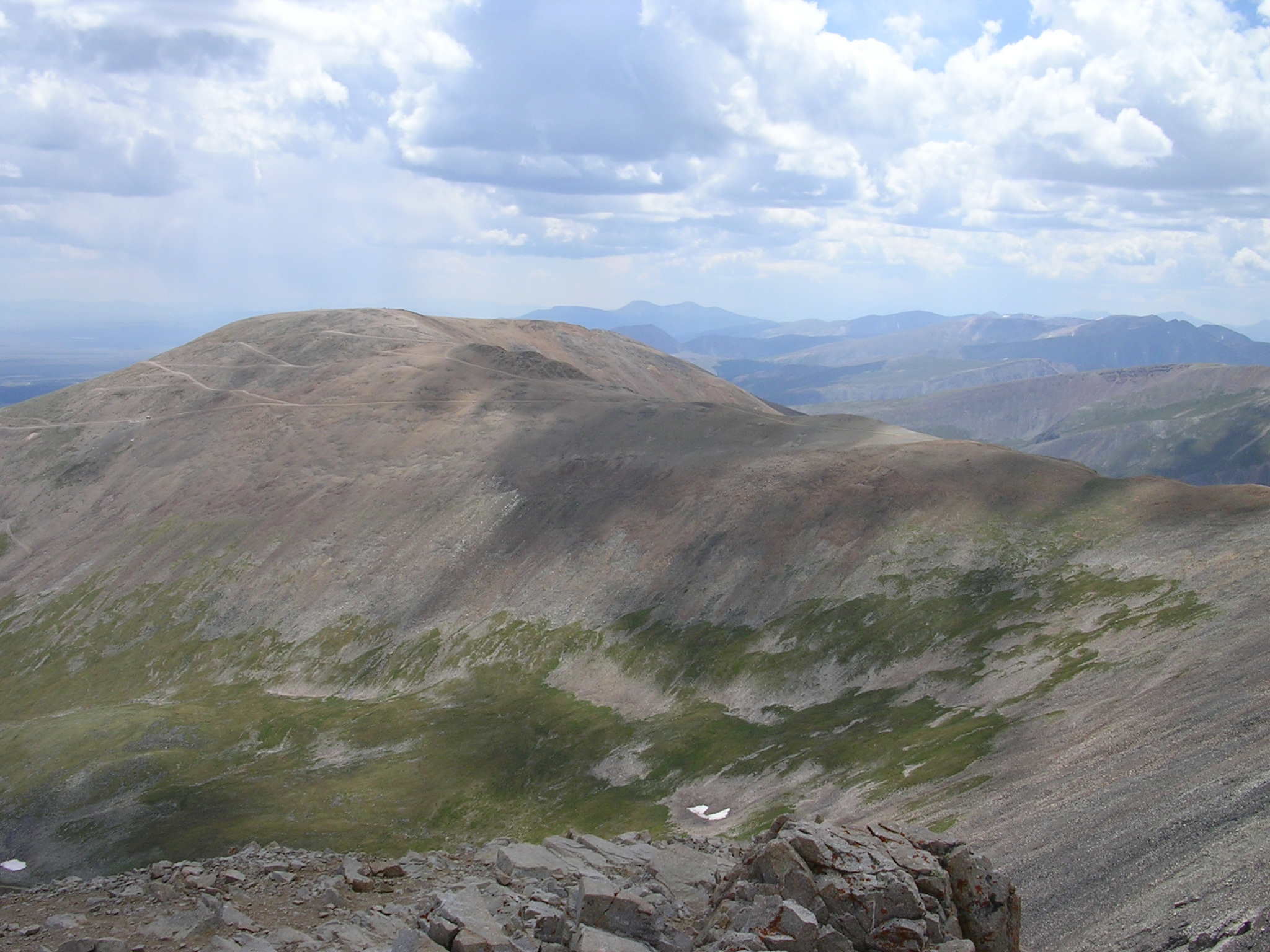

Highest point
- Elevation: 14,178 ft (4,321 m)
- Prominence: 312 ft (95 m)
- Parent peak: Mount Cameron
- Isolation: 0.99 mi (1.59 km)
- Listing: Colorado Fourteener 22nd
- Coordinates: 39°20′08″N 106°06′28″W

Geography
- Location within Colorado
- Location: Park County, Colorado, U.S.
- Parent range: Mosquito Range
- Topo map(s): USGS 7.5' topographic map Alma, Colorado

Climbing
- Easiest route: East Slopes: Hike, class 1

Mount Bross is a high mountain summit in the Mosquito Range of the Rocky Mountains of North America. The 14,178-foot (4,321 m) fourteener is located in Pike National Forest, 4.1 miles (6.6 km) northwest by north (bearing 327°) of the Town of Alma in Park County, Colorado, United States. Mount Bross is named in honor of William Bross, who owned property in the area.

== Geography ==
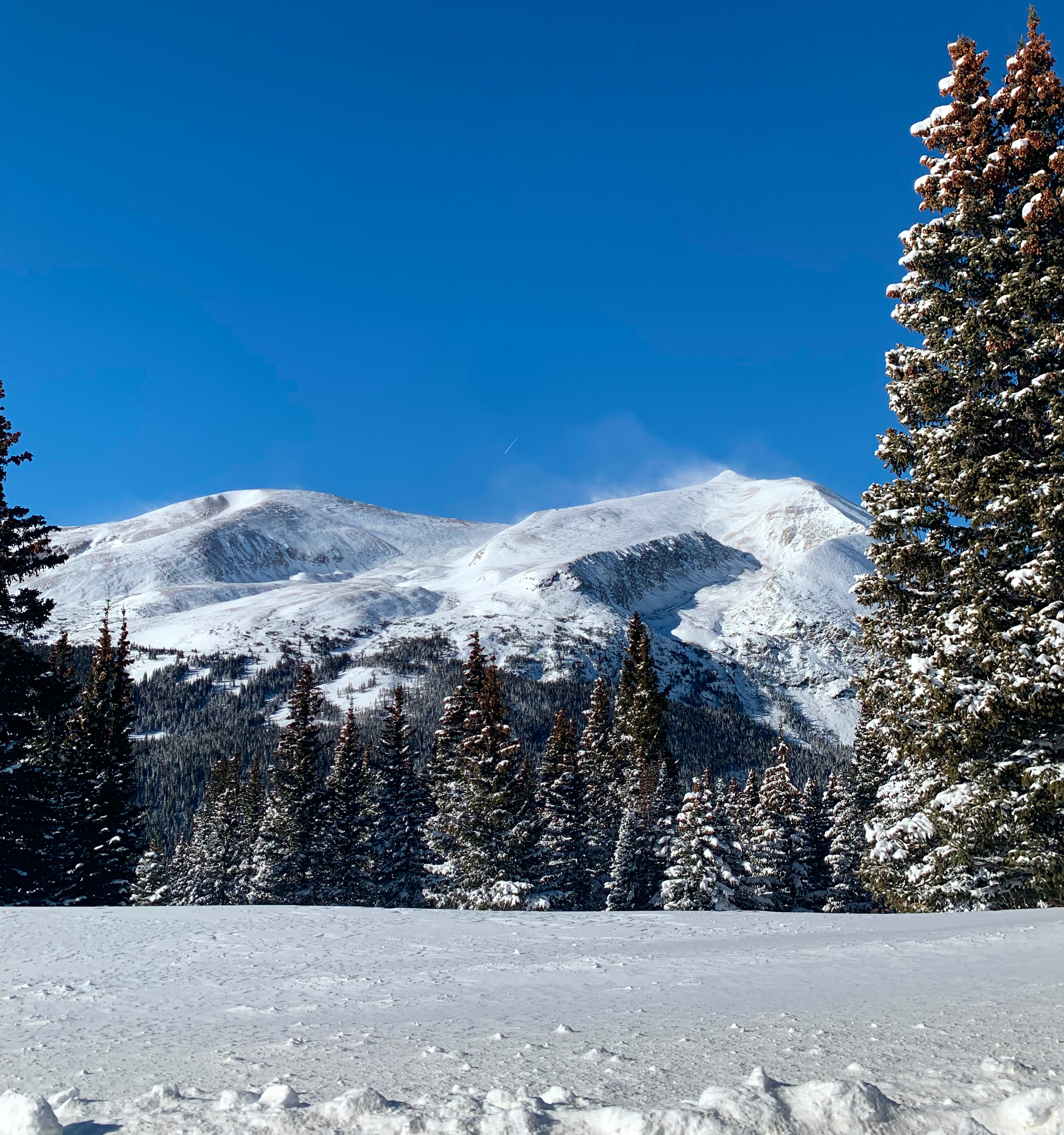
Mount Bross (left) and Mount Lincoln (right) as viewed from Colorado State Highway 9

It is often climbed together with Mount Lincoln and nearby Mount Democrat.

In 2005, the summit of Mount Bross was closed to the public because of safety concerns related to mines and trail access through private land.

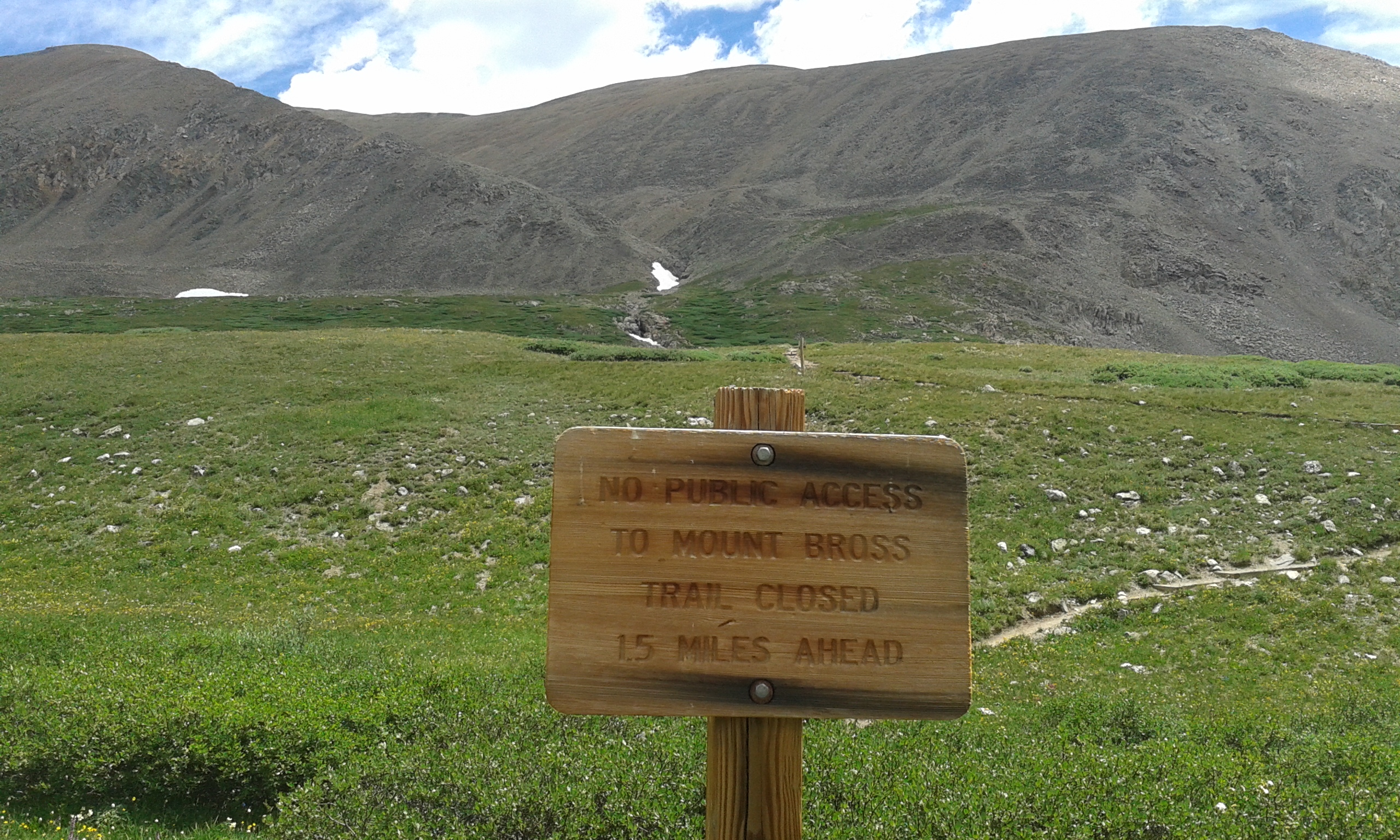
"No Public Access" sign near Kite Lake.

== See also ==
- List of mountain peaks of Colorado
  - List of Colorado fourteeners
