= Mount Democrat =

Mountain in Colorado, United States

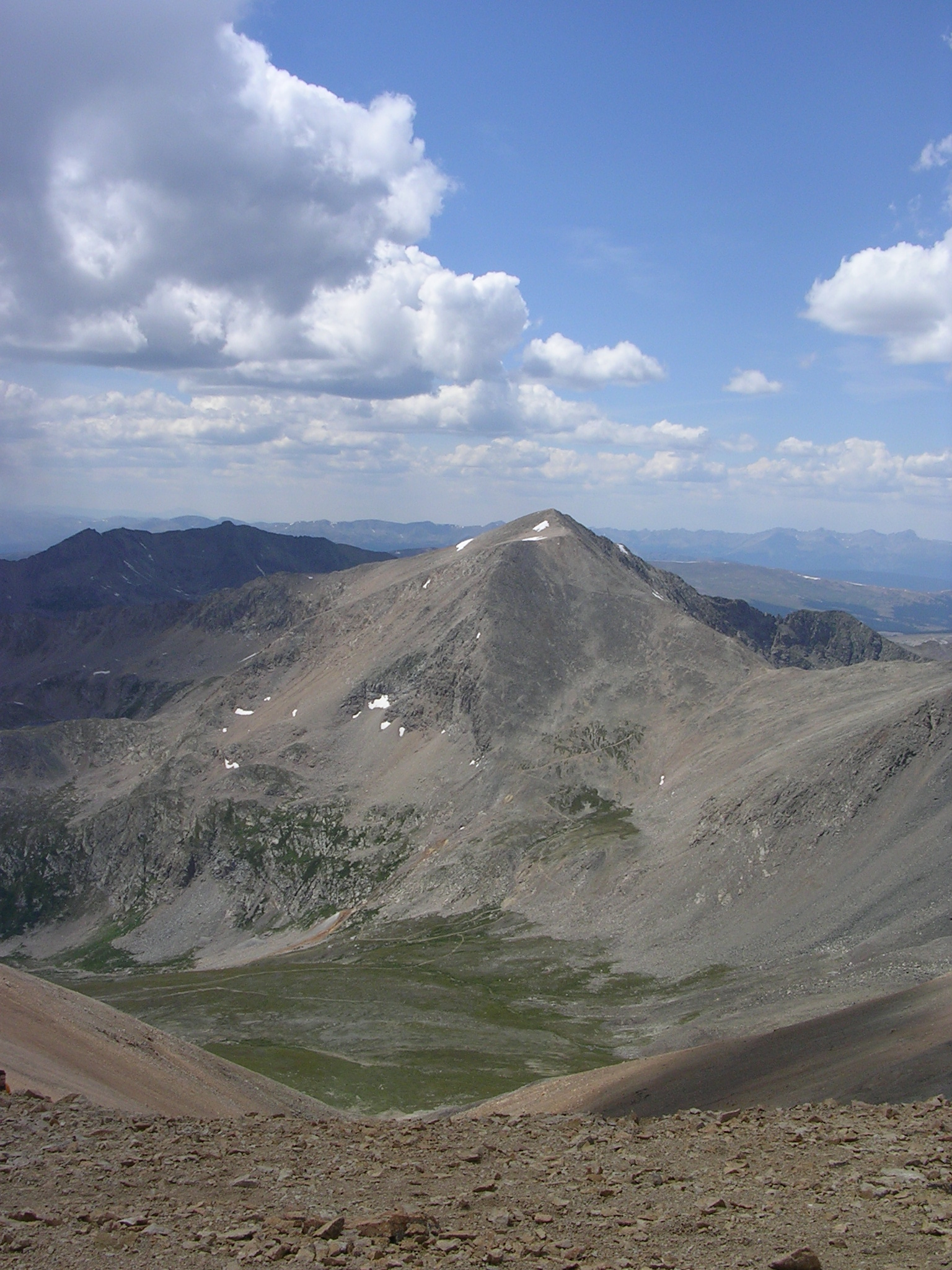
- Mount Democrat as seen from Mount Bross

Highest point
- Elevation: 14,152.3 ft (4,313.6 m); NAPGD2022
- Prominence: 768 ft (234 m)
- Isolation: 1.27 mi (2.04 km)
- Listing: Colorado Fourteener 28th
- Coordinates: 39°20′23″N 106°08′24″W

Geography
- Location within Colorado
- Location: Lake and Park counties, Colorado, U.S.
- Parent range: Mosquito Range
- Topo map(s): USGS 7.5' topographic map Climax, Colorado

Climbing
- Easiest route: East Slope: Hike, class 2

Mount Democrat is a 14,152-foot mountain located in the Mosquito Range of central Colorado. It is one of the state's 58 fourteeners and is commonly climbed by hikers because of its relatively easy trail. Mount Democrat is often part of the DeCaLiBron Loop, which connects four nearby peaks. The mountain also has a history of mining, with old mine remains still visible. Access to the mountain has changed over time because of private land issues, but public access has recently been restored.

== Location ==
Mount Democrat is a mountain summit in the Mosquito Range of the Rocky Mountains of North America. The 14,152.3-foot (4,314 m) fourteener is located 5.4 miles (8.7 km) northwest (bearing 313°) of the town of Alma, Colorado, United States, near the Continental Divide separating San Isabel National Forest and Lake County from Pike National Forest and Park County.

== Trail ==
The trail for Mount Democrat starts at Kite Lake Trailhead and is about 3.9 miles total. The elevation gain is about 2,156 feet with a Class 2 difficulty (rugged conditions, loose rock). It is a relatively popular mountain with trails that are maintained.

The exposure on this trail is very low, meaning that there are not any dangerously steep portions. However, there is loose rock, which can make descending the mountain more challenging. It is easy to slip on rocks since Mount Democrat is more of a granite peak than many of its neighboring mountains.

The easiest way up the mountain is through the saddle between Mount Democrat, Mount Cameron, and Mount Lincoln. The climb itself involves dirt roads, switchbacks, an ascent up the saddle, a false summit, and then a steeper climb up to the peak in a field of loose rock.

To complete the hike, you can either go on to the DeCaLiBron Loop or simply retrace your steps and go back down.

== DeCaLiBron Loop ==
Alternatively, Mount Democrat is often climbed as part of the DeCaLiBron Loop, which combines Mount Democrat, Mount Cameron, Mount Lincoln, and Mount Bross. Mount Democrat is usually the first mountain climbed in this loop. The DeCaLiBron Loop is located within Pike National Forest and is usually accessed via Kite Lake Trailhead. The route is approximately 11.7 kilometers (7.3 miles) in length and has an elevation gain of about 1,017 meters (3,337 feet). However, the summits of Lincoln and Bross are considered private land. Luckily, Mount Democrat has been available since 2023 when the Conservation Fund bought the Kite Lake Trailhead. Access to Lincoln and Bross is still restricted.

Hikers on the loop will experience strong winds and weather conditions that can change quickly due to elevation. Winter climbs are only recommended for experienced hikers with snowshoes.

=== Trailhead access ===
The Conservation Fund, a non-profit organization that protects land and water resources, acquired 300 acres of Mount Democrat. The purchase includes the trailhead and summit, and the Conservation Fund intends to transfer the land to the United States Forest Service to ensure permanent public access.

Mount Democrat is one of Colorado's 58 fourteeners, peaks that rise above 14,000 feet in elevation. The fourteeners are a popular destination for hikers and climbers, and they can be a significant economic boon for small towns near the trailheads. However, annual visitors to Mount Democrat fell from 25,000 to 8,000 after the previous landowner closed the trailheads in 2021.

The Conservation Fund's purchase of Mount Democrat will ensure that the public continues to have access to Mount Democrat and will help support the businesses in the surrounding communities.

== Historical names ==
Before being called Mount Democrat, it was known as Republic Mountain and Mount Buckskin. The Buckskin name came from a nearby town that got its name from Joseph "Buckskin Joe" Higginbottom. After the naming of Mount Lincoln in 1861, Southerners who supported the Democratic Party gave the peak its current name, and it was put on official maps in 1883.

== Mining history ==
The Mosquito Range, which contains Mount Democrat, has a long history of mining. Along the trail on Mount Democrat are the remains of the Kentucky Belle Mine. This mine is located at about 12,400 feet. It mainly focused on gold mining, though it also mined silver. It was discovered in the 1900s and has no plans to reopen.

This points to a deeper history of mining around Mount Democrat. Gold and silver mining was so extensive on the mountain that it is important to be cautious when going off trail; there could be collapsing mining holes, shafts, and tunnels. In fact, the liability concerns that these dangers pose are the reason why landowners previously restricted access to Mount Democrat, though access has reopened since then.

== See also ==
- List of mountain peaks of Colorado
  - List of Colorado fourteeners
