= Hoosier Gulch =

Historic mining district in Colorado

- Mining district
- Location within Colorado
- Coordinates: 39°22′12″N 106°01′48″W

Area
  - Total: 97 ha (240 acres)
- Highest elevation: 3,430 m (11,250 ft)
- Lowest elevation: 3,200 m (10,500 ft)

The Hoosier Gulch was a mining district, also known as the Hoosier Pass district, and Overlaps Pollock, located along the Park-Summit County line, at the headwaters of the Blue River, ten miles south of Breckenridge, at over 10,000 feet in elevation.

== Mining operations ==
The mining district contained the Bemrose-Bostwick placer camp, founded by William Bemrose and Henry M. Bostwick, which primarily produced from 1871 to 1877 and between 1914 and 1941. The Bemrose-Bostwick placers were worked intermittently as there was not sufficient water, but had produced $25,000 worth of gold by 1879. In 1926 the camp was reportedly giving "good results" with a total of 8,572.58 ounces of gold mined (worth $177,210.96) as of 1921 but it still could only be mined for part of the year due to the water scarcity and the elevation. The district also contained other gold placer camps that were being worked by around 1860, and there were some operations as late as 1959.

== Discovery ==
The gulch was discovered by men from Indiana, "The Hoosier State," in 1860, providing its name, and it in turn provided the name of Hoosier Pass, located nearby.
