= Hoosier Pass =

Mountain pass in Colorado, USA

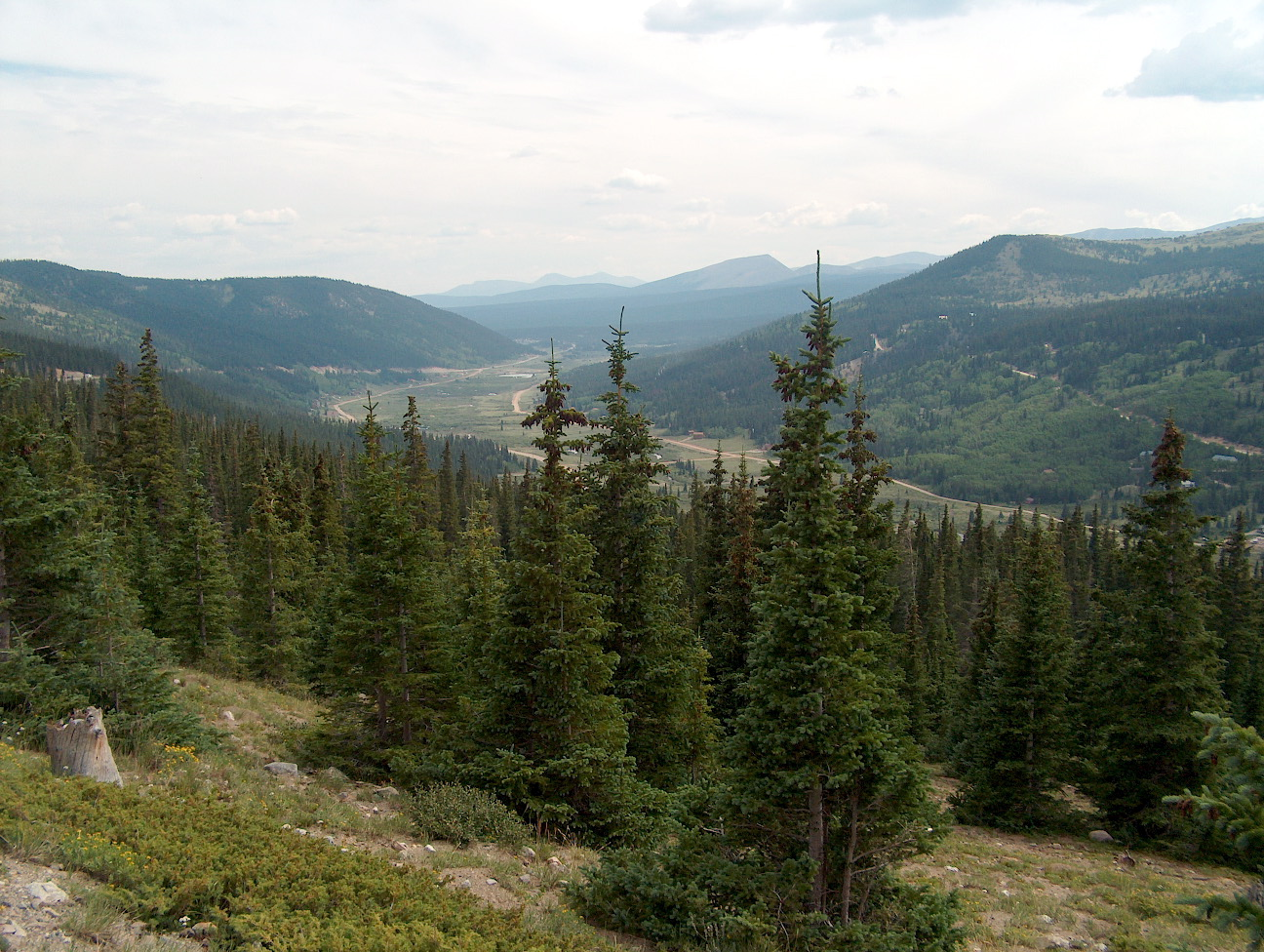
- View south from Hoosier Pass, towards Alma
- Interactive map of Hoosier Pass
- Elevation: 11,542 feet (3,518 m)
- Traversed by: SH 9

Third Approach
- Location: Park / Summit counties, Colorado, U.S.
- Range: Mosquito Range
- Coordinates: 39°21′42″N 106°03′45″W
- Topo map: USGS Alma

Hoosier Pass (elevation 11,542 ft (3,518 m)) is a high mountain pass in central Colorado, in the Rocky Mountains of the western United States. The name derives from the Hoosier Gulch, which was worked by men from Indiana, nicknamed the "Hoosier State".

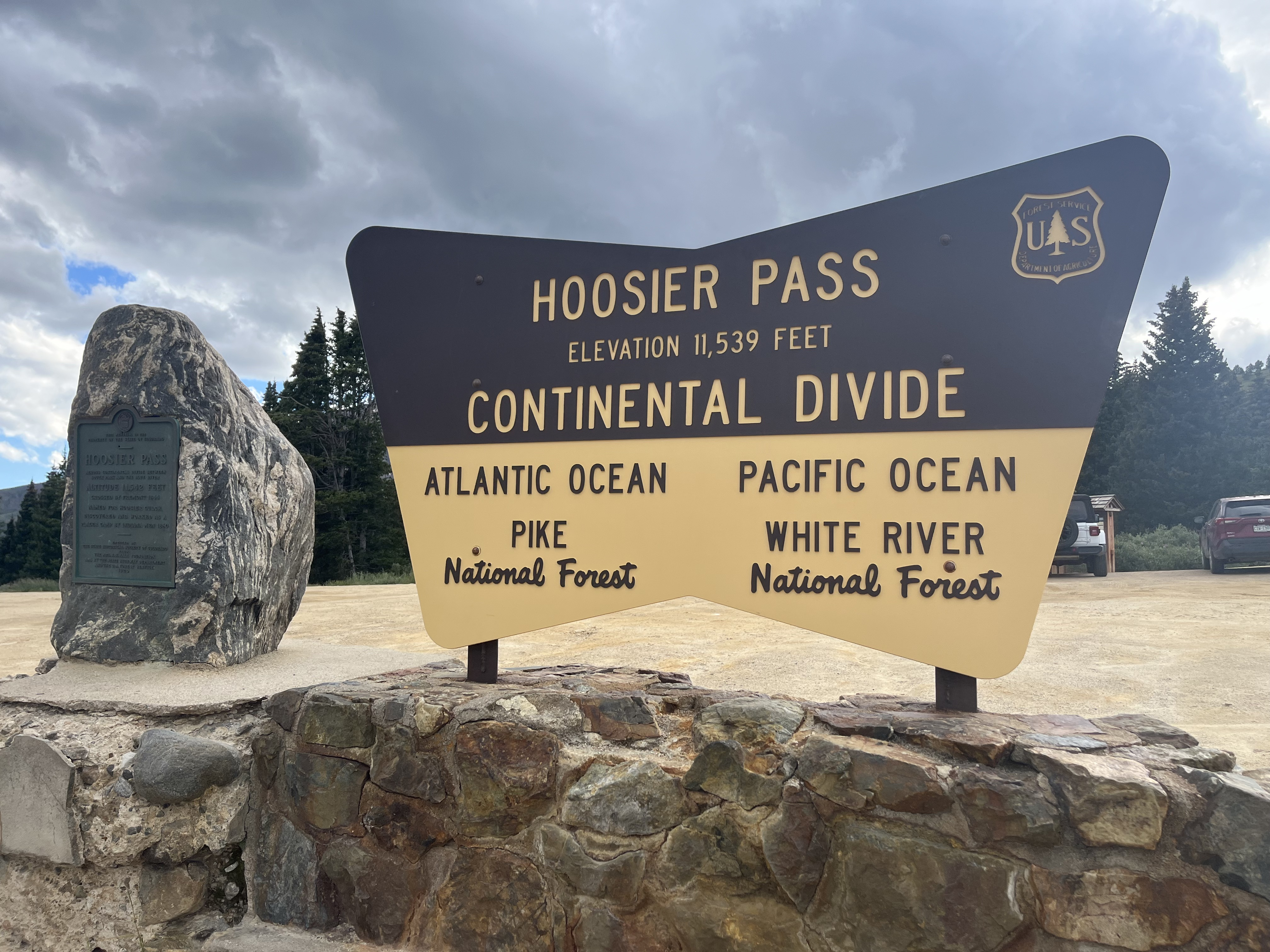
The U.S. Department of Agriculture's Forest Service sign at the Hoosier Pass on the Continental Divide, August 10, 2024

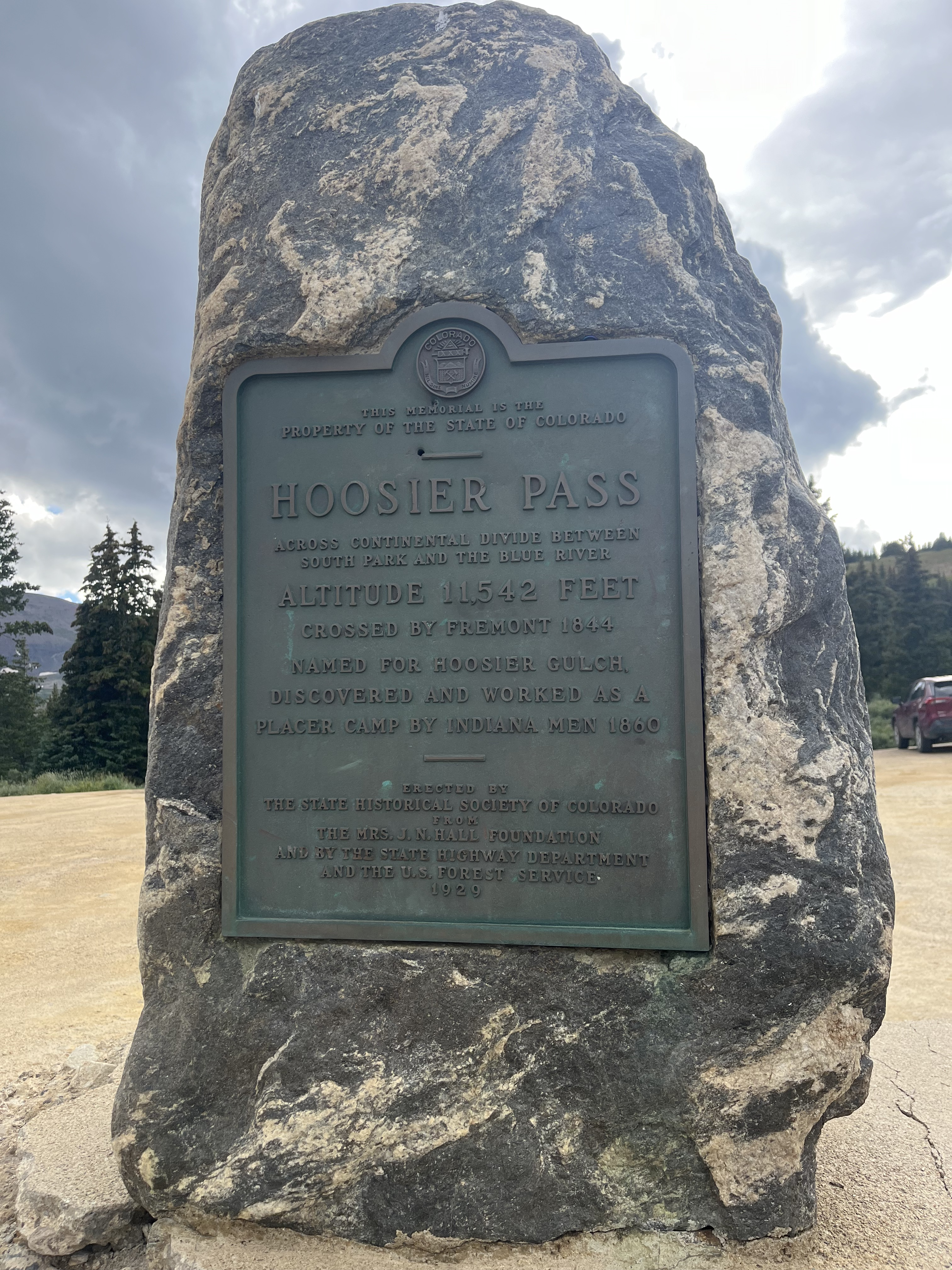
Memorial at the Hoosier Pass on the Continental Divide

The pass is located on the Continental Divide at the northern end of the Mosquito Range, in a gap between Mount Lincoln (west) and Hoosier Ridge (east). It sits on the boundary between Park (south) and Summit (north) counties.

The pass provides a route between the headwaters of the Blue River (tributary of the Colorado River) to the north and the headwaters of the South Platte River in South Park to the south. It is traversed by State Highway 9 between the towns of Breckenridge (north) and Fairplay (south).

The highway over the pass provides an alternative route from Denver to the ski areas near Breckenridge and Keystone. It is generally open all year round, is traversable by all vehicles in good weather, but is occasionally closed during winter storms. The road over the pass has a smooth approach on the south side but has several switchbacks on the north side with a grade of 8%.

This pass is the highest point on the TransAmerica Trail, a transcontinental bicycle route that stretches from Yorktown, Virginia to Astoria, Oregon.

== Water diversion ==
Hoosier Pass is the location of the oldest known transbasin diversion project in Colorado, a ditch diverting water from a tributary of the Blue River to the Middle Fork of the South Platte River. This water was used for placer mining near Fairplay.

By 1929, the 1.8 mile (2.9 km) East Hoosier Ditch and the 1.3 mile (2 km) West Hoosier Ditch were in operation, able to divert an aggregate 77 cubic feet per second (2.2 m^{3}/s) of water across the continental divide.

The City of Colorado Springs obtained the water rights to these ditches and constructed the Hoosier Pass Tunnel to replace them as part of the Continental-Hoosier Diversion System. The 10 foot (3 m) diameter 1.5 mile (2.4 km) water tunnel was completed in 1951 and delivers up to 500 cubic feet per second (14.2m^{3}/s) to Montgomery Reservoir about a mile southwest of the pass, from which the water is piped 70 miles (113 km) to Colorado Springs. Average annual diversions through the tunnel have been on the order of 9000 acre feet (11 million m^{3}).

== Another pass ==
There is another Hoosier Pass in Colorado (elevation 10,313 ft (3,143 m)) located in Teller County, near Cripple Creek.

== Climate ==
Hoosier Pass has a subarctic climate (Köppen Dfc).

Climate data for Hoosier Pass, Colorado, 1991–2020 normals: 11400ft (3475m)
Month	Jan	Feb	Mar	Apr	May	Jun	Jul	Aug	Sep	Oct	Nov	Dec	Year
Mean daily maximum °F (°C)	26.5 (−3.1)	28.8 (−1.8)	36.4 (2.4)	42.0 (5.6)	50.4 (10.2)	60.7 (15.9)	65.7 (18.7)	62.8 (17.1)	57.0 (13.9)	45.3 (7.4)	33.9 (1.1)	26.1 (−3.3)	44.6 (7.0)
Daily mean °F (°C)	17.0 (−8.3)	18.5 (−7.5)	25.0 (−3.9)	30.4 (−0.9)	39.1 (3.9)	48.5 (9.2)	53.8 (12.1)	51.7 (10.9)	45.8 (7.7)	35.0 (1.7)	24.4 (−4.2)	17.0 (−8.3)	33.9 (1.0)
Mean daily minimum °F (°C)	7.5 (−13.6)	8.1 (−13.3)	13.4 (−10.3)	18.7 (−7.4)	27.8 (−2.3)	36.2 (2.3)	41.8 (5.4)	40.6 (4.8)	34.5 (1.4)	24.8 (−4.0)	14.9 (−9.5)	7.9 (−13.4)	23.0 (−5.0)
Average precipitation inches (mm)	2.32 (59)	2.58 (66)	3.08 (78)	3.97 (101)	2.85 (72)	1.18 (30)	2.38 (60)	2.40 (61)	1.78 (45)	2.32 (59)	2.41 (61)	2.28 (58)	29.55 (750)
Source 1: XMACIS2
Source 2: NOAA (Precipitation)

== See also ==
- Hoosier Pass ipomopsis
