= Clinton Peak =

Mountain summit in Colorado, United States

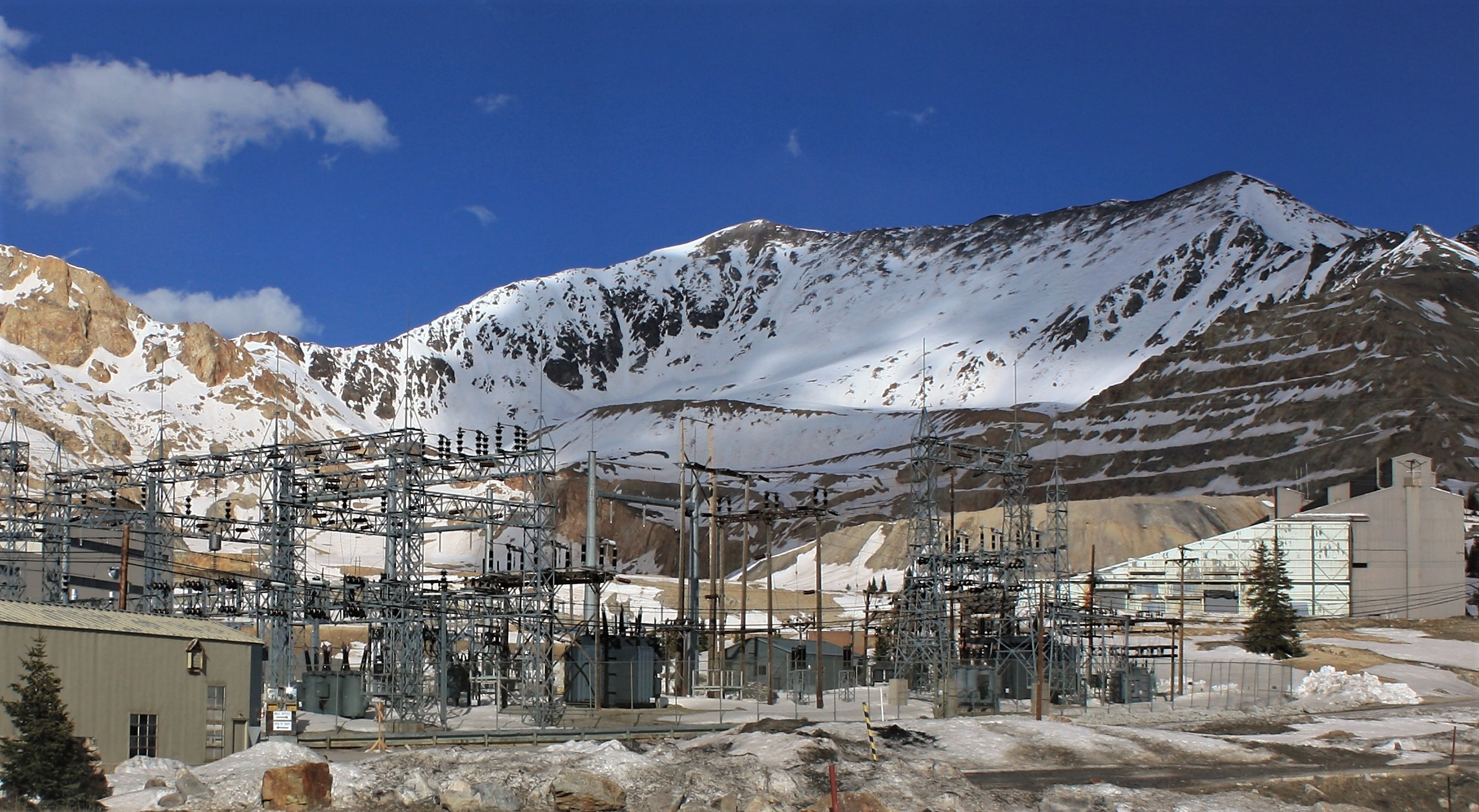
- West aspect

Highest point
- Elevation: 13,864 ft (4,226 m)
- Prominence: 517 ft (158 m)
- Isolation: 2.03 mi (3.27 km)
- Coordinates: 39°22′06″N 106°08′56″W

Geography
- Location within Colorado
- Location: Continental Divide between Lake and Park counties, Colorado, United States
- Parent range: Mosquito Range
- Topo map(s): USGS 7.5' topographic map Climax, Colorado

Clinton Peak is a high mountain summit in the Mosquito Range of the Rocky Mountains of North America, named after former U.S. president Bill Clinton. The 13,864-foot (4,226 m) thirteener is located 2.1 miles (3.3 km) east (bearing 86°) of Fremont Pass, Colorado, United States, on the Continental Divide separating San Isabel National Forest and Lake County from Pike National Forest and Park County.

== Climate ==
According to the Köppen climate classification system, the mountain is located in an alpine subarctic climate zone with cold, snowy winters, and cool to warm summers. Due to its altitude, it receives precipitation all year, as snow in winter, and as thunderstorms in summer, with a dry period in late spring.

== See also ==
- List of Colorado mountain ranges
- List of Colorado mountain summits
  - List of Colorado fourteeners
  - List of Colorado 4000 meter prominent summits
  - List of the most prominent summits of Colorado
- List of Colorado county high points

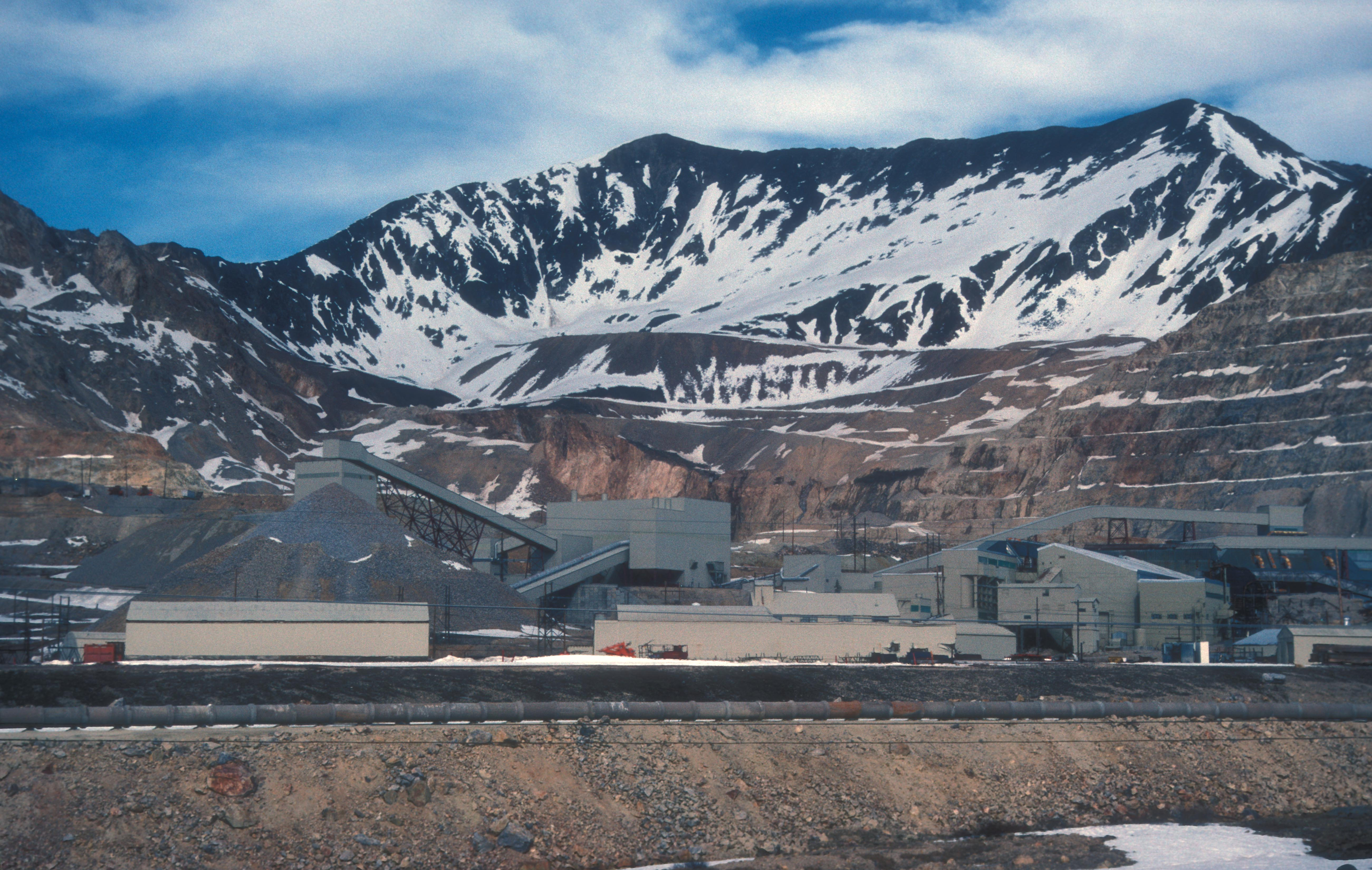
Clinton Peak rises behind Climax mine
