= Mount Cameron (Colorado) =

Mountain in Colorado, United States

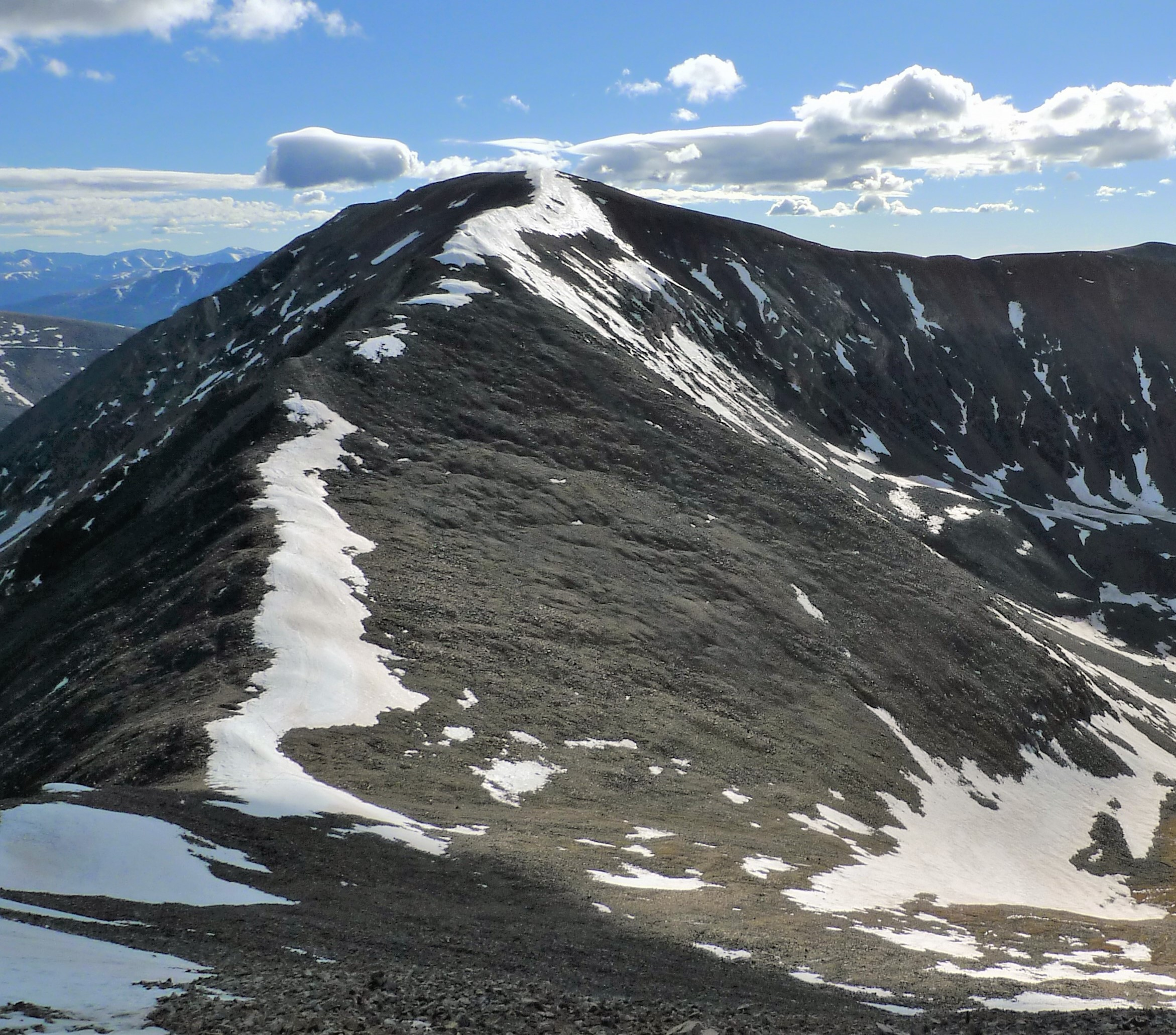
- West aspect

Highest point
- Elevation: 14,238 ft (4,340 m)
- Prominence: 152 ft (46 m)
- Parent peak: Mount Lincoln (14,293 ft)
- Isolation: 0.54 mi (0.87 km)
- Coordinates: 39°20′47″N 106°07′08″W

Geography
- Location within Colorado Location within the United States
- Country: United States
- State: Colorado
- County: Park
- Protected area: Pike National Forest
- Parent range: Rocky Mountains; Mosquito Range
- Topo map: USGS Alma

Climbing
- Easiest route: Hiking class 2

Mount Cameron is a 14,238-foot (4,340 m) mountain summit in Park County, Colorado, United States.

== Description ==
Mount Cameron is set east of the Continental Divide in the Mosquito Range, which is a subrange of the Rocky Mountains. It ranks as the 2nd-highest peak in Park County, 3rd-highest in the Mosquito Range, and the 18th-highest in Colorado. The mountain is located nine miles (14 km) south-southwest of the community of Breckenridge on land managed by Pike National Forest. Precipitation runoff from the mountain's slopes drains into the headwaters of the Middle Fork South Platte River. Topographic relief is significant as the summit rises over 2,500 feet (762 m) above the river in one mile (1.6 km).

== Etymology ==
The mountain's toponym has been officially adopted by the United States Board on Geographic Names, but there is no consensus as to who the landform is named after. One source claims that Simon Cameron (1799–1889) is the likely namesake. Simon Cameron was the United States Secretary of War under President Abraham Lincoln at the start of the American Civil War, and Mt. Cameron is approximately one-half mile southwest of line parent Mount Lincoln.

Another source claims that the mountain is named for General Robert Alexander Cameron (1828–1894), who supported the campaign of Abraham Lincoln for U.S. president and had ties to Colorado.

A third source states that either of these two gentlemen could possibly be the namesake.

== Climate ==
According to the Köppen climate classification system, Mount Cameron is located in an alpine subarctic climate zone with cold, snowy winters, and cool to warm summers. Due to its altitude, it receives precipitation all year, as snow in winter and as thunderstorms in summer, with a dry period in late spring.

== See also ==
- List of Colorado fourteeners

== Gallery ==
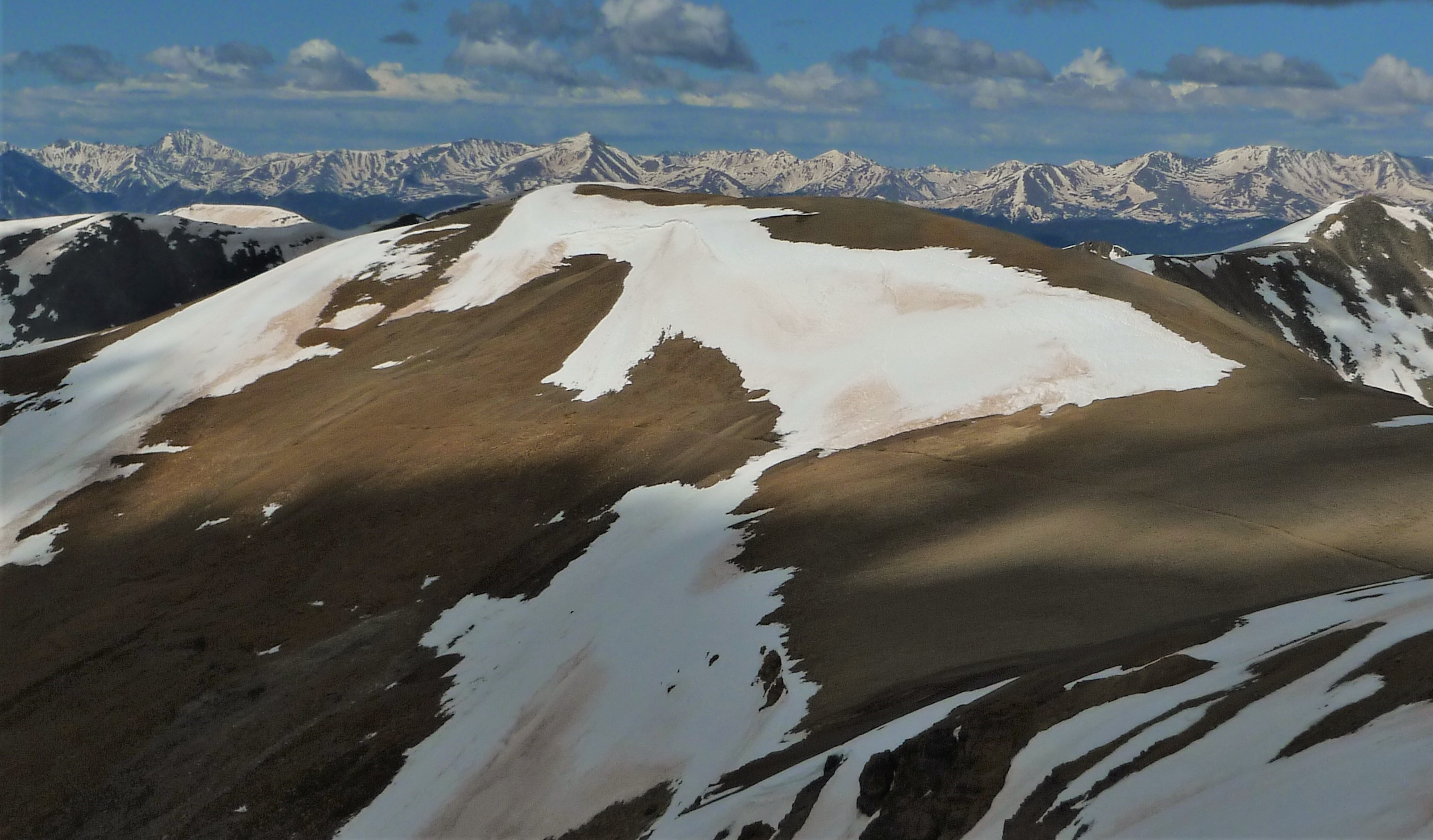
Northeast aspect of Mt. Cameron viewed from Mt. Lincoln

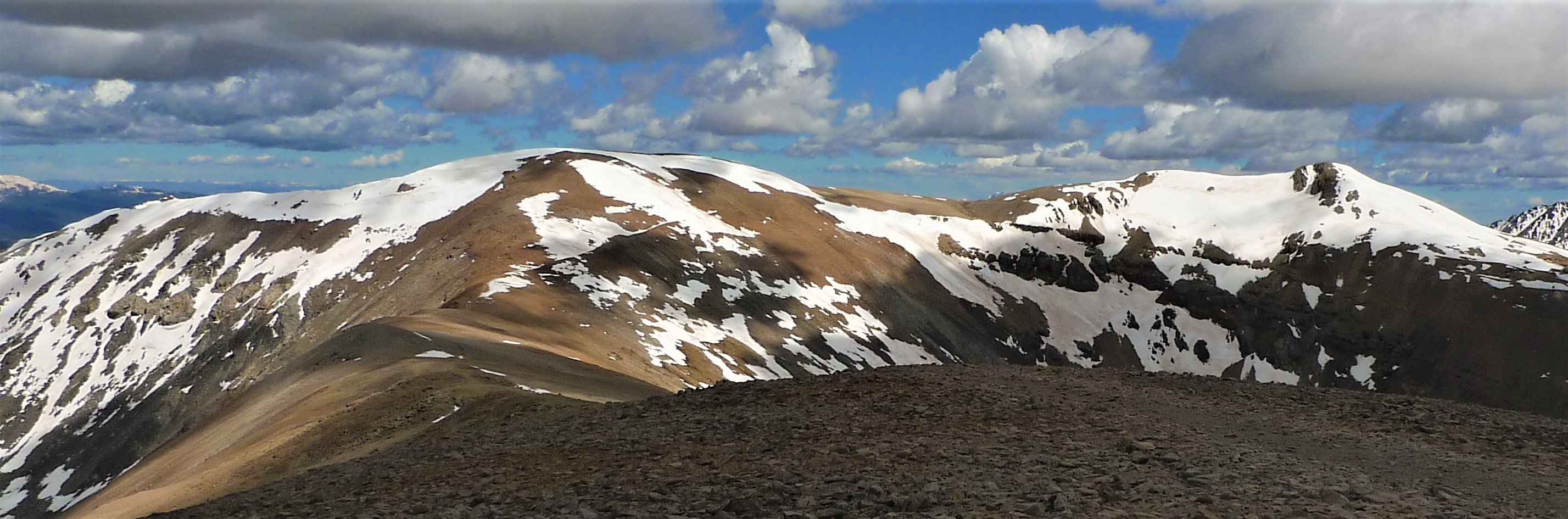
Mt. Cameron (left), Mt. Lincoln (right) viewed from Mt. Bross.

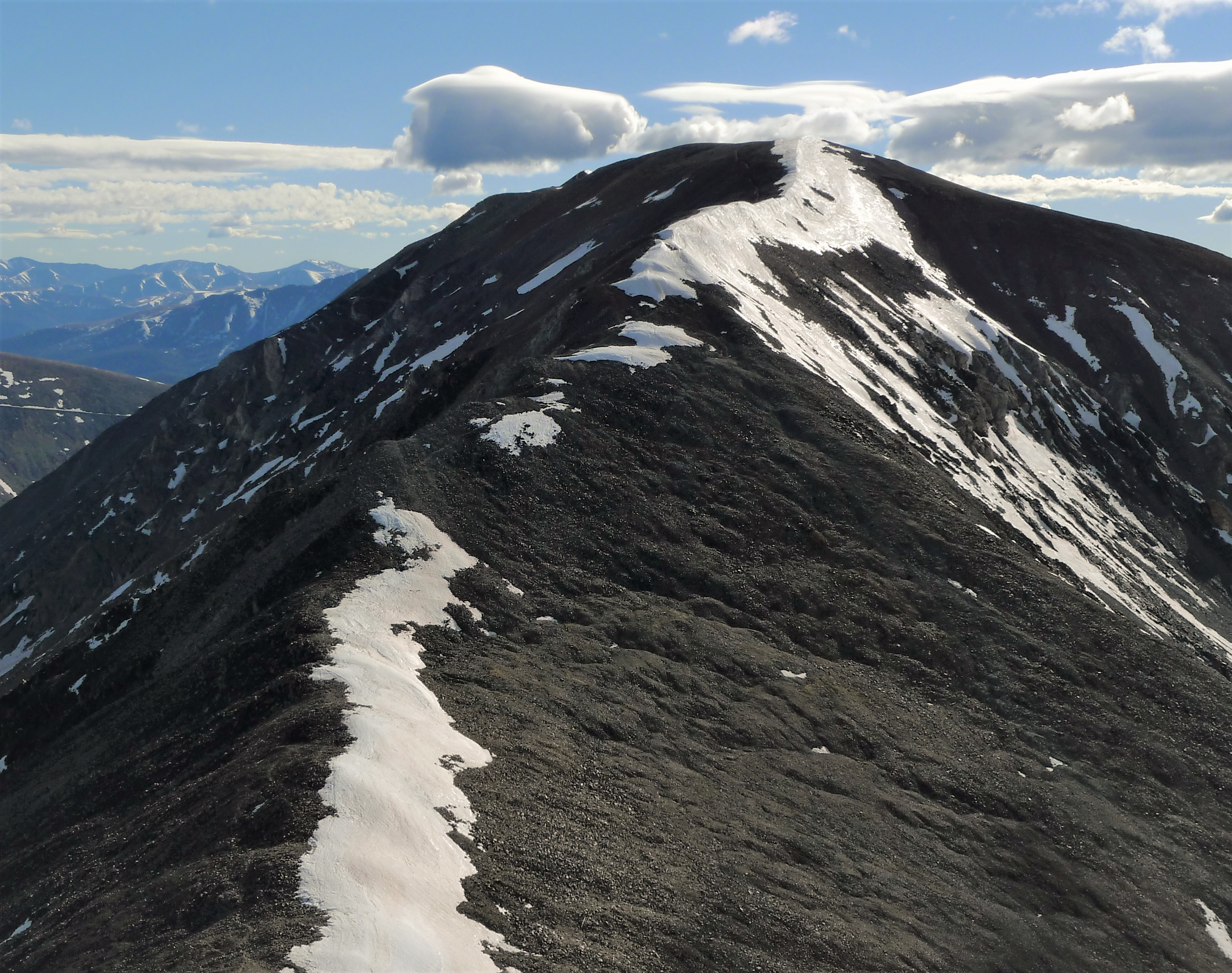
West aspect viewed from a hike up Mt. Democrat
