= Middle Fork South Platte River =

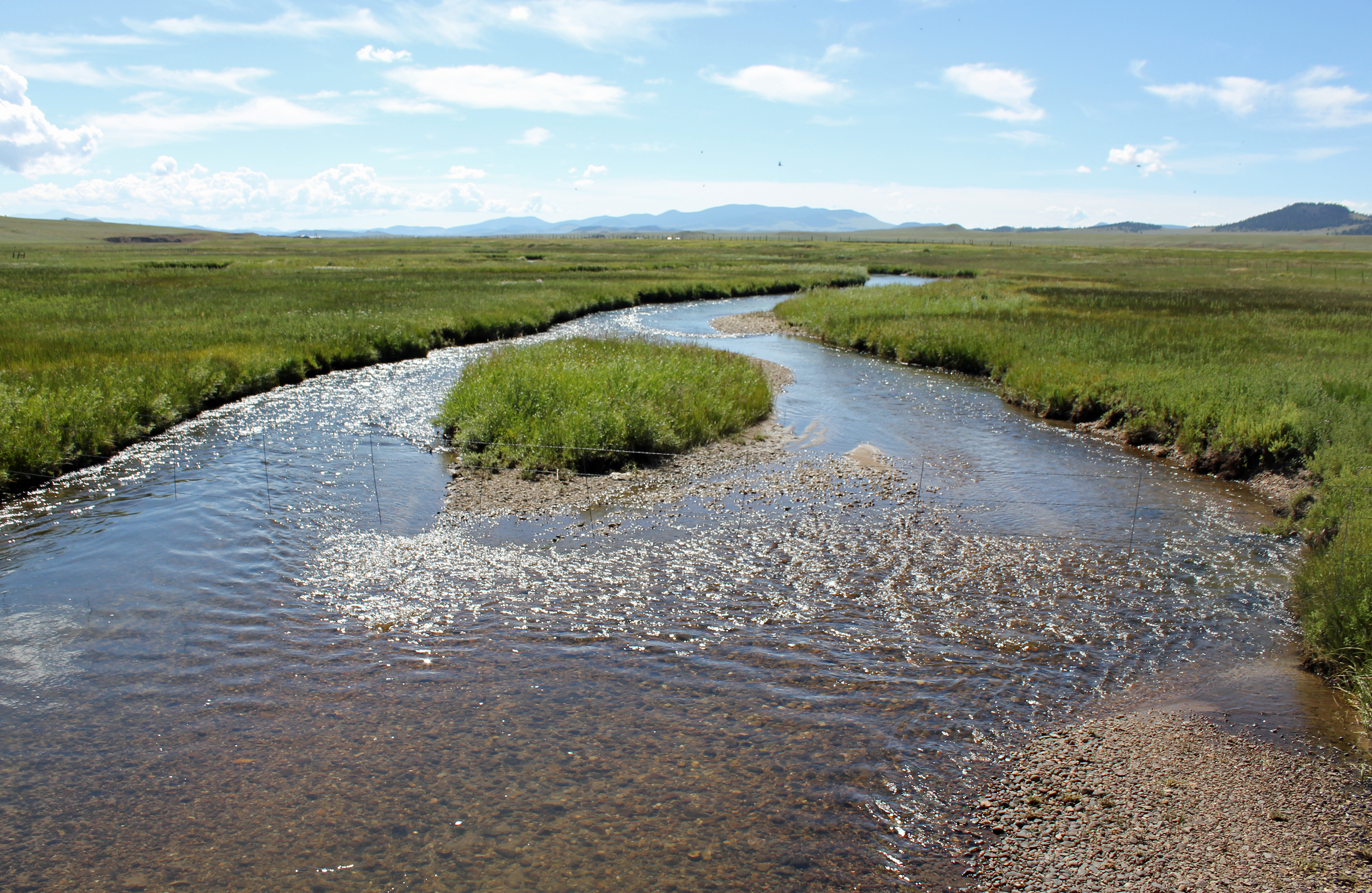
- The river just after it passes under Highway 24 near Hartsel.

Physical characteristics
- Source
  - location: Park County, Colorado
  - coordinates: 39°22′16″N 106°07′40″W
- Mouth
  - location: Confluence with South Fork South Platte River
  - coordinates: 39°00′40″N 105°44′25″W
  - elevation: 8,776 ft (2,675 m)

Basin features
- Progression: South Platte—Platte— Missouri—Mississippi

The Middle Fork South Platte River is a tributary of the South Platte River, approximately 50 miles (80 km) long, located in central Colorado in the United States. The river provides part of the drainage of South Park, the intermontane grassland basin located between the Front Range and the Mosquito Range in the Rocky Mountains southwest of Denver.

The river rises in northwestern Park County, at the continental divide along the north side of Mount Lincoln, just west of Hoosier Pass. It descends to the southeast in a narrow valley along State Highway 9 past Alma, emerging into the northwest end of South Park at Fairplay, which sits on a bluff on the east side of the river. It crosses South Park towards the southeast, between the watersheds of Tarryall Creek to the north and the South Fork South Platte River to the south, running along the western side of Red Hill, receiving several smaller creeks. It joins the South Fork from the north to the South Platte main branch just east of Hartsel, approximately two miles (3.2 km) east of the junction of State Highway 9 and U.S. Highway 24.

The river was a significant source of placer gold during the Colorado Gold Rush of 1859, leading to the first large influx of white settlers into South Platte, previously inhabited principally by the Ute people. The river bed near Fairplay continued to be a productive gold source for many decades and was the location of mining and milling operations up through the middle 20th century.

== See also ==
- List of rivers of Colorado
