= South Fork South Platte River =

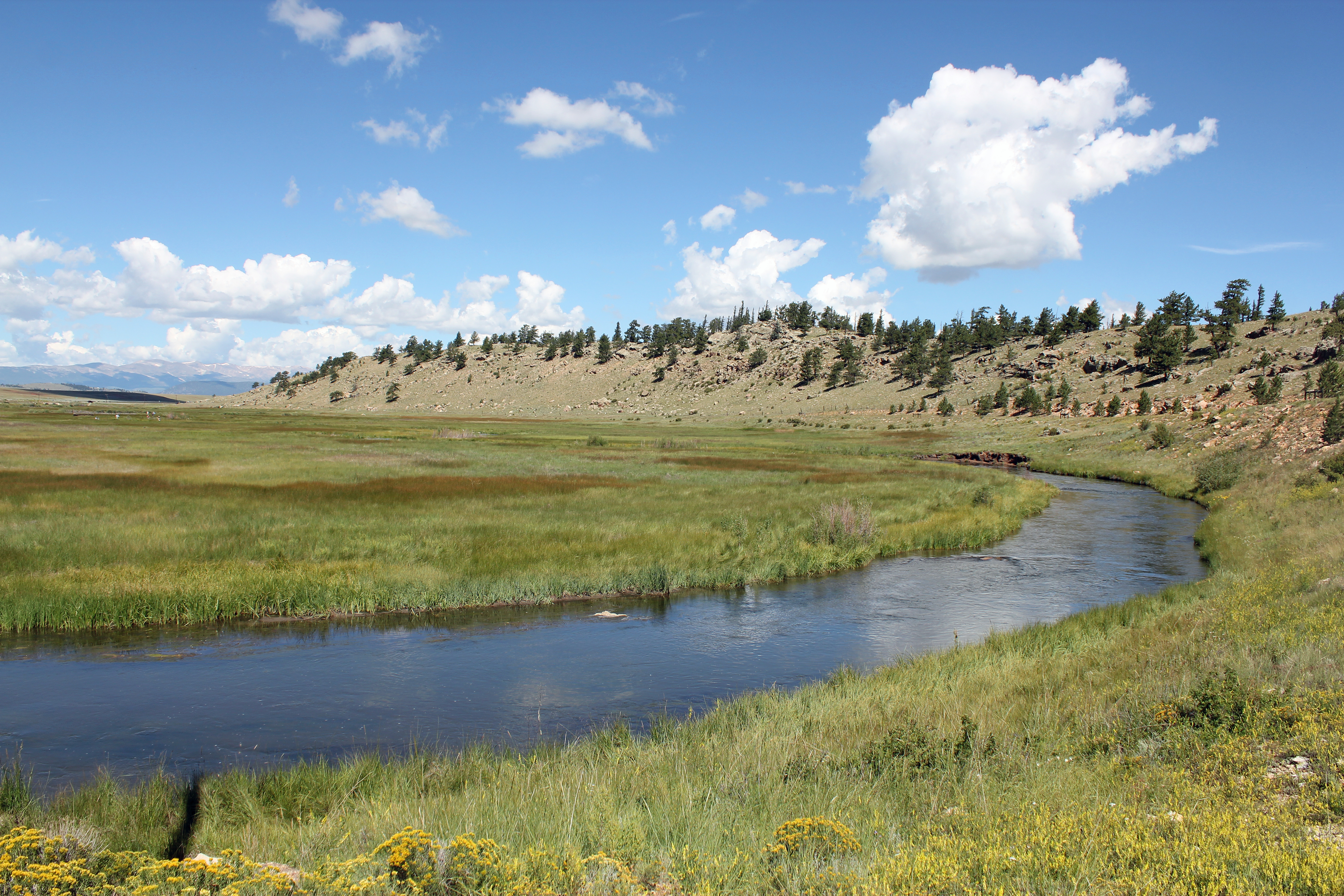
- The river near Hartsel, Colorado.

Physical characteristics
- Source
  - location: Park County, Colorado
  - coordinates: 39°07′42″N 106°10′39″W
- Mouth
  - location: Confluence with Middle Fork South Platte River
  - coordinates: 39°00′40″N 105°44′25″W
  - elevation: 8,776 ft (2,675 m)

Basin features
- Progression: South Platte—Platte— Missouri—Mississippi

The South Fork South Platte River is a tributary of the South Platte River, approximately 45 miles (72 km) long, in central Colorado in the United States. It is located near the headwaters of the South Platte in Park County, Colorado and drains part of the intermontane grassland basin of South Park. It forms the South Platte by its confluence with the Middle Fork South Platte River in southern South Park.

It rises on the eastern flank of the Mosquito Range, below Weston Pass north of Buffalo Peaks in the Pike National Forest. It descends through a short narrow gorge to the southeast, then turns east to emerge into the eastern side of South Park approximately 10 miles (16 km) south of the town of Fairplay. It turns south, skirting the base of the mountains and flowing along the eastern side of U.S. Highway 285, then turns east, winding in a course that roughly follows U.S. Highway 24. It joins the Middle Fork to form the main branch of the South Platte near the community of Hartsel.

== See also ==
- List of rivers of Colorado
