= Mount Lincoln (Colorado) =

Mountain in Colorado, United States

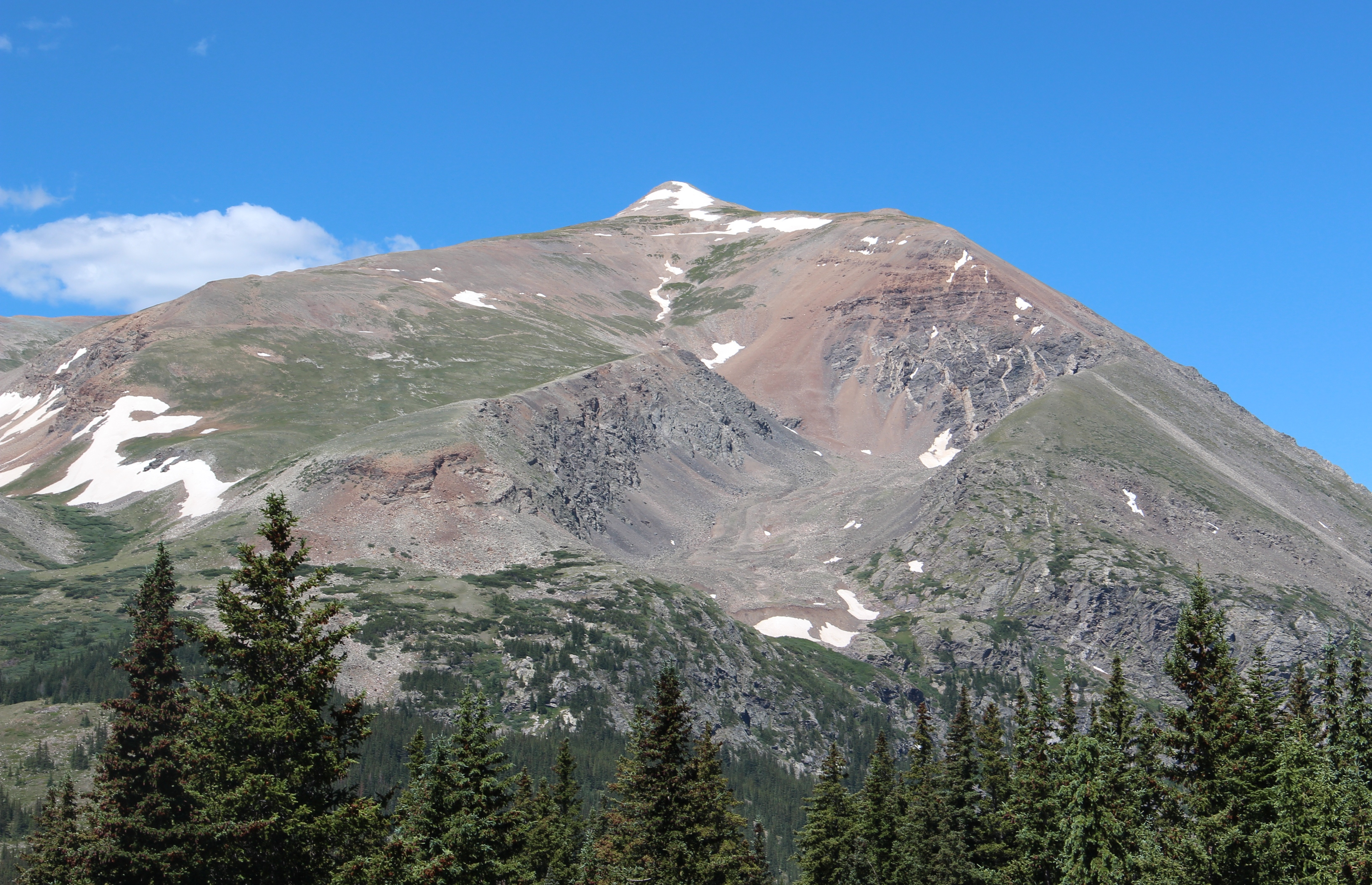
- View of Mt Lincoln from Colorado State Highway 9

Highest point
- Elevation: 14,290.6 ft (4,355.8 m); NAPGD2022
- Prominence: 3862 ft (1177 m)
- Isolation: 22.5 mi (36.2 km)
- Listing: North America highest peaks 37th; US highest major peaks 23rd; Colorado highest major peaks 8th; Colorado fourteeners 8th; Colorado county high points 8th
- Coordinates: 39°21′05″N 106°06′42″W

Naming
- Etymology: Abraham Lincoln

Geography
- Location within Colorado
- Location: High point of Park County, Colorado, United States
- Parent range: Highest summit of the Mosquito Range
- Topo map(s): USGS 7.5' topographic map Alma, Colorado

Climbing
- Easiest route: West Ridge: Hike, class 2

Mount Lincoln is the eighth-highest summit of the Rocky Mountains of North America and the U.S. state of Colorado. The prominent 14,291-foot (4355.79 m) fourteener is the highest summit of the Mosquito Range and the eleventh-highest summit in the contiguous United States. Mount Lincoln is located in Pike National Forest, 5.2 miles (8.3 km) north-northwest (bearing 332°) of the Town of Alma in Park County, Colorado, United States. The summit of Mount Lincoln is the highest point in Park County and the entire drainage basin of the Missouri River. The mountain was named in honor of Abraham Lincoln, 16th President of the United States.

== Climbing ==
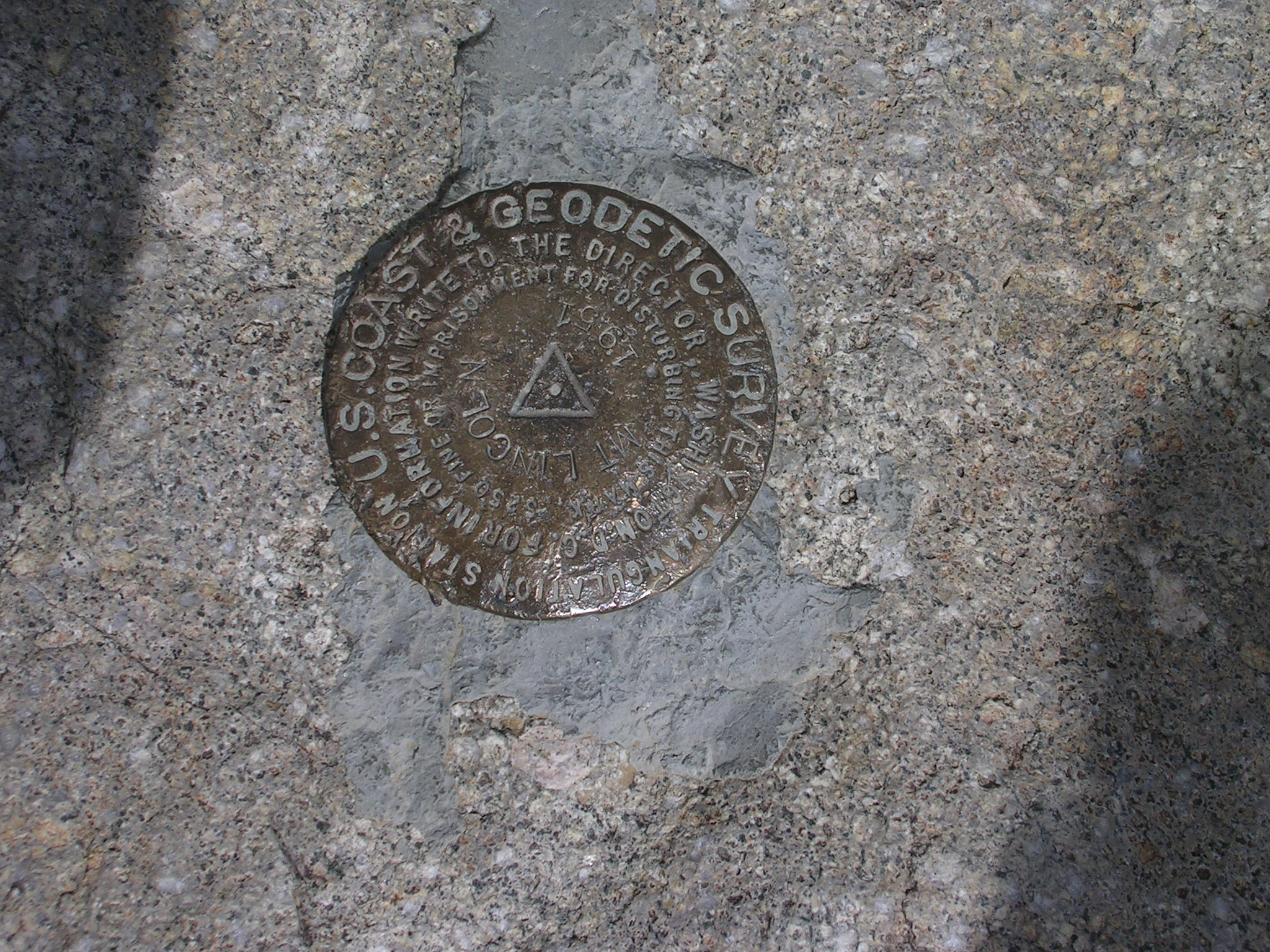
USGS Marker at the summit of Mount Lincoln.

Mount Lincoln is typically climbed from the Kite Lake Trailhead, at the end of Park County Road 8. Many climbers attempt to combine the summit of Mount Lincoln with those of Mount Bross and Mount Democrat in one climb. Most routes to the summit are rated class 2.

== Access issues ==
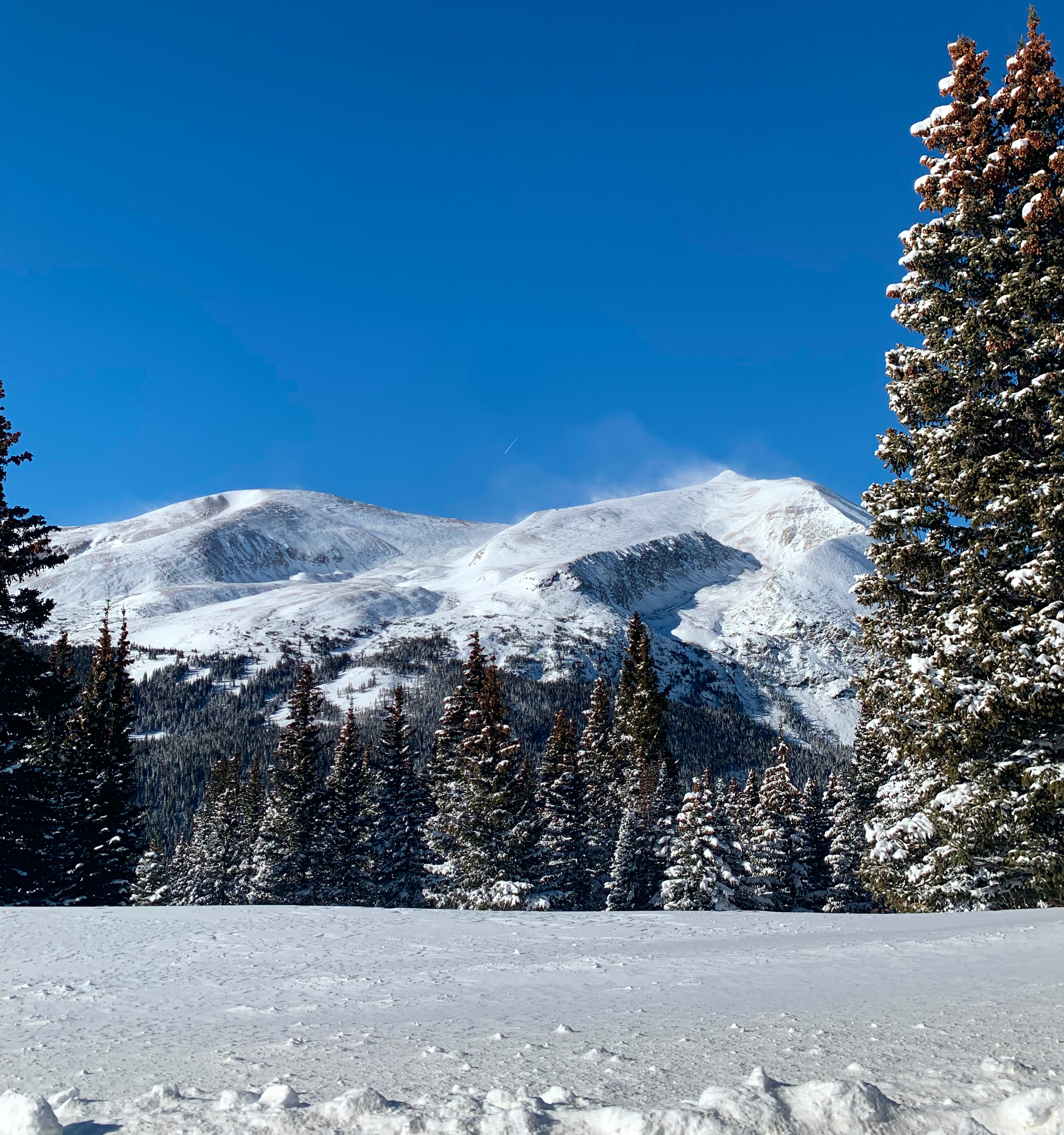
Mount Bross (left) and Mount Lincoln (right) as viewed from Colorado State Highway 9 in winter

Silver was discovered here in 1874.

Mount Lincoln, along with its neighbors Cameron, Democrat and Bross, is pockmarked with old mines, and much of the land is owned privately by mining companies; a large mine still operates in nearby Climax. In the summer of 2005, these landowners denied access to the peaks by hikers and climbers, fearing liability in the case of injury, and citing the particular dangers due to the presence of old mine workings. On August 1, 2006, the town of Alma signed a deal to lease the peaks for a nominal fee, to reduce the potential liability to the owners and free up the peaks for recreational access. The opening of these peaks excludes the summit of Mount Bross since not all of the landowners have given permission for access to the area.

== Climate ==
Climate data for Mount Lincoln 39.3494 N, 106.1170 W, Elevation: 13,832 ft (4,216 m) (1991–2020 normals)
Month	Jan	Feb	Mar	Apr	May	Jun	Jul	Aug	Sep	Oct	Nov	Dec	Year
Mean daily maximum °F (°C)	19.1 (−7.2)	18.1 (−7.7)	24.2 (−4.3)	31.3 (−0.4)	39.7 (4.3)	50.5 (10.3)	56.6 (13.7)	54.2 (12.3)	48.2 (9.0)	37.1 (2.8)	25.6 (−3.6)	19.3 (−7.1)	35.3 (1.8)
Daily mean °F (°C)	8.3 (−13.2)	7.3 (−13.7)	12.5 (−10.8)	18.6 (−7.4)	27.5 (−2.5)	37.3 (2.9)	43.6 (6.4)	41.9 (5.5)	35.5 (1.9)	25.3 (−3.7)	15.3 (−9.3)	8.8 (−12.9)	23.5 (−4.7)
Mean daily minimum °F (°C)	−2.5 (−19.2)	−3.4 (−19.7)	0.8 (−17.3)	5.9 (−14.5)	15.2 (−9.3)	24.0 (−4.4)	30.6 (−0.8)	29.7 (−1.3)	22.8 (−5.1)	13.6 (−10.2)	5.0 (−15.0)	−1.8 (−18.8)	11.7 (−11.3)
Average precipitation inches (mm)	2.73 (69)	3.18 (81)	3.50 (89)	4.38 (111)	3.30 (84)	1.13 (29)	2.38 (60)	2.76 (70)	1.77 (45)	2.57 (65)	3.13 (80)	2.86 (73)	33.69 (856)
Source: PRISM Climate Group

== See also ==
- List of mountain peaks of North America
  - List of mountain peaks of the United States
    - List of mountain peaks of Colorado
      - List of Colorado county high points
      - List of Colorado fourteeners
