= Alma, Colorado =

Statutory Town in Park County, Colorado, United States

- Statutory town
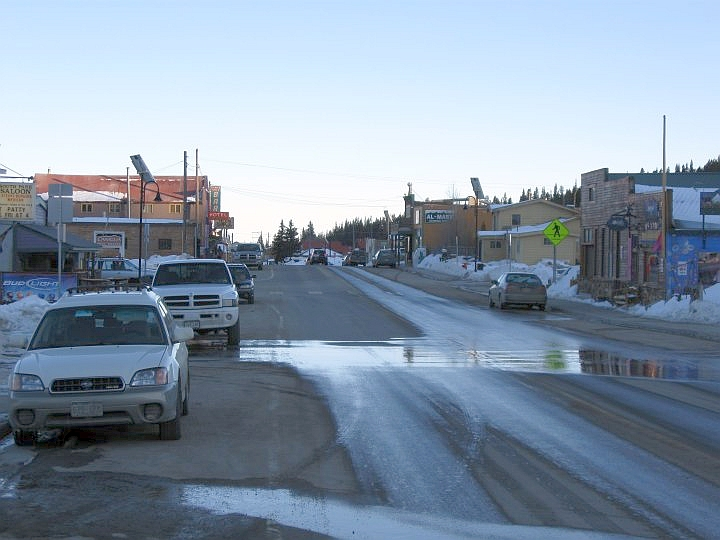
- Main Street in Alma (2010)

- Location of the Town of Alma in Park County, Colorado
- Coordinates: 39°17′09″N 106°04′01″W
- Country: United States
- State: Colorado
- County: Park
- Incorporated: December 2, 1873
- Named after: Alma James

Government
  - Type: statutory town

Area
  - Total: 0.436 sq mi (1.13 km^{2})
  - Land: 0.434 sq mi (1.12 km^{2})
  - Water: 0.002 sq mi (0.0052 km^{2})
- Elevation: 10,361 ft (3,158 m)

Population (2020)
  - Total: 296
  - Density: 682/sq mi (263/km^{2})
- Time zone: UTC−07:00 (MST)
  - Summer (DST): UTC−06:00 (MDT)
- ZIP code: 80420
- Area code: 719
- GNIS town ID: 2412350
- FIPS code: 08-01530
- Website: Town of Alma

Alma is a statutory town in Park County, Colorado, United States. The town population was 296 at the 2020 United States census. Alma is a part of the Denver-Aurora-Centennial, CO Metropolitan Statistical Area and the Front Range Urban Corridor.

== Description ==
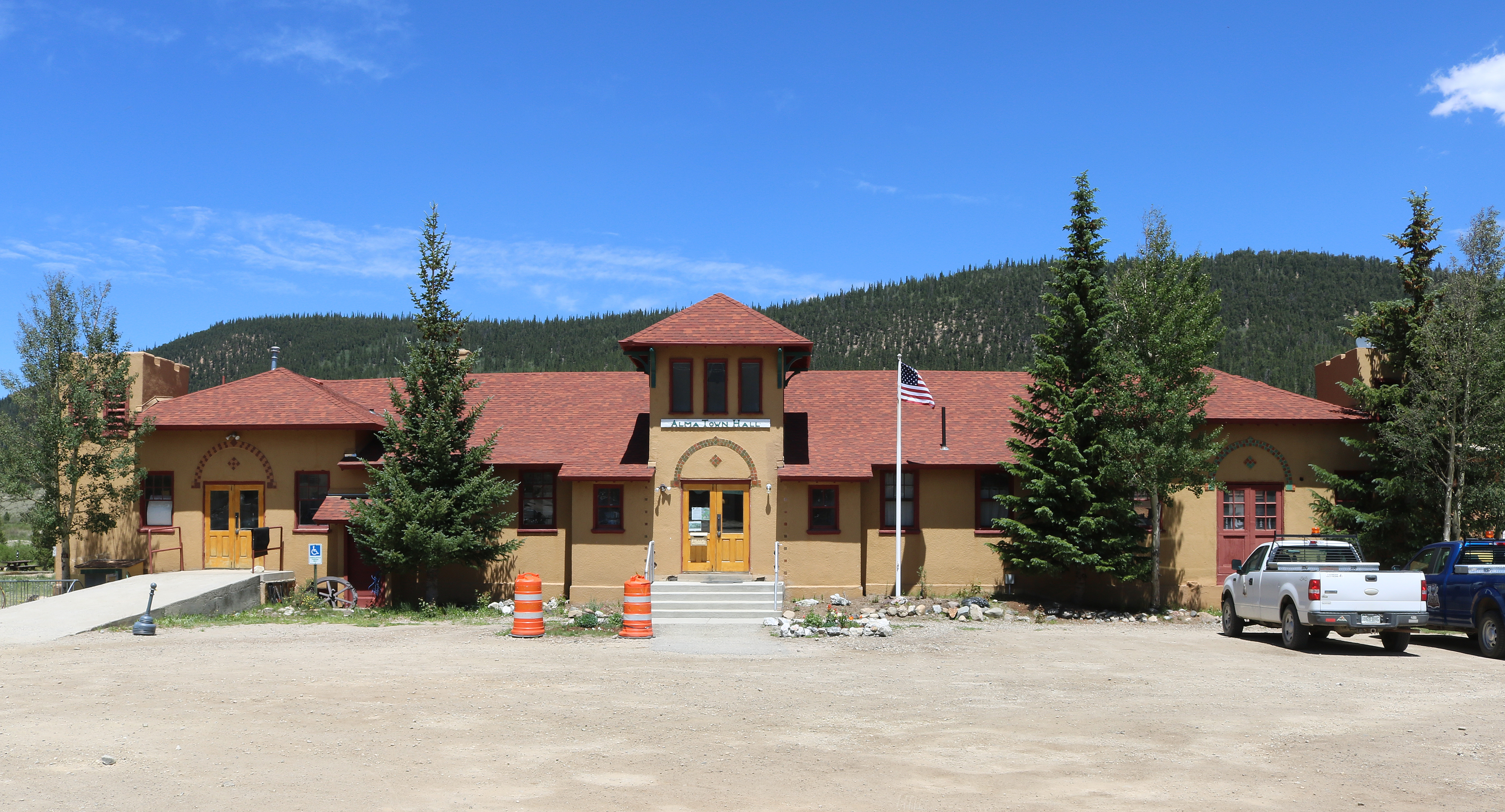
Alma Town Hall, July 2020

At an elevation of 10,361 feet (3,158 m), Alma is the highest incorporated municipality in the United States when considering only areas with permanent residents. Its post office is located at the highest elevation of any in the country. Alma, which is considered a town and not a city, does not take the title of "highest incorporated city" from Leadville, Colorado. Using administrative boundaries as a measure, not settled areas, in 2006 Winter Park, Colorado became the highest incorporated town due to its annexation of a ski area. Beyond the official limits of Alma is a residential area which extends to 11,680 feet (3,560 m) above sea level on Mountain View Drive; this area uses Fairplay, Colorado addresses, despite being slightly closer to Alma.

== History ==
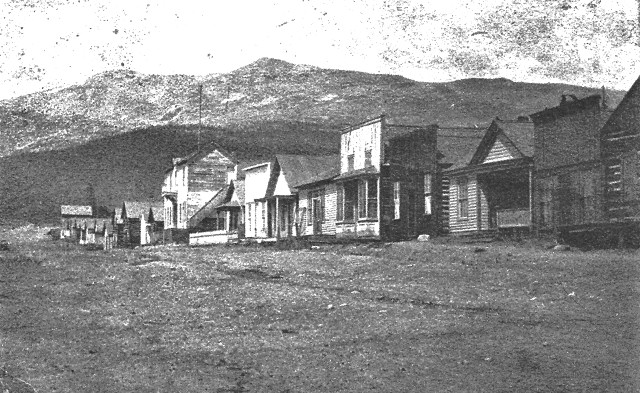
Alma in the 1870s

The town was named by a merchant named Mr. James, after his wife. Another tradition states the town was named for the daughter of a resident.

The Alma, Colorado Territory, post office opened on March 7, 1873, and the Town of Alma was incorporated on December 2, 1873. Colorado became a state on August 1, 1876.

In February 1998, local resident Thomas Leask murdered a former mayor and damaged town buildings, costing the town at least US$100,000 (equivalent to about $198,000 in 2025), a prohibitive amount for Alma's municipal finances.

=== Mines ===
Alma grew as a town around the Buckskin Gulch, where gold was first discovered in the area. As hard rock mines opened on Mount Bross, Mount Lincoln, and Mount Democrat, the population of the area continued to grow. In the 1870s, Alma's population peaked at around 10,000 people. The area around Alma contains 17,452 mining sites, mostly placer mines.

Approximately two miles from Alma are the remains of the defunct Orphan Boy mine (founded 1861), which produced gold, silver, lead, and zinc over a number of decades.

The historic Sweet Home Mine near Alma, formerly a silver mine, now produces the mineral rhodochrosite.

== Geography ==
Alma is located along State Highway 9.

At the 2020 United States census, the town had a total area of 279 acres (1.129 km^{2}) including 1.5 acres (0.006 km^{2}) of water.

=== Climate ===
Alma has what could be called a subalpine climate due to its elevation. Summers are pleasant, with mild days and chilly nights. The wettest months are July and August due to thunderstorm activity. Spring and Autumn are both short, but pleasant overall with cool days and cold nights occasionally reaching below freezing. Winters are cold and snowy, lasting from the end of October to well into April some years. Winter highs are almost always below freezing and lows remaining around zero for 1/3 of the year. Alma's snowpack is usually established during October or November. Alma's high elevation and location helps to limit both extreme minima and maxima. April averages the most snowfall out of any month of the year.

Climate data for Alma
Month	Jan	Feb	Mar	Apr	May	Jun	Jul	Aug	Sep	Oct	Nov	Dec	Year
Record high °F (°C)	57 (14)	57 (14)	64 (18)	66 (19)	80 (27)	86 (30)	84 (29)	83 (28)	82 (28)	72 (22)	66 (19)	56 (13)	86 (30)
Mean daily maximum °F (°C)	27.9 (−2.3)	30.4 (−0.9)	33.6 (0.9)	41.2 (5.1)	51.3 (10.7)	62.2 (16.8)	68.2 (20.1)	65.7 (18.7)	59.0 (15.0)	49.1 (9.5)	35.8 (2.1)	28.6 (−1.9)	46.1 (7.8)
Daily mean °F (°C)	14.2 (−9.9)	15.8 (−9.0)	19.9 (−6.7)	28.2 (−2.1)	38.3 (3.5)	47.8 (8.8)	53.6 (12.0)	51.6 (10.9)	45.0 (7.2)	35.6 (2.0)	23.2 (−4.9)	15.6 (−9.1)	32.4 (0.2)
Mean daily minimum °F (°C)	0.5 (−17.5)	1.4 (−17.0)	6.3 (−14.3)	15.4 (−9.2)	25.5 (−3.6)	33.4 (0.8)	39.2 (4.0)	37.8 (3.2)	30.9 (−0.6)	22.3 (−5.4)	10.8 (−11.8)	2.8 (−16.2)	18.9 (−7.3)
Record low °F (°C)	−35 (−37)	−38 (−39)	−30 (−34)	−17 (−27)	3 (−16)	18 (−8)	21 (−6)	23 (−5)	8 (−13)	−8 (−22)	−24 (−31)	−31 (−35)	−38 (−39)
Average precipitation inches (mm)	1.46 (37)	1.30 (33)	1.73 (44)	1.77 (45)	1.65 (42)	1.46 (37)	2.40 (61)	2.40 (61)	1.58 (40)	1.26 (32)	1.42 (36)	1.58 (40)	20.01 (508)
Average snowfall inches (cm)	17.0 (43)	19.8 (50)	22.0 (56)	23.1 (59)	9.2 (23)	1.3 (3.3)	0.1 (0.25)	0 (0)	2.0 (5.1)	10.9 (28)	21.5 (55)	19.0 (48)	145.9 (370.65)
Average snowy days	9.5	8.7	10.4	9.2	4	0.6	0	0	0.9	3.9	8.4	8.9	64.5

== Demographics ==
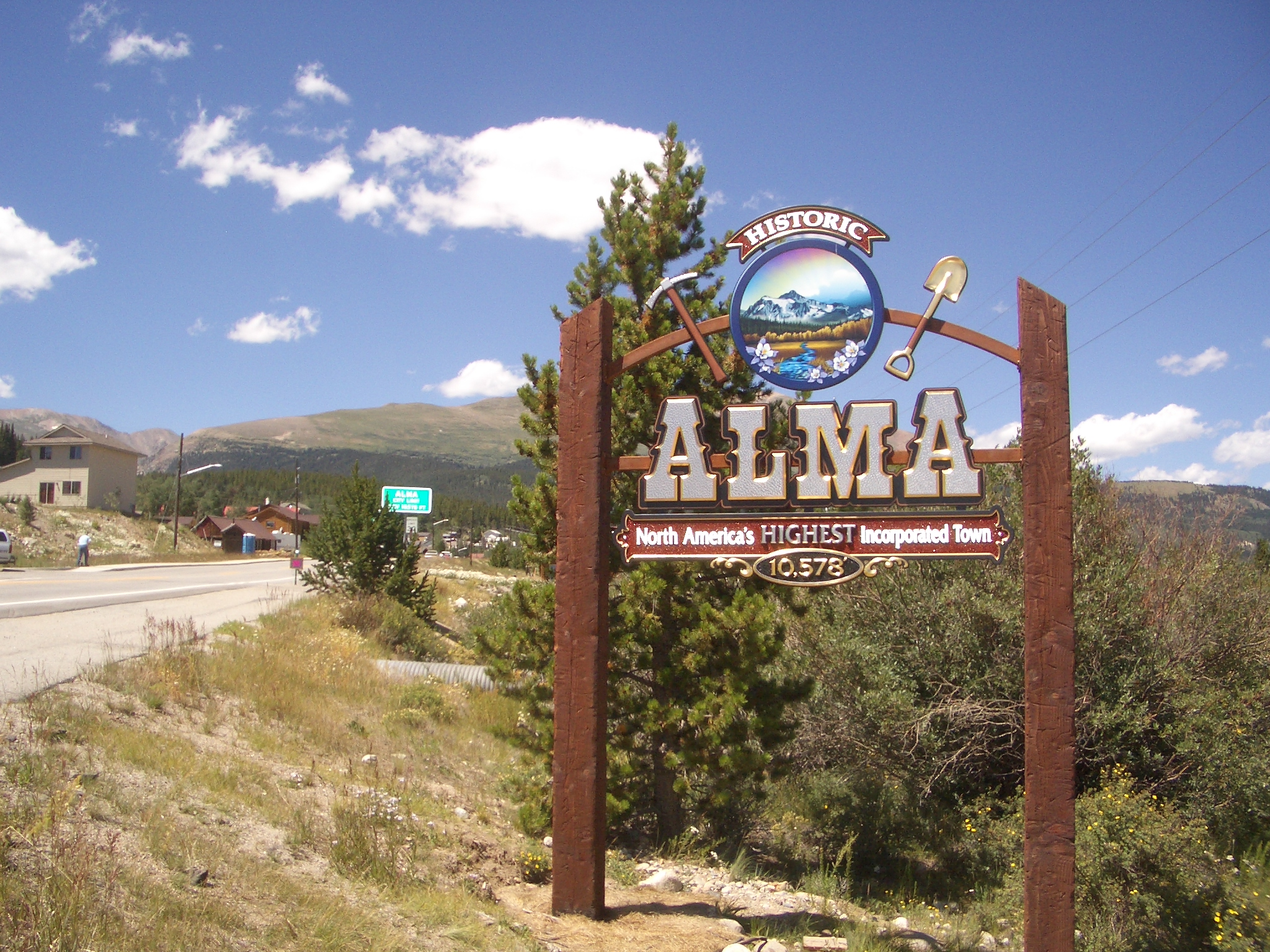
Alma welcome sign, 2003

Historical population
Census	Pop.	Note	%±
1880	446		—
1890	367		−17.7%
1900	297		−19.1%
1910	301		1.3%
1920	127		−57.8%
1930	110		−13.4%
1940	469		326.4%
1950	149		−68.2%
1960	107		−28.2%
1970	73		−31.8%
1980	132		80.8%
1990	148		12.1%
2000	179		20.9%
2010	270		50.8%
2020	296		9.6%
U.S. Decennial Census

As of the census of 2000, there were 179 people, 94 households, and 40 families residing in the town. The population density was 523.6 inhabitants per square mile (202.2/km^{2}). There were 147 housing units at an average density of 430.0 per square mile (166.0/km^{2}). The racial makeup of the town was 92.74% White, 2.23% Native American, 0.56% Asian, 3.35% from other races, and 1.12% from two or more races. Hispanics or Latinos of any race were 3.35% of the population.

There were 94 households, of which 18.1% had children under the age of 18 living with them, 37.2% were married couples living together, 2.1% had a female householder with no husband present, and 57.4% were non-families. 39.4% of all households were made up of individuals, and 1.1% had someone living alone who was 65 years of age or older. The average household size was 1.90 and the average family size was 2.63.

The age distribution was 12.8% under the age of 18, 5.6% from 18 to 24, 53.1% from 25 to 44, 24.0% from 45 to 64, and 4.5% who were 65 years of age or older. The median age was 37 years. For every 100 females, there were 132.5 males. For every 100 females age 18 and over, there were 140.0 males.

The median income for a household in the town was $41,563, and the median income for a family was $59,688. Males had a median income of $28,750 versus $26,563 for females. The per capita income for the town was $25,165. None of the families and 4.3% of the population were living below the poverty line.

== See also ==
- Front Range Urban Corridor
