= Colorado State Highway 9 =

Highway in Colorado

State Highway 9
- SH 9 highlighted in red

Route information
- Maintained by CDOT
- Length: 138.92 mi (223.57 km)
- Tourist routes: Gold Belt Byway, Colorado River Headwaters Byway

Major junctions
- South end: US 50 near Cañon City
- US 24 in Hartsel; US 285 in Fairplay; I-70 in Frisco and Silverthorne
- North end: US 40 in Kremmling

Location
- Country: United States
- State: Colorado
- Counties: Fremont, Park, Summit, Grand

Highway system
- Colorado State Highway System; Interstate; US; State; Scenic
← SH 8	→ SH 10

State Highway 9 (SH 9) in the U.S. state of Colorado is a 138-mile-long (222 km) state highway through central Colorado. SH 9's southern terminus is at U.S. Route 50 (US 50) near Cañon City, and the northern terminus is at US 40 in Kremmling. SH 9 is part of the Gold Belt Byway from US 50 to High Park Road and the Colorado River Headwaters National Scenic Byway from US 40 to Trough Road.

== Route description ==
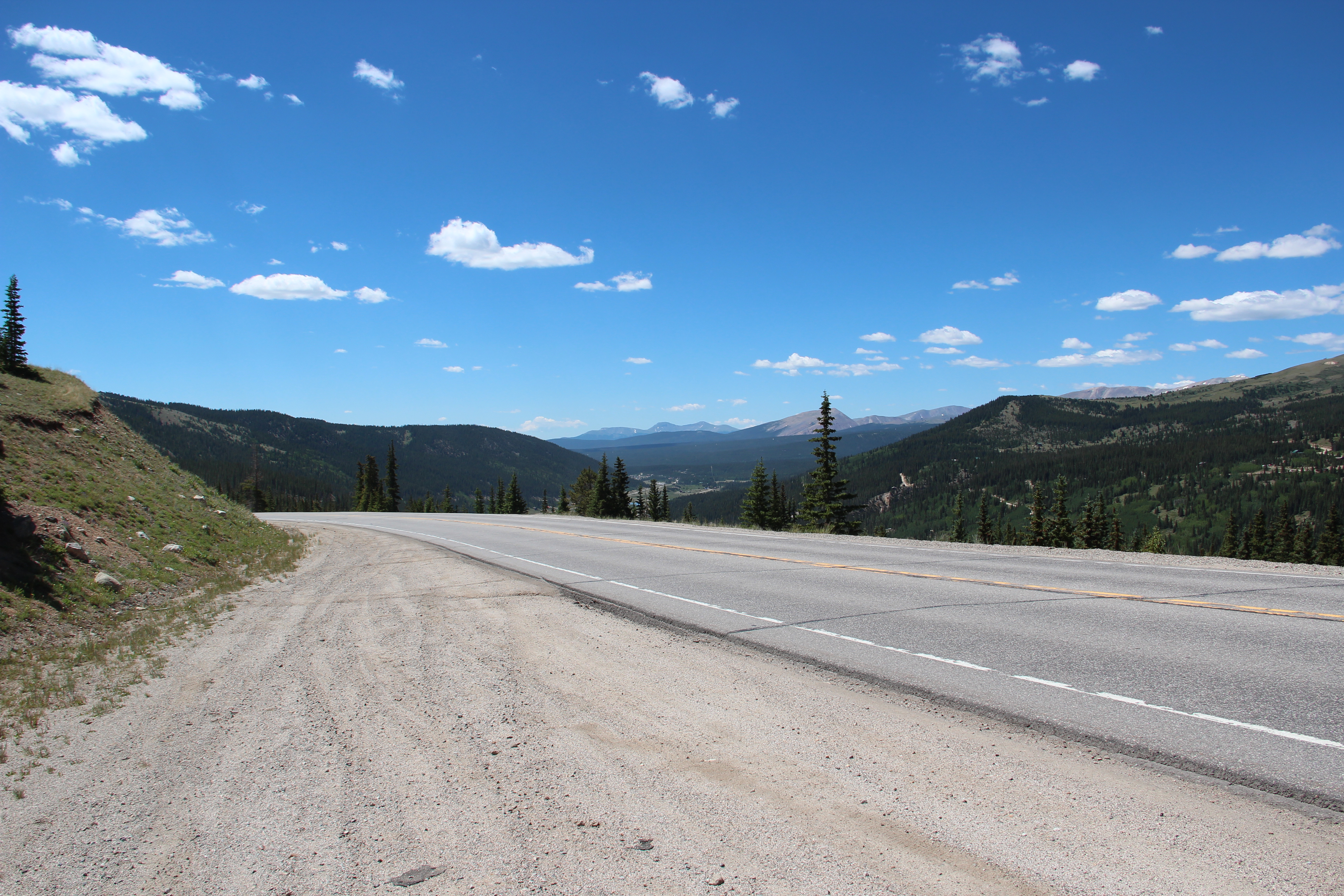
SH 9 near Hoosier Pass

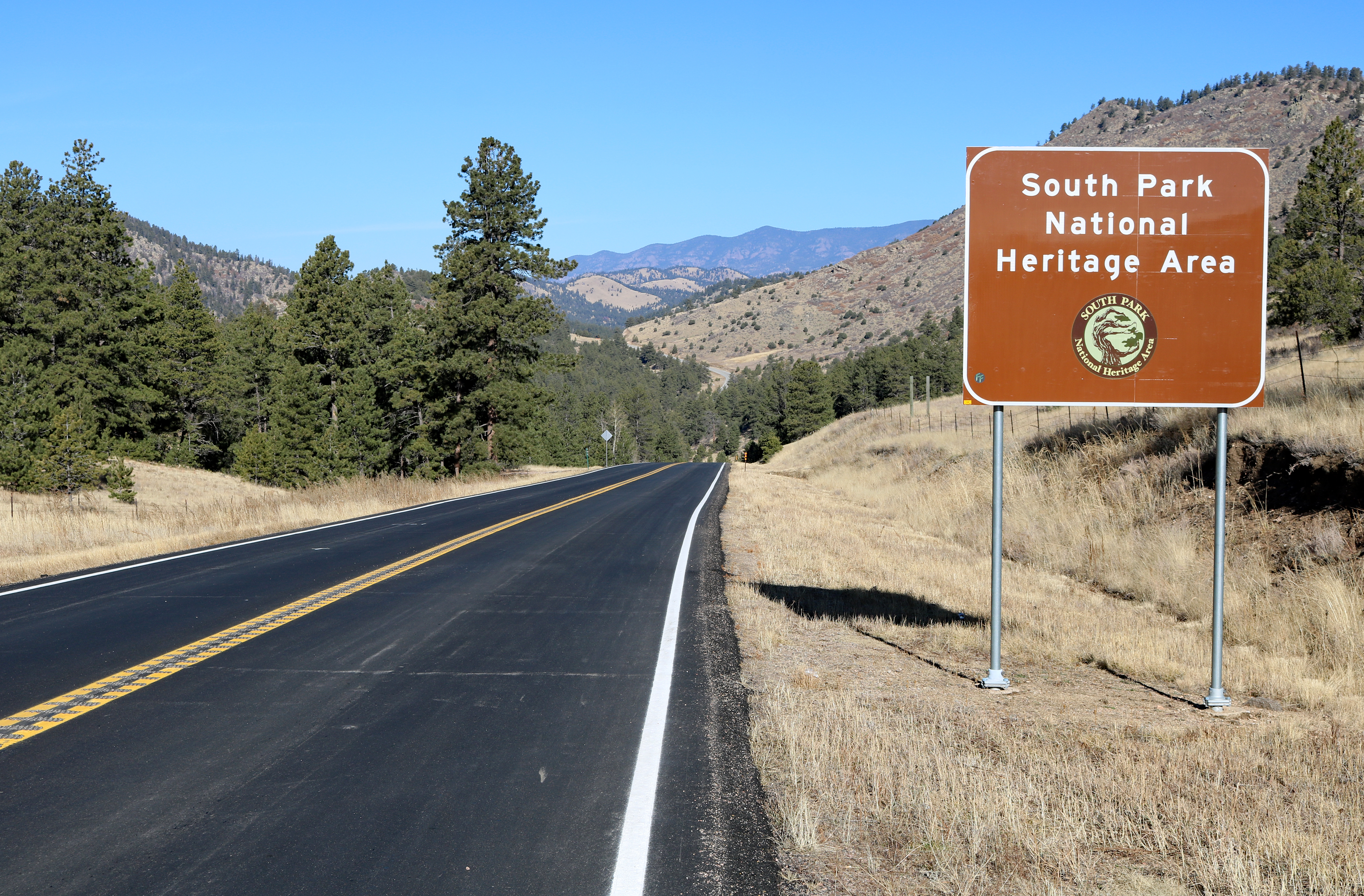
SH 9 as it enters the South Park National Heritage Area

State Highway 9 starts at a junction with US 50 west of Cañon City. It heads northwest, following Currant Creek most of the way to Currant Creek Pass where it enters an open area known as South Park. The south fork of the South Platte is crossed as the highway enters Hartsel and a junction with US 24. SH 9 follows US 24 west for 0.5 mi (0.80 km), then splits off to head northwest again. Just south of Fairplay, it joins northbound US 285. At Fairplay SH 9 leaves US 285 to head northwest, following the middle fork of the South Platte most of the way to Hoosier Pass where it crosses the Continental Divide 11,532 ft (3,515 m) above sea level. Switchbacks drop the highway to the Blue River which it follows north through Breckenridge to Dillon Reservoir. The highway goes around the west side of the reservoir, through Frisco and joins I 70 as it heads northeast. At Silverthorne, SH 9 leaves I 70 to continue northwest alongside the Blue River. SH 9 crosses the Colorado River just before its termination at a junction with US 40 in Kremmling.

=== Wildlife crossing project ===
In 2016, the state completed a wildlife crossing project to reduce wildlife-vehicle collisions between Green Mountain Reservoir and Kremmling, including 2 wildlife overpasses and 5 underpasses; the state also widened the road and shoulders.

== Major intersections ==
County	Location	mi	km	Destinations	Notes
Fremont		0.000	0.000	US 50 – Cañon City, Salida	Southern terminus
Park	Hartsel	46.980	75.607	US 24 east – Colorado Springs	South end of US 24 overlap
Park		47.582	76.576	US 24 west – Buena Vista	North end of US 24 overlap
Park		63.732	102.567	US 285 south – Buena Vista	South end of US 285 overlap
Park	Fairplay	64.673	104.081	US 285 north – Denver	North end of US 285 overlap
Summit	Frisco	96.998	156.103	I-70 west	South end of I-70 overlap; I-70 exit 203
Summit	Silverthorne	101.562	163.448	I-70 east	North end of I-70 overlap; I-70 exit 205
Grand	Kremmling	138.920	223.570	US 40 – Steamboat Springs, Hot Sulphur Springs	Northern terminus
Grand	Kremmling	136.608	219.849	CR 1 (Trough Road)	Cutoff route from SH 9 to SH 131
1.000 mi = 1.609 km; 1.000 km = 0.621 mi: Concurrency terminus
