= Guanella Pass Scenic Byway =

Colorado Scenic and Historic Byway

Coordinates: 39.5950°N 105.7111°W

Guanella Pass Scenic Byway

Route information
- Maintained by CDOT
- Length: 22 mi (35 km)
- Existed: 1991–present

Major junctions
- North end: I-70 Exit 232 Georgetown
- South end: US 285 Grant

Location
- Country: United States
- State: Colorado
- Counties: Clear Creek and Park counties

Highway system
- Scenic Byways; National; National Forest; BLM; NPS; Colorado State Highway System; Interstate; US; State; Scenic

The Guanella Pass Scenic Byway is a National Forest Scenic Byway and Colorado Scenic and Historic Byway located in Clear Creek and Park counties, Colorado, USA. The byway traverses Guanella Pass at elevation 11,670 feet (3,557 m) in Arapaho and Pike national forests. The pass lies above timberline surrounded by Grays Peak at elevation 14,278 feet (4,352 m), Torreys Peak 14,275 feet (4,351 m), Mount Blue Sky 14,271 feet (4,350 m), and Mount Bierstadt 14,065 feet (4,287 m). The byway passes through the Georgetown–Silver Plume Historic District, and provides access to the Georgetown Loop Historic Mining & Railroad Park and the Georgetown Loop Railroad. The byway is renowned for its spectacular autumn colors during aspen color change from September 10 through October 10 each year.

== Gallery ==
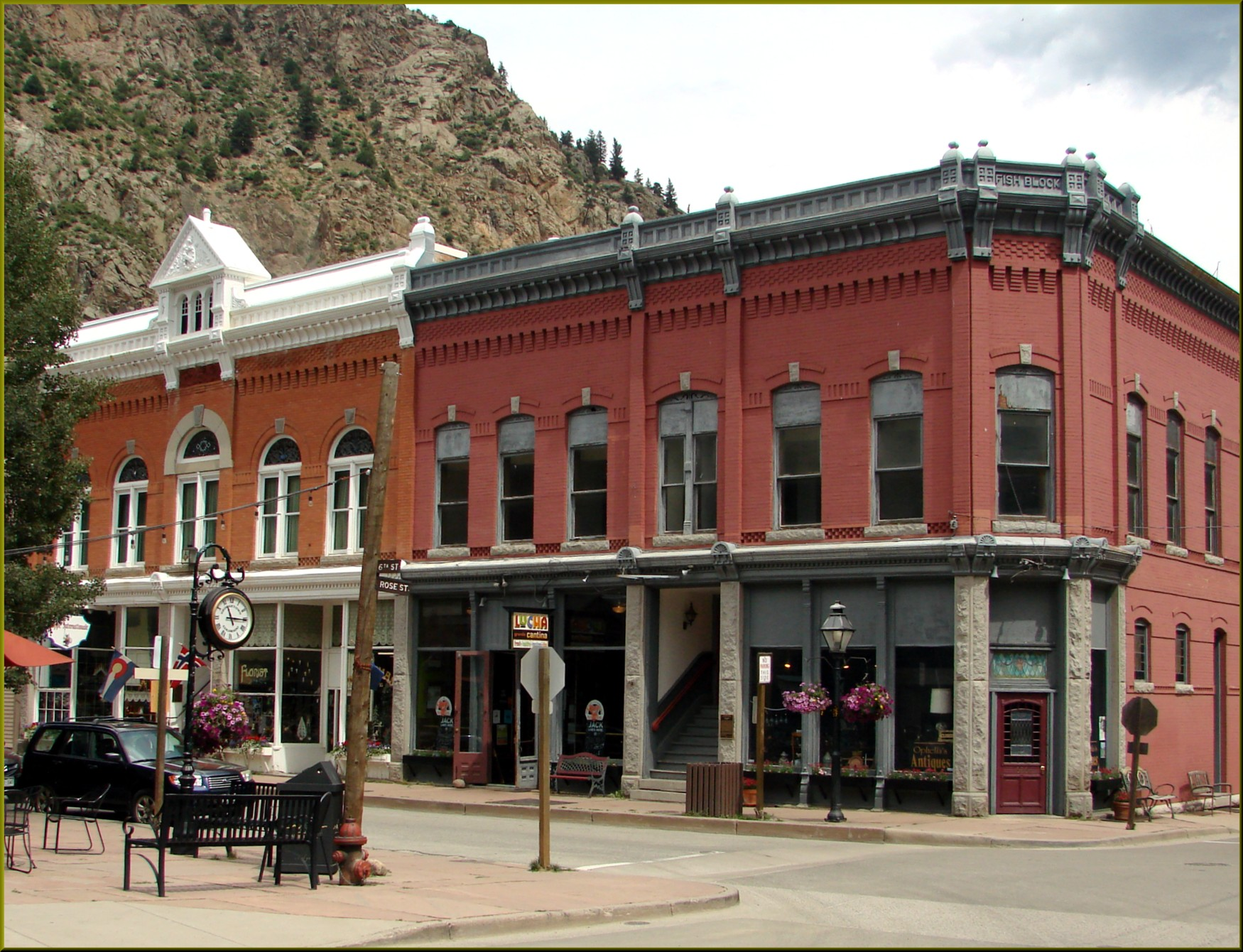
Georgetown, Colorado

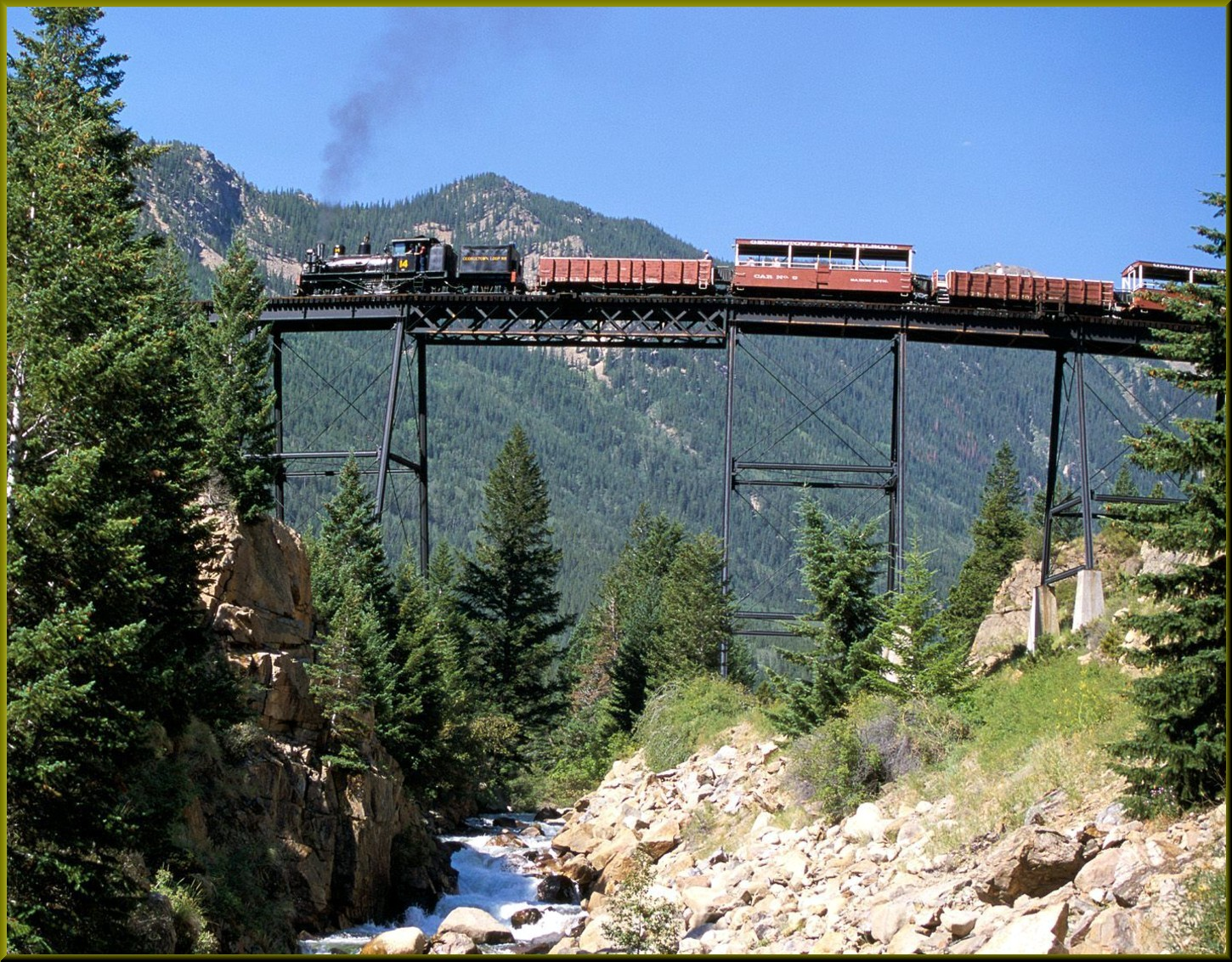
The Georgetown Loop Railroad

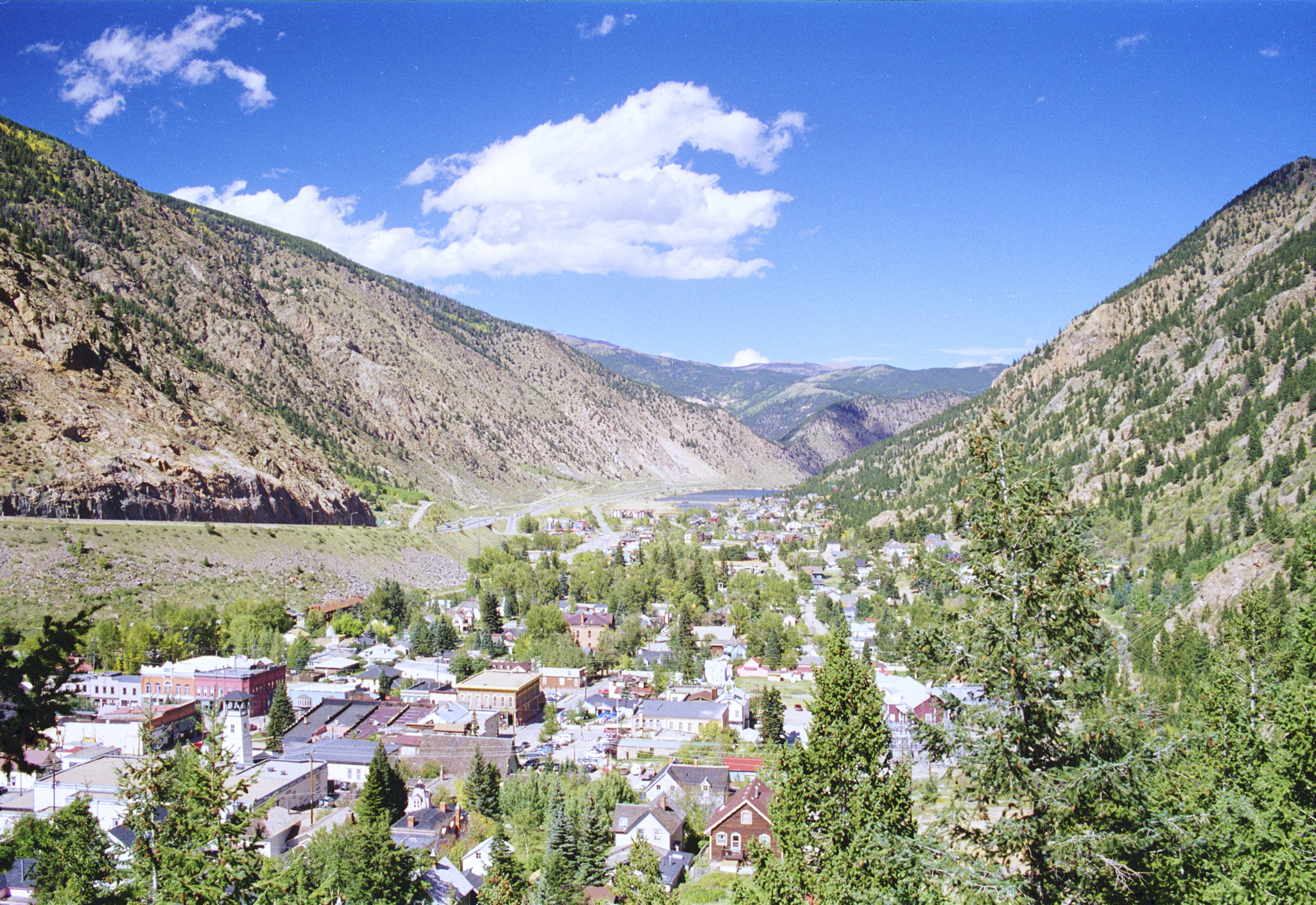
Georgetown from the Guanella Pass Scenic Byway

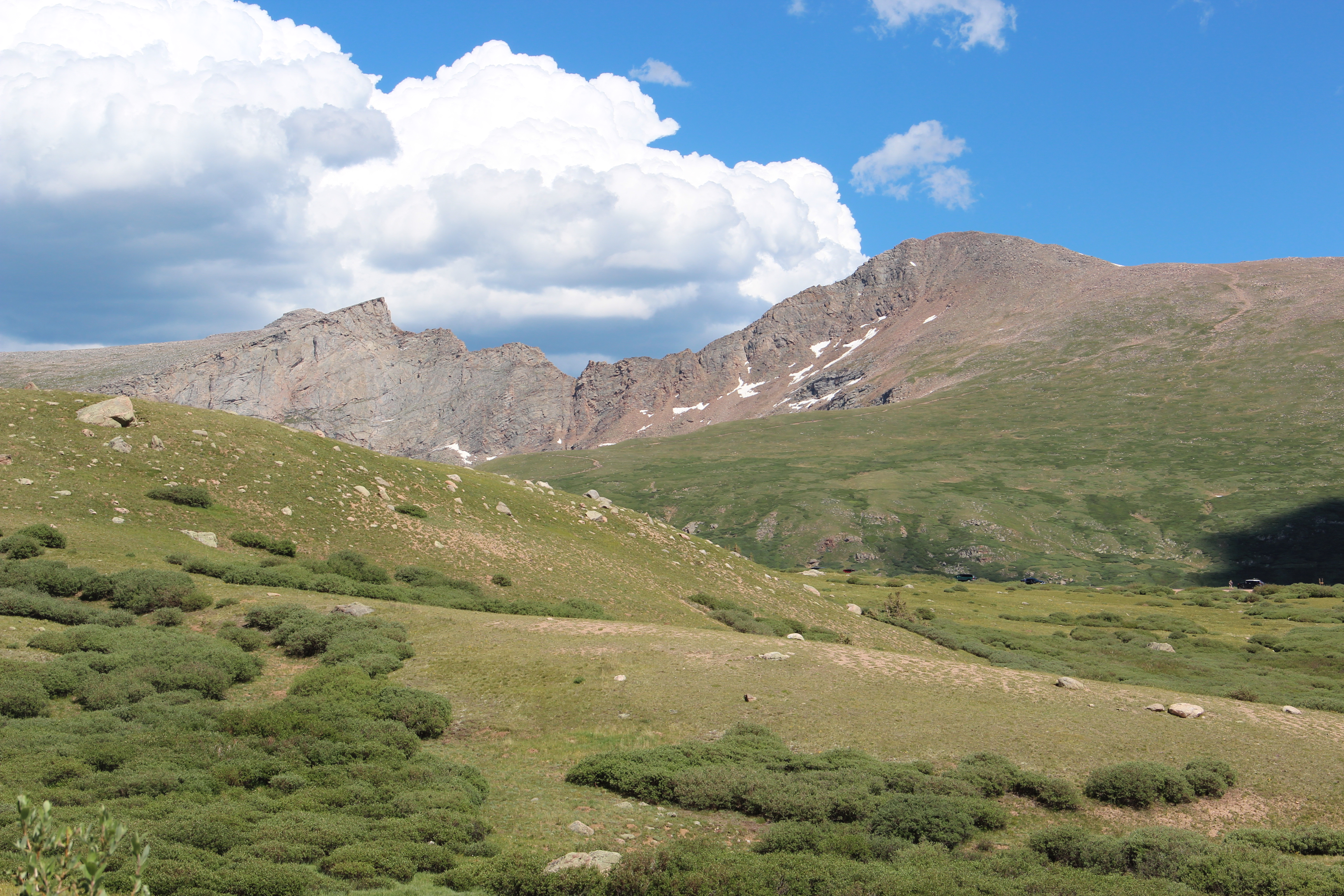
The Sawtooth and Mount Bierstadt from Guanella Pass

== See also ==
- History Colorado
