= The Conservation Campaign =

US non-profit organization

The Conservation Campaign is a United States 501(c)(4) non-profit organization affiliated with The Trust for Public Land (TPL). It is a resource for grassroots campaigns in the US that are concerned with raising funds for land and water conservation.

== Introduction ==
The Conservation Campaign (TCC) mobilizes public support for ballot measures and legislation that create public funds to protect land and water resources. It supports land conservation strategies, from acquisition of urban parks and playgrounds, to the purchase of development rights to protect working forests and farmlands. It is bipartisan and works cooperatively with elected officials, farmers, ranchers, the business community, developers and realtors, and other groups. Many of the campaigns that TCC is involved in receive support from groups like The Nature Conservancy.

== Services ==
TCC services include aid with direct mail, phone banks, public presentations, ballot language, and legal and financial issues. If a campaign is hosted by TCC, the campaign receives financial support and logistical guidance. By working with TPL, citizens can build a campaign that creates funds to preserve open space, wildlife habitat, clean water, and parks.

== Success ==
TCC was founded by TPL in 2000, and since then it has supported 264 measure campaigns, 213 of which were approved. These campaigns worked to, for example, raise funds for buying land for open space in Ann Arbor, Michigan; protecting land against development in Idaho; preserving watershed lands in Georgia; saving old growth forests and coastline in California with "Proposition 4"; and implementing the Community Preservation Act in Massachusetts.
