= Kenosha Pass =

Mountain pass in Colorado, USA

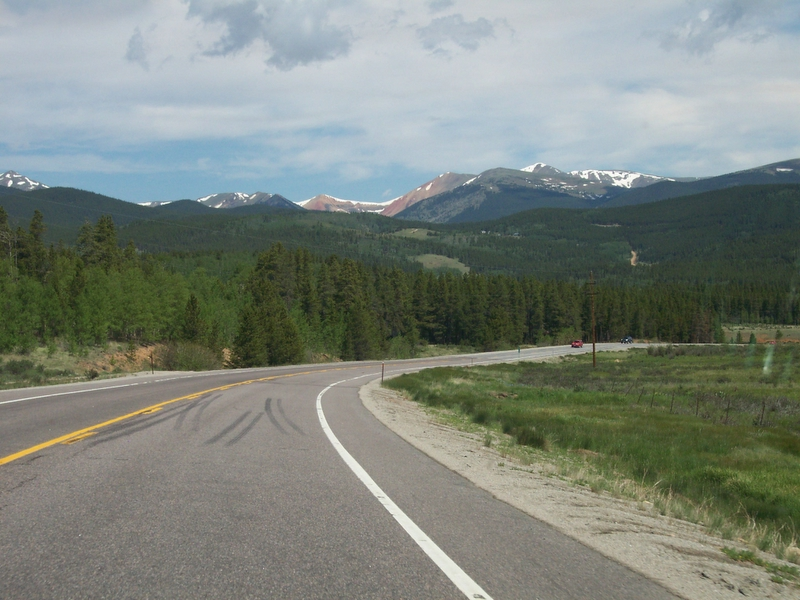
- Looking north toward the Front Range after the pass.
- Interactive map of Kenosha Pass
- Elevation: 9,984 feet (3,043 m)
- Traversed by: US 285

Third Approach
- Location: Park County, Colorado, U.S.
- Range: Front Range, Kenosha Mountains
- Coordinates: 39°24′48″N 105°45′24″W
- Topo map: USGS Jefferson

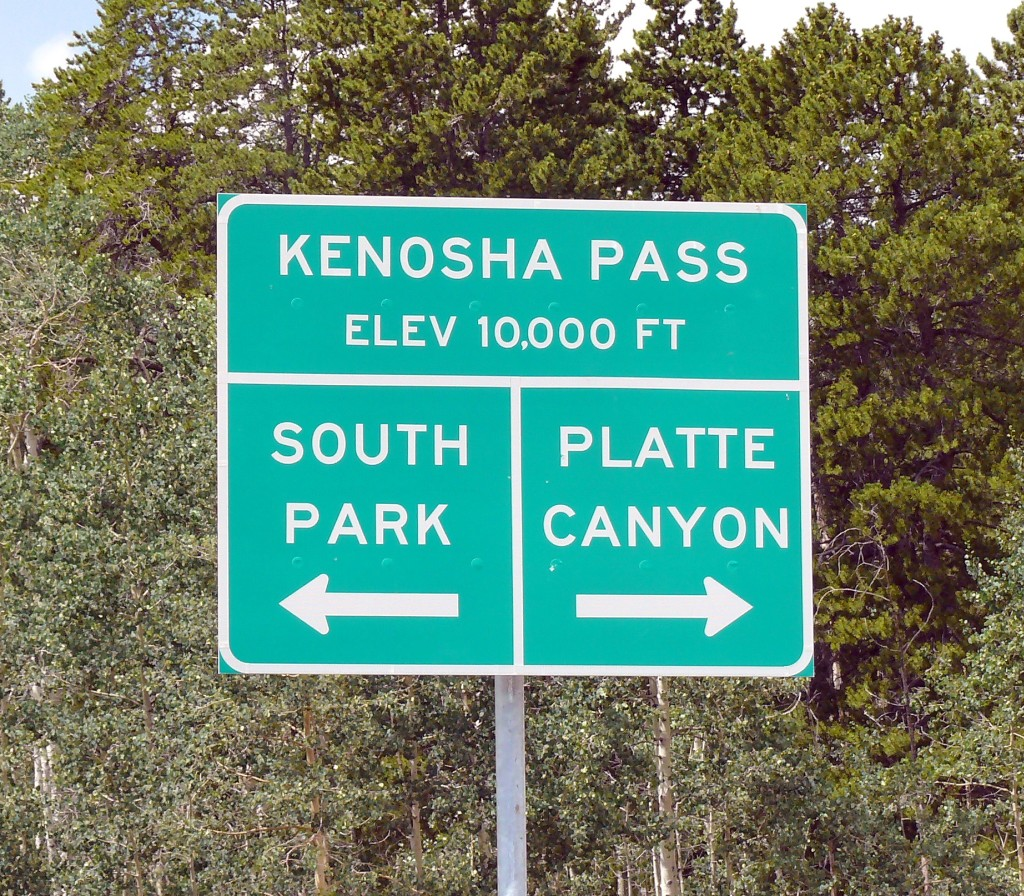
The pass sign

Kenosha Pass, elevation 9,984 ft (3,043 m), is a mountain pass in the Rocky Mountains of central Colorado in the United States.

The pass is located in the Rocky Mountains southwest of Denver, Colorado, just northeast of the town of Fairplay, Colorado. Geologically, the pass is located atop a large granite batholith (known as the Kenosha Batholith) that forms the spine of the Front Range along the eastern side of South Park. It is traversed by US 285 between the towns of Jefferson and Grant, and provides a route between the valley of the North Fork South Platte River and the headwaters of the South Platte River in South Park. In addition to providing one of the principal access routes to South Park, the pass offers dramatic views of the surrounding Rockies, including the nearby peaks of Mount Blue Sky and Mount Bierstadt.

== Description ==
The pass is easily traversable by most vehicles, never exceeding timberline and featuring easily negotiable curves along an amply wide highway. The approach on the (north-)eastern side is fairly gentle, ascending from near Grant up a gulch at the headwaters of the North Fork. The (south-)western side of the pass is steeper, winding up the flank of a mountainside east of the town of Jefferson. An overlook on the (south-)west side of the pass offers a panoramic view of South Park. The top of the pass is nearly flat and surrounded by the Pike National Forest, with a United States Forest Service campground on the summit. The Colorado Trail crosses the summit of Kenosha Pass. The trail portion near the campground and heading northwest is popular with mountain bike enthusiasts and hikers.

== History ==
The pass was used by Ute bands to reach the hunting grounds of South Park. In the 19th century the pass was used by white trappers to traverse the Front Range. During the Pike's Peak Gold Rush of the 1860s the pass was heavily used by prospectors eager to reach the placer gold fields at the headwaters of the South Platte near Fairplay and other South Park mining communities. The increase in traffic led to the widening of the trail into a wagon road; during the Colorado Silver Boom the pass became one of the main routes of entry for eager immigrants to Leadville, Breckenridge, and Aspen.

Sometime between 1861 and 1865, a two-story stagecoach station and inn called the Kenosha House was constructed by Charles and Agnes Wood Hepburn just north of the pass, offering meals and authentic mountain food such as Rocky Mountain raspberries, venison and wild duck, as well as lodging to weary travelers. There is discourse regarding the former location of the Kenosha House, though most historians place it somewhere between 0.5 miles and 1.6 miles north of the pass. The site is commonly mapped as sitting across from the intersection of modern-day U.S. Route 285 and County Road 58, along Hoosier Creek. The naturalist and horticulturist Theodore Mead passed through the area in the 1870s in search for undiscovered species of butterfly. Kenosha House was also visited by Schuyler Colfax, vice president to Ulysses S. Grant, in 1868. Kenosha house is suspected to have closed in the late 1890s. As of 2026, no remnants of the original Kenosha House have been found.

In 1879 the pass was traversed by the narrow gauge Denver, South Park and Pacific Railroad, and later the Colorado and Southern Railway, providing the first rail link between Denver and the South Park mining communities such as Fairplay (the tracks were removed in 1938, but the modern highway follows the old road and the railroad route over the pass - most of which is still visible). During this same year of 1879, the poet Walt Whitman crossed the pass and described its summit with these words, later published in Specimen Days:

I jot these lines literally at Kenosha summit, where we return, afternoon, and take a long rest, 10,000 feet above sea-level. At this immense height the South Park stretches fifty miles before me. Mountainous chains and peaks in every variety of perspective, every hue of vista, fringe the view...so the whole Western world is, in a sense, but an expansion of these mountains.

On July 25, 1936, Denver and Rio Grande Western locomotive #346, which was on loan to the Colorado and Southern at the time, rolled on the east side of the pass as it hit a corner at an estimated speed of ~40 mph. The engineer at the throttle, Eugene K. "Mickey" McGowan, was killed in the wreck. Kenosha Pass and the wreck of Denver & Rio Grande Western locomotive #346 are referenced in the title of the Mark "Hyce" Huber's song "Smells Like Kenosha".
