= Geneva Basin Ski Area =

Ski area in Colorado, United States

Geneva Basin
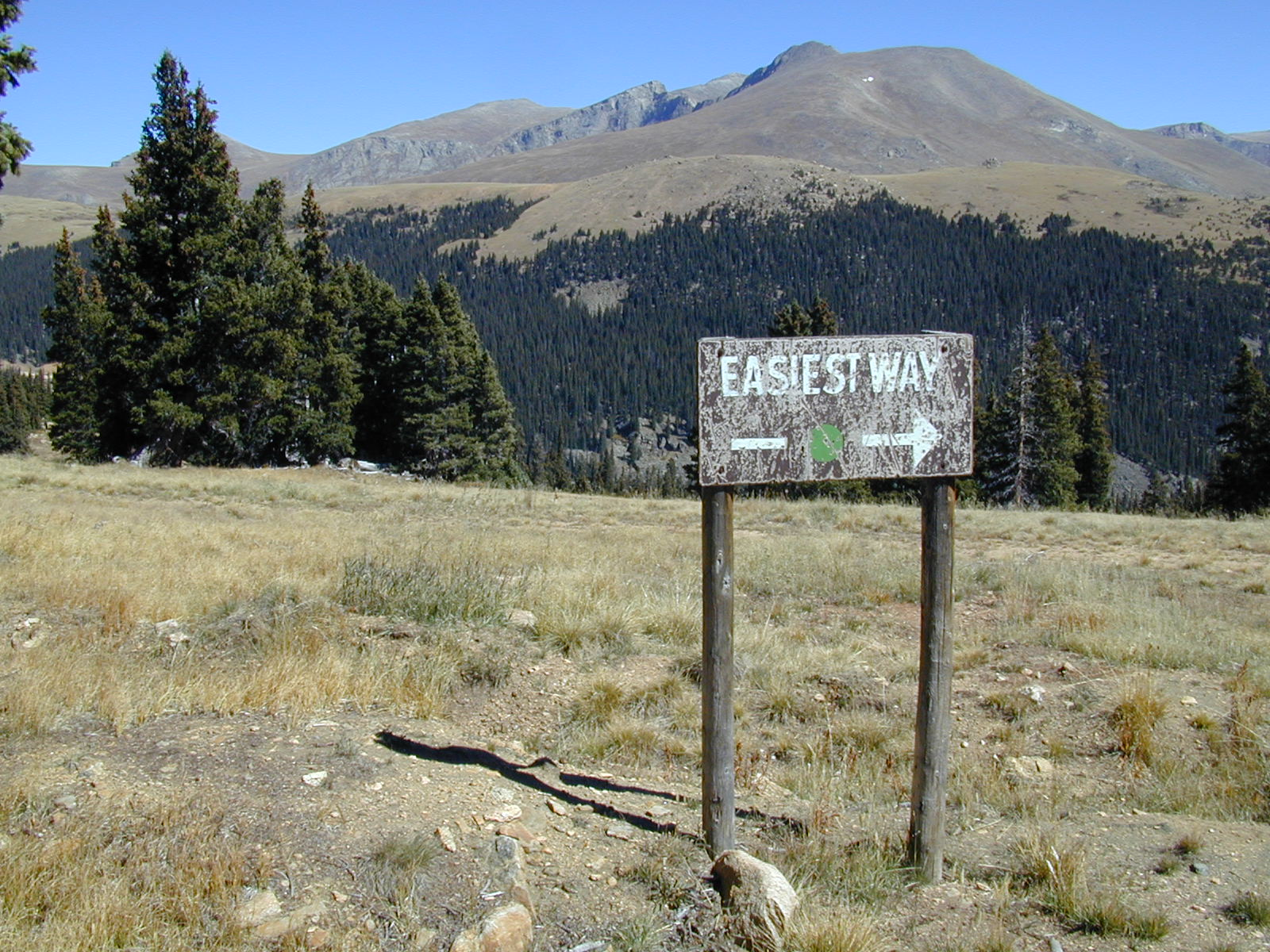
- Old trail marker at Geneva Basin.
- Interactive map of Geneva Basin
- Location: Pike National Forest; Clear Creek County, Colorado and Park County, Colorado
- Nearest city: Denver (60 mi (97 km))
- Coordinates: 39.5680427°N 105.7302839°W
- Vertical: 1,250 ft (380 m)
- Top elevation: 11,750 ft (3,580 m)
- Base elevation: 10,500 ft (3,200 m)
- Skiable area: 130 acres (53 ha)
- Trails: 16
- Snowfall: 300 inches (760 cm)

Geneva Basin (originally Indianhead Ski Area) was a ski area in the western United States, located in Clear Creek and Park County, Colorado, 10 mi (16 km) north of the community of Grant and 13 mi (21 km) south of the town of Georgetown. It is situated just south of the summit of Guanella Pass at an elevation of 11,750 ft (3,580 m).

Opened in 1961 as Indianhead Ski Area, the ski area operated under various owners before closing in 1984. The ski area is located within the Pike National Forest and was operated under permit from the United States Forest Service.

== History ==
Jack English, developer and owner of Indianhead Mountain Resort in Michigan, invested two years of improvements to the site that opened as Indianhead Ski Area of Colorado in December 1961 with two rope tows from the defunct Magic Mountain ski area in Golden, a Heron double chair, and a Constam T-bar. The runs were engineered by Sel Hannah. While the area received 300 inches (760 cm) of annual snowfall, the unpaved road adjacent to the ski area frustrated the ski area ownership. (Even today, Geneva Basin is on a 10 mi (16 km) section of Guanella Pass Road that is closed to traffic during the winter.)

Indianhead went into foreclosure and the property was sold at auction to then-state Senator (later Governor) Roy Romer and the Walter J. Burke family, who renamed the ski area to Geneva Basin. Operating with a chair, a T-bar, and a rope tow, Geneva Basin had 12,982 visitors in the 1964-1965 season. Two skiers were caught in an in-bounds avalanche on the Quick Slip run on December 20, 1965, killing one skier. The ski area was sold to an investment group based in Kansas in 1972 and the T-bar was replaced with a Heron Poma double chair in 1974.

Following a precipitous drop in business during the 1976-1977 season caused by an unusually low amount of snowfall, Geneva Basin installed US$400,000 (equivalent to $2,125,206 in 2025) in snowmaking equipment. The ski area changed hands numerous times from the mid-1970s to mid-1980s, during which time the ski area's facilities and maintenance declined. During the 1983-1984 season, an empty chair on the Duck Creek lift fell from the cable, prompting the Colorado Tramway Board to shut the ski area down until the maintenance issues were resolved. Unfortunately, the owners were unable to accomplish this.

The property was sold again to another investment group in 1985 with ambitious plans to revitalize the ski area. During the summer, the Duck Creek lift was removed and installation of a new Borvig triple chair began, which was to be called the Phoenix lift. The new lift ran parallel to the former Duck Creek lift but was positioned farther right, making the high-speed Poma lift serving the bowl unnecessary. The investors had financial troubles and were not able to pay for the completion of the chairlift, so neither the lift's drive unit nor chairs were installed. The owners went into bankruptcy and a salvage sale stripped the ski area of its physical assets.

Development corporations formed and proposals were made over the years following the ski area's closure, including ones made by Michael Marsh in 1991 and 1992 that would have reopened the existing facilities and complete the snowmaking system. In November 1993, Park County voters were asked to approve a recreation tax designed to finance the ski area's reopening. It was defeated by a margin of 2:1.

Forest Service employees burned down the ski lodge on November 5, 1993 to avoid further vandalism and any associated liability. Park County officials were sent a letter of apology a few weeks later by the Forest Service for not properly informing citizens of the method for demolition.

The ski patrol building at the top of the former Duck Creek lift remains standing. It is used by backcountry skiers that travel by foot from an access gate to ski the former trails.

== Terrain and lifts ==
Geneva Basin had 16 trails:

- 5 Beginner
- 3 Intermediate
- 8 Advanced

At its height, Geneva Basin ran two double chairs and two Poma lifts.

Name	Type	Manufacturer	Built	Vertical (feet)	Length (feet)	Notes
Duck Creek	double chair	Heron	1961	1250	3250	
Sundance	T-bar	--	c. 1964	--	2250	replaced by the Sundance chair
Beginner's Poma	Poma	--	before 1970	--	600	also called Beeline Poma
High Speed Poma	Poma	--	1967	--	1200	
Sundance	double chair	Heron-Poma	1974	--	3250	
Phoenix	triple chair	Borvig	1985	--	--	never completed

== Gallery ==
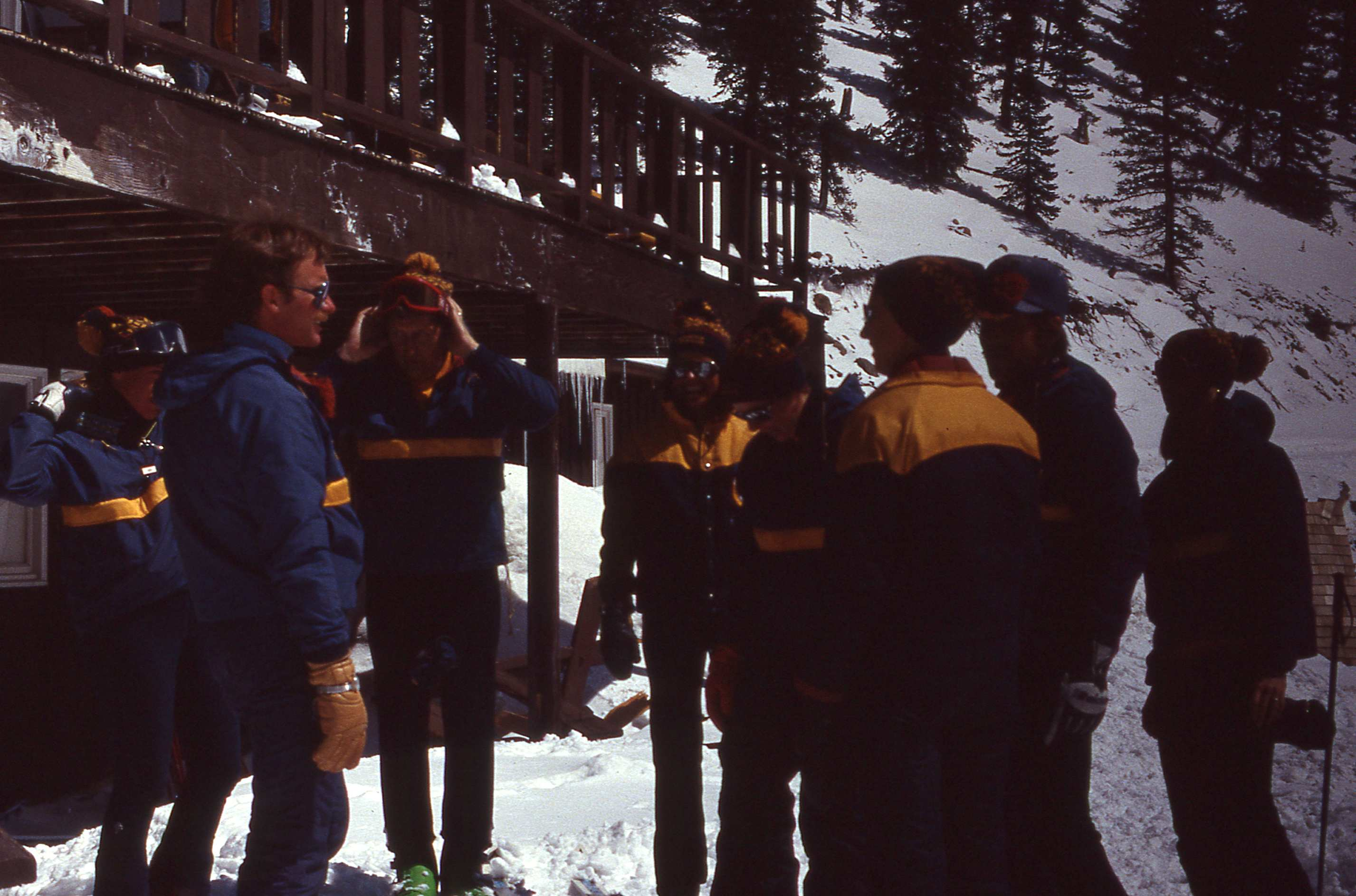
Geneva Basin Ski School Instructors (1979)

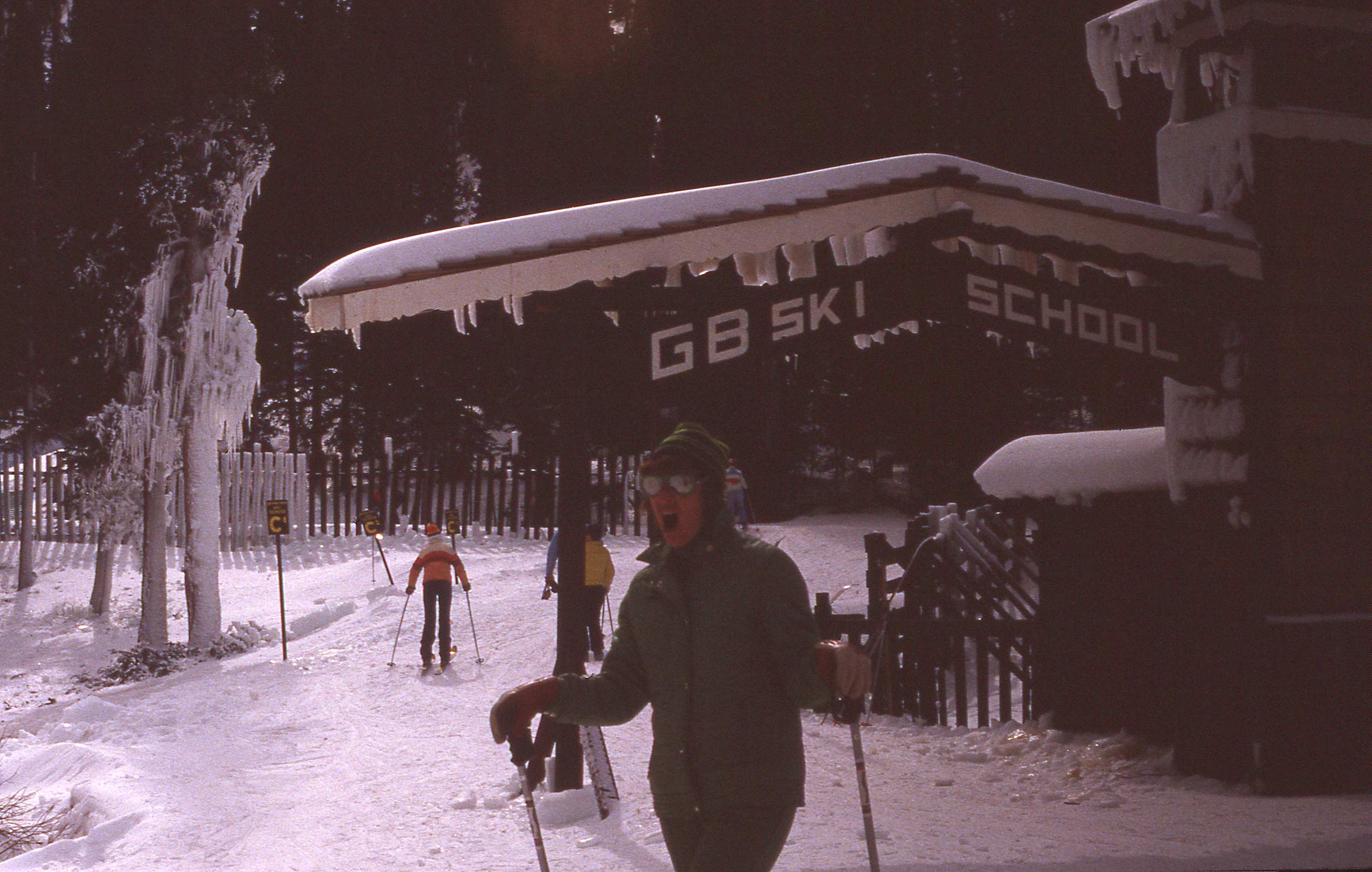
Geneva Basin Ski School area (1979)
