= Geneva Creek =

Geneva Creek may refer to:

- Geneva Creek (Colorado)
- Geneva Creek (Texas), Texas
