= LandVote =

LandVote, developed by The Trust for Public Land, is a comprehensive database of conservation ballot measures. LandVote documents all of the conservation ballot measures voted on since 1999. The database is organized by state, finance mechanisms, and jurisdiction type. LandVote is designed for communities, policymakers, and conservation professionals.
