= Guanella Pass =

Mountain pass in Colorado, USA

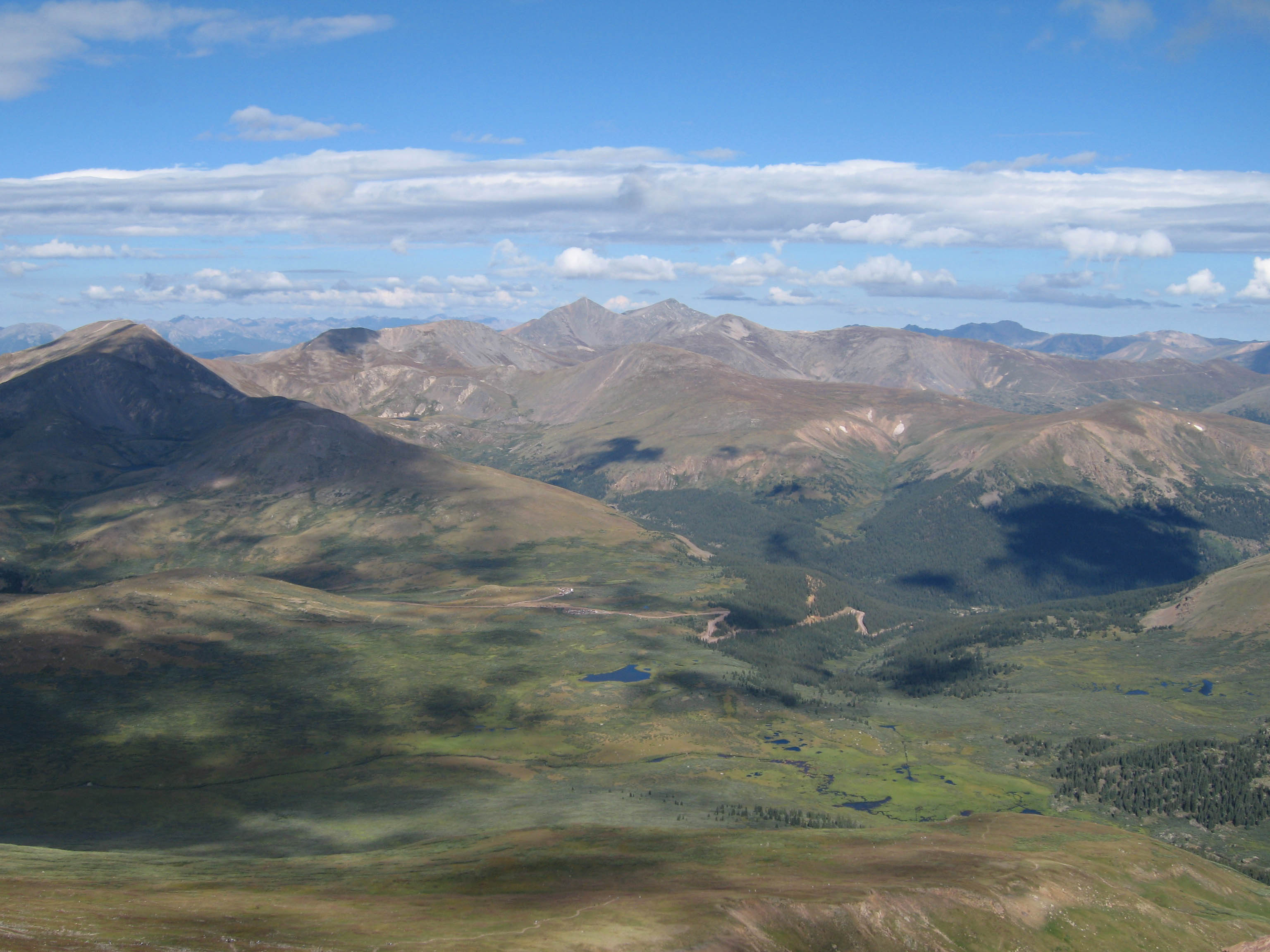
- Guanella Pass from Mount Bierstadt
- Interactive map of Guanella Pass
- Elevation: 11,669 feet (3,557 m)
- Traversed by: Guanella Pass Scenic Byway

Third Approach
- Location: Clear Creek County, Colorado, U.S.
- Range: Front Range
- Coordinates: 39°35′42″N 105°42′40″W
- Topo map: USGS Mount Evans

Guanella Pass (elevation 11,669 ft or 3,557 m) is a high mountain pass in central Colorado, in the Rocky Mountains of the western United States.

The pass is located in southwestern Clear Creek County, in the Front Range west of Denver and south of Georgetown. The pass was named in 1953 for Byron Guanella, a road supervisor and commissioner in Clear Creek County for nearly 50 years.

The pass provides a route between Georgetown in the valley of Clear Creek to the north and Grant in the valley of Geneva Creek, a tributary of the North Fork South Platte River, to the south. The pass is traversed by the Guanella Pass Scenic Byway. The road provides a link between Interstate 70 to the north and U.S. Highway 285 to the south. From Georgetown, take Clear County Road 381 south for 11 miles to the pass; from Grant, take Park County Road 62 13.5 miles to the pass.

The entire route from Georgetown to U.S. Highway 285 is paved, but is not maintained in the winter and often closed seasonally after the first heavy snow. There is a parking area at the closure gate on the Georgetown side of the pass to allow access to the pass by foot or snowmobile during the winter.

At the summit of the pass, hiking trails lead east to Mount Bierstadt (elevation 14,060 ft (4,290 m)) and west to Square Top Mountain, with many other trails connecting to lower parts of the pass.

The Geneva Basin Ski Area which existed from 1963 to 1984 was located just a few miles south of the pass summit.

== Climate ==
Guanella Pass has a subarctic climate (Köppen Dfc).

Climate data for Guanella Pass 39.5911 N, 105.7172 W, Elevation: 11,663 ft (3,555 m) (1991–2020 normals)
Month	Jan	Feb	Mar	Apr	May	Jun	Jul	Aug	Sep	Oct	Nov	Dec	Year
Mean daily maximum °F (°C)	24.4 (−4.2)	25.6 (−3.6)	32.7 (0.4)	38.5 (3.6)	47.2 (8.4)	58.4 (14.7)	64.0 (17.8)	61.4 (16.3)	55.1 (12.8)	43.6 (6.4)	32.1 (0.1)	24.1 (−4.4)	42.3 (5.7)
Daily mean °F (°C)	14.7 (−9.6)	15.5 (−9.2)	21.5 (−5.8)	27.0 (−2.8)	36.0 (2.2)	46.1 (7.8)	52.0 (11.1)	50.1 (10.1)	43.8 (6.6)	33.1 (0.6)	22.4 (−5.3)	14.7 (−9.6)	31.4 (−0.3)
Mean daily minimum °F (°C)	5.0 (−15.0)	5.4 (−14.8)	10.2 (−12.1)	15.6 (−9.1)	24.7 (−4.1)	33.9 (1.1)	40.0 (4.4)	38.9 (3.8)	32.4 (0.2)	22.5 (−5.3)	12.6 (−10.8)	5.3 (−14.8)	20.5 (−6.4)
Average precipitation inches (mm)	2.04 (52)	2.10 (53)	2.56 (65)	3.29 (84)	2.59 (66)	1.53 (39)	2.60 (66)	2.45 (62)	1.79 (45)	1.73 (44)	1.91 (49)	1.94 (49)	26.53 (674)
Source: PRISM Climate Group
