= Carrie Besnette Hauser =

American academic administrator

- Born: Carrie Anna Besnette

Academic background
- Education: University of Arizona; University of California, Los Angeles

Carrie Besnette Hauser is an American higher education, philanthropy, and conservation leader serving as the president and chief executive officer of Trust for Public Land since 2024. An avid outdoorswoman, she has summited Colorado’s 58 14,000 thousand foot peaks (14ers), climbed mountains across the United States and abroad, and is a former river guide (“Swamper”) in Grand Canyon national park.

== Life ==
Hauser was born and raised in Flagstaff, Arizona. She graduated from Flagstaff High School and went on to complete a Bachelor’s degree from the University of Arizona and master's and doctorate degrees from the University of California, Los Angeles. She holds advanced certificates from the Wharton School of Business and Harvard’s School of Education.

Hauser has held leadership positions with the Western Interstate Commission on Higher Education, the Daniels Fund, Metropolitan State University of Denver, and the Ewing Marion Kauffman Foundation. In 2013, she was selected as the ninth president and chief executive officer of Colorado Mountain College concluding her service in 2024 as the first President Emerita in the college's history. Hauser has served on various non-profit and state boards including the American Council on Education, American Rivers, and chair of the Colorado Parks and Wildlife Commission.

Hauser married Jeff Hauser on May 29, 2010, in Jefferson, Colorado.
