= ParkServe =

Platform for tracking and mapping urban park access across the US

Published in spring 2017 by The Trust for Public Land, ParkServe is a platform for tracking and mapping urban park access across the United States. The comprehensive database includes 14,000 cities, impacting a population of over 160 million people. The database is to be used by residents and planners alike, by providing information about parks closest to home as well as statistics about the number of people living within a 10-minute walk from a park. This allows for residents to advocate for park creation while helping to keep planners informed about where parks are most needed, and the demographic of the people it will serve to address inequity.
