= Square Top Mountain =

Mountain in Colorado, United States

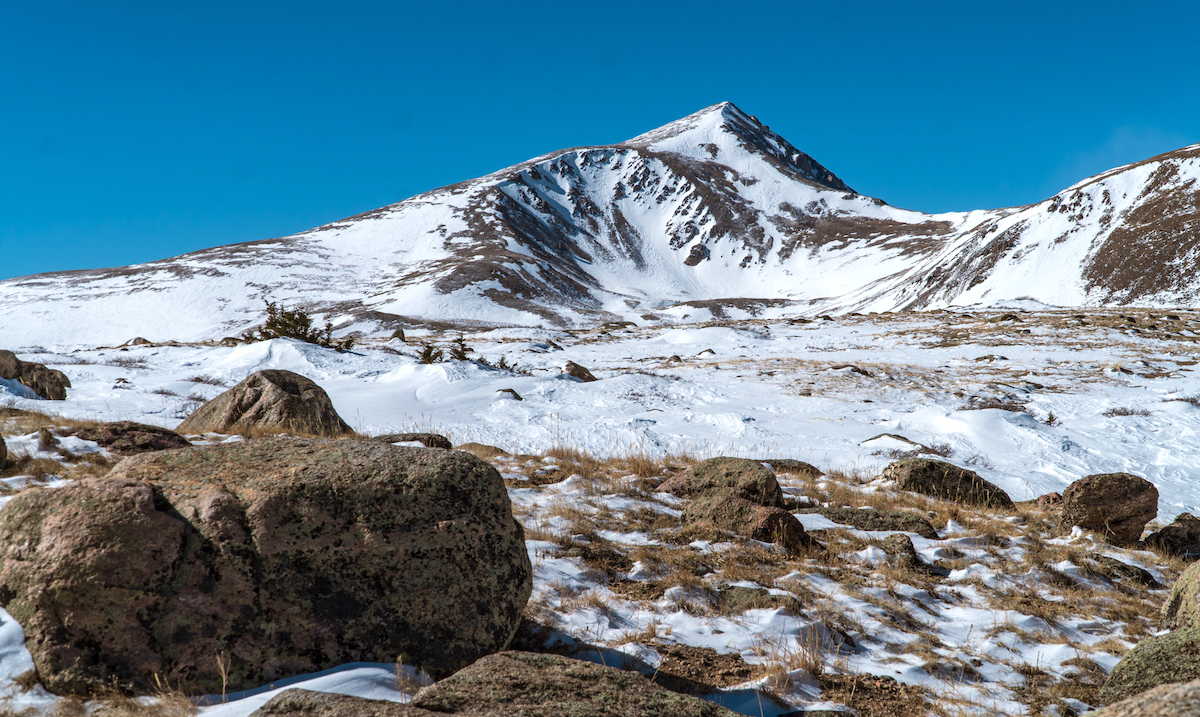
- East aspect in winter

Highest point
- Elevation: 13,794 ft (4,204 m)
- Prominence: 794 ft (242 m)
- Parent peak: Mount Edwards (13,856 ft)
- Isolation: 3.39 mi (5.46 km)
- Coordinates: 39°35′33″N 105°45′50″W

Geography
- Location within Colorado Location within the United States
- Country: United States
- State: Colorado
- County: Clear Creek County
- Parent range: Rocky Mountains; Front Range
- Topo map: USGS Montezuma

Climbing
- Easiest route: Hiking class 2

Square Top Mountain is a 13,794-foot (4,204 m) mountain summit in Clear Creek County, Colorado, United States.

== Description ==
Square Top Mountain is set approximately one mile (1.6 km) east of the Continental Divide in the Front Range which is a subrange of the Rocky Mountains. The mountain is located 42 miles (68 km) west-southwest of Denver and three miles (4.8 km) west of Guanella Pass on land managed by Arapaho National Forest and Pike National Forest. It ranks as the 111th-highest peak in Colorado. Precipitation runoff from the mountain's north slope drains into South Clear Creek and the south slope drains to Geneva Creek. Topographic relief is significant as the summit rises 3,700 feet (1,128 m) above Geneva Creek in two miles (3.2 km) and 2,600 feet (792 m) above Smelter Gulch in one mile (1.6 km). An ascent of the peak involves hiking seven miles (11 km) with 2,400 feet (732 m) of elevation gain from Guanella Pass via the Square Top Lakes Trail. The mountain's descriptive toponym was officially adopted on June 7, 1933, by the United States Board on Geographic Names. Prior to that it was also called Lewis Mountain or Mt. Lewis.

== Climate ==
According to the Köppen climate classification system, Square Top is located in an alpine subarctic climate zone with cold, snowy winters, and cool to warm summers. Due to its altitude, it receives precipitation all year, as snow in winter, and as thunderstorms in summer, with a dry period in late spring.

Climate data for Square Top Mountain 39.5947 N, 105.7587 W, Elevation: 13,409 ft (4,087 m) (1991–2020 normals)
Month	Jan	Feb	Mar	Apr	May	Jun	Jul	Aug	Sep	Oct	Nov	Dec	Year
Mean daily maximum °F (°C)	19.6 (−6.9)	18.6 (−7.4)	25.3 (−3.7)	32.6 (0.3)	40.9 (4.9)	51.5 (10.8)	57.6 (14.2)	55.0 (12.8)	48.8 (9.3)	37.7 (3.2)	26.5 (−3.1)	19.9 (−6.7)	36.2 (2.3)
Daily mean °F (°C)	9.4 (−12.6)	8.5 (−13.1)	14.2 (−9.9)	20.2 (−6.6)	28.9 (−1.7)	38.9 (3.8)	45.2 (7.3)	43.3 (6.3)	37.0 (2.8)	26.6 (−3.0)	16.6 (−8.6)	9.9 (−12.3)	24.9 (−4.0)
Mean daily minimum °F (°C)	−0.8 (−18.2)	−1.6 (−18.7)	3.0 (−16.1)	7.7 (−13.5)	16.8 (−8.4)	26.4 (−3.1)	32.8 (0.4)	31.5 (−0.3)	25.2 (−3.8)	15.6 (−9.1)	6.7 (−14.1)	−0.2 (−17.9)	13.6 (−10.2)
Average precipitation inches (mm)	2.86 (73)	2.88 (73)	3.09 (78)	3.56 (90)	2.92 (74)	1.65 (42)	2.76 (70)	2.61 (66)	1.93 (49)	2.09 (53)	2.47 (63)	2.67 (68)	31.49 (799)
Source: PRISM Climate Group

== Gallery ==
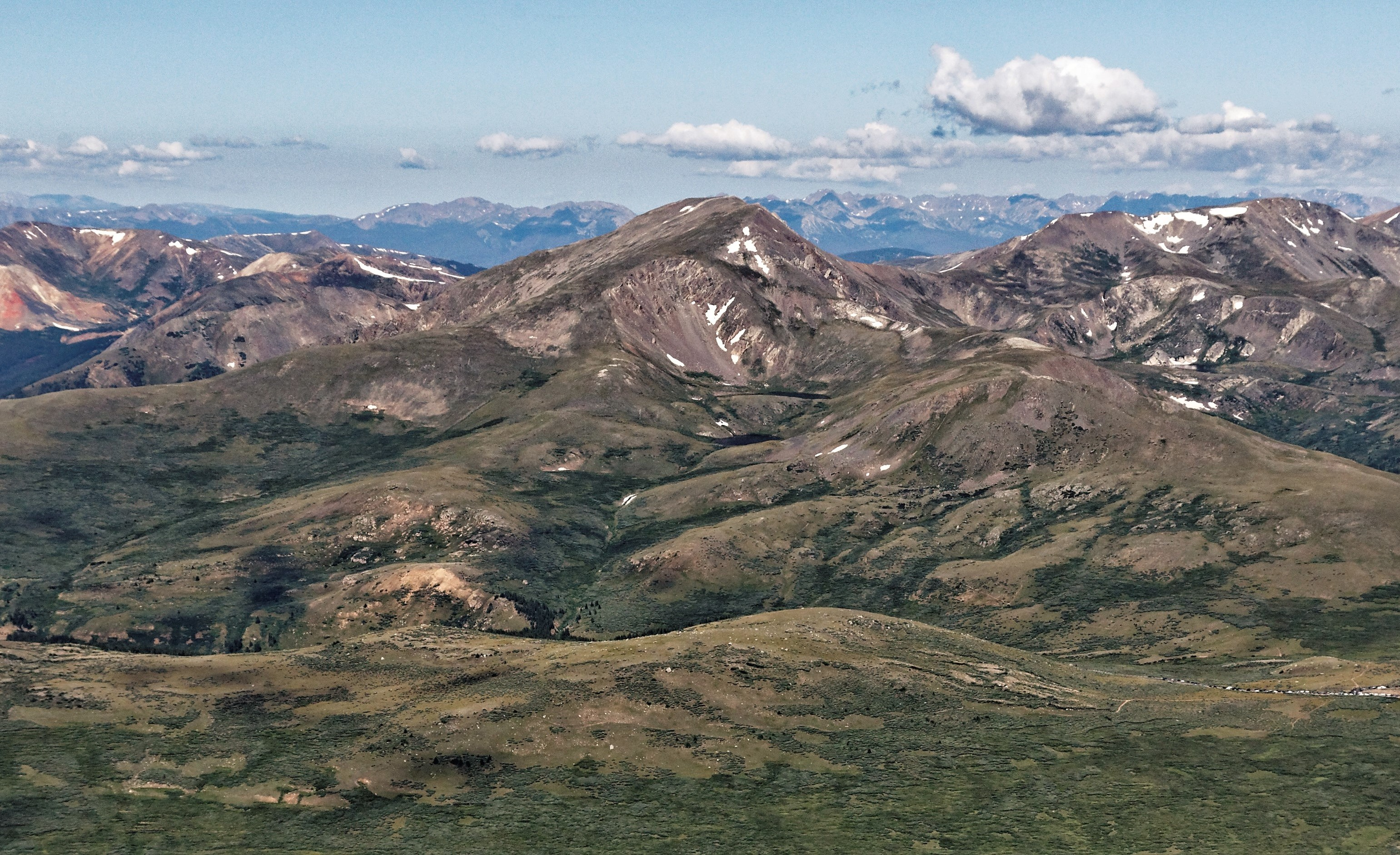
East aspect of Square Top from Mount Bierstadt

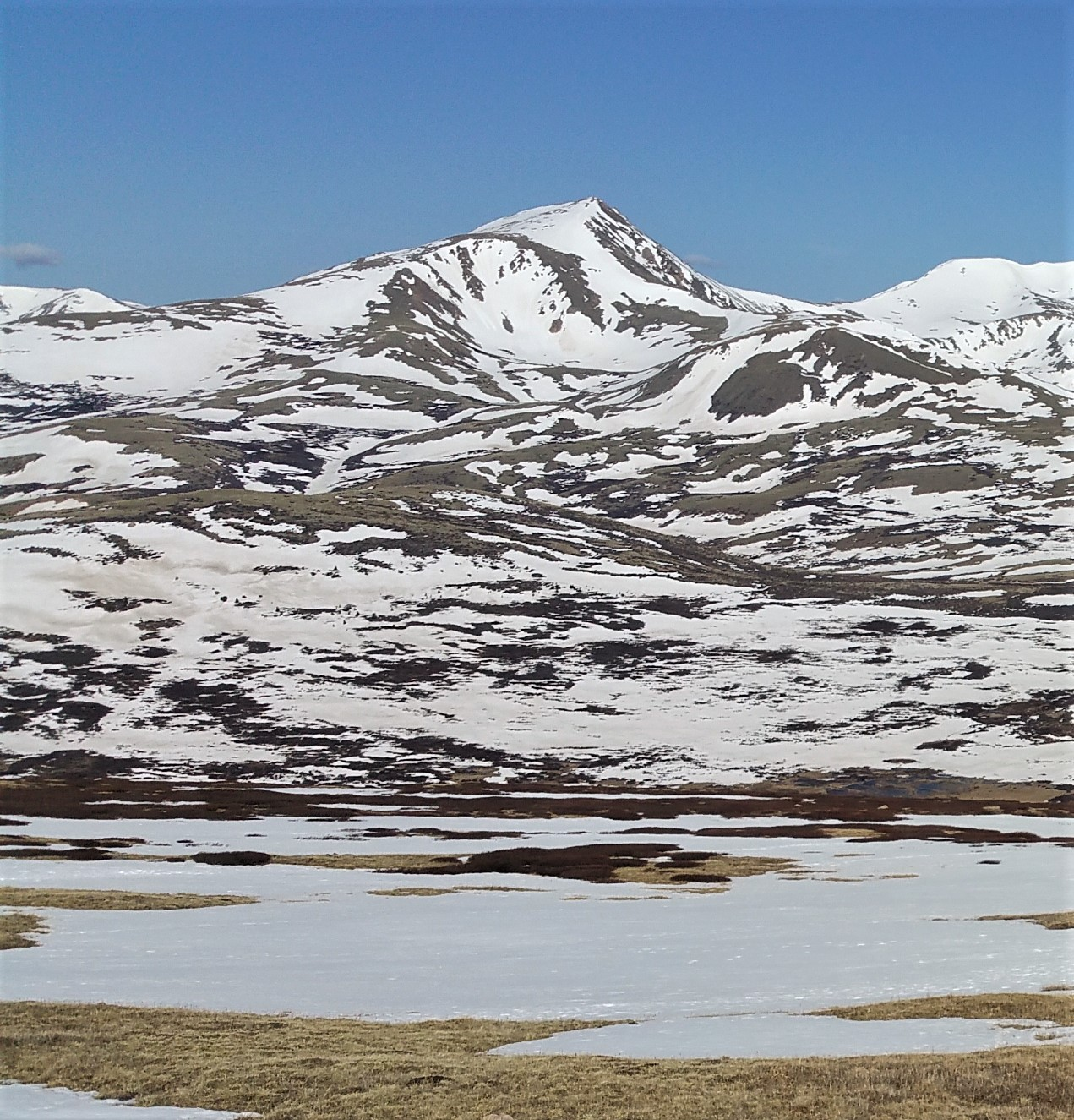
East aspect

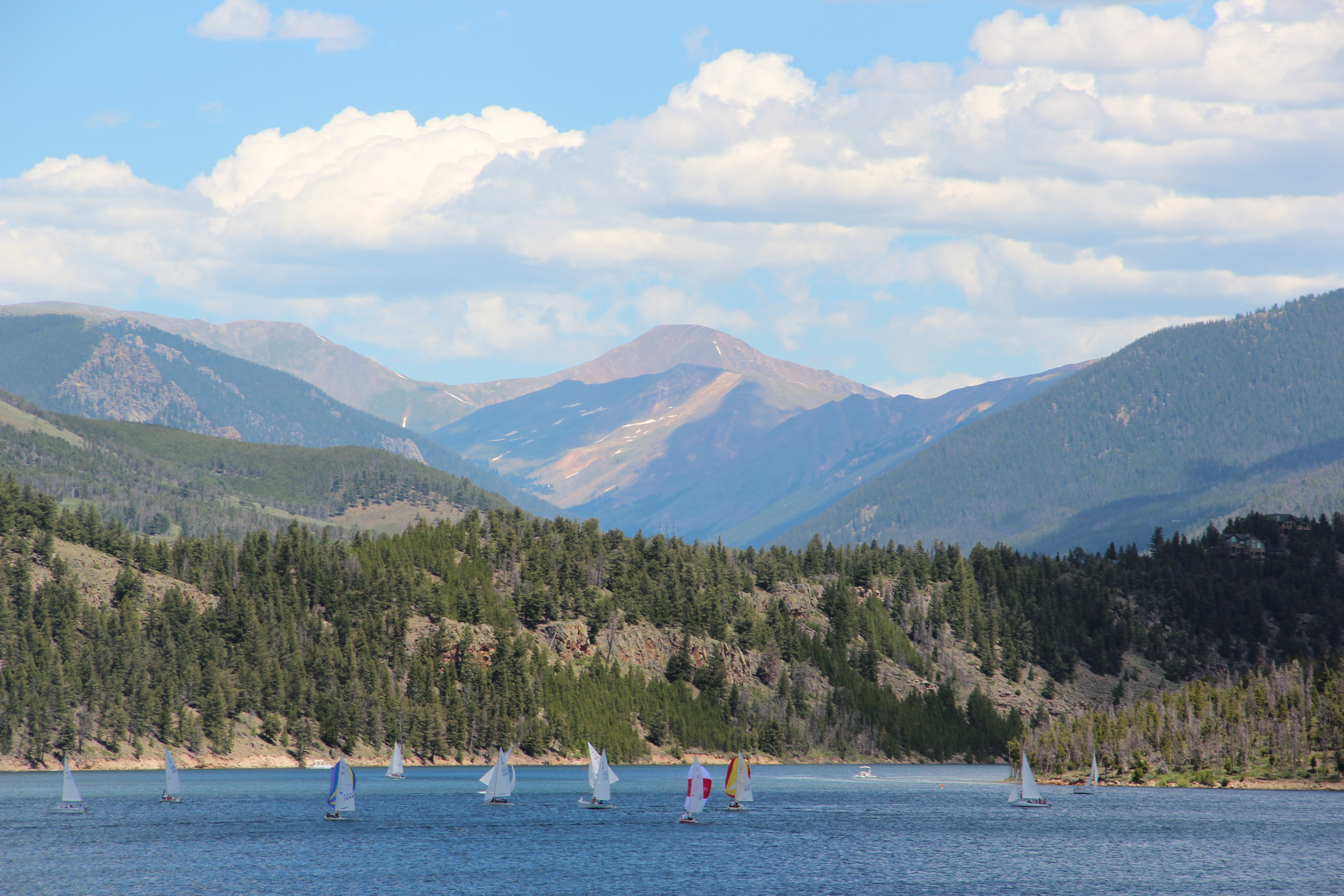
Square Top viewed from Dillon Reservoir

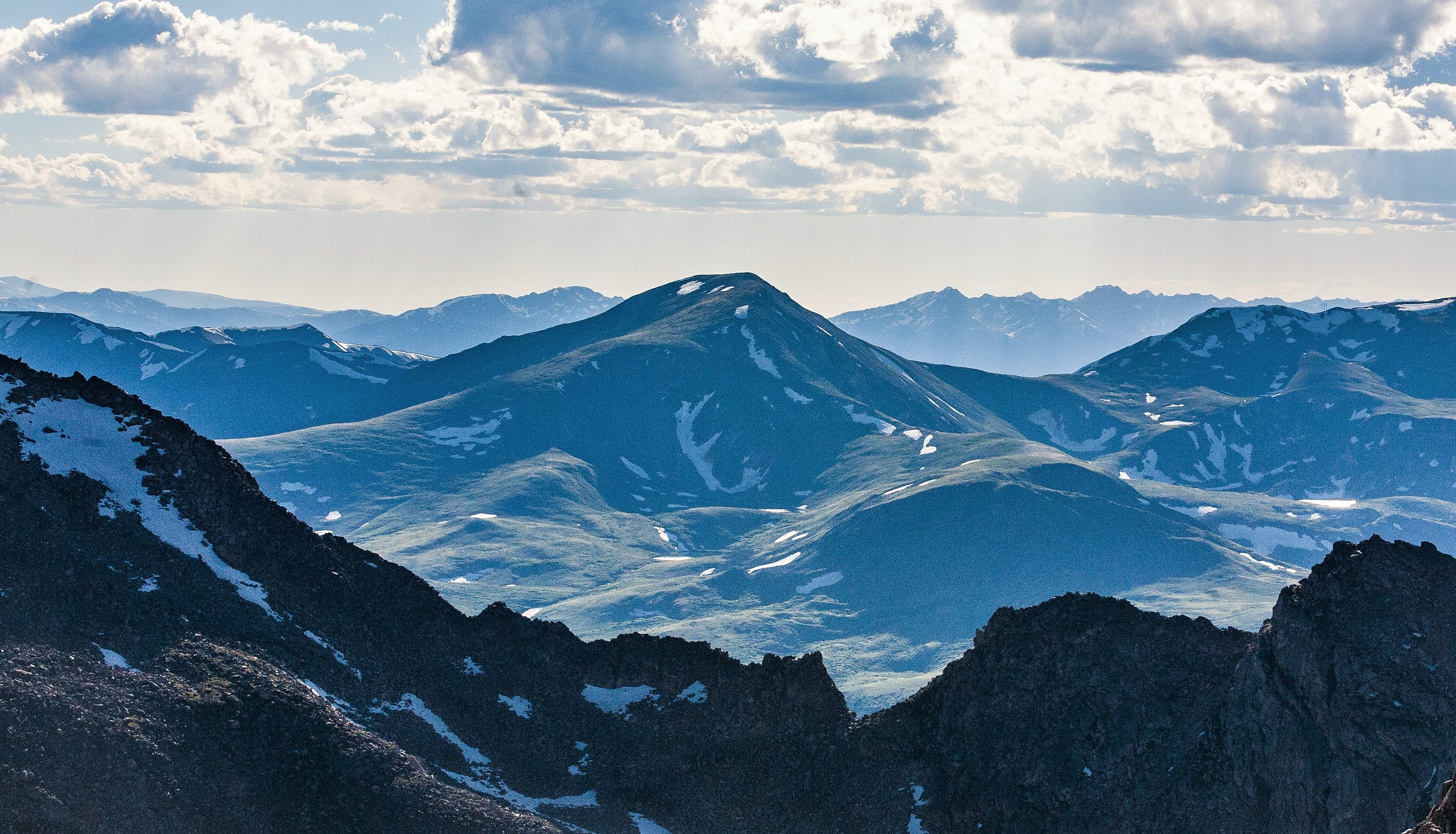
Square Top from Mt. Evans

== See also ==
- List of mountain peaks of Colorado
