= The Sawtooth =

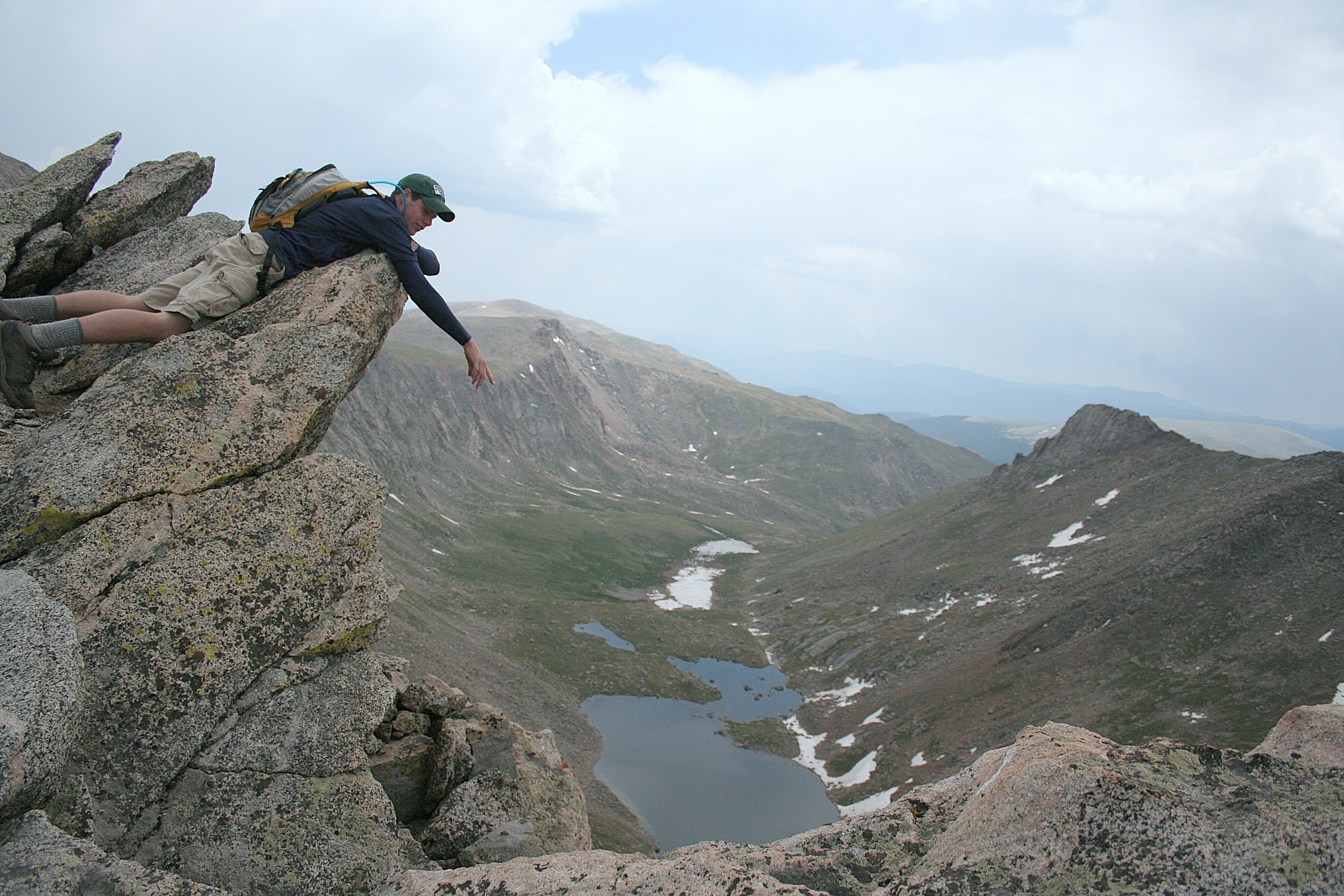
- A climber leaning on an overhang that's part of the sawtooth. Behind him, to the left, is a shoulder of Mount Blue Sky, and Mount Bierstadt is to the right, off screen. Abyss Lake can be seen below.

Highest point
- Elevation: 13,786 ft (4,202 m)
- Prominence: 120 ft (37 m)
- Isolation: 0.62 mi (1.00 km)
- Coordinates: 39°35′21″N 105°39′57″W

Geography
- Location within Colorado
- Location: Clear Creek County, Colorado, United States
- Parent range: Front Range, Chicago Peaks
- Topo map(s): USGS 7.5' topographic map Mount Evans, Colorado

Climbing
- Easiest route: Class 3 from Guanella Pass, 6.75 mile round trip

The Sawtooth is a jagged arête joining Mount Bierstadt to (eventually) Mount Blue Sky in the Front Range of central Colorado. The three points along this arête resemble the teeth of a saw, leading to its name. The southeast wall of the arête is the head of the cirque above Abyss Lake, while its northwest wall is the cirque at the head of a valley near the summit of Guanella Pass. The northeast end of the sawtooth joins directly to the shoulder of Mount Spalding, from which a second (and slightly less abrupt) arête leads southeast to Mount Blue Sky. This second arête divides the glacial valley of Abyss Lake to the southwest from the cirque of Summit Lake to the northeast.

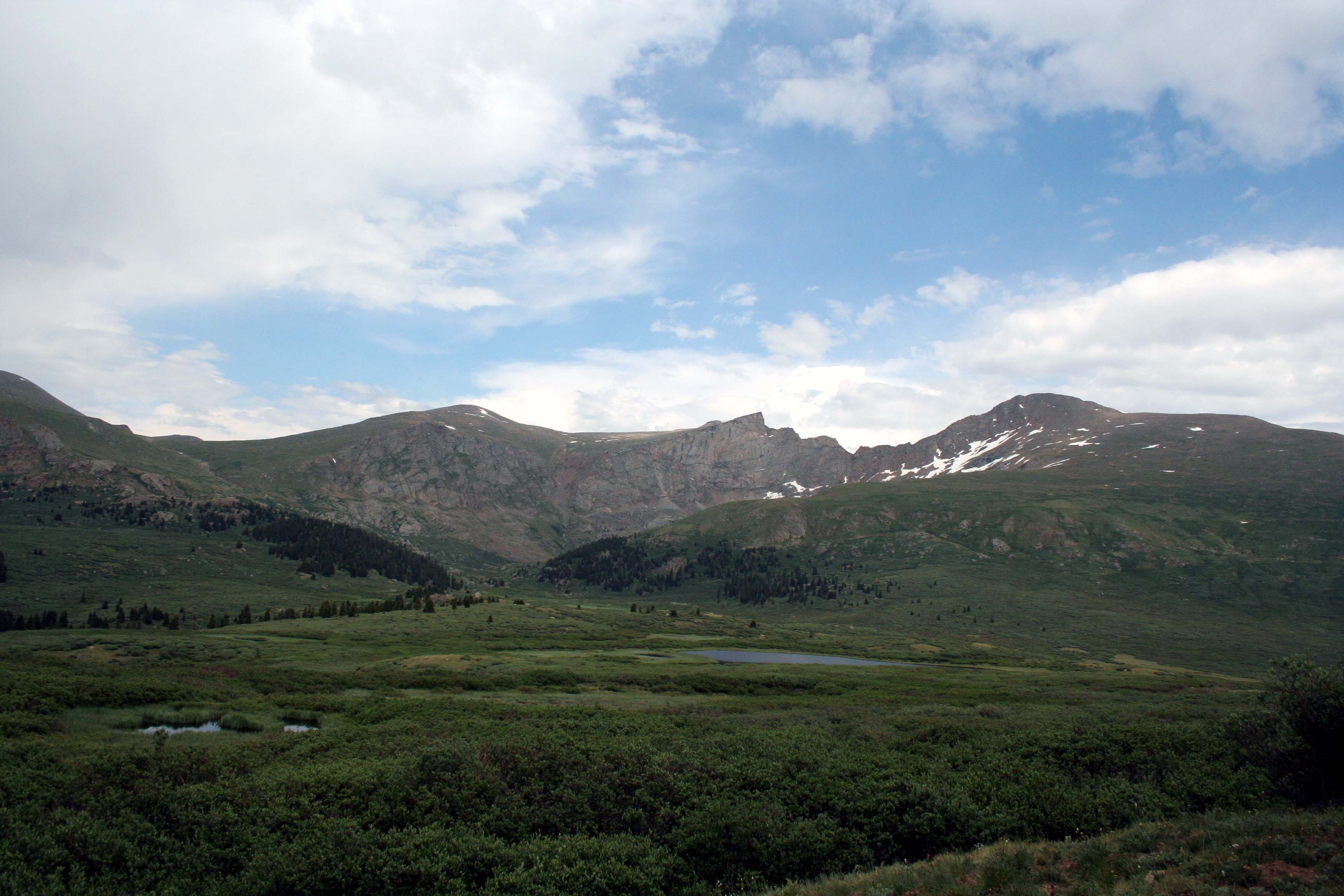
Mount Spalding on the left, The Sawtooth, center, and Mount Bierstadt on the right, seen from Guanella Pass, to the northwest

== See also ==
- List of Colorado mountain ranges
- List of Colorado mountain summits
  - List of Colorado fourteeners
  - List of Colorado 4000 meter prominent summits
  - List of the most prominent summits of Colorado
- List of Colorado county high points
