= Jefferson, Colorado =

Unincorporated community in Park County, CO, USA

- Unincorporated community
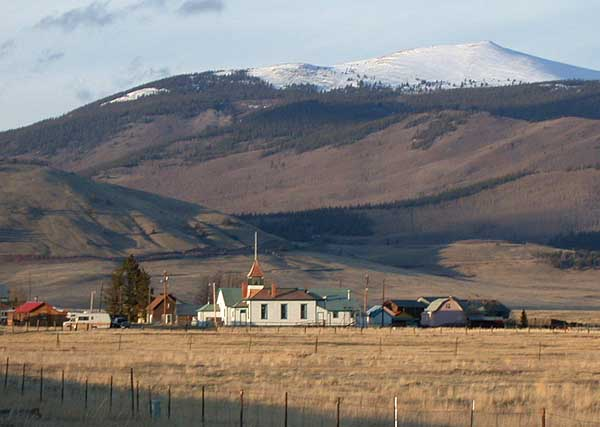
- The community of Jefferson, showing one-room school house, seen looking eastward from U.S. Route 285, May 2005

- Location within the state of Colorado
- Coordinates: 39°22′38″N 105°48′02″W
- Country: United States
- State: Colorado
- County: Park
- Elevation: 9,502 ft (2,896 m)
- Time zone: UTC-7 (MST)
  - Summer (DST): UTC-6 (MDT)
- ZIP code: 80456
- GNIS feature ID: 204725

Jefferson is an unincorporated community in Park County, Colorado, United States.

== Description ==
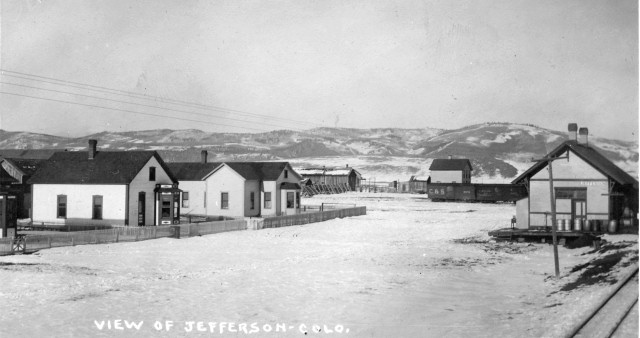
Jefferson in early 1900s

The community is located in the northern end of South Park, along U.S. Route 285 (US 285), approximately 15 miles (24 km) northeast of Fairplay, at the western foot of Kenosha Pass. It lies 6 miles (9.7 km) from Como, 23 miles (37 km) from Bailey, and 37 miles (60 km) from Breckenridge.

The community consists largely of a strip of retail businesses along US 285, as well as a small unpaved grid of houses and trailers on the south side of the highway. The most notable landmarks in the community are a historic one-room schoolhouse and the Historic Jefferson Denver, South Park and Pacific Railroad (DSP&P RR)Depot (c. 1880), highly visible in the surrounding grasslands of South Park. The Jefferson Post Office has the ZIP Code 80456. However, the post office closed in 2022.

== Climate ==
Climate data for Jefferson (CoAgMet), Colorado, 2012–2022 normals: 9460ft (2883m)
Month	Jan	Feb	Mar	Apr	May	Jun	Jul	Aug	Sep	Oct	Nov	Dec	Year
Mean daily maximum °F (°C)	32.2 (0.1)	33.8 (1.0)	42.4 (5.8)	48.2 (9.0)	58.4 (14.7)	71.0 (21.7)	73.2 (22.9)	71.4 (21.9)	67.8 (19.9)	54.4 (12.4)	43.3 (6.3)	32.5 (0.3)	52.4 (11.3)
Daily mean °F (°C)	18.0 (−7.8)	19.1 (−7.2)	26.6 (−3.0)	32.7 (0.4)	41.1 (5.1)	51.0 (10.6)	54.8 (12.7)	52.8 (11.6)	48.2 (9.0)	36.3 (2.4)	26.4 (−3.1)	17.6 (−8.0)	35.4 (1.9)
Mean daily minimum °F (°C)	3.6 (−15.8)	4.3 (−15.4)	10.6 (−11.9)	17.0 (−8.3)	23.6 (−4.7)	30.8 (−0.7)	36.2 (2.3)	34.0 (1.1)	28.4 (−2.0)	18.2 (−7.7)	9.5 (−12.5)	2.6 (−16.3)	18.2 (−7.7)
Source 1: XMACIS2
Source 2: CoAgMet
