= Geneva Creek (Colorado) =

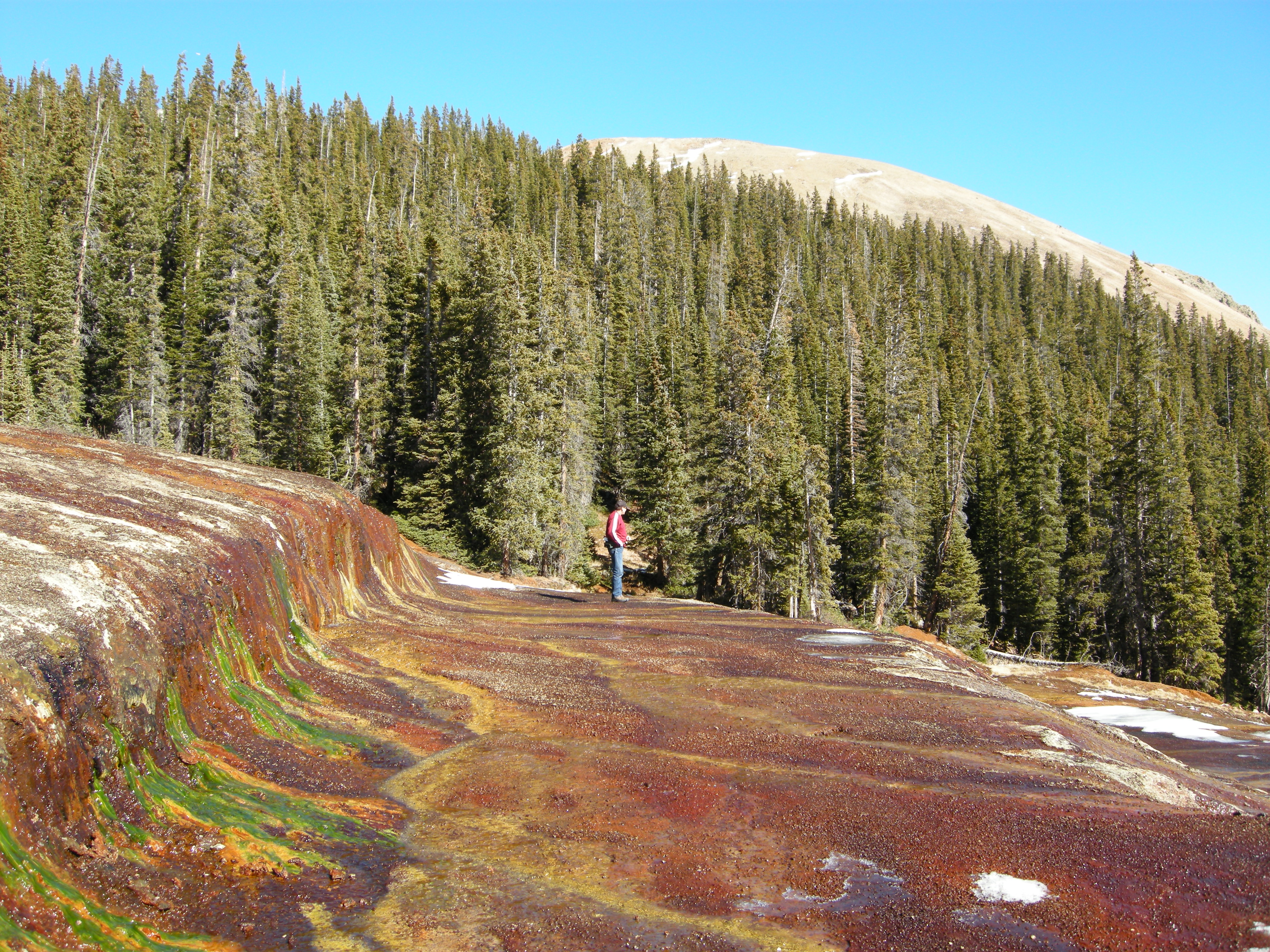
- Terraces formed by mineral springs in upper Geneva Creek

Physical characteristics
- Source
  - location: Clear Creek County, Colorado
  - coordinates: 39°34′18″N 105°50′09″W
- Mouth
  - location: Confluence with North Fork South Platte
  - coordinates: 39°27′35″N 105°39′50″W
  - elevation: 8,589 ft (2,618 m)

Basin features
- Progression: North Fork South Platte— South Platte—Platte— Missouri—Mississippi

Geneva Creek is a short tributary of the North Fork South Platte River, approximately 14.7 miles (23.7 km) long, in central Colorado in the United States. It drains part of the Rocky Mountains southwest of Denver in northern Park County. It rises at the continental divide west of Mount Bierstadt and descends through a canyon to the southeast. It joins the North Fork South Platte from the north at Grant along U.S. Highway 285. The valley of the river provides the route of the Guanella Pass Scenic Byway between Georgetown and Grant.

The upper part of Geneva Creek is an iron fen, where iron oxide is deposited by mineral-rich groundwater coming to the surface. The area is within the Colorado Mineral Belt, and gold and silver deposits were mined nearby at the now-deserted town of Geneva. Natural springs add high dissolved concentrations of copper and zinc to the stream.

== See also ==
- List of rivers of Colorado
