= North Fork South Platte River =

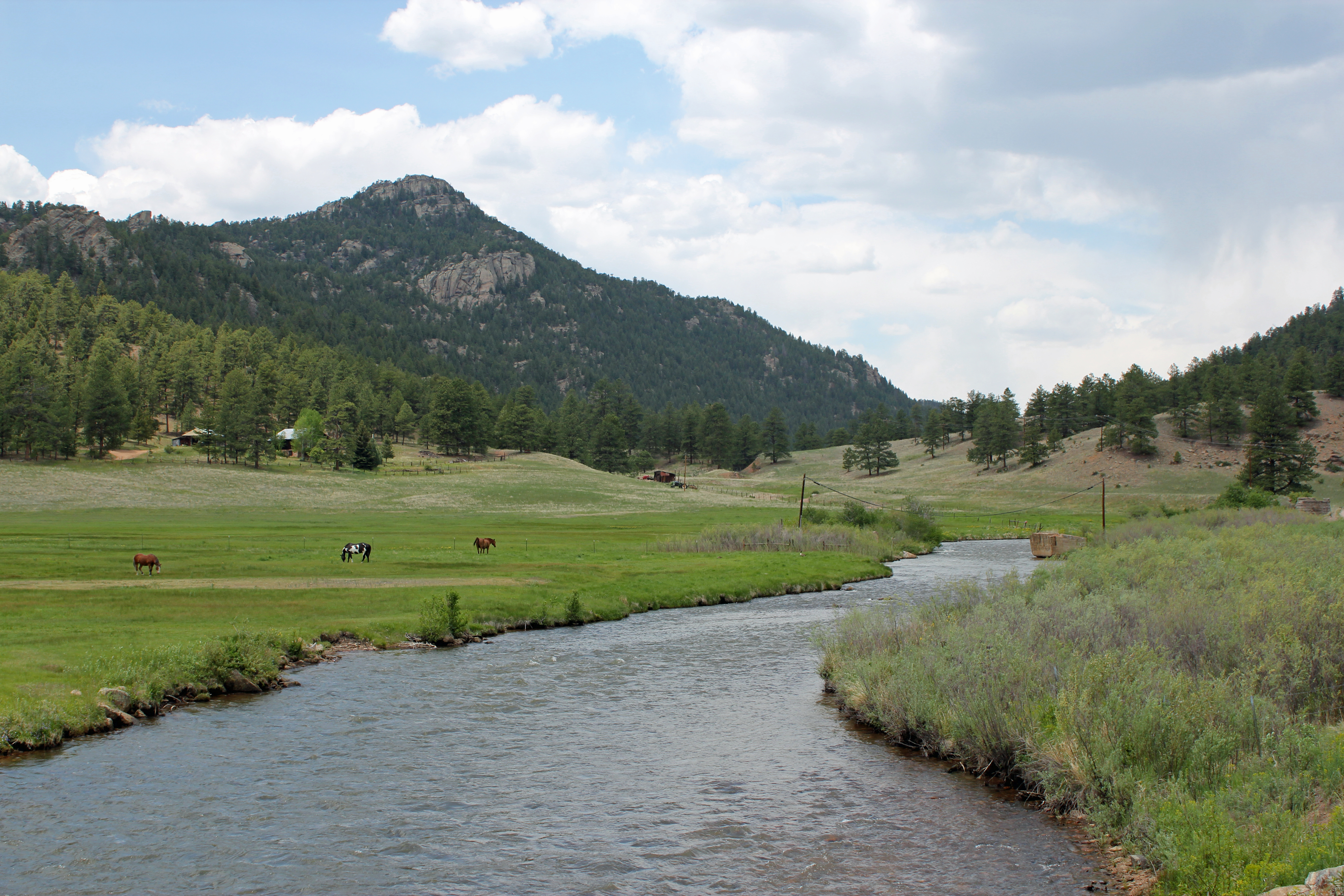
- The river as it passes by Buffalo Creek in Jefferson County.

Physical characteristics
- Source
  - location: Park County, Colorado
  - coordinates: 39°31′03″N 105°51′37″W
- Mouth
  - location: Confluence with South Platte River
  - coordinates: 39°24′28″N 105°10′15″W
  - elevation: 6,096 ft (1,858 m)

Basin features
- Progression: South Platte—Platte— Missouri—Mississippi

The North Fork South Platte River is a tributary of the South Platte River, approximately 50 miles (80 km) long, in central Colorado in the United States. The river is located near the headwaters of the South Platte in the Rocky Mountains southwest of Denver, draining a rugged area of the Front Range just south of the basin of Clear Creek.

The tributary rises at the continental divide near Webster Pass (Colorado) in northwestern Park County, flows through a canyon to the southeast, and is joined by Geneva Creek at the town of Grant. Downstream from Grant it is followed by U.S. Highway 285 until Bailey, where it cuts through a remote section of the foothills. It joins the South Platte from the west at the lower end of the Platte Canyon in the mountains approximately 20 miles (32 km) southwest of Denver. The lower part of the river is flanked by several small mountain communities, including Buffalo Creek and Foxton, in the extended geographic region of the Platte Canyon. The basin of the river is separated from South Park to the south by Kenosha Pass.

== See also ==
- List of rivers of Colorado
