= Grant, Colorado =

Unincorporated community in Colorado, US

- Unincorporated community
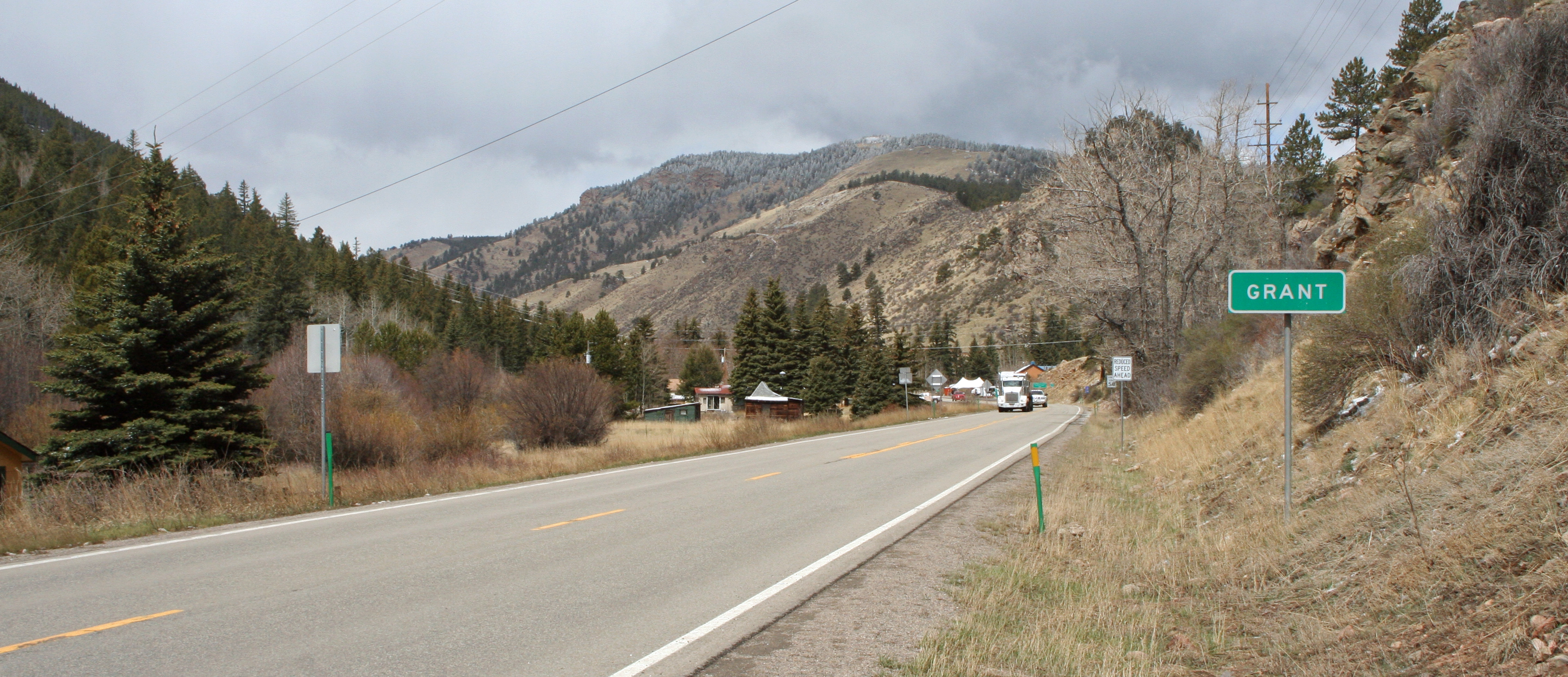
- Approaching Grant from the east on U.S. Route 285, May 2010
- Interactive map of Grant, Colorado
- Coordinates: 39°27′35″N 105°39′42″W
- Country: United States
- State: Colorado
- Counties: Park
- Elevation: 8,606 ft (2,623 m)
- Time zone: UTC-7 (MST)
  - Summer (DST): UTC-6 (MDT)
- ZIP code: 80448
- GNIS feature ID: 204726

Grant is an unincorporated community and a U.S. Post Office in Park County, Colorado, United States.

== Description ==
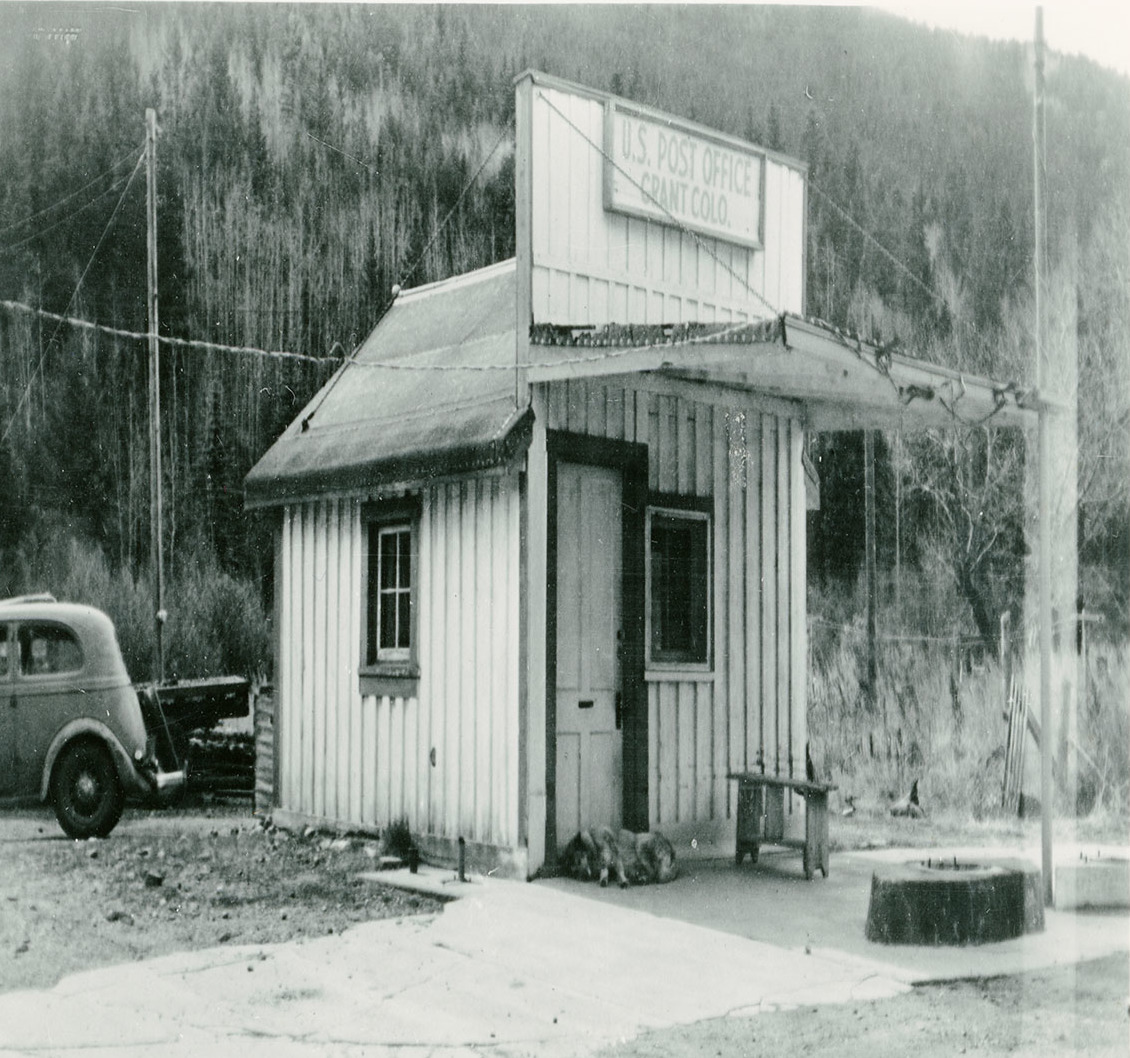
Photograph of the old U.S. Post Office taken in 1880s.

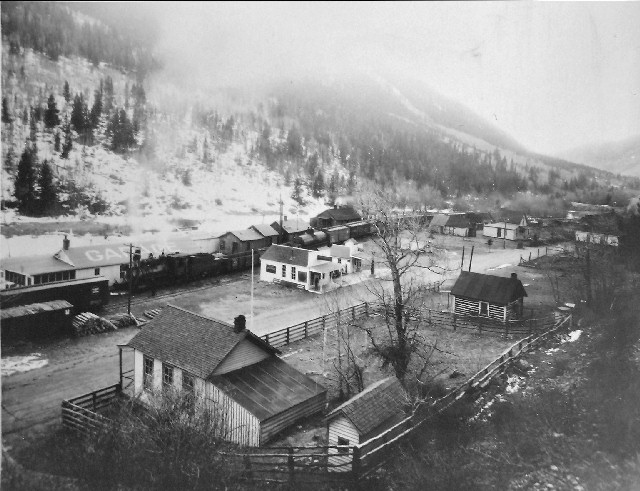
Grant in early 1900s

The community is located in foothills of the Front Range in the upper valley of the North Fork South Platte River, approximately 6 miles (9.7 km) east of Kenosha Pass. It sits along U.S. Route 285 approximately 40 miles (64 km) southwest of Denver. It consists largely of a retired general store, post office, and surrounding houses and trailers along the south side of the highway and along the north side of the river. The Grant Post Office has the ZIP Code 80448. Grant is located at the mouth of Geneva Creek where it descends southward from the Front Range. County Road 62 follows the creek northward to Guanella Pass, leading to Georgetown in the canyon of Clear Creek.

== Climate ==
According to the Köppen Climate Classification system, Grant has a warm-summer humid continental climate, abbreviated "Dfb" on climate maps.

Climate data for Grant, Colorado, 1991–2020 normals, extremes 1963–present
Month	Jan	Feb	Mar	Apr	May	Jun	Jul	Aug	Sep	Oct	Nov	Dec	Year
Record high °F (°C)	58 (14)	58 (14)	66 (19)	76 (24)	82 (28)	90 (32)	89 (32)	88 (31)	84 (29)	77 (25)	67 (19)	58 (14)	90 (32)
Mean maximum °F (°C)	49.2 (9.6)	50.7 (10.4)	59.2 (15.1)	65.7 (18.7)	74.7 (23.7)	82.1 (27.8)	84.2 (29.0)	81.2 (27.3)	77.6 (25.3)	70.5 (21.4)	58.3 (14.6)	49.8 (9.9)	85.0 (29.4)
Mean daily maximum °F (°C)	33.7 (0.9)	35.5 (1.9)	43.3 (6.3)	49.0 (9.4)	59.0 (15.0)	70.4 (21.3)	74.9 (23.8)	72.1 (22.3)	65.8 (18.8)	54.2 (12.3)	41.7 (5.4)	33.1 (0.6)	52.7 (11.5)
Daily mean °F (°C)	21.5 (−5.8)	22.5 (−5.3)	29.8 (−1.2)	35.7 (2.1)	44.5 (6.9)	53.9 (12.2)	59.1 (15.1)	56.9 (13.8)	50.1 (10.1)	39.8 (4.3)	29.1 (−1.6)	21.1 (−6.1)	38.7 (3.7)
Mean daily minimum °F (°C)	9.2 (−12.7)	9.4 (−12.6)	16.3 (−8.7)	22.4 (−5.3)	29.9 (−1.2)	37.5 (3.1)	43.3 (6.3)	41.7 (5.4)	34.5 (1.4)	25.4 (−3.7)	16.5 (−8.6)	9.1 (−12.7)	24.6 (−4.1)
Mean minimum °F (°C)	−8.1 (−22.3)	−7.5 (−21.9)	−0.7 (−18.2)	8.1 (−13.3)	19.5 (−6.9)	29.9 (−1.2)	37.4 (3.0)	35.5 (1.9)	24.9 (−3.9)	10.5 (−11.9)	−1.0 (−18.3)	−8.4 (−22.4)	−13.8 (−25.4)
Record low °F (°C)	−23 (−31)	−30 (−34)	−22 (−30)	−10 (−23)	2 (−17)	20 (−7)	27 (−3)	25 (−4)	7 (−14)	−8 (−22)	−18 (−28)	−27 (−33)	−30 (−34)
Average precipitation inches (mm)	0.56 (14)	0.65 (17)	1.04 (26)	1.50 (38)	1.73 (44)	1.43 (36)	2.58 (66)	2.25 (57)	1.44 (37)	0.96 (24)	0.65 (17)	0.60 (15)	15.39 (391)
Average snowfall inches (cm)	9.9 (25)	10.4 (26)	15.3 (39)	13.8 (35)	4.8 (12)	0.1 (0.25)	0.0 (0.0)	0.0 (0.0)	0.8 (2.0)	5.5 (14)	9.6 (24)	11.8 (30)	82.0 (208)
Average precipitation days (≥ 0.01 in)	6.3	7.1	8.2	8.6	9.5	8.6	14.0	15.0	8.8	6.6	5.6	6.8	105.1
Average snowy days (≥ 0.1 in)	5.7	6.4	7.2	6.0	2.3	0.2	0.0	0.0	0.4	3.1	4.7	6.4	42.4
Source 1: NOAA
Source 2: National Weather Service
