= Trust for Public Land =

Environmental organization in San Francisco, US

- Formation: 1972; 54 years ago
- Founder: Huey Johnson
- Founded at: San Francisco, California, US
- Location: San Francisco, California, US
- President and Chief Executive Officer: Carrie Besnette Hauser
- Website: www.tpl.org

The Trust for Public Land is a U.S. nonprofit organization focused on land conservation and park development. Founded in 1972, the organization works on projects related to the creation of public parks and the protection of open spaces. The organization also conducts research and publishes data related to parks, open space, conservation finance, and urban climate change adaptation.

Headquartered in San Francisco, it operates through multiple field offices across the United States, including a federal affairs presence in Washington, D.C. The Trust for Public Land has completed 5,000 park-creation and land conservation projects across the United States, protected over 4 million acres, and helped pass nearly 700 ballot measures creating $110 billion in voter-approved public funding for parks and open spaces.

== History ==
The Trust for Public Land was founded in San Francisco in 1972 by Huey Johnson, along with a group of lawyers and conservation advocates from the San Francisco Bay Area and elsewhere in the United States.

The organization was established to work on land conservation projects using legal and financial approaches, including efforts related to public access to land and open space. Its early activities also included projects in urban areas.

During the 1970s and 1980s, the organization was involved in programs focused on urban land use, public land transactions, and support for local land conservation groups. These activities included participation in projects associated with the development of parks and protected areas, as well as initiatives to support the formation and training of local land trusts.

== Focus areas ==
The Trust for Public Land works on projects related to urban land use, public parks, and land conservation in the United States. Its activities have included involvement in urban park and open space initiatives in cities such as New York City, Chicago, and Los Angeles. It has also participated in programs related to urban environmental planning and access to public spaces.

The organization has also been involved in projects related to land protection and public access in collaboration with government agencies and other organizations. These have included work associated with national, state, and local parks and protected areas.

As an accredited land trust, the organization operates differently from some traditional land trusts in that it does not typically retain long-term ownership of conservation land. Instead, it works with public agencies, community groups, and other organisations to support the planning, funding, and development of projects, with ownership of land generally transferred to public bodies or partner organisations.

The organization has also participated in activities related to public funding for parks and conservation, including involvement in campaigns and policy initiatives at local, state, and federal levels, sometimes in collaboration with affiliated entities.

== Strategies, programs and initiatives ==
The Trust for Public Land has been involved in programs related to expanding access to public open space, including initiatives focused on parks, trails, playgrounds, and community spaces in urban and suburban areas.

The organization has also participated in the "10-Minute Walk" campaign, a collaborative initiative with the National Recreation and Park Association and the Urban Land Institute. The campaign promotes the goal of increasing access to parks within walking distance in urban areas.

Since its launch in 2017, a number of U.S. mayors have endorsed the initiative through a voluntary pledge.

== Major projects ==
The Trust for Public Land has been involved in a range of land conservation and park development projects across the United States. These have included urban park and open space initiatives such as the Bloomingdale Trail (also known as "The 606") in Chicago, the Atlanta BeltLine, and park developments in cities including San Francisco, Newark, and Los Angeles.

The organization has also participated in projects related to the expansion or protection of public lands, including areas associated with the Appalachian Trail, Yosemite National Park, and Virgin Islands National Park, as well as conservation efforts in regions such as Sonoma County, California, and Orange County, New York.

Additional work has included involvement in projects related to urban redevelopment and open space planning, such as the Queensway project in New York City and other community-based park initiatives.
