= Mount Bierstadt =

Mountain in Colorado, United States

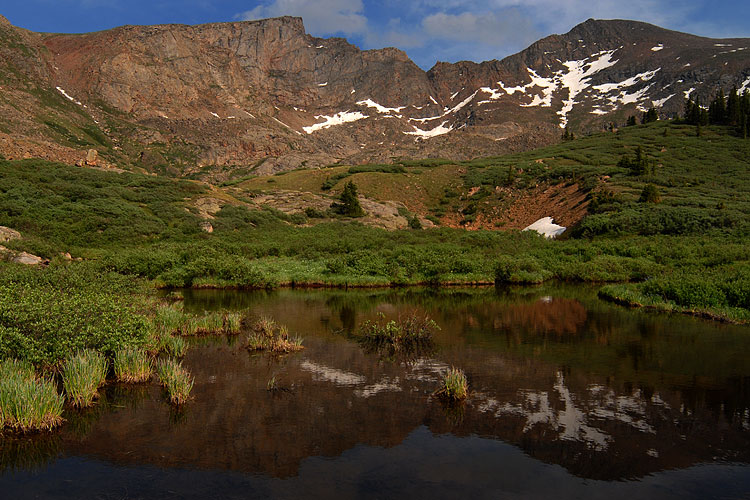
- Reflections of Mount Bierstadt (right) and The Sawtooth (left)

Highest point
- Elevation: 14,064.5 ft (4,286.9 m); NAPGD2022
- Prominence: 720 ft (219 m)
- Isolation: 1.12 mi (1.80 km)
- Listing: Colorado Fourteener 38th
- Coordinates: 39°34′57″N 105°40′08″W

Naming
- Etymology: Albert Bierstadt

Geography
- Location within Colorado
- Location: Clear Creek County, Colorado, United States
- Parent range: Front Range, Colorado Peaks
- Topo map(s): USGS 7.5' topographic map Mount Evans, Colorado

Climbing
- First ascent: 1863 Albert Bierstadt
- Easiest route: West Slopes: Hike, class 2

Mount Bierstadt is a 14,064.5-foot-high (4,287 m) mountain summit in the Front Range of the Rocky Mountains, in the U.S. state of Colorado. The fourteener is located in the Mount Evans Wilderness of Pike National Forest, 9.4 miles (15.1 km) south by east (bearing 171°) of the Town of Georgetown in Clear Creek County. It was named in honor of Albert Bierstadt, a German-American landscape painter who made the first recorded summit of the mountain in 1863.

== Mountain ==
Mount Bierstadt is located 1.4 miles (2.2 km) WSW of Mount Blue Sky and 43.8 miles (70.5 km) WSW of downtown Denver.

Mount Bierstadt is one of the most popular mountains to climb in Colorado due to its proximity to Denver and non-technical reputation. As with most peaks in Colorado, July and August make the best months for climbing Mount Bierstadt.

The most popular base from which to begin ascent of Mount Bierstadt is Guanella Pass, located to the west. From Guanella Pass it is approximately a 7 miles (11 km) hike, with a climb of 2,391 feet (729 m). The trail descends slightly into the fairly level marshlands surrounding Scott Gomer Creek before reaching Bierstadt's western slopes. It then begins a cairn-marked ascent to a relatively flat area just below the main summit block, which is rated Class 2.

Once at the summit, a popular option is to continue the hike to nearby Mount Blue Sky along a ridge known as The Sawtooth, an intermediate-level hike that overlooks Abyss Lake, which occupies the bottom of the valley separating Bierstadt and Blue Sky. This route is rated as class 3.

Albert Bierstadt's painting A Storm in the Rocky Mountains, Mt. Rosalie is based on sketches he made during his 1863 visit to the area. That painting shows either Mount Spalding or Mount Blue Sky (it is ambiguous) from the Chicago Lakes, 3 miles (4.8 km) north-northwest, but Bierstadt and his guide William Byers climbed onward to the summit of either Blue Sky or Spalding (the account is ambiguous).

== Climate ==
Climate data for Mount Bierstadt 39.5812 N, 105.6671 W, Elevation: 13,494 ft (4,113 m) (1991–2020 normals)
| Month | Jan | Feb | Mar | Apr | May | Jun | Jul | Aug | Sep | Oct | Nov | Dec | Year |
|---|---|---|---|---|---|---|---|---|---|---|---|---|---|
| Mean daily maximum °F (°C) | 20.0 (−6.7) | 19.2 (−7.1) | 25.3 (−3.7) | 32.1 (0.1) | 40.5 (4.7) | 51.2 (10.7) | 56.9 (13.8) | 54.3 (12.4) | 48.3 (9.1) | 37.5 (3.1) | 26.8 (−2.9) | 20.2 (−6.6) | 36.0 (2.2) |
| Daily mean °F (°C) | 9.3 (−12.6) | 8.4 (−13.1) | 13.7 (−10.2) | 19.5 (−6.9) | 28.1 (−2.2) | 38.2 (3.4) | 44.2 (6.8) | 42.3 (5.7) | 36.2 (2.3) | 26.1 (−3.3) | 16.5 (−8.6) | 9.8 (−12.3) | 24.4 (−4.2) |
| Mean daily minimum °F (°C) | −1.3 (−18.5) | −2.3 (−19.1) | 2.2 (−16.6) | 6.9 (−13.9) | 15.8 (−9.0) | 25.2 (−3.8) | 31.4 (−0.3) | 30.2 (−1.0) | 24.1 (−4.4) | 14.7 (−9.6) | 6.2 (−14.3) | −0.5 (−18.1) | 12.7 (−10.7) |
| Average precipitation inches (mm) | 3.18 (81) | 3.22 (82) | 3.26 (83) | 4.25 (108) | 3.07 (78) | 1.92 (49) | 3.81 (97) | 3.28 (83) | 2.18 (55) | 2.08 (53) | 2.86 (73) | 2.93 (74) | 36.04 (916) |
Source: PRISM Climate Group

== See also ==
- List of mountain peaks of Colorado
  - List of Colorado fourteeners
