= List of county seats in Colorado =

Coordinates: 38.9972°N 105.5478°W

The location of the State of Colorado in the United States of America.

This is a list of the county seats of the U.S. State of Colorado and its two predecessors: the extralegal Territory of Jefferson and the official Territory of Colorado.

== Territory of Jefferson ==
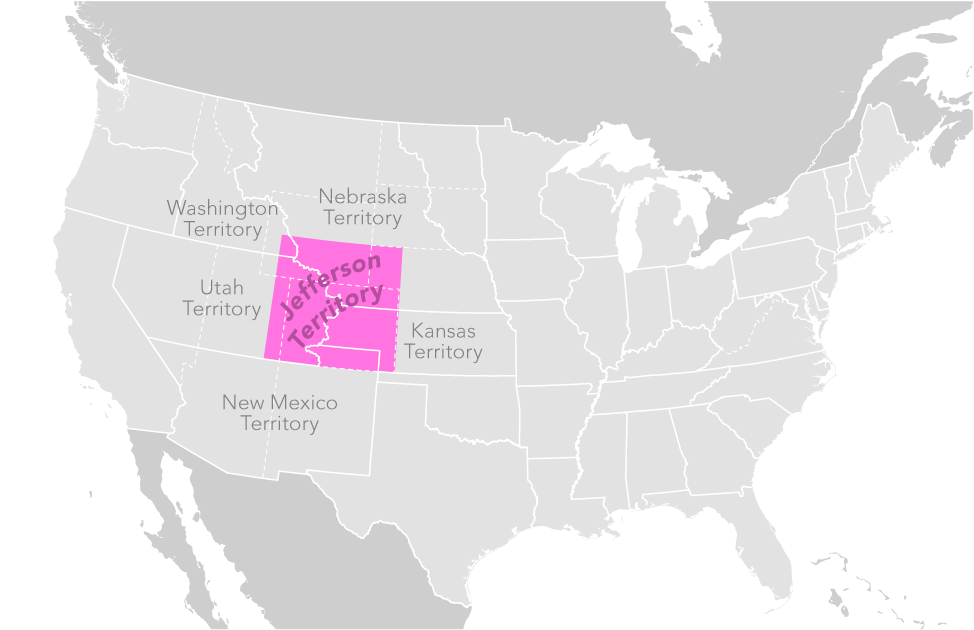
The location of the extralegal Territory of Jefferson in the United States of America in 1859.

On August 24, 1859, voters of the Pike's Peak mining region approved the formation of the Provisional Government of the Territory of Jefferson and designated Denver City as the capital. On November 28, 1859, the territory established 12 counties which served as the de facto local government. The extralegal territory was unable to secure authorization from the United States Congress embroiled in the debate over slavery. On November 13, 1860, the territory moved its capital to Golden City. On February 28, 1861, after seven slave states seceded from the Union, U.S. President James Buchanan signed An Act to provide a temporary Government for the Territory of Colorado. On June 6, 1861, the Jefferson Territory officially yielded to the new Territory of Colorado.

=== The 12 counties of the Territory of Jefferson and their county seats ===
- Arapahoe County‡
  - Denver City (Note: On August 24, 1859, voters of the Pike's Peak mining region approved the formation of the Provisional Government of the Territory of Jefferson with Denver City as the territorial capital. On November 28, 1859, the extralegal territory created 12 counties, with Denver City as the seat of Arapahoe County, Jefferson Territory. On December 3, 1859, the Jefferson Territory granted a charter to the consolidated City of Denver, Auraria, and Highland, still commonly known as Denver City. On November 13, 1860, the Jefferson Territory moved its capital to Golden City. On February 28, 1861, U.S. President James Buchanan signed An Act to provide a temporary Government for the Territory of Colorado, which designated Denver City as the original capital of the Colorado Territory. On June 6, 1861, the Jefferson Territory officially yielded to the new territory. On November 1, 1861, the Colorado Territory created 17 original counties, with Denver City as the original seat of Arapahoe County. On November 7, 1861, the Colorado Territory reincorporated the city as the City of Denver City. On July 7, 1862, the Colorado Territory moved its capital to Colorado City. On February 13, 1866, the city shortened its name to the City of Denver. Denver served again as the capital of the Colorado Territory from December 9, 1867, until statehood on August 1, 1876, when Denver became the (first and only) capital of the State of Colorado. The City and County of Denver was consolidated on December 1, 1902.) (⁂Territorial capital August 24, 1859, to November 13, 1860)
- Cheyenne County‡
  - No county seat designated.
- El Paso County‡
  - Colorado City (Note: On November 28, 1859, the Provisional Government of the Territory of Jefferson created 12 counties, with Colorado City as the seat of El Paso County, Jefferson Territory. On November 1, 1861, the new Territory of Colorado created 17 original counties, with Colorado City as the original seat of El Paso County, Colorado Territory. Colorado City served as the second capital of the Colorado Territory from July 7, 1862, until August 14, 1862. In 1873, county voters moved the county seat to Colorado Springs. On June 10, 1917, the City of Colorado Springs annexed Colorado City.)
- Fountain County‡
  - Pueblo (Note: On November 28, 1859, the Provisional Government of the Territory of Jefferson created 12 counties, with Pueblo as the seat of Fountain County, Jefferson Territory. On November 1, 1861, the new Territory of Colorado created 17 original counties, with Pueblo as the seat of Pueblo County, Colorado Territory, and since statehood on August 1, 1876, the seat of Pueblo County, Colorado.)
- Heele County‡
  - La Porte (Note: On November 28, 1859, the Provisional Government of the Territory of Jefferson created 12 counties, with La Porte as the seat of Heele County, Jefferson Territory. On November 1, 1861, the new Territory of Colorado created 17 original counties, with La Porte as the original seat of Larimer County, Colorado Territory, serving until 1868. On December 21, 1894, La Porte changed its name to Laporte.)
- Jackson County‡
  - Boulder City (Note: On November 28, 1859, the Provisional Government of the Territory of Jefferson created 12 counties, with Boulder City as the seat of Jackson County, Jefferson Territory. On November 1, 1861, the new Territory of Colorado created 17 original counties, with Boulder City as the seat of Boulder County, Colorado Territory, and since statehood on August 1, 1876, Boulder has been the seat of Boulder County, Colorado.)
- Jefferson County‡
  - Arapahoe City/Arapahoe (Note: On November 28, 1859, the Provisional Government of the Territory of Jefferson created 12 counties, with Arapahoe City as the first seat of Jefferson County, Jefferson Territory. On January 17, 1860, Arapahoe City shortened its name to Arapahoe. On November 6, 1860, the Jefferson Territory moved the seat of Jefferson County to Golden City.) – November 28, 1859, to November 6, 1860
  - Golden City (Note: On November 6, 1860, the Provisional Government of the Territory of Jefferson designated Golden City as the new seat of Jefferson County, Jefferson Territory, and seven days later, it designated Golden City as its new territorial capital. On November 1, 1861, the new Territory of Colorado created 17 original counties, with Golden City as the seat of Jefferson County, Colorado Territory. Golden City served as the third capital of the Territory of Colorado from August 14, 1862, until December 9, 1867. The City of Golden City, Colorado Territory, was incorporated on January 2, 1871. On June 27, 1876, Golden City shortened its name to Golden, and since statehood on August 1 of that year, Golden has been the seat of Jefferson County, Colorado.) – November 6, 1860, to June 6, 1861 (⁂Territorial capital November 13, 1860, to June 6, 1861)
- Mountain County‡
  - Central City (Note: On November 28, 1859, the Provisional Government of the Territory of Jefferson created 12 counties, with Central City as the seat of Mountain County, Jefferson Territory. On November 1, 1861, the new Territory of Colorado created 17 original counties, with Central City as the seat of Gilpin County, Colorado Territory, and since statehood on August 1, 1876, the seat of Gilpin County, Colorado.)
- North County‡
  - No county seat designated.
- Park County‡
  - Tarryall City/Tarryall (Note: On November 28, 1859, the Provisional Government of the Territory of Jefferson created 12 counties, with Tarryall City as the seat of Park County, Jefferson Territory. On January 4, 1860, Tarryall City shortened its name to Tarryall. On November 1, 1861, the new Territory of Colorado created 17 original counties, with Tarryall as the original seat of Park County, Colorado Territory, serving until January 7, 1862.)
- St. Vrain's County‡
  - Saint Vrain (Note: On November 28, 1859, the Provisional Government of the Territory of Jefferson created 12 counties, with Saint Vrain as the seat of St. Vrain County, Jefferson Territory. On November 1, 1861, the new Territory of Colorado created 17 original counties, with Saint Vrain as the original seat of Weld County, Colorado Territory, serving until 1868.)
- Saratoga County‡
  - Breckenridge/Breckinridge (Note: On November 28, 1859, the Provisional Government of the Territory of Jefferson created 12 counties, with Breckenridge as the seat of Saratoga County, Jefferson Territory. On January 18, 1860, the spelling of the town's name was changed to Breckinridge in honor of U.S. Vice President John Cabell Breckinridge. On December 2, 1861, after John Breckinridge accepted a commission as a brigadier general in the Confederate States Army, the town changed its name back to the original Breckenridge. In 1862, county voters selected Breckenridge as the new seat of Summit County, Colorado Territory, and since statehood on August 1, 1876, the seat of Summit County, Colorado.)

== Territory and State of Colorado ==

The 64 counties of the U.S. State of Colorado

The free Territory of Colorado was officially organized on February 28, 1861. On November 1, 1861, the Colorado Territory created 17 original counties: Arapahoe, Boulder, Clear Creek, Costilla, Douglas, El Paso, Fremont, Gilpin, Guadalupe, Huerfano, Jefferson, Lake, Larimer, Park, Pueblo, Summit, and Weld; plus the Cheyenne and Arapaho Reserve. The Colorado Territory later added 12 more counties for a total of 29, of which 26 still exist.

On August 1, 1876, U.S. President Ulysses S. Grant issued Proclamation 230: Admission of Colorado into the Union. The State of Colorado has created 41 counties of which 38 still exist, for a total of 64 existing counties.

=== The 64 current and six extinct counties of Colorado and their county seats ===
- Adams County (November 15, 1902 to present)
  - Brighton (Note: Brighton has been the seat of Adams County, Colorado since the county was created on November 15, 1902.)
- Alamosa County (March 8, 1913 to present)
  - Alamosa (Note: Alamosa has been the seat of Alamosa County, Colorado since the county was created on March 8, 1913.)
- Arapahoe County (Note: The name of Arapahoe County was changed to South Arapahoe County for the 15 months from November 15, 1902 to April 11, 1903.) (November 1, 1861 to November 15, 1902; and April 11, 1903, to present)
  - Denver City/Denver (⁂Territorial capital February 28, 1861, to July 7, 1862, and December 9, 1867, to August 1, 1876; # state capital since August 1, 1876)
    - Between November 15 and December 1, 1902, Arapahoe County was split into the City and County of Denver, Adams County; and South Arapahoe County. On April 11, 1903, the name of South Arapahoe County was changed back to Arapahoe County.
  - Littleton (Note: Voters selected Littleton as the seat of South Arapahoe County, Colorado, which was renamed and re-created on November 15, 1902. Littleton has remained the seat since the county name was changed back to Arapahoe County, Colorado on April 11, 1903.) – April 11, 1903 to present
- Archuleta County (April 14, 1885 to present)
  - Pagosa Springs (Note: Pagosa Springs has been the seat of Archuleta County, Colorado since the county was created on April 14, 1885.)
- Baca County (April 16, 1889 to present)
  - Springfield (Note: Springfield has been the seat of Baca County, Colorado since the county was created on April 16, 1889.)
- Bent County (February 11, 1870 to present)
  - Las Animas (east) (Note: On February 11, 1870, the Territory of Colorado created Bent County, Colorado Territory, with Las Animas serving as the original county seat for only a few months. Las Animas served as county seat again from 1872 until 1875, when the county seat was moved to West Las Animas. With statehood on August 1, 1876, West Las Animas became the seat of Bent County, Colorado. On September 4, 1886, West Las Animas changed its name to Las Animas, and Las Animas has served as the county seat since.) – February 11, 1870 to 1870
  - Boggsville (Note: Boggsville served as the seat of Bent County, Colorado Territory from 1870 until 1872.) – 1870 to 1872
  - Las Animas (east) – 1872 to 1875
  - West Las Animas/Las Animas – 1875 to present
- Boulder County (November 1, 1861 to present)
  - Boulder City/Boulder
- City and County of Broomfield (Note: The City and County of Broomfield was consolidated on November 15, 2001.) (November 15, 2001 to present)
  - Broomfield
- Carbonate County‡ (Note: On February 8, 1879, the state changed the name of Lake County, Colorado to Carbonate County for two days. On February 10, 1879, the state split Carbonate County into a new Chaffee County and a re-created Lake County.) (February 8, 1879 to February 10, 1879)
  - Granite (Note: In 1868, county voters selected Granite as the new seat of Lake County, Colorado Territory, and after statehood on August 1, 1876, the seat of Lake County, Colorado. On February 8, 1879, the state changed the name of Lake County to Carbonate County for just two days. After two days, the state created Chaffee County, Colorado and designated Granite as the original county seat, serving until 1888.)
- Chaffee County (February 10, 1879 to present)
  - Granite – February 10, 1879 to 1888
  - Buena Vista (Note: Buena Vista served as the seat of Chaffee County, Colorado from 1888 until 1928.) – 1888 to 1928
  - Salida (Note: On March 28, 1881, Arkansas changed its name to Salida. Salida has served as the seat of Chaffee County, Colorado since 1928.) – 1928 to present
- Cheyenne County (March 25, 1889 to present)
  - Cheyenne Wells (Note: Cheyenne Wells has been the seat of Cheyenne County, Colorado since the county was created on March 25, 1889.)
- Clear Creek County (November 1, 1861 to present)
  - Idaho (Note: On November 1, 1861, the Territory of Colorado created 17 original counties, with Idaho as the original seat of Clear Creek County, Colorado Territory, serving until 1867. On April 7, 1876, Idaho changed its name to Idaho Springs.) - November 1, 1861 to 1867
  - Georgetown (Note: In 1867, county voters selected Georgetown as the new seat of Clear Creek County, Colorado Territory, and since statehood on August 1, 1876, the seat of Clear Creek County, Colorado.) – 1867 to present
- Conejos County (Note: Created by the Territory of Colorado as one of its original 17 counties on November 1, 1861, the name of Guadaloupe County was changed to Conejos County after only six days.) (November 7, 1861 to present)
  - Guadaloupe (Note: On November 1, 1861, the Territory of Colorado created 17 original counties, with Guadaloupe as the original seat of Guadaloupe County, Colorado Territory. After only six days, the territory changed the name of the county to Conejos County, and Guadaloupe continued to serve as county seat until 1863.) - November 7, 1861 to 1863
  - Conejos (Note: In 1863, county voters selected Conejos as the seat of Conejos County, Colorado Territory, and since statehood on August 1, 1876, the seat of Conejos County, Colorado. Conejos is the only remaining unincorporated county seat in Colorado.) - 1863 to present
- Costilla County (November 1, 1861 to present)
  - San Miguel/Costilla (Note: On November 1, 1861, the Territory of Colorado created 17 original counties, with San Miguel as the original seat of Costilla County, Colorado Territory. When its post office opened on November 13, 1862, the village selected the new name Costilla, perhaps in recognition of its new status. In 1863, county voters decided to move the county seat 17 miles (27 km) north to San Luis. In 1869, a U.S. government survey determined that Costilla was actually located in Taos County, New Mexico Territory. It wasn't until October 21, 1872, that the village post office was officially renamed Costilla, New Mexico Territory.) – November 1, 1861 to 1863
  - San Luis (Note: San Luis de la Culebra was settled on April 9, 1851. In 1863, county voters selected San Luis as the new seat of Costilla County, Colorado Territory, and since statehood on August 1, 1876, the seat of Costilla County, Colorado. San Luis is the oldest continuously occupied community in Colorado.) – 1863 to present
- Crowley County (May 29, 1911 to present)
  - Ordway (Note: Ordway has been the seat of Crowley County, Colorado since the county was created on May 29, 1911.)
- Custer County (March 9, 1877 to present)
  - Ula (Note: Ula served as the original seat of Custer County, Colorado since the county was created on March 9, 1877, until 1878.) – March 9, 1877 to 1878
  - Rosita (Note: Rosita served as the seat of Custer County, Colorado from 1878 until 1886.) – 1878 to 1886
  - Silver Cliff (Note: Silver Cliff served as the seat of Custer County, Colorado from 1886 until 1928.) – 1886 to 1928
  - Westcliffe (Note: Westcliffe has served as the seat of Custer County, Colorado since 1928.) – 1928 to present
- Delta County (February 11, 1883 to present)
  - Delta (Note: Delta has been the seat of Delta County, Colorado since the county was created on February 11, 1883.)
- City and County of Denver (December 1, 1902 to present)
  - Denver (# State capital since August 1, 1876)
- Dolores County (March 4, 1881 to present)
  - Rico (Note: Rico served as the original seat of Dolores County, Colorado since the county was created on March 4, 1881, until 1945.) – March 4, 1881 to 1945
  - Dove Creek (Note: Dove Creek has served as the seat of Dolores County, Colorado since 1945.) – 1945 to present
- Douglas County (November 1, 1861 to present)
  - Frankstown (Note: On November 1, 1861, the Territory of Colorado created 17 original counties, with Frankstown as the original seat of Douglas County, Colorado Territory. In 1864, the county seat and its post office moved 3 miles (5 km) south to the California Ranch stage stop, which took the name Franktown. Franktown served as the county seat until 1874.) – November 1, 1861 to 1864
  - California Ranch/Franktown – 1864 to 1874
  - Castle Rock (Note: In 1874, county voters selected Castle Rock as the new seat of Douglas County, Colorado Territory, and since statehood on August 1, 1876, the seat of Douglas County, Colorado.) – 1874 to present
- Eagle County (February 11, 1883 to present)
  - Red Cliff/Redcliff (Note: Red Cliff served as the original seat of Eagle County, Colorado since the county was created on February 11, 1883, until 1921. Red Cliff changed its name to Redcliff on February 7, 1895; then changed it back to Red Cliff on April 1, 1979.) – February 11, 1883 to 1921
  - Eagle (Note: Castle changed its name to Eagle on September 3, 1891. Eagle has served as the seat of Eagle County, Colorado since 1921.) – 1921 to present
- El Paso County (November 1, 1861 to present)
  - Colorado City – November 1, 1861 to 1873 (⁂Territorial capital July 7, 1862, to August 14, 1862)
  - Colorado Springs (Note: In 1873, county voters selected Colorado Springs as the new seat of El Paso County, Colorado Territory, and since statehood on August 1, 1876, the seat of El Paso County, Colorado.) – 1873 to present
- Elbert County (February 2, 1874 to present)
  - Kiowa (Note: On February 2, 1874, the Territory of Colorado created Elbert County, Colorado Territory, with Kiowa as the county seat, and since statehood on August 1, 1876, the seat of Elbert County, Colorado.)
- Fremont County (November 1, 1861 to present)
  - Cañon City (Note: On November 1, 1861, the new Territory of Colorado created 17 original counties, with Cañon City as the seat of Fremont County, Colorado Territory, and since statehood on August 1, 1876, the seat of Fremont County, Colorado. Cañon City has also been spelled Canon City and Canyon City.)
- Garfield County (February 10, 1883 to present)
  - Carbonate (Note: Carbonate served as the original seat of Garfield County, Colorado for several months after the county was created on February 10, 1883.) – February 10, 1883 to 1883
  - Barlow/Glenwood Springs (Note: On June 25, 1883, Defiance changed its name to Barlow, and several months later, county voters selected Barlow as the new seat of Garfield County, Colorado. On March 28, 1884, Barlow changed its name to Glenwood Springs, and Glenwood Springs continues to serve as county seat.) – 1883 to present
- Gilpin County (November 1, 1861 to present)
  - Central City
- Grand County (February 2, 1874 to present)
  - Hot Sulphur Springs (Note: Hot Sulphur Springs served as the original seat of Grand County, Colorado Territory since the county was created on February 2, 1874, and with statehood on August 1, 1876, the seat of Grand County, Colorado until 1882 and then again from 1888 to present. On June 26, 1894, Hot Sulphur Springs changed its name to Sulphur Springs, then changed it back to Hot Sulphur Springs on February 15, 1912.) – February 2, 1874 to 1882
  - Grand Lake (Note: Grand Lake served as the seat of Grand County, Colorado from 1882 until 1888. On June 30, 1895, Grand Lake changed its name to Grandlake; then changed it back to Grand Lake on April 1, 1938.) – 1882 to 1888
  - Hot Sulphur Springs/Sulphur Springs/Hot Sulphur Springs – 1888 to present
- Greenwood County‡ (Note: Greenwood County, Colorado Territory, existed for the four years from February 11, 1870, until February 6, 1874.) (February 11, 1870 to February 6, 1874)
  - Kit Carson (Note: Kit Carson served as the seat of Greenwood County, Colorado Territory, for the four years it existed from February 11, 1870, until February 6, 1874.)
- Guadaloupe County‡ (November 1, 1861 until renamed Conejos County six days later)
  - Guadaloupe
- Gunnison County (March 9, 1877 to present)
  - Gunnison (Note: Gunnison has been the seat of Gunnison County, Colorado since the county was created on March 9, 1877.)
- Hinsdale County (February 10, 1874 to present)
  - San Juan City/San Juan (Note: San Juan City served as the original seat of Hinsdale County, Colorado Territory from February 10, 1874, when the county was created, until February 23, 1875. On June 4, 1874, San Juan City officially shortened its name to San Juan, although it was still commonly known as San Juan City. Mineral County, Colorado was created on March 27, 1893, and San Juan City became a part of Mineral County.) – February 10, 1874 to February 23, 1875
  - Lake City (Note: In 1875, county voters selected Lake City as the new seat of Hinsdale County, Colorado Territory, and since statehood on August 1, 1876, the seat of Hinsdale County, Colorado.) – February 23, 1875 to present
- Huerfano County (November 1, 1861 to present)
  - Autobees Plaza (Note: On November 1, 1861, the Territory of Colorado created 17 original counties, with Autobees Plaza as the original seat of Huerfano County, Colorado Territory, serving until 1868.) – November 1, 1861 to 1868
  - Badito (Note: On September 12, 1865, Little Orphan changed its name to Badito. Badito served as the seat of Huerfano County, Colorado Territory from 1868 until 1874.) – 1868 to 1874
  - Walsenburgh/Tourist/Walsenburgh/Walsenburg (Note: In 1874, county voters selected Walsenburgh as the new seat of Huerfano County, Colorado Territory, and since statehood on August 1, 1876, the seat of Huerfano County, Colorado. On October 20, 1887, Walsenburgh changed its name to Tourist; then changed it back Walsenburgh on November 29, 1887; then shortened it to Walsenburg on December 22, 1892.) – 1874 to present
- Jackson County (May 5, 1909 to present)
  - Walden (Note: Walden has been the seat of Jackson County, Colorado since the county was created on May 5, 1909.)
- Jefferson County (November 1, 1861 to present)
  - Golden City/Golden (⁂Territorial capital August 14, 1862, to December 9, 1867)
- Kiowa County (April 11, 1889 to present)
  - Sheridan Lake (Note: On September 20, 1887, Bee changed its name to Sheridan Lake; then changed it back to Bee on October 15, 1887; then changed it back again to Sheridan Lake on October 27, 1887. Sheridan Lake served as the original seat of Kiowa County, Colorado since the county was created on April 11, 1889, until 1902.) – April 11, 1889 to 1902
  - Eads (Note: Eads has served as the seat of Kiowa County, Colorado since 1902.) – 1902 to present
- Kit Carson County (April 11, 1889 to present)
  - Burlington (Note: Burlington has been the seat of Kit Carson County, Colorado since the county was created on April 11, 1889.)
- La Plata County (February 10, 1874 to present)
  - Howardsville (Note: Howardsville served as the original seat of La Plata County, Colorado Territory since the county was created on February 10, 1874, until January 31, 1876.) – February 10, 1874 to January 31, 1876
  - Parrott City (Note: On January 31, 1876, county voters selected Parrott City as the new seat of La Plata County, Colorado Territory, and after statehood on August 1, 1876, the seat of La Plata County, Colorado until 1881.) – January 31, 1876 to 1881
  - Durango (Note: Durango has served as the seat of La Plata County, Colorado since 1881.) – 1881 to present
- Lake County (November 1, 1861 to February 8, 1879; and February 10, 1879, to present)
  - Oro City (Note: On November 1, 1861, the Territory of Colorado created 17 original counties, with Oro City as the original seat of Lake County, Colorado Territory, serving until 1866.) – November 1, 1861 to 1866
  - Dayton (Note: Dayton served as the seat of Lake County, Colorado Territory from 1866 until 1868.) – 1866 to 1868
  - Granite – 1868 to February 8, 1879
    - Lake County was renamed Carbonate County for two days before being split into a new Chaffee County and a re-created Lake County.
  - Leadville (Note: Leadville has served as the seat of Lake County, Colorado since it was re-created on February 10, 1879.) – February 10, 1879 to present
- Larimer County (November 1, 1861 to present)
  - La Porte – November 1, 1861 to 1868
  - Fort Collins (Note: In 1868, county voters selected Fort Collins as the new seat of Larimer County, Colorado Territory, and since statehood on August 1, 1876, the seat of Larimer County, Colorado.) – 1868 to present
- Las Animas County (February 9, 1866 to present)
  - Trinidad (Note: On February 9, 1866, the Territory of Colorado created Las Animas County, Colorado Territory with Trinidad as its seat until statehood on August 1, 1876, when it became the seat of Las Animas County, Colorado.)
- Lincoln County (April 11, 1889 to present)
  - Hugo (Note: Hugo has been the seat of Lincoln County, Colorado since the county was created on April 11, 1889.)
- Logan County - February 25, 1887 to present)
  - Sterling (Note: Sterling has been the seat of Logan County, Colorado since the county was created on February 25, 1887.)
- Mesa County (February 14, 1883 to present)
  - Grand Junction (Note: On May 26, 1882, Ute changed its name to Grand Junction. Grand Junction has been the seat of Mesa County, Colorado since the county was created on February 11, 1883.)
- Mineral County - (March 27, 1893 to present)
  - Wason (Note: Wason served eight months as the original seat of Mineral County, Colorado, from the creation of the county on March 27, 1893, until November 7 that year.) – March 27, 1893 to November 7, 1893
  - Amethyst/Creede (Note: In 1892, two rival municipalities named Creede were incorporated adjacent to one another in the Creede Mining District. On March 19, 1892, the Town of Creede was incorporated in the area around the Creede post office. On June 13, 1892, the rival City of Creede was incorporated in the area around the Amethyst post office. On March 27, 1893, the Colorado legislature created Mineral County from portions of Hinsdale, Saguache, and Rio Grande counties. The legislature initially named the Wason camp as the original seat of the new county, but on November 7, 1893, county voters selected the City of Creede as the Mineral County Seat instead. However, the City of Creede continued to use its Amethyst postal address. In an attempt to avoid further confusion, the United States Post Office Department changed the name of the Creede post office to North Creede, Colorado, on November 28 1908, and changed the name of the Amethyst post office to Creede, Colorado, on February 9, 1909. As silver mining declined, both municipalities lost population, and in 1916, the City of Creede became a statutory town, but continued to use the appellation City of Creede to distinguish itself from its northern rival. On April 15, 1919, the North Creede post office closed, and the Town of Creede soon ceased operation. It was not until July 23, 2026, that the Colorado Secretary of State declared the Town of Creede abandoned. The Geographic Names Information System (GNIS) uses the name "Town of the City of Creede" to identify the county seat and sole surviving municipality of Mineral County.) – November 7, 1893 to present
- Moffat County (February 27, 1911 to present)
  - Craig (Note: On August 28, 1889, Yampa changed its name to Craig. Craig has been the seat of Moffat County, Colorado since the county was created on February 27, 1911.)
- Montezuma County (April 16, 1889 to present)
  - Cortez (Note: Cortez has been the seat of Montezuma County, Colorado since the county was created on April 16, 1889.)
- Montrose County (February 11, 1883 to present)
  - Montrose (Note: Montrose has been the seat of Montrose County, Colorado since the county was created on February 11, 1883.)
- Morgan County (February 19, 1889 to present)
  - Fort Morgan (Note: Fort Morgan has been the seat of Morgan County, Colorado since the county was created on February 19, 1889.)
- Otero County (March 25, 1889 to present)
  - La Junta (Note: La Junta has been the seat of Otero County, Colorado since the county was created on March 25, 1889.)
- Ouray County (Note: The name of Ouray County, Colorado was changed to Uncompahgre County for the three days from February 27 to March 2, 1883.) (January 18, 1877 to February 27, 1883; and March 2, 1883, to present)
  - Ouray (Note: Ouray has been the seat of Ouray County, Colorado since the county was created on January 18, 1877, although the name of the county was changed to Uncompahgre County for the three days from February 27 to March 2, 1883.)
- Park County (November 1, 1861 to present)
  - Tarryall City/Tarryall – November 1, 1861 to January 7, 1862
  - Laurette/Bucksin/Buckskin Joe (Note: On January 7, 1862, county voters selected Laurette as the new seat of Park County, Colorado Territory. On December 21, 1865, Laurette changed its name to Buckskin, commonly known as Buckskin Joe. Buckskin Joe served as county seat until November 7, 1867.) – January 7, 1862 to November 7, 1867
  - Fair Play/Fairplay (Note: On November 7, 1867, county voters selected Fair Play as the new seat of Park County, Colorado Territory, and since statehood on August 1, 1876, the seat of Park County, Colorado. On October 1, 1924, Fair Play changed its name to Fairplay, and has continued to serve as county seat.) – November 7, 1867 to present
- Phillips County (March 27, 1889 to present)
  - Holyoke (Note: Holyoke has been the seat of Phillips County, Colorado since the county was created on March 27, 1889.)
- Pitkin County (February 23, 1881 to present)
  - Aspen (Note: Aspen has been the seat of Pitkin County, Colorado since the county was created on February 23, 1881.)
- Platte County‡ (February 9, 1872 to February 9, 1874)
  - Platte County failed to organize and reverted to the eastern portion of Weld County.
- Prowers County (April 11, 1889 to present)
  - Lamar (Note: Lamar has been the seat of Prowers County, Colorado since the county was created on April 11, 1889.)
- Pueblo County (November 1, 1861 to present)
  - Pueblo
- Rio Blanco County (March 25, 1889 to present)
  - Meeker (Note: Meeker has been the seat of Rio Blanco County, Colorado since the county was created on March 25, 1889.)
- Rio Grande County (February 10, 1874 to present)
  - Del Norte (Note: On February 10, 1874, the Territory of Colorado created Rio Grande County, Colorado Territory with Del Norte as the original county seat, until statehood on August 1, 1876, when Del Norte became the seat of Rio Grande County, Colorado.)
- Routt County (January 29, 1877 to present)
  - Hayden (Note: On January 29, 1877, the state created Routt County, Colorado and designated Hayden as the original county seat. Hayden served as county seat until 1878.) – January 29, 1877 to 1878
  - Hahns Peak (Note: Hahns Peak served as the seat of Routt County, Colorado from 1878 until 1912.) – 1878 to 1912
  - Steamboat Springs (Note: Steamboat Springs has served as the seat of Routt County, Colorado since 1912.) – 1912 to present
- Saguache County (Note: The name "Saguache" is pronounced /səˈwætʃ/. This name comes from the Ute language noun "sawup" /səˈwʌp/ meaning "sand dunes". The Spanish language version of this name is usually spelled "Saguache", while the English language version is usually spelled "Sawatch".) (December 29, 1866 to present)
  - Saguache (Note: On December 29, 1866, the Territory of Colorado created Saguache County, Colorado Territory with Saguache as the county seat, and since statehood on August 1, 1876, the seat of Saguache County, Colorado.)
- San Juan County (January 31, 1876 to present)
  - Silverton (Note: On January 31, 1876, the Territory of Colorado created San Juan County, Colorado Territory with Silverton as the county seat, and since statehood on August 1 of that year, the seat of San Juan County, Colorado.)
- San Miguel County (March 2, 1883 to present)
  - Columbia/Telluride (Note: The Telluride, Colorado, post office opened on July 26, 1880, at the town of Columbia, a name not acceptable to the United States Post Office Department. Columbia (Telluride since 1887) has been the seat of San Miguel County, Colorado, since the county was created on March 2, 1883. The Town of Columbia was incorporated on February 10, 1887, but the town changed its name to the Town of Telluride a few months later.)
- Sedgwick County (April 9, 1889 to present)
  - Julesburg (Note: On May 26, 1886, Denver Junction changed its name to Julesburg. Julesburg has been the seat of Sedgwick County, Colorado since the county was created on April 9, 1889.)
- South Arapahoe County‡ (November 15, 1902 to April 11, 1903)
  - Littleton
- Summit County (November 1, 1861 to present)
  - Parkville (Note: On November 1, 1861, the Territory of Colorado created 17 original counties, with Parkville as the original seat of Summit County, Colorado Territory. Parkville served as county seat until the following year.) – November 1, 1861 to 1862
  - Breckenridge – 1862 to present
- Teller County (March 23, 1899 to present)
  - Cripple Creek (Note: Fremont changed its name to Morland on December 9, 1891; then changed it back to Fremont on February 4, 1892; then changed it to Cripple Creek on June 20, 1892. Cripple Creek has been the seat of Teller County, Colorado since the county was created on March 23, 1899.)
- Uncompahgre County‡ (February 27, 1883 to March 2, 1883)
  - Ouray
- Washington County (February 9, 1887 to present)
  - Akron (Note: Akron has been the seat of Washington County, Colorado since the county was created on February 9, 1887.)
- Weld County (November 1, 1861 to present)
  - Saint Vrain – November 1, 1861 to 1868
  - Latham (Note: On November 25, 1863, Cherokee City changed its name to Latham. Latham served as the seat of Weld County, Colorado Territory from 1868 until 1870.) – 1868 to 1870
  - Evans (Note: Evans served as the seat of Weld County, Colorado Territory from 1870 until 1874 and again from 1875 until statehood on August 1, 1876, when it became the seat of Weld County, Colorado until the following year.) – 1870 to 1874
  - Greeley (Note: Greeley served as the seat of Weld County, Colorado Territory from 1874 until 1875. Greeley has served as the seat of Weld County, Colorado since 1877.) – 1874 to 1875
  - Evans – 1875 to 1877
  - Greeley – 1877 to present
- Yuma County (March 15, 1889 to present)
  - Yuma (Note: Yuma served as the original seat of Yuma County, Colorado from the creation of the county on March 15, 1889, until 1902.) – March 15, 1889 to 1902
  - Wray (Note: Wray has served as the seat of Yuma County, Colorado since 1902.) – 1902 to present

== Table of county seats ==
Visual guide
Current county seat
Historic county seat
State capital #
Historic territorial capital ⁂
Extinct county *

Current and Historical Colorado County Seats
County seat	County	Beginning	End
Akron	Washington County, Colorado	February 9, 1887	present
Alamosa	Alamosa County, Colorado	March 8, 1913	present
Arapahoe City Arapahoe	Jefferson County, Jefferson Territory *	November 28, 1859	November 6, 1860
Aspen	Pitkin County, Colorado	February 23, 1881	present
Autobees Plaza	Huerfano County, Colorado Territory	November 1, 1861	1868
Badito	Huerfano County, Colorado Territory	1868	1874
Boggsville	Bent County, Colorado Territory	1870	1872
Boulder City Boulder	Jackson County, Jefferson Territory *	November 28, 1859	June 6, 1861
Boulder City Boulder	Boulder County, Colorado Territory; Boulder County, Colorado	November 1, 1861	present
Breckenridge Breckinridge Breckenridge	Saratoga County, Jefferson Territory *	November 28, 1859	June 6, 1861
Breckenridge Breckinridge Breckenridge	Summit County, Colorado Territory; Summit County, Colorado	1862	present
Brighton	Adams County, Colorado	November 15, 1902	present
Broomfield	City and County of Broomfield	November 15, 2001	present
Laurette Buckskin Buckskin Joe	Park County, Colorado Territory	January 7, 1862	November 7, 1867
Buena Vista	Chaffee County, Colorado	1888	1928
Burlington	Kit Carson County, Colorado	April 11, 1889	present
Cañon City	Fremont County, Colorado Territory; Fremont County, Colorado	November 1, 1861	present
Carbonate	Garfield County, Colorado	February 10, 1883	1883
Castle Rock	Douglas County, Colorado Territory; Douglas County, Colorado	1874	present
Central City	Mountain County, Jefferson Territory *	November 28, 1859	June 6, 1861
Central City	Gilpin County, Colorado Territory; Gilpin County, Colorado	November 1, 1861	present
Cheyenne Wells	Cheyenne County, Colorado	March 25, 1889	present
Colorado City	El Paso County, Jefferson Territory *	November 28, 1859	June 6, 1861
Colorado City	El Paso County, Colorado Territory	November 1, 1861	1873
Colorado City	Capital of the Territory of Colorado ⁂	July 7, 1862	August 14, 1862
Colorado Springs	El Paso County, Colorado Territory; El Paso County, Colorado	1873	present
Conejos	Conejos County, Colorado Territory; Conejos County, Colorado	1863	present
Cortez	Montezuma County, Colorado	April 16, 1889	present
San Miguel Costilla	Costilla County, Colorado Territory	November 1, 1861	1863
Craig	Moffat County, Colorado	February 27, 1911	present
Amethyst Creede	Mineral County, Colorado	November 7, 1893	present
Cripple Creek	Teller County, Colorado	March 23, 1899	present
Dayton	Lake County, Colorado Territory	1866	1868
Del Norte	Rio Grande County, Colorado Territory; Rio Grande County, Colorado	February 10, 1874	present
Delta	Delta County, Colorado	February 11, 1883	present
Denver City Denver	Capital of the Territory of Jefferson ⁂	October 24, 1859	November 13, 1860
Denver City Denver	Arapahoe County, Jefferson Territory *	November 28, 1859	June 6, 1861
Denver City Denver	Capital of the Territory of Colorado ⁂	February 28, 1861	July 7, 1862
Denver City Denver	Arapahoe County, Colorado Territory; Arapahoe County, Colorado	November 1, 1861	November 15, 1902
Denver City Denver	Capital of the Territory of Colorado ⁂	December 9, 1867	August 1, 1876
Denver City Denver	Capital of the State of Colorado #	August 1, 1876	present
Denver City Denver	City and County of Denver, Colorado	December 1, 1902	present
Dove Creek	Dolores County, Colorado	1945	present
Durango	La Plata County, Colorado	1881	present
Eads	Kiowa County, Colorado	1902	present
Eagle	Eagle County, Colorado	1921	present
Evans	Weld County, Colorado Territory; Weld County, Colorado	1870	1874
Evans	Weld County, Colorado Territory; Weld County, Colorado	1875	1877
Fair Play Fairplay	Park County, Colorado Territory; Park County, Colorado	November 7, 1867	present
Fort Collins	Larimer County, Colorado Territory; Larimer County, Colorado	1868	present
Fort Morgan	Morgan County, Colorado	February 19, 1889	present
Frankstown	Douglas County, Colorado Territory	November 1, 1861	1864
California Ranch Franktown	Douglas County, Colorado Territory	1864	1874
Georgetown	Clear Creek County, Colorado Territory; Clear Creek County, Colorado	1867	present
Barlow Glenwood Springs	Garfield County, Colorado	1883	present
Golden City Golden	Jefferson County, Jefferson Territory *	November 6, 1860	June 6, 1861
Golden City Golden	Capital of the Territory of Jefferson ⁂	November 13, 1860	June 6, 1861
Golden City Golden	Jefferson County, Colorado Territory; Jefferson County, Colorado	November 1, 1861	present
Golden City Golden	Capital of the Territory of Colorado ⁂	August 14, 1862	December 9, 1967
Grand Junction	Mesa County, Colorado	February 11, 1883	present
Grand Lake	Grand County, Colorado	1882	1888
Granite	Lake County, Colorado Territory; Lake County, Colorado	1868	February 8, 1879
Granite	Carbonate County, Colorado *	February 8, 1879	February 10, 1879
Granite	Chaffee County, Colorado	February 10, 1879	1888
Greeley	Weld County, Colorado Territory	1874	1875
Greeley	Weld County, Colorado	1877	present
Guadaloupe Guadalupe	Guadaloupe County, Colorado Territory *	November 1, 1861	November 7, 1861
Guadaloupe Guadalupe	Conejos County, Colorado Territory	November 7, 1861	1863
Gunnison	Gunnison County, Colorado	March 9, 1877	present
Hahns Peak	Routt County, Colorado	1878	1912
Hayden	Routt County, Colorado	January 29, 1877	1878
Holyoke	Phillips County, Colorado	March 27, 1889	present
Hot Sulphur Springs Sulphur Springs Hot Sulphur Springs	Grand County, Colorado Territory; Grand County, Colorado	February 2, 1874	1882
Hot Sulphur Springs Sulphur Springs Hot Sulphur Springs	Grand County, Colorado Territory; Grand County, Colorado	1888	present
Howardsville	La Plata County, Colorado Territory	February 10, 1874	January 31, 1876
Hugo	Lincoln County, Colorado	April 11, 1889	present
Idaho	Clear Creek County, Colorado Territory	November 1, 1861	1867
Julesburg	Sedgwick County, Colorado	April 9, 1889	present
Kiowa	Elbert County, Colorado Territory; Elbert County, Colorado	February 2, 1874	present
Kit Carson	Greenwood County, Colorado Territory *	February 11, 1870	February 6, 1874
La Junta	Otero County, Colorado	March 25, 1889	present
La Porte	Heele County, Jefferson Territory *	November 28, 1859	June 6, 1861
La Porte	Larimer County, Colorado Territory	November 1, 1861	1868
Lake City	Hinsdale County, Colorado Territory; Hinsdale County, Colorado	1875	present
Lamar	Prowers County, Colorado	April 11, 1889	present
Las Animas (east)	Bent County, Colorado Territory	February 11, 1870	1870
Las Animas (east)	Bent County, Colorado Territory	1872	1875
West Las Animas Las Animas	Bent County, Colorado Territory; Bent County, Colorado	1875	present
Latham	Weld County, Colorado Territory	1868	1870
Leadville	Lake County, Colorado	February 10, 1879	present
Littleton	South Arapahoe County, Colorado *	November 15, 1902	April 11, 1903
Littleton	Arapahoe County, Colorado	April 11, 1903	present
Meeker	Rio Blanco County, Colorado	March 25, 1889	present
Montrose	Montrose County, Colorado	February 11, 1883	present
Ordway	Crowley County, Colorado	May 29, 1911	present
Oro City	Lake County, Colorado Territory	November 1, 1861	1866
Ouray	Ouray County, Colorado	January 18, 1877	February 27, 1883
Ouray	Uncompahgre County, Colorado *	February 27, 1883	March 2, 1883
Ouray	Ouray County, Colorado	March 2, 1883	present
Pagosa Springs	Archuleta County, Colorado	April 14, 1885	present
Parkville	Summit County, Colorado Territory	November 1, 1861	1862
Parrott City	La Plata County, Colorado Territory; La Plata County, Colorado	January 31, 1876	1881
Pueblo	Fountain County, Jefferson Territory *	November 28, 1859	June 6, 1861
Pueblo	Pueblo County, Colorado Territory; Pueblo County, Colorado	November 1, 1861	present
Red Cliff Redcliff	Eagle County, Colorado	February 11, 1883	1921
Rico	Dolores County, Colorado	March 4, 1881	1945
Rosita	Custer County, Colorado	1878	1886
Saguache	Saguache County, Colorado Territory; Saguache County, Colorado	December 29, 1866	present
Saint Vrain	St. Vrain County, Jefferson Territory *	November 28, 1859	June 6, 1861
Saint Vrain	Weld County, Colorado Territory	November 1, 1861	1868
Salida	Chaffee County, Colorado	1928	present
San Juan City San Juan	Hinsdale County, Colorado Territory	February 10, 1874	February 23, 1875
San Luis	Costilla County, Colorado Territory; Costilla County, Colorado	1863	present
Sheridan Lake	Kiowa County, Colorado	April 11, 1889	1902
Silver Cliff	Custer County, Colorado	1886	1928
Silverton	San Juan County, Colorado Territory; San Juan County, Colorado	January 31, 1876	present
Springfield	Baca County, Colorado	April 16, 1889	present
Steamboat Springs	Routt County, Colorado	1912	present
Sterling	Logan County, Colorado	February 25, 1887	present
Tarryall City Tarryall	Park County, Jefferson Territory *	November 28, 1859	June 6, 1861
Tarryall City Tarryall	Park County, Colorado Territory	November 1, 1861	January 7, 1862
Columbia Telluride	San Miguel County, Colorado	March 2, 1883	present
Trinidad	Las Animas County, Colorado Territory; Las Animas County, Colorado	February 9, 1866	present
Ula	Custer County, Colorado	March 9, 1877	1878
Walden	Jackson County, Colorado	May 5, 1909	present
Walsenburgh Tourist Walsenburgh Walsenburg	Huerfano County, Colorado Territory; Huerfano County, Colorado	1874	present
Wason	Mineral County, Colorado	March 27, 1893	November 7, 1893
Westcliffe	Custer County, Colorado	1928	present
Wray	Yuma County, Colorado	1902	present
Yuma	Yuma County, Colorado	March 15, 1889	1902

== County seat distinctions ==
1. The six cities of Boulder, Cañon City, Central City, Denver, Golden, and Pueblo are the longest serving Colorado county seats as designated by the Territory of Colorado on November 1, 1861. Of these six cities, Boulder City, Central City, Denver City, and Pueblo had previously been selected as county seats by the extralegal Territory of Jefferson on November 28, 1859.
2. Of the 64 current counties of Colorado, 38 have retained their original county seat.
3. Weld County has changed its county seat five times: in 1868, 1870, 1874, 1875, and 1877.
4. Though no longer a county seat, Granite has served as the county seat of three counties: Lake County, Carbonate County, and Chaffee County.
5. Conejos is the only remaining unincorporated county seat in Colorado.
6. San Miguel (later Costilla) was designated the original county seat of Costilla County, Colorado Territory, despite lying unbeknownst 1.5 miles (2.4 km) south of the border in the Territory of New Mexico.

== See also ==
- Bibliography of Colorado
- Geography of Colorado
- History of Colorado
- Index of Colorado-related articles
- List of Colorado-related lists
  - List of counties in Colorado
    - List of Colorado counties by per capita income
    - List of Colorado counties by population
    - List of Colorado counties by socioeconomic factors
    - List of Colorado counties by statistical area
    - List of Colorado county high points
    - List of Colorado municipalities by county
    - List of Colorado populated places by county
    - List of county courthouses in Colorado
- Outline of Colorado
