= Arapahoe County =

Arapahoe County may refer to:

- Arapahoe County, Colorado
- Arapahoe County, Kansas Territory, a large county that included the entire western portion of the Territory of Kansas.
- Arrappahoe County, Jefferson Territory, a county of the extralegal Territory of Jefferson.
