= Park County, Jefferson Territory =

County of the extralegal United States Territory of Jefferson

Coordinates: 39.12°N 105.71°W

Park County was a county of the extralegal United States Territory of Jefferson that existed from November 28, 1859, until February 28, 1861.

== History ==
In July 1858, gold was discovered along the South Platte River in Arapahoe County, Kansas Territory. This discovery precipitated the Pike's Peak Gold Rush. Many residents of the mining region felt disconnected from the remote territorial governments of Kansas and Nebraska, so they voted to form their own Territory of Jefferson on October 24, 1859. On November 28, the General Assembly of the Territory of Jefferson organized 12 counties: Arrappahoe County, Cheyenne County, El Paso County, Fountain County, Heele County, Jackson County, Jefferson County, Mountain County, North County, Park County, Saratoga County, and St. Vrain's County. The legislation that created Park County declared:

That the territory comprised within the limits of what is known as the South Park, be erected into a county to be called Park county.

Park County was named for South Park, and encompassed much of what is today Park County, Colorado.

The settlements then existing in the county were the new mining camps of: Tarryall City, Jefferson, Hamilton, Montgomery, and Buckskin Joe (Laurette).

The Jefferson Territory never received federal sanction, but on February 28, 1861, U.S. President James Buchanan signed an act organizing the Territory of Colorado. On November 1, 1861, the Colorado General Assembly organized 17 counties, including Park County, for the new Colorado Territory.

== Elections And Elected Officials ==
Park County's first office holding official was George W. Bowers, appointed by Governor Robert Williamson Steele in December 1859 as President Judge of Park County. He was to hold office until the county's first popular election was held on January 2, 1860.

== See also ==
- Outline of Colorado
- Index of Colorado-related articles
- Historic Colorado counties
- History of Colorado
- Park County, Colorado
- Pike's Peak Gold Rush
- State of Colorado
- Territory of Colorado
- Territory of Jefferson
