= 1911 Sonora hurricane =

Pacific hurricane in 1911

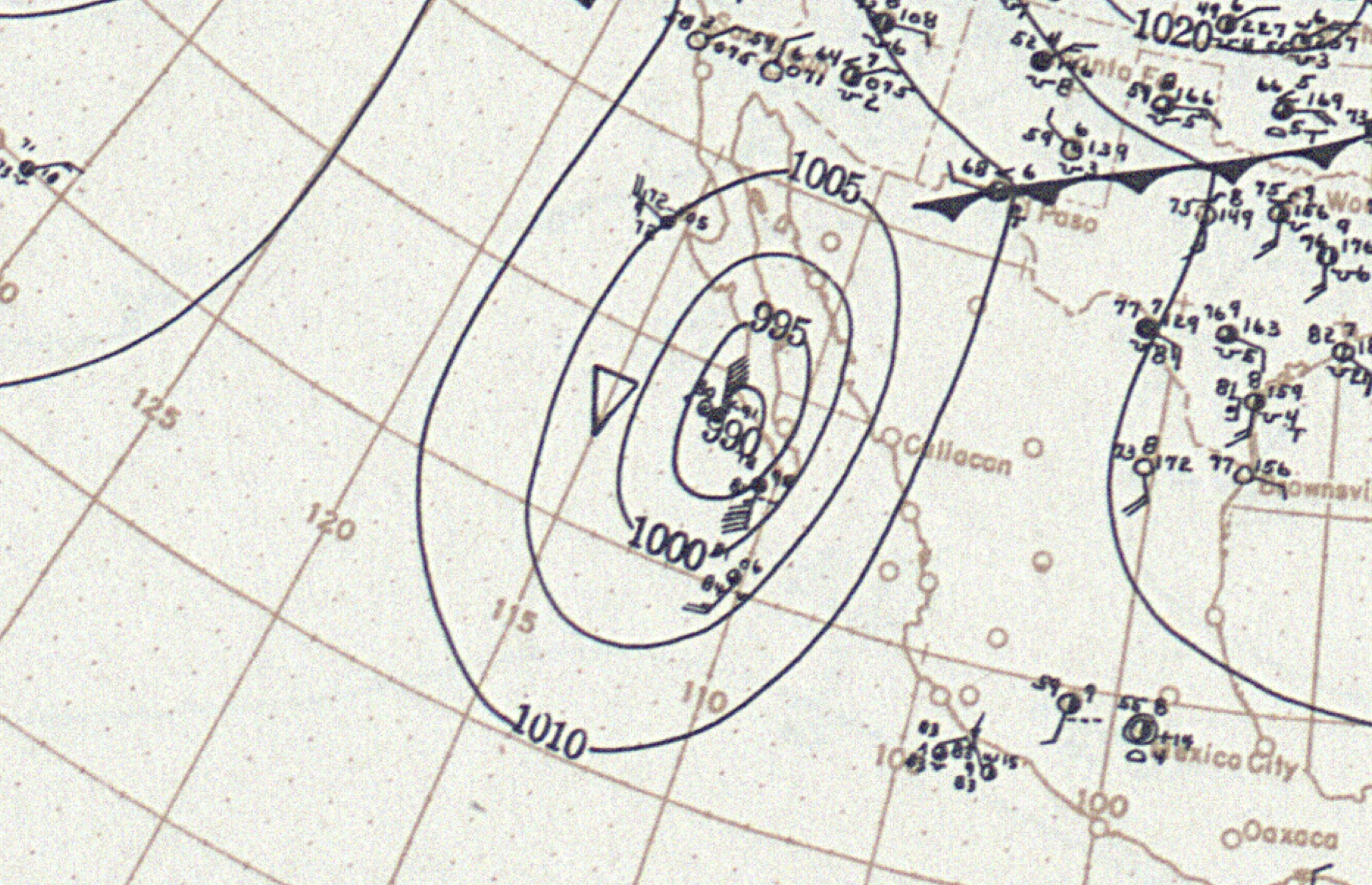
- Surface weather analysis showing the hurricane nearing landfall in the Baja California Peninsula on October 4

Meteorological history
- Formed: October 1, 1911
- Remnant low: October 6, 1911
- Dissipated: October 5, 1911

Category 1 hurricane
- 1-minute sustained (SSHWS/NWS)
- Highest winds: 75 mph (120 km/h)
- Lowest pressure: 999 mbar (hPa); 29.50 inHg

Overall effects
- Fatalities: >273
- Damage: >$2.3 million (1911 USD)
- Areas affected: Western Mexico, Western United States (especially Colorado)
- Part of the 1910s Pacific hurricane seasons

The 1911 Sonora hurricane was a deadly tropical cyclone that had effects that extended far inland, producing significant flooding in the U.S. state of Colorado. The storm originated on October 1 to the southwest of Mexico. It moved to the northwest, striking the Baja California peninsula on October 4, where it destroyed crops and buildings. After crossing the peninsula and the Gulf of California, the hurricane moved ashore the Mexican state of Sonora with strong winds and high tides. The port city of Guaymas and other nearby towns were damaged, with roofs torn and rail lines washed away. In Mexico, the storm killed between 300–500 people. The remnants of the storm moved into the southwestern United States and interacted with a shortwave trough. In Colorado, the former hurricane dropped 8.16 in (207 mm) of rain in the San Juan Mountains. This was the highest rainfall total related to an Atlantic or Pacific hurricane in the state. The rains caused flooding that killed five people in Colorado, while also washing away bridges and houses. Two lines of the Denver and Rio Grande Western Railroad were out of service for over 50 days.

== Meteorological history ==
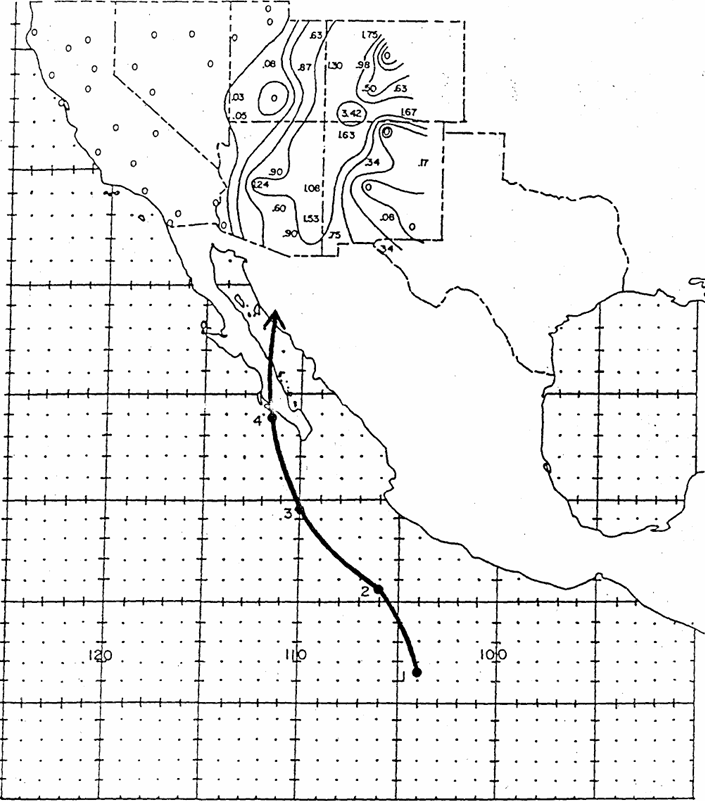
Track and precipitation map of the hurricane

A tropical cyclone developed in the eastern Pacific Ocean on October 1, southwest of Mexico, at roughly 11.5ºN 104ºW. It moved northwestward, eventually making landfall along the western Baja California peninsula on October 4, just west of La Paz. It crossed the peninsula and weakened before emerging into the Gulf of California. Later, the storm moved ashore Sonora in northwestern Mexico with hurricane-force winds that lasted for several hours. The storm was drawn northward by a shortwave trough over Nevada. The hurricane's remnant low moved across the southwestern United States through Arizona, near the Four Corners region, and into Colorado, where it dropped heavy rainfall. The low later moved into Iowa.

== Impacts and aftermath ==
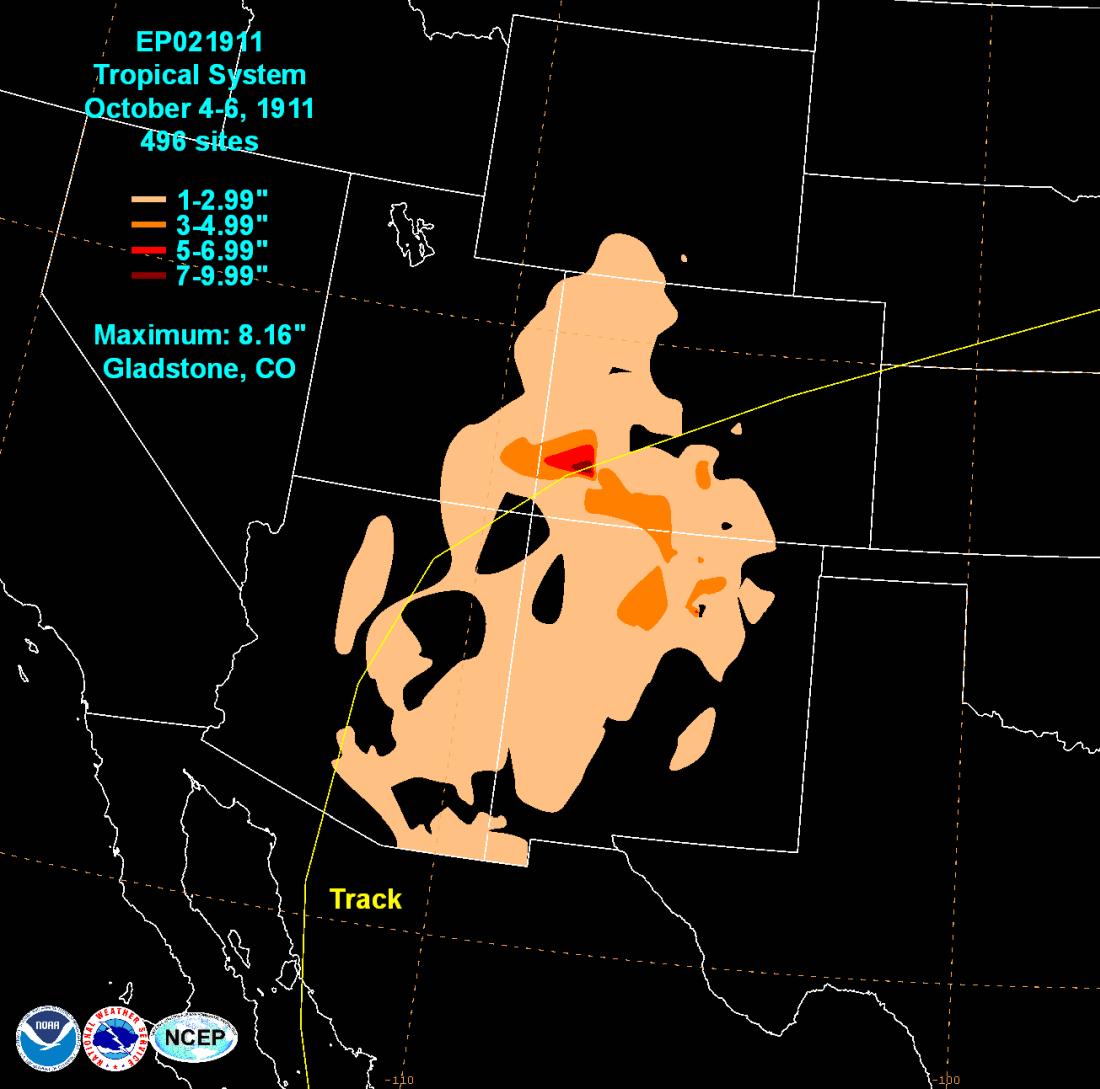
Map of the total rainfall from the hurricane across the Southwestern United States

Before the hurricane made landfall, it produced high waves that lashed the steamer Nevadan on October 3, while it was sailing 50 mi (80 km) north of Cabo San Lucas. The waves killed a sailor and injured another person. At San José del Cabo, the hurricane destroyed the sugar cane crop from its strong winds. Along the western Baja California peninsula, the storm also destroyed three stone warehouses at Magdalena Bay.

The hurricane struck Sonora with strong winds and high tides, killing at least 273 people. Newspapers described the wall of water as a "tidal wave". The hurricane severed telegraph lines, which delayed the news of the disaster until October 11, a week after its passage. High winds ripped off roofs and leveled houses in Guaymas. In the same city, floodwaters surpassed the seawall and inundated coastal areas 3 ft (0.91 m) deep, causing heavy damage. The storm washed out a 3 km (1.9 mi) causeway over the bay. In the harbor, a few lighters were driven ashore, while at least four schooners were wrecked. The hurricane also destroyed the rail stations at Empalme and Ortiz, with rail damage estimated at US$300,000. The storm washed out portions of the Southern Pacific railroad, which halted traffic south of Hermosillo. A mine suffered about US$2 million in damage. Farther inland at Hermosillo, the storm's winds damaged roofs and trees. The hurricane left Guaymas and the nearby mining town of Rosalia short on water and food supply. Relief supplies were sent by train to the region, although most supplies were looted. The town of Ortiz built a memorial to a man who died while helping evacuate residents. On October 17, Mexico's Chamber of Deputies authorized 30,000 pesos for residents affected by the hurricane.

Following a summer of above normal precipitation, the remnants of the hurricane moved across the southwestern United States, producing a widespread area of rainfall that first affected Arizona and Utah. Monticello in the latter state recorded 4.42 in (112 mm). The heaviest rainfall occurred in Colorado, reaching 8.16 in (207 mm) at Gladstone in the San Juan Mountains at an elevation of 10,400 ft (3,200 m). This was the highest rainfall total in the state related to an Atlantic or Pacific hurricane. The rainfall total at Gladstone was unusual. In typical years at that elevation, such precipitation would usually occur as snowfall. The event also marked one of the earliest major flood events in the western United States related to a Pacific hurricane.

In Colorado, the floods killed five people. After a summer of above-normal rainfall, the floods in early October occurred over such a widespread area that the United States Weather Bureau assessed there being "no previous record, or even tradition, among the Indians of such severe floods occurring simultaneously in all the streams of southwestern Colorado and northwestern New Mexico." The sudden rainfall caused the Goose Lake Reservoir, located near the head of the Huerfano River, to collapse, killing three people from the sudden wall of water. The heaviest rainfall occurred over a small area. with higher totals in the mountain peaks. The floods extended across the San Juan river basin, the San Luis Valley, the Rio Grande, and the Purgatoire River. The Denver and Rio Grande Western Railroad suffered at least $500,000 in damages, after the floods destroyed 7 mi (11 km) of railroad track, along with several bridges. Two rail lines were closed for at least 50 days. Along the San Juan River, the floods swept away 18 buildings and a power plant. At Pagosa Springs, the river swelled to a peak of 17.8 ft (5.4 m), which is 13 ft (4.0 m) above normal. The floods arrived quickly, remained for about three hours, and then receded rapidly. The town of Arboles, located 35 mi (56 km) downstream, experienced the floods about five hours later, with the river swelling 17 ft (5.2 m) above normal. This suggested that the floodwaters had a speed of 7 mph (11 km/h). The flood event was the most severe for the San Juan River since at least 1880, and would remain unsurpassed for the remainder of the 20th century. Newspapers described the Animas River as "[resembling] one big lake". Elsewhere, floodwaters displaced hundreds of feet of railroad track in Guadalupe, while also damaging irrigation ditches. At Trinidad, the floodwaters inundated low-lying areas. At Del Norte, officials warned sleeping residents with a fire bell, before floodwaters covered the town up to 3 ft (0.91 m) deep. At Alamosa, floods broke a dyke along the Rio Grande, resulting in minor flooding. In Bayfield, the Los Pinos River swept away a house. Floods also washed away a bridge along the La Plata River at Pendleton, New Mexico.

== See also ==
- Hurricane Lester (1992) - another hurricane that crossed the Baja California peninsula and brought rainfall to the western United States
