= Jefferson County, Jefferson Territory =

Coordinates: 39.59°N 105.25°W

Jefferson County was a county of the extralegal United States Territory of Jefferson that existed from November 28, 1859, until February 28, 1861. Its territory covered a broad swath surrounding the region of the Pike's Peak Gold Rush, and was a functioning democratically elected government until the organization of the Territory of Colorado in 1861. At that time, the successor Jefferson County was permanently created, taking its name from its predecessor and incorporating the heart of its territory.

== History ==
In July 1858, gold was discovered along the South Platte River in Arapahoe County, Kansas Territory. This discovery precipitated the Pike's Peak Gold Rush. Many residents of the mining region felt disconnected from the remote territorial governments of Kansas and Nebraska, so they voted to form their own Territory of Jefferson on October 24, 1859. On November 28, the General Assembly of the Territory of Jefferson organized 12 counties: Arrappahoe County, Cheyenne County, El Paso County, Fountain County, Heele County, Jackson County, Jefferson County, Mountain County, North County, Park County, Saratoga County, and St. Vrain's County.

Jefferson County was named in honor of Thomas Jefferson. Golden City served as the county seat of Jefferson County. Golden City also served as the capital of the Jefferson Territory from November 13, 1860, to June 6, 1861. Jefferson County encompassed much of what is today Jefferson County, Colorado.

The Jefferson Territory never received federal sanction, but on February 28, 1861, U.S. President James Buchanan signed an act organizing the Territory of Colorado. On November 1, 1861, the Colorado General Assembly organized 17 counties, including Jefferson County, Colorado.

== County Territory ==
According to historical description Jefferson County occupied an area bounded by the South Platte River to the east, the 40th parallel to the north, Bear Creek to the south, and 10 miles west of Bear Creek to the west, encompassing territory in modern-day Jefferson County, Adams County, Denver County, Boulder County, Clear Creek County, and Gilpin County. The townsite of Highland at the eastern edge along the South Platte was excluded from its borders. Its boundaries were set in Chapter X of the General Acts of the Territory of Jefferson which declared:

That the territory comprised within the following limits, be erected into a county to be called Jefferson: commencing at a point on the 40th parallel of north latitude where it is crossed by the main channel of the south fork of the Platte River, thence up the main channel of said stream to the mouth of Clear Creek, to the mouth of Ralston's Creek; thence in a straight line to the point where the main channel of Montana Creek joins the south fork of the Platte, thence up said river to the mouth of the canon at the base of the mountains; thence west eight miles; thence north to where said line would intersect the south line of Jackson county; thence east to the south east corner of said Jackson county, thence north to the 40th parallel, thence east to the place of beginning.

== County Seat ==
The Jefferson Territorial legislature after much debate designated Arapahoe City the county seat of Jefferson County. However, the decision of the county seat was ultimately left to its people, and elections were held to determine what city would lead. On January 2, 1860 the nearby town of Golden City won the honor, by more votes than the rest of the county's communities combined by virtue of its being the most populous city. According to the Western Mountaineer newspaper, which covered all of the county's elections, Arapahoe City was its only existing competitor, while protest against the government led 22 Golden City voters to instead vote for the town of Baden, a paper townsite. Golden City was permanently named county seat in a second election on July 2, 1860.

== Communities ==
Jefferson County's communities included four organized towns and other area settlements. Its first town, Arapahoe City was organized in 1858 along Clear Creek just east of North Table Mountain. Its second and most populous town was Golden City, and towns at nearby canyon entrances were Mt. Vernon and Golden Gate City. Other settled areas were Bergen's Ranch and Henderson's Island. In 1861 Baden-Baden was officially settled as Apex. Of Jefferson County's towns, only Golden remains today. All other communities besides Arapahoe City and Apex were settled in 1859.

== Elections and elected officials ==
Jefferson County's first office holding official was J. T. McWhirt, appointed by Governor Robert Williamson Steele in December 1859 as President Judge of Jefferson County. When the county's first popular election was held on January 2, 1860, area locals presented the Miners Ticket of favorite local candidates, including McWhirt as President Judge; Theodore Perry Boyd and Asa Smith as Associate Justices; Walter Pollard for Sheriff; Eli Carter as Recorder; Harry Gunnell as Clerk County Court; Daniel L. McCleery as Assessor; George B. Allen as Treasurer; J. F. Rhodes as County Attorney; and Golden City as the county seat. This ticket won the election. The county's 2nd election on July 2, 1860 designated Golden City as the permanent county seat. Jefferson County's 3rd and last election was held to replace departed officials on October 22, 1860, electing E. W. McIlhany Sheriff and John F. Kirby Recorder.

== Secession and Ni Wot County ==
Being an extra-legal government led some to actively question Jefferson County's legitimacy, and in early 1861 the citizens of the Junction, Mt. Vernon and Bergen precincts voted to secede and, ironically, form their own extra-legal Ni Wot County in protest. This led Gov. Steele and other loyalists living at Mt. Vernon to secede on their own and create a real town at Apex, and relocate Jefferson Territorial functions there. All of this activity was noted rather musingly by the Rocky Mountain News with the backdrop of secession activity taking place at the time elsewhere in the United States.

== County Dissolution ==
When Colorado Territory was organized in 1861, both Jefferson County and rebellious Ni Wot County laid down their differences and acceded to the federally recognized government, which reunited them into the modern-day Jefferson County, Colorado.

== See also ==
- Outline of Colorado
- Index of Colorado-related articles
- Historic Colorado counties
- History of Colorado
- Jefferson County, Colorado
- Pike's Peak Gold Rush
- State of Colorado
- Territory of Colorado
- Territory of Jefferson
