= Mountain County, Jefferson Territory =

Coordinates: 38°20′N 107°0′W

Mountain County was a county of the extralegal United States Territory of Jefferson that existed from November 28, 1859, until February 28, 1861.

== History ==
In July 1858, gold was discovered along the South Platte River in Arapahoe County, Kansas Territory. This discovery precipitated the Pike's Peak Gold Rush. Many residents of the mining region felt disconnected from the remote territorial governments of Kansas and Nebraska, so they voted to form their own Territory of Jefferson on October 24, 1859. On November 28, the General Assembly of the Territory of Jefferson organized 12 counties: Arrappahoe County, Cheyenne County, El Paso County, Fountain County, Heele County, Jackson County, Jefferson County, Mountain County, North County, Park County, Saratoga County, and St. Vrain's County. The legislation that created Mountain County declared:

That the territory lying south of the 40th parallel and not comprised within the limits of Park, Saratoga, Jefferson, or Jackson counties, be erected into a county to be called Mountain county.

Mountain County encompassed much of what is today Gilpin County, Clear Creek County, and southwestern Colorado.

The Jefferson Territory never received federal sanction, but on February 28, 1861, U.S. President James Buchanan signed an act organizing the Territory of Colorado. On November 1, 1861, the Colorado General Assembly organized 17 counties, including Gilpin County and Clear Creek County, for the new Colorado Territory.

== Elections And Elected Officials ==
The county's first office holding official was by name of Duney, appointed by Governor Robert Williamson Steele in December 1859 as President Judge. He was to hold office until the county's first popular election was held on January 2, 1860.

== See also ==
- Outline of Colorado
- Index of Colorado-related articles
- Clear Creek County, Colorado
- Gilpin County, Colorado
- Historic Colorado counties
- History of Colorado
- Pike's Peak Gold Rush
- State of Colorado
- Territory of Colorado
- Territory of Jefferson
