= Heele County, Jefferson Territory =

Heele County was a county of the extralegal United States Territory of Jefferson that existed from November 28, 1859, until February 28, 1861. It may also have been known as Steele County.

== History ==
In July 1858, gold was discovered along the South Platte River in Arapahoe County, Kansas Territory. This discovery precipitated the Pike's Peak Gold Rush. Many residents of the mining region felt disconnected from the remote territorial governments of Kansas and Nebraska, so they voted to form their own Territory of Jefferson on October 24, 1859. On November 28, the General Assembly of the Territory of Jefferson organized 12 counties: Arrappahoe County, Cheyenne County, El Paso County, Fountain County, Heele County, Jackson County, Jefferson County, Mountain County, North County, Park County, Saratoga County, and St. Vrain's County. The legislation that created Heele County declared:

That the territory comprised within the following limits, be erected into a county to be called Heele: commencing at the south east corner of Town Range 4, North 69 West; thence north to the north east corner of Town 69 West Range 10 North, thence west to the summit of the Rocky Mountains; thence southwardly to the north west corner of Jackson county; thence east to the place of beginning.

Heele County encompassed much of what is today Larimer County, Colorado.

The Jefferson Territory never received federal sanction, but on February 28, 1861, U.S. President James Buchanan signed an act organizing the Territory of Colorado. On November 1, 1861, the Colorado General Assembly organized 17 counties, including Larimer County, for the new Colorado Territory.

== Elections And Elected Officials ==
If identified as Steele County, the first office holding official was Antoine Jeness, appointed by Governor Robert Williamson Steele in December 1859 as President Judge of Steele County. He was to hold office until the county's first popular election was held on January 2, 1860.

== See also ==
- Outline of Colorado
- Index of Colorado-related articles
- Historic Colorado counties
- History of Colorado
- Larimer County, Colorado
- Pike's Peak Gold Rush
- State of Colorado
- Territory of Colorado
- Territory of Jefferson
