= Arapahoe, Jefferson County, Colorado =

Ghost town in Jefferson County, Colorado, United States

Arapahoe, Kansas Territory
- historic gold camp
- Location of Arapahoe, Kansas Territory (historic site) Arapahoe (Colorado)
- Coordinates: 39.7750°N 105.1783°W
- Country: United States
- State: Colorado
- County: Jefferson
- Founded: November 29, 1858

Government
  - Type: historic site
  - Body: Jefferson County
- Elevation: 5,585 ft (1,702 m)
- Time zone: UTC−07:00 (MST)
  - Summer (DST): UTC−06:00 (MDT)

Arapahoe (also Arapahoe City or Arrapahoe City) was one of the first settlements in what is now the U.S. state of Colorado. Nothing remains of the now deserted ghost town in Jefferson County, except a historical marker on the south side of 44th Avenue, between the cities of Golden and Wheat Ridge.

== History ==
Gold prospectors founded Arapahoe City in the Territory of Kansas on November 29, 1858 during the advent of the Pikes Peak gold rush. The town was laid out by George B. Allen, and according to founding treasurer Thomas L. Golden in a letter to the Missouri Republican it was named after the Arapaho tribe after chiefs warned residents to "quit their country". Arapahoe City was a base camp town laid out on a grid to serve miners washing placer gold from nearby Clear Creek. The placer, Arapahoe Bar, had been discovered by the Estes Party as far back as 1834 and mined in earnest since 1858. The town was the fourth founded in the Pike's Peak gold region.

On October 24, 1859, voters of the gold region approved the establishment of the Provisional Government of the Territory of Jefferson. On November 28, 1859, the extralegal Jefferson Territory established 12 counties with Arapahoe City as the seat of the new Jefferson County. The Arapahoe, Kansas Territory (or Jefferson Territory), post office opened on January 17, 1860. The 1860 census found 80 people living at "Arrapahoe City," including 17 females. Arapahoe had fifty houses, ranging from tents to log cabins and buildings.

On November 6, 1860, the seat of Jefferson County was moved to the new Golden City. The easily accessible parts of the Arapahoe placers were quickly exhausted, and the rapid growth of Golden City a few miles west caused many in Arapahoe to physically move their log buildings to Golden City, so that by the end of 1860, Arapahoe City had shrunk to just a few cabins. The free Territory of Colorado was organized on February 28, 1861, and the Arapahoe post office closed on October 12, 1861. By 1867, the town was entirely gone.

Arapahoe Bar was later mined by hydraulic mining (1880s) and dredge mining (1904–07), featuring two of the pioneer electric mining dredges in the west, operated by Herman J. Reiling and the National Dredging Company. The company used the last remaining buildings of Arapahoe City for quarters, but before long all evidence of the town had vanished. The site of Arapahoe City is virtually destroyed today. No Arapahoe City buildings are known to have survived, though it is possible some may have been moved to nearby Golden or Fairmount, the farming community descended from Arapahoe City. The two dredges, not advanced enough to save large amounts of the fine gold at Arapahoe Bar, were disassembled, one taken to French Gulch near Breckenridge, Colorado and its twin taken to the American River around Sacramento, California. The fate of the California dredge remains unknown, while the remains of the dredge at Breckenridge, now known as the Reiling Dredge, are being preserved.

== Prominent Citizens ==
- Thomas L. Golden, after whom Golden, Colorado is named.
- John Hamilton Gregory, Colorado gold discoverer around present-day Central City, Colorado
- George Andrew Jackson, Colorado gold discoverer around present-day Idaho Springs, Colorado

== Geography ==
The historical marker locating Arapahoe is on the south side of 44th Avenue, 1,000 feet (300 m) west of the intersection with McIntyre Boulevard, at coordinates 39.7750°N 105.1783°W and an elevation of 5,585 feet (1,702 m).

== See also ==
- Colorado Territory
- Denver–Aurora–Lakewood, CO Metropolitan Statistical Area
- Front Range Urban Corridor
- Jefferson Territory
- Kansas Territory
- List of county seats in Colorado
- List of ghost towns in Colorado
- List of post offices in Colorado
- Pike's Peak gold rush
