= Jackson County, Jefferson Territory =

Coordinates: 40.09°N 105.36°W

Jackson County was a county of the extralegal United States Territory of Jefferson that existed from November 28, 1859, until February 28, 1861.

== History ==
In July 1858, gold was discovered along the South Platte River in Arapahoe County, Kansas Territory. This discovery precipitated the Pike's Peak Gold Rush. Many residents of the mining region felt disconnected from the remote territorial governments of Kansas and Nebraska, so they voted to form their own Territory of Jefferson on October 24, 1859. On November 28, the General Assembly of the Territory of Jefferson organized 12 counties: Arrappahoe County, Cheyenne County, El Paso County, Fountain County, Heele County, Jackson County, Jefferson County, Mountain County, North County, Park County, Saratoga County, and St. Vrain's County. The legislation that created Jackson County declared:

That the territory comprised within the following limits, be erected into a county to be called Jackson; commencing at a point on the 40th parallel, known in the field notes of the government surveys as the south east corner of Town 1, Range 1, North, 69 West of the 6th principal meridian, thence running south nine miles, thence north to the 40th parallel, thence west to the South Range, thence north 18 miles, thence to the north east corner of Town 3 North Range 69 West; thence south to the place of beginning; and also that the county seat be permanently located at Boulder City.

Jackson County was named in honor of U.S. President Andrew Jackson. Boulder City served as the county seat of Jackson County. Jackson County encompassed much of what is today Boulder County, Colorado.

The Jefferson Territory never received federal sanction, but on February 28, 1861, U.S. President James Buchanan signed an act organizing the Territory of Colorado. On November 1, 1861, the Colorado General Assembly organized 17 counties, including Boulder County, for the new Colorado Territory.

== Elections and elected officials ==
Jackson County's first office holding official was Thomas J. Graham, appointed by Governor Robert Williamson Steele in December 1859 as President Judge of Jackson County. He held office until the county's first popular election was held on January 2, 1860.

== See also ==
- Outline of Colorado
- Index of Colorado-related articles
- Boulder County, Colorado
- Historic Colorado counties
- History of Colorado
- Pike's Peak Gold Rush
- State of Colorado
- Territory of Colorado
- Territory of Jefferson
