= St. Vrain, Colorado =

St. Vrain
- ghost town
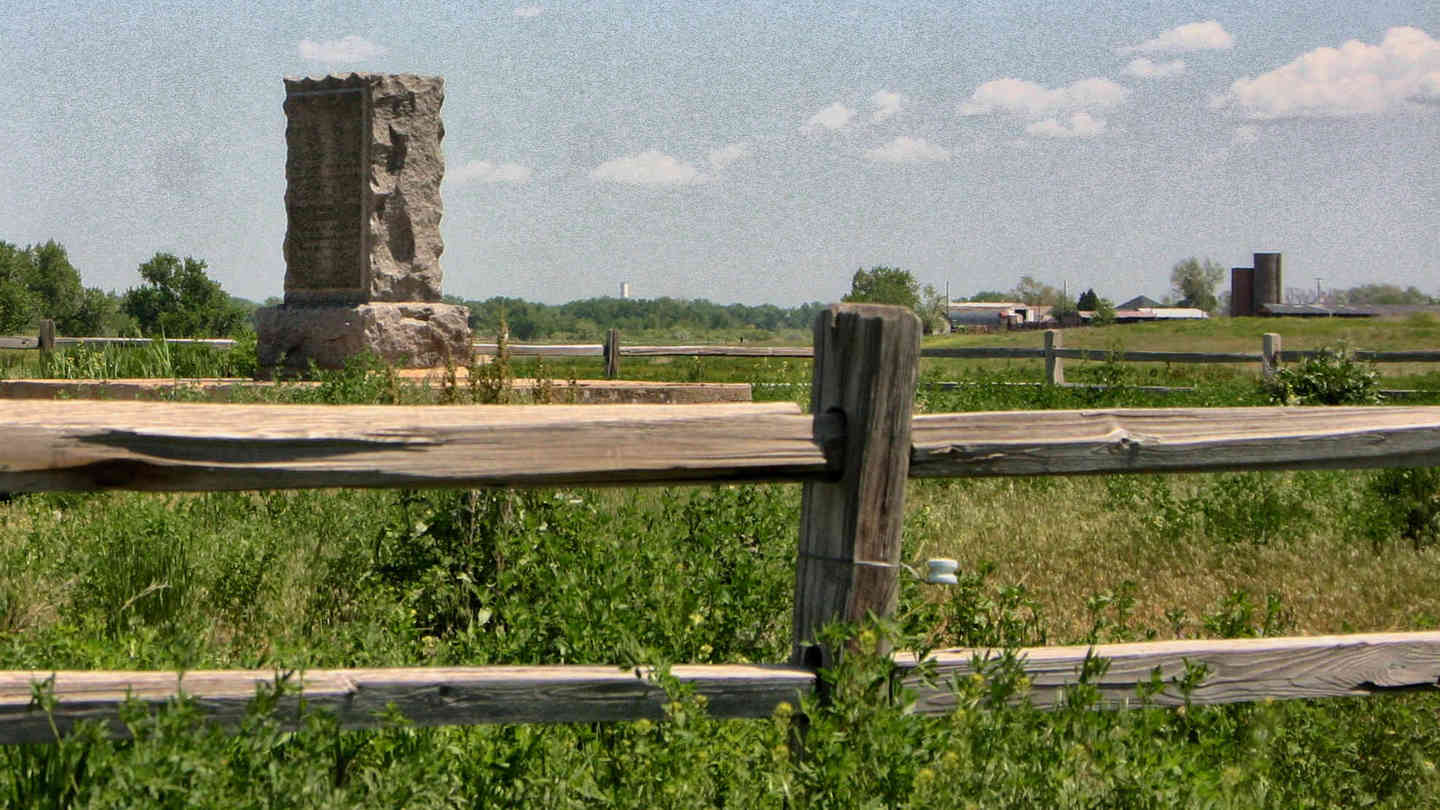
- Historical marker at the site of Fort Saint Vrain

- Location within Colorado Location within the United States
- Coordinates: 40°16′37″N 104°51′10″W
- Country: United States
- State: Colorado
- County: Weld
- Nearest town: Platteville
- Named for: Fort Saint Vrain
- Elevation (Note: Elevation from the Geographic Names Information System.): 4,764 ft (1,452 m)

St. Vrain is a ghost town located in Weld County, Colorado, United States. The town was located adjacent to the frontier trading post of Fort Saint Vrain northeast of the confluence of Saint Vrain Creek and the South Platte River.

== Etymology ==
The town of St. Vrain was named for nearby Fort Saint Vrain, which in turn took its name from Ceran de Hault de Lassus de Saint-Vrain, its founder. The historic Saint Vrain was known as Veranus of Cavaillon, a sixth-century French Christian bishop.

== History ==
Fort Saint Vrain was built in 1837 in the unorganized territory. After the fort closed, the area remained an important meeting point and place of refuge. On May 30, 1854, the area became part of the new Territory of Nebraska.

Gold was discovered upstream along the South Platte River in July 1858, and the area prospered from the prospector traffic along the South Platte River Trail. A post office was established at St. Vrain on January 18, 1859, and later that year, the St. Vrain Claims Club platted the Town of St. Vrain to avoid claim jumping. The extralegal Territory of Jefferson was organized on October 24, 1859, and on November 28, 1859, the Jefferson Territory created 12 counties including St. Vrain's County and designated St. Vrain as the county seat. The Jefferson Territory was superseded by the Territory of Colorado on February 28, 1861, and on November 1, 1861, the Colorado Territory designated St. Vrain as the county seat of the new Weld County.

Gradually, more accessible towns along the trail overtook St. Vrain. In 1868, the Weld County seat was moved to Latham (in present-day Greeley.) In 1875, the St. Vrain post office was moved to Platteville. In 1951, a farmer plowed up most of the area of the town and little evidence of its existence remains.

== See also ==
- List of ghost towns in Colorado
