= Conejos, Colorado =

Unincorporated community in Colorado, US

- Census-designated place
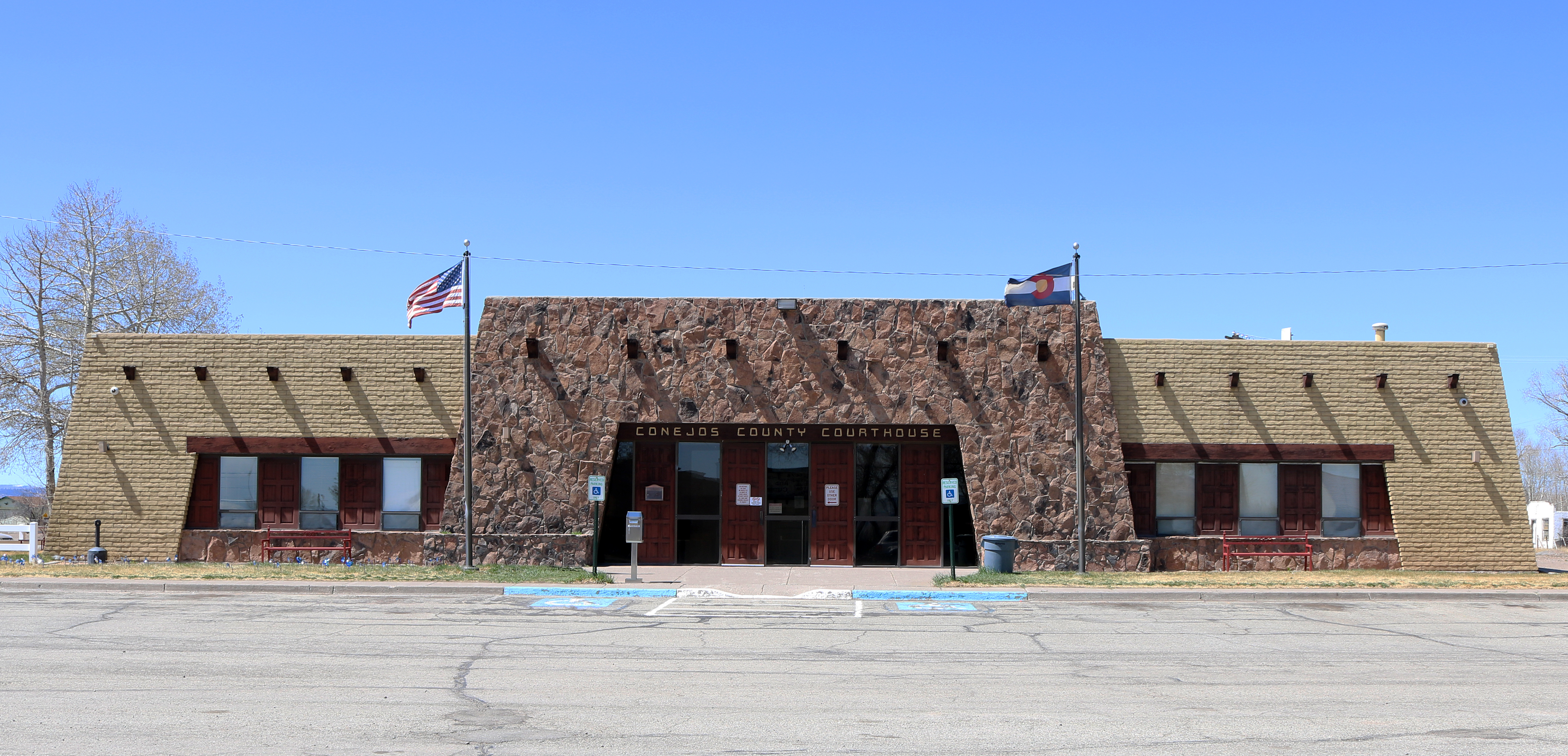
- Conejos County Courthouse in Conejos.

- Location of the Conejos CDP in Conejos County, Colorado.

- Location of Conejos, Colorado. Conejos (Colorado)
- Coordinates: 37.0883°N 106.0197°W
- Country: United States
- State: Colorado
- County: Conejos
- Founded: 1858

Government
  - Type: unincorporated community
  - Body: Conejos County

Area
  - Total: 0.484 sq mi (1.254 km^{2})
  - Land: 0.484 sq mi (1.254 km^{2})
  - Water: 0 sq mi (0.000 km^{2})
- Elevation: 7,904 ft (2,409 m)

Population (2020)
  - Total: 46
  - Density: 95/sq mi (37/km^{2})
- Time zone: UTC−07:00 (MST)
  - Summer (DST): UTC−06:00 (MDT)
- ZIP code: 81129
- Area code: 719
- GNIS place ID: 190913
- GNIS town ID: 2631317
- FIPS code: 08-16715

Conejos (Spanish for "rabbits") is an unincorporated town, a post office, a census-designated place (CDP), and the county seat of Conejos County, Colorado, United States. The Conejos post office has the ZIP Code 81129. At the United States Census 2020, the population of the Conejos CDP was 46. Conejos is the last unincorporated county seat in the State of Colorado.

== History ==
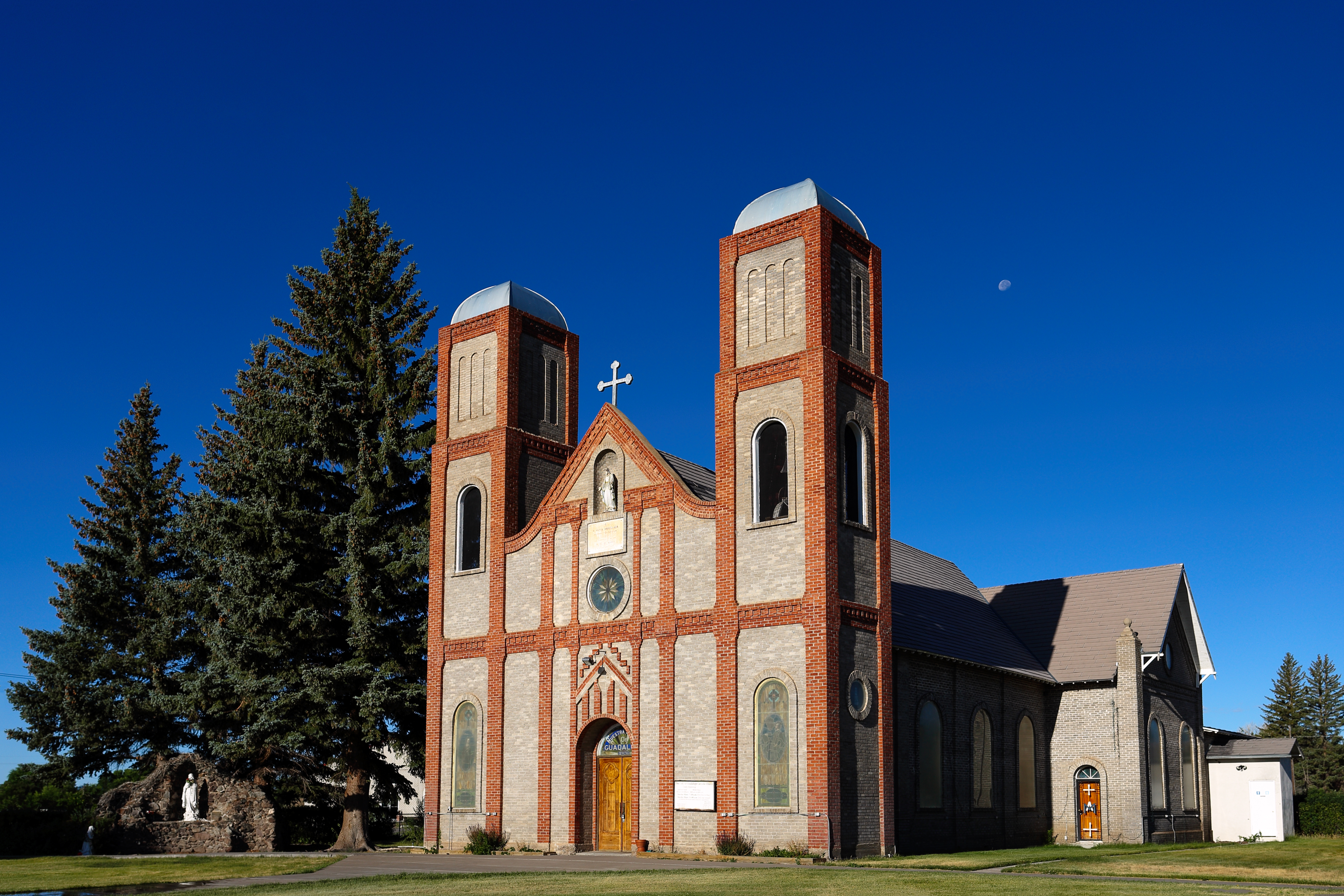
Our Lady of Guadalupe Catholic Church in Conejos.

Conejos was settled in 1858 in what was then Taos County, New Mexico Territory. A major historical and architectural feature of Conejos is the Our Lady of Guadalupe Catholic Church, founded in 1858. The church was the first Roman Catholic parish in modern-day Colorado and was constructed by Spanish colonists from Taos, New Mexico.

The Territory of Colorado was organized on February 28, 1861. On November 1, 1861, the Territorial Legislature created Guadaloupe County with the village of Guadalupe as the county seat. Six days later, the legislature changed the county name to Conejos County. Fearing flooding, the Conejos, Colorado Territory, post office opened on February 25, 1862, at a sight 3 feet (1 m) higher across the Conejos River. In 1863, Conejos County moved its county seat 0.6 miles (1.0 km) across the Conejos River to town of Conejos.

== Geography ==
Conejos is located in southeastern Conejos County in the San Luis Valley. It is bordered to the south by the town of Antonito. U.S. Route 285 forms the eastern edge of the community and leads north 28 miles (45 km) to Alamosa, Colorado, and south 31 miles (50 km) to Tres Piedras, New Mexico.

At the 2020 United States Census, the Conejos CDP had an area of 310 acres (1.254 km^{2}), all land.

== Demographics ==
The United States Census Bureau initially defined the Conejos CDP for the United States Census 2010.

Conejos CDP, Colorado
Year	Pop.	±%
2010	58	—
2020	46	−20.7%
Source: United States Census Bureau

== See also ==
- Alamosa, CO Micropolitan Statistical Area
- List of census-designated places in Colorado
- List of county seats in Colorado
- List of populated places in Colorado
- List of post offices in Colorado
