= Saratoga County, Jefferson Territory =

County of the extralegal United States Territory of Jefferson from 1859 to 1861

Saratoga County was a county of the extralegal United States Territory of Jefferson that existed from November 28, 1859, until February 28, 1861.

== History ==
In July 1858, gold was discovered along the South Platte River in Arapahoe County, Kansas Territory. This discovery precipitated the Pike's Peak Gold Rush. Many residents of the mining region felt disconnected from the remote territorial governments of Kansas and Nebraska, so they voted to form their own Territory of Jefferson on October 24, 1859. On November 28, the General Assembly of the Territory of Jefferson organized 12 counties: Arrappahoe County, Cheyenne County, El Paso County, Fountain County, Heele County, Jackson County, Jefferson County, Mountain County, North County, Park County, Saratoga County, and St. Vrain's County. The legislation that created Saratoga County declared:

That the territory comprised within the limits of what is known as the Middle Park, be erected into a county called Saratoga.

Saratoga County was named for Saratoga Springs, New York, because the hot mineral springs found in the county. Saratoga County encompassed much of what is today Grand County and Summit County, Colorado.

The Jefferson Territory never received federal sanction, but on February 28, 1861, U.S. President James Buchanan signed an act organizing the Territory of Colorado. On November 1, 1861, the Colorado General Assembly organized 17 counties, including Grand County, for the new Colorado Territory.

== County seat ==
The Saratoga County seat was at the mining town of Breckinridge. Now known as Breckenridge, it is now the seat of Summit County.

== Elections and elected officials ==
Saratoga County's first office holding official was John W. McIntyre, appointed by Governor Robert Williamson Steele in December 1859 as President Judge of Saratoga County. He was to hold office until the county's first popular election was held on January 2, 1860.

== See also ==
- Outline of Colorado
- Index of Colorado-related articles
- Grand County, Colorado
- Historic Colorado counties
- History of Colorado
- Pike's Peak Gold Rush
- State of Colorado
- Territory of Colorado
- Territory of Jefferson
