= Fountain County, Jefferson Territory =

Fountain County was a county of the extralegal United States Territory of Jefferson that existed from November 28, 1859, until February 28, 1861.

== History ==
In July 1858, gold was discovered along the South Platte River in Arapahoe County, Kansas Territory. This discovery precipitated the Pike's Peak Gold Rush. Many residents of the mining region felt disconnected from the remote territorial governments of Kansas and Nebraska, so they voted to form their own Territory of Jefferson on October 24, 1859. On November 28, the General Assembly of the Territory of Jefferson organized 12 counties: Arrappahoe County, Cheyenne County, El Paso County, Fountain County, Heele County, Jackson County, Jefferson County, Mountain County, North County, Park County, Saratoga County, and St. Vrain's County. The legislation that created Fountain County declared:

That the territory lying south of the main divide, between the headwaters of the Arkansas and the south Platte River, and lying east of the summit of the Rocky Mountains, and not included in El Paso county, be erected into a county to be called Fountain county.

Fountain County encompassed most of what is today the southeastern portion of the State of Colorado.

The Jefferson Territory never received federal sanction, but on February 28, 1861, U.S. President James Buchanan signed an act organizing the Territory of Colorado. On November 1, 1861, the Colorado General Assembly organized 17 counties for the new territory.

== See also ==
- Outline of Colorado
- Index of Colorado-related articles
- Baca County, Colorado
- Bent County, Colorado
- Historic Colorado counties
- History of Colorado
- Las Animas County, Colorado
- Otero County, Colorado
- Pike's Peak Gold Rush
- Prowers County, Colorado
- State of Colorado
- Territory of Colorado
- Territory of Jefferson
