= Uncompahgre County, Colorado =

Coordinates: 38°10′N 107°46′W

Uncompahgre County
- County of Colorado
- 1883
- Capital: Ouray
- Area
- History
  - Established: 27 February 1883
  - Disestablished: 2 March 1883
- Contained within
  - Country: United States
  - State: Colorado
Preceded by	Succeeded by
Ouray County	Ouray County
- Today part of: United States

Uncompahgre County was a short-lived county in the state of Colorado that existed between 27 February and 2 March 1883, briefly replacing Ouray County.

== History ==
On 27 February 1883, the Colorado General Assembly renamed Ouray County as Uncompahgre County. It was named after the Uncompahgre Ute people, a band of Native American tribe Ute. Three days later on 2 March 1883, the General Assembly changed its mind and changed the name of Uncompahgre County back to Ouray County.

== See also ==
- Outline of Colorado
- Index of Colorado-related articles
- List of counties in Colorado
  - Ouray County, Colorado
