= Arrappahoe County, Jefferson Territory =

Coordinates: 39.7392°N 104.9850°W

Arapahoe County was a county of the extralegal United States Territory of Jefferson that existed from November 28, 1859, until February 28, 1861. The county name was also spelled Arapaho County, Arapahoe County, Arrapahoe County, and Arappahoe County. The county seat was Denver City.

== History ==
In July 1858, gold was discovered along the South Platte River in Arapahoe County, Kansas Territory. This discovery precipitated the Pike's Peak Gold Rush. Many residents of the mining region felt disconnected from the remote territorial governments of Kansas and Nebraska, so they voted to form their own Territory of Jefferson on October 24, 1859. On November 28, the General Assembly of the Territory of Jefferson organized 12 counties: Arapahoe County, Cheyenne County, El Paso County, Fountain County, Heele County, Jackson County, Jefferson County, Mountain County, North County, Park County, Saratoga County, and St. Vrain's County. The legislation that created Arapahoe County declared:

That the territory comprised within the following limits, be erected into a county to be called Arappahoe county: commencing at a point where the 40th parallel of north latitude crosses the 104th meridian of west longitude; thence west on said parallel to the centre of the main channel of the south fork of the Platte River, thence upon the main channel of said stream to the mouth of Clear Creek; thence up the main channel of Clear Creek to the mouth of Ralston's Creek; thence in a straight line to a point where Montana Creek joins the main channel of the Platte; thence up the main channel of said stream to the mouth of the canon at the base of the mountains, thence on the main divide between the waters of the Arkansas and the Platte River, to where the 104th meridian of longitude crosses the same, thence north on said meridian to the place of beginning.

Arapahoe County was named for the Arapaho Nation of Native Americans that lived in the region. Denver City served as the county seat of Arapahoe County and was the territorial capital until November 12, 1860.

The Jefferson Territory never received federal sanction, but on February 28, 1861, U.S. President James Buchanan signed an act organizing the Territory of Colorado. On November 1, 1861, the Colorado General Assembly organized 17 counties, including Arapahoe County, for the new Colorado Territory. On November 15, 1902, the State of Colorado split Arapahoe County into three new counties: the City and County of Denver, Adams County, and South Arapahoe County (soon to revert to Arapahoe County).

== Elections And Elected Officials ==
Arapahoe County's first office holding official was William M. Slaughter, appointed by Governor Robert Williamson Steele in December 1859 as President Judge of Arapahoe County. He was to hold office until the county's first popular election was held on January 2, 1860.

== See also ==
- Outline of Colorado
- Index of Colorado-related articles
- Historic Colorado counties
  - Arapahoe County, Kansas Territory
  - Arapahoe County, Jefferson Territory
  - Arapahoe County, Colorado
  - Adams County, Colorado
  - City and County of Denver, Colorado
  - South Arapahoe County, Colorado
- History of Colorado
- Pike's Peak Gold Rush
- State of Colorado
- Territory of Colorado
- Territory of Jefferson
