= El Paso County, Jefferson Territory =

Coordinates: 38.8509°N 104.8687°W

El Paso County was a county of the extralegal United States Territory of Jefferson that existed from November 28, 1859, until February 28, 1861. The county seat was Colorado City.

== History ==
In July 1858, gold was discovered along the South Platte River in Arapahoe County, Kansas Territory. This discovery precipitated the Pike's Peak Gold Rush. Many residents of the mining region felt disconnected from the remote territorial governments of Kansas and Nebraska, so they voted to form their own Territory of Jefferson on October 24, 1859. On November 28, the General Assembly of the Territory of Jefferson organized 12 counties: Arrappahoe County, Cheyenne County, El Paso County, Fountain County, Heele County, Jackson County, Jefferson County, Mountain County, North County, Park County, Saratoga County, and St. Vrain's County. The legislation that created El Paso County declared:

That the territory comprised within the following limits be erected into a county to be called El Paso county: commencing in the main channel of the south fork of Platte River, at the south west corner of Arrappahoe county, thence easterly on the main divide between the head waters of the Arkansas and Platte Rivers twenty-five miles; thence south seventy-five miles; thence west to the summit of the Rocky Mountains; thence northwardly on the said range to the south Platte River, thence down the main channel of said stream to the place of beginning.

El Paso County was named for the Spanish language name for Ute Pass north of Pikes Peak.

The Jefferson Territory never received federal sanction, but on February 28, 1861, U.S. President James Buchanan signed an act organizing the Territory of Colorado. On November 1, 1861, the Colorado General Assembly organized 17 counties, including El Paso County and Pueblo County, for the new Colorado Territory.

== See also ==
- Outline of Colorado
- Index of Colorado-related articles
- El Paso County, Colorado
- Historic Colorado counties
- History of Colorado
- Pike's Peak Gold Rush
- Pueblo County, Colorado
- State of Colorado
- Territory of Colorado
- Territory of Jefferson
