= Cheyenne County, Jefferson Territory =

Cheyenne County was a county of the extralegal United States Territory of Jefferson that existed from November 28, 1859, until February 28, 1861.

Cheyenne County occupied the region that today includes the City of Cheyenne, Wyoming. Cheyenne County was named for the Cheyenne Nation of Native Americans that lived in the area.

== History ==
In July 1858, gold was discovered along the South Platte River in Arapahoe County, Kansas Territory. This discovery precipitated the Pike's Peak Gold Rush. Many residents of the mining region felt disconnected from the remote territorial governments of Kansas and Nebraska, so they voted to form their own Territory of Jefferson on October 24, 1859. On November 28, the General Assembly of the Territory of Jefferson organized 12 counties: Arrappahoe County, Cheyenne County, El Paso County, Fountain County, Heele County, Jackson County, Jefferson County, Mountain County, North County, Park County, Saratoga County, and St. Vrain's County. The legislation that created Cheyenne County declared:

That a county to be called Cheyenne, be and is hereby erected, including that portion of territory lying within the following limits: commencing in the main channel of the south fork of the Platte River, where the 104th meridian of west longitude crosses the same, thence north with said 104 meridian of longitude to where the same crosses Lodge Pole Creek, thence west up the main channel of said creek to the summit of the Black Hills; then south upon the summit of said Hills to the north west corner of Heele county, thence east along the north line of said county to its north east corner; thence south to the Cache La Poudre Creek, thence south down the main channel of said creek to its junction with the South Platte River, thence down the main channel of the Platte to the place of beginning.

The Jefferson Territory never received federal sanction. On February 28, 1861, the Territory of Colorado was organized, and on July 25, 1868, the Territory of Wyoming was organized.

== See also ==
- Outline of Wyoming
- Index of Wyoming-related articles
- History of Wyoming
- Laramie County, Wyoming
- Pike's Peak Gold Rush
- State of Wyoming
- Territory of Jefferson
- Territory of Wyoming
