= Colorado Organic Act =

1861 US federal legislation organizing Colorado Territory

The Colorado Organic Act was enacted in Colorado Territory in 1861. It passed by Congress and signed by President James Buchanan on February 28, 1861, and established four-year terms for Governor, Secretary and Legislative Assembly of the territory and defined their duties. Provisions were made for delegates to the United States Congress, county and township officials, schools, courts, census-taking, and elections. Eligibility for voting was stipulated as white male residents over the age of 21. It preserved the rights of Native Americans. The bill was reported from the Senate Committee on Territories by Sen. Green (D-MO) on April 3, 1860. It was amended in 1863 and 1867, and revised in 1867, primarily focusing on legal rights and procedures.

It was created as the free Territory of Colorado. The new territory was created from the Former unorganized territory previously part of the Territory of Kansas, the northern portion of the Territory of New Mexico, the eastern portion of the Territory of Utah, and the southwestern portion of the Territory of Nebraska. The name of the territory was chosen because the Colorado River was thought to originate somewhere in the territory, though much of the geography of the area was only mapped and explored by Americans in the two decades later, for example through the United States Geological and Geographical Survey of the Territories.

The boundaries of the Colorado Territory were essentially the same as the present State of Colorado.
