= North County, Jefferson Territory =

Coordinates: 40.66°N 106.34°W

North County was a county of the extralegal United States Territory of Jefferson that existed from November 28, 1859, until February 28, 1861.

== History ==
In July 1858, gold was discovered along the South Platte River in Arapahoe County, Kansas Territory. This discovery precipitated the Pike's Peak Gold Rush. Many residents of the mining region felt disconnected from the remote territorial governments of Kansas and Nebraska, so they voted to form their own Territory of Jefferson on October 24, 1859. On November 28, the General Assembly of the Territory of Jefferson organized 12 counties: Arrappahoe County, Cheyenne County, El Paso County, Fountain County, Heele County, Jackson County, Jefferson County, Mountain County, North County, Park County, Saratoga County, and St. Vrain's County. The legislation that created North County declared:

That the territory comprised within the limits of what is known as the North Park, be erected into a county to be called North county.

North County was named for North Park and encompassed what is today Jackson County, Colorado.

The Jefferson Territory never received federal sanction, but on February 28, 1861, U.S. President James Buchanan signed an act organizing the Territory of Colorado. On November 1, 1861, the Colorado General Assembly organized 17 counties for the new Colorado Territory.

== See also ==
- Outline of Colorado
- Index of Colorado-related articles
- Historic Colorado counties
- History of Colorado
- Jackson County, Colorado
- Pike's Peak Gold Rush
- State of Colorado
- Territory of Colorado
- Territory of Jefferson
