= Guadalupe, Colorado =

Unincorporated community in Colorado, US

- Unincorporated community
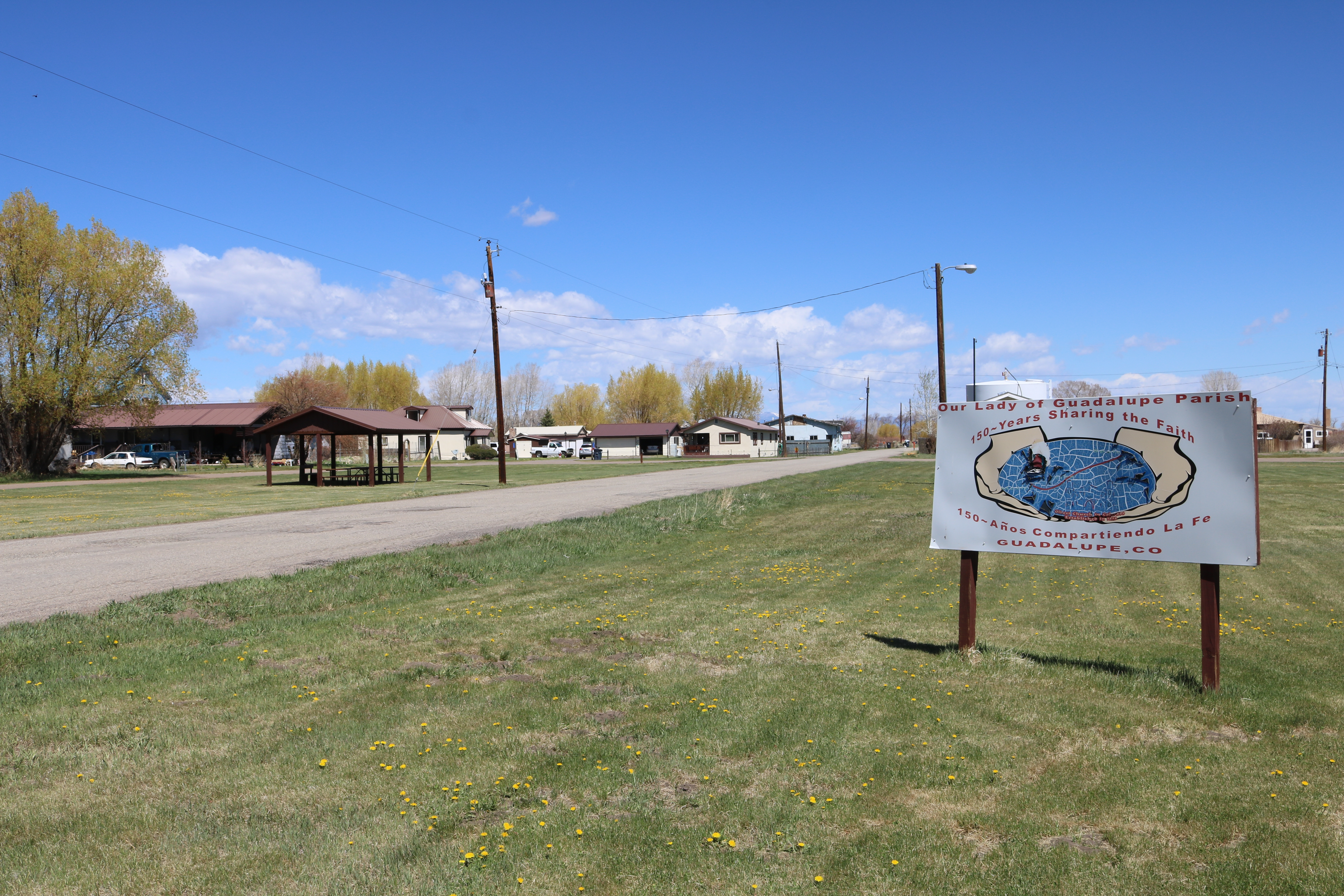
- Guadalupe Plaza
- Etymology: Named for the Our Lady of Guadalupe
- Nickname: Guadalupe Plaza
- Location of Guadalupe, Colorado. Guadalupe (Colorado)
- Coordinates: 37.0953°N 106.0256°W
- Country: United States
- State: Colorado
- County: Conejos

Government
  - Type: unincorporated community
  - Body: Conejos County
- Elevation: 7,901 ft (2,408 m)
- Time zone: UTC−07:00 (MST)
  - Summer (DST): UTC−06:00 (MDT)
- ZIP code: (Antonito) 81120
- Area code: 719
- GNIS place ID: 190914

Guadalupe is an unincorporated community in Conejos County, in the U.S. state of Colorado.

The community, which is centered on a grassy plaza, is located on the north bank of the Conejos River, just north of Conejos, Colorado, along Conejos County Road 13.

== History ==
Guadalupe was among the first settlements in the San Luis Valley. It was founded by Lafayette Head in 1854 in what was then Taos County, New Mexico Territory.

The Territory of Colorado was organized on February 28, 1861. On November 1, 1861, the Territorial Legislature created Guadaloupe County with Guadalupe as the county seat. Six days later, the legislature changed the county name to Conejos County. Fearing flooding, the Conejos, Colorado Territory, post office opened on February 25, 1862, at a sight 3 feet (1 m) higher across the Conejos River. In 1863, Conejos County moved its county seat 0.6 miles (1.0 km) across the Conejos River to the newer town of Conejos.

== Geography ==
Guadalupe is located in Conejos County at coordinates 37.0953°N 106.0256°W and elevation 7,901 feet (2,408 m).

== See also ==
- Alamosa, CO Micropolitan Statistical Area
- List of county seats in Colorado
- List of populated places in Colorado
