= Jefferson Territory =

Extralegal U.S. Territory of Jefferson that existed from 1859 to 1861

Coordinates: 40.00°N 106.00°W

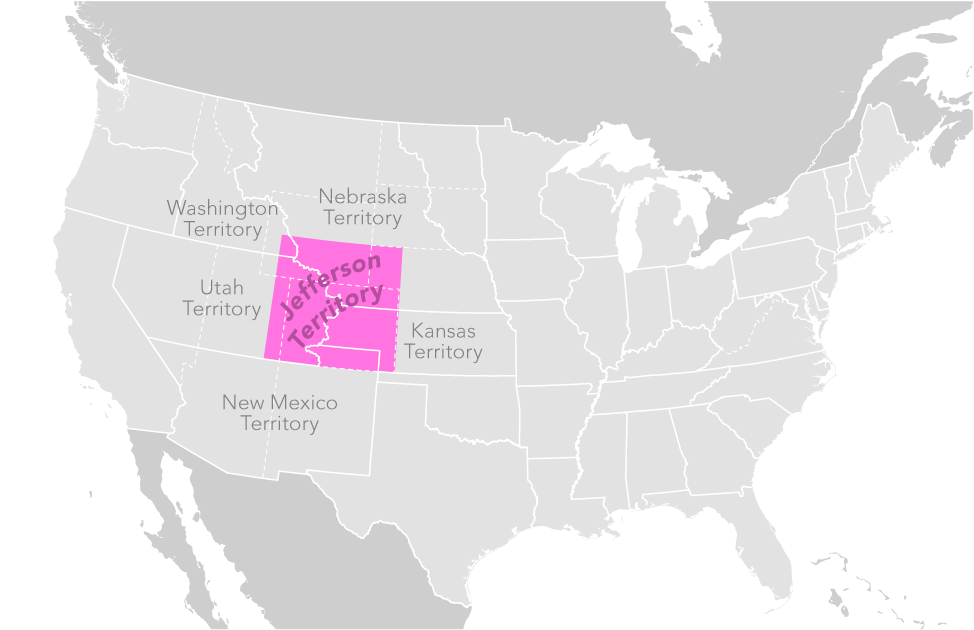
Location of the extralegal Territory of Jefferson in the United States of America of 1861

The Provisional Government of the Territory of Jefferson was an extralegal and unrecognized United States territory that existed in the Pike's Peak mining region from October 24, 1859, until it yielded to the new Territory of Colorado on June 6, 1861. The Jefferson Territory included all of the present State of Colorado and portions of the present states of Kansas, Nebraska, Utah, and Wyoming. The people were desirous of a closer government than those five territories provided.

The government of the Jefferson Territory, while democratically elected, was never legally recognized by the United States government, although it managed the territory with relatively free rein for 19 months. Many of the laws enacted by the General Assembly of the Territory of Jefferson were reenacted and given official sanction by the new Colorado General Assembly in 1861.

== Origins ==
On August 25, 1855, the Kansas Territory created Arapahoe County, a huge county that included the entire western portion of Kansas to the Rocky Mountains. The boundaries of Arapahoe County were defined as: beginning at the northeast corner of New Mexico, running thence north to the south line of Nebraska and north line of Kansas; thence along said line to the east line of Utah Territory; thence along said line between Utah and Kansas territories, to where said line strikes New Mexico; thence along the line between said New Mexico and the territory of Kansas to the place of beginning.

Occupied primarily by Cheyenne and Arapaho Indians with few white settlers, the county was never organized. The leaders of the Kansas Territory were preoccupied with the violent events of Bleeding Kansas, so little time or attention was available to attend to the needs of the far western portion of the territory. The question of whether to admit Kansas to the union as a slave state or free state dominated discussion in the populous eastern portion of the territory and led to three failed constitutional proposals between 1855 and 1858 (the Topeka, Lecompton and Leavenworth constitutions). The United States Congress was likewise preoccupied with threats of secession by the slave states.

In July 1858, the Pike's Peak Gold Rush began with the discovery of gold at the Dry Creek Diggings in Arapahoe County, Kansas Territory (now Englewood in Arapahoe County, Colorado). The gold rush brought 100,000 gold seekers to the area known as the Pike's Peak Country, which included Arapahoe County as well as the unorganized southwestern corner of the Nebraska Territory and parts of the New Mexico and Utah territories.

On February 7, 1859, the Kansas Territorial Legislature replaced Arapahoe County with six new unorganized counties and appointed county commissioners for each. The governments were provided with no funds and had no significant effect. The settlers in the region attempted to organize a county on their own and on March 28, 1859, an election was held to elect officers. A total of 774 votes were cast, including 231 from Auraria and 144 from Denver City. A desire for a new territorial government kept the elected officials from taking their offices, as doing so would have given recognition to the Kansas Territorial government. In the meantime, Hiram J Graham, the local delegate to Congress, had introduced a bill to establish a new territory in Pike's Peak Country. Though the bill did not pass, it nevertheless encouraged settlers to establish a separate government themselves.

== Establishment ==
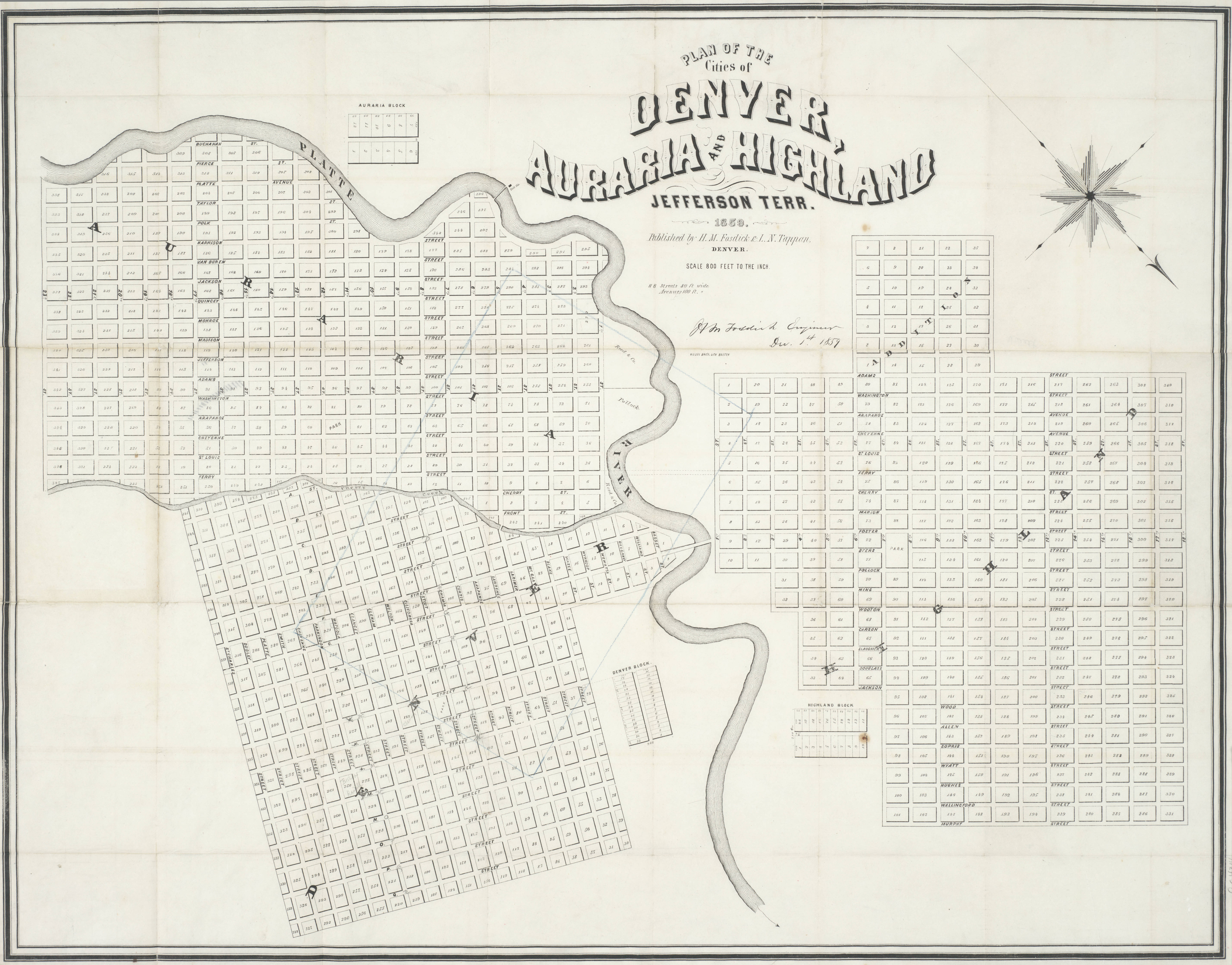
Plan of the cities of Denver, Auraria, and Highland, Jefferson Territory; Auraria and Highland, 1859

In April 1859, a small convention was held at Wootton's Hall in Auraria about the need for a local government. The name Jefferson (in honor of Thomas Jefferson) was chosen and a constitutional convention was scheduled for June 6, 1859. Thomas Jefferson was given the honor due to his role in organizing the Louisiana Purchase. The convention struggled to form consensus and adjourned until August 1, 1859, when 167 representatives from 37 districts met to draft a constitution for Jefferson State. The state constitution was subsequently rejected in a popular referendum on September 24 in favor of creating a territory, primarily because the organization of the territory would be funded by Congress while the organization of a state would be self-funded. The original authors determined to hold another convention on October 3 to draft a provisional constitution for the Territory of Jefferson.

The proposed Territory of Jefferson included all of the present State of Colorado, but it was 70 percent more extensive. The territory had the same southern boundary as the present State of Colorado, the 37th parallel north, but the northern boundary was set at the 43rd parallel north, 138 miles (222 km) farther north than Colorado's current northern boundary, the 41st parallel north. In addition the eastern boundary was located about 2.7 miles (4.3 km) farther east at the 102nd meridian west, and the western boundary about 50 miles (80 km) farther west at the 110th meridian west. The territory was divided into eight council districts and 19 representative districts.

On October 24, 1859, an election was held to approve the formation of the Provisional Government of the Territory of Jefferson and to elect officials for the territory. The poll tax was one dollar and only white men were allowed to vote. The formation of a provisional government was approved by a vote of 1,852 to 280 and the following officials were elected:

Officials of the Provisional Government of the Territory of Jefferson 1859–1861
Office	Officer
Governor	Robert W. Steele
Secretary	Lucien W. Bliss
Treasurer	George W. Cook
Attorney General	Samuel McLean
Chief Justice	A.J. Allison
Associate Justice	John M. Odell
Associate Justice	E. Fitzgerald
Clerk of Supreme Court	Oscar B. Totten
Marshal	John L. Merrick
Superintendent of Public Instruction	H.H. McAffee
Auditor	C.R. Bissell
US Congressional Representative	Beverly D. Williams

== Existence ==
On November 7, 1859, Governor Robert Williamson Steele opened the first session of the provisional Jefferson Territorial Legislature in Denver City with the following proclamation:

Let us then enter upon our duties with a determination of spirit that conquers all difficulties: working for the benefit of the whole commonwealth, encouraging moderation and conservation in all our acts, that we may never be ashamed of having taken an humble part of the organization of a Provisional Government for the Territory of Jefferson.

During this first session, the legislature organized 12 counties. (The Colorado General Assembly would create 17 counties with somewhat similar boundaries in 1861.) The legislature adjourned on December 7, 1859. A one dollar poll tax was levied on December 19.

Many settlers from eastern Kansas preferred to be governed by that territory. Those resistant to the self-government of Jefferson Territory held an election on December 8, 1859, and elected Captain R. Sopris as their representative to the Kansas Territorial Legislature.

Governor Steele called the second session of the provisional Jefferson Territorial Legislature to meet at Denver City on January 23, 1860. This session created the South Platte River Improvement and Lumbering Company, the Consolidated Ditch Company, the Arapaho Ditch Company, the Denver Mutual Insurance Company, the Golden Gate Town Company, the St. Vrain, Golden City and Colorado Wagon Road Company, the Denver, Auraria and Colorado Wagon Road Company, the Cibola Hydraulic Company, Boulder City, Gold Hill and Left Hand Creek Wagon Road Company, a Wagon Road Company from Auraria and Denver Cities to the South Park, Fountain City Bridge Company, the Clear Creek Lumbering Company. These state sanctioned corporations built rudimentary infrastructure like wagon roads and ditches which they charged tolls to use.

Many disappointed gold seekers left the region in 1860. The United States census of 1860 counted approximately 35,000 persons in the region of the Jefferson Territory. Governor Steele pointed out that many gold seekers were working claims in remote areas and estimated that the total number of people in the Jefferson Territory was 60,000.

The territory lost legitimacy and was unable to hold the support of the Denver electorate in 1860. Real estate title and other serious business transactions were conducted under the jurisdiction of Kansas Territory. Anyone other than white men were excluded from the legal system.

The legislature also created a tax on every occupation other than mining or farming. However, there was little executive power to enforce the laws against anyone who resisted.

Golden City had become a leading economic and political center of the region. Its geographic location made it a center of trade between the gold fields to the west and settlements to the east. Golden City was established on June 16, 1859, along Clear Creek west of Denver. The city is named after Thomas L. Golden. Other important businessmen and prospectors like William A.H. Loveland and George West were among the first people to settle in Golden.

By the end of 1860, Golden City had been popularly elected the seat of Jefferson County and was capital of Jefferson Territory. As drafted in the territorial constitution, the capital of the Jefferson Territory was initially proposed to be Golden, then with a population of 700, as a result of its proximity to mountain mining towns, and greater ability to hold a congressional quorum than had Denver.

== Counties ==
On November 28, 1859, the Territory of Jefferson created 12 counties:

1. Arrappahoe County, county seat Denver City, evolved into Arapahoe and Douglas counties, Colorado Territory.
2. Cheyenne County evolved into southern Laramie County, Wyoming Territory.
3. El Paso County, county seat Colorado City, evolved into El Paso County, Colorado Territory.
4. Fountain County, county seat Pueblo, evolved into Pueblo, Fremont, and Huerfano counties, Colorado Territory.
5. Heele County, county seat La Porte, evolved into eastern Larimer County, Colorado Territory.
6. Jackson County, county seat Boulder City, evolved into Boulder County, Colorado Territory
7. Jefferson County, county seat Arapahoe City, evolved into Jefferson County, Colorado Territory
8. Mountain County, county seat Central City, evolved into Gilpin and Clear Creek counties, Colorado Territory.
9. North County evolved into western Larimer County, Colorado Territory.
10. Park County, county seat Tarryall City, evolved into Park County, Colorado Territory.
11. Saratoga County, county seat Breckinridge, evolved into Summit County, Colorado Territory.
12. St. Vrain's County, county seat St. Vrain, evolved into Weld County, Colorado Territory.

== Capitals ==
- Denver City – October 24, 1859, to November 13, 1860.
- Golden City – November 13, 1860, to June 6, 1861.

Most administrative affairs of the Territory of Jefferson were handled at the home of Governor Steele at Mount Vernon.

== Dissolution ==
On February 26, 1861, Congress passed a bill organizing the Territory of Colorado. The bill was signed into law by U.S. President James Buchanan two days later on February 28, 1861. On May 29, 1861, William Gilpin, newly appointed Governor of the Territory of Colorado, arrived in Denver City. Most citizens of the region welcomed their new government. On June 6, 1861, Governor Steele issued a proclamation declaring the Territory of Jefferson disbanded and urging all employees and residents to abide by the laws governing the United States.

== See also ==
- Governor of the Territory of Jefferson
- History of Colorado
- List of territorial claims and designations in Colorado
- Territorial evolution of the United States
