= St. Vrain's County, Jefferson Territory =

1859–1861 county in the US territory of Jefferson

St. Vrain's County (or St. Vrain County) was a county of the extralegal United States Territory of Jefferson that existed from November 28, 1859, until February 28, 1861.

== History ==
In July 1858, gold was discovered along the South Platte River in Arapahoe County, Kansas Territory. This discovery precipitated the Pike's Peak Gold Rush. Many residents of the mining region felt disconnected from the remote territorial governments of Kansas and Nebraska, so they voted to form their own Territory of Jefferson on October 24, 1859. On November 28, the General Assembly of the Territory of Jefferson organized 12 counties: Arrappahoe County, Cheyenne County, El Paso County, Fountain County, Heele County, Jackson County, Jefferson County, Mountain County, North County, Park County, Saratoga County, and St. Vrain's County. The legislation that created St. Vrain's County declared:

That the territory comprised within the following limits, be erected into a county called St. Vrain's: commencing in the main channel of the south fork of the Platte River, where the 104th meridian of west longitude crosses the same, thence up the main channel of said stream to the mouth of the Cache la Poudre, thence up the main channel of the Cache la Poudre to the east line of Heele county, thence south to the 40th parallel of north latitude; thence east on said parallel to the 104th meridian of west longitude, thence north on said meridian to the place of beginning.

St. Vrain's County was named in honor of Ceran de Hault de Lassus de St. Vrain, the French trader who established the first trading post on the upper South Platte River. St. Vrain's County encompassed much of what is today Weld County, Colorado.

The Jefferson Territory never received federal sanction, but on February 28, 1861, U.S. President James Buchanan signed an act organizing the Territory of Colorado. On November 1, 1861, the Colorado General Assembly organized 17 counties, including Weld County, for the new Colorado Territory.

== Elections and elected officials ==
St. Vrain County's first office holding official was Corydon P. Hall, appointed by Governor Robert Williamson Steele in December 1859 as President Judge of St. Vrain County. He was to hold office until the county's first popular election was held on January 2, 1860.

== See also ==
- Outline of Colorado
- Index of Colorado-related articles
- Historic Colorado counties
- History of Colorado
- Pike's Peak Gold Rush
- State of Colorado
- Territory of Colorado
- Territory of Jefferson
- Weld County, Colorado
