= Greenwood County, Colorado Territory =

1870–1874 county of the Territory of Colorado

Greenwood County was a county of the Territory of Colorado that existed for four years from 1870 to 1874.

== History ==
On November 2, 1870, the Colorado General Assembly created Greenwood County from former Cheyenne and Arapaho Reserve and the eastern portion of Huerfano County. It was named for William Henry Greenwood, Chief of the Kansas Pacific Railway surveys to the Pacific. Later, with William Jackson Palmer, he organized the Denver & Rio Grande Railroad in 1870. On February 6, 1874, the Colorado General Assembly abolished Greenwood County and split its territory between Elbert County and Bent County.

== See also ==
- Outline of Colorado
- Index of Colorado-related articles
- Historic Colorado counties
  - Bent County, Colorado
  - Elbert County, Colorado
  - Huerfano County, Colorado
