= Dayton, Colorado =

Ghost town in Colorado, US

- Ghost town
- Location of Dayton, Colorado. Dayton (Colorado)
- Coordinates: 39°04′58″N 106°22′55″W
- Country: United States
- State: Colorado
- County: Lake

Dayton is an extinct town in Lake County, Colorado, located on the site of what is now Twin Lakes. Like the larger nearby towns of Granite and Oro City, Dayton formed rapidly during the Pike's Peak Gold Rush and failed quickly when the local mining industry collapsed.

== History ==
Prior to European exploration and colonization, the region was inhabited by the Ute people. The Dayton post office operated from October 16, 1866, until November 30, 1868. Dayton served as the Lake County seat from 1866 until 1868 when the county seat was moved to Granite. At its peak, it had hotels, a general store, and a courthouse. Dayton's courthouse was taken down and moved to Granite by early 1869. In the decade after Dayton's demise, the area became a vacation destination appreciated for its scenery, hunting, and fishing.

== See also ==
- Breckenridge, CO Micropolitan Statistical Area
- Early history of the Arkansas Valley in Colorado
