= Carbonate County, Colorado =

Coordinates: 39.20°N 106.34°W

Carbonate County
- Former county
- Colorado's location in the U.S.
- Country: United States
- State: Colorado
- Founded: February 8, 1879
- Time zone: UTC-7 (MST)
  - Summer (DST): UTC-6 (MDT)

Carbonate County was a county of the state of Colorado that existed for only two days in 1879. Carbonate County was created by renaming Lake County, Colorado.

== History ==
On 8 February 1879, the Colorado General Assembly renamed Lake County as Carbonate County. Two days later on 10 February 1879, the Colorado General Assembly split Carbonate County into the new Chaffee County and the renamed Lake County.

== See also ==
- Outline of Colorado
- Index of Colorado-related articles
- Historic Colorado counties
  - Chaffee County, Colorado
  - Lake County, Colorado
