= South Arapahoe County, Colorado =

Coordinates: 39.64°N 104.33°W

South Arapahoe County
- Former county
- Colorado's location in the U.S.
- Country: United States
- State: Colorado
- Founded: November 15, 1902
- Named for: Arapahoe County
- Time zone: UTC-7 (MST)
  - Summer (DST): UTC-6 (MDT)

South Arapahoe County was a county of the State of Colorado that existed for five months until it was renamed Arapahoe County in 1903.

== History ==
In 1901, the Colorado General Assembly voted to split Arapahoe County into three parts: a new consolidated City and County of Denver, a new Adams County, and the remainder of the Arapahoe County to be renamed South Arapahoe County. A ruling by the Colorado Supreme Court, subsequent legislation, and a referendum delayed the reorganization until 1902-11-15. On 1903-04-11, the Colorado General Assembly changed the name of South Arapahoe County back to Arapahoe County.

== See also ==
- Outline of Colorado
- Index of Colorado-related articles
- Historic Colorado counties
  - Arapahoe County, Kansas Territory
  - Arrappahoe County, Jefferson Territory
  - Arapahoe County, Colorado
