= Buckskin Joe, Park County, Colorado =

Ghost town in Park County, Colorado, United States

Buckskin Joe, Colorado Laurette, Buckskin
- Ghost town
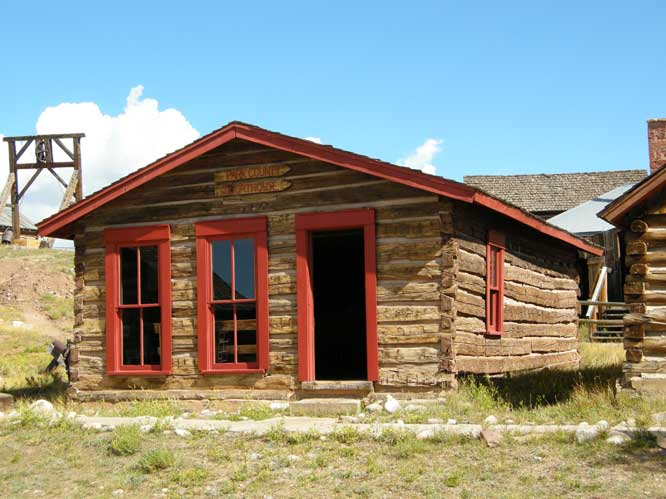
- The Park County courthouse, originally built in Buckskin Joe, was later moved to Fairplay, and is now in the South Park City Museum in Fairplay.

- Location of Buckskin Joe, Colorado. Buckskin Joe (Colorado)
- Coordinates: 38°28′35″N 105°19′37″W
- Country: United States
- State: Colorado
- County: Park County
- Elevation: 10,761 ft (3,280 m)
- Time zone: UTC-7 (MST)
  - Summer (DST): UTC-6 (MDT)
- GNIS feature: 191852

Buckskin Joe is an extinct gold mining town located in Park County, Colorado, United States. The town was founded in 1860 as Laurette, Kansas Territory. The Territory of Colorado was created in 1861, and Laurette served as the county seat of the Park County, Colorado Territory, from January 7, 1862, until November 7, 1867. On December 21, 1865, the Laurette, Colorado Territory, post office was renamed Buckskin, although the town was popularly known as Buckskin Joe.

== History ==
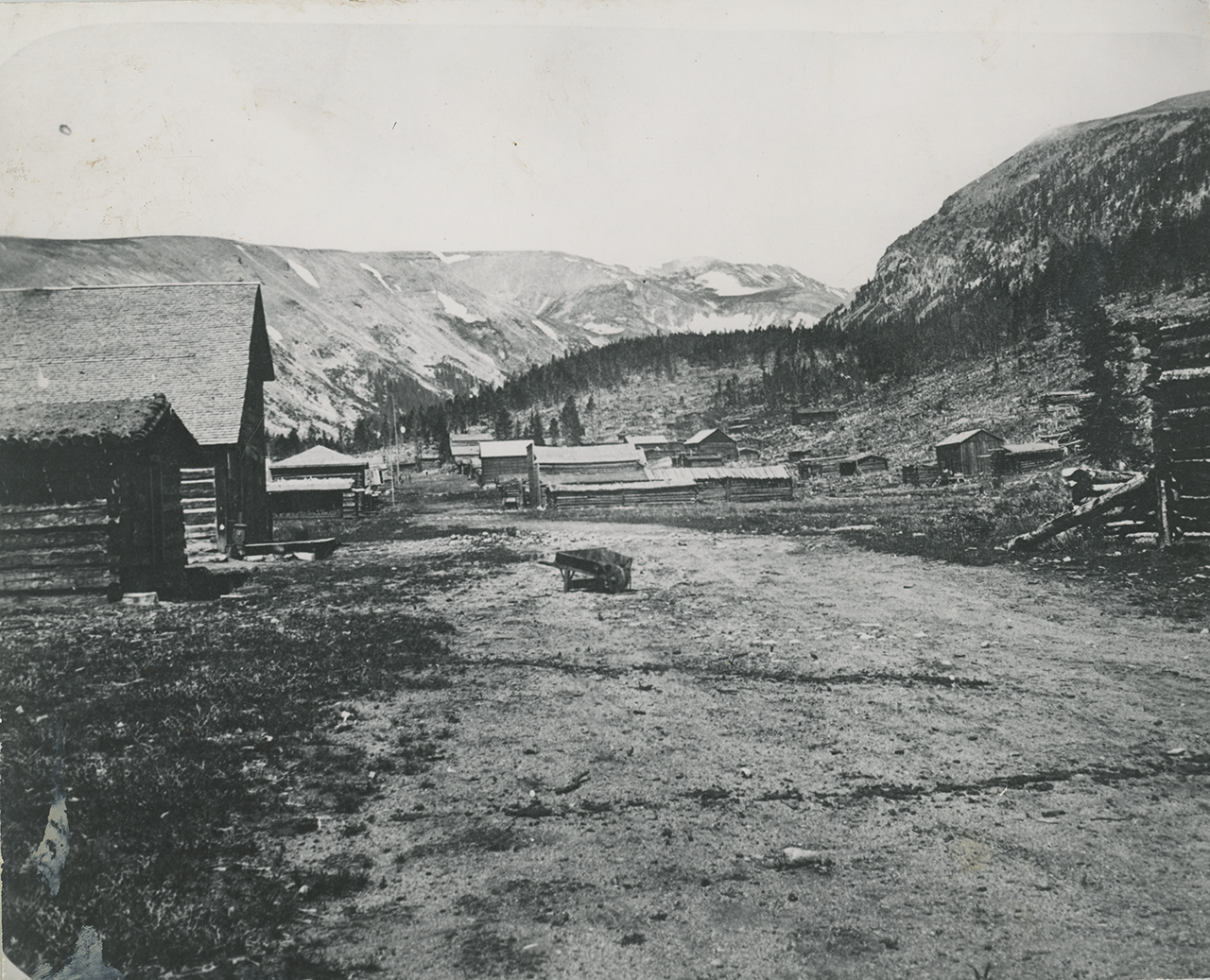
Laurette in 1864

The area was first inhabited by white Americans in 1859 during the Pikes Peak Gold Rush, when gold was discovered along Buckskin Creek, on the east side of the Mosquito Range. At the time of its first settlement, the town was in the western part of Kansas Territory.

The town was founded in 1860 as Laurette, Kansas Territory, its name a contraction of the first names of the only two women in the camp, the sisters Laura and Jeanette Dodge. But it was always more popularly known as Buckskin Joe, after Joseph Higginbottom, an early trapper and prospector. Little is known for certain about Higginbottom. Some accounts refer to him as an African-American; some accounts say that he was the one who first discovered gold in the vicinity of the town.

The Territory of Colorado was organized on February 28, 1861, and on November 1, 1861, Park County, Colorado Territory was created with Tarryall as the county seat. The Laurette, Colorado Territory, post office opened on November 14, 1861, and on January 7, 1862, Park County voters moved the county seat from Tarryall to Laurette. The post office name was changed to Buckskin on December 21, 1865, although the town was popularly known as Buckskin Joe. On November 7, 1867, voters moved the county seat to Fairplay. The Buckskin post office finally closed on January 24, 1873.

Mining shifted to rich hardrock deposits in the Phillips lode and other veins. By 1861, when the Laurette/Buckskin Joe Post Office opened, in the newly formed Colorado Territory, the town boasted two hotels, fourteen stores, and a bank. On January 7, 1862, the county seat of Park County moved to Buckskin Joe from Tarryall, now also a ghost town. At its peak, the town was credited with a population of 5,000, but historian Robert L. Brown considers this number far too large.

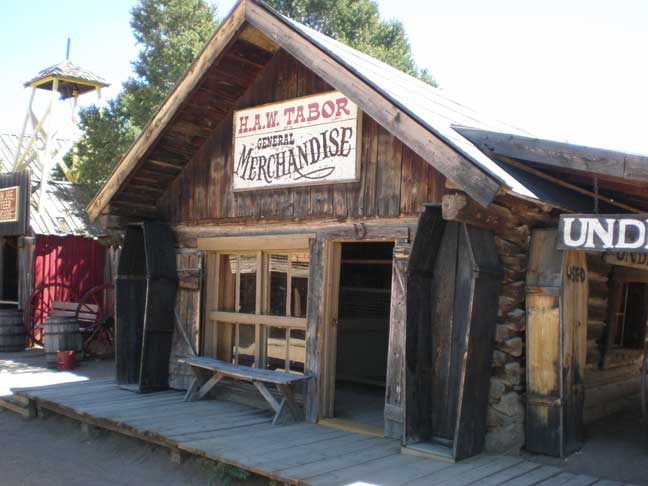
Tabor's store, previously located in the Buckskin Joe movie set and theme park near Cañon City, Colorado and later sold to a private collector

The placer and vein gold deposits were rich, but were quickly exhausted. By 1866, the town was reported to be deserted, and the courthouse building was moved down the valley to the new county seat of Fairplay. In the late 1950s, Horace Tabor's general store was dismantled, hauled away, and reassembled at the tourist attraction and movie set also called Buckskin Joe, 70 miles (110 km) away from the original site. It remained there until 2011 when it, along with the entire tourist attraction and movie set, was sold to a private collector and moved to a private ranch in western Colorado.

== Geography ==
Buckskin Joe is located approximately 2 miles (3 km) west of Alma, Colorado.

== Notable residents ==
- John Lewis Dyer, Methodist circuit rider missionary, arrived in Buckskin Joe in 1861, having migrated from Minnesota.
- Horace Tabor, later a mining millionaire and U.S. senator, arrived in Buckskin Joe in 1861 and ran a store with his first wife.

== See also ==
- Front Range Urban Corridor
- List of ghost towns in Colorado
