= Tarryall, Colorado (ghost town) =

Coordinates: 39.1219°N 105.4756°W

Tarryall is a ghost town in northwest Park County, Colorado, United States. It is on upper Tarryall Creek northwest of Como, Colorado. It was once the county seat of Park County, but is now completely deserted.

== History ==
The town was founded in 1859 during the Colorado Gold Rush after the discovery of placer gold in Tarryall Creek. The "Tarryall diggings", as well as other discoveries, prompted a flood of prospectors into South Park via Ute Pass and Kenosha Pass. Most newly arriving miners found that all available land for mining along the Tarryall Creek had been claimed by earlier arrivals, and much resentment ensued. It was thought that the earlier miners had claimed much more land than a man could reasonably work, and latecomers called Tarryall "Grab All". Another mining town, founded not far away on the Middle Fork of the South Platte River, was named Fairplay as a dig at Tarryall.

A US post office opened in Tarryall on 4 January 1860. The town briefly served as the county seat of Park County, from the organization of the county on November 1, 1861, until the county seat was moved to Laurette (now also a ghost town) on January 7, 1862.

The town was near the junction of North and Middle Tarryall Creeks. At its height, Tarryall had a population of several thousand. A marker along U.S. Highway 285 near Como where it crosses Tarryall Creek commemorates the Tarryall diggings and the former town. Decades later a new town named Tarryall was founded 29 miles (46.7 km) southeast of the original, and similarly deserted.

== See also ==
- Bibliography of Colorado
- Geography of Colorado
- History of Colorado
- Index of Colorado-related articles
- List of Colorado-related lists
  - List of ghost towns in Colorado
- Outline of Colorado
