= Robert Williamson Steele =

American politician

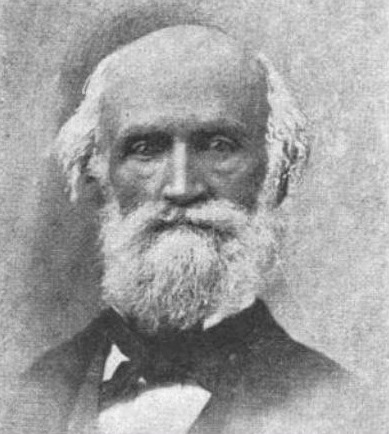

Governor of the Territory of Jefferson (Extra-legal)
- In office November 7, 1859 – June 6, 1861
- Preceded by: Various (Territory split between Kansas, Nebraska, New Mexico, and Utah territories)
- Succeeded by: William Gilpin (as Governor of the Territory of Colorado)

Personal details
- Born: January 14, 1820 Chillicothe, Ohio, US
- Died: February 7, 1901 (aged 81) Colorado Springs, Colorado, US
- Party: Democratic
- Spouse: Susan Willis Russel
- Children: 4
- Profession: Miner, businessman, politician

Robert Williamson Steele (January 14, 1820 – February 7, 1901) was governor of the extralegal Territory of Jefferson, which existed in the western United States from 1859 to 1861, when it was replaced by the Territory of Colorado.

== Early life ==
Steele was born near Chillicothe in Ross County, Ohio. He farmed until 1846, when he began the study of law at Fairfield, Iowa. In 1848 he married Susan Nevin at Hillsboro, Ohio, and graduated from the Law School of Cincinnati four years later. In 1855, Steele moved to Omaha, settling in Douglas County of the Nebraska Territory. He was elected as a Democrat to the Nebraska Territorial House of Representatives to represent Douglas County in 1857.

The following year, news reached Omaha of gold discovered along the South Platte River. On March 25, 1859, Steele set out for the gold fields with his wife Susan and four children in an ox-drawn prairie schooner. They arrived at Denver City in May. Steele soon moved to Central City, where he prospected for gold. He also served as president of the Consolidated Ditch Company. Steele built a log cabin on the Ute Trail midway between Denver City and Central City; he named the spot Mount Vernon in honor of George Washington.

== Territorial Governor ==
On September 29, 1859, Steele was nominated for Governor of the proposed Territory of Jefferson. On October 24, 1859 the formation of a provisional government was approved and Steele defeated J.H. St. Matthew for Governor.

Governor Steele opened the first session of the provisional territorial legislature on November 7, 1859, with a proclamation:

Let us then enter upon our duties with a determination of spirit that conquers all difficulties: working for the benefit of the whole commonwealth, encouraging moderation and conservation in all our acts, that we may never be ashamed of having taken an humble part of the organization of a Provisional Government for the Territory of Jefferson.

Steele called for the next session to meet on January 23, 1860.

Also in 1860, he formed the Apex and Gregory Wagon Road Company to build a toll road from Denver City to the gold fields at Gregory Gulch. It was later renamed the Denver City, Mt. Vernon, and Gregory Toll Road. When Steeles' home accidentally burned, the family rebuilt at Apex, on the toll road.

Governor Steele attempted to deal with the officials of the Kansas Territory, which was still the recognized government over the region. On August 7, 1860, Steele requested the Provisional Government of the Jefferson Territory be merged into the Kansas Territory. However, Kansas officials refused to agree and the stalemate continued.

== End of the Territory of Jefferson ==
On November 6, 1860, Abraham Lincoln won the U.S. presidential election, which precipitated the secession of seven slave states and the formation of the Confederate States of America. This ended any chance for federal endorsement of the Territory of Jefferson. Furthermore, as a staunch pro-Union Democrat and vocal opponent of both Lincoln and the Republican Party, R.W. Steele also became a pariah.

On January 26, 1861, the United States Congress passed a bill organizing the Territory of Colorado. It was signed into law by U.S. President James Buchanan two days later on January 28, 1861. On June 6, 1861, Governor Steele issued a proclamation disbanding the Territory of Jefferson and urging all residents to abide by the laws governing the United States.

== Later years ==
In 1862, Steele moved to Gilpin County, Colorado; in 1863 he moved again, first to Empire and then to Georgetown. In the fall of 1864 he opened the August Belmont, the first paying silver mine in Clear Creek County. In 1865, he reluctantly returned to Iowa. Just two years later, he returned to Georgetown. The one-time governor spent his last years in Colorado Springs, where he died on February 7, 1901, almost a month after his 81st birthday.

== Legacy ==
Steele has been called the Father of Colorado for his tireless efforts to develop the then frontier region. His 1867 home in Mt. Vernon, Colorado survives and is on the National Register of Historic Places.

== See also ==
- History of Colorado
- List of governors of Colorado
- Pike's Peak Gold Rush
- Territory of Jefferson
- List of governors of dependent territories in the 19th century
