= Central Overland California and Pikes Peak Express Company =

Stagecoach line

Central Overland California and Pike's Peak Express Company
- Company type: Stagecoach
- Industry: Transportation
- Predecessor: Leavenworth City and Pike's Peak Express Company
- Founded: February 13, 1860; 166 years ago in St. Joseph, Missouri, United States
- Founders: Alexander Majors; William Hepburn Russell; William Bradford Waddell
- Defunct: March 21, 1862; 164 years ago
- Fate: Bankrupt
- Headquarters: 601 Montgomery Street, San Francisco, California, United States
- Areas served: St. Joseph, Missouri, Denver, Salt Lake City
- Owner: Ben Holladay
- Subsidiaries: Pony Express

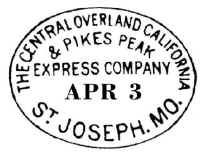
Postmark used on first Westbound Pony Express trip, April 3, 1860.

The Central Overland California and Pike's Peak Express Company was a stagecoach line that operated in the American West in the early 1860s, but it is most well known as the parent company of the Pony Express. It was formed as a subsidiary of the freighting company Russell, Majors, and Waddell, after the latter two partners bought out Russell's stage line, the Leavenworth and Pikes Peak Express Company. The stage line had made its first journey from Westport, Missouri, to Denver on March 9, 1859.

Its stage lines ran from St. Joseph, Missouri, to Denver and Salt Lake City and it succeeded the George Chorpenning contract for mail service from Utah to California in May 1860. In an attempt to win a more lucrative contract with the United States government, it started an express mail service between St. Joseph and San Francisco on April 3, 1860, known as the Pony Express.

Maintenance of frequent stage service and heavy losses from the Pony Express brought embarrassment to the C. O. C. & P. P. Express. When the Pony Express became obsolete upon completion of the Transcontinental Telegraph, the business ran out of cash and was sold to Ben Holladay for $100,000.

== Russell, Majors and Waddell ==
As the United States expanded westward in the early 19th century, the military erected forts and supply depots to protect and support this expansion. Initially the federal government contracted individuals or small companies to supply each post independently, but as the number of military posts continued to grow this system became increasingly time-consuming and inefficient. In 1854, Quartermaster General Thomas Jesup decided to change the system and implemented a single two-year contract to supply most of the posts west of the Missouri River. This consolidated contract was worth a lot of money and required more resources than many of the previous suppliers possessed.

Alexander Majors was one of the individuals contracted by the United States government to supply military forts prior to 1854. He hauled freight along the Santa Fe Trail and had a reputation for success. William Bradford Waddell was a store owner in Lexington, Missouri, who was described as "phlegmatic, stoical, ... a cautious penny-pincher, and unable to reach a decision without ponderous deliberation." In 1852 Waddell partnered in a wholesale trading firm with William Hepburn Russell, a good-looking entrepreneur of mixed success with social ambitions. In 1855, Waddell and Russell brought on Majors to go after the new military supply contract. Three months after forming their partnership, the firm of Russell, Majors, and Waddell received a two-year contract to supply all the military posts west of the Mississippi River.

The three partners divided the labor based on the skills that each member brought to the firm. William Waddell managed the finances and made sure that their business activities ran smoothly. William Russell was the company salesman, generating contracts with the government and others as well as dealing with bankers to secure financing. Alexander Major oversaw the freighting operations which included hiring labor, supervising the loading and transport of freight, and making sure the trains were operating on time. The relationship between the three men were generally fine; Majors and Waddell had a similar conservative temperament and though Russell was the opposite, he was often on the East Coast seeking new contracts and investments. With a virtual monopoly on all western freighting contracting Russell, Majors, and Waddell became the largest freighting company in western Missouri.

The new contract with the War Department required a great deal of investment. Warehouses, stables, corrals, and wagon shops needed to be built and maintained; Wagon masters, freight handlers, herders and teamsters needed to be hired, housed, and paid; Oxen, wagons, and other equipment had to be acquired, stored, and moved about. The division of labor between the three partners of Russell, Majors, and Waddell was an important component in their success and the experience gained in organizing and managing the freighting enterprise served them well in their future endeavors. Between 1855 and 1856, the first two years of their government contract, business prospered and the firm made a profit of $300,000. Russell, Majors, and Waddell diversified, buying land and opening new stores. The success of the firm in handling the War Department's freighting naturally made them the choice for the next round and in February 1857 they signed the second contract.

In May 1857, the firm's wagon trains had been on the road for over a month when the Utah War broke out between the Mormons and the United States government. The government assembled 2,500 troops to send to Utah and required Russell, Majors, and Waddell to gather additional "wagons to transport two and half to three million pounds of military freight" to send with them. The company financed the new expedition by taking out large loans and leaning heavily on their credit. Over the course of the Utah War three wagon trains, worth more than $125,000 at the time, were lost. Having already maxed out their credit the company could not find new financiers and was practically bankrupt. Adding to their difficulties was that Congress was unhappy with the war and did not pass the usual funding bill for the War Department which delayed payment for the 1857 contract. Despite this, the War Department required supplies and John B. Floyd, the Secretary of War, personally guaranteed the 1857 contract. Though an unusual situation, this allowed Russell, Majors, and Waddell to secure more credit and finance new supply trains.

== Leavenworth City & Pike's Peak Express Company ==
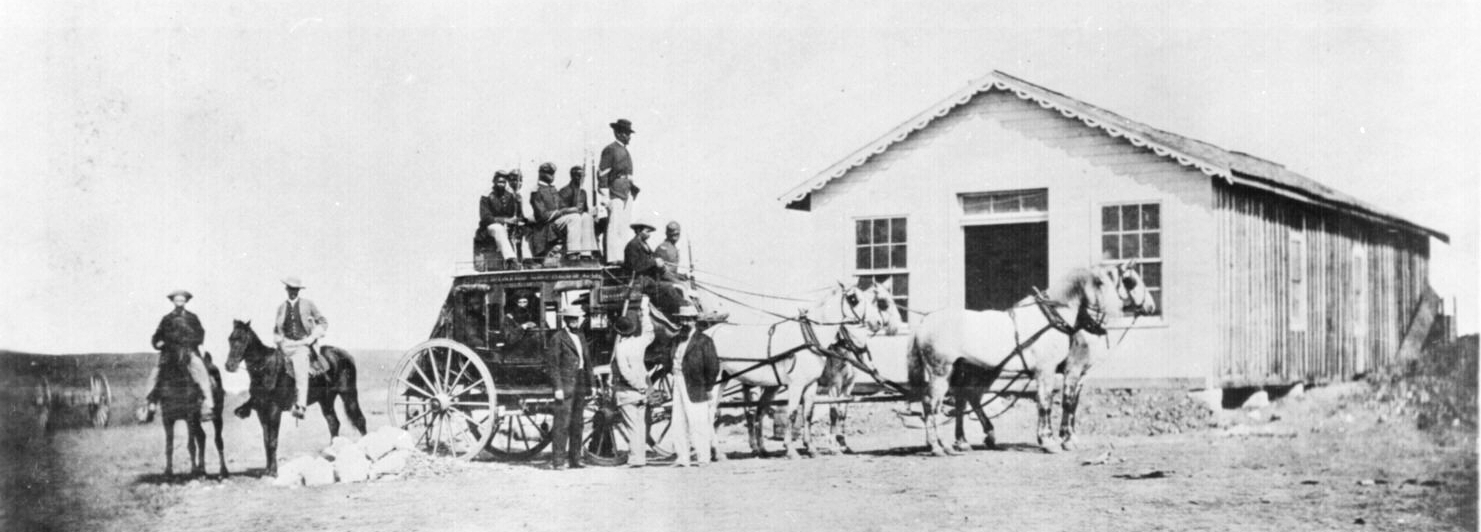
Typical stagecoach of the Concord type used by express companies on the overland trails. Soldiers guard from atop, ca. 1869

In July 1858, Green Russell and Sam Bates found a small amount of gold in Little Dry Creek, the first significant gold discovery in the Rocky Mountain region. This discovery signaled the start of the Pike's Peak Gold Rush. William H. Russell was in Leavenworth, Kansas, when he heard that gold had been found in the Rocky Mountains. Believing that this gold rush was the start of heavy emigration to the region, Russell, together with John S. Jones a former freighting partner, gathered new investors, borrowed money, and organized a stage and express line to run to Denver. The new service was called the Leavenworth City & Pike's Peak Express Company and transported "passengers, mail, freight, and gold" to and from the Pike's Peak area on a trail between the Republican and Smoky Hill forks of the Kansas River.

The new firm surveyed and laid out a 687-mile route, built twenty seven stations, bought new coaches and mules, and hired enough men to tend to all their holdings. The first trip occurred in March 1859 and took nineteen days, during which they finished constructing the route. Subsequent trips took as little as six days and cost $100.00 for a passenger ticket, $1.00 a pound for express packages, and 25¢ for each letter carried. The town of Denver had donated 53 lots to the Leavenworth City & Pike's Peak Express Company and celebrated the first arrival with an "extra" published by the Rocky Mountain News. The returning coach to Leavenworth brought with it $3,500 worth of gold and was celebrated with speeches and music.

While many people came to the Pike's Peak region, few could afford the cost of the stagecoach and instead traveled on foot or horseback. Russell and Jones wanted to make up the difference by securing a contract to deliver mail for the United States government. On May 11, 1859, the Leavenworth City & Pike's Peak Express Company purchased Hockaday & Company the firm that owned the postal contract between St. Joseph, Missouri, and Salt Lake City. Hockaday & Company consisted of only a few light stagecoaches and used only seven stations along the route from Missouri to Salt Lake City. The postal contract ran until November 1860 and had been profitable until the post office reduced the frequency of trips and payments for delivery.

After consolidating the two companies, Russell and Jones redirected their Denver coaches to Hockaday's more northern route, having run on their original route for less than six weeks. The new route of Leavenworth City & Pike's Peak Express traveled north to Fort Kearney and then turned south toward Denver at Julesburg, while the Salt Lake City traffic continued on via Fort Laramie and Fort Bridger. The route was divided into three sections; the first section ran from St. Joseph, Missouri, to where the lines split at Julesburg and contained nineteen stations. The second section consisted of the route from Julesburg to South Pass, while the third section ran from South Pass to Salt Lake City. The firm constructed new stations along the route, sixteen to forty miles apart, providing rooms and food for passengers and barns for mule teams. The construction of the new stations and the abandonment of the stations on the original route, were a financial burden on the company.

By the fall of 1859, the Leavenworth City & Pike's Peak Express Company's debts were threatening to collapse the firm. Employees were not being paid, stations ran low on feed, and the firm's creditors were owed more than $525,000. William H. Russell did not partner with Alexander Majors or William Waddell in the Leavenworth City & Pike's Peak Express Company; they thought it was too early to know whether the emigration would be sustained or merely a passing fad. That, however, did not stop Russell from using the reputation of Russell, Majors, and Waddell to secure credit for the Leavenworth City & Pike's Peak Express Company. This put a strain on the relationship of the three men especially since they had so recently avoided financial disaster with their War Department contracts.

Nevertheless, Majors and Waddell knew that if the Leavenworth City & Pike's Peak Express Company failed, it could bring down Russell, Majors, and Waddell as well. On October 28, 1859, the three men entered into a new partnership which assumed the assets and debts of the Leavenworth City & Pike's Peak Express Company. Less than a month later, and likely without consulting his partners, Russell named the new firm the Central Overland California & Pike's Peak Express Company or C.O.C. & P.P Express Co. The new name reflected his hope of securing a daily mail route to California along a central route through the Rocky Mountains. (The Southern Route traveled from St. Louis, Missouri, through El Paso, Texas, to San Francisco, California.) Russell headed back to New York in December to raise funds and hold off creditors. On January 27, 1860, he wrote his son: "Have determined to establish a Pony Express to Sacramento, California, commencing 3rd of April. Time ten days."

== Organizing the Pony Express ==
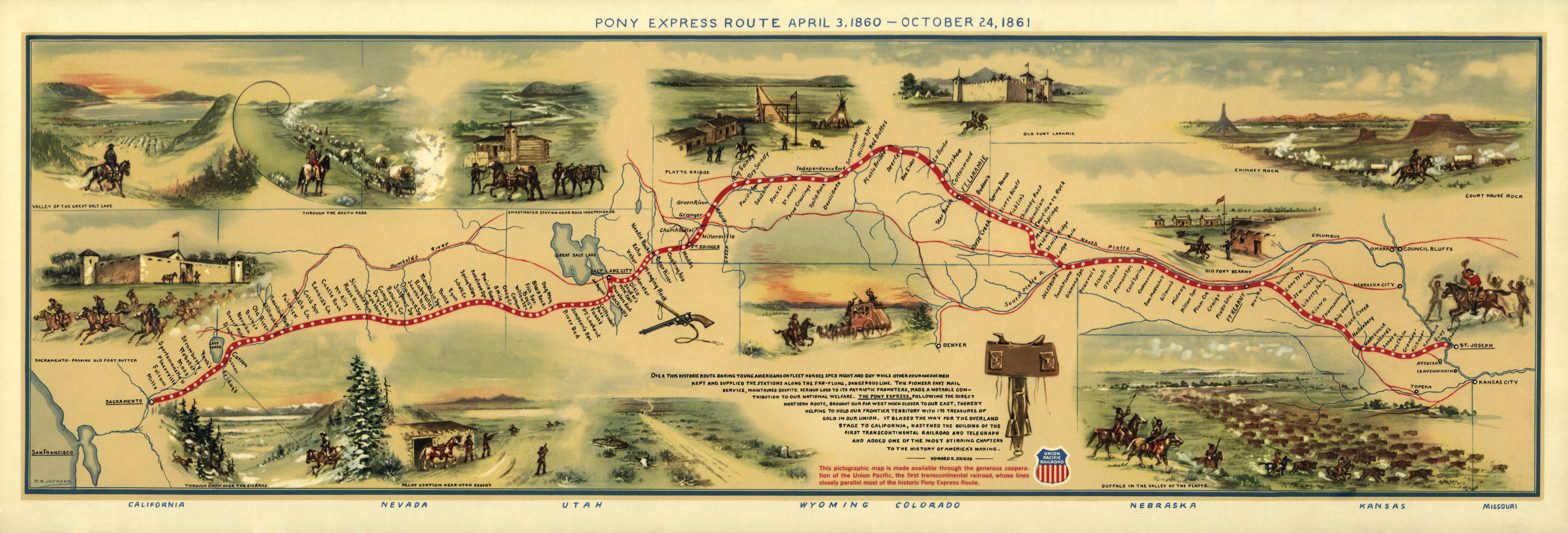
Map of the 1860 Pony Express Route by William Henry Jackson. The Pony Express helped define the Overland Trail.

The specifics of who conceived of the idea of a pony express and when are under dispute, but it was Russell, Majors, and Waddell who made the plan work. Russell wanted the Pony Express up and running in a little more than two months after announcing the formation of the Central Overland California & Pike's Peak Express. The firm used their considerable organizational expertise to construct stations, build roads, supply horses and equipment and hire stationmasters, mail agents, and riders in order to open the route from St. Joseph, Missouri, to Sacramento, California, on time. St Joseph was the logical choice for an eastern terminus as the Hannibal & St. Joseph Railroad line ended there enabling fast communication with the east.

The route was divided into five divisions, St. Joseph to Fort Kearny, Fort Kearny to Horseshoe station, Horseshoe Station to Salt Lake City, Salt Lake City to Roberts Creek, and Roberts Creek to Sacramento, each with its own superintendent. While the route followed the same roads as the Leavenworth City & Pike's Peak Express stage line many had to be repaired or upgraded to accommodate the new traffic. Many of the existing stations were re-purposed for the Pony Express but some additional stations were constructed in order to reduce the distance between stations to around 10 miles.

Whereas the trail between St. Joseph and Salt Lake City was well known to the firm, the trail from Salt Lake City to Sacramento was almost entirely unknown. At the time George Chorpenning held a federal mail contract between California and Utah which brought in $130,000 per year. His semimonthly service received mail in San Francisco which had been brought in by ship, and freighted it to Salt Lake City. Not willing to share his resources with a competitor, the C.O.C. & P.P. Express Co. was forced to build its own roads and stations to use. The company started building along the Humboldt River in northern Nevada, but when the United States Topographical Engineers surveyed a new route across central Nevada to Genoa they switched routes. The new trail shortened the distance between Utah and California by about 150 miles, and by December 1859 both Ceorge Chorpenning and the C.O.C. & P.P. Express Co. were building stations along the route.

The Central Overland California & Pike's Peak Express Company spared no expense in building and equipping these new stations considering the financial strain the company was in at the time. Between 400 and 500 horses were acquired and close to 200 stationmasters and 80 riders were hired to work the route. Home stations, where a rider would rest before returning the other direction, were placed every 75 to 100 miles apart. In April 1860, when the Pony Express made its first run, source state that between 119 and 153 stations were active.

The company's headquarters in San Francisco was at 601 Montgomery Street and is now California Historical Landmark No. 696. The company also set up central offices in major eastern cities, such as New York City and Washington D.C., where mail could be given to a company agent to be delivered to California. On March 17, 1860, an advertisement in the San Francisco Bulletin announced "PONY EXPRESS — NINE DAYS FROM SAN FRANCISCO TO NEW YORK." Announcements followed in New York and St. Louis. It is estimated that the total investment in the enterprise, including construction, equipment, and provisions, was over $70,000 at the time and that the monthly expenses would be about $5,000.

The first run of the Pony Express was scheduled for April 3, 1860. The mail pouch bound for the west, carrying "49 letters, 5 private telegrams, and some papers for San Francisco and intermediate points", had missed a train connection and the superintendent of the Hannibal & St. Joseph Railroad had to order a special locomotive dispatched to deliver the pouch to St. Joseph. The mail arrived two hours late and, after a number of speeches were recited, set off for Sacramento. It took seventy-five ponies to make the first trip from Missouri to California. Each major city along the way celebrated as the Pony Express rider passed through. On April 14, 1860, at about 1 a.m., the Pony Express from St. Joseph arrived in San Francisco. The east-bound rider left San Francisco April 3 and made it to St. Josephs on April 13. The Pony Express was active.

In the first month of existence, the Pony Express riders experienced violent weather, harsh terrain, and the physical hardship of being in a saddle for up to 100 miles a day. Despite this, operations ran smoothly. Although the number of letters being sent were not enough to offset the company's expenses, many communities along the line found the service valuable for the news the riders brought and there was talk of rival express operations in the planning stages. On May 11, 1860, Postmaster General Joseph Holt, cancelled the existing mail contract with George Chorpenning and offered it to the C.O.C. & P.P. Express Co instead. The contract paid about $260,000 per year, enough to cover the cost of running the Pony Express.

In early May 1860, the Pyramid Lake War started after an incident at the Williams Station along the Pony Express route. For more than three months skirmishes and raids occurred between the white settlers and local Paiute. Pony Express stations were generally easy targets for raids, often in remote locations with ample supplies and few residents. Due to lost personnel, stations, and horses the Pony Express was forced to suspend operations between Carson Valley and Salt Lake City through the end of June. The C.O.C. & P.P. Express Co. rebuilt the destroyed stations and posted up to five guards at each one along this portion of the route. The Pony Express recommenced service at the end of June, though hostilities between the Paiute and settlers didn't cease until August.

During the almost two-month disruption, the Pony Express continued to ride between Salt Lake City and St. Joseph. However this route brought in little money. The C.O.C. & P.P. Express Co. had spent upwards of $75,000 to reopen the route to California, much of the money went to fortifying the stations and hiring armed guards. With the company running low on funds a bill was brought before Congress to subsidize the Pony Express for weekly or semi-weekly trips, but it failed to pass. As raids on Pony Express stations continued, Russell, Majors, and Waddell decided that if Congress did not subsidize the route, they would end the enterprise in January 1861. The Post Office Department renewed their St. Joseph to Salt Lake City contract on October 28 and usage of the Pony Express continued to rise through the end of the year. With increasing revenue the firm decided to continue running the Pony Express, albeit at a reduced schedule over the winter.

== Decline of the Central Overland California and Pikes Peak Express Company ==
As the owners and operators of the Central Overland California and Pikes Peak Express Company, Russell, Majors, and Waddell were involved in all aspects of setting up and running both the stagecoach lines and the Pony Express. At the same time they continued to run their freighting firm which had been contracted to deliver supplies to the US Army forts scattered around the region. In late 1860 Russell, Majors, and Waddell still had not been paid for their 1857 contract, but with Secretary of War John B. Floyd's personal assurances that they would be paid, they had taken on over $5,000,000 in debt. This debt was on top of the separate debt incurred to set up and run the C.O.C. & P.P. Express Co.

In March 1860, Russell, Majors, and Waddell had outfitted a caravan to take supplies to the Army. Due to a number of unforeseen circumstances the caravan was unable to leave until late August. The cost of this delay was high; the men still needed to be paid, the wagon and supplies housed, and the mules and horses fed. Much of the firm's debt came due in mid-summer and they had expected to pay it off with the proceeds from the supply run, but the War Department would only pay upon receipt of goods. The company had to take out more loans to cover the previous debt and further damaged their credit. If the company could secure a government contract for mail, worth $600,000 to $900,000 a year, their financial issues would be solved.

With the physical (not financial) success of the Pony Express and the fact that the ocean service was set to expire in June 1860, a contract looked promising. However, Congress adjourned without passing a bill for a central overland mail route. William Russell, after an unsuccessful trip to New York to raise more funds, met with Godard Bailey, a relative of Secretary Floyd. Bailey, perhaps fearing that Floyd, as a guarantor of some of Russell, Majors, and Waddell's debt, would be forced to resign if the firm went bankrupt, agreed to help Russell raise money. Bailey let Russell borrow security bonds from the Indian Trust Fund, which Russell used as collateral for more loans. Bailey was not the owner of the bonds and Russell offered a note in their place that he knew was worth nothing; he had committed embezzlement. Russell went back three times to borrow from the Indian Trust Fund. Eventually Bailey's conscience forced him to confess to his part in the scheme and both men were arrested.

The outbreak of the Civil War saved the men from prosecution and they were freed on a technicality. However, the bond scandal had ruined the reputation of Russell, Majors, and Waddell, and their freighting firm soon collapsed into bankruptcy. Though Russell, Majors, and Waddell failed, the Central Overland California and Pikes Peak Express Company was a separate entity and it continued to operate.

When Texas seceded from the Union in 1861, they destroyed the Butterfield Overland Mail line and effectively cut off communication from California to the east over land. The postmaster general could not simply cancel the contract with the Overland Mail Company and so Congress transferred the route north to keep the mail moving through the Union. The C.O.C. & P.P. Express Co. supported this move for a number of reasons. The first reason was that the government would subsidize the Pony Express so it could continue to run until the telegraph reached California. The second reason was that the company couldn't afford to run the line alone in its present state, and neither could Overland Mail; therefore the two companies reached an agreement where the C.O.C. & P.P. Express Co. would subcontract to run the mail from St Joseph to Salt Lake City and Overland Mail would run from Salt Lake City to California using C.O.C. & P.P. Express Co's facilities. Considering the state of the company at the beginning of the year this was a favorable development.

With the Civil War begun, the Pony Express was the fastest way to transmit information from east to west and thus found itself in high demand. But the telegraph was catching up quickly, moving east from California and west from Nebraska. By mid August news telegraphed to San Francisco arrived two days before the Pony Express riders. Despite this, the volume of express mail continued to rise. However once the Pony Express stopped receiving government subsidies upon completion of the transcontinental telegraph, the business ran out of cash. Employees dubbed it "Clean Out of Cash and Poor Pay".

On April 26, 1861, Bela M. Hughes was chosen as president and general counsel of the company. The Central Overland California and Pikes Peak Express Company continued to deliver mail from St. Joseph to Salt Lake City for the Overland Mail Company until their contract expired in 1862. At that point Overland Mail put the contract up for bid and it was won by Ben Holladay. On March 21, 1862, Holladay purchased the holdings of the C. O. C. & P. P. Express at public sale for $100,000 and incorporated it into his firm the Overland Stage Company. With the company out of business its facilities in the West Bottoms of Kansas City, Missouri, eventually became the Kansas City Stockyards.

== See also ==
- Fort Morgan Cut-Off
- Pony Express Bible
- Postage stamps and postal history of the United States
