= SS Alexander Majors =

World War II Liberty ship of the United States

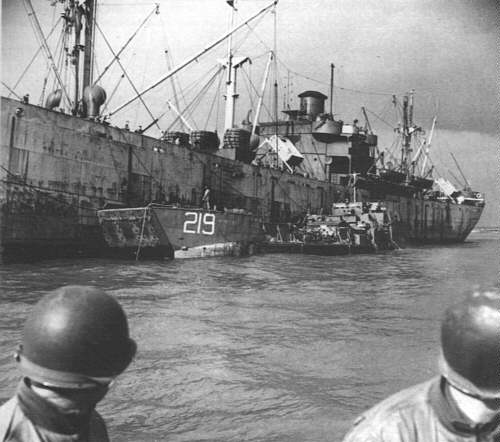
- SS Alexander Majors

History

United States
- Name: Alexander Majors
- Namesake: Alexander Majors
- Owner: United States Maritime Commission
- Operator: Isthmian Steamship Company, then US Army
- Builder: Permanente Metals Corp.
- Yard number: No. 1; Richmond, California
- Way number: 1
- Laid down: 227 December 1943
- Launched: 20 January 1944
- Completed: 4 March 1944
- Fate: Scrapped at Vado in 1973

General characteristics
- Class & type: Liberty ship; type EC2-S-C1, standard
- Tonnage: 7,176 GRT, 10,865 DWT
- Displacement: 14,245 long tons (14,474 t)
- Length: 441 feet 6 inches (135 m) oa; 416 feet (127 m) pp; 427 feet (130 m) lwl
- Beam: 57 feet (17 m)
- Draft: 27 ft 9.25 in (8.4646 m)
- Propulsion: 1 × triple-expansion steam engine, (manufactured by Joshua Hendy Iron Works, Sunnyvale, California); 1 × screw propeller
- Speed: 11.5 knots (21.3 km/h; 13.2 mph)
- Capacity: 562,608 cubic feet (15,931 m^{3}) (grain); 499,573 cubic feet (14,146 m^{3}) (bale)
- Troops: 550
- Complement: 38–62 USMM; 21–40 USNAG
- Armament: Varied by ship; Bow-mounted 3-inch (76 mm)/50-caliber gun; Stern-mounted 4-inch (102 mm)/50-caliber gun; 2–8 × single 20-millimeter (0.79 in) Oerlikon anti-aircraft (AA) cannons and/or, 2–8 × 37-millimeter (1.46 in) M1 AA guns

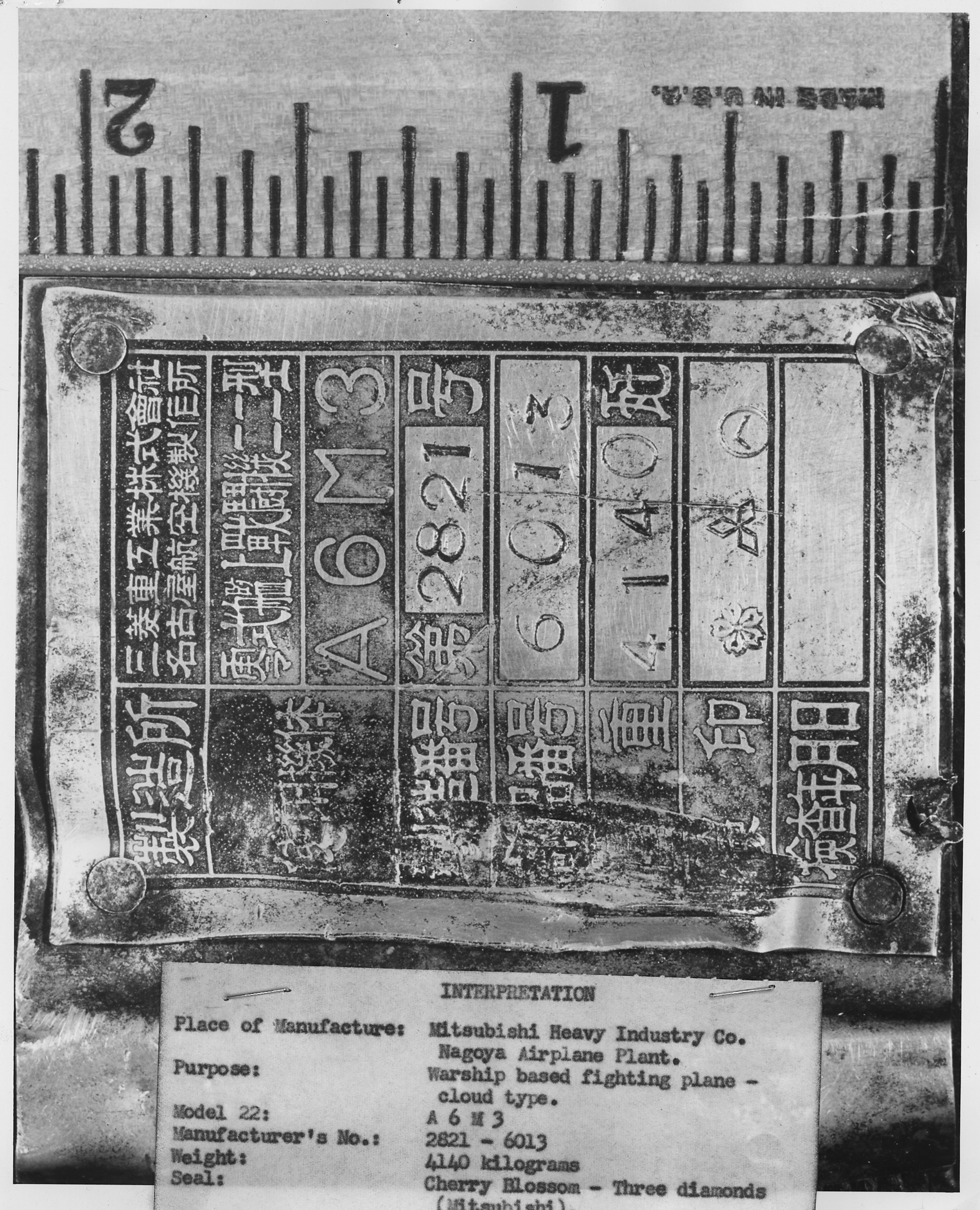
Nameplate Serieal 0145 from Japanese attack plane that hit the SS Alexander Majors

SS Alexander Majors was a Liberty ship built for the United States Maritime Commission during World War II. The ship was named in honor of Alexander Majors an American who with William Hepburn Russell and William B. Waddell founded the Pony Express. The ship was assigned by the War Shipping Administration to Isthmian Steamship Company of New York who operated it throughout World War 2. Alexander Majors was Laid down on 27 December 1943, launched on 20 January 1944 and completed on 4 March 1944, with the hull No. 2262 as part of the Emergency Shipbuilding Program.

== Attacked ==
Alexander Majors was part of the supply ships that supported the Battle of Leyte from 7 October to 26 December 1944 in the Pacific war campaign of World War II. On November 12, 1944 Alexander Majors was at anchor one mile (1.6 km) west of Dulag, Leyte in Leyte Gulf, when an Empire of Japan plane dropped an aerial bomb about 50 yards (46 m) from the ship. Her United States Navy Armed Guard shot the plane down. In the afternoon another kamikaze plane attacked Alexander Majors. The plane hit a second plane that crashed into Alexander Majors' mainmast. The plane exploded, killing two crew and blowing the cargo cover off cargo holds #3 and #4. Fire starting in the two cargo holds. The Armed Guards help shoot down the third plane. The explosion blew some of the crew overboard. The explosion knocked out the ship fire fighting gear. But a Navy LCI fire fighting ship was able to come alongside and put out the fire in the two cargo holds. The cargo in hold #3 and #4 was a complete loss, kapok life jackets in #3 took days to put out. Alexander Majors, still operational, continued to defend off more planes. She destroyed a plane on November 24. There were 160 more attacks from November 4 to December 4, but she survived each. Her burnt two cargo holes, deck, bridge and two lifeboats were repaired or replaced. The kamikaze attack was at 11°11'N, 125°05'E. In addition to the two crewmen killed, one seaman was hit by shrapnel metal, one Armed Guard was hospitalized at Leyte, 11 Armed Guards and two United States Army were burnt by the fire. At the end of the war, she was turned over to the Army Transportation Service and was operated as a troop ship to bring home vets as part of Operation Magic Carpet. The Army Transportation Service renamed her the SS Alexander Majors USAT.

== Post war ==
After the war, in 1947, she was sold to the Italian Line in Genoa, Italy and operated as an Italian flagship. She was renamed SS Tritone In 1972 she was laid up at Trieste. In 1973 she was scrapped at Sant'Angelo in Vado.

== See also ==
- Allied technological cooperation during World War II
- List of Liberty ships
- Type C1 ship
- Type C2 ship
- Victory ship
- U.S. Merchant Marine Academy
