= William Hepburn Russell =

Co-founder of the Pony Express (1812–1872)

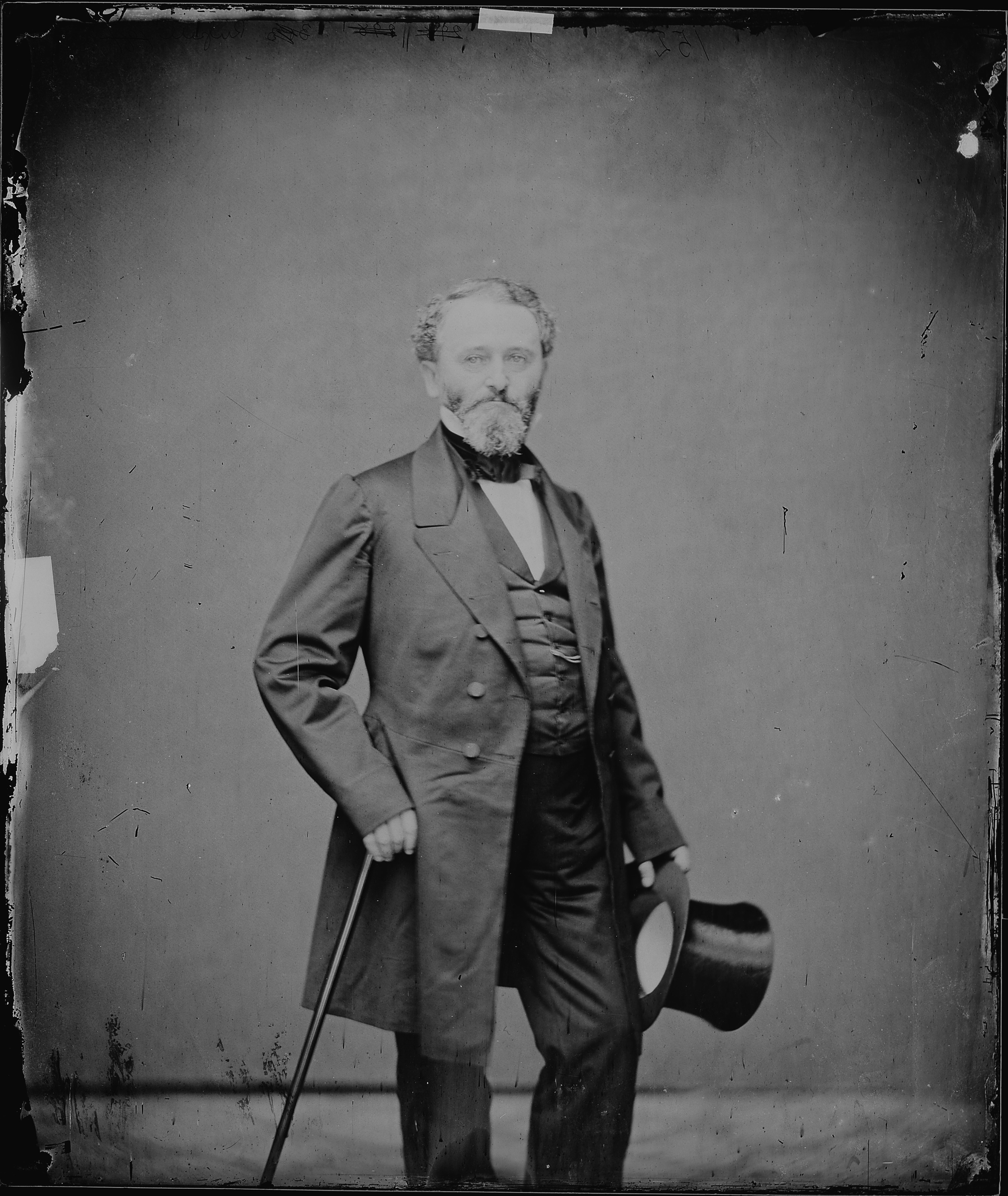
- Born: January 31, 1812; Burlington, Vermont
- Died: September 10, 1872 (aged 60); Palmyra, Missouri

William Hepburn Russell (1812–1872) was an American businessman. He was a partner, along with Alexander Majors and William B. Waddell, in the freighting firm Russell, Majors, and Waddell and the stagecoach company the Central Overland California and Pikes Peak Express Company which was the parent company of the Pony Express. His public life is one of numerous business ventures, some successful and some failed. While Russell, described as a good-looking man, lived the majority of his life on the edge on the western frontier, he was always more at home in the upper-class settings of the East coast.

== Early life ==
Russell was born in Burlington, Vermont, on January 31, 1812. In the early 1820s, he moved as a child with his family to western Missouri. In 1826, at the age of 16 and with little formal education, he began work at the Ely & Curtis general store in Liberty, Missouri. Two years later, in 1830, he began working for the mercantile firm of James Aull and Samuel Ringo, where he learned the wholesale business.

== Marriage and family ==
In 1835 he married Harriet Elliot Warder, whose social standing helped his.

== Early business ventures ==
In 1837 at the age of 25, Russell left the Aull and Ringo firm to strike out on his own. He helped to organize the Lexington First Addition Company in 1840 with his future partner, William B. Waddell. In 1844, using borrowed money, Russell and James H. Bullard created the partnership of Bullard & Russell to open a general store. This partnership soon welcomed an additional partner in E.C. McCarty and expanded to shipping goods to Santa Fe, New Mexico. He then went on to become a partner in the established firm of Waddell, Ramsey & Co. While some of these early business ventures ended in failure, by 1848, Russell was successful enough to build a 20-room mansion in Lexington, Missouri.

In 1850, in partnership with James Brown, and John S. Jones, Russell entered the military freighting business. This partnership dissolved soon after the death of Brown in 1850. In 1852, he re-partnered with William B. Waddell to form a mercantile firm; by 1854 they were freighting military supplies to Santa Fe.

== Pony Express ==
On December 28, 1854 Alexander Majors joined Russell and Waddell to form the corporation of Russell, Majors, and Waddell. This firm obtained a consolidated contract with the War Department to supply the majority of military forts west of the Missouri River. Acting as the firm's representative in Washington, D.C., Philadelphia, and New York City, Russell lobbied for contracts with the War Department as well as for financing from banks and other sources. With a virtual monopoly on all western freighting contracting Russell, Majors, and Waddell became the largest freighting company in western Missouri.

In July 1858, the Pike's Peak Gold Rush started when Green Russell and Sam Bates found a small amount of gold in Colorado. William Russell was in Leavenworth, Kansas, when he heard the news. Believing that this gold rush was the start of heavy emigration to the region, Russell, together with his former partner John S. Jones, gathered new investors, borrowed money, and organized a stage and express line to run to Denver. The new service was called the Leavenworth City & Pike's Peak Express Company and transported "passengers, mail, freight, and gold" to and from the Pike's Peak area on a trail between the Republican and Smoky Hill forks of the Kansas River. To help finance their venture, Russell and Jones wanted to secure a contract to deliver mail for the United States government and on May 11, 1859 they purchased Hockaday & Company the firm that owned the postal contract between St. Joseph, Missouri, and Salt Lake City. The postal contract ran until November 1860 and had been profitable until the post office reduced the frequency of trips and payments for delivery.

After consolidating the two companies, Russell and Jones redirected their Denver coaches to Hockaday's more northern route, having run on their original route for less than six weeks. The firm constructed new stations along the route, sixteen to forty miles apart. The construction of the new stations and the abandonment of the stations on the original route were a financial burden on the company. By the fall of 1859 the Leavenworth City & Pike's Peak Express Company's creditors were owed more than $525,000 and the debts were threatening to collapse the firm. Russell had not partner with Alexander Majors or William Waddell in the Leavenworth City & Pike's Peak Express Company; they thought it was too early to know whether the emigration would be sustained or merely a passing fad. That did not stop him from using the reputation of Russell, Majors, and Waddell to secure credit for the Leavenworth City & Pike's Peak Express Company. This put a strain on the relationship of the three men.

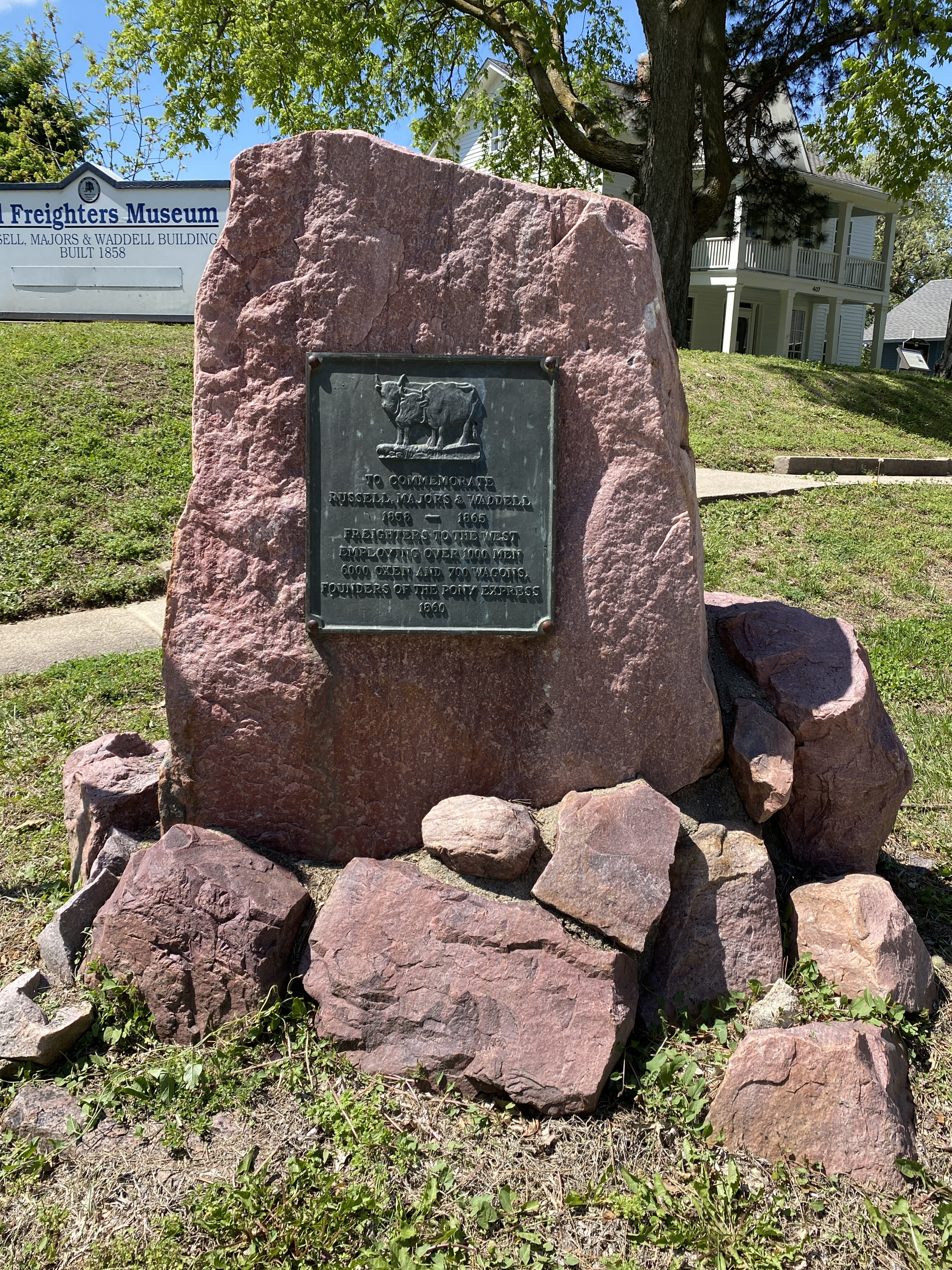
Monument to Russell, Majors, and Waddell, Nebraska City, 2026

Nevertheless, Majors and Waddell knew that if the Leavenworth City & Pike's Peak Express Company failed, it could bring down Russell, Majors, and Waddell as well. On October 28, 1859 the three men entered into a new partnership which assumed the assets and debts of the Leavenworth City & Pike's Peak Express Company. Less than a month later, and likely without consulting his partners, Russell named the new firm the Central Overland California & Pike's Peak Express Company or C.O.C. & P.P Express Co. The new name reflected his hope of securing a daily mail route to California along a central route through the Rocky Mountains. (The Southern Route traveled from St. Louis, Missouri, through El Paso, Texas, to San Francisco, California.) Russell headed back to New York in December to raise funds and hold off creditors. On January 27, 1860, he wrote his son: "Have determined to establish a Pony Express to Sacramento, California, commencing 3rd of April. Time ten days."

Under charter from the Kansas legislature, the Central Overland California and Pikes Peak Express Company started the Pony Express which began operations on April 3, 1860. By utilizing a short route and using mounted riders rather than traditional stagecoaches, they established a fast mail service between St. Joseph, Missouri, and Sacramento, California, with letters delivered in 10 days, a duration many at the time said was impossible. Russell, Majors, and Waddell had hoped to win an exclusive government mail contract to continue running the Pony Express, but that did not come about and the business venture proved to be a failure, losing upwards of $1,000 a day. By October 1861, the Pony Express was out of business due to the completion of the telegraph lines and the unwillingness of the national government to provide further funding.

In attempting to secure funding to continue running the Pony Express, Russell became mixed up in a scandal involving Secretary of War John Buchanan Floyd and Godard Bailey, a clerk for the Department of Interior. In 1857 Secretary Floyd had personally guaranteed payment for a government contract that Congress had not paid. Russell, Majors, and Waddell used this guarantee to secure a line of credit but the failure of the Pony Express now threatened to bankrupt the firm. Bailey, perhaps fearing that Floyd, as a guarantor of some of Russell, Majors, and Waddell's debt, would be forced to resign if the firm went bankrupt, agreed to help Russell raise money. Through a series of illegal transactions, money was obtained from the Indian Trust Fund. On December 1, 1860, Bailey confessed to Floyd and was arrested and brought to trial along with Russell. The outbreak of the American Civil War saved the men from prosecution and they were freed on a technicality. But the bond scandal had ruined the reputation of Russell, Majors, and Waddell and their freighting firm soon collapsed into bankruptcy.

== Later years ==
Deep in debt and without his previous social connections, Russell attempted to regain his fortunes in a Colorado gold mining venture that resulted in failure. His assets were sold in April 1865 to pay off creditors. He went to a brokerage partnership with Thomas P. Akers in New York, a venture that also failed. Due to failing health he returned to Missouri to live first with his daughter in St. Louis and then with his son in Palmyra, Missouri, where he died September 10, 1872, at age 60.

== See also ==
- Postage stamps and postal history of the United States
