= Boreas Mountain (Colorado) =

Mountain in Colorado, United States

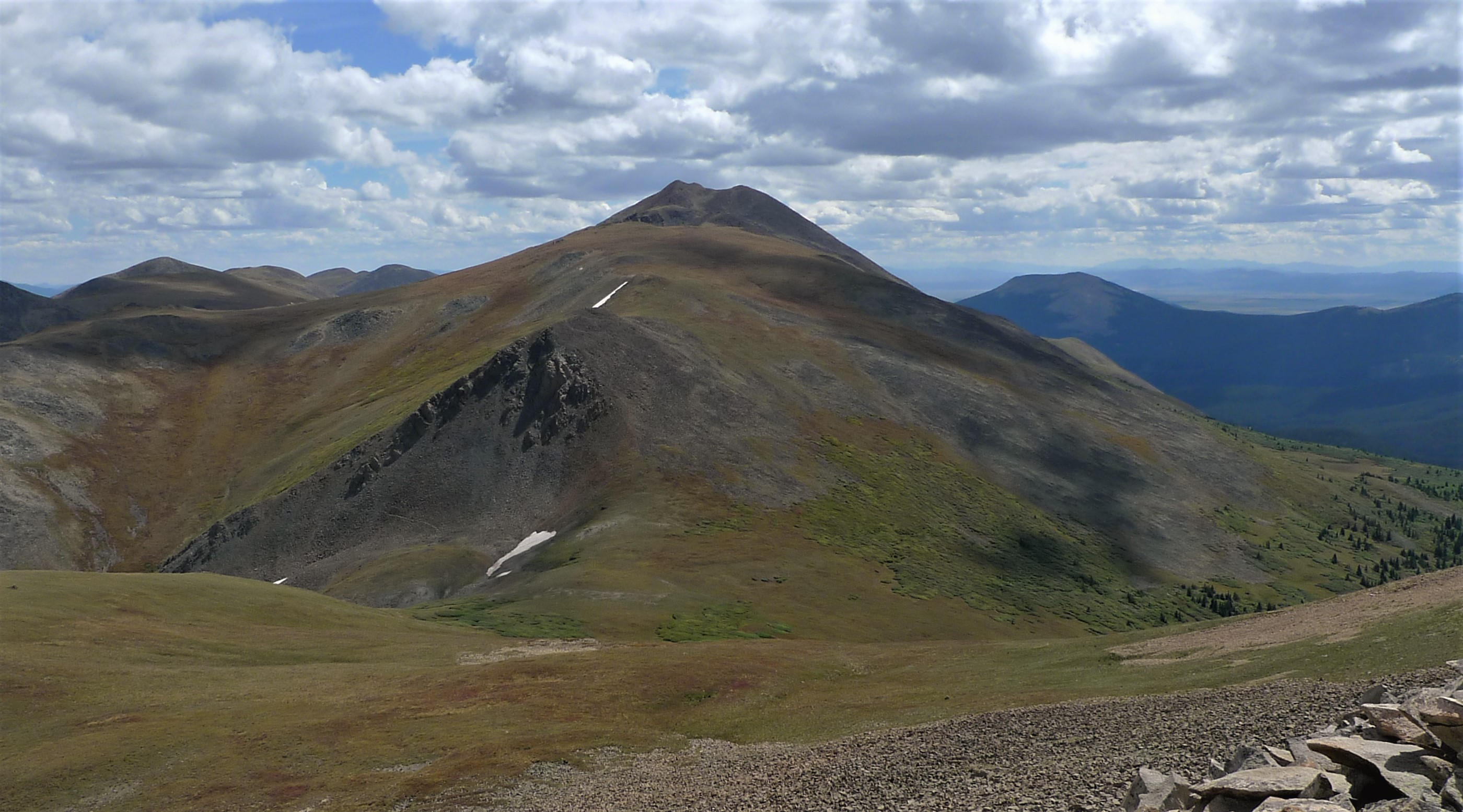
- North aspect

Highest point
- Elevation: 13,082 ft (3,987 m)
- Prominence: 916 ft (279 m)
- Parent peak: Bald Mountain (13,690 ft)
- Isolation: 2.88 mi (4.63 km)
- Coordinates: 39°24′22″N 105°56′55″W

Naming
- Etymology: Boreas, Boreas Pass

Geography
- Location within Colorado Location within the United States
- Country: United States
- State: Colorado
- County: Park
- Protected area: Pike National Forest
- Parent range: Rocky Mountains; Front Range
- Topo map: USGS Boreas Pass

Climbing
- Easiest route: Hiking class 2

Boreas Mountain is a 13,082-foot (3,987 m) mountain summit in Park County, Colorado, United States.

== Description ==
Boreas Mountain is set one-half mile east of the Continental Divide in the Front Range, which is a subrange of the Rocky Mountains. The mountain is located seven miles (11 km) southeast of the community of Breckenridge and one mile (1.6 km) east-southeast of Boreas Pass, on land managed by Pike National Forest. Precipitation runoff from the mountain's slopes drains into tributaries of Tarryall Creek which flows to the South Platte River. Topographic relief is modest as the summit rises over 2,000 feet (610 m) in one mile (1.6 km). The mountain's toponym has been officially adopted by the United States Board on Geographic Names. The mountain is named in association with Boreas Pass, which takes its name from Boreas, the Greek god of the cold north wind. Sidney Dillon applied the Boreas name to the pass.

== Climate ==
According to the Köppen climate classification system, Boreas Mountain is located in an alpine subarctic climate zone with cold, snowy winters, and cool to warm summers. Due to its altitude, it receives precipitation all year, as snow in winter and as thunderstorms in summer, with a dry period in late spring.

== See also ==
- Thirteener

== Gallery ==
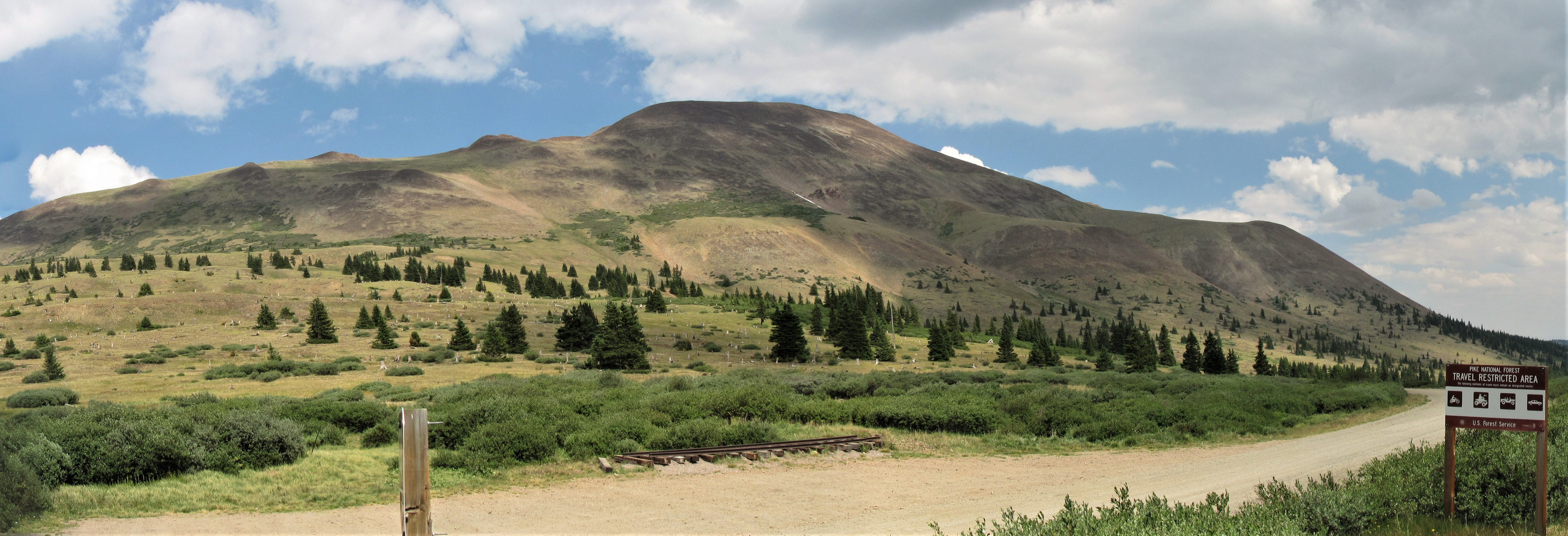
West aspect of Boreas Mountain from Boreas Pass

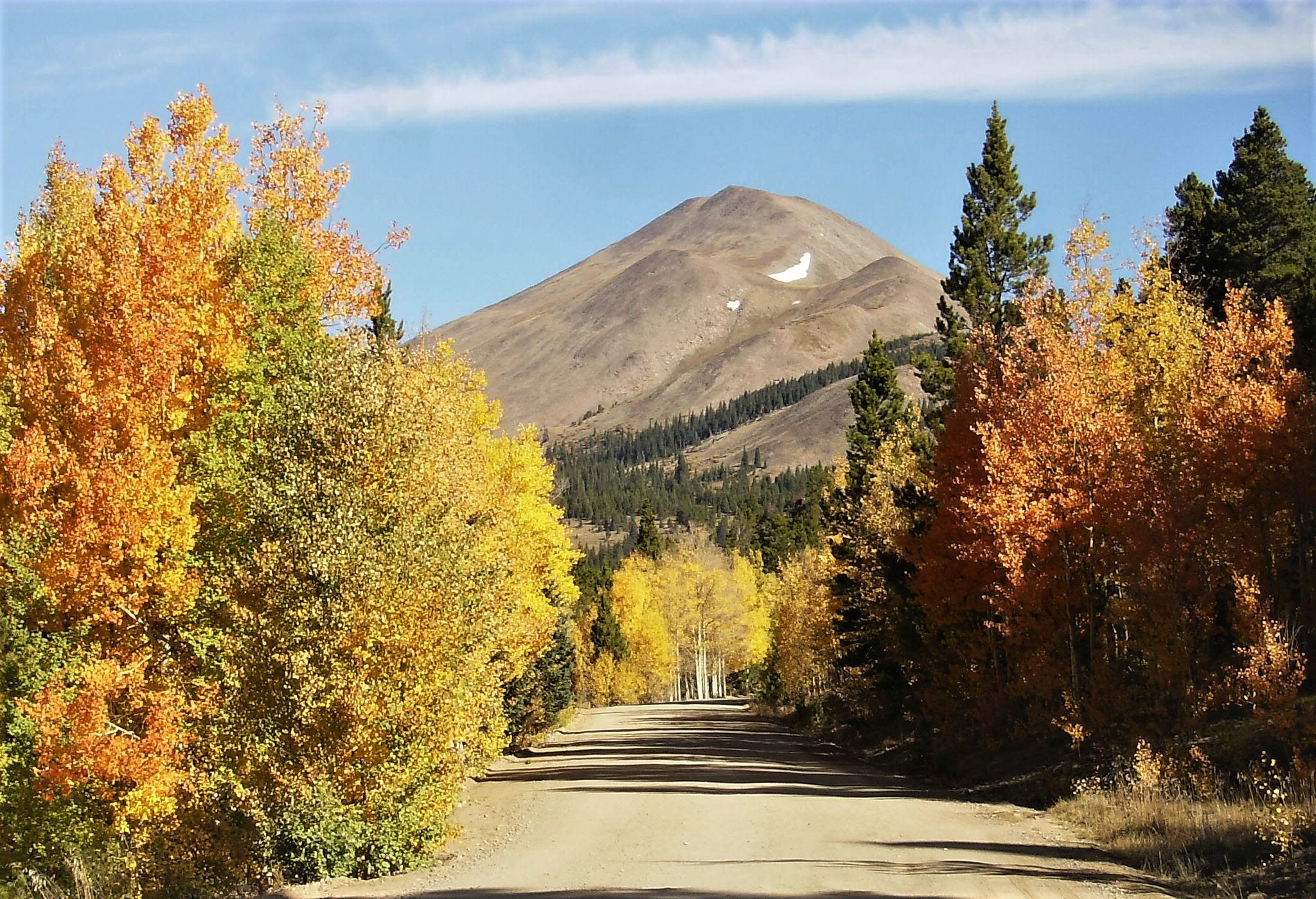
South aspect of Boreas Mountain viewed from Boreas Pass Road

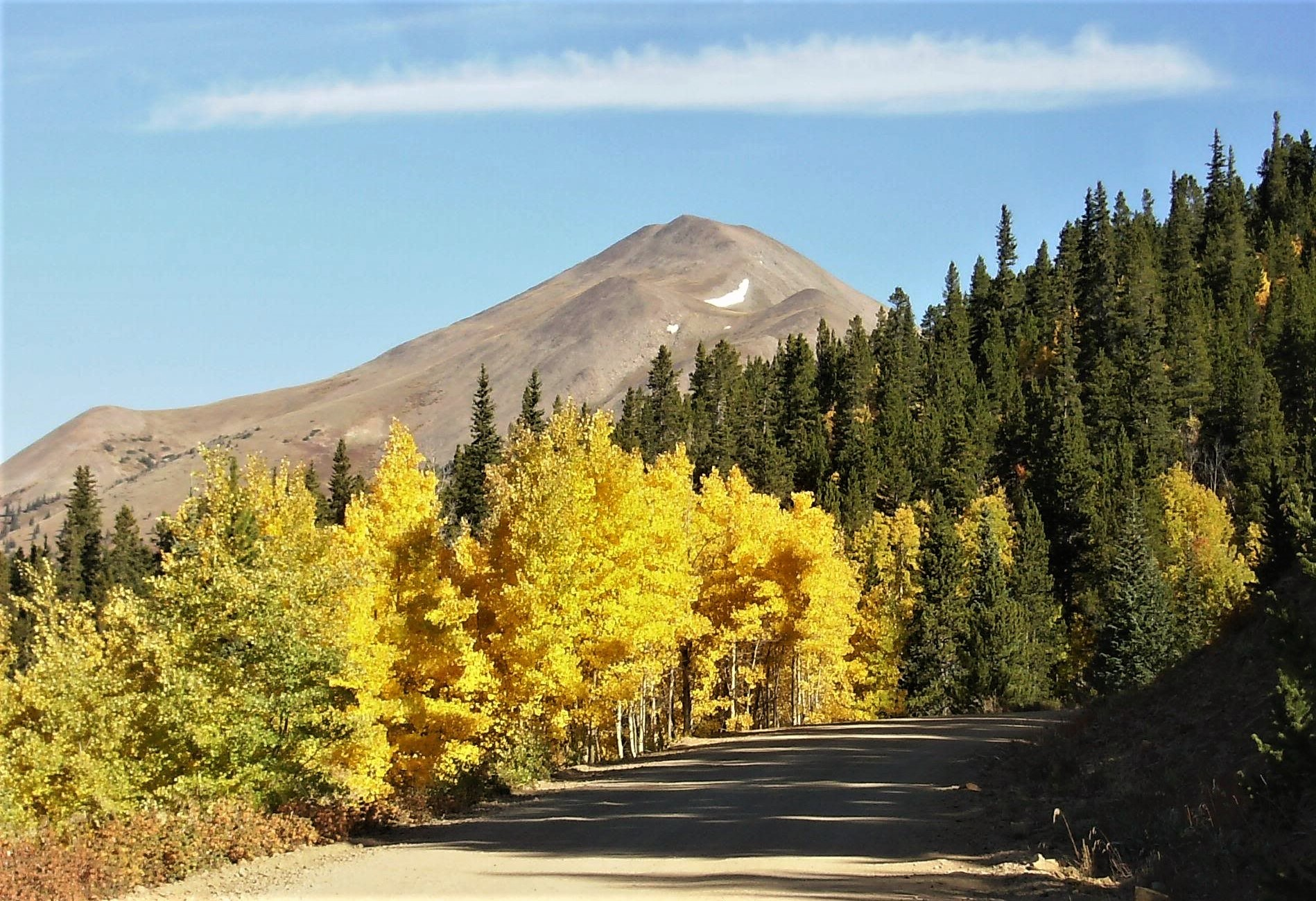
South aspect of Boreas Mountain viewed from Boreas Pass Road

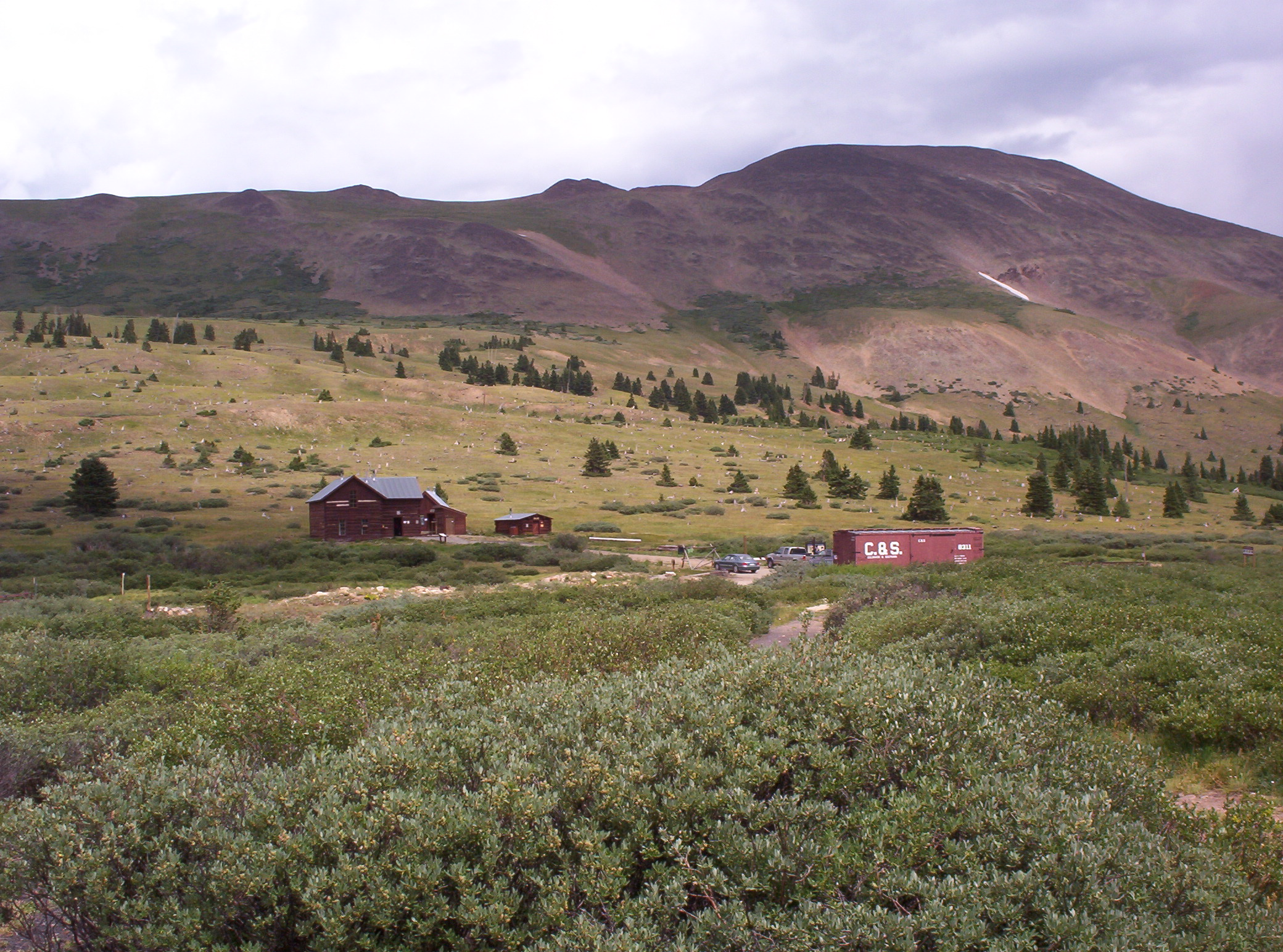
West aspect of Boreas Mountain from Boreas Pass
