= Russell Gulch, Colorado =

Ghost town in Gilpin County, Colorado, United States

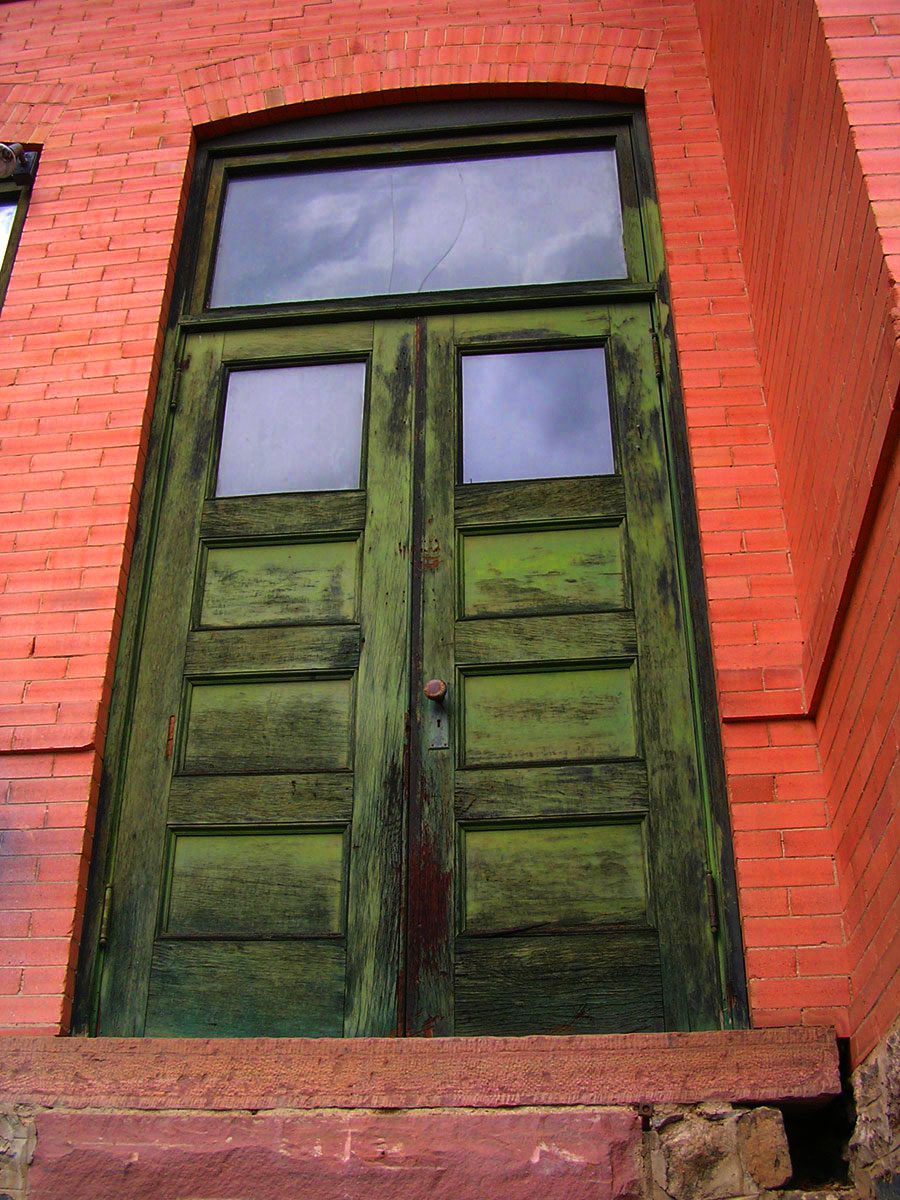
Old School, Russell Gulch

Russell Gulch, is a former mining town, now largely a ghost town, in Gilpin County, Colorado, United States. Although the population was once much larger than today, and most of the larger commercial buildings stand empty, the town is not completely deserted.

== History ==
Historical population
| Census | Pop. | Note | %± |
|---|---|---|---|
| 1860 | 479 | | — |
| 1880 | 543 | | — |
| 1890 | 673 | | 23.9% |
| 1900 | 728 | | 8.2% |
| 1910 | 654 | | −10.2% |
| 1930 | 75 | | — |

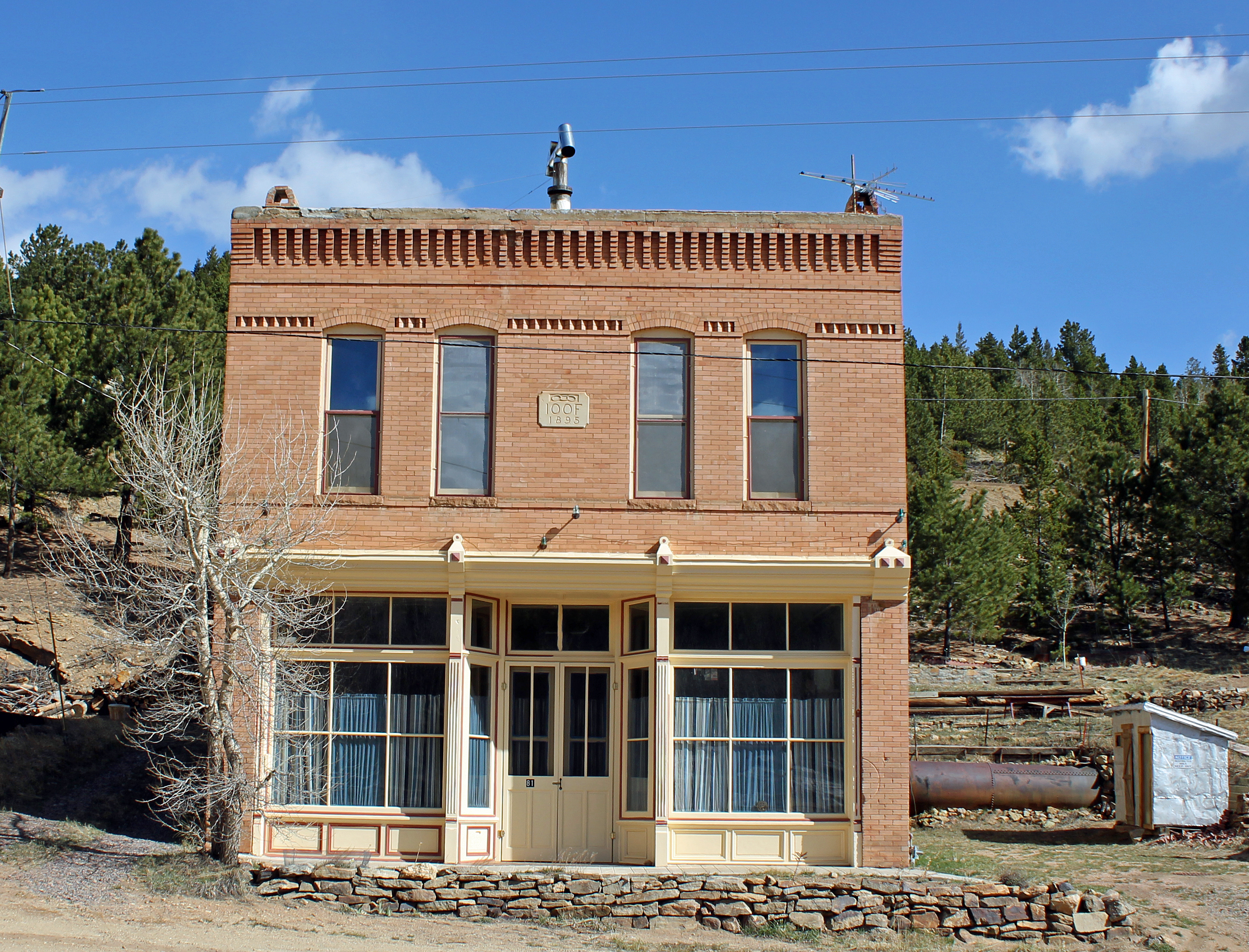
Russell Gulch IOOF Hall, 1895

William Greeneberry Russell, a miner from the gold fields of northern Georgia, had come to the vicinity of present-day Denver, then part of western Kansas Territory, in 1858 and with his brothers, founded Auraria on the banks of the Cherry Creek river. His discoveries led to what became the Pikes Peak Gold Rush. Another settlement on the opposite bank was founded by William Larimer in early 1859. This settlement soon merged with Auraria and was named Denver after the territorial governor. Russell discovered placer gold deposits in June 1859 in the valley that was soon named Russell Gulch in his honor. By the end of September, 891 men were mining gold in the gulch, and the eponymous town was built near the head of the gulch to serve the miners.

The placer deposits were quickly worked out, and work shifted to the vein deposits that were the source of the placer gold.

== Geography ==
Russell Gulch is located approximately two miles southwest of Central City, Colorado, at an altitude of 9,150 feet (2,790 m) above mean sea level.

== Attractions ==
Russell Gulch is home to a disc golf course, at an altitude of around 9200 feet.

== See also ==
- List of ghost towns in Colorado
