= Boreas Pass =

Mountain pass in Colorado, USA

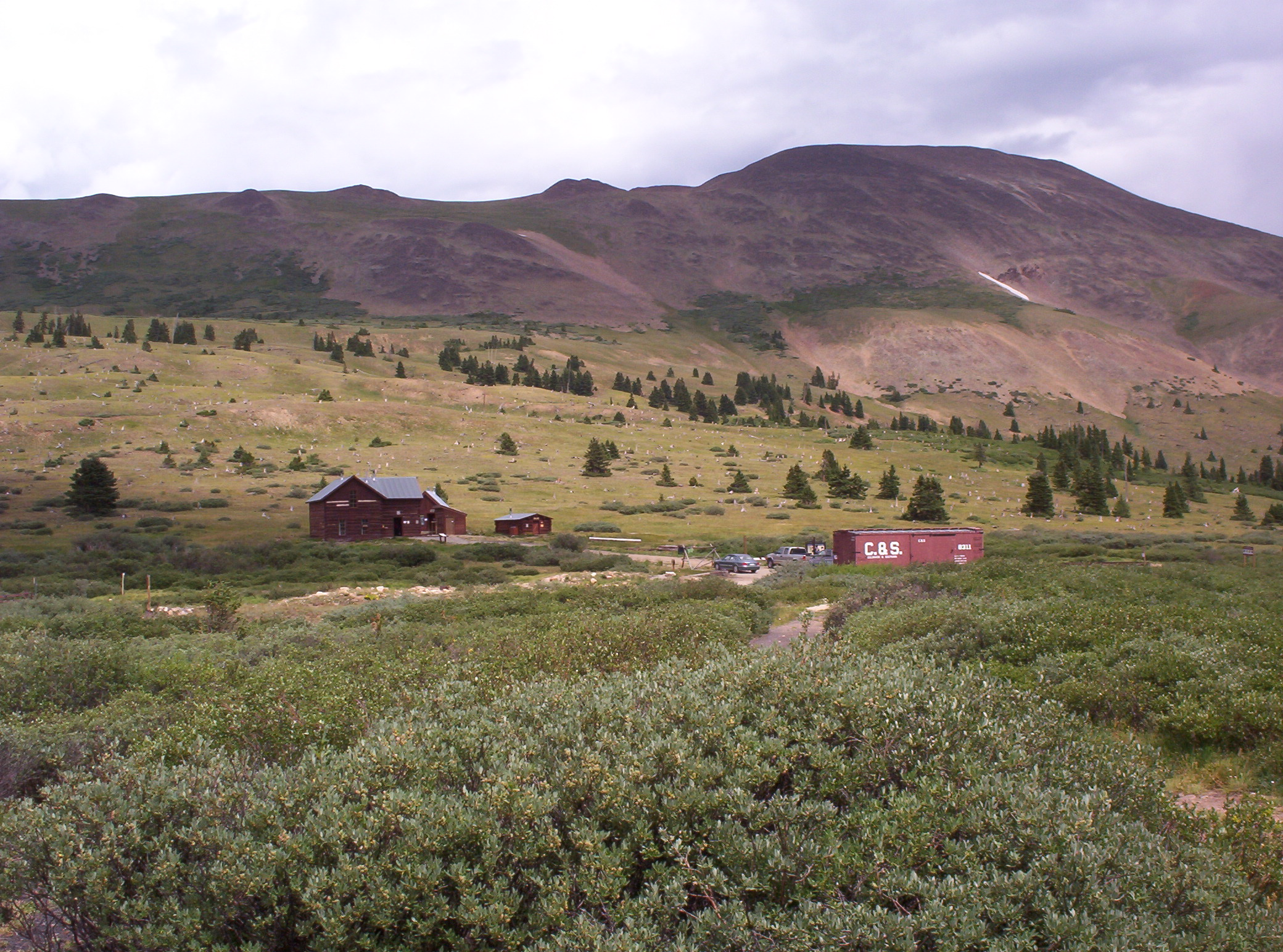
- Boreas Pass in summer with Boreas Mountain

- Location within Colorado
- Elevation: 11,481 feet (3,499 m) NAVD 88
- Traversed by: Boreas Pass Road (unpaved)

Third Approach
- Location: Park / Summit counties, Colorado, U.S.
- Range: Front Range
- Coordinates: 39°24′37″N 105°58′05″W
- Topo map: USGS Boreas Pass

Boreas Pass (elevation 11,481 ft (3,499 m)) is a high mountain pass in central Colorado, in the Rocky Mountains of the western United States. The pass is located on the continental divide, at the crest of the Front Range along the border between Park (south) and Summit counties.

== Description ==
The pass crosses the range where it divides the headwaters of the Blue River (a tributary of the Colorado River) to the north with South Park and the headwaters of the South Platte River to the south. It is traversed by Forest Service Road 33, a gravel road that is closed in winter but passable by two-wheel drive automobiles in good weather. In winter, the road is used by cross-country skiers. The road over the pass goes north from the town of Como in the northern South Park northeast of Fairplay, crossing the path northward to Breckenridge. In good weather, it furnishes an alternative route to nearby Hoosier Pass, offering splendid views of aspen trees and nearby Mount Silverheels and the Tenmile Range. The round trip up to the top from Breckenridge is popular with bicyclists.

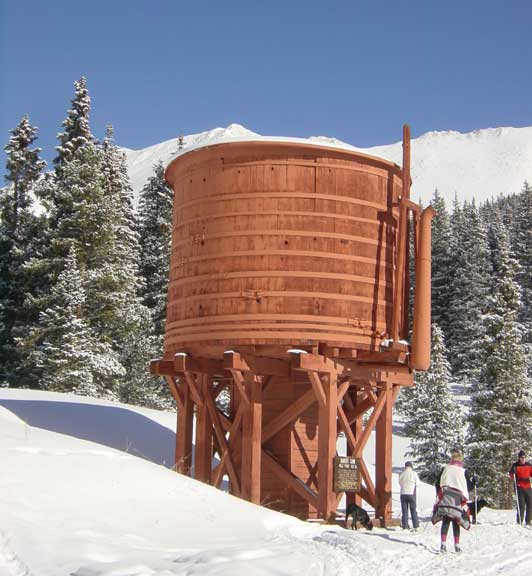
Cross-country skiers traveling the old Boreas Pass railroad grade pass the restored Bakers water tank

The pass was formerly known as Breckenridge Pass in the 1860s, when it served as an early route for thousands of prospectors during the Colorado Gold Rush who crossed from South Park to look for gold in the valley of the Blue around Breckenridge. In 1866, it was widened to a wagon road that accommodated stagecoaches. In 1882, under the direction of Sidney Dillon of the Union Pacific Railroad, the Denver, South Park and Pacific Railroad (by then controlled by the Union Pacific) begun laying narrow gauge tracks up the pass, which Dillon renamed in honor of Boreas, the Ancient Greek god of the North Wind. The line was a spur to Breckenridge (eventually extended to Leadville) off the company's main line from Denver through South Park. A roundhouse, still in existence, was constructed at Como at the junction of the lines. The rail line over the pass was a major engineering feat, primarily because of the winter snows at high altitude. When completed, it had dozens of snow sheds along its route, which approached a 4% grade in many places. A town of Boreas, now a ghost town, was constructed at the summit, primarily to house workers to clear the line in winter. The line was abandoned in 1937 by the Colorado & Southern, along with most of the company's narrow gauge right-of-way. After World War II, the Army Corps of Engineers reconstructed the route for automobile traffic. On the north side of the pass, Forest Service Road 593 leads to the 1880s ghost town site of Dyersville, as well as many abandoned mining sites.

The Boreas Pass Ditch was completed in 1910 to divert water over the pass from the headwaters of Indiana Creek, a tributary of the Blue River into North Tarryall Creek, a tributary of the South Platte River. The 0.8 mile (1.3 km) ditch has a capacity of 16 cubic feet per second (0.45m^{3}/s), and in an average year, it transports about 140 acre-feet (170,000m^{3}) of water. The ditch was originally built to irrigate land in South Park, but it currently serves the city of Englewood, which rehabilitated the ditch In 1990.

The Boreas Railroad Station Site is listed on the National Register of Historic Places.
