= Tarryall Creek =

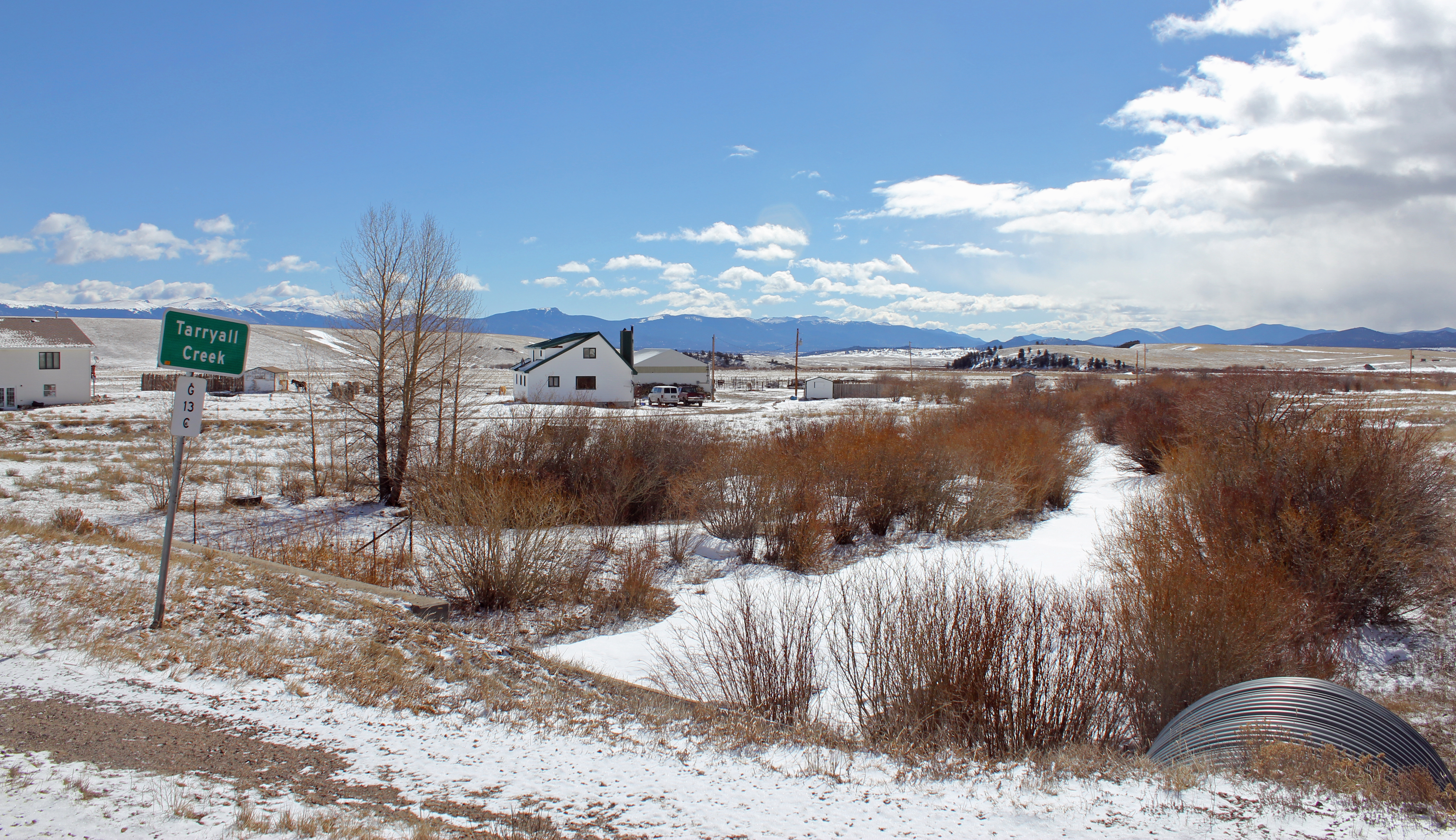
- The creek as seen from the southeast side of U.S. Route 285 in Park County in late March, 2014.

Physical characteristics
- Source
  - location: Park County, Colorado
  - coordinates: 39°20′33″N 106°00′33″W
- Mouth
  - location: Confluence with the South Platte River
  - coordinates: 39°05′49″N 105°20′23″W
  - elevation: 7,224 ft (2,202 m)

Basin features
- Progression: South Platte—Platte; Missouri—Mississippi

Tarryall Creek is a tributary of the South Platte River, approximately 68.5 miles (110.2 km) long, in Park County in central Colorado in the United States. It drains a rural portion of north and central South Park, an intermontane grassland in the Rocky Mountains southwest of Denver. It rises in the high Rockies in several forks along the Continental Divide in the Pike National Forest southwest of Boreas Pass. It descends to the southwest through a short canyon, emerging into South Park near Como, Colorado. It crosses U.S. Highway 285 east of Red Hill Pass northeast of Fairplay, the county seat of Park County, then meanders towards the southeast, joining the South Platte from the east in the southeastern corner of South Park.

== History ==
The creek was one of the most active locations for the prospecting of gold during the Colorado Gold Rush in 1859. The "Tarryall diggings" and other nearby sites on the west side of South Park attracted thousands of prospectors over Ute Pass and Kenosha Pass, and the towns of Tarryall and Hamilton, both now completely vanished, were soon founded along the creek. There are no towns on the upper creek today.

== Public lands ==
The creek flows through a variety of public lands between its headwaters and its confluence with the South Platte River. The creek's headwaters lie near the Continental Divide in the Pike National Forest in Park County, Colorado. North of Highway 285, the creek flows through the Cline Ranch State Wildlife Area. Also, the creek flows through a small portion of the Tarryall Creek State Trust Land. The creek flows through the northeast corner of this one square mile plot of land, which offers hunting and fishing.

In 2023, the Western Rivers Conservancy (WRC) purchased the 1,860-acre (750-hectare) Collard Ranch. Tarryall Creek meanders for five miles (8.0 kilometers) through the ranch, which lies on the south side of Highway 285. The wildlife in the ranch includes elk, brown trout and rainbow trout. In March 2024, WRC transferred the tract of land to Colorado Parks and Wildlife, which plans to develop it as the Collard Ranch State Wildlife Area and have it fully open by spring 2025.

The creek flows through another state-managed protected area — the Tarryall Reservoir State Wildlife Area. This wildlife area is located 16.5 miles (26.6 kilometers) southeast of Jefferson, Colorado on Park County Road 77. Flowing through the Tarryall Reservoir, the creek again passes through the Pike National Forest prior to its confluence with the South Platte.

== Dams ==
The creek is impounded at two places by two dams. The first, Tarryall Dam, creates Tarryall Reservoir, the centerpiece of the Tarryall Reservoir State Wildlife Area. Built in 1929, the dam is owned by Colorado Parks and Wildlife. It has NID ID #CO00342 and can hold 1,580 acre-feet (1,950,000 cubic meters) of water.

The other dam on the creek is a privately owned earthen dam called Bayou Salado, which creates a reservoir of the same name. Built in 1968, the dam is owned by the Tarryall River Club and is used for recreation. It has NID ID #CO00352 and can hold 282 acre-feet (348,000 cubic meters) of water.

== See also ==
- List of rivers of Colorado
