= Alexander Majors =

American businessman (1814–1900)

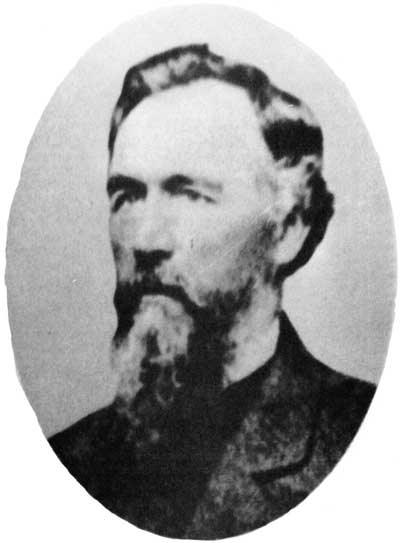
- Born: October 4, 1814; Franklin, Kentucky, US
- Died: January 13, 1900 (aged 85); Chicago, Illinois, US
- Occupation: Businessman
- Known for: Pony Express

Alexander Majors (October 4, 1814 – January 13, 1900) was an American businessman, who along with William Hepburn Russell and William B. Waddell founded the Pony Express, based in St. Joseph, Missouri. This was one of the westernmost points east of the Missouri River from its upper portion beyond that state. It was a major supply point for migrants and pioneers headed west to Oregon Country.

Even though they succeeded in making the deliveries, they did not get the contract. They went bankrupt after the Transcontinental Telegraph opened in October 1861, as its competition eliminated the need for some mail service.

Majors supplied rail ties for the crews of the Union Pacific Railroad working on the First transcontinental railroad. After the railroad was completed, he continued to haul freight to towns not yet served by the railroad.

== Early life ==
Alexander Majors was born October 4, 1814, in Franklin, Kentucky. In 1820, his family moved to the Missouri Territory, settling in the Sni-A-Bar Creek. On November 6, 1836, he married Catherine Stalcup.

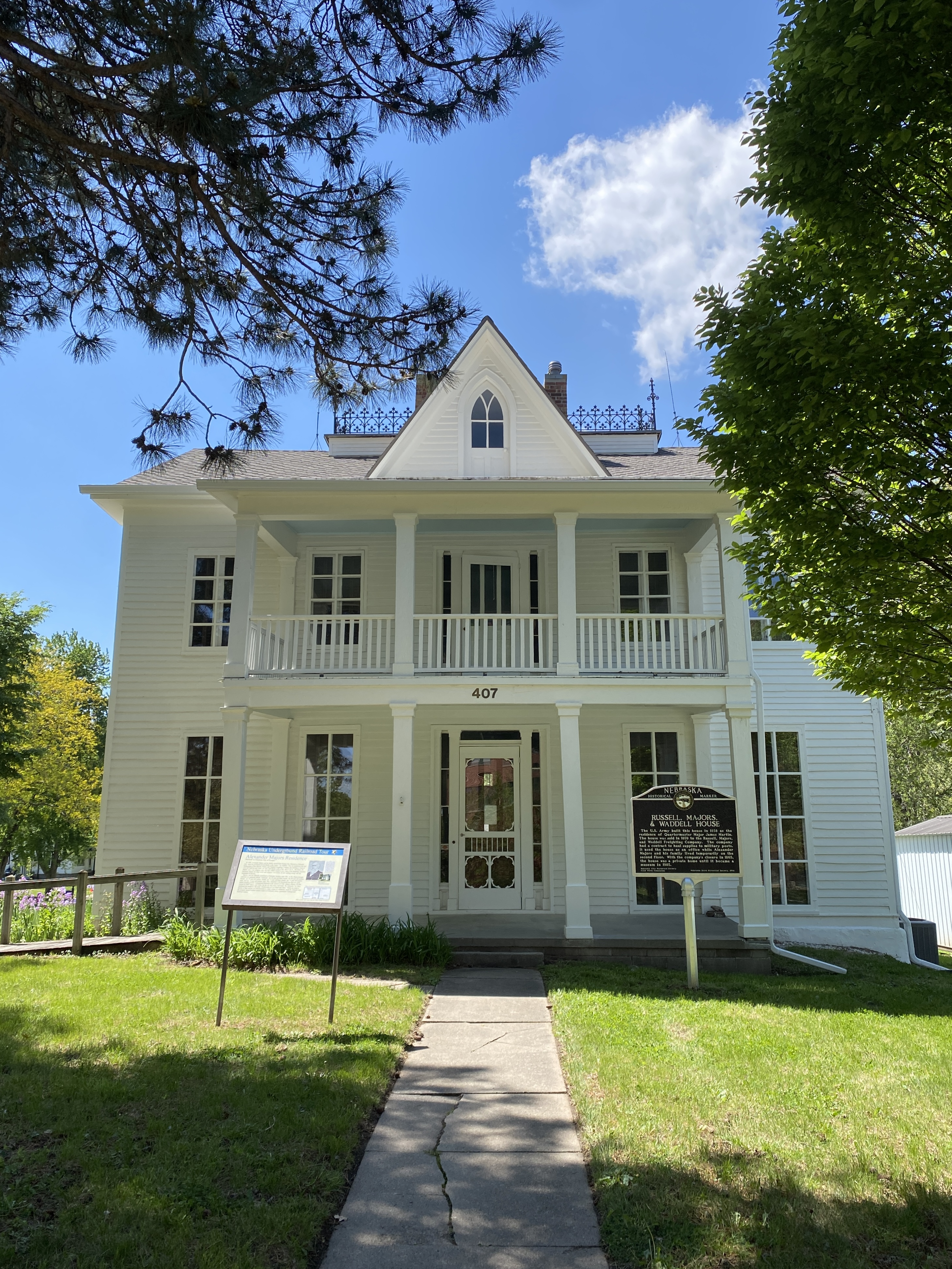
Russell, Majors, and Waddell Freighting Company Headquarters, Nebraska City, 2026

In 1858, Majors moved with his family from Kansas City, Missouri to Nebraska City, where he established the headquarters of the Russell, Majors, and Waddell Freighting Company. His home is now a private residence, and the freighting headquarters is preserved as the Old Freighters Museum.

Slavery was not prohibited in Nebraska Territory until 1861. When Majors moved to Nebraska, he brought six enslaved African Americans with him. In the summer of 1860, they escaped on the Underground Railroad. Majors offered a $1,000 reward for their capture and return, but they were never found. In a letter written by abolitionist and Underground Railroad conductor Josiah B. Grinnell, it is documented that the freedom seekers made it to Grinnell, Iowa, a prominent Underground Railroad station.

== Overland freight ==
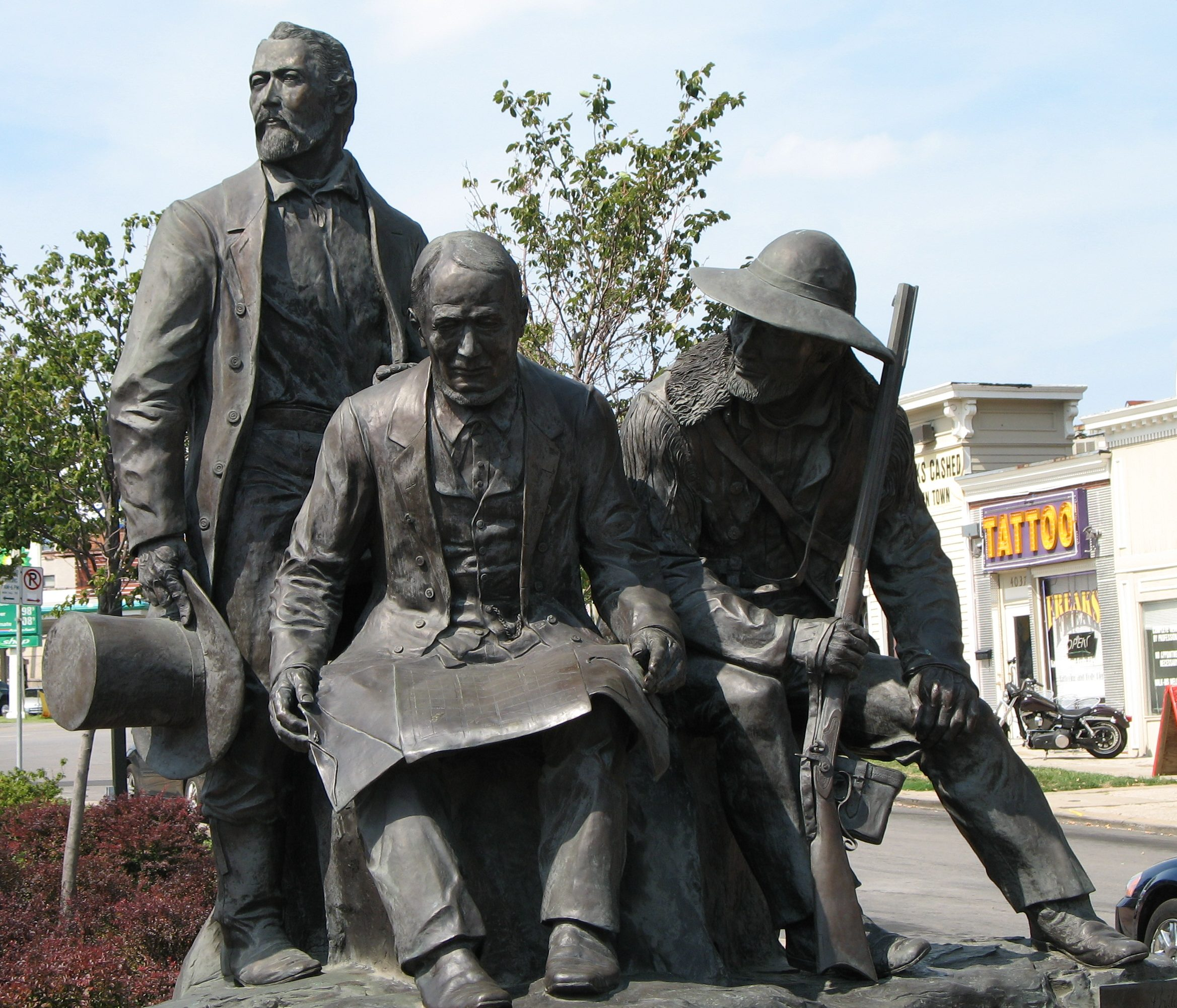
Alexander Majors (left) is honored together with Kansas City "father" John Calvin McCoy and Mountainman Jim Bridger at Pioneer Square in Westport in Kansas City.

In 1848, Alexander Majors started hauling overland freight on the Santa Fe Trail. On his first trip, he set a new time record of 92 days for the 1564-mile (2500 km) round trip. Eventually he employed 4,000 men, including a 15-year-old lad named Billy Cody, later known as Buffalo Bill. Cody became one of his most famous Pony Express riders.

In 1853, Majors was awarded federal contracts to haul supplies to United States Army posts along the Santa Fe Trail. Majors helped establish the Kansas City, Missouri stockyards. This became a center of marketing and shipping beef from Texas and the Southwest by railroad to the East Coast and Midwest.

In 1854, he teamed up with William B. Waddell and William Hepburn Russell. Majors was responsible for the freighting part of the business, Waddell was to manage the office, and Russell was to use his Washington DC contacts to acquire new contracts. Waddell chose be a silent partner, so the firm was initially called "Majors and Russell". In the 1850s, their firm Russell, Majors and Waddell and the short-lived Pony Express were major businesses, contributing to the growth of Kansas City. Majors was very religious and had a Bible issued to every man in the freighting company.

Majors' Overland Stage Company was part of a wide network that reached into the frontier West. Fifteen years later, changes in transportation had put the company out of business. On the Missouri side of State Line at 81st Street, Majors built a two-story frame farmhouse in 1855 (later a museum). From there, wagon trains headed west loaded with goods from his warehouse located on the Missouri River. In Westport, Majors operated a meat-packing plant. It supplied the trains with cured pork, soap and candles. For 15 years Majors and his far-flung interests were highly successful.

In about 1860, their freight firm, later to become "Russell, Majors and Waddell," formed the Central Overland California and Pikes Peak Express Company to try to get the federal contract to deliver mail between Missouri and California. The contract had previously been held by Butterfield Overland Mail, which delivered the mail in 25 days or more over a route that went through the South. With sectional tensions on the rise, Majors and his colleagues proposed to deliver the mail over a central route through Salt Lake City, Utah and proposed doing it in 10 days, via a horse relay they called the Pony Express.

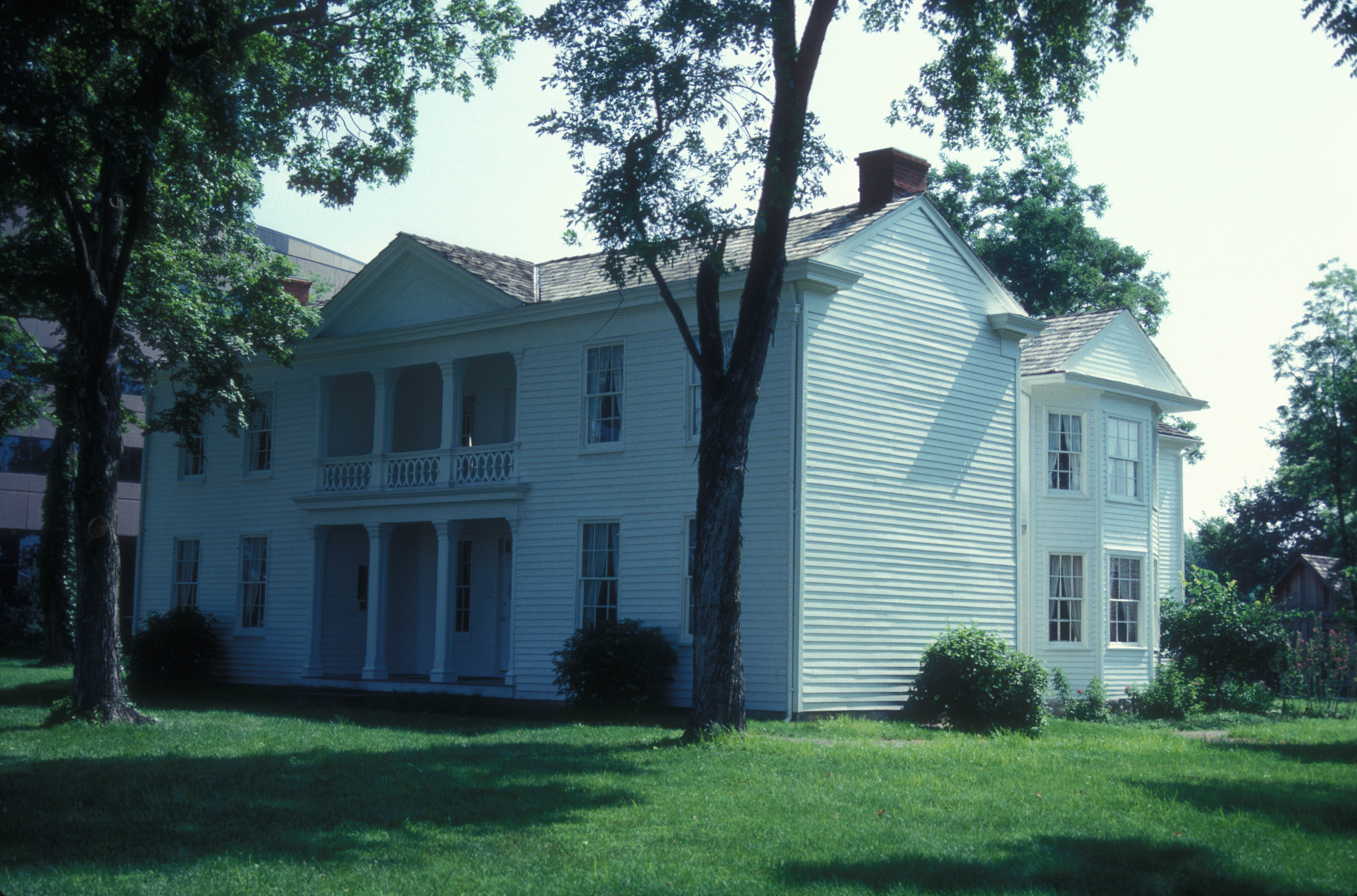
Alexander Majors House, 2007

By 1865, Majors sold out what little remained of his business and moved to Colorado. Thirty years later, his former young wagonmaster and Pony Express rider, Buffalo Bill, found him. He was old, ill and penniless. Cody helped him, taking Majors on as part of the Cody Wild West show. Majors lived at Cody's Scouts' Rest Ranch in North Platte, Nebraska for a time.

Majors died in Chicago, Illinois, on January 13, 1900, aged 85. He is buried in Union Cemetery in Kansas City, Missouri.

== See also ==
- Pony Express
- Postage stamps and postal history of the United States
- SS Alexander Majors
