= Fort Morgan Cut-Off =

Former trail in Colorado, U.S.

The Fort Morgan Cut-Off of the Overland Stage Company (formerly the Central Overland, California, and Pike's Peak Express Company) was a stage route that passed through Adams County, Colorado. It was established in September 1862 as an offshoot of the Overland Trail. The established stage route traveled through the present-day towns of Greeley and Laporte in northern Colorado. In LaPorte, Overland operated the LaPorte Station. Just south of Greeley, Overland operated the Latham Station. The Sherwood Station Site was on the Fort Morgan Cut-Off center. A connecting trail known as the Denver Road followed the South Platte River to Denver and the surrounding mining towns. The Fort Morgan Cut-off bypassed the stations between Fort Morgan, Colorado and Laporte and went directly to Denver.

== Stations ==
- Bijou Stage Station
- Living Springs Stage Station
- Kiowa Stage Station (now Bennett, Colorado)
- Box Elder Stage Station (now Watkins, Colorado)
- Coal Creek Stage Station (located in present-day Aurora, Colorado)
- Toll Gate Stage Station (located in present-day Aurora, Colorado)

== See also ==
- Ben Holladay founder of the Fort Morgan Cut-Off

== Sources ==
- Wagner, Albin. "Overland Stage First Mass Transit System". Adams County Crossroads of the West 2:18-19 Denver Colorado: Century Graphics (1977). ISBN 0-930952-01-4 (accessed September 4, 2006)
