= Tarryall Reservoir =

Reservoirs in Colorado, United States

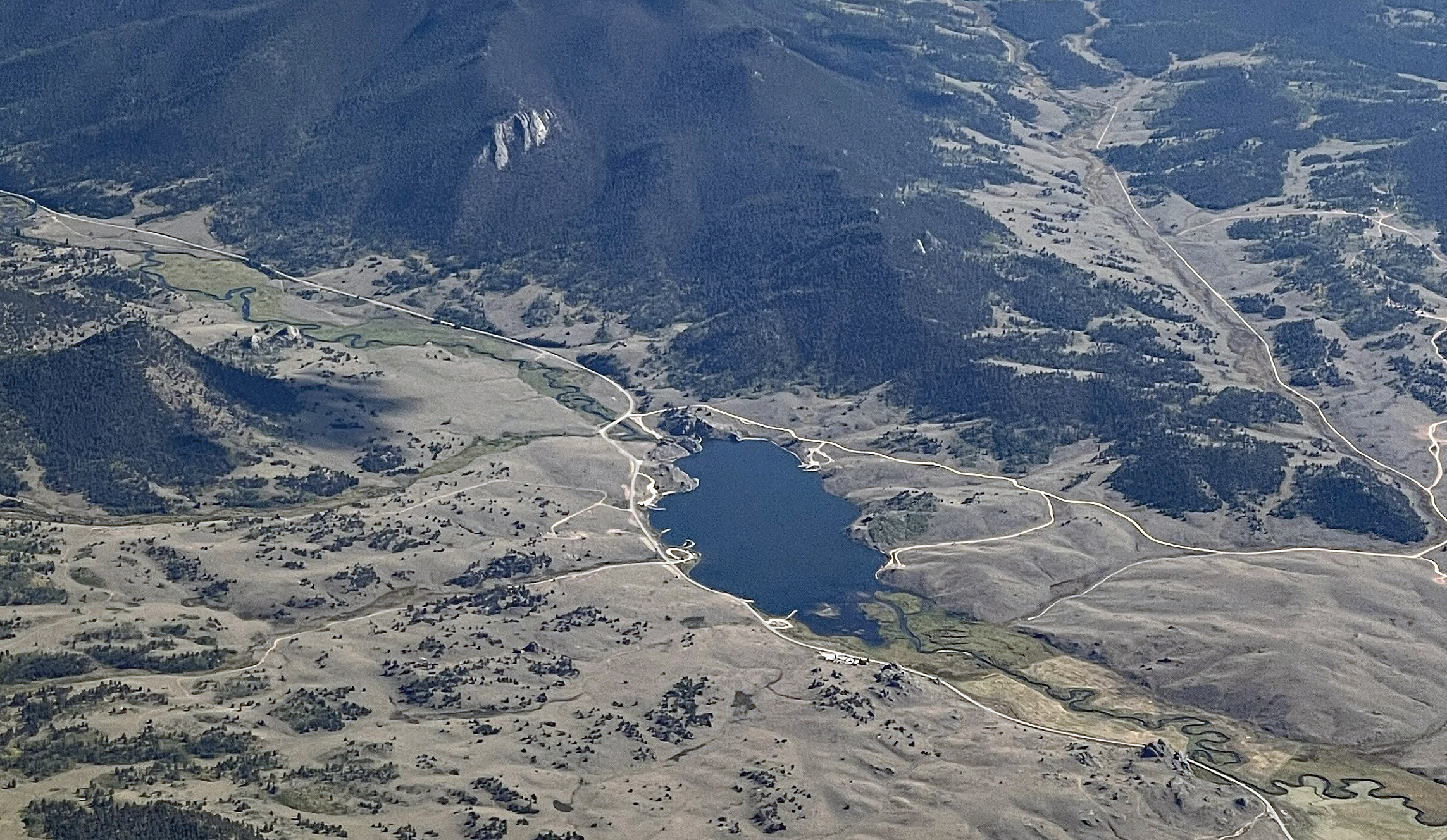
- Aerial view (2024)

- The reservoir's location in Colorado
- Location: Colorado
- Coordinates: 39°13′43.99″N 105°36′41.59″W
- Primary inflows: Tarryall Creek
- Primary outflows: Tarryall Creek
- Basin countries: United States
- Managing agency: Colorado Parks and Wildlife
- Surface area: 175 acres (71 hectares)
- Surface elevation: 8,865 feet (2,702 meters)
- Frozen: Freezes in winter

Tarryall Reservoir lies in Park County, Colorado, U.S. east of Fairplay. The reservoir and the land around it make up the Tarryall Reservoir State Wildlife Area. The wildlife area borders the Pike National Forest.

== Dam ==
Built in 1929, the Tarryall Dam is a concrete gravity dam that impounds Tarryall Creek. The 70-foot (21-meter) high dam stores 1,580 acre-feet (1,950,000 cubic meters) of water. Colorado Parks and Wildlife owns the dam, and its NID ID# is CO00342.

== State wildlife area ==
The 711-acre (288-hectare) Tarryall Reservoir State Wildlife Area centers on the reservoir. Located 16.5 miles (26.6 kilometers) southeast of the hamlet of Jefferson, Colorado on Park County Road 77, the wildlife area offers coldwater lake and stream fishing, waterfowl and big game hunting, and wildlife viewing and camping.

== History ==
The reservoir was originally planned to function as a fish hatchery, but this effort ended, and now it offers outdoor recreation. It lies within the Tarryall Rural Historic District, an historic district listed on the U.S. National Register of Historic Places.
