= William Bradford Waddell =

American pony express founder (1807–1872)

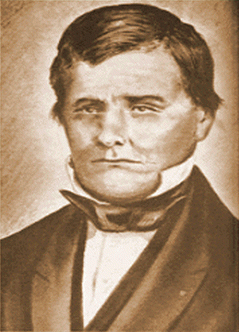
- Born: October 17, 1807; Fauquier County, Virginia, U.S.
- Died: April 1, 1872 (aged 64); Lexington, Missouri, U.S.

William Bradford Waddell (1807–1872) is often credited along with Alexander Majors and William Hepburn Russell as the founders, owners, and operators of the Pony Express. He is described as "phlegmatic, stoical, inclined to sulk if displeased, a cautious penny-pincher, and unable to reach a decision without ponderous deliberation."

== Early life ==
Waddell was born on October 17, 1807, in Fauquier County, Virginia to parents of Scottish descent. Following the remarriage of his father in 1811, he and his family moved to Mason County, Kentucky a busy center of immigration activity. In 1824, at the age of 17, he ventured from home to first work in the lead mines at Galena, Illinois, and then to St. Louis, Missouri, clerked for a time in the Berhoud & McCreery dry goods store. He returned to Kentucky soon after. On January 1, 1829, he married Susan Byram and settled down to farm. Finding farming not to his liking, he moved and opened a successful dry goods store in Mayslick, Kentucky.

== Early business ventures ==
In 1835, Waddell again moved his family, this time to Lexington, Missouri, where he opened another dry goods store on the waterfront near Jack's Ferry. In 1837, he joined William Hepburn Russell, and others in creating the Lexington First Addition Company, the Lexington Fire and marine Insurance Company and the Lexington Female Collegiate Institute. He was also able to build a brick store and a hemp warehouse.

Waddell's first experience with the freighting business came through his partnership with Russell. In 1853, they created Waddell & Russell, a wholesale trading firm. Later that year, they hauled military supplies by wagon train to Fort Riley, Kansas, and Fort Union, New Mexico. The firm failed to obtain a contract the following year.

== The Pony Express ==
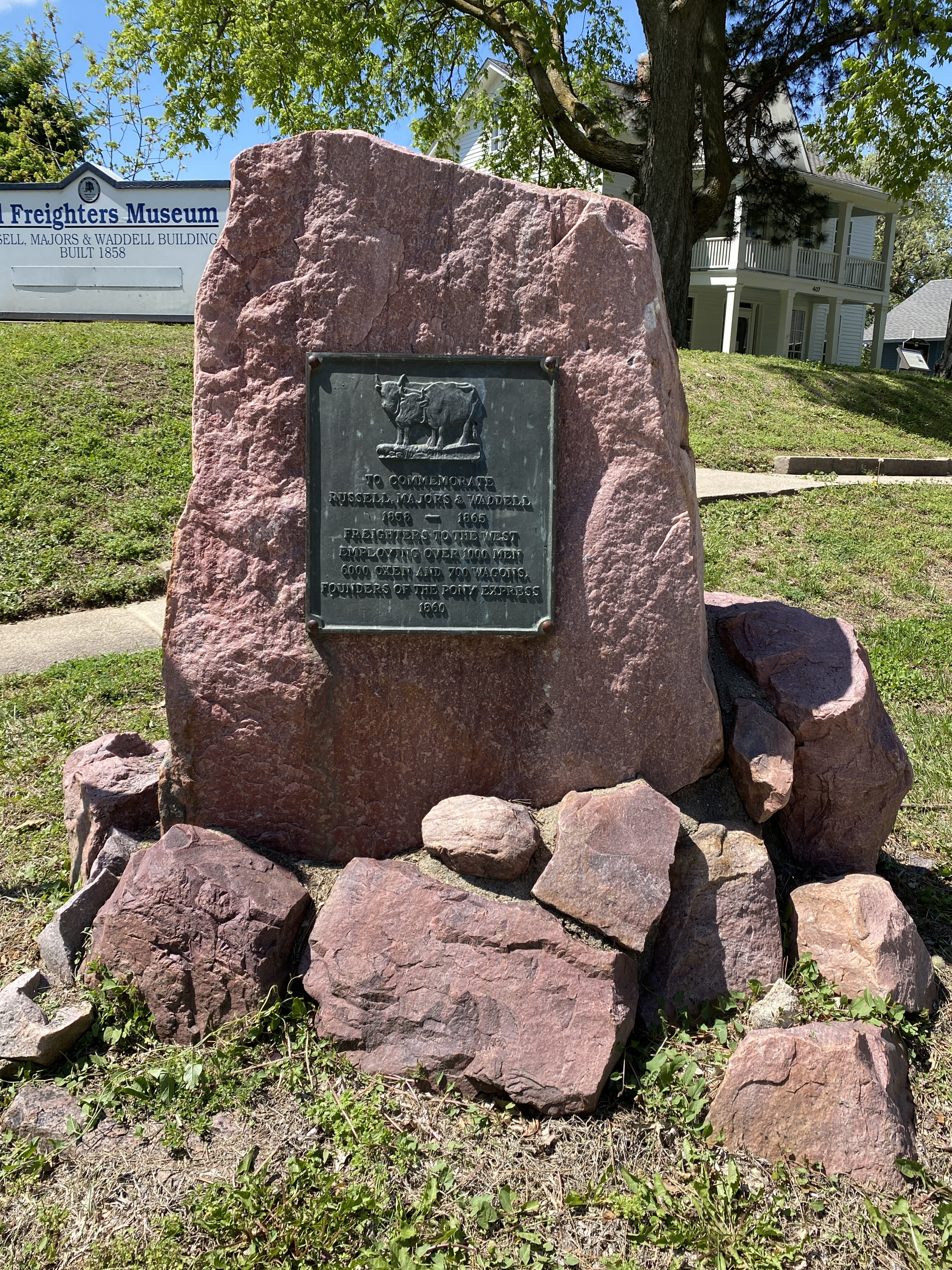
Monument to Russell, Majors and Waddell, Nebraska City, 2026

Waddell and Russell brought on a new partner, Alexander Majors, and on January 1, 1855, the new firm of Russell, Majors and Waddell was created. This firm obtained a consolidated contract with the War Department to supply the majority of military forts west of the Missouri River. Later the firm started a stagecoach company, the Central Overland California and Pikes Peak Express Company, with the hope of receiving a mail contract from Missouri to California. Under charter from the Kansas legislature, the C.O.C. & P.P.E Company started an express mail business called the Pony Express which began operations on April 3, 1860. Waddell supervised the business activities of the office from the headquarters of the firm in Lexington, Missouri, and later Leavenworth, Kansas. The Pony Express would prove to be a failure, losing upwards of $1,000 a day. By October 1861, the Express was out of business due to the completion of the telegraph lines and the unwillingness of the national government to provide further funding.

== Later years ==
Following the failure of the Pony Express in 1861 and a financing scandal created by Russell, Waddell retired to his home in Lexington and never entered business again. He acquired the Waddell House in 1869. However, his life was not peaceful. The effects of the American Civil War were personally felt when one of his sons was killed defending a slave. Additionally, his home was raided multiple times and he was forced to sign an oath of allegiance to the United States. Due to taxes and debts he had incurred, he was required to sell his land. He died April 1, 1872, at age 65 in the home of his daughter. He is buried in Lexington, Missouri.

== See also ==
- Pony Express
- Pony Express Bible
- Central Overland California and Pikes Peak Express Company
- William Hepburn Russell
- Alexander Majors

== Bibliography ==
- Moody, Ralph (1967). Stagecoach West. New York: Thomas Y. Crowell Company.
- Settle, Raymond W.; Settle, Mary Lund (1955). Saddles and Spurs: The Pony Express Saga. Lincoln, Nebraska: University of Nebraska Press.
- Settle, Raymond W.; Settle, Mary Lund (1966). War Drums and Wagon Wheels: The Story of Russell, Majors, and Waddell. Lincoln, Nebraska: University of Nebraska Press.
