= Briartown, Oklahoma =

- Census-designated place
- Location within Oklahoma Location within the United States
- Coordinates: 35°17′50″N 95°14′19″W
- Country: United States
- State: Oklahoma
- County: Muskogee

Area
  - Total: 6.02 sq mi (15.59 km^{2})
  - Land: 6.02 sq mi (15.59 km^{2})
  - Water: 0 sq mi (0.00 km^{2})
- Elevation: 551 ft (168 m)

Population (2020)
  - Total: 185
  - Density: 30.7/sq mi (11.86/km^{2})
- Time zone: UTC-6 (Central (CST))
  - Summer (DST): UTC-5 (CDT)
- ZIP Code: 74455 (Porum)
- Area code: 580
- GNIS feature ID: 2805307
- FIPS code: 40-08700

Briartown is an unincorporated community and census-designated place in Muskogee County, Oklahoma, United States. As of the 2020 census, it had a population of 185.

== Geography ==
Briartown is located along Oklahoma State Highway 2 in far southern Muskogee County, 3 miles (5 km) north of Whitefield, 5 miles (8 km) south of Porum, and 34 miles (55 km) south of Muskogee, the county seat.

According to the U.S. Census Bureau, the Briartown CDP has an area of 6.02 square miles (15.6 km^{2}), all land. The Canadian River, which forms the Haskell County line, passes just south of the community.

== Demographics ==
Historical population
Census	Pop.	Note	%±
2020	185		—
U.S. Decennial Census

Briartown was first listed as a census-designated place for the 2020 census.

=== 2020 census ===
As of the 2020 census, Briartown had a population of 185. The median age was 52.8 years. 18.4% of residents were under the age of 18 and 25.4% of residents were 65 years of age or older. For every 100 females there were 131.2 males, and for every 100 females age 18 and over there were 128.8 males age 18 and over.

0.0% of residents lived in urban areas, while 100.0% lived in rural areas.

There were 83 households in Briartown, of which 19.3% had children under the age of 18 living in them. Of all households, 50.6% were married-couple households, 28.9% were households with a male householder and no spouse or partner present, and 15.7% were households with a female householder and no spouse or partner present. About 30.1% of all households were made up of individuals and 16.9% had someone living alone who was 65 years of age or older.

There were 83 housing units, of which 0.0% were vacant. The homeowner vacancy rate was 0.0% and the rental vacancy rate was 0.0%.

Racial composition as of the 2020 census
Race	Number	Percent
White	115	62.2%
Black or African American	0	0.0%
American Indian and Alaska Native	59	31.9%
Asian	0	0.0%
Native Hawaiian and Other Pacific Islander	0	0.0%
Some other race	2	1.1%
Two or more races	9	4.9%
Hispanic or Latino (of any race)	6	3.2%
