= William Greeneberry Russell =

- Born: 1818; South Carolina.
- Died: 1877 (aged 58–59); Briartown, Oklahoma
- Other name: Green
- Occupations: farmer and gold prospector and miner
- Known for: gold discoveries

William Greeneberry "Green" Russell (1818–1877) was an American gold prospector and miner.

== Early life ==
Green Russell was born in South Carolina but moved with his family to Georgia as a small child. His father James Russell engaged in gold mining during the Georgia Gold Rush that started in 1828 and Green came of age in a local economy dominated by mining. In 1845 he married Susan Willis who was 1/8th Cherokee.

== Mining in California ==
When gold was found at Sutter's Mill in 1848, a cook for Sutter's crew who was a Georgia native sent word back home enabling Russell to learn of the discovery. Russell led a couple of successful mining ventures to California which included his brothers and other Georgians including Cherokees, some of whom made the trek west overland through the Rockies.

== Colorado Gold ==
Russell had spent his boyhood in the Cherokee country near Dahlonega, site of the only significant gold rush east of the Mississippi, in what would become Dawson County, along the Etowah River. Circa 1850 he purchased 500 acres of property on the Etowah River, for $10,000. Much of this property is still held by his descendants. Russell Creek, which flows into the Etowah River, is named for his family and there are family members buried in the Palmer/McClure cemetery on the property. His home is still there, maintained much as it was in his day by his descendants. The bonanza in California sent him across the continent in 1849, and along the way he panned a little gold in the Sweetwater River, in southwest Wyoming just east of the Rockies. During the next few years Russell moved restlessly - home to Georgia, back to the Pacific, then home again in 1852. Then, through his Cherokee connections Russell heard about an 1849 discovery of gold along the South Platte River at the foot of the Rocky Mountains. He organized a party to prospect along the South Platte River, setting off with his two brothers and six companions in February 1858. They rendezvoused with Cherokee tribe members along the Arkansas River in present-day Oklahoma and continued westward along the Santa Fe Trail. Others joined the party along the way until their number reached 107. The few accounts of Russell suggest a confident man who inspired trust. In a later portrait he has a direct, drowsy-eyed look of assurance. Whatever his appeal, Russell convinced the others to stand against adversities the expedition may have presented

Upon reaching Bent's Fort, they turned to the northwest, reaching the confluence of Cherry Creek and the South Platte on June 23. The site of their initial explorations is in present-day Confluence Park in Denver. They began prospecting in the river beds, exploring Cherry Creek and nearby Ralston Creek but without success. After twenty days, several decided to return home, leaving the Russell brothers and ten other men behind. In the first week of July 1858, Green Russell and Sam Bates found a small placer deposit near the mouth of Little Dry Creek that yielded about 20 troy ounces (620 g) of gold, then worth about 380 dollars (about $44,000 USD today), the first significant gold discovery in the Rocky Mountain region. Word of gold first reached the rest of the nation when an old trader named John Cantrell who had visited the Russell diggings arrived in Kansas City in 1858 with samples to back up his story. Newspapers began to print stories of the findings, starting the Pike's Peak Gold Rush.

In early 1859, Russell was drawn to the mountains by the discovery of gold in nearby Gregory Gulch. He discovered placer gold deposits in June 1859 in the valley that was soon named Russell Gulch in his honor. By the end of September, 891 men were mining gold in the gulch, and the eponymous town was built near the head of the gulch to serve the miners.

While his mining activities were successful, the political environment turned against Green as Union men began to outnumber southerners. Green attempted to get back to Georgia but his party was first struck by smallpox and then intercepted by the Union army.

== Later years ==
After the Civil War Russell returned to Colorado but was not as successful as he had been previously. After the death of his son John in a mining accident in 1874 he sought to gain land in the Indian Territory through his Cherokee wife. He settled there but was contemplating a return to Georgia when he became ill and died in 1877. He is buried at Briartown, Oklahoma.

== Places named for Russell ==
Two towns in Colorado are named after Russell, both in locations where he found gold: Russellville, now an unincorporated suburban community in Douglas County, and Russell Gulch, a former mining town in Gilpin County.

According to City and County of Denver records, the parcel of land at 37th and Vine street known as Russell Square Park was named after W. Green Russell in 1914. Parks and Recreation document dated September 1967. Legal Description: Block 8 of Cheesman and Moffat's Addition, NE 1/4 Sec.26-T3S-R68W.

In downtown Denver, the bar Green Russell derives its name from Russell.

== See also ==
- Pike's Peak Gold Rush
- Russell's Gulch, Colorado
