= Little Dry Creek (Arapahoe County, Colorado) =

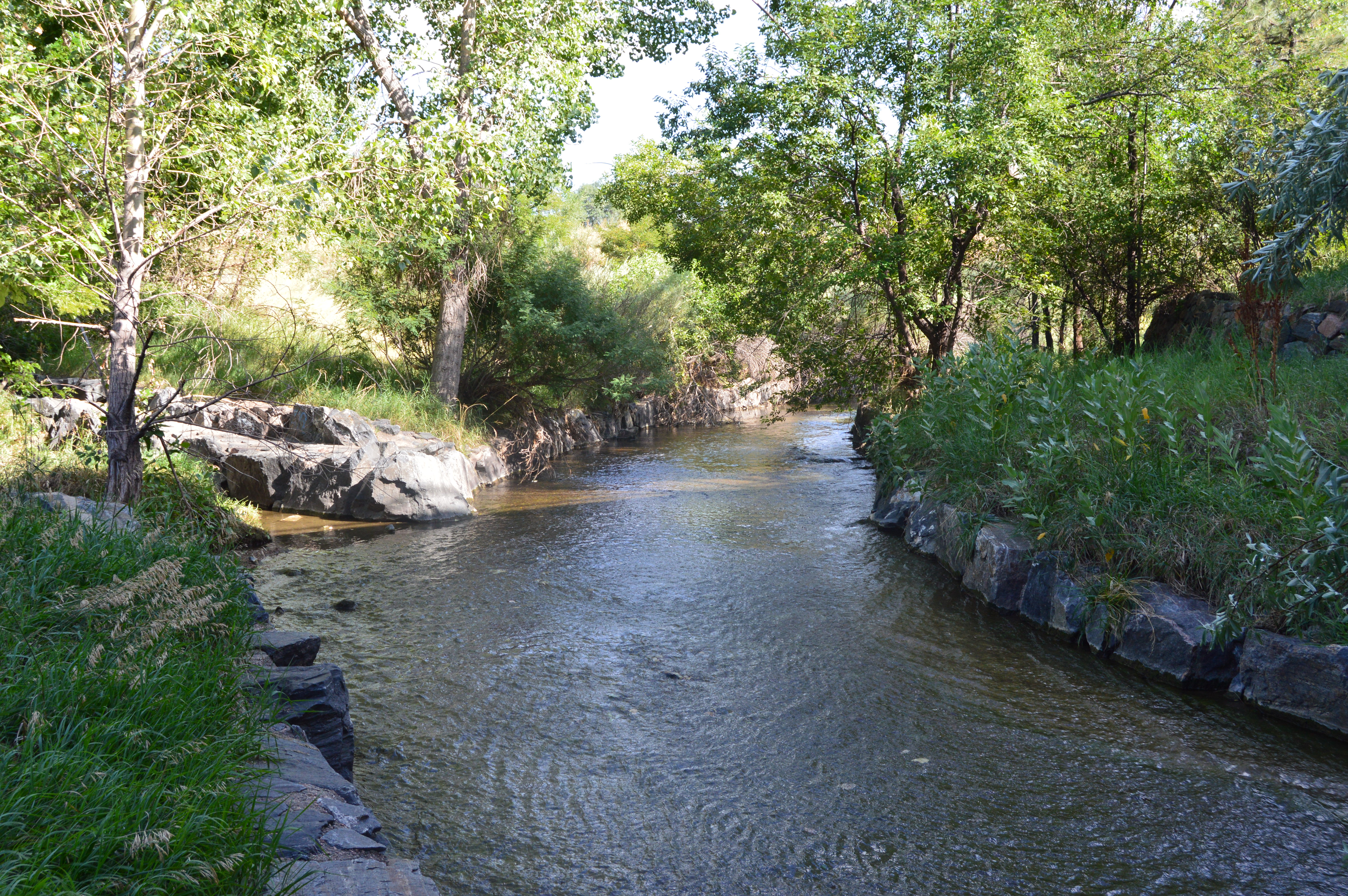

Physical characteristics
- Source
  - coordinates: 39°35′27″N 104°52′55″W
- Mouth
  - location: Confluence with South Platte
  - coordinates: 39°39′34.87″N 105°00′9.64″W
  - elevation: 5,256 ft (1,602 m)

Basin features
- Progression: South Platte—Platte— Missouri—Mississippi

Little Dry Creek is a short tributary of the South Platte River, approximately 10 miles (16 km) long, in Arapahoe County, Colorado in the United States. The creek drains a suburban area south of Denver. It rises in Centennial, Arapahoe County, west of I-25, and flows generally northwest into Englewood. It has historically been used for irrigation and feeds an aqueduct that runs parallel to it. The creek flows into South Platte just south of West Dartmouth Avenue approximately two tenths of a mile west of its intersection with Santa Fe Drive which is US 85.

The Little Dry Creek Trail intersects the Highline Canal Trail in Cherry Hills Village.

The mouth of the creek is noted as the location of the first significant gold discovery in present-day Colorado. In the first week of July 1858, Green Russell and his brothers discovered a placer gold deposit that yielded about 20 troy ounces (620 g) of gold, then worth about 380 dollars (about $44,000 USD today.) The discovery set off the Pike's Peak Gold Rush.

== See also ==
- List of rivers of Colorado
