= Pike's Peak gold rush =

Nineteenth-century gold-prospecting frenzy in Colorado, US

Coordinates: 39°39′35″N 105°00′10″W

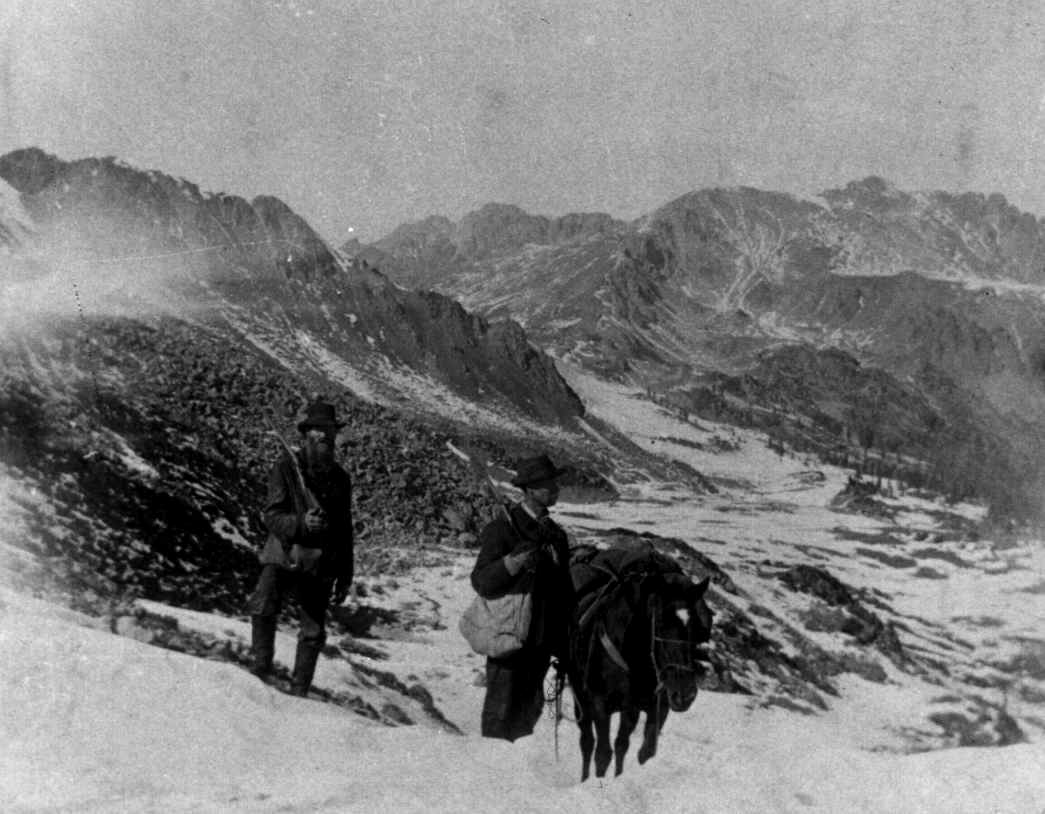
Gold prospectors in the Rocky Mountains of western Kansas Territory

The Pike's Peak gold rush (later known as the Colorado gold rush) was the boom in gold prospecting and mining in the Pike's Peak Country of western Kansas Territory and southwestern Nebraska Territory of the United States that began in July 1858 and lasted until roughly the creation of the Colorado Territory on February 28, 1861. An estimated 100,000 gold seekers took part. The dramatic but temporary influx of migrants and immigrants came to the Southern Rocky Mountains. The prospectors provided the first major White American population in the region.

The rush, centered 85 miles (137 km) north of Pikes Peak, created a few towns such as Denver City and Boulder City that later developed into cities. Scores of other mining camps have faded into ghost towns, but Central City, Black Hawk, Georgetown, and Idaho Springs remained.

== Discovery ==
As the hysteria of the California Gold Rush faded, many discouraged gold seekers returned home. Rumors of gold in the Rocky Mountains persisted and several small parties explored the region. In the summer of 1857, a party of Spanish-speaking gold seekers from Taos, New Mexico, worked a placer deposit along the South Platte River about 3 miles (4.8 km) above Cherry Creek at a location later known as Mexican Diggings near the Overland Park Golf Course in Denver.

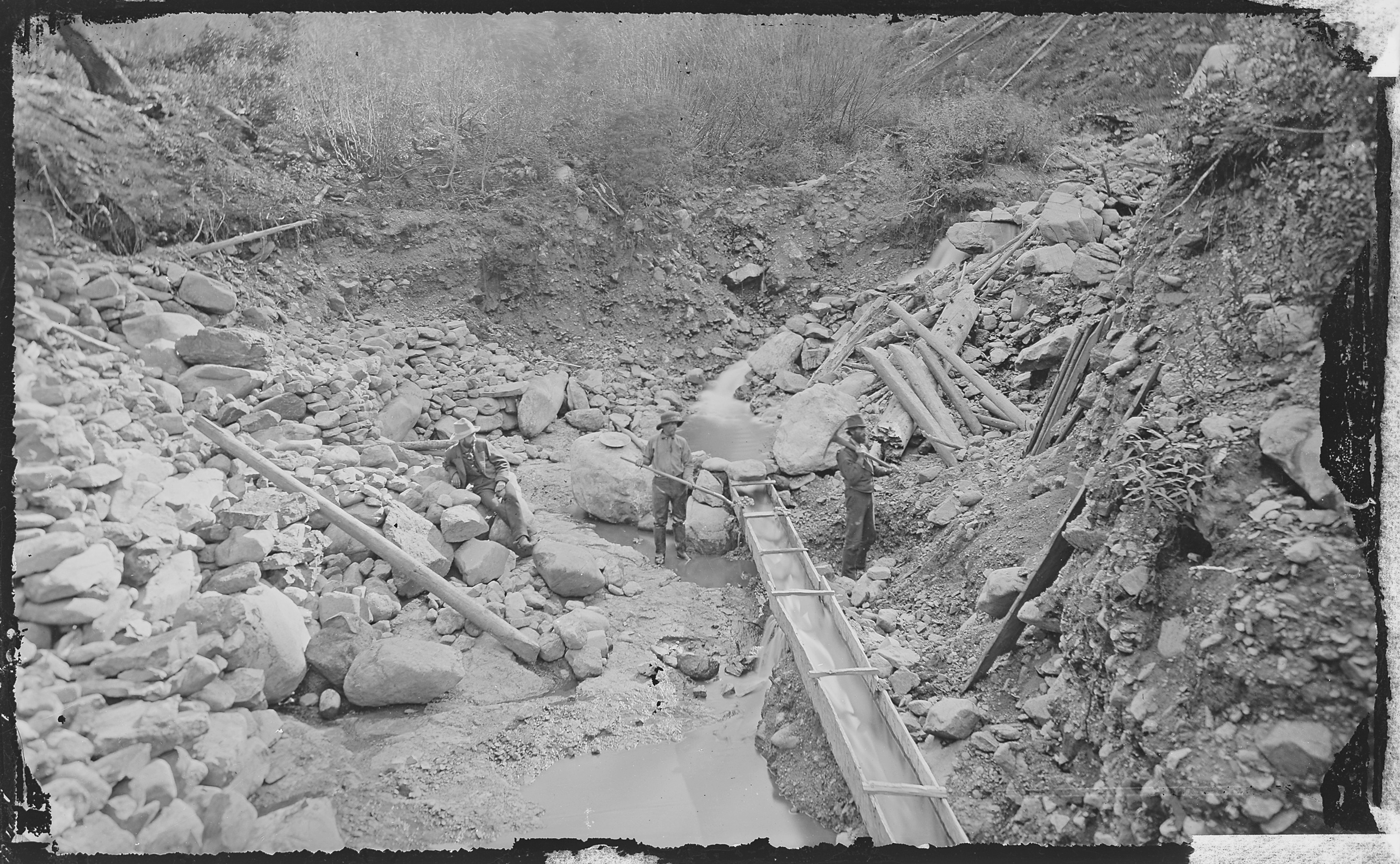
Sluicing for gold, photo by the U.S. Geological and Geographic Survey of the Territories. (1874–1879) Photographer: William Henry Jackson

William Greeneberry "Green" Russell was a Georgian who worked in the California gold fields in the 1850s. In the first week of July 1858, Russell's party found a placer deposit near the mouth of Little Dry Creek that yielded about 20 troy ounces (620 g) of gold, then worth about 380 dollars, or $2,899,680 (as of May, 2026). This was the first significant gold discovery in the Rocky Mountain region. The site of the discovery is in the present-day Denver suburb of Englewood, just north of the junction of U.S. Highway 285 and U.S. Highway 85. This discovery was announced with great excitement by the Kansas City Journal of Commerce on 26 August 1858 with the headline, "THE NEW ELDORADO!! GOLD IN KANSAS!!"

== Initial boom ==
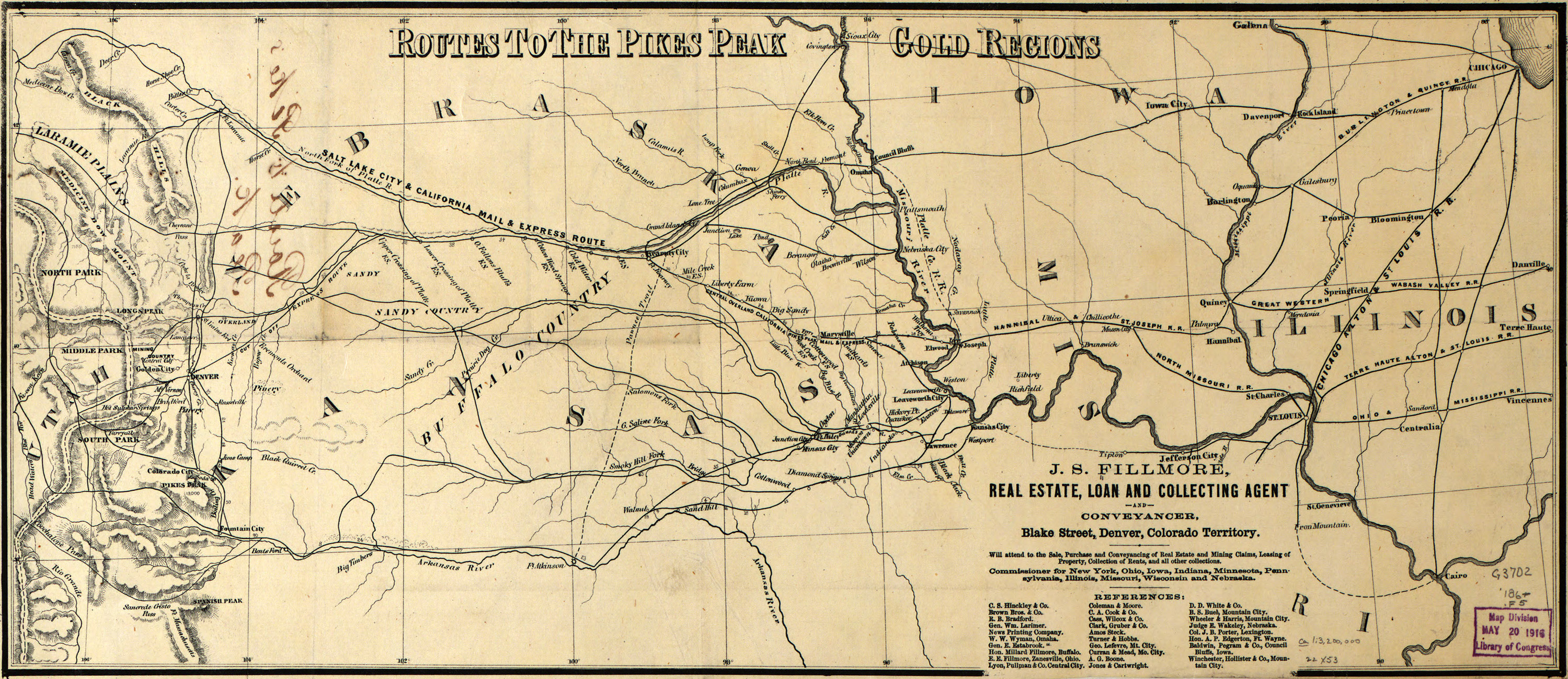
A map from the late 1850s showing prominent routes to the gold regions

The first decade of the boom was largely concentrated along the South Platte River at the base of the Rocky Mountains, in the canyon of Clear Creek in the mountains west of Golden City, at Breckenridge and in South Park at Como, Fairplay, and Alma. By 1860, Denver City, Golden City, and Boulder City were substantial towns that served the mines. Rapid population growth led to the creation of the Colorado Territory in 1861.

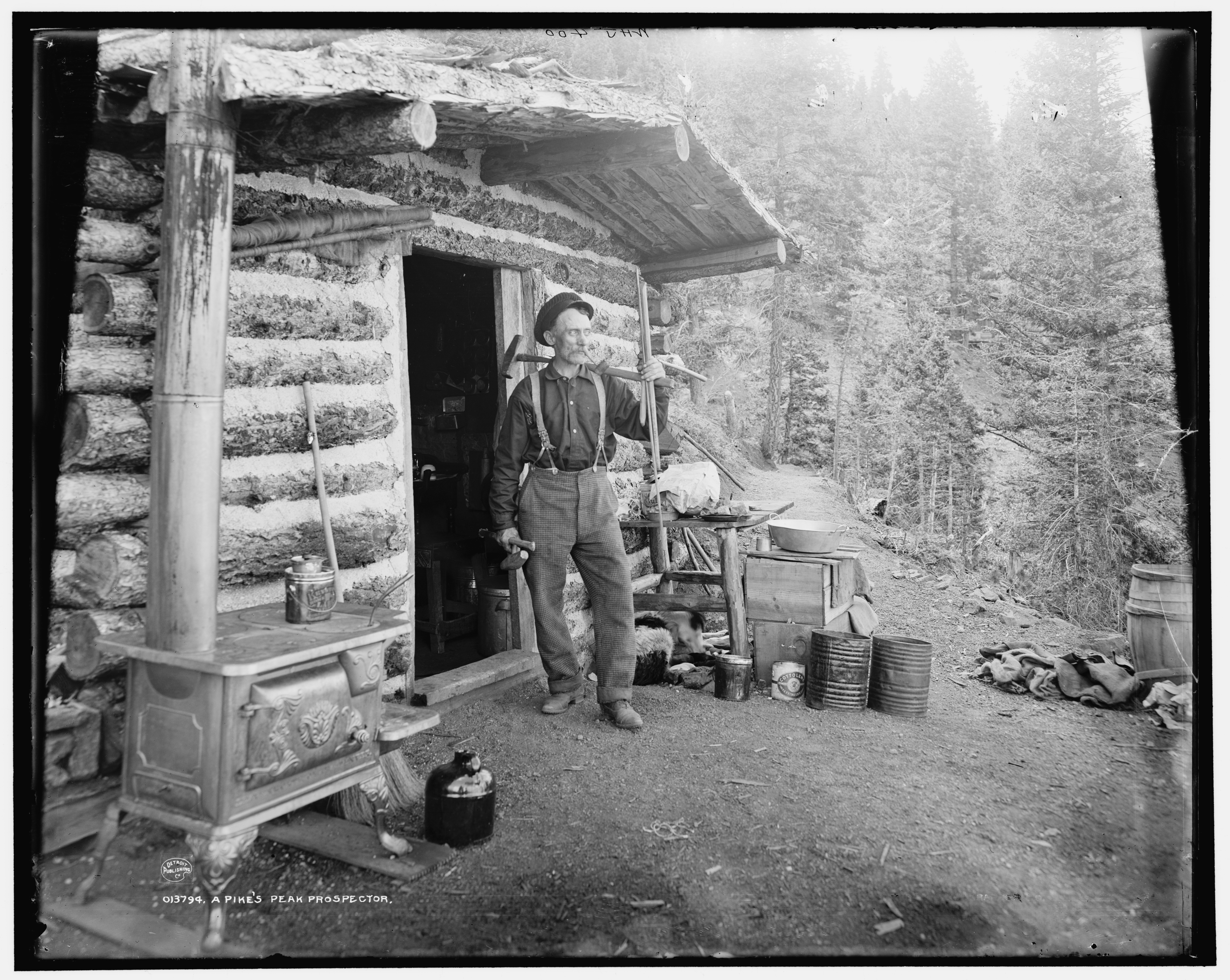
Prospector on Pikes Peak

The Pike's Peak gold rush sent many Americans into a frenzy, prompting them to pack up their belongings and head to Colorado. This initial boom influenced people to begin falsifying information, often sending people out to the west without any proof of a true presence of gold. As early as the spring of 1859, people raced to the Pike's Peak country. Some even dared to go out in the winter of 1858 to try to get a head start, only to realize that they would have to wait until the snow melted to begin mining.

=== Free gold ===
Hardrock mining boomed for a few years, but then declined in the mid-1860s as the miners exhausted the shallow parts of the veins that contained free gold, and found that their amalgamation mills could not recover gold from the deeper sulfide ores. Colorado produced 150,000 troy ounces of gold in 1861 and 225,000 troy ounces in 1862. This led Congress to establish the Denver Mint. Cumulative Colorado production by 1865 was 1.25 million ounces, of which sixty percent was placer gold.

== See also ==
- Australian gold rushes
- Colorado Silver Boom
- Horace Greeley, namesake of Greeley, Colorado, who mined for gold in the rush
- Klondike Gold Rush
- Silver mining in Colorado
- Ute people
- Witwatersrand Gold Rush
