= Montana County, Kansas Territory =

American county from 1859 to 1861

Coordinates: 39°45′N 104°50′W

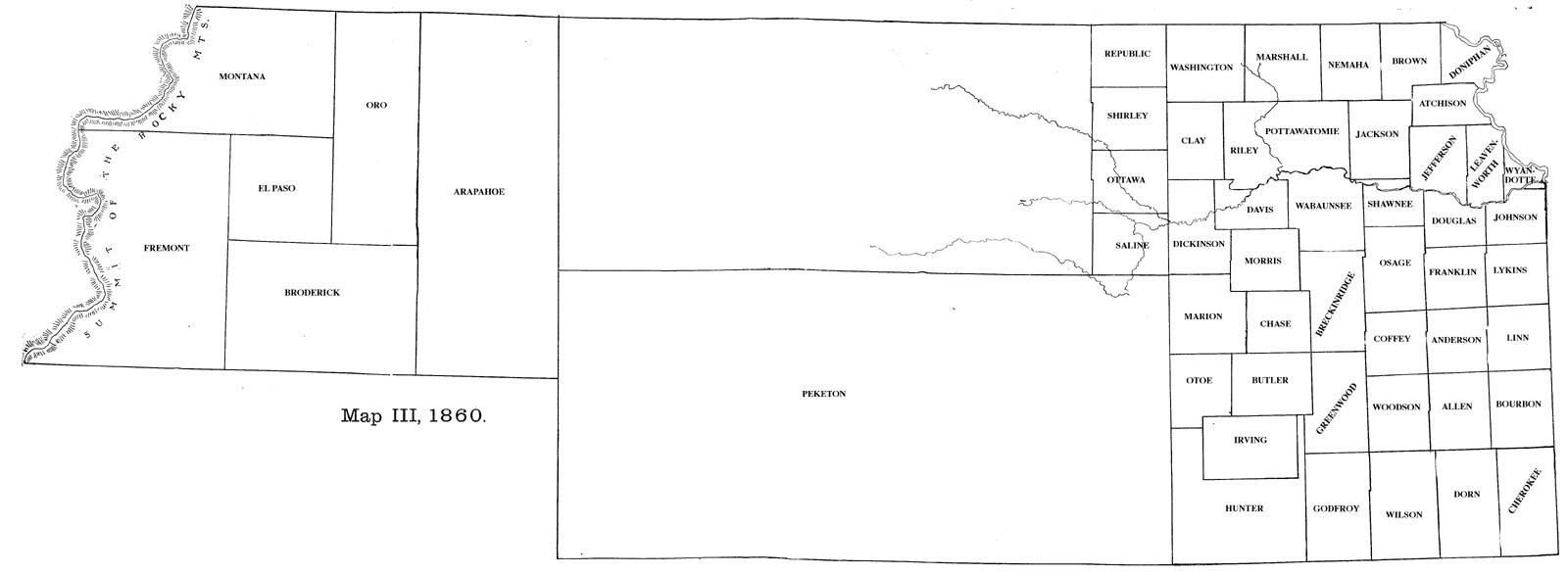
A map of Kansas Territory in 1860. Montana County was located in the territory's western panhandle, bordering Fremont, El Paso, and Oro Counties.

Montana County was a county of the United States Territory of Kansas that existed from February 2, 1859 to January 29, 1861, when Kansas joined the Union as a state.

== History ==
In July 1858, gold was discovered along the South Platte River in Arapahoe County of the Territory of Kansas (now in the State of Colorado). This discovery precipitated the Pike's Peak Gold Rush. To provide local government for the gold mining region, the Kansas Territorial Legislature split Arapahoe County into six counties on 1859-02-07: a much smaller Arapahoe County, Broderick County, El Paso County, Fremont County, Montana County, and Oro County. Montana County was named for the Spanish language name for the Front Range. Montana County included the fledgling gold camps of Denver City, Golden City, and Central City. None of these six counties were ever organized. Many residents of the mining region felt disconnected from the territorial government, and they formed their own Territory of Jefferson on October 24, 1859.

Following the Republican Party election victories in 1860, the United States Congress admitted Kansas to the Union. The Kansas Act of Admission excluded the portion of the Kansas Territory west of the 25th meridian west from Washington from the new state, and Montana County and the rest of this region reverted to unorganized territory.

On February 28, 1861, the Territory of Colorado was organized to govern this unorganized territory and adjacent areas of the Territory of New Mexico, the Territory of Utah, and the Territory of Nebraska. The new Colorado General Assembly organized 17 counties on November 1, 1861.

== See also ==
- Historic Colorado counties
- History of Colorado
- History of Kansas
- Pike's Peak Gold Rush
- Territory of Colorado
- Territory of Jefferson
- Territory of Kansas
