= Arapahoe County, Kansas Territory =

County of Kansas Territory

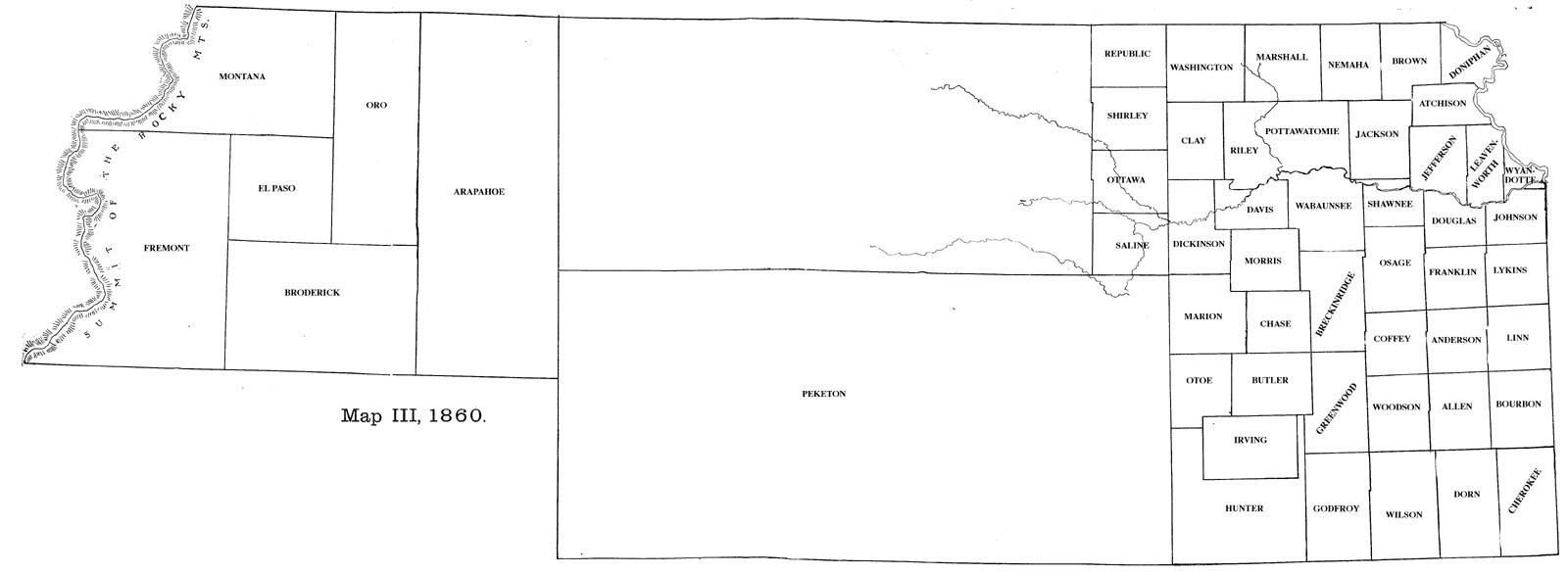
A map of Kansas Territory in 1860. Arapahoe County was located in the territory's western panhandle, between Oro, Broderick, and Peketon Counties.

Arapahoe County was a county of Kansas Territory in the United States that existed from August 25, 1855, until Kansas's admission into the Union on January 29, 1861.

== History ==
On August 25, 1855, the Kansas Territorial Legislature created Arapahoe County to govern the western portion of Kansas Territory (in what is now Colorado). The county was named for the Arapaho Nation of Native Americans that lived in the region.

In July 1858, gold was discovered along the South Platte River in Arapahoe County, precipitating the Pike's Peak Gold Rush. To provide local government for the gold mining region, the Kansas Territorial Legislature split Arapahoe County into six counties on February 7, 1859: a much smaller Arapahoe County, Broderick County, El Paso County, Fremont County, Montana County, and Oro County. None of these six counties were ever organized. Many residents of the mining region felt disconnected from the territorial government, which was seated nearly 600 miles away, and they voted to form their own Territory of Jefferson on October 24, 1859.

Following the Republican Party election victories in 1860, the United States Congress admitted Kansas to the Union on January 29, 1861. The Kansas Act of Admission excluded the portion of the Kansas Territory west of the 25th meridian west from Washington from the new state, and Arapahoe County and the rest of this region reverted to unorganized territory.

On February 28, 1861, Colorado Territory was organized out of the present borders of the State of Colorado to govern this unorganized territory and adjacent areas of New Mexico Territory, Utah Territory, and Nebraska Territory. The new Colorado General Assembly organized 17 counties on November 1, 1861, including a new Arapahoe County.

Another Arapahoe County existed in southwestern Kansas around 1880, when its population was included in the Federal census of that year, but it was never organized. It became defunct in 1883 and its former area was established in 1887 as Haskell County, Kansas.

== See also ==
- Historic Colorado counties
  - Arapahoe County, Kansas Territory
  - Arrappahoe County, Jefferson Territory
  - Arapahoe County, Colorado
  - Adams County, Colorado
  - City and County of Denver, Colorado
  - South Arapahoe County, Colorado
- History of Colorado
- History of Kansas
- Pike's Peak Gold Rush
- Colorado Territory
- Jefferson Territory
- Kansas Territory
