= List of counties in Colorado =

The location of the State of Colorado in the United States of America.

The 64 counties of the U.S. State of Colorado

The U.S. State of Colorado is divided into 64 counties. Two of these, the City and County of Denver, which serves as the state capital, and the City and County of Broomfield, have consolidated city and county governments. In addition to Denver and Broomfield, Pitkin County and Weld County operate as home rule counties with their own county charters. The other 60 counties operate under constitutional governments subject to Dillon's Rule. Counties with constitutional governments have only those powers granted to them under Colorado or federal law, any power implied by those express powers, and those powers essential to the county's existence. Counties are important units of government in Colorado since there are no civil townships or other minor civil divisions.

The United States Census Bureau estimates that El Paso County remains the most populous county in Colorado with a population estimate of 757,040, as of July 1, 2025, while Hinsdale County with a population of 753 is now the least populous. (Note: United States Census Bureau estimates of county population as of July 1, 2025,) Five of the 64 Colorado counties now have more than 500,000 residents, while 12 counties have fewer than 5,000 residents.

Las Animas County, 4,776 square miles (12,369 km^{2}) in area, is the most extensive county, while the City and County of Broomfield, 34 square miles (87 km^{2}) in area, is the least extensive. The City and County of Denver is the most densely populated Colorado county, with a 2025 population density of 4,758 residents per square mile of land area (1,838/km^{2}), while Hinsdale County is the least densely populated county, with a 2025 population density of 0.67 resident per square mile of land area (0.26/km^{2}).

Mount Elbert, the highest summit of Colorado and the entire Rocky Mountains at an elevation of 14,440 feet (4,401.2 m), is located in Lake County. The lowest point in Colorado is where the Arikaree River flows out of Yuma County and into Kansas, at 3,317 feet (1,011 m) elevation. (Note: Elevations are adjusted to the North American Vertical Datum of 1988 (NAVD 88).) This point, which is the highest low point of any state, is higher than the highest points of 18 states and the District of Columbia.

== History ==
On November 1, 1861, the new Territory of Colorado created 17 original counties: Arapahoe, Boulder, Clear Creek, Costilla, Douglas, El Paso, Fremont, Gilpin, Guadalupe, Huerfano, Jefferson, Lake, Larimer, Park, Pueblo, Summit, and Weld; plus the Cheyenne Reserve. Six days later, the name of Guadelupe County was changed to Conejos County.

On February 9, 1866, the first new county, Las Animas, was created, followed by Saguache in December of that year. Bent County was created in February 1870, followed by Greenwood the following month. On February 2, 1874, Grand County and Elbert County were formed, and on February 10, La Plata, Hinsdale, and Rio Grande counties were created. Greenwood was absorbed into Bent on February 5. The last county to be created under the Colorado Territory name was San Juan County, created three months before statehood.

By the time Colorado became a state on August 1, 1876, it had only 26 counties. In January 1877, Routt and Ouray were formed, followed by Gunnison and Custer counties in March. In February 1879, Chaffee County was created. From February 8–10, 1879, Lake county was renamed Carbonate County. In 1881, Dolores County and Pitkin County were created. In 1883, Montrose, Mesa, Garfield, Eagle, Delta, and San Miguel counties were formed, leaving the total number of counties at 39. The number rose to 40 in 1885 with the creation of Archuleta County on April 14. Washington County and Logan County were both created in 1887. Between February 19 and April 16 in 1889, Morgan, Yuma, Cheyenne, Otero, Rio Blanco, Phillips, Sedgwick, Kiowa, Kit Carson, Lincoln, Prowers, Baca, and Montezuma counties were formed, bringing the total to 55. By 1900, Mineral County and Teller County had been added. On November 15, 1902, Arapahoe County was split into Adams and South Arapahoe Counties, and Denver was reconstituted as a consolidated city-county from portions of both newly formed counties on December 1, 1902. By 1912, Jackson County, Moffat County, and Crowley County had been created. Alamosa was created in 1913. In 2001, Broomfield was reconstituted as a consolidated city-county from parts of Adams, Boulder, Jefferson and Weld counties, bringing the total to 64 counties.

== Colorado counties ==
Select the OpenStreetMap link at the right to view the location of these 64 counties.

County	FIPS code (Note: The ANSI INCITS 31:2009 county code is the five-digit code which uniquely identifies counties and county equivalents in the United States. The three-digit number is unique to each individual county within a state, but to be unique within the entire United States, it must be prefixed by the two-digit ANSI INCITS 31:2009 state code. This means that, for example, while Adams County, Colorado is 001, Belknap County, New Hampshire and Alachua County, Florida are also 001. To uniquely identify Adams County, Colorado, one must use the state code of 08 plus the county code of 001; therefore, the unique nationwide identifier for Adams County, Colorado is 08001. The links in the column INCITS are to the Census Bureau Info page for that county.)	County seat	Est.	Formed from	Etymology	Population	Area	Map
Adams County	001	Brighton	Nov 15, 1902	Split from Arapahoe County.	Named in honor of Alva Adams (1850-1922), the 5th, 10th, and 14th Governor of the State of Colorado.	554,668	1,182.29 sq mi (3,062 km^{2})	State map highlighting Adams County
Alamosa County	003	Alamosa	Mar 8, 1913	Split from Costilla County and Conejos County.	Named for the cottonwood trees which grow along the Rio Grande and its tributaries. Alamosa is a Spanish word for a cottonwood grove.	16,688	723.21 sq mi (1,873 km^{2})	State map highlighting Alamosa County
Arapahoe County	005	Littleton	Nov 1, 1861	Created as one of the 17 original counties of the Territory of Colorado. Renamed South Arapahoe County for the five months from November 15, 1902 to April 11, 1903.	Named for predecessor Arapahoe County, Kansas Territory, which in turn was named for the Arapaho Nation of Native Americans.	673,820	804.41 sq mi (2,083 km^{2})	State map highlighting Arapahoe County
Archuleta County	007	Pagosa Springs	Apr 14, 1885	Split from Conejos County.	Named in honor of Colorado State Senator Antonio D. Archuleta (1855-1918) and his father, José Manuel Archuleta (1830-1910).	14,306	1,354.53 sq mi (3,508 km^{2})	State map highlighting Archuleta County
Baca County	009	Springfield	Apr 16, 1889	Split from Las Animas County.	Named in honor of pioneer and Colorado territorial legislator Luis Felipe de Jesús Baca (1828-1874).	3,347	2,558.48 sq mi (6,626 km^{2})	State map highlighting Baca County
Bent County	011	Las Animas	Feb 11, 1870	Split from Huerfano County and former Cheyenne and Arapaho tribal land.	Named in honor of frontier trader William Bent (1809-1869).	5,716	1,541.07 sq mi (3,991 km^{2})	State map highlighting Bent County
Boulder County	013	Boulder	Nov 1, 1861	Created as one of the 17 original counties of the Territory of Colorado.	Named for the abundance of granite boulders along Boulder Creek.	328,560	740.48 sq mi (1,918 km^{2})	State map highlighting Boulder County
City and County of Broomfield	014	Broomfield	Nov 15, 2001	Split from Boulder, Adams, Jefferson, and Weld counties and reorganized as a consolidated city and county.	Named for the broom corn that was formerly grown in the area.	79,174	33.57 sq mi (87 km^{2})	State map highlighting City and County of Broomfield
Chaffee County	015	Salida	Feb 10, 1879	Split from Carbonate County.	Named in honor of Jerome Bunty Chaffee (1825-1886), one of Colorado's first two U.S. Senators from 1876 to 1879.	20,831	1,014.12 sq mi (2,627 km^{2})	State map highlighting Chaffee County
Cheyenne County	017	Cheyenne Wells	Mar 25, 1889	Split from Elbert and Bent counties.	Named for the Cheyenne Nation of Native Americans.	1,713	1,781.90 sq mi (4,615 km^{2})	State map highlighting Cheyenne County
Clear Creek County	019	Georgetown	Nov 1, 1861	Created as one of the 17 original counties of the Territory of Colorado.	Named for Clear Creek which originates in the county.	8,994	396.53 sq mi (1,027 km^{2})	State map highlighting Clear Creek County
Conejos County	021	Conejos	Nov 1, 1861	Guadalupe County, one of the 17 original counties of the Territory of Colorado, was renamed Conejos County after six days on November 7, 1861.	Named for the cottontail rabbits in the area. Conejos is a Spanish word for rabbits.	7,529	1,290.22 sq mi (3,342 km^{2})	State map highlighting Conejos County
Costilla County	023	San Luis	Nov 1, 1861	Created as one of the 17 original counties of the Territory of Colorado.	Named for the Costilla River. Costilla is a Spanish word meaning either little rib or furring timber.	3,679	1,229.38 sq mi (3,184 km^{2})	State map highlighting Costilla County
Crowley County	025	Ordway	May 29, 1911	Split from Otero County.	Named in honor of Colorado State Senator John H. Crowley (1849-1923).	5,677	800.27 sq mi (2,073 km^{2})	State map highlighting Crowley County
Custer County	027	Westcliffe	Mar 9, 1877	Split from Fremont County.	Named in memory of George Armstrong Custer, (1839–1876), the U.S. Army colonel defeated and killed at the Battle of the Little Bighorn.	5,590	739.24 sq mi (1,915 km^{2})	State map highlighting Custer County
Delta County	029	Delta	Feb 11, 1883	Split from Gunnison County.	Named for the town of Delta located at the delta of the Uncompahgre River.	32,178	1,149.44 sq mi (2,977 km^{2})	State map highlighting Delta County
City and County of Denver	031	Denver	Nov 15, 1902	The original Arapahoe County Seat was split from Arapahoe and the newly-created Adams Counties, and reorganized as a consolidated city and county.	Named to curry favor with James W. Denver (1817-1892), Governor of the Territory of Kansas from 1857 to 1859.	740,613	155.66 sq mi (403 km^{2})	State map highlighting City and County of Denver
Dolores County	033	Dove Creek	Feb 19, 1881	Split from Ouray County.	Named for the Dolores River, which was originally named el Rio de Nuestra Senora de los Dolores, which is Spanish for the River of our Lady of Sorrows.	2,466	1,076.93 sq mi (2,789 km^{2})	State map highlighting Dolores County
Douglas County	035	Castle Rock	Nov 1, 1861	Created as one of the 17 original counties of the Territory of Colorado.	Named in honor of Stephen Arnold Douglas, (1813–1861), U.S. Senator from Illinois from 1847 to 1861.	399,396	842.30 sq mi (2,182 km^{2})	State map highlighting Douglas County
Eagle County	037	Eagle	Feb 11, 1883	Split from Summit County.	Named for the Eagle River which originates in the county.	54,291	1,700.76 sq mi (4,405 km^{2})	State map highlighting Eagle County
El Paso County	041	Colorado Springs	Nov 1, 1861	Created as one of the 17 original counties of the Territory of Colorado.	Named for Ute Pass, which connects the Great Plains to South Park and was formerly located within the county. El Paso means the pass in Spanish.	757,040	2,128.60 sq mi (5,513 km^{2})	State map highlighting El Paso County
Elbert County	039	Kiowa	Feb 2, 1874	Split from Douglas County.	Named in honor of Samuel Hitt Elbert (1833-1899), the sixth Governor of the Territory of Colorado.	30,534	1,849.08 sq mi (4,789 km^{2})	State map highlighting Elbert County
Fremont County	043	Cañon City	Nov 1, 1861	Created as one of the 17 original counties of the Territory of Colorado.	Named in honor of John Charles Frémont (1813–1890), the explorer, U.S. Army general, and U.S. Senator from California.	50,039	1,533.09 sq mi (3,971 km^{2})	State map highlighting Fremont County
Garfield County	045	Glenwood Springs	Feb 10, 1883	Split from Summit County.	Named in honor of James Abram Garfield (1831–1881), the twentieth President of the United States.	63,474	2,958.23 sq mi (7,662 km^{2})	State map highlighting Garfield County
Gilpin County	047	Central City	Nov 1, 1861	Created as one of the 17 original counties of the Territory of Colorado.	Named in honor of William Gilpin (1813–1894), the first Governor of the Territory of Colorado.	6,073	150.15 sq mi (389 km^{2})	State map highlighting Gilpin County
Grand County	049	Hot Sulphur Springs	Feb 2, 1874	Split from Summit County.	Named for the Grand River which originates in the county. The Grand River was renamed the Colorado River in 1921, but the county retains the original name.	16,496	1,868.53 sq mi (4,839 km^{2})	State map highlighting Grand County
Gunnison County	051	Gunnison	Mar 9, 1877	Split from Lake County.	Named in honor of John Williams Gunnison (1812-1853), the U.S. Army captain who explored the region.	17,439	3,259.22 sq mi (8,441 km^{2})	State map highlighting Gunnison County
Hinsdale County	053	Lake City	Feb 10, 1874	Split from Lake, Conejos, and Costilla counties.	Named in honor of George Aaron Hinsdale (1826-1874), a Lieutenant Governor of the Territory of Colorado.	753	1,123.35 sq mi (2,909 km^{2})	State map highlighting Hinsdale County
Huerfano County	055	Walsenburg	Nov 1, 1861	Created as one of the 17 original counties of the Territory of Colorado.	Named for Huerfano Butte, a solitary volcanic plug. Huérfano is a Spanish word meaning orphan.	7,011	1,592.37 sq mi (4,124 km^{2})	State map highlighting Huerfano County
Jackson County	057	Walden	May 5, 1909	Split from Larimer County.	Named in honor of Andrew Jackson (1767–1845), the seventh President of the United States.	1,211	1,619.75 sq mi (4,195 km^{2})	State map highlighting Jackson County
Jefferson County	059	Golden	Nov 1, 1861	Created as one of the 17 original counties of the Territory of Colorado.	Named for its extralegal predecessor county, Jefferson County, Jefferson Territory, which in turn was named in honor of Thomas Jefferson (1743–1826), the author of the Declaration of Independence and the third President of the United States.	580,451	772.85 sq mi (2,002 km^{2})	State map highlighting Jefferson County
Kiowa County	061	Eads	Apr 11, 1889	Split from Bent County.	Named for the Kiowa Nation of Native Americans.	1,412	1,785.90 sq mi (4,625 km^{2})	State map highlighting Kiowa County
Kit Carson County	063	Burlington	Apr 11, 1889	Split from Elbert County.	Named in honor of Christopher Houston "Kit" Carson (1809-1868), the famous frontier scout and soldier.	7,069	2,162.43 sq mi (5,601 km^{2})	State map highlighting Kit Carson County
La Plata County	067	Durango	Feb 10, 1874	Split from Lake and Conejos counties.	Named for the many silver deposits in the area. La plata is a Spanish expression for the silver.	56,898	1,700.44 sq mi (4,404 km^{2})	State map highlighting La Plata County
Lake County	065	Leadville	Nov 1, 1861	Created as one of the 17 original counties of the Territory of Colorado. Renamed Carbonate County for the two days from February 8–10, 1879.	Named for the Twin Lakes in the county.	7,552	383.55 sq mi (993 km^{2})	State map highlighting Lake County
Larimer County	069	Fort Collins	Nov 1, 1861	Created as one of the 17 original counties of the Territory of Colorado.	Named in honor of William Larimer (1809–1875), a pioneer entrepreneur.	377,292	2,631.75 sq mi (6,816 km^{2})	State map highlighting Larimer County
Las Animas County	071	Trinidad	Feb 9, 1866	Split from Huerfano County.	Named for the Purgatoire River, which was originally named el Rio de las Animas Perdidas, which is Spanish for the River of the Souls in Purgatory.	14,391	4,773.27 sq mi (12,363 km^{2})	State map highlighting Las Animas County
Lincoln County	073	Hugo	Apr 11, 1889	Split from Elbert and Bent counties.	Named in honor of Abraham Lincoln (1809–1865), the sixteenth President of the United States.	5,645	2,585.21 sq mi (6,696 km^{2})	State map highlighting Lincoln County
Logan County	075	Sterling	Feb 25, 1887	Split from Weld County.	Named in honor of John Alexander Logan (1826–1886), a U.S. Army general and U.S. Senator from Illinois.	20,654	1,845.31 sq mi (4,779 km^{2})	State map highlighting Logan County
Mesa County	077	Grand Junction	Feb 14, 1883	Split from Gunnison County.	Named for the mesa formations which are widespread through the area.	162,845	3,345.69 sq mi (8,665 km^{2})	State map highlighting Mesa County
Mineral County	079	Creede	Mar 27, 1893	Split from Hinsdale, Rio Grande, and Saguache counties.	Named from the plentiful mineral deposits found in the area.	910	878.16 sq mi (2,274 km^{2})	State map highlighting Mineral County
Moffat County	081	Craig	Feb 27, 1911	Split from Routt County.	Named in honor of railroad pioneer David H. Moffat (1839–1911).	13,122	4,755.86 sq mi (12,318 km^{2})	State map highlighting Moffat County
Montezuma County	083	Cortez	Apr 16, 1889	Split from La Plata County.	Named in honor of Aztec leader Moctezuma II. Ruins in the area were once thought to be Aztec.	26,678	2,035.80 sq mi (5,273 km^{2})	State map highlighting Montezuma County
Montrose County	085	Montrose	Feb 11, 1883	Split from Gunnison County.	Named for the town of Montrose, which in turn was probably named from the novel A Legend of Montrose, published in 1819 by Walter Scott.	44,591	2,246.43 sq mi (5,818 km^{2})	State map highlighting Montrose County
Morgan County	087	Fort Morgan	Feb 19, 1889	Split from Weld County.	Named for old Fort Morgan, which in turn was named in honor of U.S. Army Colonel Christopher A. Morgan (d.1866).	30,306	1,293.83 sq mi (3,351 km^{2})	State map highlighting Morgan County
Otero County	089	La Junta	Mar 25, 1889	Split from Bent County.	Named in honor of Miguel A. Otero (1829-1882) of the prominent Otero family of the Southwest.	17,683	1,267.66 sq mi (3,283 km^{2})	State map highlighting Otero County
Ouray County	091	Ouray	Jan 18, 1877	Split from Hinsdale and Lake counties. Renamed Uncompaghre County for four days from 1883-02-27, to 1883-03-02.	Named in honor of Ouray (1833-1880), a Ute Native American leader.	5,265	542.30 sq mi (1,405 km^{2})	State map highlighting Ouray County
Park County	093	Fairplay	Nov 1, 1861	Created as one of the 17 original counties of the Territory of Colorado.	Named for South Park which occupies most of the county.	18,314	2,209.36 sq mi (5,722 km^{2})	State map highlighting Park County
Phillips County	095	Holyoke	Mar 27, 1889	Split from Logan County.	Named in honor of Rolla Oliver Phillips (1841-1899), secretary of the Lincoln Land Company, which sold farmsteads in the area.	4,420	688.30 sq mi (1,783 km^{2})	State map highlighting Phillips County
Pitkin County	097	Aspen	Feb 23, 1881	Split from Gunnison County.	Named in honor of Frederick Walker Pitkin (1837-1886), the second Governor of the State of Colorado.	16,625	970.37 sq mi (2,513 km^{2})	State map highlighting Pitkin County
Prowers County	099	Lamar	Apr 11, 1889	Split from Bent County.	Named in honor of John W. Prowers (1839-1884), a pioneer of the Arkansas River valley.	11,884	1,645.37 sq mi (4,261 km^{2})	State map highlighting Prowers County
Pueblo County	101	Pueblo	Nov 1, 1861	Created as one of the 17 original counties of the Territory of Colorado.	Named for historic town of Pueblo. Pueblo is a Spanish word meaning village or people.	169,277	2,396.77 sq mi (6,208 km^{2})	State map highlighting Pueblo County
Rio Blanco County	103	Meeker	Mar 25, 1889	Split from Garfield County.	Named for the White River, which was originally named Rio Blanco in Spanish.	6,683	3,226.24 sq mi (8,356 km^{2})	State map highlighting Rio Blanco County
Rio Grande County	105	Del Norte	Feb 10, 1874	Split from Costilla County and Conejos County counties.	Named for the Rio Grande, which flows through the area.	11,087	913.10 sq mi (2,365 km^{2})	State map highlighting Rio Grande County
Routt County	107	Steamboat Springs	Jan 29, 1877	Split from Grand County.	Named in honor of John Long Routt (1826-1907), the first Governor of the State of Colorado.	25,329	2,362.11 sq mi (6,118 km^{2})	State map highlighting Routt County
Saguache County	109	Saguache	Dec 29, 1866	Split from Lake and Costilla counties.	Name comes from a Ute language noun meaning "sand dunes". (Note: The name "Saguache" is pronounced /səˈwætʃ/. This name comes from the Ute language noun "sawup" /səˈwʌp/ meaning "sand dunes". The Spanish language version of this name is usually spelled "Saguache", while the English language version is usually spelled "Sawatch".)	6,732	3,168.32 sq mi (8,206 km^{2})	State map highlighting Saguache County
San Juan County	111	Silverton	May 1, 1876	Split from Lake County.	Named for the San Juan River and San Juan Mountains, which in turn were named for Saint John the Evangelist.	813	388.99 sq mi (1,007 km^{2})	State map highlighting San Juan County
San Miguel County	113	Telluride	Mar 2, 1883	Split from San Juan County.	Named for the San Miguel River and San Miguel Mountains, which in turn were named for Saint Michael the Archangel.	7,753	1,290.76 sq mi (3,343 km^{2})	State map highlighting San Miguel County
Sedgwick County	115	Julesburg	Apr 9, 1889	Split from Logan County.	Named for Fort Sedgwick, which, in turn, was named for U.S. Army General John Sedgwick (1813–1864).	2,247	548.83 sq mi (1,421 km^{2})	State map highlighting Sedgwick County
Summit County	117	Breckenridge	Nov 1, 1861	Created as one of the 17 original counties of the Territory of Colorado.	Named for the many high mountain summits in the area.	31,517	618.92 sq mi (1,603 km^{2})	State map highlighting Summit County
Teller County	119	Cripple Creek	Mar 23, 1899	Split from El Paso and Fremont counties.	Named in honor of Henry Moore Teller (1830-1914), a U.S. Senator from Colorado and United States Secretary of the Interior.	24,756	558.58 sq mi (1,447 km^{2})	State map highlighting Teller County
Washington County	121	Akron	Feb 9, 1887	Split from Weld County.	Named in honor of George Washington (1732–1799), the first President of the United States.	4,732	2,522.90 sq mi (6,534 km^{2})	State map highlighting Washington County
Weld County	123	Greeley	Nov 1, 1861	Created as one of the 17 original counties of the Territory of Colorado.	Named in honor of Lewis Ledyard Weld (1833-1865), the first Secretary of the Territory of Colorado.	378,426	4,013.84 sq mi (10,396 km^{2})	State map highlighting Weld County
Yuma County	125	Wray	Mar 15, 1889	Split from Washington County.	Named for the Quechan (Yuma) Nation of Native Americans.	9,896	2,369.61 sq mi (6,137 km^{2})	State map highlighting Yuma County

== Racial / Ethnic Profile of counties in Colorado (2020 Census) ==
Racial / Ethnic Profile of counties in Colorado (2020 Census)
Following is a table of counties in Colorado by race/ethnicity. The majority racial/ethnic group is coded per the key below.

Majority minority with no dominant group
Majority White
Majority Black
Majority Hispanic
Majority Asian
Majority Native American

Racial and ethnic composition of counties in Colorado (2020 Census) (NH = Non-Hispanic) Note: the US Census treats Hispanic/Latino as an ethnic category. This table excludes Latinos from the racial categories and assigns them to a separate category. Hispanics/Latinos may be of any race.
County	Location of County	Total Population	White alone (NH)	%	Black or African American alone (NH)	%	Native American or Alaska Native alone (NH)	%	Asian alone (NH)	%	Pacific Islander alone (NH)	%	Other race alone (NH)	%	Mixed race or Multiracial (NH)	%	Hispanic or Latino (any race)	%
Adams		519,572	239,295	46.06%	16,054	3.09%	2,869	0.55%	22,583	4.35%	753	0.14%	2,369	0.46%	19,000	3.66%	216,649	41.70%
Alamosa		16,376	7,490	45.74%	211	1.29%	215	1.31%	142	0.87%	19	0.12%	104	0.64%	494	3.02%	7,701	47.03%
Arapahoe		655,070	368,047	56.18%	68,152	10.40%	2,654	0.41%	41,855	6.39%	1,634	0.25%	3,549	0.54%	33,450	5.11%	135,729	20.72%
Archuleta		13,359	10,175	76.17%	41	0.31%	170	1.27%	101	0.76%	6	0.04%	77	0.58%	630	4.72%	2,159	16.16%
Baca		3,506	2,916	83.17%	19	0.54%	38	1.08%	8	0.23%	0	0.00%	37	1.06%	142	4.05%	346	9.87%
Bent		5,650	3,315	58.67%	255	4.51%	90	1.59%	39	0.69%	0	0.00%	8	0.14%	183	3.24%	1,760	31.15%
Boulder		330,758	245,203	74.13%	3,149	0.95%	1,112	0.34%	16,291	4.93%	241	0.07%	1,820	0.55%	14,774	4.47%	48,168	14.56%
Broomfield		74,112	53,904	72.73%	927	1.25%	197	0.27%	5,096	6.88%	80	0.11%	351	0.47%	3,638	4.91%	9,919	13.38%
Chaffee		19,476	16,195	83.15%	295	1.51%	132	0.68%	133	0.68%	11	0.06%	100	0.51%	769	3.95%	1,841	9.45%
Cheyenne		1,748	1,470	84.10%	1	0.06%	5	0.29%	3	0.17%	0	0.00%	3	0.17%	60	3.43%	206	11.78%
Clear Creek		9,397	8,149	86.72%	49	0.52%	41	0.44%	82	0.87%	7	0.07%	38	0.40%	383	4.08%	648	6.90%
Conejos		7,461	3,465	46.44%	14	0.19%	44	0.59%	21	0.28%	2	0.03%	24	0.32%	112	1.50%	3,779	50.65%
Costilla		3,499	1,234	35.27%	33	0.94%	34	0.97%	55	1.57%	0	0.00%	13	0.37%	142	4.06%	1,988	56.82%
Crowley		5,922	3,438	58.05%	510	8.61%	151	2.55%	69	1.17%	2	0.03%	5	0.08%	139	2.35%	1,608	27.15%
Custer		4,704	4,212	89.54%	10	0.21%	42	0.89%	22	0.47%	0	0.00%	45	0.96%	195	4.15%	178	3.78%
Delta		31,196	24,907	79.84%	121	0.39%	121	0.39%	236	0.76%	9	0.03%	192	0.62%	1,281	4.11%	4,329	13.88%
Denver		715,522	388,764	54.33%	61,098	8.54%	3,740	0.52%	27,198	3.80%	1,395	0.19%	3,746	0.52%	30,121	4.21%	199,460	27.88%
Dolores		2,326	1,950	83.83%	18	0.77%	36	1.55%	6	0.26%	4	0.17%	5	0.21%	131	5.63%	176	7.57%
Douglas		357,978	278,770	77.87%	4,788	1.34%	970	0.27%	19,807	5.53%	290	0.08%	1,551	0.43%	17,692	4.94%	34,110	9.53%
Eagle		55,731	36,202	64.96%	296	0.53%	118	0.21%	712	1.28%	27	0.05%	187	0.34%	1,331	2.39%	16,858	30.25%
Elbert		26,062	22,185	85.12%	123	0.47%	116	0.45%	184	0.71%	21	0.08%	123	0.47%	1,243	4.77%	2,067	7.93%
El Paso		730,395	480,484	65.78%	40,759	5.58%	3,816	0.52%	21,629	2.96%	2,750	0.38%	4,599	0.63%	46,374	6.35%	129,984	17.80%
Fremont		48,939	37,713	77.06%	1,809	3.70%	691	1.41%	332	0.68%	30	0.06%	234	0.48%	2,081	4.25%	6,049	12.36%
Garfield		61,685	38,636	62.63%	277	0.45%	300	0.49%	397	0.64%	34	0.06%	309	0.50%	2,168	3.51%	19,564	31.72%
Gilpin		5,808	4,952	85.26%	32	0.55%	36	0.62%	85	1.46%	4	0.07%	37	0.64%	282	4.86%	380	6.54%
Grand		15,717	13,435	85.48%	59	0.38%	56	0.36%	83	0.53%	17	0.11%	73	0.46%	461	2.93%	1,533	9.75%
Gunnison		16,918	14,254	84.25%	77	0.46%	70	0.41%	121	0.72%	7	0.04%	111	0.66%	674	3.98%	1,604	9.48%
Hinsdale		788	693	87.94%	8	1.02%	6	0.76%	2	0.25%	1	0.13%	6	0.76%	42	5.33%	30	3.81%
Huerfano		6,820	4,231	62.04%	53	0.78%	77	1.13%	24	0.35%	0	0.00%	49	0.72%	256	3.75%	2,130	31.23%
Jackson		1,379	1,161	84.19%	0	0.00%	12	0.87%	2	0.15%	2	0.15%	5	0.36%	59	4.28%	138	10.01%
Jefferson		582,910	435,245	74.67%	6,653	1.14%	2,898	0.50%	17,694	3.04%	464	0.08%	2,816	0.48%	25,626	4.40%	91,514	15.70%
Kiowa		1,446	1,247	86.24%	3	0.21%	0	0.00%	9	0.62%	1	0.07%	1	0.07%	81	5.60%	104	7.19%
Kit Carson		7,087	5,306	74.87%	21	0.30%	24	0.34%	30	0.42%	5	0.07%	32	0.45%	260	3.67%	1,409	19.88%
Lake		7,436	4,293	57.73%	31	0.42%	46	0.62%	63	0.85%	8	0.11%	45	0.61%	288	3.87%	2,662	35.80%
La Plata		55,638	42,392	76.19%	182	0.33%	2,809	5.05%	381	0.68%	33	0.06%	377	0.68%	2,456	4.41%	7,008	12.60%
Larimer		359,066	282,581	78.70%	3,448	0.96%	1,495	0.42%	8,365	2.33%	265	0.07%	1,819	0.51%	16,431	4.58%	44,662	12.44%
Las Animas		14,555	7,965	54.72%	183	1.26%	145	1.00%	108	0.74%	12	0.08%	87	0.60%	423	2.91%	5,632	38.69%
Lincoln		5,675	4,252	74.93%	275	4.85%	61	1.07%	40	0.70%	22	0.39%	21	0.37%	195	3.44%	809	14.26%
Logan		21,528	16,337	75.89%	753	3.50%	161	0.75%	119	0.55%	17	0.08%	52	0.24%	578	2.68%	3,511	16.31%
Mesa		155,703	120,749	77.55%	1,020	0.66%	933	0.60%	1,613	1.04%	188	0.12%	889	0.57%	7,033	4.52%	23,278	14.95%
Mineral		865	775	89.60%	0	0.00%	4	0.46%	3	0.35%	0	0.00%	0	0.00%	36	4.16%	47	5.43%
Moffat		13,292	10,313	77.59%	77	0.58%	98	0.74%	52	0.39%	2	0.02%	60	0.45%	566	4.26%	2,124	15.98%
Montezuma		25,849	18,035	69.77%	72	0.28%	3,166	12.25%	128	0.50%	24	0.09%	107	0.41%	1,208	4.67%	3,109	12.03%
Montrose		42,679	31,126	72.93%	159	0.37%	262	0.61%	334	0.78%	26	0.06%	183	0.43%	1,562	3.66%	9,027	21.15%
Morgan		29,111	16,546	56.84%	935	3.21%	110	0.38%	153	0.53%	11	0.04%	77	0.26%	713	2.45%	10,566	36.30%
Otero		18,690	10,013	53.57%	134	0.72%	112	0.60%	98	0.52%	28	0.15%	103	0.55%	500	2.68%	7,702	41.21%
Ouray		4,874	4,308	88.39%	16	0.33%	16	0.33%	28	0.57%	2	0.04%	24	0.49%	188	3.86%	292	5.99%
Park		17,390	14,902	85.69%	89	0.51%	118	0.68%	99	0.57%	9	0.05%	94	0.54%	844	4.85%	1,235	7.10%
Phillips		4,530	3,246	71.66%	10	0.22%	12	0.26%	22	0.49%	1	0.02%	5	0.11%	79	1.74%	1,155	25.50%
Pitkin		17,358	14,433	83.15%	94	0.54%	36	0.21%	280	1.61%	7	0.04%	82	0.47%	534	3.08%	1,892	10.90%
Prowers		11,999	6,686	55.72%	83	0.69%	118	0.98%	31	0.26%	6	0.05%	50	0.42%	345	2.88%	4,680	39.00%
Pueblo		168,162	85,527	50.86%	2,995	1.78%	1,246	0.74%	1,562	0.93%	138	0.08%	944	0.56%	5,829	3.47%	69,921	41.58%
Rio Blanco		6,529	5,509	84.38%	29	0.44%	51	0.78%	22	0.34%	2	0.03%	29	0.44%	265	4.06%	622	9.53%
Rio Grande		11,539	6,261	54.26%	51	0.44%	137	1.19%	36	0.31%	4	0.03%	56	0.49%	385	3.34%	4,609	39.94%
Routt		24,829	21,242	85.55%	153	0.62%	67	0.27%	169	0.68%	35	0.14%	92	0.37%	871	3.51%	2,200	8.86%
Saguache		6,368	3,578	56.19%	19	0.30%	81	1.27%	63	0.99%	2	0.03%	42	0.66%	189	2.97%	2,394	37.59%
San Juan		705	575	81.56%	1	0.14%	6	0.85%	2	0.28%	0	0.00%	1	0.14%	30	4.26%	90	12.77%
San Miguel		8,072	6,757	83.71%	20	0.25%	47	0.58%	55	0.68%	0	0.00%	44	0.55%	267	3.31%	882	10.93%
Sedgwick		2,404	1,934	80.45%	3	0.12%	10	0.42%	12	0.50%	0	0.00%	8	0.33%	74	3.08%	363	15.10%
Summit		31,055	23,782	76.58%	232	0.75%	67	0.22%	407	1.31%	20	0.06%	150	0.48%	1,062	3.42%	5,335	17.18%
Teller		24,710	21,017	85.05%	132	0.53%	122	0.49%	201	0.81%	12	0.05%	148	0.60%	1,362	5.51%	1,716	6.94%
Washington		4,817	4,057	84.22%	24	0.50%	8	0.17%	15	0.31%	10	0.21%	20	0.42%	167	3.47%	516	10.71%
Weld		328,981	205,881	62.58%	4,154	1.26%	1,327	0.40%	5,682	1.73%	303	0.09%	1,305	0.40%	11,867	3.61%	98,462	29.93%
Yuma		9,988	6,948	69.56%	21	0.21%	16	0.16%	26	0.26%	2	0.02%	27	0.27%	177	1.77%	2,771	27.74%

== County population ==
The 64 counties of the State of Colorado ranked by population
County	Population								County website	Coordinates (Note: The centroid geographic coordinates of the county as determined by the United States Census Bureau.)
County	2025 rank	2025 estimates	Change	2020 Census	Change	2010 Census	Change	2000 Census	County website	Coordinates
El Paso County	1	757,040	+3.65%	730,395	+17.38%	622,263	+20.38%	516,934	El Paso County	38.8320°N 104.5254°W
City and County of Denver	2	740,613	+3.51%	715,522	+19.22%	600,158	+8.37%	553,805	City and County of Denver	39.7620°N 104.8760°W
Arapahoe County	3	673,820	+2.86%	655,070	+14.52%	572,003	+17.01%	488,829	Arapahoe County	39.6503°N 104.3393°W
Jefferson County	4	580,451	−0.42%	582,910	+9.05%	534,543	+1.73%	525,449	Jefferson County	39.5859°N 105.2506°W
Adams County	5	554,668	+6.75%	519,572	+17.66%	441,603	+26.87%	348,076	Adams County	39.8742°N 104.3378°W
Douglas County	6	399,396	+11.57%	357,978	+25.40%	285,465	+62.44%	175,732	Douglas County	39.3296°N 104.9297°W
Weld County	7	378,426	+15.03%	328,981	+30.12%	252,825	+39.86%	180,766	Weld County	40.5542°N 104.3938°W
Larimer County	8	377,292	+5.08%	359,066	+19.84%	299,630	+19.14%	251,494	Larimer County	40.6662°N 105.4607°W
Boulder County	9	328,560	−0.66%	330,758	+12.29%	294,567	+9.19%	269,784	Boulder County	40.0925°N 105.3577°W
Pueblo County	10	169,277	+0.66%	168,162	+5.72%	159,063	+12.42%	141,490	Pueblo County	38.1732°N 104.5128°W
Mesa County	11	162,845	+4.59%	155,703	+6.12%	146,723	+25.47%	116,939	Mesa County	39.0182°N 108.4677°W
City and County of Broomfield	12	79,174	+6.83%	74,112	+32.61%	55,889	+42.57%	39,202	City and County of Broomfield	39.9541°N 105.0527°W
Garfield County	13	63,474	+2.90%	61,685	+9.39%	56,389	+28.78%	43,786	Garfield County	39.6003°N 107.9052°W
La Plata County	14	56,898	+2.26%	55,638	+8.38%	51,334	+16.78%	43,957	La Plata County	37.2864°N 107.8436°W
Eagle County	15	54,291	−2.58%	55,731	+6.77%	52,197	+25.40%	41,623	Eagle County	39.6277°N 106.6951°W
Fremont County	16	50,039	+2.25%	48,939	+4.52%	46,824	+1.48%	46,140	Fremont County	38.4732°N 105.4394°W
Montrose County	17	44,591	+4.48%	42,679	+3.40%	41,276	+23.44%	33,438	Montrose County	38.4027°N 108.2702°W
Delta County	18	32,178	+3.15%	31,196	+0.79%	30,952	+11.24%	27,824	Delta County	38.8614°N 107.8632°W
Summit County	19	31,517	+1.49%	31,055	+10.93%	27,994	+18.82%	23,560	Summit County	39.6340°N 106.1160°W
Elbert County	20	30,534	+17.16%	26,062	+12.89%	23,086	+16.27%	19,855	Elbert County	39.2864°N 104.1355°W
Morgan County	21	30,306	+4.10%	29,111	+3.38%	28,159	+3.63%	27,172	Morgan County	40.2626°N 103.8098°W
Montezuma County	22	26,678	+3.21%	25,849	+1.23%	25,535	+7.19%	23,822	Montezuma County	37.3383°N 108.5970°W
Routt County	23	25,329	+2.01%	24,829	+5.61%	23,509	+19.46%	19,679	Routt County	40.4841°N 106.9908°W
Teller County	24	24,756	+0.19%	24,710	+5.82%	23,350	+13.68%	20,541	Teller County	38.8822°N 105.1617°W
Chaffee County	25	20,831	+6.96%	19,476	+9.36%	17,809	+9.59%	16,250	Chaffee County	38.7466°N 106.1938°W
Logan County	26	20,654	−4.06%	21,528	−5.20%	22,709	+10.42%	20,566	Logan County	40.7246°N 103.1101°W
Park County	27	18,314	+5.31%	17,390	+7.31%	16,206	+11.62%	14,519	Park County	39.1188°N 105.7171°W
Otero County	28	17,683	−5.39%	18,690	−0.75%	18,831	−7.29%	20,311	Otero County	37.9026°N 103.7166°W
Gunnison County	29	17,439	+3.08%	16,918	+10.40%	15,324	+9.46%	14,000	Gunnison County	38.6664°N 107.0319°W
Alamosa County	30	16,688	+1.91%	16,376	+6.03%	15,445	+3.21%	14,965	Alamosa County	37.5728°N 105.7884°W
Pitkin County	31	16,625	−4.22%	17,358	+1.22%	17,148	+15.17%	14,889	Pitkin County	39.2172°N 106.9165°W
Grand County	32	16,496	+4.96%	15,717	+5.89%	14,843	+19.38%	12,433	Grand County	40.1025°N 106.1181°W
Las Animas County	33	14,391	−1.13%	14,555	−6.14%	15,507	+1.94%	15,212	Las Animas County	37.3166°N 104.0391°W
Archuleta County	34	14,306	+7.09%	13,359	+10.55%	12,084	+22.13%	9,894	Archuleta County	37.1937°N 107.0481°W
Moffat County	35	13,122	−1.28%	13,292	−3.65%	13,795	+4.68%	13,178	Moffat County	40.6187°N 108.2075°W
Prowers County	36	11,884	−0.96%	11,999	−4.40%	12,551	−13.34%	14,483	Prowers County	37.9549°N 102.3934°W
Rio Grande County	37	11,087	−3.92%	11,539	−3.70%	11,982	−3.57%	12,425	Rio Grande County	37.5825°N 106.3832°W
Yuma County	38	9,896	−0.92%	9,988	−0.55%	10,043	+2.00%	9,846	Yuma County	40.0022°N 102.4243°W
Clear Creek County	39	8,994	−4.29%	9,397	+3.40%	9,088	−1.89%	9,263	Clear Creek County	39.6891°N 105.6443°W
San Miguel County	40	7,753	−3.95%	8,072	+9.69%	7,359	+11.62%	6,593	San Miguel County	38.0042°N 108.4057°W
Lake County	41	7,552	+1.56%	7,436	+1.72%	7,310	−6.45%	7,814	Lake County	39.2023°N 106.3449°W
Conejos County	42	7,529	+0.91%	7,461	−9.63%	8,256	−1.71%	8,400	Conejos County	37.2008°N 106.1915°W
Kit Carson County	43	7,069	−0.25%	7,087	−14.30%	8,270	+3.21%	8,013	Kit Carson County	39.3056°N 102.6029°W
Huerfano County	44	7,011	+2.80%	6,820	+1.62%	6,711	−14.61%	7,859	Huerfano County	37.6847°N 104.9605°W
Saguache County	45	6,732	+5.72%	6,368	+4.26%	6,108	+3.46%	5,904	Saguache County	38.0807°N 106.2809°W
Rio Blanco County	46	6,683	+2.36%	6,529	−2.06%	6,666	+11.25%	5,992	Rio Blanco County	39.9807°N 108.2179°W
Gilpin County	47	6,073	+4.56%	5,808	+6.75%	5,441	+14.64%	4,746	Gilpin County	39.8575°N 105.5226°W
Bent County	48	5,716	+1.17%	5,650	−13.06%	6,499	+8.39%	5,996	Bent County	37.9548°N 103.0717°W
Crowley County	49	5,677	−4.14%	5,922	+1.70%	5,823	+5.60%	5,514	Crowley County	38.3266°N 103.7848°W
Lincoln County	50	5,645	−0.53%	5,675	+3.80%	5,467	−10.22%	6,089	Lincoln County	38.9870°N 103.5146°W
Custer County	51	5,590	+18.84%	4,704	+10.55%	4,255	+21.29%	3,508	Custer County	38.1087°N 105.3674°W
Ouray County	52	5,265	+8.02%	4,874	+9.87%	4,436	+18.39%	3,747	Ouray County	38.1554°N 107.7691°W
Washington County	53	4,732	−1.76%	4,817	+0.06%	4,814	−2.19%	4,922	Washington County	39.9704°N 103.2016°W
Phillips County	54	4,420	−2.43%	4,530	+1.98%	4,442	−0.96%	4,485	Phillips County	40.5939°N 102.3576°W
Costilla County	55	3,679	+5.14%	3,499	−0.71%	3,524	−3.74%	3,661	Costilla County	37.2777°N 105.4284°W
Baca County	56	3,347	−4.54%	3,506	−7.44%	3,788	−16.14%	4,517	Baca County	37.3191°N 102.5605°W
Dolores County	57	2,466	+6.02%	2,326	+12.69%	2,064	+11.93%	1,844	Dolores County	37.7520°N 108.5173°W
Sedgwick County	58	2,247	−6.53%	2,404	+1.05%	2,379	−13.40%	2,747	Sedgwick County	40.8760°N 102.3518°W
Cheyenne County	59	1,713	−2.00%	1,748	−4.79%	1,836	−17.63%	2,229	Cheyenne County	38.8282°N 102.6034°W
Kiowa County	60	1,412	−2.35%	1,446	+3.43%	1,398	−13.81%	1,622	Kiowa County	38.4333°N 102.7405°W
Jackson County	61	1,211	−12.18%	1,379	−1.08%	1,394	−11.60%	1,577	Jackson County	40.6661°N 106.3424°W
Mineral County	62	910	+5.20%	865	+21.49%	712	−14.32%	831	Mineral County	37.6687°N 106.9241°W
San Juan County	63	813	+15.32%	705	+0.86%	699	+25.27%	558	San Juan County	37.7640°N 107.6762°W
Hinsdale County	64	753	−4.44%	788	−6.52%	843	+6.44%	792	Hinsdale County	37.8208°N 107.3004°W
State of Colorado	State	6,012,561	+4.14%	5,773,714	+14.80%	5,029,196	+16.92%	4,301,262	State of Colorado	38.9972°N 105.5478°W

== Former counties ==
The following sortable table lists all the historic counties of the Territory of New Mexico, the Territory of Utah, the Territory of Kansas, and the extralegal Territory of Jefferson that previously existed within the boundaries of the present State of Colorado, as well as the three defunct counties of the Territory of Colorado and the three defunct counties of the State of Colorado. (Note: No organized counties of the District of Louisiana, the Territory of Missouri, the extralegal State of Deseret, or the Territory of Nebraska existed within the present boundaries of the State of Colorado.)

Counties formerly within the area of the State of Colorado
County	Territory or State	Date created	Date superseded	History
Taos County	Territory of New Mexico	Jan 09, 1852	Feb 28, 1861	Originally one of the seven partidos of the Spanish, and later Mexican, province of Santa Fe de Nuevo México. One of the nine original counties created by the Territory of New Mexico in 1852. Excluded from the new Territory of Colorado in 1861.
Great Salt Lake County	Territory of Utah	Mar 03, 1852	Feb 28, 1861	Created in 1852. Excluded from the new Territory of Colorado in 1861.
Green River County	Territory of Utah	Mar 03, 1852	Feb 28, 1861	Created in 1852, but never organized. Dissolved in 1857, but recreated in 1859. Excluded from the new Territory of Colorado in 1861, and the Territory of Wyoming in 1868. Finally dissolved in 1872.
Iron County	Territory of Utah	Mar 03, 1852	Feb 28, 1861	Created in 1852. Excluded from the new Territory of Colorado in 1861.
Sanpete County	Territory of Utah	Mar 03, 1852	Feb 28, 1861	Created in 1852. Excluded from the new Territory of Colorado in 1861.
Utah County	Territory of Utah	Mar 03, 1852	Feb 28, 1861	Created in 1852. Excluded from the new Territory of Colorado in 1861.
Washington County	Territory of Utah	Mar 03, 1852	Feb 28, 1861	Created in 1852. Excluded from the new Territory of Colorado in 1861.
Arapahoe County	Territory of Kansas	Aug 25, 1855	Feb 28, 1861	Created in 1855, but never organized. Reverted to unorganized territory when Kansas joined the Union in 1861.
Beaver County	Territory of Utah	Jan 05, 1856	Feb 28, 1861	Split from Iron and Millard counties in 1856. Excluded from the new Territory of Colorado in 1861.
Broderick County	Territory of Kansas	Feb 07, 1859	Jan 29, 1861	Split from Arapahoe County in 1859, but never organized. Reverted to unorganized territory when Kansas joined the Union in 1861.
El Paso County	Territory of Kansas	Feb 07, 1859	Jan 29, 1861	Split from Arapahoe County in 1859, but never organized. Reverted to unorganized territory when Kansas joined the Union in 1861.
Fremont County	Territory of Kansas	Feb 07, 1859	Jan 29, 1861	Split from Arapahoe County in 1859, but never organized. Reverted to unorganized territory when Kansas joined the Union in 1861.
Montana County	Territory of Kansas	Feb 07, 1859	Jan 29, 1861	Split from Arapahoe County in 1859, but never organized. Reverted to unorganized territory when Kansas joined the Union in 1861.
Oro County	Territory of Kansas	Feb 07, 1859	Jan 29, 1861	Split from Arapahoe County in 1859, but never organized. Reverted to unorganized territory when Kansas joined the Union in 1861.
Peketon County	Territory of Kansas	Feb 07, 1859	Jan 29, 1861	Created in 1859, but never organized. Reverted to unorganized territory when Kansas joined the Union in 1861.
Arrappahoe County	Territory of Jefferson	Nov 28, 1859	Feb 28, 1861	One of the 12 counties created by the extralegal Territory of Jefferson in 1859.
Cheyenne County	Territory of Jefferson	Nov 28, 1859	Feb 28, 1861	One of the 12 counties created by the extralegal Territory of Jefferson in 1859.
El Paso County	Territory of Jefferson	Nov 28, 1859	Feb 28, 1861	One of the 12 counties created by the extralegal Territory of Jefferson in 1859.
Fountain County	Territory of Jefferson	Nov 28, 1859	Feb 28, 1861	One of the 12 counties created by the extralegal Territory of Jefferson in 1859.
Heele County	Territory of Jefferson	Nov 28, 1859	Feb 28, 1861	One of the 12 counties created by the extralegal Territory of Jefferson in 1859.
Jackson County	Territory of Jefferson	Nov 28, 1859	Feb 28, 1861	One of the 12 counties created by the extralegal Territory of Jefferson in 1859.
Jefferson County	Territory of Jefferson	Nov 28, 1859	Feb 28, 1861	One of the 12 counties created by the extralegal Territory of Jefferson in 1859.
Mountain County	Territory of Jefferson	Nov 28, 1859	Feb 28, 1861	One of the 12 counties created by the extralegal Territory of Jefferson in 1859.
North County	Territory of Jefferson	Nov 28, 1859	Feb 28, 1861	One of the 12 counties created by the extralegal Territory of Jefferson in 1859.
Park County	Territory of Jefferson	Nov 28, 1859	Feb 28, 1861	One of the 12 counties created by the extralegal Territory of Jefferson in 1859.
St. Vrain's County	Territory of Jefferson	Nov 28, 1859	Feb 28, 1861	One of the 12 counties created by the extralegal Territory of Jefferson in 1859.
Saratoga County	Territory of Jefferson	Nov 28, 1859	Feb 28, 1861	One of the 12 counties created by the extralegal Territory of Jefferson in 1859.
Mora County	Territory of New Mexico	Feb 01, 1860	Feb 28, 1861	Split from Taos County and San Miguel County in 1860. Excluded from the new Territory of Colorado in 1861.
Guadalupe County	Territory of Colorado	Nov 01, 1861	Nov 07, 1861	One of the 17 original counties created by the Territory of Colorado in 1861. The county was renamed Conejos County after only six days.
Greenwood County	Territory of Colorado	Feb 11, 1870	Feb 02, 1874	Created from expropriated Cheyenne and Arapaho tribal land and the eastern portion of Huerfano County in 1870. The county was abolished in 1874 and its territory split between Elbert County and Bent County.
Platte County	Territory of Colorado	Feb 09, 1872	Feb 09, 1874	Created from the eastern portion of Weld County in 1872. The county was abolished in 1874 after organizers failed to secure voter approval. The territory of the county was returned to Weld County.
Carbonate County	State of Colorado	Feb 08, 1879	Feb 10, 1879	Lake County was renamed Carbonate County in 1879. Only two days later, Carbonate County was split into the new Chaffee County and a recreated Lake County.
Uncompahgre County	State of Colorado	Feb 27, 1883	Mar 02, 1883	Ouray County was renamed Uncompahgre County for only four days in 1883.
South Arapahoe County	State of Colorado	Nov 15, 1902	Apr 11, 1903	One of three counties created from Arapahoe County in 1902. The name was changed back to Arapahoe County after five months.

== County high points ==
Of the 64 Colorado counties, 20 counties extend above 14,000 feet (4,267 m) elevation, 32 counties extend above 13,000 feet (3,962 m), 42 counties extend above 10,000 feet (3,048 m), and all 64 Colorado counties extend above 4,116 feet (1,255 m).

== County mean elevation ==
Of Colorado's 64 counties, 4 counties have a mean elevation (Note: The "mean of extremes" elevation is the arithmetic mean of the highest and lowest elevations.) above 11,000 feet (3,353 m) elevation, 22 counties have a mean elevation above 10,000 feet (3,048 m), 32 counties have a mean elevation above 9,000 feet (2,743 m), and all 64 counties have a mean elevation above 3,880 feet (1,183 m).

The following 13 Colorado counties have highest mean elevation of any county in the United States, exceeding even the Denali Borough of Alaska.

The 13 highest mean elevation counties in the United States
Rank (Note: Rank among United States counties and county-equivalents by mean elevation.)	County	Mean elevation	High point	Highest elevation	Low point	Lowest elevation	Elevation range (Note: The elevation range is the arithmetic difference between the highest and lowest elevations.)
1	Lake County	11,702.5 feet 3,567 m	Mount Elbert	14,440 feet 4,401 m	Arkansas River (Note: The point where the Arkansas River flows out of Lake County and into Chaffee County, Colorado, is the highest county low point in the United States at 8,965 feet (2,733 m) elevation.)	8,965 feet 2,733 m	5,475 feet 1,669 m
2	Hinsdale County	11,300 feet 3,444 m	Uncompahgre Peak	14,315 feet 4,363 m	Lake Fork Gunnison River	8,285 feet 2,525 m	6,030 feet 1,838 m
3	Mineral County	11,116 feet 3,388 m	Phoenix Peak	13,902 feet 4,237 m	Rio Grande	8,330 feet 2,539 m	5,572 feet 1,698 m
4	San Juan County	11,085 feet 3,379 m	Vermilion Peak	13,900 feet 4,237 m	Animas River	8,270 feet 2,521 m	5,630 feet 1,716 m
5	Summit County	10,935.5 feet 3,333 m	Grays Peak	14,276 feet 4,351 m	Blue River	7,595 feet 2,315 m	6,681 feet 2,036 m
6	Alamosa County	10,928.5 feet 3,331 m	Blanca Peak	14,351 feet 4,374 m	Rio Grande	7,506 feet 2,288 m	6,845 feet 2,086 m
7	Saguache County	10,915 feet 3,327 m	Crestone Peak	14,300 feet 4,359 m	San Luis Creek	7,530 feet 2,295 m	6,770 feet 2,063 m
8	Costilla County	10,865.5 feet 3,312 m	Blanca Peak	14,351 feet 4,374 m	Rio Grande	7,380 feet 2,249 m	6,971 feet 2,125 m
9	Park County	10,705.5 feet 3,263 m	Mount Lincoln	14,293 feet 4,357 m	South Platte River	7,118 feet 2,170 m	7,175 feet 2,187 m
10	Chaffee County	10,661 feet 3,249 m	Mount Harvard	14,427 feet 4,397 m	Arkansas River	6,895 feet 2,102 m	7,532 feet 2,296 m
11	Clear Creek County	10,608 feet 3,233 m	Grays Peak	14,276 feet 4,351 m	Clear Creek	6,940 feet 2,115 m	7,336 feet 2,236 m
12	Rio Grande County	10,402 feet 3,171 m	Bennett Peak	13,209 feet 4,026 m	Rock Creek	7,595 feet 2,315 m	5,614 feet 1,711 m
13	Jackson County	10,353 feet 3,156 m	Clark Peak	12,956 feet 3,949 m	North Platte River	7,750 feet 2,362 m	5,206 feet 1,587 m

== County firsts ==
1. Costilla County was the first area within the present State of Colorado to be settled by Europeans in 1851.
2. Taos County, created by the Territory of New Mexico in 1852, was the first organized county to extend into the area of the present State of Colorado.
3. Arapahoe County, created by the Territory of Kansas in 1855, was the first county created exclusively within the area of the present State of Colorado.
4. On November 28, 1859, the extralegal Territory of Jefferson created 12 counties:

The 12 counties of the Territory of Jefferson
County	County Seat
Arapahoe County	Denver City
Cheyenne County	
El Paso County	Colorado City
Fountain County	Pueblo
Heele County	La Porte
Jackson County	Boulder City
Jefferson County	Arapahoe City; Golden City
Mountain County	Central City
North County	
Park County	Tarryall City
St. Vrain's County	St. Vrain
Saratoga County	Breckinridge

5. On November 1, 1861, the Territory of Colorado created the 17 original Colorado counties:

The 17 original counties of the Territory of Colorado
County	First County Seat
Arapahoe County	Denver City
Boulder County	Boulder City
Clear Creek County	Idaho
Costilla County	San Miguel (Note: San Miguel was the original seat of Costilla County. In 1863, the Costilla County seat was moved 17 miles (27 km) north to San Luis. It was not until 1869, that surveys revealed that San Miguel, now renamed Costilla, was actually located in the New Mexico Territory.)
Douglas County	Frankstown
El Paso County	Colorado City
Fremont County	Cañon City
Gilpin County	Central City
Guadaloupe County	Guadaloupe
Huerfano County	Autobees Plaza
Jefferson County	Golden City
Lake County	Oro City
Larimer County	La Porte
Park County	Tarryall City
Pueblo County	Pueblo
Summit County	Parkville
Weld County	St. Vrain

6. Of the 17 original Colorado counties created in 1861, only Gilpin County and Clear Creek County have retained their original boundaries with only minor survey changes.
7. Guadaloupe County was the first Colorado county to be renamed after only six days in 1861.
8. Las Animas County was the first new Colorado county to be created (in 1866) after the original 17 counties.
9. Greenwood County was the longest lived former Colorado county, existing four years from 1870 to 1874.
10. In 1876, San Juan County became the last county created by the Territory of Colorado, bringing the total number of territorial counties to 26.
11. In 1877, Ouray County became the first county created by the new State of Colorado.
12. Carbonate County was the shortest lived former Colorado county, existing only two days in 1879 before being dissolved.
13. The City and County of Broomfield became the newest Colorado county in 2001, bring the total number of counties to 64.

== County distinctions ==
1. El Paso County (88) and the City and County of Denver (93) and are among the 100 most populous counties of the United States.
2. San Juan County (16), Hinsdale County (25), Mineral County (32), Jackson County (55), Kiowa County (59), and Cheyenne County (80) are among the 100 least populous counties of the United States.
3. Jefferson County borders ten adjacent counties, the most of any Colorado county. (Note: Jefferson County, Colorado borders Boulder County, the City and County of Broomfield, Adams County, the City and County of Denver, Arapahoe County, Douglas County, Teller County, Park County, Clear Creek County, and Gilpin County, Colorado.)
4. Delta County and the City and County of Denver each border only three adjacent counties, the fewest of Colorado counties. (Note: Delta County, Colorado borders Gunnison County, Montrose County, and Mesa County, Colorado. The City and County of Denver, Colorado borders Adams County, Arapahoe County, and Jefferson County, Colorado.)
5. Weld County has the most incorporated municipalities of any Colorado county with 31.
6. The following nine Colorado counties have no incorporated municipalities other than their county seat:

County	County Seat
Archuleta County	Town of Pagosa Springs
Bent County	City of Las Animas
City and County of Broomfield
City and County of Denver
Hinsdale County	Town of Lake City
Jackson County	Town of Walden
Lake County	City of Leadville
Mineral County	Town of Creede
San Juan County	Town of Silverton

7. Of all 64 Colorado counties, only Conejos County has a county seat that is not an incorporated municipality.
8. The City and County of Denver and the City and County of Broomfield are the only two Colorado counties with enclaves. Arapahoe County, Boulder County, and Jefferson County are the only three Colorado counties with exclaves.
9. Pitkin and Weld are the only home rule counties.

== Gallery ==
The ten most populous Colorado counties

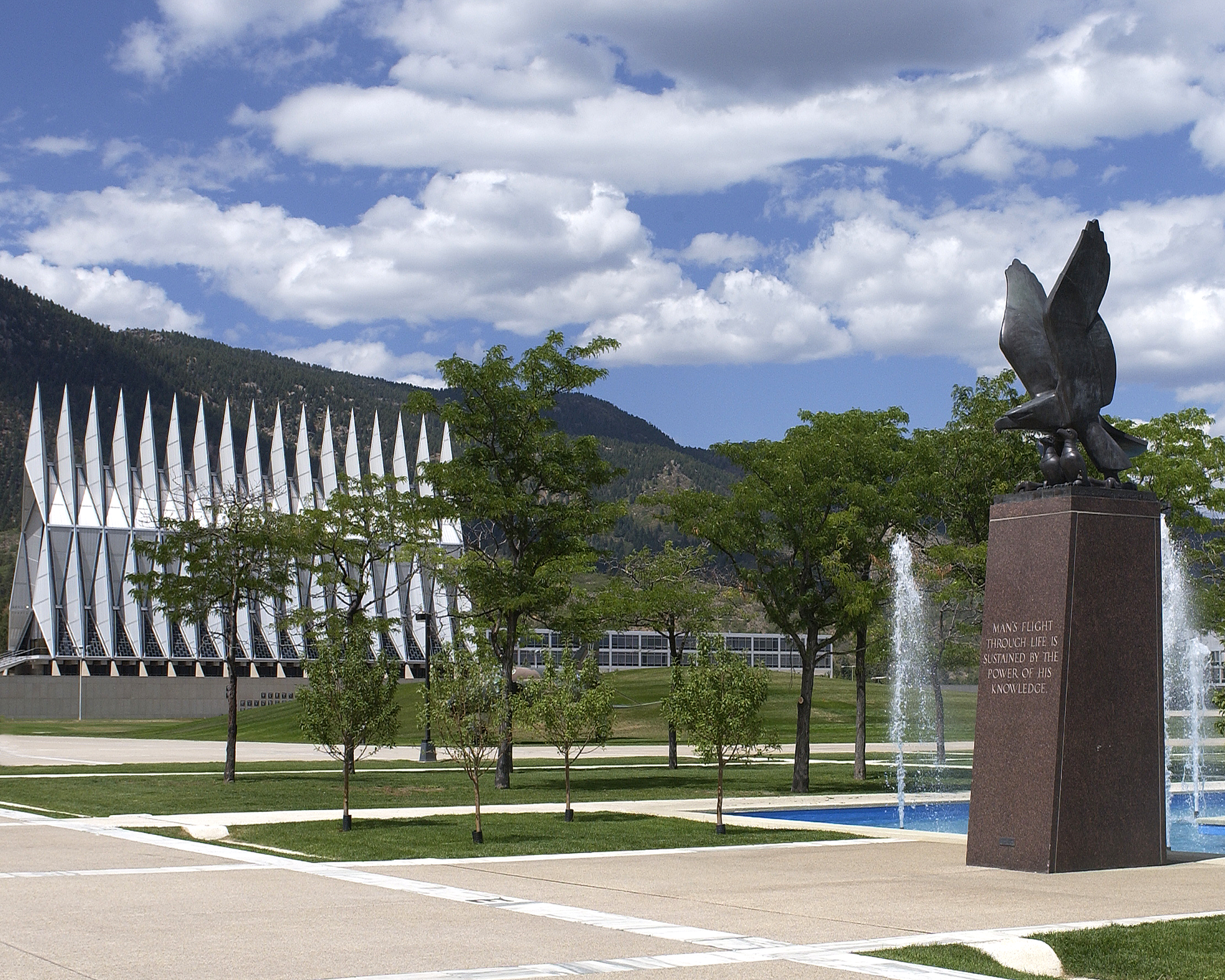
1. The United States Air Force Academy in El Paso County, Colorado

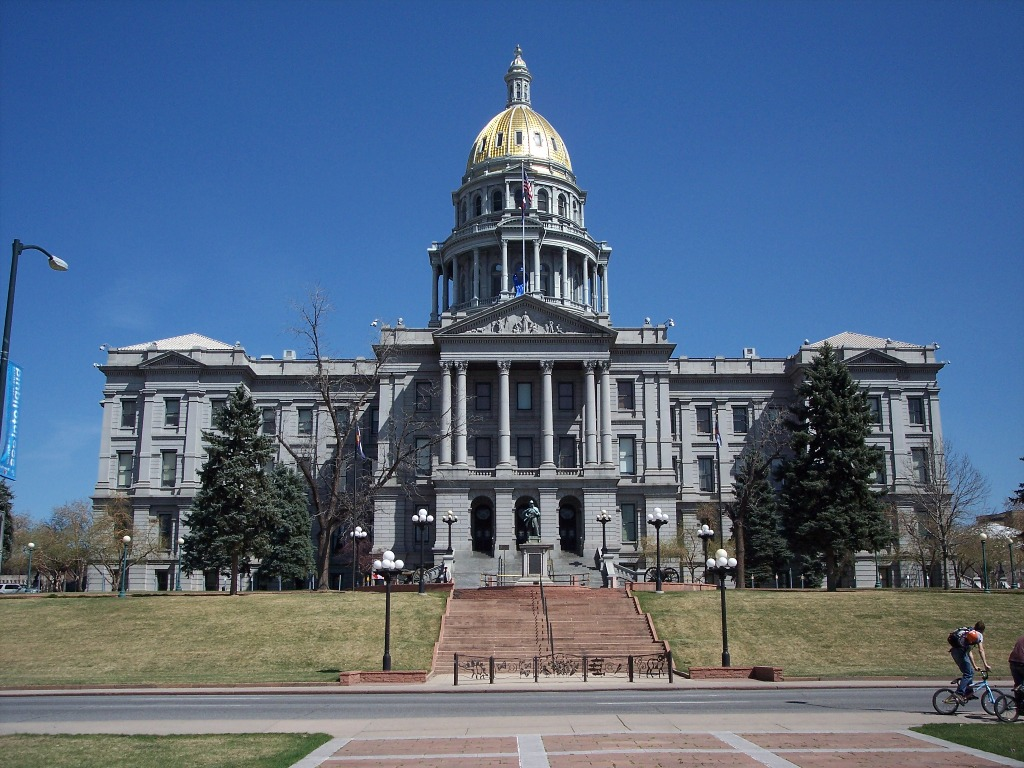
2. The Colorado State Capitol in the City and County of Denver

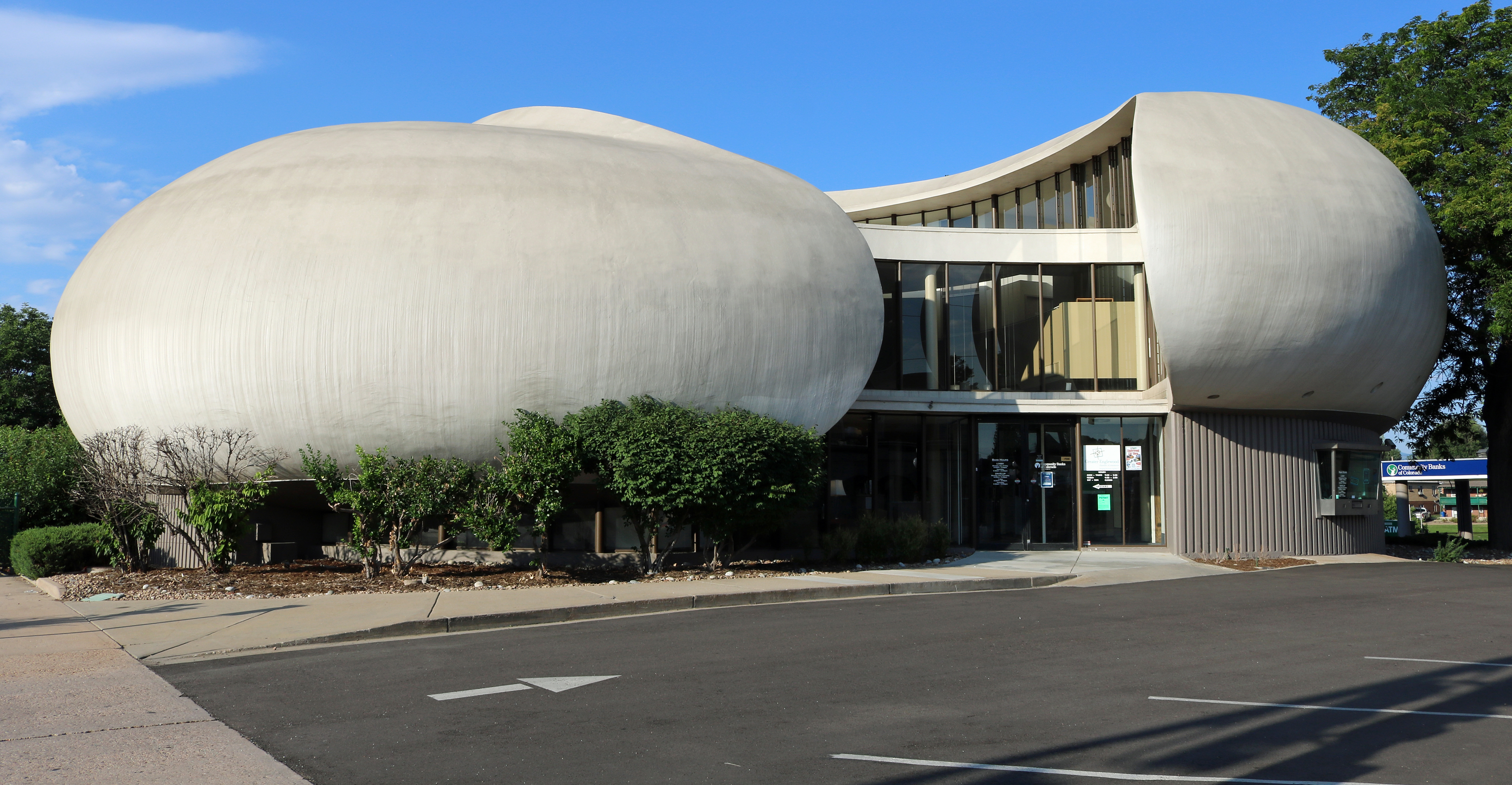
3. A bank building in Arapahoe County, Colorado

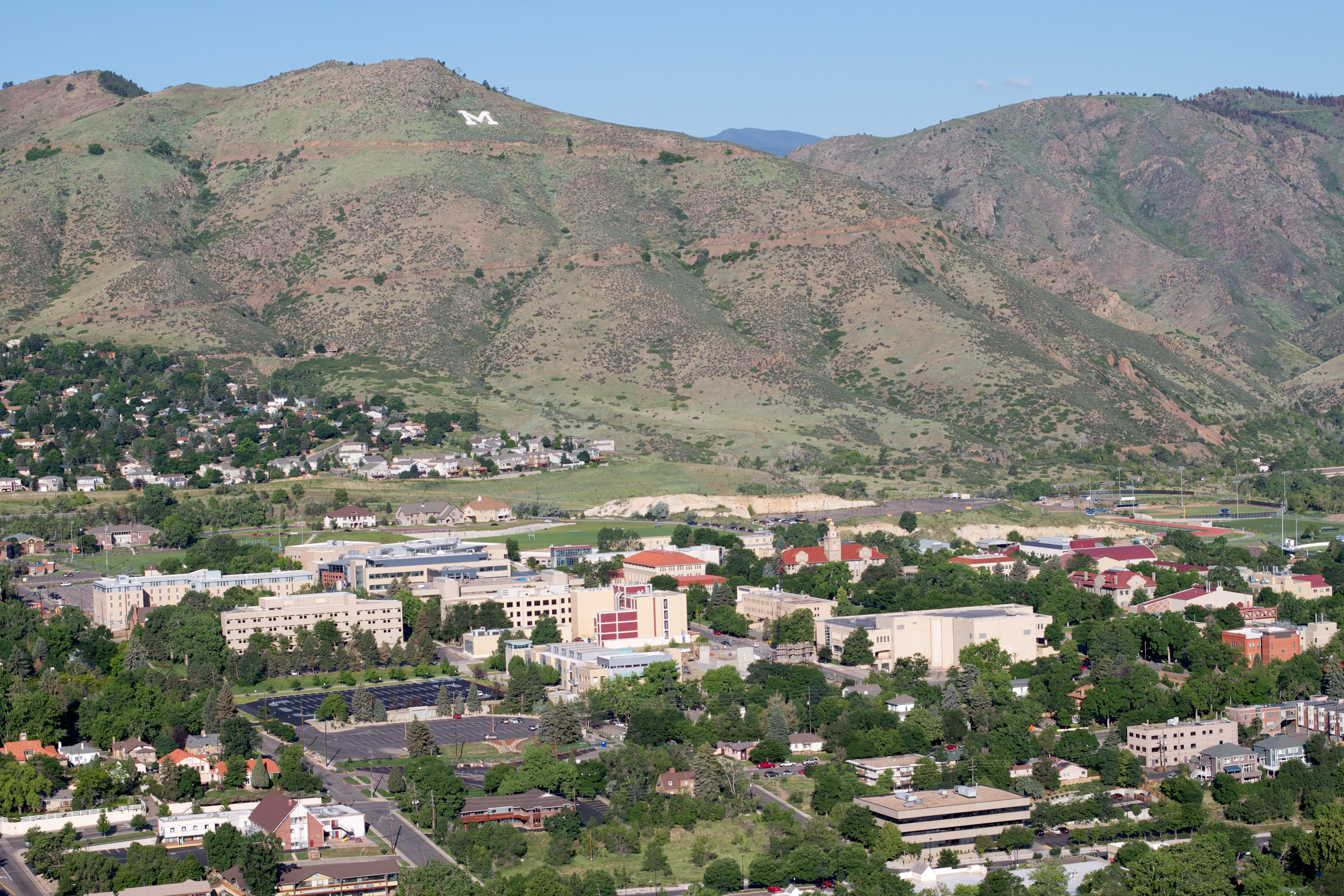
4. The Colorado School of Mines in Jefferson County, Colorado

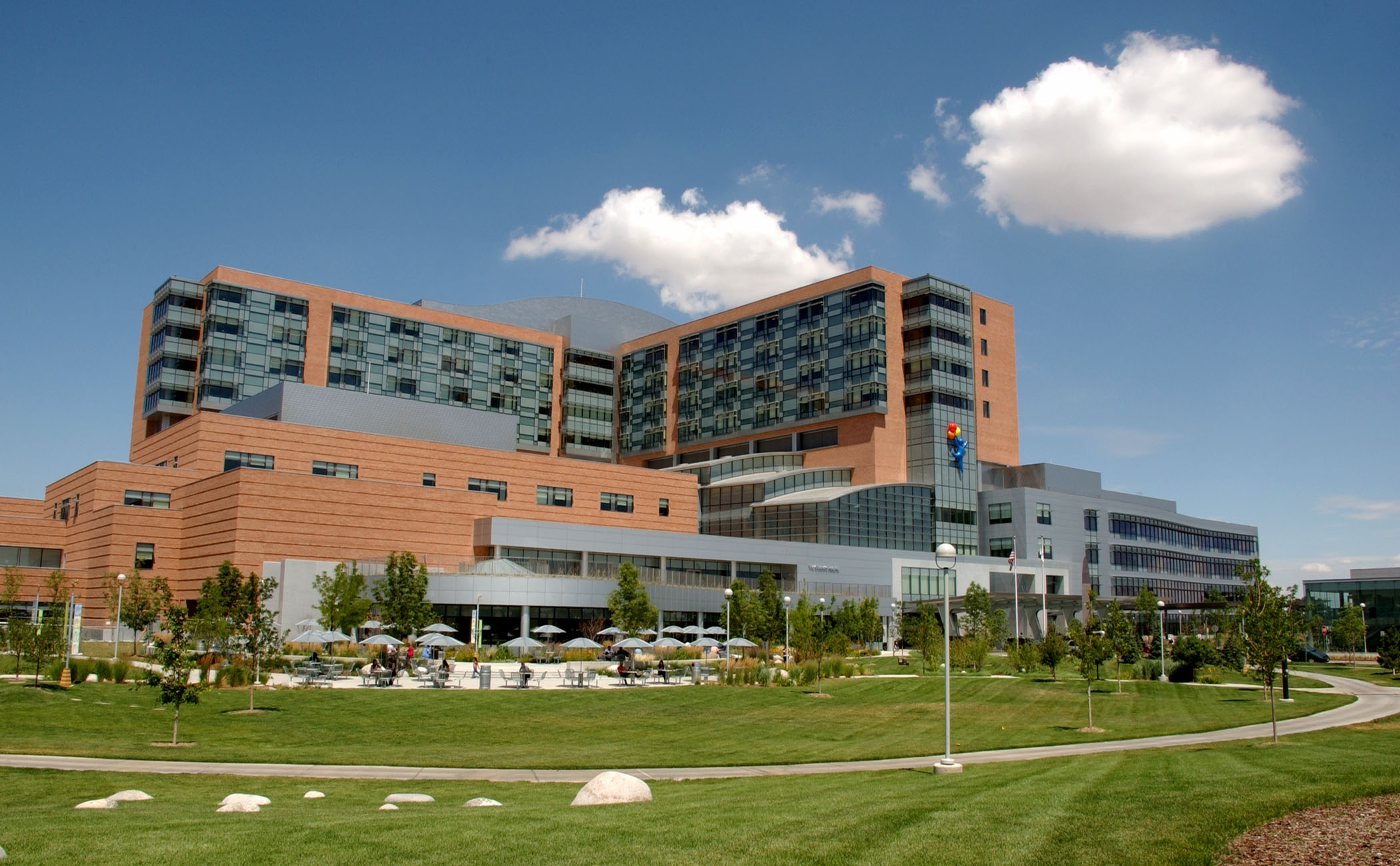
5. The Anschutz Medical Campus in Adams County, Colorado

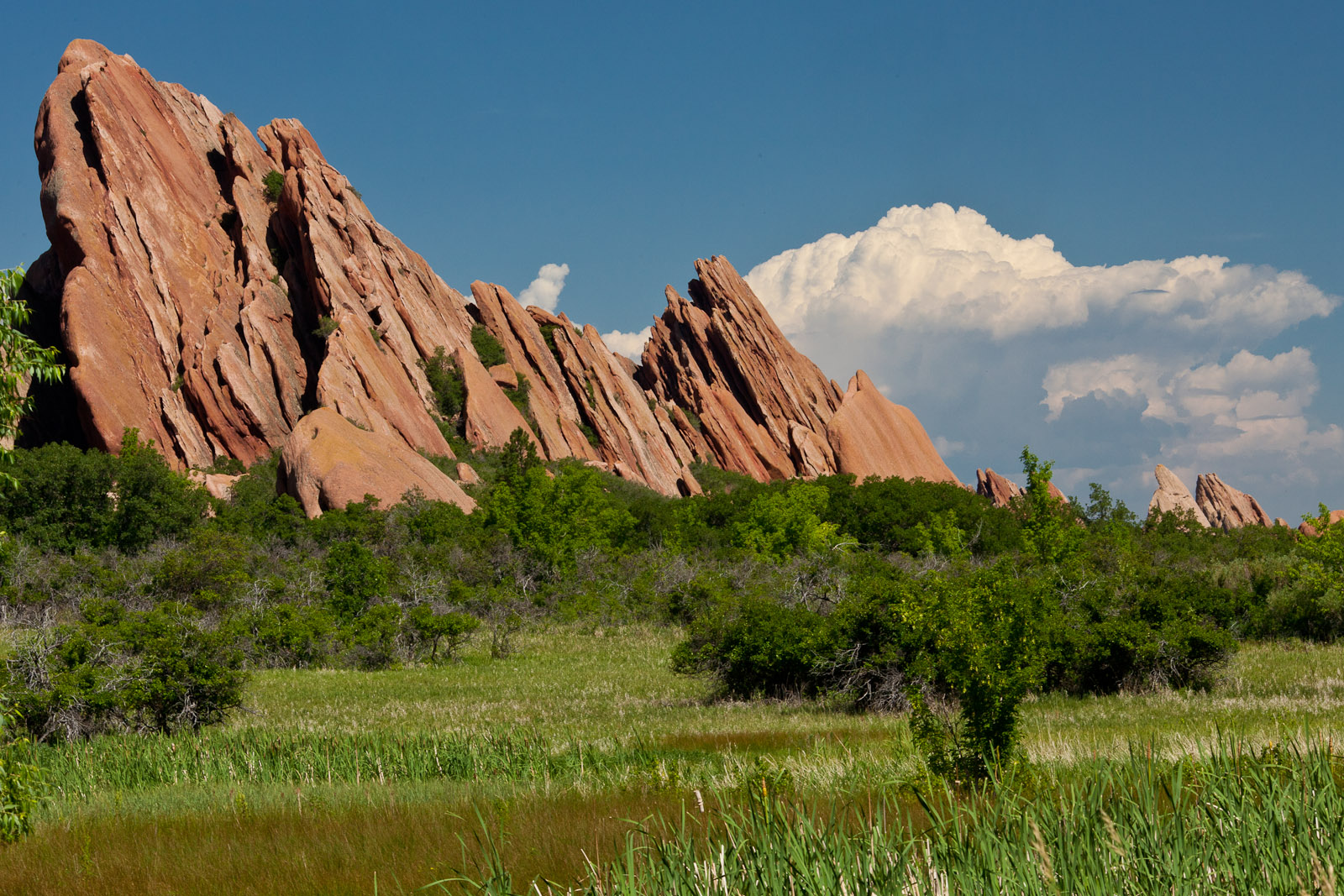
6. Roxborough State Park in Douglas County, Colorado

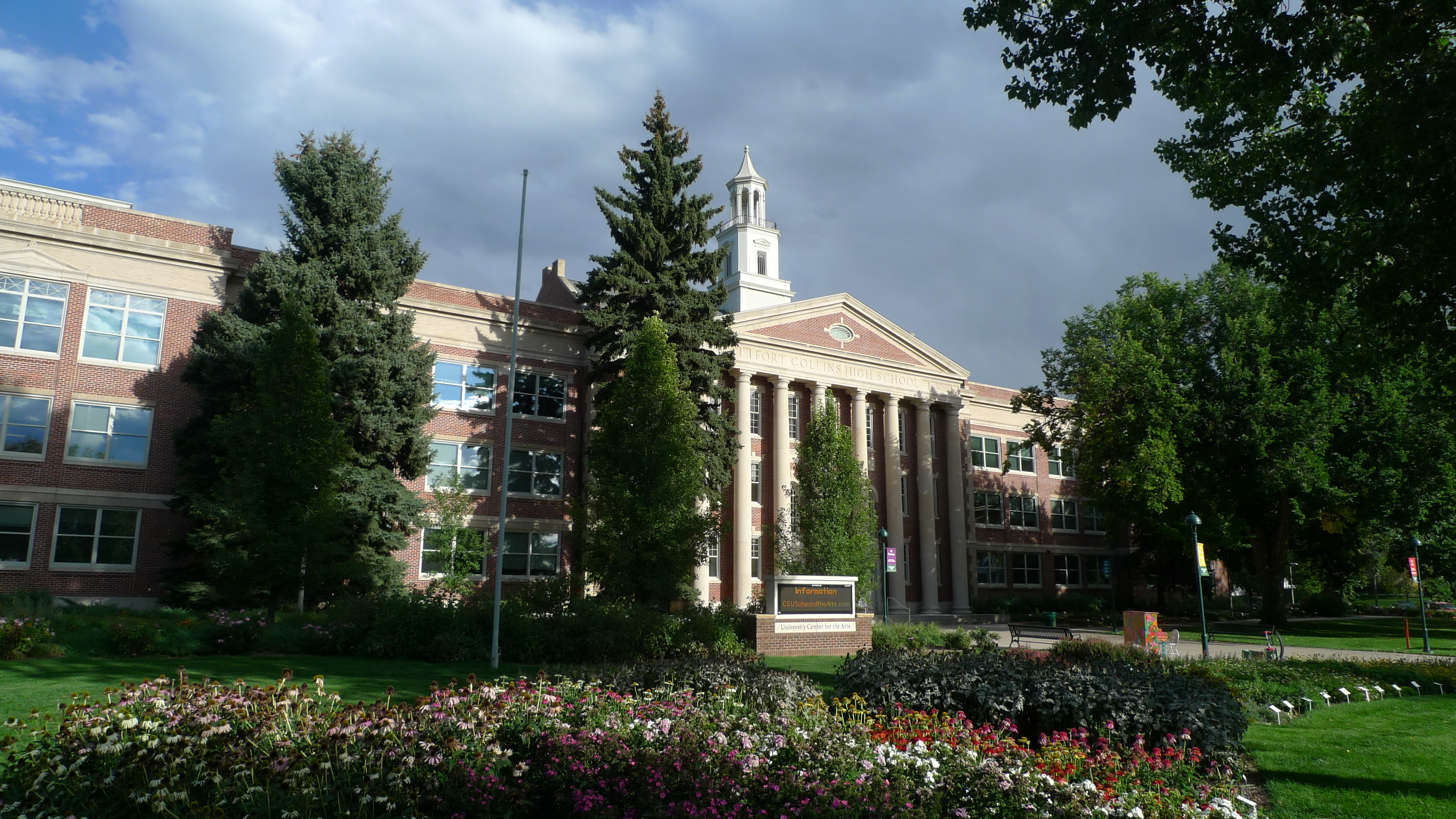
7. Colorado State University in Larimer County, Colorado

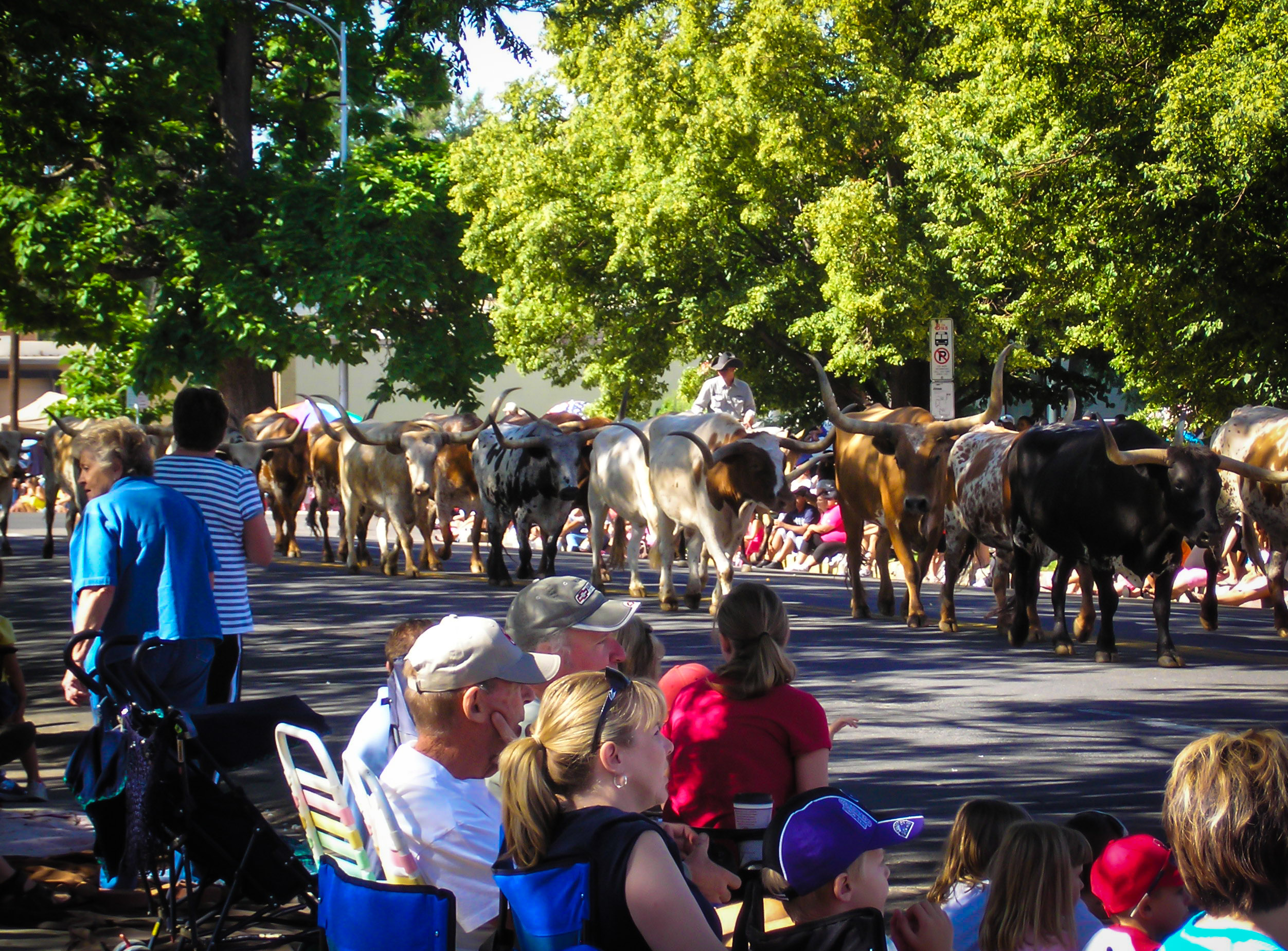
8. The Greeley Stampede Parade in Weld County, Colorado

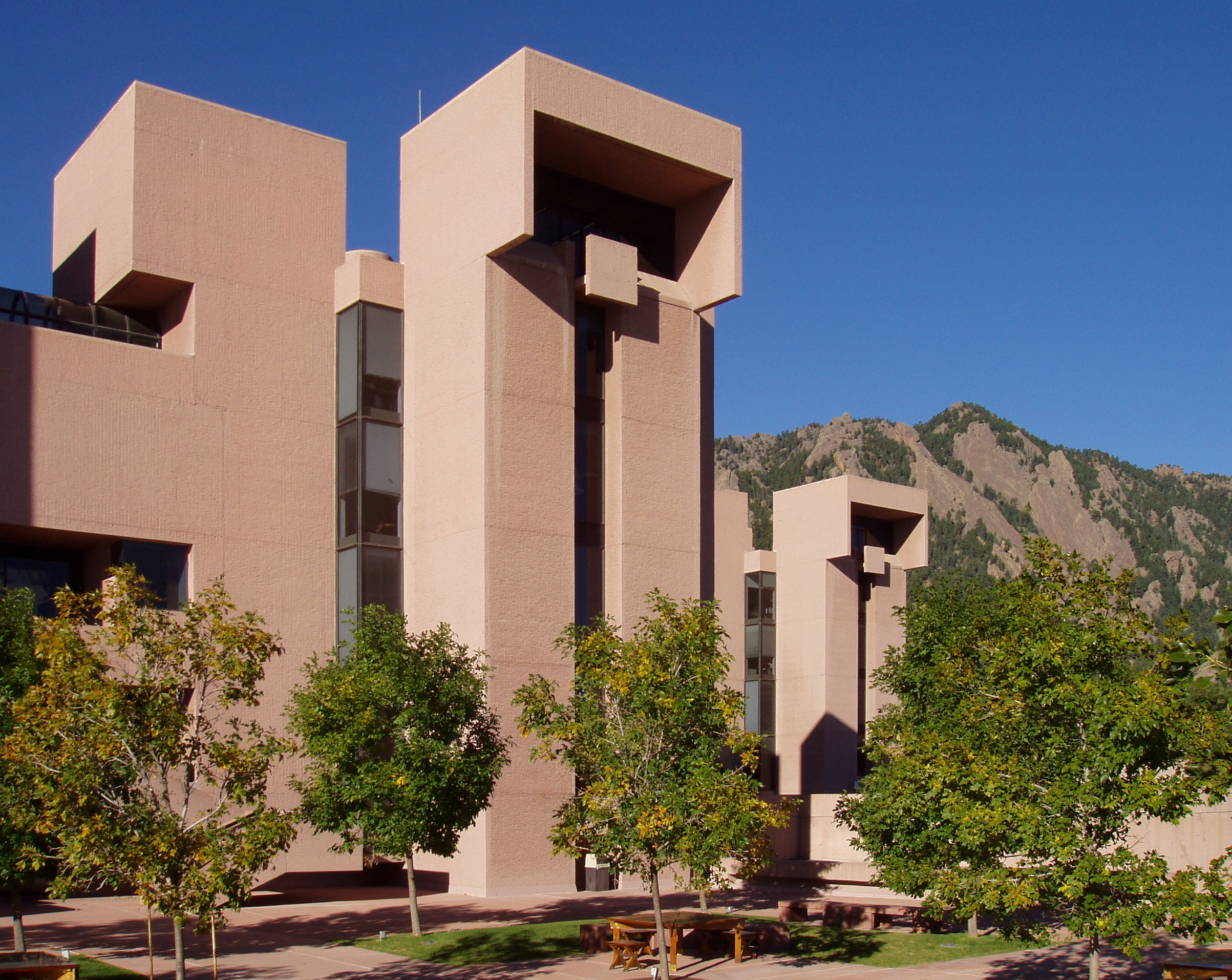
9. The National Center for Atmospheric Research in Boulder County, Colorado

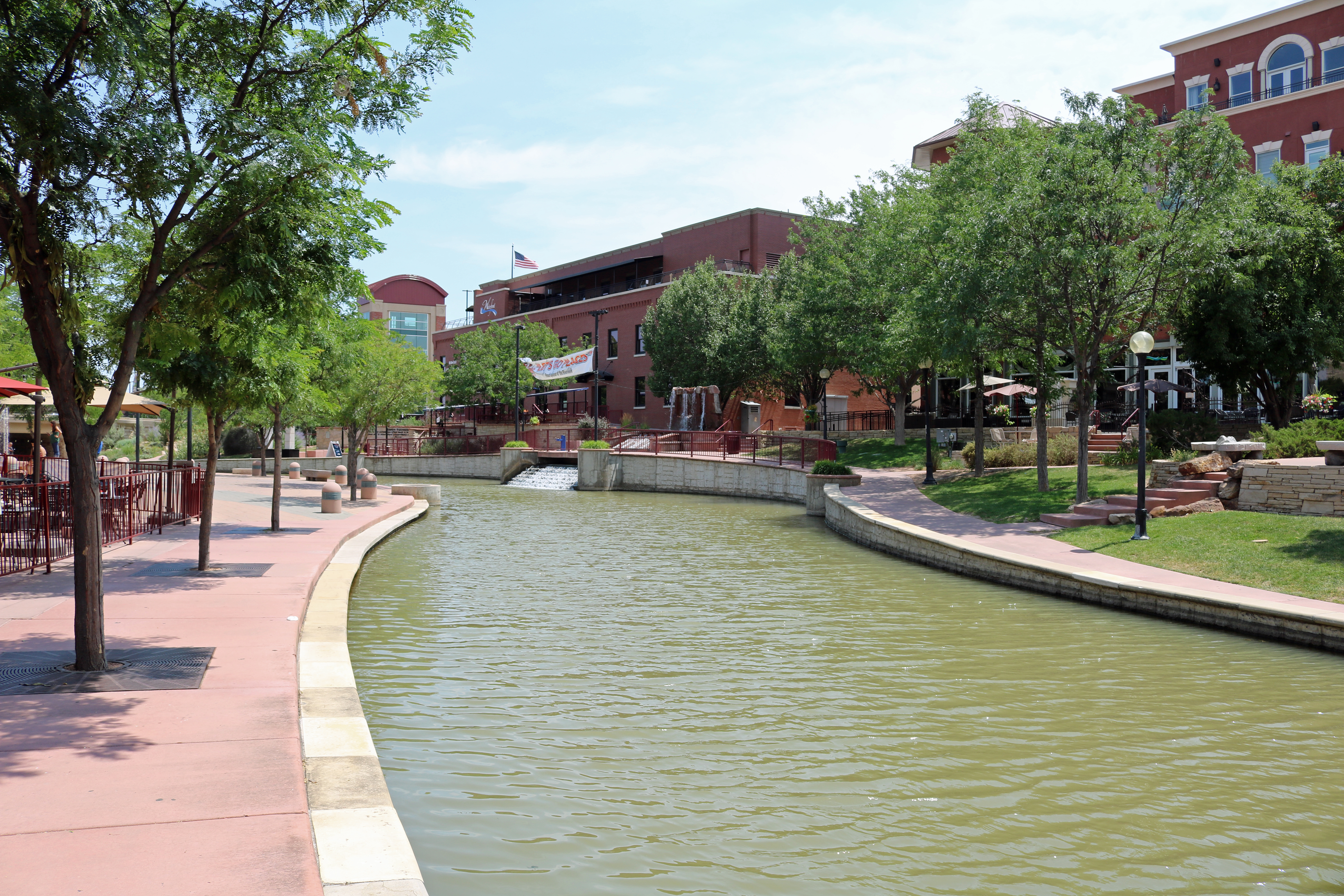
10. The Historic Arkansas Riverwalk in Pueblo County, Colorado

== See also ==
- Bibliography of Colorado
- Geography of Colorado
- History of Colorado
- Index of Colorado-related articles
- List of Colorado-related lists
  - List of Colorado counties by per capita income
  - List of Colorado counties by population
  - List of Colorado counties by socioeconomic factors
  - List of Colorado counties by statistical area
  - List of Colorado county high points
  - List of Colorado municipalities by county
  - List of Colorado populated places by county
  - List of county courthouses in Colorado
  - List of county seats in Colorado
- Outline of Colorado
