= El Paso County, Kansas Territory =

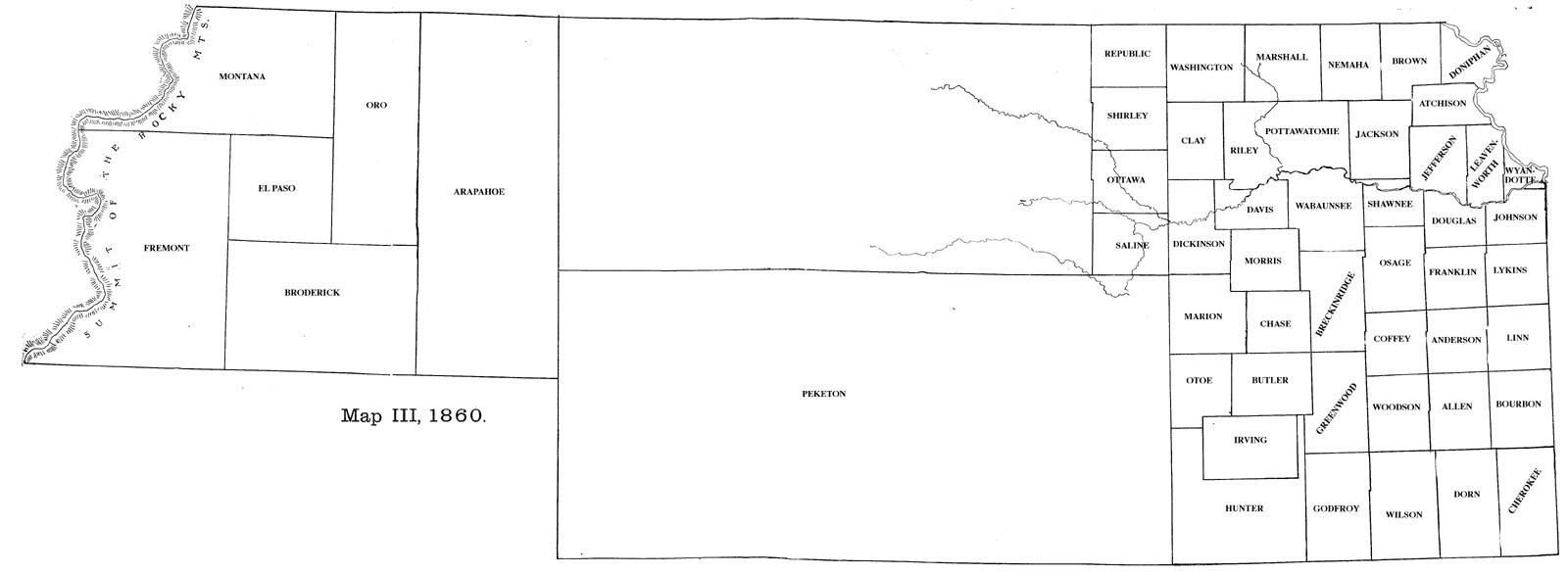
A map of Kansas Territory in 1860. El Paso County was located in the territory's western panhandle, surrounded by Fremont, Montana, Broderick, Oro Counties.

El Paso County was a county of the United States Territory of Kansas that existed for two years from February 7, 1859, to January 29, 1861.

== History ==
In July 1858, gold was discovered along the South Platte River in Arapahoe County of the Territory of Kansas (now in the State of Colorado). This discovery precipitating the Pike's Peak Gold Rush. To provide local government for the gold mining region, the Kansas Territorial Legislature split Arapahoe County into six counties on February 7, 1859: a much smaller Arapahoe County, Broderick County, El Paso County, Fremont County, Montana County, and Oro County. None of these six counties were ever organized. Many residents of the mining region felt disconnected from the territorial government, and they formed their own Territory of Jefferson on October 24, 1859.

Following the Republican Party election victories in 1860, the United States Congress admitted Kansas to the Union. The Kansas Act of Admission excluded the portion of the Kansas Territory west of the 25th meridian west from Washington from the new state, and El Paso County and the rest of this region reverted to unorganized territory.

On February 28, 1861, the Colorado Territory was organized to govern this unorganized territory and adjacent areas of the New Mexico Territory, the Utah Territory, and the Nebraska Territory. The new Colorado General Assembly organized 17 counties on November 1, 1861, including a new El Paso County for the Colorado Territory.

== See also ==
- El Paso County, Colorado
- Historic Colorado counties
- History of Colorado
- History of Kansas
- Pike's Peak Gold Rush
- Territory of Colorado
- Territory of Jefferson
- Territory of Kansas
