= Fremont County, Kansas Territory =

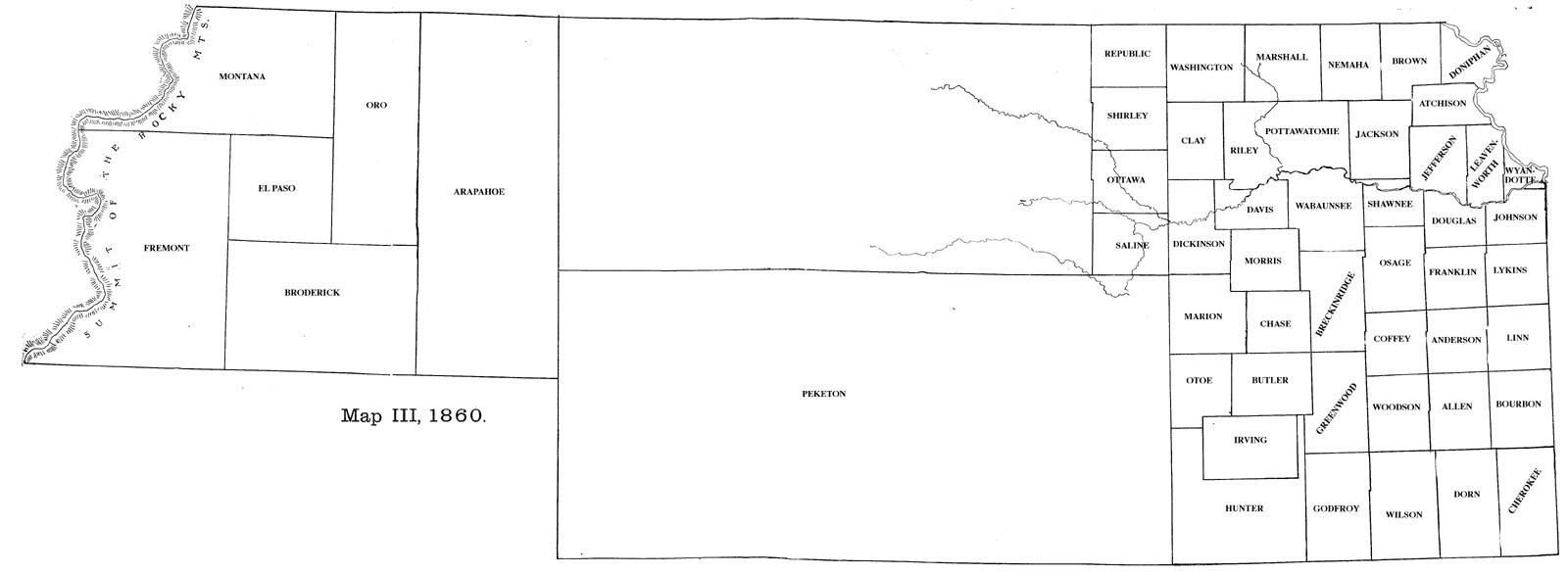
A map of Kansas Territory in 1860. Fremont County is located on the far left.

Fremont County was a county of the United States Territory of Kansas that existed for two years from February 7, 1859, to January 29, 1861.

== History ==
In July 1858, gold was discovered along the South Platte River in Arapahoe County of Kansas Territory (now in Colorado), precipitating the Pike's Peak Gold Rush. To provide local government for the gold mining region, the Territorial Legislature split Arapahoe County into six counties on February 7, 1859: a much smaller Arapahoe County, Broderick County, El Paso County, Fremont County, Montana County, and Oro County. Fremont County was named in honor of soldier, explorer, and politician John Charles Frémont. None of these six counties were ever organized. Many residents of the mining region felt disconnected from the territorial government, and they formed their own Territory of Jefferson on October 24, 1859.

Following the Republican Party election victories in 1860, the United States Congress admitted Kansas to the Union. The Kansas Act of Admission excluded the portion of the Kansas Territory west of the 25th meridian west from Washington from the new state, and Fremont County and the rest of this region reverted to unorganized territory.

On February 28, 1861, the Colorado Territory was organized to govern this unorganized territory and adjacent areas of the New Mexico, Utah, and Nebraska Territories. The new Colorado General Assembly organized 17 counties on November 1, 1861, including a new Fremont County.

== See also ==
- Fremont County, Colorado
- Historic Colorado counties
- History of Colorado
- History of Kansas
- Pike's Peak Country
- Pike's Peak Gold Rush
- Territory of Colorado
- Territory of Jefferson
- Territory of Kansas
