= Oro County, Kansas Territory =

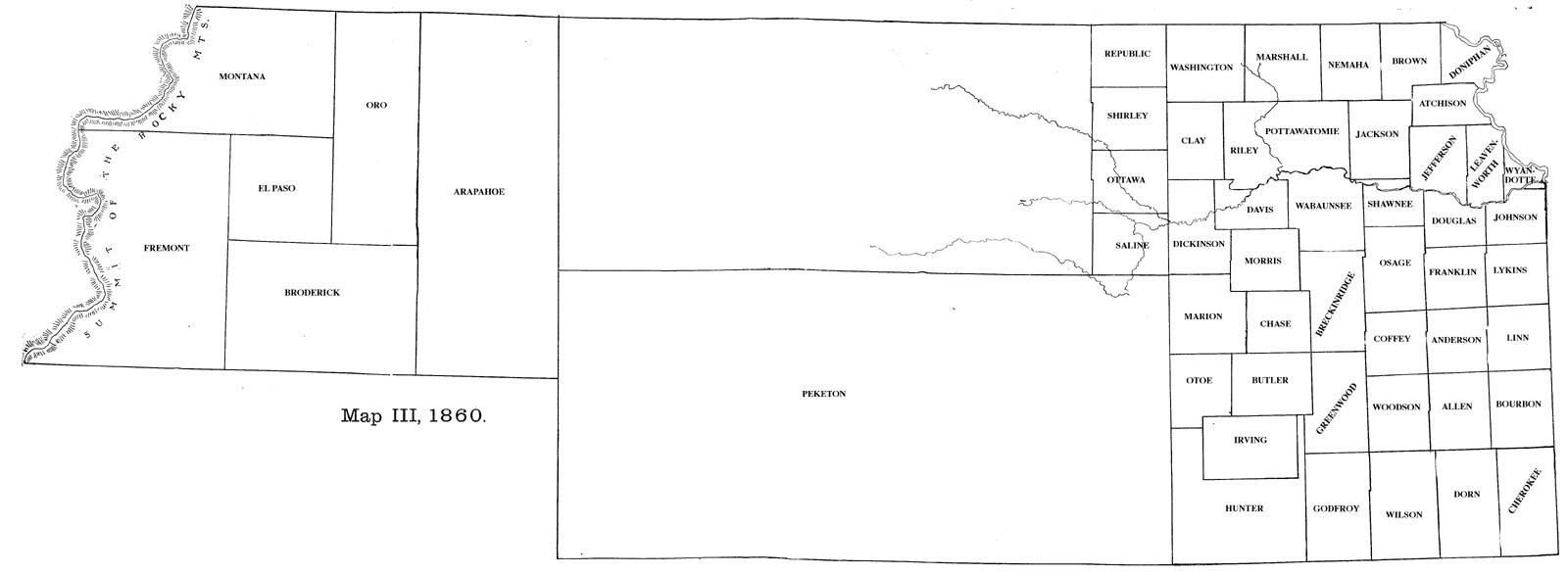
A map of Kansas Territory in 1860. Oro County is located on the left.

Oro County was a county of the United States Territory of Kansas that existed from February 7, 1859 to January 29, 1861, when Kansas joined the Union as a state.

== History ==
In July 1858, gold was discovered along the South Platte River in Arapahoe County of the Territory of Kansas (now in the State of Colorado). This discovery precipitating the Pike's Peak Gold Rush. To provide local government for the gold mining region, the Kansas Territorial Legislature split Arapahoe County into six counties on February 7, 1859: a much smaller Arapahoe County, Broderick County, El Paso County, Fremont County, Montana County, and Oro County. Oro County was named for the Spanish language name for gold, despite the fact that the county lay to the east of the gold mining region. None of these six counties were ever organized. Many residents of the mining region felt disconnected from the territorial government, and they formed their own Territory of Jefferson on October 24, 1859.

Following the Republican Party election victories in 1860, the United States Congress admitted Kansas to the Union. The Kansas Act of Admission excluded the portion of the Kansas Territory west of the 25th meridian west from Washington from the new state, and Oro County and the rest of this region reverted to unorganized territory.

On February 28, 1861, the Territory of Colorado was organized to govern this unorganized territory and adjacent areas of the Territory of New Mexico, the Territory of Utah, and the Territory of Nebraska. The new Colorado General Assembly organized 17 counties on November 1, 1861.

== See also ==
- Historic Colorado counties
- History of Colorado
- History of Kansas
- Pike's Peak Gold Rush
- Territory of Colorado
- Territory of Jefferson
- Territory of Kansas
