= List of science fiction television programs, B =

This is an inclusive list of science fiction television programs whose names begin with the letter B.

== B ==
Live-action

- Babylon 5 (franchise):
  - Babylon 5 (1993–1998)
  - Babylon 5: A Call to Arms (1999, fourth film)
  - Babylon 5: In the Beginning (1998, first film)
  - Babylon 5: The Gathering (1993, pilot)
  - Babylon 5: The Legend of the Rangers (2002, spin-off film)
  - Babylon 5: The Lost Tales (2007, anthology)
  - Babylon 5: The River of Souls (1998, third film)
  - Babylon 5: The Road Home (2023, animated)
  - Babylon 5: Thirdspace (1998, second film)
  - Crusade (1999, Babylon 5 spin-off)
- Batman (franchise):
  - Batman (1966–1968)
- Battlestar Galactica (franchise):
  - Battlestar Galactica (1978–1979)
  - Galactica 1980 (1980, Battlestar Galactica 1978 spin-off)
  - Battlestar Galactica (2004–2009)
  - Battlestar Galactica (2003, miniseries)
  - Battlestar Galactica: Razor (2007, film)
  - Battlestar Galactica: The Plan (2009, film)
  - Caprica (2010–2011, Battlestar Galactica 2004 prequel)
  - Battlestar Galactica: Blood & Chrome (2011, pilot)
- Baywatch Nights (1995–1997) (elements of science fiction in season 2 episodes)
- Beacon 23 (2023-present)
- Being Erica (2009–2011, Canada)
- Ben 10 (franchise):
  - Ben 10: Race Against Time (2007, film)
  - Ben 10: Alien Swarm (2009, film)
- Benji, Zax and the Alien Prince (1983)
- Beyond Re-Animator (2003, film)
- Beyond Reality (1991–1993) (elements of science fiction in some episodes)
- Beyond Westworld (1980)
- Big Bad Beetleborgs a.k.a. Beetleborgs Metallix (1996–1998)
- Big Pull, The (1962, UK)
- Bigfoot and Wildboy (1977)
- Bio Planet WoO (2006, Japan)
- Birds of Prey (2002–2003)
- Black Mirror (2011–present, UK, anthology)
- Black Scorpion (2001)
- Blake's 7 (1978–1981)
- Black Lightning (2018–2021)
- Blindpassasjer (1978, Norway)
- Blood Drive (2017)
- Blue Thunder (1984)
- Borealis (2013, pilot, Canada) IMDb
- Boy from Andromeda, The (1991, New Zealand, miniseries) IMDb
- BrainDead (2016)
- Brave New World (1998, film)
- Brick Bradford (1947)
- Brimstone (1998)
- Buck Rogers in the 25th Century (1979–1981)
- Buffy the Vampire Slayer (1997–2003) (elements of science fiction, primarily in seasons 4 and 6)
- Bugs (1995–1999, UK)
- Bunker, or Learning Underground (2006–2007, Russia)
- Burning Zone, The (1996–1997)

Animated

- Babel II (franchise):
  - Babel II (1973, Japan, animated)
  - Babel II: Beyond Infinity (2001, Japan, animated)
- Back to the Future: The Animated Series (1991–1992, animated)
- Batman (franchise):
  - Batman/Superman Hour, The (1968–1969, animated)
  - Adventures of Batman and Robin the Boy Wonder, The (1969–1970, animated)
  - New Adventures of Batman, The (1977–1981, animated)
  - Batman: The Animated Series (1992–1995, animated)
  - New Batman Adventures, The a.k.a. TNBA (1997–1999, Batman: The Animated Series sequel, animated)
  - Batman Beyond (1999–2001, animated)
  - Batman, The (2004–2008, animated)
  - Batman: The Brave and the Bold (2008–2011, animated)
  - Beware the Batman (2013–2014, animated)
- BattleTech: The Animated Series (1994, animated)
- Battletoads (1992, Canada/US, special, pilot, animated)
- Ben 10 (franchise):
  - Ben 10 (2005–2008, animated)
  - Ben 10: Secret of the Omnitrix (2007, animated, film)
  - Ben 10: Alien Force (2008–2010, animated)
  - Ben 10: Ultimate Alien (2010–2012, animated)
  - Ben 10: Destroy All Aliens a.k.a. Ben 10: Alien Dimensions (2012, film, animated)
  - Ben 10: Omniverse (2012–2014, animated)
  - Ben 10 (2016–2021, animated)
- Big Guy and Rusty the Boy Robot, The (1999–2001, animated)
- Big O, The (1999–2000, 2003, Japan, animated)
- Biker Mice from Mars (franchise):
  - Biker Mice from Mars (1993–1996, animated)
  - Biker Mice from Mars (2006–2007, animated)
- Bill & Ted's Excellent Adventures (1990–1991, animated)
- Bionic Six (1987–1989, animated)
- Birdman and the Galaxy Trio (1967–1969, animated)
- Black Heaven (1999, Japan, animated)
- Black Panther (2010, animated)
- Blassreiter (2008, Japan, animated)
- Blocker Gundan 4 Machine Blaster (1976–1977, Japan, animated)
- Blue Comet SPT Layzner (1985–1986, Japan, animated) a.k.a. Blue Meteor SPT Layzner (US)
- Blue Drop: Tenshitachi no Gikyoku (2007, Japan, animated)
- Blue Gender (1999–2000, Japan, animated)
- Bodacious Space Pirates (2012, Japan, animated)
- Bokurano (2007, Japan, animated)
- Bounty Hamster (2003, animated)
- Brats of the Lost Nebula (1998–1999, animated, puppetry)
- Brave series (franchise)
  - Brave Exkaiser (1990–1991, Japan, animated)
  - Brave Fighter of Sun Fighbird, The (1991–1992, Japan, animated)
  - Brave Fighter of Legend Da-Garn, The (1992–1993, Japan, animated)
  - Brave Express Might Gaine, The (1993–1994, Japan, animated)
  - Brave Police J-Decker (1994–1995, Japan, animated)
  - Brave of Gold Goldran, The (1995–1996, Japan, animated)
  - Brave Command Dagwon (1996–1997, Japan, animated)
  - King of Braves GaoGaiGar, The (1997–1998, Japan, animated)
  - Betterman (1999, Japan, animated)
  - King of Braves GaoGaiGar Final -Grand Glorious Gathering-, The (2005, Japan, animated)
- BraveStarr (1987–1988, animated)
- Bubblegum Crisis Tokyo 2040 (1998–1999, Japan, animated)
- Bucky O'Hare and the Toad Wars (1991, UK/US, animated)
- Buddy Complex (2014, Japan, animated)
- Bureau of Alien Detectors (1996, animated)
- Burst Angel (2004, Japan, animated)
- Buzz Lightyear of Star Command (2000–2002, animated)
