= Boreas (disambiguation) =

Boreas is the Greek god of the north wind, storms and winter.

Boreas may also refer to:

- Boreas (film), 2006 Turkish short drama film
- Boreas (journal), academic journal that covers all branches of Quaternary research
- Boreas (restaurant), Dutch Michelin starred restaurant
- Boreas (storm), November 2013 storm in 2013–14 North American winter#Late November storm complex
- Boreas (painting), a 1903 oil painting by John William Waterhouse
- 1916 Boreas, an asteroid
- Boreas Pass, in Colorado
- Boreas, one of the dogs that tore apart Actaeon

== See also ==
- Borea (disambiguation)
- Boreal (disambiguation)
- Borealis (disambiguation)
- Boreas Mountain (disambiguation)
