= Borea =

Borea may refer to:

== People ==
- Alberto Borea (b. ? ), Peruvian lawyer and politician
- Evelina Borea (b. 1931), Italian art historian and curator

== Air and water craft ==
- Caproni Ca.308 Borea, a small Italian airliner
- Italian destroyer Borea, various Italian naval ships
- SS Borea, a hotel and museum ship now known as the MS Bore
- Teichfuss Borea or LT.35 Borea, an Italian high-performance glider

== Other meanings ==
- Borea, an invalid synonym for the moth genus Eudonia
- Borea, Wisconsin, an unincorporated community in the United States
- SC Borea Dresden, a German football club
- Vera Borea, French fashion house

== See also ==
- Boreas (disambiguation)
- Boreal (disambiguation)
