= Boreas Mountain =

Boreas Mountain may refer to:

- Boreas Mountain (Colorado)
- Boreas Mountain (New York)

== See also ==
- Boreas (disambiguation)
