= Borealis =

Borealis (Latin for northern or of the north) may refer to:

== Astronomy ==
- Borealis Basin or North Polar Basin, a basin on the planet Mars
  - Vastitas Borealis, a sub-basin of the Borealis Basin
- Borealis quadrangle, an area on the planet Mercury
  - Borealis Planitia, a basin within the quadrangle

== Transportation ==
- Borealis (train), an Amtrak inter-city rail service
- MS Borealis, a cruise ship of Fred. Olsen Cruise Lines

== Organizations ==
- Borealis AG, an international company based in Vienna, Austria, which produces polyethylene and polypropylene
- Borealis Alliance, an alliance among the north-west European Air Navigation Service Providers
- Borealis Exploration, a Gibraltar-based research and development company
- OMERS Infrastructure, formerly Borealis Infrastructure, an investment division of OMERS (Ontario Municipal Employees Retirement System)

== Media ==
- Borealis (band), a power metal band from Ontario, Canada
- Borealis (festival), a Norwegian music festival
- Borealis (2008 film), a documentary film directed by Frank Wolf
- Borealis (2013 film) (a/k/a Survival Code), a science fiction television film directed by David Frazee
- Borealis (2015 film), a comedy-drama film directed by Sean Garrity
- Borealis (2020 film), a documentary film directed by Kevin McMahon
- Borealis Records, a Canadian record label
- Borealis, a ship in the Half-Life and Portal video game series
- Borealis, the Freezing Fog , a creature from the 2022 video game Elden Ring
- Borealis, a song from the 2019 album Good Faith by French music producer Madeon

== Other ==
- Borealis, a configuration of the Canadian NAACO Brigadier pistol

== See also ==
- Aurora Borealis (disambiguation)
- Boreal (disambiguation)
