= Borealis (2008 film) =

- Directed by: Frank Wolf
- Starring: Taku Hokoyama, Frank Wolf
- Music by: Grant Baldwin
- Release date: 2008
- Running time: 63 minutes
- Country: Canada
- Language: English

Borealis is a 2008 documentary film by Frank Wolf that follows two friends on a 3,100 km canoe adventure through the northern Boreal forest of Manitoba and Ontario. The film looks at the industrial threats to the pristine, vast wilderness north of the 51st parallel from the perspective of those who live in the region. The film is notable for its quirky and humorous tone in spite of the subject matter. It won the Grand Prize as well as Prize for Best Canadian Film at the 2009 Vancouver International Mountain Film Festival and was one of the Top Ten Most Popular Canadian Films at the 2008 Vancouver International Film Festival. It aired multiple times on CBC's documentary in Canada in 2009–10.

== About the Filmmaker ==
Frank Wolf (born in 1970) is a Canadian filmmaker, adventurer, writer and environmentalist. Wolf's creative works specialize in adventure and environmental documentary film. His handful of films include Wild Ones, The Hand of Franklin, Kitturiaq, On the Line, Mammalian, and Borealis, all of which broadcast on CBC's documentary channel in Canada. Wolf, acts as starring role and director in his films, using a humorous approach in order to make the environmentalist and adventurer documentaries appealing to a broader audience.

== Awards ==
•2008 Vancouver International Film Festival Official Selection: runner-up for NFB audience award, best documentary

•2009 Vancouver International Mountain Film Festival Official Selection: winner of Grand Prize for best overall film, winner of prize for best Canadian film

•2009 Beloit International Film Festival Official Selection

•2009 Powell River Film Festival Official Selection

•2009 Reel Paddling Film Festival Official Selection

•2009 New Zealand Mountain Film Festival Official Selection

== Reviews ==
"The challenge of making this film was almost as severe as the challenge of the journey it depicts. The makers showed great imagination to get around the limitations of a zero budget, livening up the narrative with interviews, jokes, sight gags, even dance! It gently raised important issues along the way, allowing these issues to arise quite naturally out of the journey itself." -VIMFF Jury Statement for Grand Prize winner 'Borealis'

"An appealing ground-level spin on environmental issues" - The Vancouver Province
