= Tribeca (disambiguation) =

Tribeca or TriBeCa may refer to:

== Places ==
- Tribeca, a neighborhood in Manhattan, New York City, in the United States
- Tribeca Belfast, an urban redevelopment project in Belfast, Northern Ireland

== Media ==
- TriBeCa (TV series), dramatic anthology series produced by Robert De Niro and Jane Rosenthal
- Tribeca Festival, film festival founded in 2002
- TriBeCa Productions, a film and TV production company
- Angie Tribeca, an American comedy television series

== Other ==
- Subaru Tribeca, a sport utility vehicle
- Tribeca Poker Network
- Tribeca (restaurant), restaurant with two Michelin stars in Heeze, The Netherlands
