= Lines on a Map =

2018 book by Frank Wolf

Lines on a Map: Unparalleled Adventures in Modern Exploration
- Front paperback cover art for Lines on a Map.
- Author: Frank Wolf
- Language: English
- Subject: Adventure
- Publisher: Rocky Mountain Books
- Publication date: October 9, 2018
- Publication place: Canada
- Media type: Print (paperback), e-book
- Pages: 328
- ISBN: 978-1771602891

Lines on a Map: Unparalleled Adventures in Modern Exploration is a book by Canadian author and adventurer Frank Wolf. It is his first book, published in October 2018 by Rocky Mountain Books.

== Background ==
The book is based on self-propelled wilderness expeditions Wolf has undertaken in North America, Scandinavia, and Asia. It has 24 chapters, each representing a different expedition or 'line on a map', that Wolf completed between 1995 and 2017. 16 of the chapters are from previously published articles in Explore, Westjet, Sea Kayaker, Action Asia, Wend, Paddler, River, Adventure Kayak, and Canoeroots. The other eight chapters are previously unpublished. The foreword for the book was written by acclaimed author and journalist John Vaillant.

== Overview ==
The book opens with an overview map of North America, Scandinavia, and Asia, showing the wilderness areas where each of the 24 chapters in the book take place. Each individual chapter opens with a detail map showing the route written about in that particular chapter. There is also a section of 77 colour photographs from the various journeys included.

Some of the stories covered in the chapters include: two friends on a cycling and volcano-climbing odyssey across Java, the most populous island in the world's most populous Muslim country, Indonesia, in the wake of 9/11; a surreal private lunch with former Prime Minister Pierre Trudeau during an 8000 km canoe journey across Canada; discovering the past and present on a 900 km hiking and kayaking journey from Skagway, Alaska, to Dawson City, Yukon; negotiating the cultural divide during a whitewater paddling expedition in Laos and Cambodia with Russian extreme kayakers; exploring the nature and politics of the Enbridge Northern Gateway Pipelines in northern BC by hiking, biking and kayaking the GPS track of the proposed project route from the oil sands to the British Columbia coast; conducting a mammal tracking survey in the course of a 120 km ski traverse of Banff National Park; discovering the truth about the existence of Sasquatch in northern Ontario; retracing Viking history during a canoe trip across Scandinavia.

From the publisher", Wolf weaves together humour, drama and local knowledge to transport readers to some of the outermost corners of the globe in an epic quest to celebrate the freedom to move, explore and be wild."

== Reception ==
The book was selected as one of 5 finalists in the Adventure Travel category at the 2019 edition of the prestigious Banff Mountain Book Festival.

Outside (magazine) called the book '...a collection of stellar travel journalism'.

Grant Lawrence of the Vancouver Courier named the book one of his 'Top Five books of 2018' by Vancouver authors, writing: "Wolf has survived countless worldwide explorations, and the magic of this book is reading about how he did it. Lines On A Map is written with self-aware humour, high-stakes survivalist drama and a frank awareness of our fragile, beautiful planet".

Canadian Geographic named Lines on a Map one of their 'Favourite Books of 2018'. From the review by Nick Walker, managing editor of Canadian Geographic writing: "...a gripping montage of his quests, body-breaking travails and the humour that gets him through".

John Gellard of The Ormsby Review: "You will cheer as you read Wolf's humorous and exciting narratives. If not, you will be inspired by his sheer strength and indomitable will to prevail."
