= Boreal =

Boreal, northern, of the north. Derived from the name of the god of the north wind from Ancient Greek civilisation, Boreas. It may also refer to:

== Climatology and geography ==
- Boreal (age), the first climatic phase of the Blytt-Sernander sequence of northern Europe, during the Holocene epoch
- Boreal climate, a climate characterized by long winters and short, cool to mild summers
- Boreal ecosystem, an ecosystem with a subarctic climate in the Northern Hemisphere
- Boreal forest, a biome characterized by coniferous forests
- Boreal Sea, a Mesozoic-era seaway

== Companies and organizations ==
- Boreale, a Quebec microbrewery
- Boreal Mountain Resort, a ski resort in the Lake Tahoe area of California
- Boreal Norge, a Norwegian public transport operator
- Collège Boréal, a francophone college in Ontario, Canada

== Other uses ==
- Boreal (horse), a racehorse
- Carlo Boreal, a fictional character in Philip Pullman's His Dark Materials trilogy
- Le Boreal, a French cruise ship
- Renault Boreal, a compact crossover SUV
- Borealism, the exoticisation of the northern regions of the Earth and their cultures

== See also ==
- Boreal forest of Canada, a region covering much of Canada's land area
- Boreal Forest Conservation Framework, a plan to protect the Canadian boreal forest
- Borean languages, a hypothetical language family comprising languages of the Northern Hemisphere
- Boreal Shield Ecozone (CEC), region of ancient rock in Canada
- Borea (disambiguation)
- Borealis (disambiguation)
- Boreas (disambiguation)
- Septentrional
