= Boreas (restaurant) =

- Interactive map of Boreas

Restaurant information
- Head chef: Nico Boreas
- Food type: French
- Rating: Michelin Guide
- Location: Jan Deckersstraat 7, Heeze, 5591 HN, Netherlands
- Coordinates: 51°22′45″N 5°34′41″E
- Seating capacity: 50
- Website: restaurant-boreas.nl

Boreas is a defunct restaurant located in Heeze in the Netherlands. It was a fine dining restaurant that was awarded one Michelin stars from the period 2002–2009 and two Michelin stars from the period 2010–2016. GaultMillau awarded them 19.0 points (out of 20) in 2011.

Boreas was run by head chef Nico Boreas and his wife and maître Sonja Boreas.

The restaurant was member of Les Patrons Cuisiniers.

On 25 April 2016 it was announced that the restaurant would close on 23 July 2016. The owners wanted to do something else and an interesting party appeared to take over the restaurant. New owner is Jan Sobecki, the two-starred chef of the closed down restaurant Chapeau!, who started the new restaurant Tribeca in mid August. In the spring of 2018, Nico and Sonja Boreas opened a new restaurant in Roermond, called Sabero. A place of the same name in Spain, but also an anagram of their previous restaurant Boreas. This eatery was also immediately awarded two Michelin stars.

== See also ==
- List of Michelin starred restaurants in the Netherlands
