= Mammalian (film) =

- Directed by: Frank Wolf
- Release date: September 30, 2010
- Country: Canada
- Language: English

Mammalian is a 2010 documentary film that follows Frank Wolf and Taku Hokoyama as they take on a 2,000 km canoe journey through the largest wilderness area in North America. Their route travels from Yellowknife, YT to Rankin Inlet, NT through a region with one of the highest concentrations of land mammals on earth. The pair encounter Arctic wolves, the caribou migration, musk ox and- most importantly- make the first ever recording of a rare and elusive creature not previously thought to exist in northern Canada. With a sense of humour and purpose, they track down politicians, First Nation chiefs, elders and others living in the few communities that frame the wilderness in order to present a clear picture of the area and the issues that face the land and its people. The film was the winner of the 'Best Environment Film' at the 2011 Kendal Mountain Festival and was one of the Top Ten Most Popular Canadian Films of the 2010 Vancouver International Film Festival. It aired on CBC's documentary (TV channel) in Canada multiple times through 2013.
