= Borealis Alliance =

Borealis Alliance is an alliance among the north-west European Air Navigation Service Providers. Three Functional airspace blocks are part of the Alliance - IRL/UK, DK/SE & NEFAB - most members already cooperate in Noracon.

== Overview ==
The ANSP Alliance that enables its Members to drive better performance for stakeholders through business collaboration.

== Legal basis ==
The Alliance agreement defines how these close competitors will work together.

== Funding and Budget ==
The Alliance shares costs.

== Members ==
The members of the Borealis Alliance are:

- Avinor
- EANS
- Fintraffic ANS
- IAA
- ISAVIA
- Latvijas Gaisa Satiksme (LGS)
- LFV
- NATS
- Naviair
