= Frank Wolf (adventurer) =

Canadian writer, filmmaker, and environmentalist (born 1970)

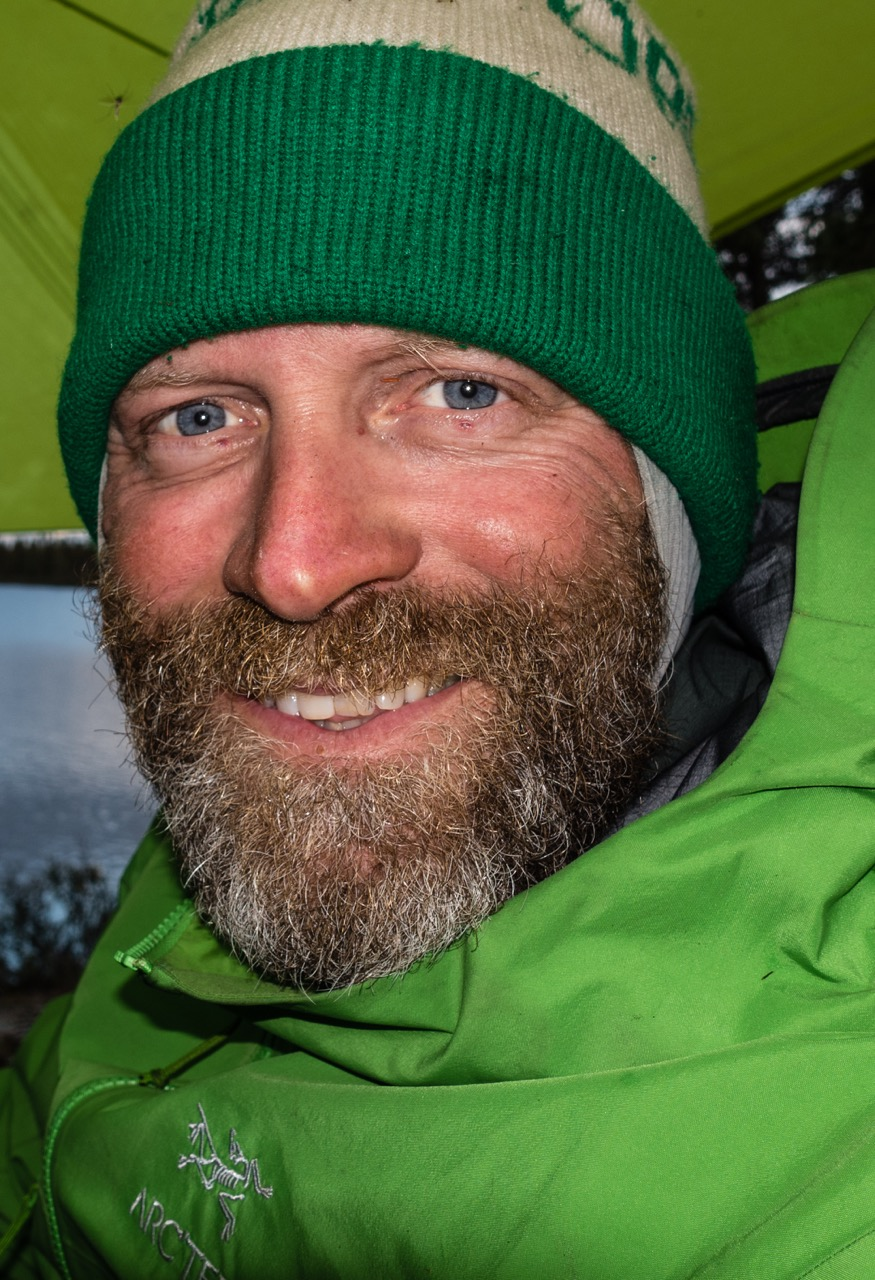
- Frank Wolf during the Maze of the North expedition
- Born: 1970 (age 55–56)
- Occupations: Adventurer, writer, filmmaker, environmentalist

Frank Wolf (born 1970) is a Canadian adventurer, writer, filmmaker, and environmentalist. He is known for books, feature magazine articles, online columns, and films that document wilderness expeditions around the world, with a focus on the Canadian North. His expeditions include being the first to canoe across Canada in one season and cycling 2,000 km in winter on the Yukon River from Dawson to Nome. In 2020 he was named One of Canada's Greatest 90 Explorers of All Time by Canadian Geographic. and in 2012 he was named one of Canada's Top Ten Adventurers by Explore. He has written two books on his adventures: Two Springs, One Summer (2024) and Lines on a Map (2018), both published by RMB. His films include Wild Ones, The Hand of Franklin, Kitturiaq, On the Line, Mammalian, and Borealis, all of which broadcast on CBC's Documentary Channel in Canada.

== Expeditions ==
A map of Frank Wolf's self-propelled wilderness expeditions in North America

Map of Frank Wolf's self-propelled expeditions in North America

- (2026) Nèhtrùh Expedition: 21-day, 1,200 km canoe journey from Elliot Lake, to Old Crow with Alex Kozma
- (2025) Deh Cho Solo Expedition: 21-day, 1,620 km solo kayak journey down the length of the Mackenzie River, from Hay River to Inuvik
- (2025) Taan Expedition: 25-day, 720 km kayak journey through the Alaskan Panhandle, in the month of May, starting from and returning to Prince Rupert, with Dave Berrisford
- (2024) Yamozha Expedition: 36-day, 1,350 km canoe journey from Yellowknife to Kugluqtuk via the Yellowknife River, Starvation River, Rockinghorse Lake, Hood River, and the Northwest Passage with Arturo Simondetti
- (2024) Kangiqluk Expedition: 18-day, 325 km ski journey in the Clyde River region of Baffin Island with Dave Garrow and John McClelland
- (2024) Round the Gap Expedition: 19-day, 500 km kayak journey from Colon, Panama to Turbo, Colombia around the Darién Gap with Mark Sky
- (2023) Tongait Expedition: 27-day, 920 km kayak journey via Ungava Bay and the Labrador Sea from Kangiqsualujjuaq, to Nain, with Justine Curgenven, JF Marleau, and Larry Chomyn
- (2023) Laxmoon Expedition : Solo 14-day, 400 km kayak journey along the north coast of British Columbia via Porcher Island, Banks Island, Campania Island and Price Island from Prince Rupert to Bella Bella
- (2022) Goba Expedition : 30-day, 1300 km canoe journey from the Yukon/NWT border to Kugluktuk via the Tsichu River, Keele River, Great Bear River, Great Bear Lake, Sloane River, Hook River and Coppermine River with Alex Kozma.
- (2022) Pikialasorsuaq Expedition : 20-day, 300 km ski journey along the North Water Polynya, over the Devon Ice Cap, and across Jones Sound to finish at Grise Fiord on Ellesmere Island, with Dave Garrow and John McClelland.
- (2021) Sa Tu Expedition: 30-day, 1360 km canoe circuit along the Athabasca River, Lake Athabasca, Fond Du Lac River, Cree River, Cree Lake, Black Birch Lake, Careen Lake, and Clearwater River starting and finishing in Fort McMurray, with Dave Greene.
- (2021) Qwunus Expedition: 38-day, 1320 km kayak journey circumnavigating Vancouver Island, starting and finishing in West Vancouver, with Dave Berrisford and Amber Blenkiron.
- (2020) Sine Tanize Expedition : 25-day, 1060 km canoe expedition through Manitoba from Sandy Bay First Nation to Hudson Bay, via the Churchill River, Barrington River, and Seal River with Shauna Liora.
- (2020) The Bear and the Wolf Paddle North : 27-day, 1000 km sea kayak expedition along the west coast of British Columbia from Squamish to Prince Rupert, with Dave Berrisford.
- (2019) The Lakeland Traverse : 20-day, 800 km canoe expedition through Finland from Nurmes to Helsinki, with Todd McGowan.
- (2019) Arctic Return : 18-day, 350 km ski expedition from Naujaat to Pelly Bay, with David Reid and Richard Smith. Reid and Smith continued on for another 200 km to Rae Strait after Wolf had to abandon the journey due to injury.
- (2018) Baffin Ski Traverse : 14-day, 230 km ski expedition across Baffin Island via the Penny Ice Cap, with Dave Garrow and John McClelland.
- (2018) Across the Barrens : 35-day, 1750 km canoe expedition from Yellowknife to the Arctic Ocean via Great Slave Lake, Pike's Portage, and the Back River with Ryan Bougie.
- (2017) Maze of the North Expedition : 30-day, 1350 km canoe expedition from Pekans River bridge on Quebec Route 389 to Umiujaq, Quebec with Peirson Ross Mclean.
- (2017) Angilaaq Mountain Expedition : 12-day, 160 km ski expedition on Bylot Island to summit Angilaaq Mountain, its highest peak, as well as 4 other sub-peaks, with Dave Garrow.
- (2016) Maskwa Nanook Expedition : 44-day, 1800 km canoe journey from La Ronge, Saskatchewan to Baker Lake, Nunavut, with Shawn Campbell.
- (2015) Spatsizi/Stikine Expedition : 9-day, 280 km pack rafting/hiking route through the Spatsizi/Stikine Wilderness with Shawn Campbell.
- (2015) Wild Ones Music Tour: 24-day, 750 km concert tour by canoe from Parry Sound to Ottawa- with musician Peirson Ross.
- (2015) Mammal Ski Survey : 7-day, 110 km ski traverse with biologist tracking and logging large mammals in Banff National Park- with Dave Garrow and Ross Glenfield.
- (2014) Sweetwater Soul : 26-day, 1350 km journey by canoe from Pine Dock, MB to Fort Severn, ON- with Rob Hart.
- (2013) Mainstream Last First : 55-day, 1870 km journey by rowboat through Northwest Passage from Inuvik to Cambridge Bay, with Kevin Vallely, Paul Gleeson, Denis Barnett.
- (2012) Kitturiaq : 21-day, 620 km first-ever journey by canoe over the Labrador Plateau from Nain, NL to Kangiqsualujjuaq, QC, with Todd McGowan.
- (2011) Boreal Heart : 25-day, 1120 km journey by canoe through Ontario's Little North from Pakashkan Lake to Peawanuck, ON, with Todd McGowan.
- (2010) On the Line : 53-day, 2400 km by bike, foot, pack raft, and kayak investigating the proposed Enbridge Northern Gateway Pipelines project, with Todd McGowan.
- (2009) Mammalian : 46-day, 2004 km journey by canoe through North America's largest wilderness from Yellowknife to Rankin Inlet, with Taku Hokoyama.
- (2008) Bay or Bust : 25-day, 1050 km journey by canoe from Opeongo Lake to Moosonee, ON, with Alex Raymont.
- (2007) Borealis : 75-day, 3100 km journey by canoe from Winnipeg to Parry Sound looking into the issues affecting the world's largest carbon bank- the Boreal Forest of Ontario and Manitoba with Taku Hokoyama.
- (2006) Sandakan Death March : Retracing of tragic WWII Sandakan Death March with Australian Military personnel, and Kevin Vallely.
- (2005) Shining Islands : 43-day, 900 km kayak circumnavigation of the Haida Gwaii archipelago, with Keith Klapstein and Todd Macfie.
- (2004) Across Asgaard : 26-day, 800 km journey by canoe across Scandinavia from Bogden, Norway to Oulu, Finland, with Todd Macfie.
- (2004) Taming the Motoco : 17-day journey by foot to the source of the Motoco River in Patagonia with a group of Argentinian explorers.
- (2003) Bikes on Ice : 49-day, 2000 km journey by bike in winter on the Yukon River from Dawson to Nome retracing the route of two gold miners from 1901, with Kevin Vallely and Andy Sterns.
- (2003) Nam Pha : 2nd descent of Nam Pha River in Laos in search of the Asian Water Tiger, with Mick O'Shea and Brian Eustis.
- (2000) Phuket, Paddles, and Pirates : three-month sea kayaking/whitewater kayaking journey through Thailand/Malaysia/Indonesia, with David Stibbe.
- (1998) Canadian Quest : 35-day, 1500 km journey by canoe from Prince Rupert to Carcajou, with Ben O'Hara.
- (1995) C2C : 171-day, 8000 km journey by canoe across Canada from Saint John, NB to Vancouver, BC, with Roman Rockliffe.

== Writing ==
Wolf is a regular feature writer, blogger, and photographer for Explore, and has written dozens of features for other publications including Mountain Life, Coast Mountain Culture, Westjet, Canoeroots, Reader's Digest, Action Asia, Adventure Kayak, Paddler, Wend, and The Province. He has written two books: Lines on a Map, (2018) and Two Springs, One Summer (2024), both published by Rocky Mountain Books (RMB).

== Films ==
- Wild Ones (2017 film); Winner for 'Best Musical Adventure', 2017 Waterwalker Film Festival, Official Selection of 2017 Vancouver International Mountain Film Festival,
- The Hand of Franklin (2015 film); Winner for 'Best Documentary Feature' at the 2016 Ramunas Atelier International Film Awards, Winner for Best Canadian Film at 2015 Vancouver International Mountain Film Festival; Winner of the 'Adventure Award' at the 2016 San Francisco International Ocean Film Festival;
- Kitturiaq (2013 film); Winner for Best Adventure Film and Best Filmmaker at 2014 Waterwalker Film Festival; Kitturiaq Interview; Kitturiaq Film Review;
- On the Line (2011 film); Winner of the 'Spirit of Action Prize' at the 2012 Santa Cruz Film Festival'; Chosen for 'VIFF Selects' at the 2011 Vancouver International Film Festival;
- Mammalian (2010 film); Top Ten most popular Canadian Films at the 2010 Vancouver International Film Festival; Winner of the 'Best Environment Film' at the 2011 Kendal Mountain Festival; Winner of the 2011 Reel Paddling Festival's "Best Canoeing Film";
- Borealis (2008 film); Winner of Grand Prize and Best Canadian Film at 2009 Vancouver International Mountain Film Festival;
- Exhibit Eh! (2007 TV series)
- X-Quest (2004-2006 TV series)

== Public speaking ==
Wolf has given talks about his adventures and environmental work at TEDx, FEAT, and numerous other events.
