= Aurora Borealis (disambiguation) =

The aurora borealis is a name for auroras occurring in the Northern Hemisphere.

Aurora borealis may also refer to:

== Music ==
- Aurora Borealis (Canadian band), late 1960s rock band from Toronto, Canada
- Aurora Borealis (band), a black metal band from Maryland, U.S.
- Aurora Borealis, a piano concerto by Geirr Tveitt

=== Albums ===
- Aurora Borealis, a 1996 EP by Einherjer
- Aurora Borealis (album), a 2004 album by Cloud Cult

=== Songs ===
- "Aurora Borealis", by Celldweller from Soundtrack for the Voices in My Head Vol. 1, 2008
- "Aurora Borealis", by Eternal Tears of Sorrow from A Virgin and a Whore, 2001
- "Aurora Borealis", by Jukka Tolonen, from The Hook, 1974
- "Aurora Borealis", by the Meat Puppets, from Meat Puppets II, 1984
- "Aurora Borealis", by Pelican, from The Fire in Our Throats Will Beckon the Thaw, 2005
- "Aurora Borealis", by the 3rd and the Mortal, from Painting on Glass, 1996

== Other uses ==
- Aurora Borelias (painting), an 1865 painting by Frederic Edwin Church
- Aurora Borealis (film), a 2005 romantic drama
- Aurora Borealis (icebreaker), a proposed European research icebreaker
- Aurora Borealis, a type of art glass made by Swarovski

== See also ==
- Borealis (disambiguation)
