= Tribeca (restaurant) =

Coordinates: 51°22′45.51″N 5°34′40.95″E

- Interactive map of Tribeca

Restaurant information
- Established: 15 August 2016
- Head chef: Jan Sobecki
- Food type: French
- Location: Jan Deckersstraat 7, Heeze, 5591 HN, Netherlands
- Seating capacity: 60
- Website: restaurant-tribeca.nl

Tribeca is a restaurant in Heeze, Netherlands. It is a fine dining restaurant that is awarded two Michelin stars for 2017.

Head chef of the restaurant is Jan Sobecki.

The restaurant is housed in a building founded in 1916. Before Sobecki moved in, the building housed the restaurant Boreas, ran by head chef Nico Boreas. Sobecki, who used to work at the two starred Chapeau! that closed on 1 August 2016, could take over the restaurant smoothly. The restaurant was opened on 15 August 2016.

== Name ==
The restaurant in named after Tribeca, a neighbourhood in New York City.

== See also ==
- List of Michelin starred restaurants in the Netherlands
