= Italian destroyer Borea =

Borea was the name of at least two ships of the Italian Navy and may refer to:

- Italian destroyer Borea (1902), a Nembo-class destroyer launched in 1902 and sunk in 1917.
- Italian destroyer Borea (1927), a Turbine-class destroyer launched in 1927 and sunk in 1940.
