= Explore (magazine) =

Canadian outdoor magazine

explore
- Categories: Destination, outdoors, fitness, lifestyle
- Frequency: Quarterly
- Publisher: David Webb David Webb
- Founded: 1981
- Company: Explore Outdoor Media Inc.
- Country: Canada
- Based in: Vancouver
- Language: English
- Website: explore-mag.com

explore is a Canadian publication focusing on outdoor lifestyle content. The magazine is published four times a year by Explore outdoor Media Inc. Each issue highlights travel adventures to remote corners of Canada and beyond. The magazine also features gear and events across the country. It is headquartered in Vancouver.

== History ==
explore was founded in 1981.

In the summer of 2012, explore was sold to OP Publishing by Cottage Life Media Inc. in exchange for OP Publishing's Cottage magazine. David Webb, formerly the editor of Western Sportsman and The Outdoor Edge magazines, became editor in November 2012. In November 2013, My Passion Media acquired explore Magazine alongside InfoBarrel and Canadian Traveller. In April 2014 ExploreTheUSA.com, explore magazine's sister publication was launched. In 2016, explore's Live the Adventure Club was launched—a quarterly curated subscription box. In 2019, the company launched "Explore Magazine's Live the Adventure Podcast." In 2022, Explore Outdoor Media Inc. formed as an independent media company and the publisher of Explore Magazine and the website CanadianTraveller.com (discontinued). Editor David Webb was appointed President & Publisher of Explore Outdoor Media Inc. at that time.

Noted writers include Frank Wolf Frank Wolf (adventurer), Kevin Callan Kevin Callan, Will Gadd Will Gadd and more.
