= Beyond Reality (TV series) =

Television series

- Genre: Science fiction
- Written by: James Kahn; Robin Bernheim; Richard Manning; Gordon Farr; Marc Scott Zicree; Durnford King
- Directed by: Allan Kroeker; Mario Azzopardi; René Bonnière; Bruce Pittman; Randy Bradshaw; Eleanor Lindo; Jorge Montesi
- Starring: Shari Belafonte; Carl Marotte
- Countries of origin: Canada; United States
- Original language: English
- No. of seasons: 2
- No. of episodes: 44 (list of episodes)

Production
- Executive producers: Jon Slan; Ron Ziskin; Shukri Ghalayini
- Producers: Richard Borchiver; Hans Beimler
- Production locations: Toronto, Ontario, Canada
- Cinematography: Maris H. Jansons
- Editors: Dave Goard; Gary L. Smith
- Running time: 30 minutes
- Production company: Paragon Entertainment Corporation

Original release
- Network: Syndication (U.S.); CTV (Canada)
- Release: October 4, 1991 – March 20, 1993

Beyond Reality is a science fiction television series which originally aired between October 4, 1991 and March 20, 1993. The series is about two university parapsychologists (Shari Belafonte and Carl Marotte) who investigate reports of paranormal phenomena that occur in ordinary people's lives.

== Home media ==
Mill Creek Entertainment released the complete first season on DVD in Region 1 on January 23, 2007.
