= Kitturiaq =

2013 television film

Kitturiaq is a 2013 Canadian documentary film by Frank Wolf that follows two friends on a remote 620 km wilderness canoe journey over the vast Labrador Plateau. Set in the Inuit/Innu regions of Nunatsiavut and Nunavik, the film shares the cultural perspectives of local people in the context of the journey. The film airs on CBC's documentary (TV channel) in Canada and features music by Patrick Watson, Half Moon Run, The Cyrillic Typewriter, Wintermitts, Boucan Sound System, and throat singers Sylvia Cloutier and Madeleine Allakariallak.
