= Vera Borea =

French fashion house

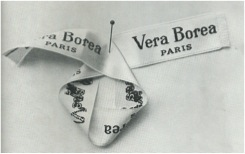
- Founded: 1931
- Founder: Countess Borea de Buzzaccherini Regoli
- Products: Made-to-order, ready-to-wear, sportswear, leather goods, shoes

Vera Borea is a French fashion house founded in 1931 in Paris, France, by Countess Vera Borea de Buzzaccherini Regoli.

Vera Borea was one of the first houses to offer luxury sportswear for women. The house produced high-end garments for ski, tennis, golf, beach, boating, motoring, biking and hunting, alongside day and evening dresses, accessories, shoes and jewellery.

Known for expertly tailored sports and travel suits and dresses, Vera Borea came to fame with its innovative designs that promoted a new lifestyle, and acceptance of fashion sportswear as appropriate wear for other social occasions.

== History ==
=== Sports models for city wear : a couture house dedicated to sportswear ===
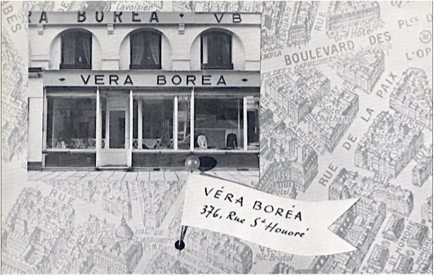
Vera Borea boutique, Rue Saint-Honore, in 1949

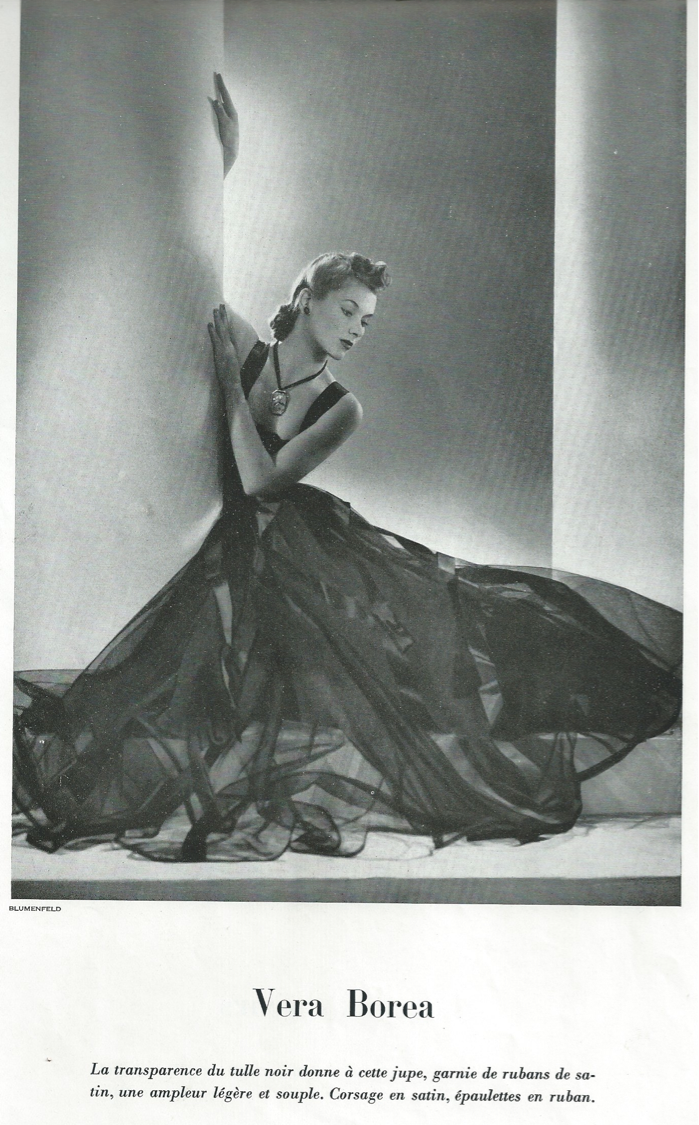
Evening Dresse 1939. Photo by Erwin Blumenfeld.

Countess Vera Borea de Buzzaccherini Regoli, a passionate sportswoman born and raised in Italian Dolomites, was frustrated by a lack of clothing that was chic yet comfortable and began to design sportswear, négligées and swimming suits featuring special knitting stitch invented by her grandmother

With assistance of her friend, the British-born Princess de Rohan, the countess located her haute-couture salon at 29 rue d'Artois, at the very end of Faubourg Saint-Honoré. With growing success, the house established in 1935 a two-story shop at 376 rue Saint Honoré, which remained open until 2007.

With a no-nonsense, hands-on approach, Vera Borea, an avid skier, swimmer and golfer, tried out her creations on herself before she offered them for sale, and often modelled them for clients. The designs appeared smart enough to be worn in town, reuniting sports and town wardrobes.

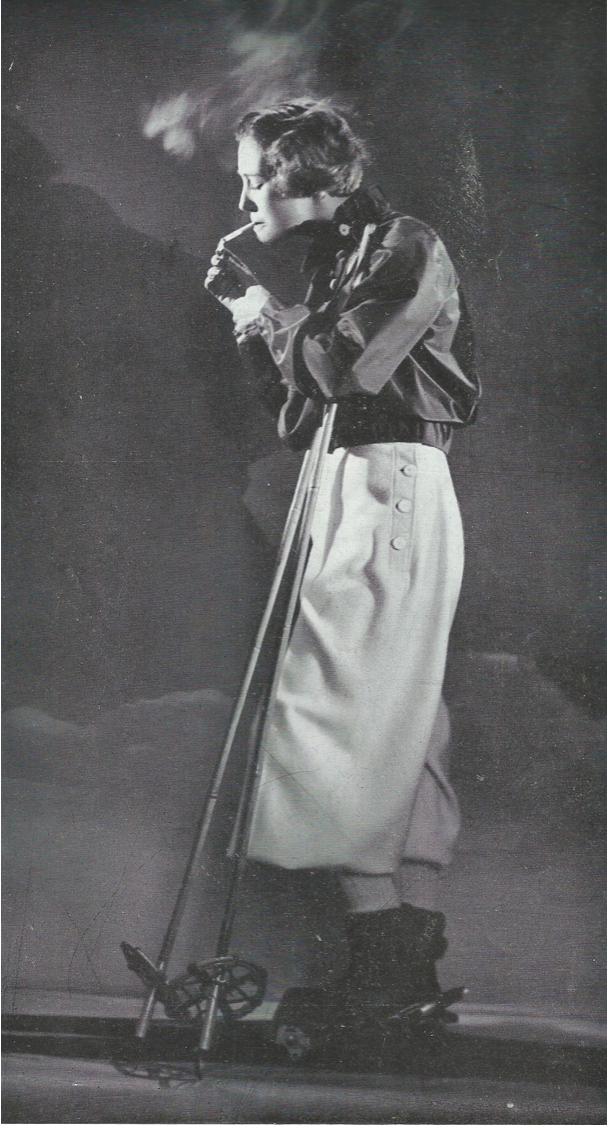
Ski suit, 1933

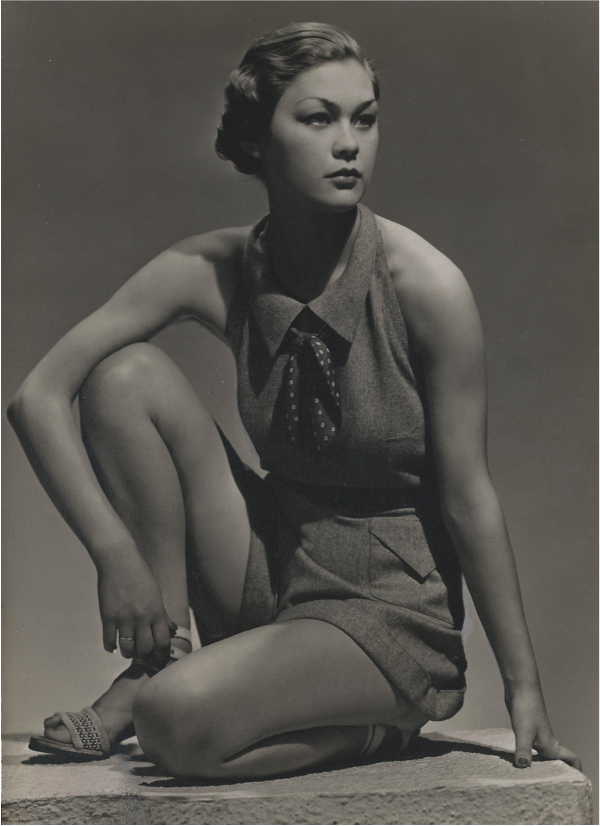
Jumpsuit, 1934

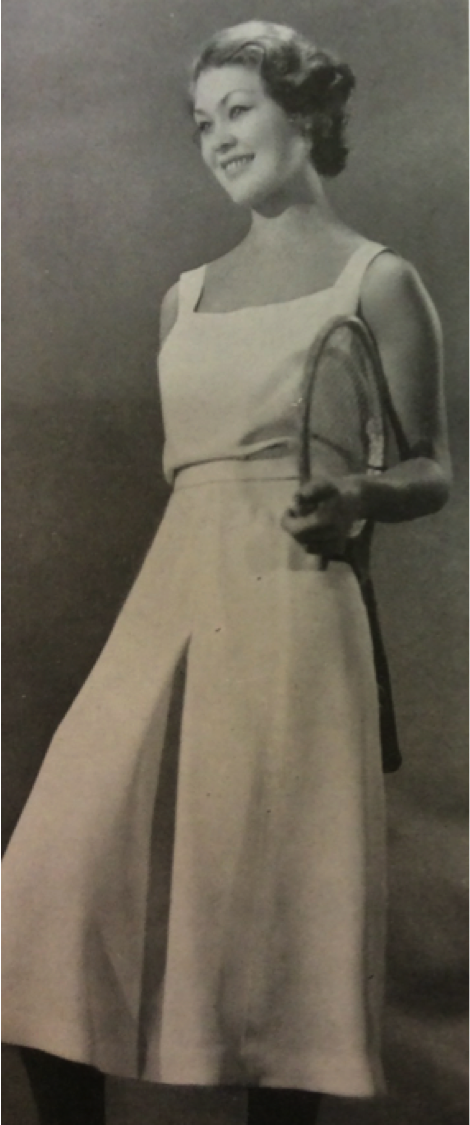
Tennis dress, 1934

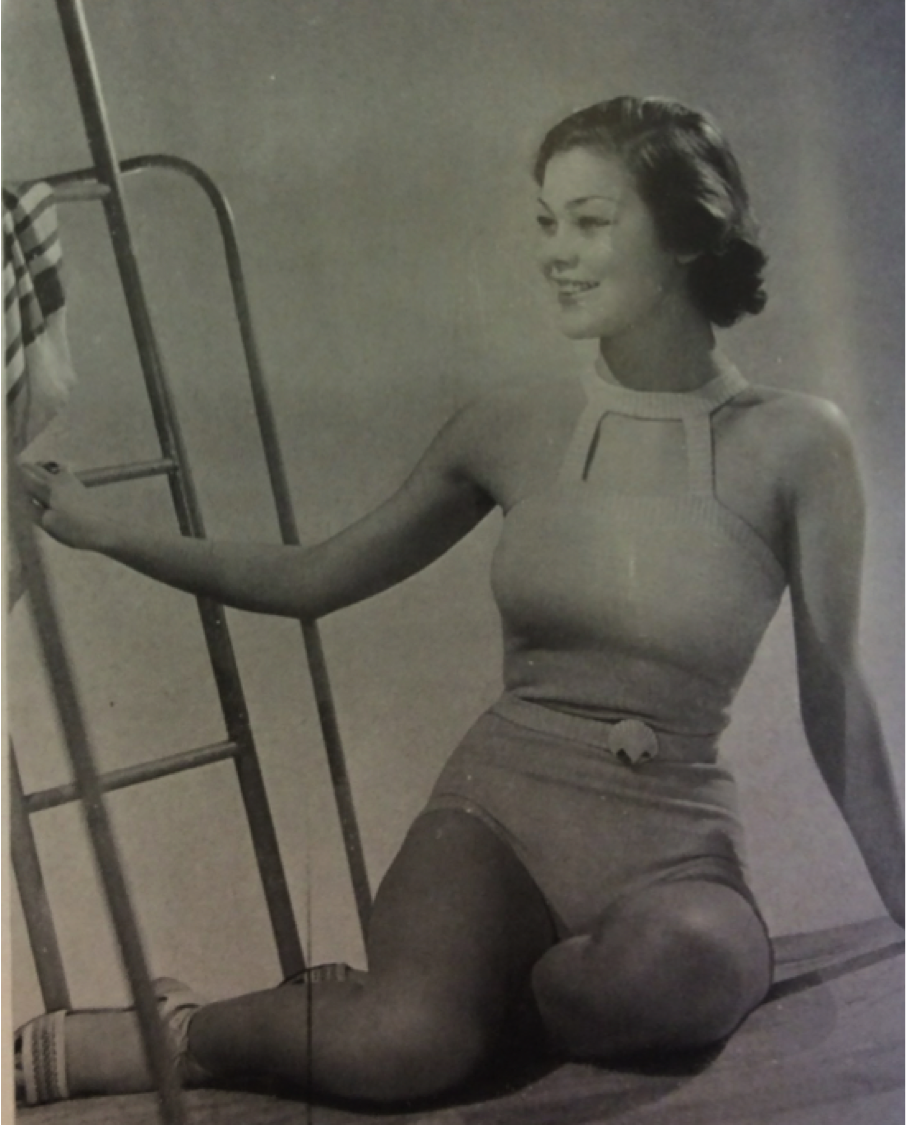
Swimming suit, 1934

=== International success ===
Vera Borea soon became the favorite destination on both sides of the Atlantic for women going for the new relaxed lifestyle.

American department stores snapped her designs and the house became the reference for garments that were simple in line but unusual in materials and cut, modern and practical. Vera Borea's creations often featured details that, beyond looking good, served a practical purpose and could be wore on multiple occasions such as after tennis, for motoring or on a ship.

Prestigious fashion magazines featured Vera Borea's creations alongside Hermès, Lanvin, Chanel and Patou. Her designs were copied with those of Vionnet, Schiaparelli, Lanvin and Patou.

Scores of Americans soon joined the regular French clients at Vera Borea's Paris salon, including famous sportswomen such as Helen Wills and Suzanne Lenglen and Hollywood movie stars such as Joan Bennett.

Until the retirement in 1962, Vera Borea was considered one of the grand Parisian couturiers of its days and was a member of Parisian Haute-Couture.

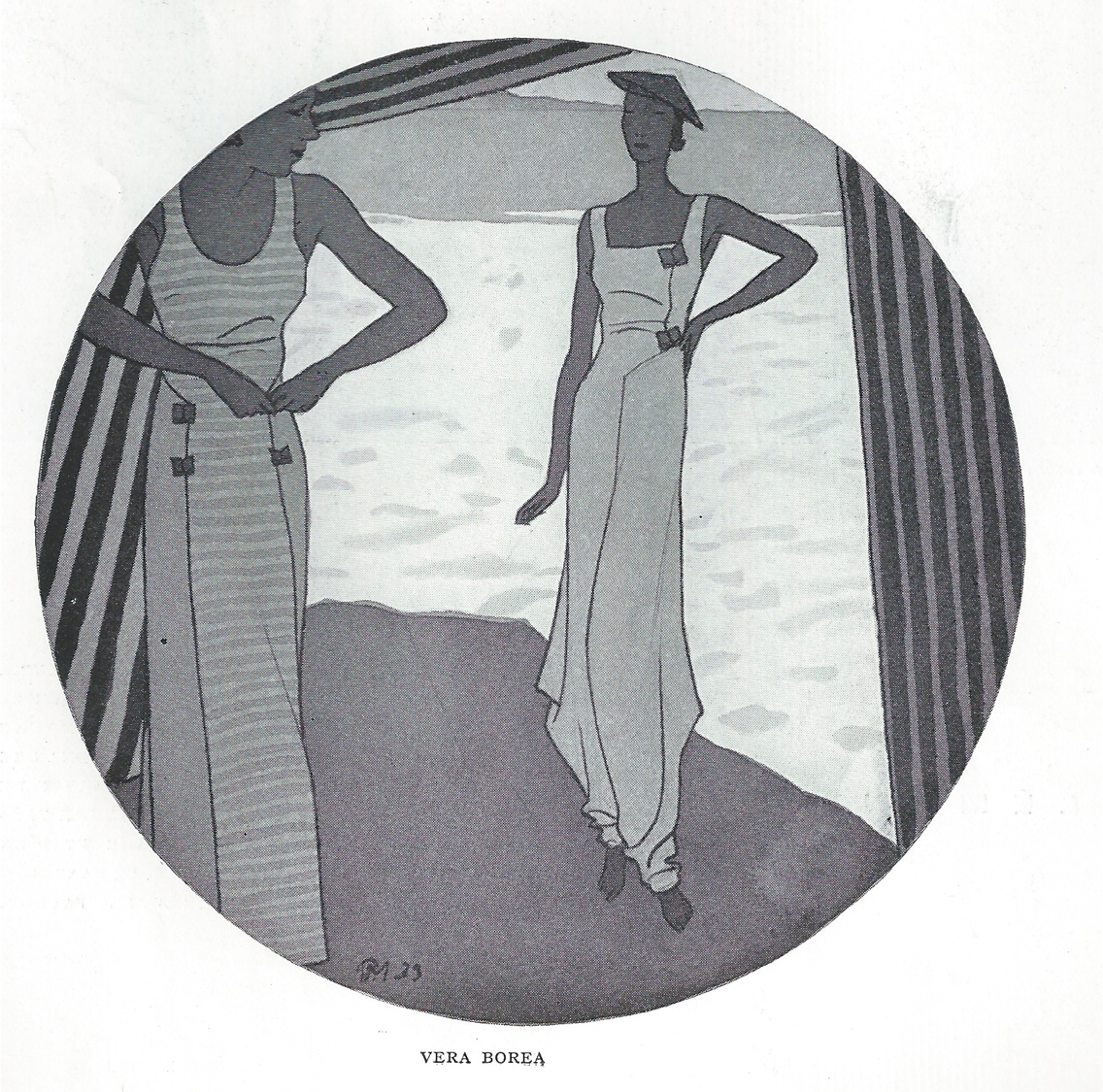
Beach pyjama, 1933

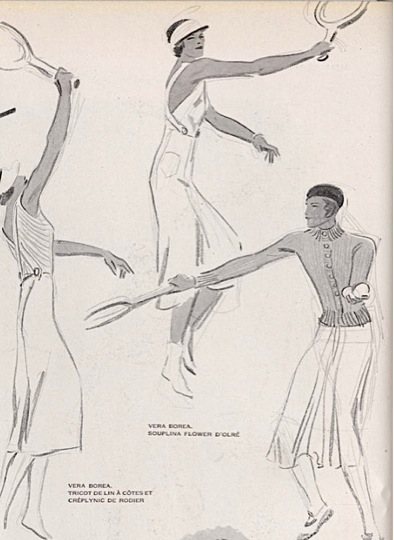
Tennis dresses, 1933

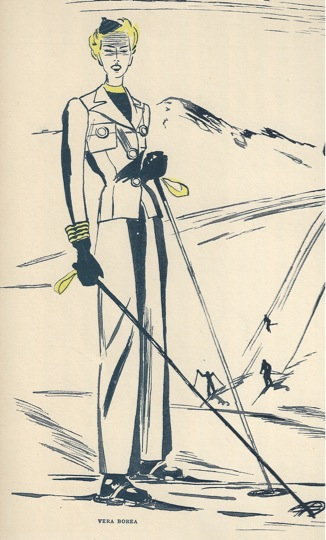
Ski suit, 1937

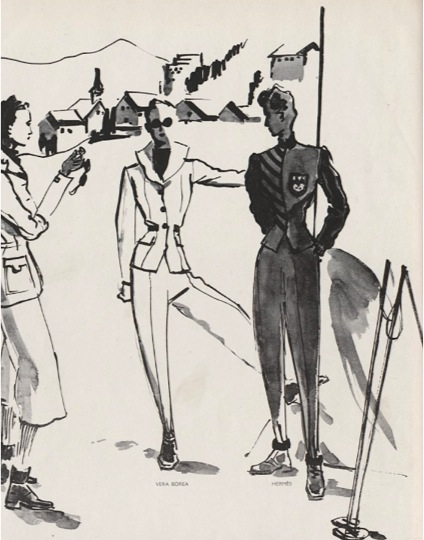
Ski suit for Arosa, 1939

=== A novel approach to elegance: relaxed simplicity, chic in details, gender fluidity ===
Vera Borea brought a sporty aesthetic and integrated the codes of athletic wear. The house started off designing daywear and soon became known for garments that were elegant yet dynamic, stylish yet practical. Her creations often had unusual details that served a practical purpose. Even her evening wear, which she introduced a few seasons later, avoided superfluous details and instead focused on a superb cut, a comfortable fit and excellent workmanship.

In general, the designer favored simple but noble materials like wool, linen, hemp and cotton, often with a textured or nubby surface. Even when she used silk, it was usually in heavy woven patterns, which Vera Borea had made in Italy.

She borrowed liberally from menswear and regularly used wool flannel, tweeds and pinstripes for her women's suits and separates. Even ski ensembles were made of wool flannel and were often shown with an ascot or a tie. Another example of mixing men's and women's codes could be seen in an extraordinary black velvet ski suit that Vera Borea designed in 1933, which looked like a tuxedo and closed with metallic clips that echoed those of a ski boot. The designer re-visited the theme often, like with evening wear she designed in 1945 that sported a tuxedo top and a full skirt like a ballerina's tutu, decades before "le Smoking" burst onto the fashion scene.

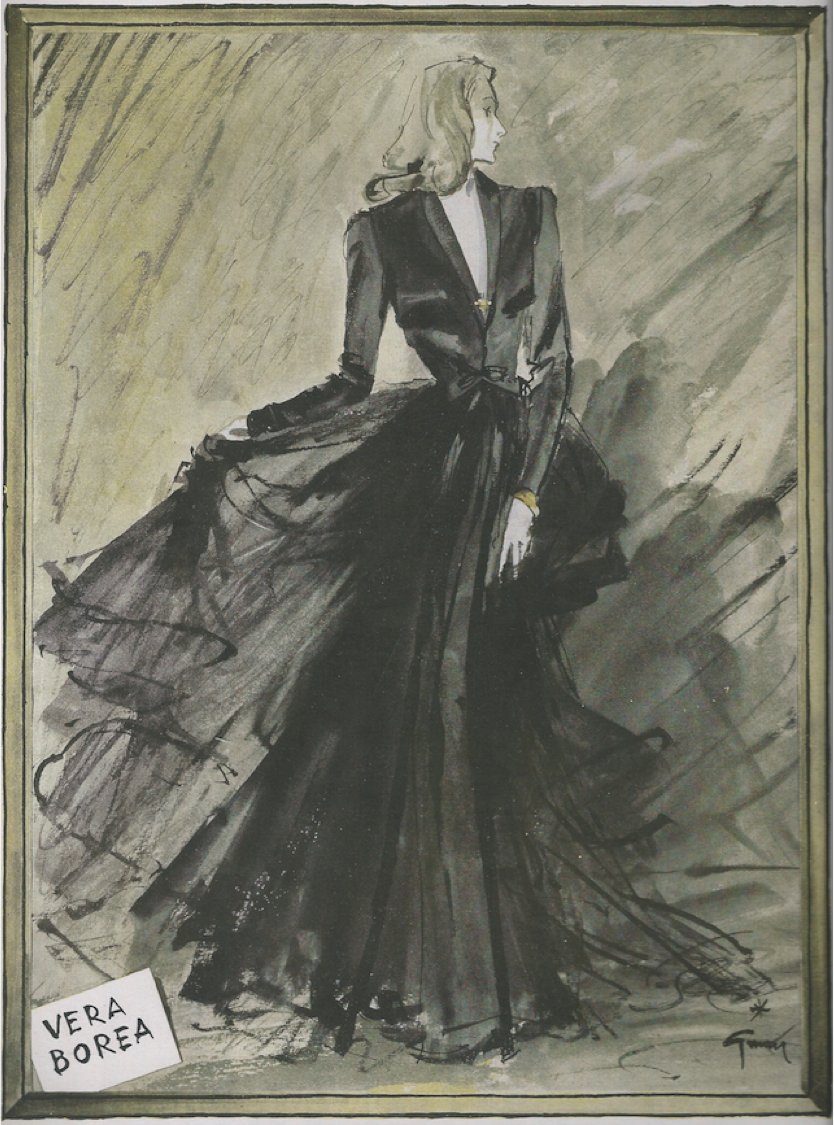
Tuxedo jumpsuit, 1945

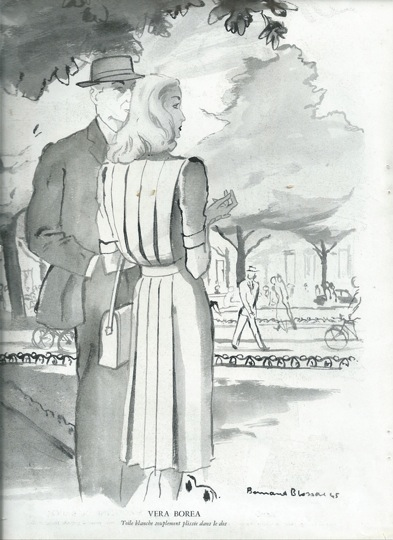
Day dress, 1945

=== Technical innovation ===
A constant desire to explore and innovate permeated Borea's work. She worked out how to weather-proof corduroy and used it for a raincoat. Another raincoat was made of rubber. She spun hemp with silk for travel suits and introduced in France the two-way-stretch elastic fabrics. An evening coat was made of transparent fabric. An aviator jacket was made of supple leather and a knitted back panel, making it wearable both indoors and outdoors. Shoes sported heels made of rubber. Buttons were made of Brazil nuts. Other elements like fur, raffia, rope, bone, nut, feathers, pine cones and leather also showed up in her designs.

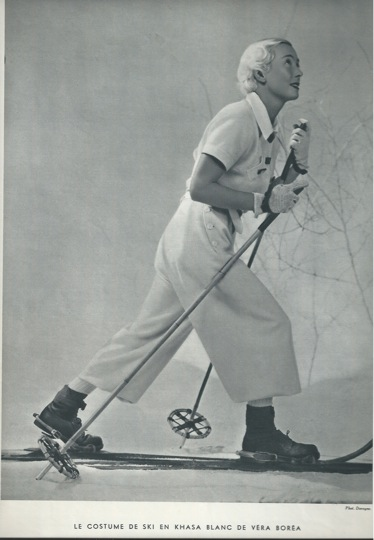
Ski suit in white Khasa, 1934

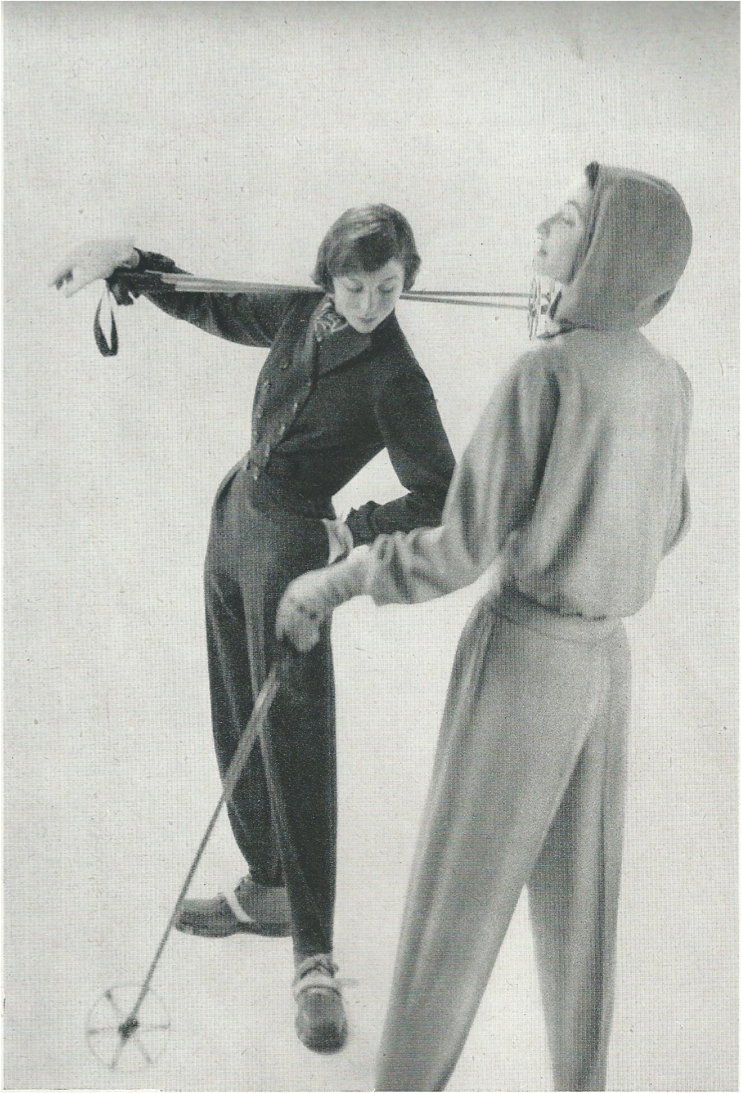
Ski jumpsuit, 1949

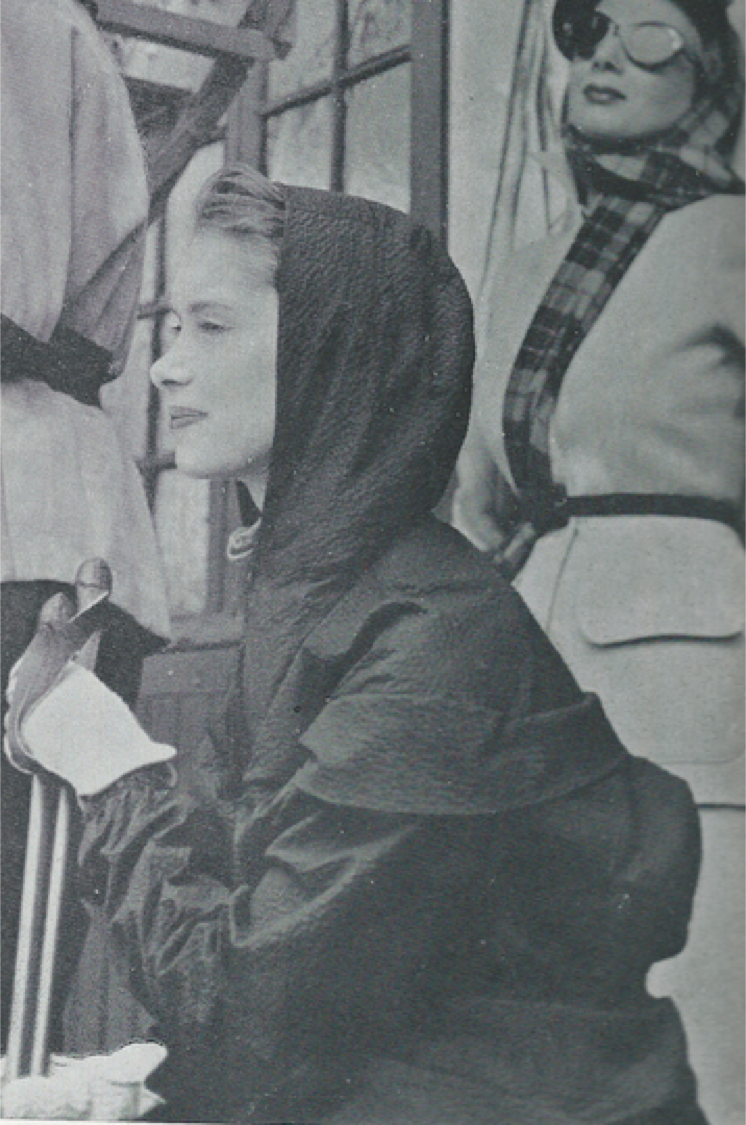
Wind jacket for ski, in Cracknyl fabric, 1949

== Vera Borea designs and aesthetics ==
Modern cuts for a modern lifestyle

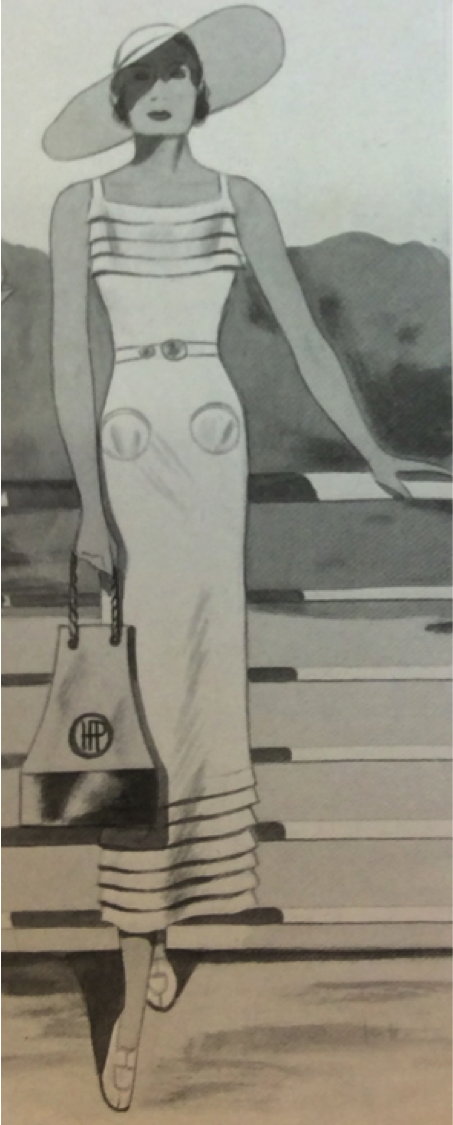
White beach dress, July 1934

Vera Borea's garments were ingenious on both an aesthetic and a practical level. For example, the designer introduced high-waisted pants that skimmed the body from just below the bust down to the waist, with no belt necessary. She lowered the waistline down to the hips for a slimming line. She showed the pants with a bolero, bomber jackets, cropped sweaters or full blouses, which enhanced the elongated effect.

Wrap blouses and dresses did away with a need for zippers, buttons and belts. Halter tops did away with collars. Flared and gored skirts provided fullness and ease of movement while avoiding the stiffness and puffiness of a gathered waistline. Judicious draping on dresses and jackets, inverted pleats on pants, set-in panels; all continued this body-conscious philosophy. Waistbands and cuffs became ribbed and elasticized, offering more comfort and a sleeker line, as well as protection against the elements. Scarves were built into blouses or jackets, or looped through a belt. Short sleeved jackets provided both polish and practicality. Pockets freed up a woman's hands, as did chains and clips, which held a clip-on cigarette case, a visor or a pair of gloves. Collars disappeared from coats and jackets or were shrunk down to a simple stand-up style. Kimono cut coats closed with sashes or one or two oversized buttons. A slim ribbed turtleneck pullover became one with the body and removed the need for a scarf to keep the wearer's throat warm. Thin ribbed pullovers were layered, making them ideal for cool temperatures or outdoor sports, but also easy to peel off once inside for maximum comfort.

Vera Borea also made a mark with her swimsuits, which were often made from plain wool or cotton knits and little ornament. The flair was in the details: low backs, criss-crossing straps, flared hips, discreet patterns. In 1934, she showed swimsuits worn under a matching skirt or flared shorts, giving women a new alternative to the fuller covering of an apron dress. With either option, a woman could simply slip on the skirt, shorts or dress over her swimsuit and go straight to lunch or jump into her car. An apron style sundress with a low back allowed women to soak up the sun's rays on the terrace of a restaurant. Pants got a cargo pocket and jackets incorporated pockets or deeply cuffed sleeves that could hold a swim cap or a wet bathing suit. The beach wear range grew to include sleeveless dresses with matching cotton coats and capri pants, oversized terry cloth lined jackets, high-waisted shorts and bra tops; with matching sandals, socks and beach bags.

=== 1932 ===
Passionate about skiing, swimming and golf, Vera Borea particularly enjoyed designing sportswear because she found it so difficult to buy clothing that was chic yet comfortable and well-priced. Her 1932 sports clothes designs included a skirt and waist-length jacket made of thick woolly tricot. These were worn in combination with an "open work" inside sweater of the same color. A tweed top coat with a black belt and a loose wrap around front gave a harmonious silhouette. Paris fashion releases in the late spring were replete with frocks made of heavy black wool. Borea's black wool crepon frock had an incrusted collar and top sleeves of white shaved lamb. Her summer 1932 fashions emphasized a high-waist effect, even when no belt was worn. The wearer's figure was closely fit from just below her bust to the waist. Vera Borea's day skirts had hemlines from eight to ten inches from the ground. She favored materials which were quite rough and open-surfaced, primarily cotton or woolen ones. These were tailored into small modern suits which were worn with blouses made of dimity or crocheted Irish linen thread. These featured turn down collars and muslin ties. For town wear, Borea stressed rough linen fabrics and she often employed negligee materials in formal fashions. She rarely used silks, but sometimes created heavy basket or chevron (insignia) patterns, which she obtained hand woven from Italy. The youthful designs were without pretense and definitely were not flapperish.

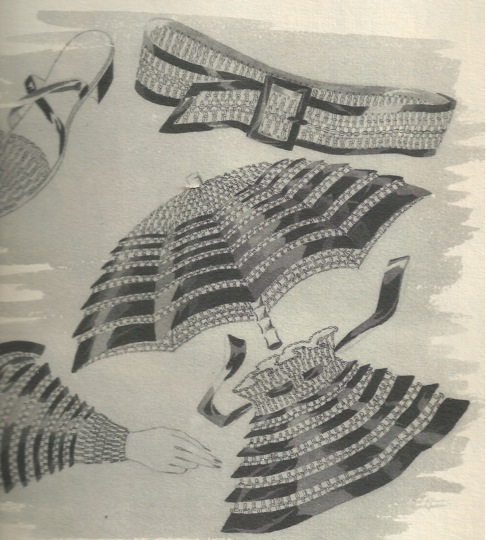
Beach accessories in interwoven rafia and leather, 1935

=== 1933 ===
Summer designs revealed in February 1933 marked a milestone in Vera Borea's designing career. From this point, she no longer showed pants, with the exception of plus fours, which she styled for boating. Her very feminine sports frocks and evening gowns were quite similar, except for their lengths. The frocks were shorter, sixteen inches off the floor, while the evening gowns were ankle-length. Both possessed accentuated sunburn decolletes, suspended from very small ribbon-threaded metal chains. Borea lowered the waistlines of her creations to the hipbone. Her fashions began to exaggerate fullness in overblouses and the wide, flared, gored skirts she designed. Vera Borea's bathing suits were short and flaring, made from plain wool or checked cotton. She created taffeta blouses with linen suits. For spring and summer, Vera Borea used knitted shoulder yokes. A white suede golf jacket she designed had a knitted white cotton yoke. Her mixed wool motor and travel coats featured knitted wool yokes in very dark tones. Her cotton or linen dresses and jackets had yokes with bright contrasts and belts of knitted wool.

=== 1934 ===
A novelty introduced in January 1934 was the skirted bathing suit. A skirt was worn over maillot or flaring one-piece shorts. The separate skirt began to outmode the fuller covering previously given by a beach apron. Vera Borea's "runner" consisted of two flared panels which opened up on both sides. She used a large printed cotton handkerchief, which was popular in St. Tropez. Her creativity showed in the stylishness which she exhibited, working the scarves into new forms to cover backless frocks. Often the skirt was one color, the maillot another, and the wraplet a third. Some favored combinations were dark blue, venetian pink, and pale yellow, or Chinese blue, old rose, and beige.

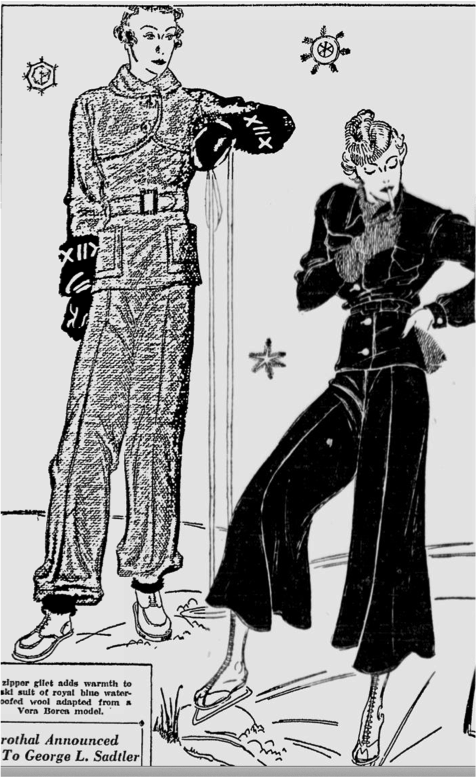
Ski suit in Schenectady Gazette, 1 January 1934

=== 1935 ===
In May 1935, a copy of a Vera Borea sundress sold for $5.95 in a Los Angeles store. Made of cotton Indianhead, the dress left the entire back open to soak in the sun's warmth. It featured a block print with a natural background and a design of green or purple lines. The block print was also adorned with turquoise, gold and coral (color). The sundress was fashionable to wear over a bathing suit for a luncheon indoors at a beach club.

Vera Borea's collection for fall 1935 included suits, jackets and long redingotes, which were semi-fitted with leg-o'-mutton sleeves. Her fashions had a widening shoulder line. Her sports suits were uniquely cut in soft colored tweeds and were worn with dark crape shirts. The short sleeves on these shirts were also widened. Vera Borea's day clothes featured a number of shades of gray-green. These were accentuated with buttons and scarves of yellow or guardsman's red. Bishop violet was a prominent color of Vera Borea's evening wear designs. A nubby woolen, woven with bear's hair, was featured in the designer's sports wear. Her wool daytime frocks had velvet belts and trimmings. Highlights included pine-cone rosettes, which replaced sports buttons. Pheasant feathers were exhibited as trimming.

=== 1936 ===
In July, Vera Borea released a white flannel suit especially for the "sea-cum-casino". Worn with a chali blouse, it had subtle differences from suits introduced by Lucien Lelong and other designers.

=== 1938 ===
Vera Borea' silhouette was characterized by moulded bodices, normal shoulders, small waists, and short skirts, with some of them pleated and others slightly flared. She often made use of linens for beach, town, and evening wear. She frequently employed an apronline, which was either draped or tied in the back. Other prominent features of note were striped and embroidered materials (often oriental types), and colored piping (sewing). Her colorful printed frocks were worn beneath slim, dark coats.

=== 1939 ===
For fall 1939, Vera Borea styled striped necktie wool dresses. Her daytime frocks were worn with necktie wool blouses and heavy leather belts. Wool jackets were shown with plain skirts. Full skirted dresses with shirtwaist bodices were a part of her evening wear. One design was made in red and green vertical stripes. It tucked in at the waist. Her evening gowns were inspired from portraits by Velasquez. The features included long sleeves and gold buttons, with modern shirtwaist effects.

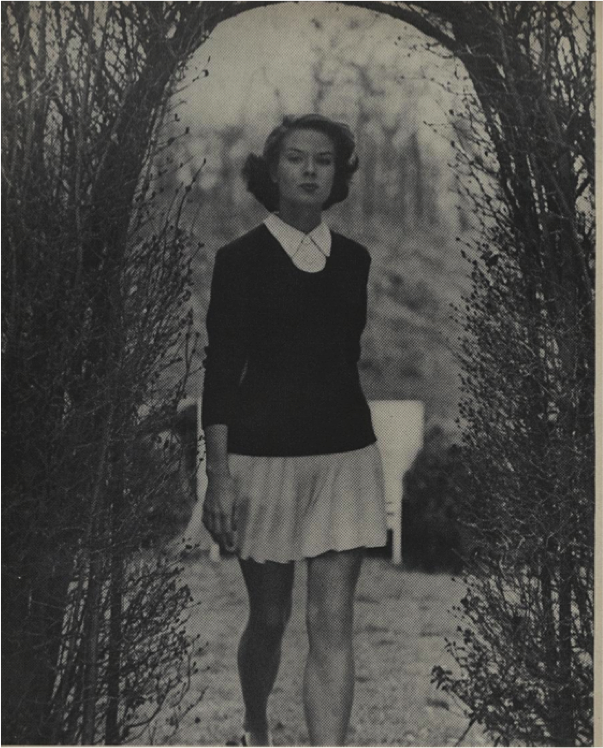
Tennis suit, 1948

=== 1940 ===
Flared basques were created by Vera Borea for wear in the evenings. Her styles displayed screw-head buttons with a contrasting color on a square cut jacket. The look was very individual.

=== 1946 ===
Vera Borea's 1946 fall collection was presented on 12 September at her Paris salon, which had been redecorated with white and red and massed with red flowers. The lines of her clothing designs were simple, with natural shoulders. Fullness was eschewed except for drapery featured on a slim silhouette for evening. Among her fashions at the showing included a gray flannel ski suit with white leather suspenders and gold buckles. Vera Borea introduced amber, mouse gray and moss green corduroy box jackets over tweed suits or simple turtleneck wool dresses. Her town dresses and suits employed black wool bands or were inset with black velvet. Perhaps her most attractive ensemble in the collection was a mouse gray jacket with a plum frock.

=== 1959 ===
Vera Borea designed a raincoat made from golden brown proofed corduroy. Its buttons were of embossed silver.
