= Noracon =

NORACON (NORth European and Austrian CONsortium) is a consortium member of the SJU PPP that is managing the Research & Development (R&D) phase of the Single European Sky ATM Research (SESAR) Programme .

== Overview ==
NORACON aims at participation in the SESAR project thus developing the future ATM systems according to the ATM master plan.

Among the activities are:

- i4D operation - giving improved correlation between airborne FMS and ground predicted trajectories
- Remote and virtual tower - e.g. allowing TWR ATCO to work for multiple airports

== Legal basis ==
A consortium agreement defines how these close competitors will work together under the SESAR project.

== Funding and Budget ==
NORACON is taking part in the 700M€ industrial share of the SJU PPP.

== Members ==
The members of the NORACON Consortium are:

- Austro Control
- Avinor
- EANS
- Finavia
- IAA
- Isavia
- LFV
- Naviair
- Swedavia
