= List of Beyond Reality episodes =

The following is a list of episodes of the Canadian-American science fiction television series Beyond Reality which originally aired between October 4, 1991, and March 20, 1993. The series is about two university parapsychologists (Shari Belafonte and Carl Marotte) who investigate reports of paranormal phenomena that occur in ordinary people's lives.

== Series overview ==
| Season | Episodes | Originally released | |
| Season | Episodes | First released | Last released |
|---|---|---|---|
| 1 | 20 | October 4, 1991 | May 29, 1992 |
| 2 | 24 | September 19, 1992 | March 20, 1993 |

== Episodes ==
=== Season 1 (1991–92) ===
| No. overall | No. in season | Title | Directed by | Written by | Original release date |
|---|---|---|---|---|---|
| 1 | 1 | "Mirror, Mirror" | Allan Kroeker | Robin Bernheim, James Kahn | October 4, 1991 |
Anna, a student of J.J.’s, has learned how to enter another etheric plane – by crossing through her bedroom mirror into an alternate world where her romantic fantasies about J.J. are real. This other world turns dangerous when Anna is unable to find her way back. Laura hypnotizes J.J., allowing him to join Anna on the etheric plane and guide her back to reality.
| 2 | 2 | "The Doppelganger" | Mario Azzopardi | James Kahn | October 11, 1991 |
Joe Revere is being terrified by horrible, violent nightmares. Laura and J.J. discover that Revere's got a double, an exact twin who is a cop on the graveyard shift. The cop's intense, deeply repressed fears have created the "double" – whose "nightmares" are the cop's real life. Laura and J.J. persuade Revere to confront the double – and his innermost fears – head- on to resolve this.
| 3 | 3 | "Miracle Worker" | Graeme Campbell | Melinda Bell | October 18, 1991 |
Anthony is a psychic healer whose "gift" is fading; he's been taking on the illnesses of those he cures. Laura and J.J. recommend that Anthony rest and "recharge", but Anthony is desperate to cure his dying father, Bill. During the healing, instead of allowing his illness to transfer to Anthony, Bill takes Anthony's illnesses into himself, ensuring his own death – but also cleansing his son of disease and restoring his gift.
| 4 | 4 | "Return Visit" | Allan Kroeker | Ira Steven Behr | October 25, 1991 |
Jenny, a teenage runaway, has had a vision of her long-lost mother, Barbara, in which Barbara told Jenny she was returning. Obeying Barbara's instructions to "follow her instincts", Jenny travels thousands of miles to a city she's never seen – and miraculously finds her estranged father, Gil. Laura and J.J. suspect Barbara's mysterious disappearance ten years ago may have been a UFO abduction, but Gil refuses to believe it. And then Barbara does appear…to say goodbye to Jenny – and to take Gil with her.
| 5 | 5 | "Intimate Shadows" | Jorge Montesi | Alan Fine | November 1, 1991 |
Miriam, a librarian, is being haunted by a ghost. Laura and J.J. discover the apparition is Frederic – Miriam's husband – who left her years ago. Miriam is shocked to discover Frederic is not dead, but is a filthy, drunken bum who has been using astral projection – out of body travel – to watch the woman he still loves but hasn't dared approach. Ashamed at Miriam's having seen him as he is, Frederic flees. To find him, Miriam induces her own out of body experience – a dangerous move. But Miriam's demonstration of caring convinces Frederic of her friendship and forgiveness…and gives him motivation to put his life back in order.
| 6 | 6 | "Echoes of Evil" | René Bonnière | Gordon Farr | TBA |
Laura and J.J. discover that Dave, a thirty-year-old man, believes he is the reincarnation of Otto Leider, a WWII concentration camp commandant – and is carrying out a perverted mission of killing camp survivors. Using hypnotic regression, Laura and J.J. show Dave his past life: Dave "sees" Leider being accosted by a prisoner who claims to be his mother; when the woman offers proof, Leider shoots her. The knowledge that his hero Leider was actually a coward who murdered his Jewish mother is more than Dave can bear – his mind snaps, leaving him catatonic.
| 7 | 7 | "Range of Motion" | Eleanore Lindo | Marc Scott Zicree | November 15, 1991 |
Tom Becker, a paraplegic, finds that his paralyzed limbs are moving…which is medically impossible. Tom's wife, Maggie, suspects it may be unconscious telekinesis, direct mind control. But Laura and J.J. find it's actually Tom's assistant Kathy, killed in the subway accident which paralyzed Tom, who's taking control of Tom's motions, pulling him against his will to the site of the accident. As a train approaches, Tom's sure Kathy's brought him here for revenge…but Kathy's ghost tells Tom she loves him and wants him to join her. Tom must decline – he loves Maggie and is happy with his life despite being paralyzed – and Kathy disappears, moving Tom clear of the track just as the train thunders past.
| 8 | 8 | "The Cold" | Allan Eastman | Ralph Phillips | November 22, 1991 |
Sharon's having terrifying visions of her dead ex-husband Paul trapped in a cave of ice. Laura and J.J. discover that Paul's body was cryogenically frozen after death. Sharon can't convince Paul's then-current wife Natalie that Paul's consciousness is somehow alive and in pain. Laura and J.J. use biofeedback techniques to make Natalie receptive to telepathic images, and Natalie sees Paul – asking Natalie to let him die. Natalie terminates the contract and has Paul's body buried, allowing Paul to pass on.
| 9 | 9 | "The Bridge" | Gilbert M. Shilton | Hans Beimler; Richard Manning | November 29, 1991 |
Michael, a troubled boy of twelve, is seeing the ghost of his father, Frank, who died in an auto accident on a bridge. Michael misses Frank desperately and wants to join him. When Michael is critically injured, Laura and J.J. urge his mother to overcome her fears, go to the bridge and speak to Frank's ghost. The mother tells Frank that it's not yet Michael's time; Frank, knowing she's right, "speaks" to the near-death Michael and persuades him to fight for his life.
| 10 | 10 | "That Old Black Magic" | Jorge Montesi | James Kahn | December 6, 1991 |
Eric, a young lawyer, is having bouts of extreme pain with no known cause. Laura and J.J. find that Eric's girlfriend Angie secretly gave a lock of Eric's hair to Dominique, a co-worker who offered to prepare a Voodoo love potion. But Dominique, jilted in the past by Eric, is using her black magic to torture Eric – and Angie as well. To save Angie and himself, Eric has to confront Dominique and turn her own magic against her.
| 11 | 11 | "Enemy in Our Midst" | Allan Kroeker | Melinda Snodgrass | December 14, 1991 |
Cody, sixteen, is having frightening prophetic visions of his mother Diana being killed by her new husband John. While Laura and J.J. are investigating, Diana narrowly escapes serious injury from an accident that Cory accurately foresaw. Laura and J.J. discover that Cory himself is telekinetically causing the accidents without realizing it. To stop the accidents and Diana, Laura and J.J. must get Cory to face his own demons – to confront his unconscious hostility toward Diana for marrying John and "betraying" his father.
| 12 | 12 | "Asylum" | Bruce Pittman | Marc Scott Zicree | December 20, 1991 |
Mitchell, a geologist, has been taken over by the personality of Fountain Gibbs, a slave from 1858. Mitchell's been institutionalized; when Laura and J.J. come to interview him to determine if this might be a case of channeling or reincarnation, Fountain/Mitchell takes Laura hostage and escapes. But Mitchell's personality isn't gone – rather, Fountain must constantly suppress it in order to stay in control of Mitchell's body. Though Fountain is certain that if he returns to 1858 he'll die, Laura convinces Fountain that being a slavemaster (by suppressing Mitchell) is as bad as being a slave. Fountain returns to 1858 – but manages to reach a free state and survive.
| 13 | 13 | "Killer Instinct" | Randy Bradshaw | Richard Manning | December 27, 1991 |
Cindy, a doctoral student of Laura and J.J.’s, is doing an experiment which attempts to link human minds with animal minds through hypnosis. It succeeds with Rex, who mind-links with a wolf in the wild, seeing what it sees and feeling what it feels as it kills a rabbit. Rex discovers he enjoys this vicarious killing and begins controlling the wolf's actions to attack larger prey – including Cindy when she threatens to stop the experiment. J.J., playing on Rex's hypnotic suggestibility, manages to loosen Rex's control over the wolf – which turns against its telepathic "master" and kills him.
| 14 | 14 | "Sins of the Father" | Bruce Pittman | Alison Lea Bingeman | April 17, 1992 |
When ten-year-old Tina starts having frightening, recurring visions of a woman apparently being murdered, her mother Kris seeks Laura and J.J.’s help, certain her daughter is seeing a future event that can perhaps be prevented. But Tina's father Bill is adamant that these "visions" are just bad dreams. His motives are called into question, though, when Tina sees him hiding a bracelet that the woman in her vision was wearing. When Laura and J.J. try to analyze Tina's visions, Bill turns violent and takes her away from Laura and J.J. Soon Tina is lost in her visions, at first trying to dig up what might be a body buried in the basement, then almost falling off the roof in a re-creation of them woman's death. Laura and J.J. tell her frantic parents the only way to save Tina is for Kris to psychically walk her through the vision – because these images are coming not from Tina, but from her mother.
| 15 | 15 | "Nightmare Without End" | Bruce Pittman | Richard Manning | April 22, 1992 |
After raping his coworker Sheila, Ryan finds that, by returning to the scene of the crime and meditating, he can psychically force Sheila to repeatedly relive the attack. Unable to return to work for fear of Ryan and with no one to believe her, Sheila comes to Laura, her former teacher. They find there's little that can be done in the real world – when J.J. questions him, Ryan claims Sheila is a mental case. Realizing the only way to stop the attacks is for Sheila to fight back on the psychic plane, Laura teaches her self-defense and confronting Ryan she kills him.
| 16 | 16 | "Master of Darkness" | Mario Azzopardi | James Kahn | May 1, 1992 |
High-achiever Jennifer lets slip to Laura that her grades have been dropping lately due to the time she's spending in a role-playing game she's involved in with some other students. When Jennifer and a second student are reported missing, Laura questions the other players, who react with suspicion. A clue leads Laura and J.J. to a university basement at midnight, where masked students sit playing the Game. The room-filing incense proves to be a drug; soon Laura and J.J. find themselves transported into "Darkworld" – a hellish, medieval realm where the students are wild, masked creatures. Laura and J.J. are forced to be players in the Game, ruled over by the Sorcerer.
| 17 | 17 | "Siren Song" | Mario Azzopardi | Marc Scott Zicree | May 8, 1992 |
J.J. falls for Emma Moreland, a visiting British professor using Laura and J.J.’s database of the paranormal to study siren myths through the ages. But Laura turns up some disturbing oddities about Emma's research: she's focusing on Tanit, and ancient demon who killed men with a kiss of fire – and on modern killings that seem to mirror this exact method of death. Fearing Emma may be chasing a real-life monster, J.J. confronts her, only to learn that Emma's certain she's possessed by this demon, which transforms her when she's asleep.
| 18 | 18 | "Justice" | René Bonnière | Robin Bernheim | May 15, 1992 |
After experiencing astral projection during a beating from a sadistic prison guard, death row convict Stan Ortega invites Laura and J.J. to study the phenomenon. J. J., back when he was a psychotherapist, examined Ortega during his trial and testified Ortega was sane…though J.J. also came to believe in Ortega's innocence. Now Ortega hopes they can help him control these projections, so he can leave his body before begin electrocuted. Initial hypnosis sessions suggest to Laura and J.J. that Ortega is astral projecting, but their complaints to the warden about the beatings only serve to bring on another attack upon Ortega from the guard Hatch. Dispirited, Ortega confides to Laura and J.J. that Hatch committed the murder for which Ortega is now to be executed.
| 19 | 19 | "The Fire Within" | René Bonnière | Anne-Marie MacDonald | May 22, 1992 |
After Susan Tong sees her headstrong young brother Jimmy stick his hand in a flame without getting burned, she contacts Laura, who used to baby-sit the two of them and was a Godsend when their parents died. Jimmy has recently joined a street gang…and become obsessed with Chinese mysticism. When Laura tries to talk to Jimmy he erupts in anger then shows her his power – slashing himself with a knife and them healing the wound. Later when Jimmy is confronted by a rival gang member, he defeats the man by summoning up an ancient Chinese warrior. But the warrior-spirit runs amok, killing the gang member. Laura and J.J. piece it together – the same Chinese symbol burned into the forehead of the victim appeared on Jimmy's hand when he slashed himself. Laura reveals to Jimmy that the symbol is that of Nie Zheng, an ancient assassin who Jimmy is apparently channeling. Jimmy admits he called upon the spirits of his ancestors to give him strength, but had no idea it would end in murder.
| 20 | 20 | "The Color of Mad" | Eleanor Lindo | Robert Forsyth | May 29, 1992 |
While walking by a showing of paintings by Dan Barker – all blurry details of a single monstrous creature – Elizabeth Wade is horrified to see the pictures moving, a clawed hand reaching out of the canvas. She goes berserk and destroys one of the paintings, then runs off into the night. Later, Laura and J.J. find her huddled in their office. Elizabeth is a former patient of J.J.’s, a schizophrenic who once believed she was the sole human in the world ruled by a monster named Pit. Medication and J.J.’s guidance helped her out of madness, but now she claims that Dan is painting Pit by somehow looking into her mind! J.J. discovers the paintings do bear an uncanny resemblance to Elizabeth's former hallucinations and her ability to guess the details of works Dan has shown no one further suggest there's a psychic line between them. Elizabeth pleads with Dan to destroy the paintings – if he continues, she feels sure he too will go mad.

=== Season 2 (1992–93) ===
| No. overall | No. in season | Title | Directed by | Written by | Original release date |
|---|---|---|---|---|---|
| 21 | 1 | "The Burning Judge" | Allan Kroeker | Gordon Farr | September 19, 1992 |
Roxanne, a fraudulent "psychic and reader" has a nightmare of being burned at the stake by a grim 17th Century zealot. Then she awakens to find the same man nosing around her shop and accusing her of being a witch. Laura and J.J. discover that both Roxanne and the man are reincarnated from 300 years ago, at which time the man – Jebadiah Smith – had had sex with her, then felt so guilty he killed her in a witch-hunt. When the present-day Jebadiah kidnaps Roxanne and Laura in order to burn them both, they confront Jebadiah with this knowledge, causing Jebadiah to spontaneously combust in shame and horror before he's able to repeat the original sin.
| 22 | 2 | "Theatre of the Absurd" | Randy Bradshaw | Phil Bedard; Larry Lalonde | September 26, 1992 |
Celia, Laura and J.J's spunky young teaching assistant, is dying to escape her mundane duties and do some paranormal field research. She gets her chance when actress Dianne Bolton shows up, mistakes Celia for a professor, and asks for help with a ghost which is haunting their play rehearsals. At the theatre, Celia meets brainless, untalented leading man Brett, pompous director Nigel and shy young stagehand Kevin – and saves Brett's life when the ghost tries to drop a spotlight batten on him.
| 23 | 3 | "Woman of His Dreams" | Eleanore Lindo | Jeremy Lipp | October 3, 1992 |
Richard DeVries, a surgeon (and former flame of Laura's) is stealing psychic energy from his patients in order to buy the sexual favours of an astral spirit. Laura must offer up her own soul to the spirit in a desperate attempt to persuade DeVries to break his deadly addiction.
| 24 | 4 | "Nightfall" | Eleanore Lindo | Marc Scott Zicree | October 10, 1992 |
Miranda, an eight-year-old girl has the telepathic ability to pull J.J. – against his will – into her own mental universe: a park where the approaching night brings terrors. Laura and J.J. discover that these telepathic emanations are actually being unconsciously sent out by a desperate, lonely, old woman who is dying.
| 25 | 5 | "Dancing with the Man" | Allan Kroeker | Hans Beimler | October 17, 1992 |
Laura is critically injured in an automobile accident and has a near-death experience in which she's a 1930's nightclub singer who's being seduced by a mysterious, devastatingly handsome man. To bring Laura back, J.J. must enter Laura's fantasy and lure her away from the man – who is death himself.
| 26 | 6 | "The Dying of the Light" | Allan Kroeker | Richard Manning | October 24, 1992 |
Nolan Randolph, a distinguished, fifty-ish professor of philosophy, is having violent, life threatening seizures which appear to be demonic possession. J.J., who has long idolized Randolph's compassion and intelligence, is determined to exorcise this demon…no matter what the personal risk. And when he discovers that this demon is not at all what it seems, J.J. has to choose between perpetuating a grave injustice – or allowing his mentor to die.
| 27 | 7 | "A Kiss is Just a Psi" | Randy Bradshaw | James Kahn | October 31, 1992 |
Dozing off in class, student Tom Fairbanks has a precognitive dream in which his teacher Laura is murdered in a hotel. When Tom learns that Laura is on her way to the same hotel in real life – to debunk a psychic who intends to defraud a widow – Tom follows Laura in order to "save" her. Realizing Tom has a crush on her, Laura pooh-poohs Tom's actions – until elements of Tom's dream begin coming true.
| 28 | 8 | "Late for Dinner" | Randy Bradshaw | Robert Forsyth | November 7, 1992 |
Laura and J.J. investigate suspected poltergeist activity in the house of the MacAstors, an upper-class family whose bitter infighting is taking its toll on twelve-year-old son Luke. Luke maintains that the strange telekinetic events are being caused by Edward – a short, brutish man that only Luke can see – but his parents won't listen; they're convinced Luke is merely telling tall tales of an imaginary playfriend. When Edward's antics turn from prankish to dangerous Laura and J.J. must persuade Luke to stop his "friend" from taking revenge on the MacAstors.
| 29 | 9 | "Where There's Smoke..." | Ken Girotti | Ralph Phillips | November 14, 1992 |
Laura and J.J. journey to a remote forest to investigate the disappearance of an archaeologist who'd been searching for hidden gold of a gypsy queen's dowry reputedly being guarded by an evil spirit. The spirit, it turns out, does exist – and is a shape-shifter that can appear as any member of the expedition. The shape shifter attempts to turn people against one another; Laura and J.J. must expose its impersonations and break the cycle of violence before they are all killed.
| 30 | 10 | "Demon in the Flame" | Ken Girotti | Ralph Phillips | November 21, 1992 |
Young female firefighter Becky Fullman has the psychic ability to detect a fire even far across town. In evaluating her ability, Laura and J.J find that Becky is also haunted by visions of a "fire monster" – a sense that fire is somehow alive and malevolent – which compels Becky to take suicidal chances in her obsessive need to extinguish fires. Laura and J.J. must get to the root of these menacing visions which, including Becky's judgement, are endangering not only Becky but her co-workers as well.
| 31 | 11 | "A Mind of Their Own" | Stefan Scaini | Robin Bernheim | December 5, 1992 |
Laura enters her office one night to find three teenagers ransacking her files for information on telepathy. Seeing Laura, the teens mentally "join forces" and traumatically erase Laura's memory of them. J.J. uses hypnosis to restore Laura's memory; they investigate and find that the teens have combined their individual telepathic talents to form a "group mind". One teen, Jamie, becomes frightened by the Mind's misuse of its power and comes to Laura and J.J. for help getting out. Laura and J.J. must then defend Jamie against the mental assaults of the Mind as it attempts to force Jamie back into the fold.
| 32 | 12 | "Final Flight" | Stefan Scaini | Judith and Garfield Reeves-Stevens | December 12, 1992 |
During a spacewalk, a shuttle astronaut apparently contracts some sort of alien virus that is slowly killing him. When he also manifests odd psi abilities, J.J. is called in as a consultant. But while J.J. and the astronaut are being flown in a military transport jet to a medical facility, the astronaut goes berserk and breaks free of his glass-booth quarantine – exposing J.J. to the "virus"… unless J.J. can determine the actual cause of the astronaut's strange disease. The air force colonel, under orders to prevent the virus from spreading at all costs, will detonate a nuclear bomb and destroy the plane.
| 33 | 13 | "Facing the Wall" | Allan Kroeker | James Kahn | December 19, 1992 |
Meek Alec Shore finds himself drifting more and more often into a strange, frightening dream world – a Kafka-esque totalitarian bureaucracy where everyone wears faceless masks and has numbers instead of names. When Alec permanently slips into this nightmare reality, J.J. must go in after him by becoming a character in Alec's dream – a spy who must smuggle Alec out of his captivity and "over the wall" to freedom.
| 34 | 14 | "Inner Ear" | Allan Kroeker | Richard Manning | January 9, 1993 |
Celia samples an experimental drug that gives the taker telepathic abilities. At first she has great fun reading people's minds – contrasting what people are saying with what they're really thinking. But the power becomes deadly when Celia finds she can't turn it off – and the mental voices of all the minds around her become a painful, sanity-threatening cacophony. Laura and J.J. must find a way to break through the noise before it pushes Celia into insanity or suicide.
| 35 | 15 | "Dead Air" | Stefan Scaini | Durnford King | January 16, 1993 |
Celia, a fan of the scary, lights out-type radio stories told by campus DJ Mason Driscoll, begins to suspect that the Crusher, the maniacal killer in Driscoll's tales, is actually coming to life and murdering people. When Celia and Laura convince Driscoll of this, he tries to relate a story in which The Crusher dies – only to have the Crusher show up and kill him before he finishes the story. It's up to Laura to take over the mike and put an end to the Crusher – before he puts an end to her.
| 36 | 16 | "Let's Play House" | Stefan Scaini | David Bennett Carren; J. Larry Carroll | January 23, 1993 |
Robert "Wally" Wallace loves the Fifties – so much so that whenever he hears the song "Sea of Love" he transports himself into an Ozzie and Harriet style Fifties world. When Celia inadvertently joins him in his fantasy universe, Wally sees her as Donna, his perfect Fifties wife, and is determined to keep her in his dream world forever. To rescue Celia, Laura and J.J. must also enter Wally's world, taking on various comical Fifties personae of their own (maid, beatnik, civil defense worker, FBI man) in order to break Wally's grip on the universe and return them to reality.
| 37 | 17 | "The Loving Cup" | Bruce Pittman | James Kahn | January 30, 1993 |
At an estate auction, Laura, J.J., Celia and Tom Fairbanks run into Swami Raku, who's planning to run a scam on rich, stuffy matron Margaret Dupar. The scam involves the purchase of a crystal chalice which supposedly acts as a magical "love potion". What no one realizes is that the chalice actually does work – anyone who reads its inscription falls instantly in love with the first person they look at. What ensues is a bedroom farce in which Celia falls for Tom, Mrs. Dupar for J.J., Laura and the swami with each other, and J.J. with himself. It's up to Tom to find a way to break the spell before these dangerous liaisons go too far.
| 38 | 18 | "The Passion" | Bruce Pittman | Marc Scott Zicree | February 6, 1993 |
A mysterious stranger brings J.J. the century-old journal of Doctor Jeremiah Baker, J.J.’s great grandfather. As the stranger reads it, we see Baker's story unfold in England of 1888: Mr. Winter has brought his young, gravely ill wife Mrs. Winter (played by Celia) to Dr. Baker (played by J.J.) for help. A West Indian woman, Ariel (played by Laura), tries to warn Baker that Mrs. Winter's "sickness" is the result of a vampire's bite, but Baker refuses to believe it – until Mrs. Winter succumbs to her illness, dies, and later returns to Baker as a vampire. Mrs. Winter is about to bite Baker when Ariel drives a stake through Mrs. Winter's heart. Baker and Ariel join forces: Baker wants to find a cure for vampirism, but Ariel wants only revenge against the monster who, years ago, killed her daughter.
| 39 | 19 | "Forget Me Not" | Unknown | Judith and Garfield Reeves-Stevens | February 13, 1993 |
Dr. Monica Harris, a psychotherapist and former colleague of J.J.’s, has invented a form of electroshock therapy which can literally remove memories from patients’ minds. But J.J. discovers that Monica can replay and relive these stolen memories…and she's become addicted to these vicarious experiences. When J.J. accuses her of misusing her technique, Monica removes J.J.’s memory and incarcerates him in the mental hospital she heads. Although J.J. doesn't recognize or remember Laura and Celia, Laura has to convince J.J. that Monica's "therapy" is dangerous for both J.J. and Monica, and that J.J. must resist Monica's further attempts to plunder his memories.
| 40 | 20 | "Face-Off" | Unknown | Unknown | February 20, 1993 |
Ed Novick wants his teenage son Bobby to be more aggressive on the hockey rink and emulate Ed's hero, pro-hockey player George Potter. When Ed gives Potter's championship jersey to Bobby to wear on the ice, Bobby becomes possessed by Potter's ghost – and begins playing dirty, almost crippling his opponents. Bobby's personality also changes: the once obedient boy is now rebellious and combative off the ice as well. Laura and J.J. must persuade Ed to attempt to reach Bobby and in doing so, Ed finds he must confront the hostile, dangerous spirit of George Potter.
| 41 | 21 | "Keepsake" | Unknown | Unknown | February 27, 1993 |
It's 1968. The happiness of young, newly married Cassie and John Woodbridge is shattered when John dies of a cerebral hemorrhage. But then, John finds himself in the present day, with no memory of who he is nor where he's from. Via hypnosis, Laura gleans John's name and address; she takes John to his home. Cassie is there, older by twenty-five years, but John doesn't remember her. Later, Laura and J.J. learn that John died in 1968 and that his body was disinterred three days earlier by Cassie. Moreover, Laura is feeling drained and weak; somehow, the reanimated John is drawing out Laura's life force. Meanwhile, Cassie has finally reawakened John's memory of her; she confesses that she brought John back from the dead. Laura and J.J. arrive, demanding Cassie undo the spell.
| 42 | 22 | "The Box" | Allan Kroeker | Judith and Garfield Reeves-Stevens | March 6, 1993 |
Following a parapsychology conference, Laura, J.J., and Celia return to their guests: Andrew, an obnoxious grad student; Gregory, an anthropologist; and Diane, Gregory's wife and Laura's longtime friend. On Laura's desk is a strangely marked box that wasn't there before. When Andrew opens the box it vanishes. And outside all the office doors and windows is a thick, mysterious fog. Gregory and Diane attempt to leave the office – and a moment later, Diane runs back in, bleeding and hysterical: in the fog is a monster that attacked her and killed Gregory. The phones are dead; Celia tries to get help via the computer link but the computer screen instead displays: "You have let me out. Find the box in one hour – or you must take my place inside." But the box is nowhere to be found.
| 43 | 23 | "Reunion" | Unknown | J. Larry Carroll | March 13, 1993 |
In a sleep-deprivation-induced astral projection, J.J. finds himself in 1943 – occupying the dead body of "Harvard" Hansen, a WWII correspondent, on a submarine under attack. In charge of the forward torpedo room is Mike Stillman – J.J.’s father who abandoned J.J.’s family when J.J. was twelve. The projection lasts only briefly – and J.J. returns to the present. Later, J.J.’s research tells him that the submarine was sunk by depth charges but managed to surface due to Hansen's help. Knowing that Hansen died before he could have helped raise the sub, J.J. induces another astral projection in order to return to the sub, again occupy Hansen's body and do what he can so his dad will survive to father him.
| 44 | 24 | "Bloodstone" | Unknown | Unknown | March 20, 1993 |
Sinclair, leader of a cult called the Cabal of the First Circle, claims to possess magical powers. When Laura expresses skepticism about that – and is quoted as such in a newspaper article – Sinclair sets out to convert and brainwash Laura through a campaign of fear. Sinclair wears a "magical" bloodstone crystal around his neck; during an incantation, the bloodstone glows – and Laura finds herself pulled into a nightmare world where Sinclair preys upon her deepest fear: drowning. Laura, genuinely terrorized, is gradually losing her grip on sanity. J.J. surmises that Sinclair's powers aren't "magic" at all, that the bloodstone crystal serves as a lens to focus and intensify Sinclair's telepathic ability. J.J. hypnotizes Laura to try to remove the traumatic childhood memory of drowning that Sinclair is using, but the memory is planted too deep; the best J.J. can do is walk Laura through it and take some of the edge off her fear. Sinclair continues his psychic assault on Laura, who goes to Sinclair's inner sanctum, asks to join the cult.
