= Borealis Exploration =

Company in Canada

Borealis Exploration Ltd.
- Founded: 1968
- Key people: Rodney T. Cox – CEO and chairman Isaiah W. Cox – President, COO

Borealis Exploration Ltd. a research and development company first incorporated in Canada in 1968, with shares publicly traded on the Prague Stock Exchange under the symbol BOREY. with the most recent quarterly filings on December 31, 2014. The redomiciled Gibraltar-based corporate family now describes itself a virtual business.

Borealis previously had an Industry Classification 1382 – Oil and gas exploration services, and owns subsidiaries dealing with materials and power transfer.

Borealis Exploration has been under a cease trade order in Canada since September 13, 2001, for continuing failure to submit information required in an inquiry by the Ontario Securities Commission. The Alberta Securities Commission has been allowing variations on this cease trade order with exceptions being made for Canadian shareholders since the company's operations are located outside Canada, its head office is located in Gibraltar, and its securities are not listed on and do not trade on any exchange or market in Canada.

According to Businessweek several units filed their Annual on June 27, 2013, for the period ending March 31, 2013; with Moore Stephens auditing Faraway plc, Power Chips plc, Chorus Motors plc, Cool Chips plc, Wheeltug plc and Meyers Norris Penny LLP – MNP LLP auditing Roche Bay plc. In all of these reports both auditors reportedly "gave an unqualified opinion expressing doubt that the company can continue as a going concern". According to the Wall Street Journal Marketwatch company profile as of May 22, 2014, Borealis Exploration Ltd had a Price–earnings ratio of (negative) -7.43, and a liquidity ratio of 0.05, a return on assets of (negative) -64.31. By its company ordinances Borealis, which is located in Gibraltar, can not carry on business with persons resident in Gibraltar or own an interest in real property (with an exception) situated in Gibraltar.

Major Subsidiaries and operating units: (this citation no longer points to supporting information)

- Chorus Motors: Automotive
- WheelTug: Aircraft power
- Power Chips: Automotive power
- Cool Chips: Automotive power
- Avto Metals: Metallurgy
- Roche Bay: Mining Exploration
- Faraway – Canadian Mining Leases

Its Power Chips and Cool Chips subsidiaries publicised their exploring thermotunnelling technology in the early 2000s to increase the fuel-efficiency of automobiles. Powerchips is listed on the Pinksheets exchange but is flagged as high risk for not disclosing information and as of April 2011 the trading volume was zero for nearly six months.

Faraway PLC owns a 100% interest in 10,350 acres of Canadian long-term renewable leases on state land located near Freuchen Bay, Nunavut. The company was incorporated in 1996.

== Chorus Motors ==
Chorus Motors PLC. is research and development company that has invented and developed an improved AC induction motor/drive system. According to a Businessweek company overview as of June 27, 2013 "Chorus Motors PLC filed its Annual on Jun 27, 2013 for the period ending Mar 31, 2013. In this report its auditor, Moore Stephens, gave an unqualified opinion expressing doubt that the company can continue as a going concern."

=== Motor types ===
The Chorus Meshcon motor is a high-phase-order motor/drive system that claims to offer up to ten times the "burst", start-up, or acceleration torque of a conventional motor and drive of the same rated power and base speed.

Chorus motors claims the Meshcon Motor co-opts the harmonics that limit motor performance and that typically cause motor heating. According to these claims, a Chorus AC motor can generate far more torque than its conventional brethren. It is said to do this by changing both the layout of the magnetic coils and the power input waveforms of a standard AC induction motor. Another example, the Chorus Star motor, is claimed to achieve much higher torque densities than a traditional 3-phase motor, but allegedly with no cost penalty. The Chorus Star concept uses concentrated, high phase order windings..

The parent company Borealis Exploration Ltd. signed an agreement with Delta Air Lines making Delta the development partner and launch customer for the Boeing 737NG version of WheelTug to allow electric ground taxi. The company Wheeltug PLC has been spun off as a subsidiary of Chorus Motors PLC. and the expected delivery of the first units is scheduled for 2010..

WheelTug and Co-Operative Industries completed an Electrical Load Measurement (ELM) test on a B737NG in January 2010 at Hartsfield-Jackson International Airport in Atlanta, GA to confirm sufficient power.

Wheeltug's financial statements for the year ending March 31, 2013, include an audit by Moore Stephens accounting firm which raises doubt about the company's ability to continue as a going concern.

According to a company press release as of January 1, 2014, WheelTug's Order Book was 731 aircraft systems, across 13 airlines.
