= The Hand of Franklin =

2015 Canadian documentary film

The Hand of Franklin is a 2015 Canadian documentary film by Frank Wolf that follows a four-person team attempting to row the Northwest Passage in order to shed light on climate change in the Arctic. The film won the award for 'Best Documentary Feature' at the 2016 Ramunas Atelier International Film Awards, won for 'Best Canadian Film' at the 2015 Vancouver International Mountain Film Festival (VIMFF) and won the 'Adventure Award' at the 2016 San Francisco International Ocean Film Festival. It features music by Peirson Ross, The Cyrillic Typewriter, Sylvia Cloutier and Madeleine Allakariallak and airs in Canada on CBC's documentary channel.
