= Boreas Mountain (New York) =

Mountain in New York, United States

- Location within New York Adirondack Park Location within the United States

Highest point
- Elevation: 3,780 feet (1,150 m)
- Coordinates: 44°00′11″N 73°52′50″W

Geography
- Location: WNW of North Hudson, Essex County, New York, U.S.
- Topo map: USGS Mount Marcy

Boreas Mountain is a 3,780-foot-tall (1,150 m) mountain in the Adirondack Mountains region of New York. It is located west-northwest of North Hudson in Essex County. In 1919, the Conservation Commission built a 47-foot-tall (14 m) steel fire lookout tower on the mountain. Due to increased use of aerial detection, the tower became obsolete and was closed at the end of the 1971 fire lookout season and later removed.

== History ==
In May 1911, the Conservation Commission built a wood tower on the summit for fire lookout purposes. In 1919, the Conservation Commission replaced it with a 47-foot-tall (14 m) LS40 Aermotor steel tower. Due to increased use of aerial detection, the tower was closed at the end of the 1971 fire lookout season, and was later removed.
