= Chapeau! =

- Interactive map of Chapeau!

Restaurant information
- Established: 1993
- Owners: Ronald Voogel and Esther de Wit
- Head chef: Jan Sobecky
- Food type: French
- Rating: Michelin Guide
- Location: Hartenlustlaan 2, Bloemendaal, 2061 HB, Netherlands
- Coordinates: 52°24′21″N 4°37′24″E
- Seating capacity: 60
- Website: restaurantchapeau.nl

Chapeau! is a defunct restaurant located in Bloemendaal in the Netherlands. It was a fine dining restaurant that was awarded one Michelin star in the period 2003–2011. In 2012, the restaurant was rewarded two Michelin stars. The retained the two stars until its closure. GaultMillau awarded the restaurant 16.0 out of 20 points.

Last head chef was Jan Sobecky. Former head chefs that earned Michelin stars with Chapeau! were Roland Veldhuizen (2003–2005) and Jeroen Granemann (2005–2009). The restaurant closed down on 1 August 2016.

Chapeau! was a member of Alliance Gastronomique Néerlandaise.

== See also ==
- List of Michelin starred restaurants in the Netherlands
