= List of former U.S. county name etymologies =

This is a list of etymologies of former counties of the United States, including former names of current counties.

== List ==
County name (years established)	State	Name origin	Modern counties
Baine County (1866–1868)	Alabama	David W. Baine, Confederate General	Etowah County
Baker County (1868–1874)	Alabama	Alfred Baker, founder of Clanton, Alabama	Chilton County
Benton County (1832–1858)	Alabama	Thomas Hart Benton, U.S. Senator from Missouri	Calhoun County
Cahawba County (1818–1820)	Alabama	The Cahawba (Cahaba) River	Bibb County
Cotaco County (1818–1821)	Alabama	Cotaco Creek, possibly derived from the Cherokee "ikati" (swamp) and "kunahita" (long)	Morgan County
Decatur County (1821-1825)	Alabama	Stephen Decatur, Naval Commodore	Madison and Jackson counties
Hancock County (1850–1858)	Alabama	John Hancock, Founding Father and Governor of Massachusetts	Winston County
Jones County (1867)	Alabama	Elliot P. Jones, Alabama Legislature member	Lamar County
Jones County (1868)	Alabama	Josiah Jones, former legislator and local political leader	Covington County
Sanford County (1868–1877)	Alabama	Henry C. Sanford, Alabama Senate member	Lamar County
Chugiak–Eagle River Borough (1974–1975)	Alaska	Chugiak, Anchorage and Eagle River, Anchorage	Municipality of Anchorage
Greater Anchorage Area Borough (1964–1975)	Alaska	Anchorage	Municipality of Anchorage
Greater Juneau Area Borough (1963–1970)	Alaska	Juneau	City and Borough of Juneau
Greater Sitka Borough (1963–1971)	Alaska	Sitka	City and Borough of Sitka
Skagway-Hoonah-Angoon Census Area (1992–2007)	Alaska	Angoon, Hoonah, and Skagway	Municipality of Skagway and Hoonah–Angoon Census Area
Skagway-Yakutat-Angoon Census Area (1980–1992)	Alaska	Angoon, Skagway, and Yakutat	Municipality of Skagway, City and Borough of Yakutat and Hoonah–Angoon Census Area
Valdez–Cordova Census Area (1980–2019)	Alaska	Cordova and Valdez	Chugach Census Area and Copper River Census Area
Wade Hampton Census Area (1980–2015)	Alaska	Wade Hampton III, Confederate officer and South Carolina politician	Kusilvak Census Area
Pah-Ute County (1865–1871)	Arizona	Southern Paiute people, a Native American tribe which inhabited the area	Mohave County and Clark County, Nevada
Clayton County (1873–1875)	Arkansas	Either John M. Clayton, Arkansas Senate member, or Powell Clayton, U.S. Senator from Arkansas	Clay County
Dorsey County (1873–1885)	Arkansas	Stephen Wallace Dorsey, U.S. Senator from Arkansas	Cleveland County
Lovely County (1827–1828)	Arkansas	Major William Lewis Lovely, Indian agent to the Arkansas Cherokee, who managed the transaction of the county's land	Washington County and Oklahoma
Miller County (1820–1838)	Arkansas	James Miller, Governor of Arkansas Territory	Fannin County
Sarber County (1871–1875)	Arkansas	John Sarber, Arkansas Senate member	Logan County
Branciforte County (1850)	California	Branciforte, a Spanish colonial settlement, itself named for the 1st Marquess of Branciforte	Santa Cruz County
Klamath County (1851–1874)	California	A derivative of the Native "Athlameth" meaning people	Humboldt and Siskiyou Counties
Guadaloupe County (1861)	Colorado	Unknown, possibly Our Lady of Guadalupe	Conejos County
Greenwood County (1870–1874)	Colorado	Unknown	Elbert and Bent Counties
Carbonate County (1879)	Colorado	Unknown	Chaffee and Lake Counties
Uncompahgre County (1883)	Colorado	The Uncompahgre Ute band of Ute people	Ouray County
South Arapahoe County (1902–1903)	Colorado	Arapahoe County, from which it was created	Arapahoe County
Westmoreland County (1776–1786)	Connecticut	The town of Westmoreland in the Wyoming Valley	Luzerne County
Washington County (1791–1871)	District of Columbia	George Washington, U.S. President	Washington, D.C.
Benton County (1844–1850)	Florida	Thomas Hart Benton, U.S. Senator from Missouri	Hernando County
Fayette County (1832–1834)	Florida	Marquis de Lafayette, Revolutionary War general and French politician	Jackson, Calhoun, and Gulf Counties
Mosquito County (1824–1845)	Florida	Los Mosquitos, the Spanish name for Florida's east coast	Volusia, Brevard, Indian River, St. Lucie, Martin, Seminole, Osceola, Orange, Lake, Polk and Palm Beach Counties
New River County (1858–1861)	Florida	New River, a tributary of the Santa Fe River	Bradford County
Bourbon County (1785–1788)	Georgia	House of Bourbon, the European dynasty	
Campbell County (1828–1931)	Georgia	Duncan G. Campbell, legislator and U.S. commissioner	Douglas, Milton and Fulton Counties
Cass County (1832–1861)	Georgia	Lewis Cass, Secretary of War	Bartow County
Kinchafoonee County (1853–1856)	Georgia	Kinchafoonee Creek, Creek for "mortar nutshells", a type of nutcracker	Webster County
Milton County (1857–1931)	Georgia	John Milton, Continental Army lieutenant and Georgia Secretary of State	Fulton County
Walton County (1803–1818)	Georgia	George Walton, U.S. Senator from Georgia	Buncombe County
Alturas County (1864–1895)	Idaho	Spanish for "mountainous heights"	Blaine and Lincoln Counties
Lah-Toh County (1864–1867)	Idaho	Latah Creek, Nez Perce for "the place of pine trees and pestle"	Kootenai, Latah and Nez Perce Counties
Logan County (1889–1895)	Idaho	Unknown	Lincoln County
Richardville County (1844)	Indiana	Jean Baptiste Richardville, civil chief of the Miami people	Howard County
Slaughter County (1838–1839)	Iowa	William B. Slaughter, secretary of Wisconsin Territory	Washington County
Bancroft County (1851–1857)	Iowa	George Bancroft, Secretary of the Navy	Kossuth County
Crocker County (1871–1872)	Iowa	Marcellus M. Crocker, Union Army Brigadier general	Kossuth County
Wahkaw County (1851–1853)	Iowa	Sioux for "big medicine"	Woodbury County
Billings County (1873–1874)	Kansas	Either as a joke or for N. H. Billings, county attorney	Norton County
Breckinridge County (1873–1881)	Kansas	John C. Breckinridge, Kentucky politician and U.S. Vice President	Lyon County
Buffalo County (1873–1881)	Kansas	American bison, which were common in the area	Gray and Finney Counties
Davis County (1855–1889)	Kansas	Jefferson Davis, then-Secretary of War	Geary County
Foote County (1873–1881)	Kansas	Most likely Andrew Hull Foote, Union Naval officer	Gray County
Garfield County (1887–1893)	Kansas	James A. Garfield, U.S. President	Finney County
Godfrey County (1855–1861)	Kansas	Either Bill Godfrey, trader among the Osage Nation, or Gabriel Godfrey, subagent to the Potawatomi	Chautauqua and Elk Counties
Howard County (1867–1875)	Kansas	Oliver Otis Howard, Union Army general	Chautauqua and Elk Counties
Hunter County (1855–1864)	Kansas	Most likely Robert M. T. Hunter, Virginia politician	Butler, Cowley, Sedgwick, Sumner, Elk, Chautauqua, and Greenwood Counties
Irving County (1860–1864)	Kansas	Washington Irving, author	Butler County
Kansas County (1873–1883)	Kansas	The Kaw (Kansas) tribe	Seward County
Madison County (1855–1861)	Kansas	Most likely James Madison, U.S. President	Lyon and Greenwood Counties
Otoe County (1860–1864)	Kansas	Otoe, a Native American people	Butler County
Peketon County (1859–1861)	Kansas	Unknown, possibly a Sauk word for "flat land"	Most of south west Kansas
Sequoyah County (1873–1883)	Kansas	Sequoyah, creator of the Cherokee syllabary	Finney County
Seward County (1861–1867)	Kansas	Most likely William H. Seward, U.S. Secretary of State	Chautauqua, Elk, and Greenwood Counties
Shirley County (1860–1867)	Kansas	Either William Shirley, colonial governor of Massachusetts, or Jane Shirley, a "lady of questionable character"	Cloud County
Washington County (1855–1857)	Kansas	George Washington, U.S. President	Most of south west Kansas
Beckham County (1904)	Kentucky	J. C. W. Beckham, Governor of Kentucky	Carter County
Biloxi Parish (1811-1812)	Louisiana	Unknown	Coastal Mississippi
Carroll Parish (1838–1877)	Louisiana	Charles Carroll of Carrollton, U.S. Senator from Maryland	East Carroll and West Carroll Parishes
Feliciana Parish (1810–1824)	Louisiana	Marie Felicité, wife of Viceroy of New Spain Bernardo de Gálvez	East Feliciana and West Feliciana Parishes
Pascagoula Parish (1811–1812)	Louisiana	Unknown	Coastal Mississippi
Warren Parish (1811–1814)	Louisiana	Unknown	Ouachita and Concordia Parishes
Isle Royale County (1875–1897)	Michigan	Isle Royale, an island in Lake Superior	Keweenaw County
Manitou County (1855–1895)	Michigan	North and South Manitou Islands, in Lake Michigan	Leelanau County
Michilimackinac County (1818–1849)	Michigan	Mi-shi-ne-macki-nong, the Ojibwe name for Mackinac Island, derived from the Mi-shi-ne-macki naw-go tribe	Mackinac County
Tonedagana County (1840-1843)	Michigan	Derived from a Odawa war chief from the Cross Village area	Emmet County
Manomin County (1857–1858)	Minnesota	A variant spelling of "manoomin", the Ojibwe term for wild rice	Anoka County
Monongalia County (1861-1870)	Minnesota	Unknown	Kandiyohi County
Pearl County (1872–1878)	Mississippi	Pearl River, a river in the area	Pearl River County
Allen County (1843–1845)	Missouri	Unknown	Atchison County
Ashley County (1843–1845)	Missouri	William Henry Ashley, Lieutenant Governor of Missouri	Texas County
Decatur County (1843–1845)	Missouri	Stephen Decatur, Naval Commodore	Ozark County
Dodge County (1849–1853)	Missouri	Unknown	Putnam County
Kinderhook County (1841–1843)	Missouri	Kinderhook, New York, birthplace of Martin Van Buren	Camden County
Lillard County (1821–1825)	Missouri	James Lillard, constitutional convention and Missouri General Assembly member	Camden County
Niangua County (1842–1844)	Missouri	Niangua River, from the Native American "nehemgar", meaning "a river of numerous springs or sources"	Dallas County
Rives County (1834–1841)	Missouri	William Cabell Rives, Senator from Virginia	Henry County
Edgerton County (1865–1867)	Montana	Sidney Edgerton, Governor of Montana Territory	Lewis and Clark County
Bullfrog County (1987–1989)	Nevada	Bullfrog Mining District, itself named for the gold ore there being colored like a bullfrog	Nye County
Lake County (1861–1862)	Nevada	A number of lakes in the area, such as Honey Lake, Pyramid Lake, and Winnemucca Lake	Lassen County and Washoe County
Ormsby County (1861–1969)	Nevada	Major William Ormsby, early settler of Carson City and militia leader during the Pyramid Lake War	Consolidated Municipality of Carson City
Roop County (1862–1864)	Nevada	Isaac Roop, governor of Nevada Territory	Lassen County and Washoe County
Santa Ana County (1852–1876)	New Mexico	Unknown	Bernalillo and McKinley Counties
Charlotte County (1772–1784)	New York	Charlotte of Mecklenburg-Strelitz, wife of George III of the United Kingdom	Washington County
Tryon County (1772–1784)	New York	William Tryon, colonial governor of New York	Montgomery County
Glasgow County (1791–1799)	North Carolina	James Glasgow, North Carolina Secretary of State	Greene County
Wallace County (1883–1896)	North Dakota	Unknown	McKenzie County
County E (1891–1892)	Oklahoma	Temporary name given by an Act of Congress	Ellis, Roger Mills and Woodward Counties
Day County (1892–1907)	Oklahoma	Charles Day, a contractor who built the courthouse at Ioland	Ellis, Roger Mills and Woodward Counties
Swanson County (1910–1911)	Oklahoma	Claude A. Swanson, Governor of Virginia	Comanche County
Umpqua County (1851–1862)	Oregon	The Umpqua River, a river in the area	Douglas and Coos Counties
Ontario County (1810–1812)	Pennsylvania	Unknown	Bradford County
Claremont County (1785–1800)	South Carolina	Unknown	Sumter County
Granville County (1785–1798)	South Carolina	John Granville, Earl of Bath, British landowner	Beaufort and Colleton Counties
Lewisburg County (1785–1791)	South Carolina	Unknown	Orangeburg County
Liberty County (1785–1798)	South Carolina	The freedom gained due to the American Revolution	Marion County
Orange County (1785–1791)	South Carolina	William of Orange, King of England	Orangeburg County
Salem County (1791–1800)	South Carolina	Unknown, probably after Salem Black River Presbyterian Church	Sumter County
Winton County (1785–1800)	South Carolina	Unknown	Barnwell County
Winyah County (1785–1800)	South Carolina	Winyah Bay, an estuary in the area	Georgetown County
Armstrong County (1895–1953)	South Dakota	Moses K. Armstrong, delegate to the House of Representatives for Dakota at-large	Dewey, Stanley, and Ziebach Counties
Lugenbeel County (1889–1909)	South Dakota	Pinkney Lugenbeel, United States Army officer	Bennett and Todd Counties
Pyatt County (1883–1895)	South Dakota	Unknown	Dewey, Stanley, and Ziebach Counties
Shannon County (1875–2015)	South Dakota	Peter C. Shannon, Chief Justice of the Supreme Court of the Dakota Territory	Oglala Lakota County
Washabaugh County (1883–1983)	South Dakota	Frank J. Washabaugh, member of the Dakota Territorial Council	Jackson County
Washington County (1883–1943)	South Dakota	George Washington, U.S. President	Jackson, Pennington and Shannon Counties
James County (1871–1919)	Tennessee	Rev. Jesse J. James, father of Elbert Abdiel James, who introduced legislation to form the county	Hamilton County
Buchanan County (1858–1861)	Texas	James Buchanan, U.S. President	Stephens County
Buchel County (1887–1897)	Texas	Augustus Buchel, Confederate colonel	Brewster County
Dawson County (1858–1866)	Texas	Nicholas Mosby Dawson, Republic of Texas military leader and commander in the Dawson massacre	Uvalde and Kinney Counties
Davis County (1861–1871)	Texas	Jefferson Davis, President of the Confederate States of America	Cass County
Encinal County (1856–1899)	Texas	Unknown	Webb County
Foley County (1887–1897)	Texas	Unknown	Brewster County
Harrisburg County (1836–1839)	Texas	Harrisburg, Houston, itself named after Harrisburg, Pennsylvania and its founder, John Richardson Harris	Harris County
Navasota County (1841–1842)	Texas	Unknown	Brazos County
Wegefarth County (1873–1876)	Texas	Conrad Wegefarth, president of the Texas Immigrant Aid and Supply Company	Collingsworth, Donley, Briscoe, Childress, Gray, Hall, and Wheeler Counties
Cedar County (1856–1862)	Utah	Cedar trees growing in the area (which are actually juniper trees)	Utah County
Desert County (1852–1862)	Utah	The surrounding desert	Box Elder and Tooele Counties
Greasewood County (1856–1862)	Utah	Sarcobatus (greasewood) plant, which grew in the area	Box Elder County
Green River County (1852–1872)	Utah	The Green River, a Colorado River tributary	Cache, Weber, Morgan, Davis, Wasatch, Summit, Duchesne, Carbon, and Utah Counties
Malad County (1856–1862)	Utah	The Malad River, from the French "malade" meaning sick	Box Elder County
Rio Virgen County (1869–1872)	Utah	The Virgin River, a Colorado River tributary	Washington County
Shambip County (1856–1862)	Utah	Unknown, possibly the Goshute word for the bulrush plant	Tooele County
Elizabeth City County (1634–1952)	Virginia	Elizabeth Stuart, Queen consort of Bohemia	City of Hampton
Fincastle County (1772–1776)	Virginia	Either Viscount of Fincastle, Scottish Peer, Earl of Dunmore, governor of Virginia, or Fincastle, Virginia	Montgomery and Washington Counties
Illinois County (1778–1784)	Virginia	The Algonquian word "ilinouek", meaning "ordinary speaker"	Ohio and Illinois
Kentucky County (1778–1784)	Virginia	The Iroquois word "ken-tah-ten", meaning either "land of tomorrow", "meadow", "prairie", or "the river of blood"	Kentucky
Nansemond County (1646–1972)	Virginia	The Nansemond indigenous people	City of Suffolk
City of Nansemond (1972–1974)	Virginia	The Nansemond indigenous people	City of Suffolk
Norfolk County (1691–1963)	Virginia	Most likely Norfolk, home county of Captain Adam Thoroughgood	City of Chesapeake
Princess Anne County (1691–1963)	Virginia	Queen Anne, Queen of Great Britain and Ireland	City of Virginia Beach
Warwick County (1634–1952)	Virginia	Either Robert Rich, Earl of Warwick, or Warwick, a town in the UK	City of Newport News
City of Warwick (1952–1958)	Virginia	Either Robert Rich, Earl of Warwick, or Warwick, a town in the UK	City of Newport News
Yohogania County (1776–1779)	Virginia	The Youghiogheny River, a tributary of the Monongahela River	Westmoreland County
Chehalis County (1854–1915)	Washington	The Chehalis people, meaning "sand" or "inlanders"	Grays Harbor County
Quillehuyte County (1868–1869)	Washington	Most likely the Quileute natives	Clallam and Jefferson Counties
Sawamish County (1868–1869)	Washington	The Sahewamish natives	Mason County
Slaughter County (1857)	Washington	Lieutenant William A. Slaughter, who had been killed at White River a year prior	Kitsap County
La Pointe County (1845–1866)	Wisconsin	La Pointe, Wisconsin	Itasca, Washington, Ramsey, Benton, Douglas, Ashland, and Bayfield Counties
Carter County (1867–1869)	Wyoming	William Alexander Carter, a sutler from Fort Bridger, Wyoming	Sweetwater County
Pease County (1875–1879)	Wyoming	E. L. Pease, President of the Territorial Legislative Council	Johnson County

== Bibliography ==
- Krakow, Kenneth K. (1975). Georgia Place-Names: Their History and Origins. Macon, Georgia: Winship Press. ISBN 0-915430-00-2.
- Stevens, Walter Barlow (1921). Centennial History of Missouri (The Center State): One Hundred Years in the Union, 1820-1921. American guide series. Chicago, Illinois: The S. J. Clarke Publishing Company.
- Federal Writers' Project (1940). South Dakota Place-Names. American guide series. Vermillion, South Dakota: University of South Dakota. OCLC 34885177.
- Van Cott, John W. (1990). Utah Place Names. Salt Lake City: University of Utah Press. ISBN 978-0-87480-345-7.
