= List of former United States counties =

This is a list of former United States counties, a list of United States counties (administrative subunits of a U.S. state) that no longer exist.

They were established by a state, provincial, colonial, or territorial government. Most of these counties were created and disbanded in the 19th century; county boundaries have changed little since 1900 in the vast majority of states. A county is repeated on the list if its jurisdiction changed from one state, colony, or territory to another.

This list includes (but is not limited to) counties that were renamed but retained their territorial integrity, or counties that were transferred wholesale to another state when it was separated from another state (Massachusetts counties transferred to Maine; Virginia counties transferred to Kentucky and West Virginia; and North Carolina counties transferred to Tennessee).

== Alabama ==
- Baine County, Alabama (1866–1867, reestablished as Etowah County a year later)
- Baker County, Alabama (1868–1874, renamed Chilton County)
- Benton County, Alabama (1832–1858, named for Thomas Hart Benton, Creek War officer and U.S. Senator, renamed Calhoun County in 1858 for John C. Calhoun)
- Cahawba County, Alabama (1818–1820, renamed Bibb County)
- Cotaco County, Alabama (1818–1821, renamed Morgan County)
- Decatur County, Alabama (1821–1825, land redistributed between Madison and Jackson counties)
- Elk County, Alabama (1817-1818), Land split into Lauderdale and Limestone Counties and redistributed to Madison County. The Eastern boundary of Elk County followed what is now the present day Ardmore Highway.
- Hancock County, Alabama (1850–1858, renamed Winston County)
- Jones County, Alabama (Feb–Nov 1867, area was reestablished in Oct 1868 as Sanford County and then renamed Lamar County in 1877)
- Jones County, Alabama (Aug–Oct 1868, Covington County was briefly renamed Jones County then changed back)
- Sanford County, Alabama (1868–1877, renamed Lamar County)

== Alaska ==
Alaska has never created counties. Under Section 9 of the 1912 organic act creating the Territory of Alaska, Alaska was prohibited from establishing counties without explicit approval from the U.S. Congress. The framers of the Constitution of Alaska chose to forgo consideration of a county system in favor of a system of boroughs, both organized and unorganized. In 1961, the Alaska Legislature formalized the borough structure to encompass multiple, separate organized boroughs and a single unorganized borough. Alaska currently has 18 organized boroughs. The United States Census Bureau, beginning with the 1970 United States census, divided the Unorganized Borough into census areas. The boundaries of these census areas were largely based upon the early election districts of the state, which in turn were largely based upon the recording districts of the territory. The following is a list of former boroughs and census areas in Alaska:

- Chugiak–Eagle River Borough (1974–1975, incorporation invalidated by the Alaska Supreme Court)
- Greater Anchorage Area Borough (1964–1975, succeeded by Municipality of Anchorage)
- Greater Juneau Borough (1963–1970, succeeded by City and Borough of Juneau)
- Greater Sitka Borough (1963–1971, succeeded by City and Borough of Sitka)
- The Haines Borough was incorporated in 1968 as a third-class borough. Through consolidation, this municipality was dissolved, along with the City of Haines, in 2002. A home rule borough, also called the Haines Borough, was incorporated in the place of these two municipalities.
- Skagway-Hoonah-Angoon Census Area (1992–2007), renamed Hoonah-Angoon Census Area after Skagway incorporated as a city-borough.
- Skagway-Yakutat-Angoon Census Area (1980–1992), renamed Skagway-Hoonah-Angoon Census Area after Yakutat incorporated as a city-borough.
- Valdez-Cordova Census Area (1980–2019), split in 2019 into Chugach Census Area and Copper River Census Area.
- Wade Hampton Census Area (1980–2015), renamed to Kusilvak Census Area.

== Arizona ==
- Pah-Ute County, Arizona Territory (1865–1871) majority of the county transferred to Nevada in 1866, the remainder transferred to Mohave County

== Arkansas ==
- Clayton County, Arkansas (1873–1875, renamed Clay County)
- Dorsey County, Arkansas (1873–1885, renamed Cleveland County)
- Lovely County, Arkansas Territory (1827–1828) most of the county was lost to Oklahoma due to the Cherokee Treaty of 1828, the remainder became Washington County
- Miller County, Arkansas Territory (1820–1838, became part of Indian Territory and present-day Texas)
- Sarber County, Arkansas (1871–1875, renamed Logan County)

== California ==
- Branciforte County - renamed to Santa Cruz County in 1850 after less than a year of existence.
- Buena Vista County – created in 1855 by the California legislature out of the southeastern territory of Tulare County on the west of the Sierra Nevada but was never officially organized. Some of that region was later organized as Kern County in 1866, with additions from Los Angeles and San Bernardino counties.
- Coso County – created in 1864 by the California legislature out of territory of Tulare County on the east slope of the Sierra Nevada but was never officially organized. The region was later organized in 1866 as Inyo County with additions from Los Angeles and San Bernardino counties.
- Klamath County – created in 1851 from the northern half of Trinity County. In 1874 it was divided between Humboldt and Siskiyou counties.
- Pautah County – created by the California legislature in 1852 out of territory the state believed would be ceded to it east of Lake Tahoe, but which was given to Nevada. The county was never officially organized.

== Colorado ==
Colorado Territory was formed from the lands of four organized territories: Kansas to the southeast, New Mexico to the south, Utah to the west, and Nebraska to the northeast. Before Colorado Territory was organized, all of these except Nebraska had declared county boundaries that included part of modern-day Colorado.

=== Counties formed by New Mexico Territory ===
- Taos County, New Mexico Territory was originally one of the seven partidos of the Spanish, and later Mexican, province of Nuevo México. One of the nine original counties created by the U.S. Territory of New Mexico on January 29, 1852; ceased to have jurisdiction over Colorado in 1861.
- Mora County, New Mexico Territory was split from Taos County and San Miguel County on February 1, 1860, and ceased to have jurisdiction over Colorado in 1861.

=== Counties formed by Utah Territory ===
On March 3, 1852, the following counties were organized by Utah Territory, with boundaries reaching into what is now western Colorado:

- Great Salt Lake County
- Iron County
- Sanpete County
- Utah County
- Washington County

Upon the organization of Colorado Territory in 1861, which became law on February 28, these counties ceased to have jurisdiction in Colorado.

Green River County was also created on March 3, 1852, but never organized; it was dissolved in 1857 and recreated in 1859. After losing land to Colorado Territory in 1861 and Wyoming Territory in 1868, Green River County was finally dissolved in 1872.

Beaver County was formed on January 5, 1856 from parts of Iron and Millard counties, and like other Utah counties, ceased to have jurisdiction in Colorado.

=== Counties created by Kansas Territory ===
Kansas Territory's western reaches encompassed the mining centers of Aurora and Pike's Peak. Beginning with the massive Arapahoe County, Kansas Territory provided for a number of counties in what would become Colorado, but organized none of them before achieving statehood in 1861.

Arapahoe County was proclaimed August 25, 1855 but never organized; it reverted to unorganized territory when Kansas joined the Union on January 29, 1861. On February 7, 1859, several counties were split from Arapahoe County; none of them were organized, and also reverted to unorganized territory when Kansas became a state. They were:

- Broderick County
- El Paso County
- Fremont County
- Montana County
- Oro County

Peketon County was created on the same day in 1859, but never organized. Like Arapahoe and its daughter counties, it reverted to unorganized territory upon Kansas achieving statehood.

=== Note on Nebraska Territory ===
No counties were organized in Nebraska Territory's portion of the future Colorado Territory.

=== Counties created by the Provisional Territory of Jefferson ===
On November 28, 1859, the Provisional General Assembly of the extralegal Territory of Jefferson established 12 counties:

- Arrappahoe County
- Cheyenne County
- El Paso County
- Fountain County
- Heele County
- Jackson County
- Jefferson County
- Montana County
- North County
- Park County
- Saratoga County
- St. Vrains County

Although it was never officially recognized by the federal government embroiled in the debate over slavery, the provisional government of the Territory of Jefferson held effective control of what became Colorado for a year and a half. Although the act establishing the Colorado Territory became law on February 28, 1861, the first Federal governor, William Gilpin, did not arrive in Denver until late May, and the Jefferson government disbanded itself on June 6, 1861. In November 1861, Colorado's territorial legislature would establish counties of its own, with many boundaries following those of the Jefferson counties.

=== Counties created by the Territory of Colorado ===
- Guadalupe County, Colorado Territory (November 1–7, 1861), was one of the 17 original counties created by the Territory of Colorado. The county was renamed Conejos County after only six days.
- Greenwood County, Colorado Territory (February 11, 1870 to February 6, 1874), was created from former Cheyenne and Arapaho tribal land and the eastern portion of Huerfano County. The county was abolished four years later, and its territory split between Elbert County and Bent County.
- Platte County, Colorado Territory (February 9, 1872 to February 9, 1874), was created from the eastern portion of Weld County. The county was abolished two years later after organizers failed to secure voter approval, and the territory of the county was returned to Weld County.

=== Counties created by the State of Colorado ===
- Carbonate County, Colorado (February 8–10, 1879). Lake County was renamed Carbonate County in 1879. Only two days later, Carbonate County was split into the new Chaffee County and a reestablished Lake County.
- Uncompaghre County, Colorado (February 27 to March 2, 1883). Ouray County was renamed Uncompaghre County for only four days in 1883.
- South Arapahoe County, Colorado (November 15, 1902, to April 11, 1903), was one of three counties created from Arapahoe County in 1902. The name was changed back to Arapahoe County after five months.

== Connecticut ==
- Westmoreland County, Connecticut (see Pennamite–Yankee War and State of Westmoreland)

== Delaware ==
- Kent County, Delaware was formerly known as St. Jones County.
- Sussex County, Delaware was formerly known as Deale County.

== District of Columbia ==
The United States Census Bureau and the Office of Management and Budget currently consider the District of Columbia to consist of a single county equivalent. Otherwise the District of Columbia currently has no counties or county equivalents. The former counties of the District of Columbia are:

- Alexandria County, D.C. (1791–1846) retroceded to Virginia becoming Alexandria County, Virginia.
- Washington County, D.C. Abolished in 1871 and consolidated with the District of Columbia. Under the current (2001, revised through 2005) District of Columbia Code, the entire District of Columbia is a single body corporate for district purposes; the code does not mention Washington County except to make the District of Columbia the successor in title to its property.

Georgetown City and Washington City are former county equivalents. The District of Columbia comprised three county equivalents when it was consolidated in 1871: Georgetown City, Washington City, and the Remainder of the District—as they are termed in the Ninth Census of the United States (1870). There had been four county equivalents in the District prior to the retrocession of Alexandria to Virginia in 1846. In its retrospective decennial population counts the Ninth Census lists four for 1840 back to 1810, Alexandria and Washington counties alone for 1800, and none for 1790 prior to the creation of the district.

== Florida ==
- Benton County, Florida, named for Missouri Senator Thomas Hart Benton in 1844, renamed Hernando County in 1850
- Fayette County, Florida became parts of Jackson, Calhoun and Gulf counties in 1833
- Mosquito County, Florida renamed Orange County, Florida in 1845.
- New River County, Florida renamed Bradford County, Florida in 1861.

== Georgia ==
- Bourbon County, Georgia (organized by Georgia in 1785 out of disputed Yazoo lands in present-day Mississippi; dissolved in 1788)
- Campbell County, Georgia (1828–1931); merged with Fulton County
- Cass County, Georgia (1832–1861); renamed Bartow County
- Kinchafoonee County, Georgia (1853–1856); renamed Webster County
- Milton County, Georgia (1857–1931); merged with Fulton County
- Walton County (1803–1818); merged with Buncombe County, North Carolina

== Idaho ==
- Alturas County, Idaho (1864–1895) reduced greatly in size at creation of Elmore County and Logan County in 1889. In 1891, an attempt was made to transfer to Alta County, declared unconstitutional. Transferred to Blaine County in 1895
- Lah-Toh County, Idaho Territory (1864–1867) absorbed by Nez Perce and Kootenai County.
- Logan County, Idaho (1889–1895) In 1891, an attempt was made to transfer territory to Lincoln County and Alta County. Act declared unconstitutional. In 1895, the Idaho Legislature combined Logan and Alturas Counties into a new county called Blaine
- Alta County created from Alturas in 1891, Act declared unconstitutional in May, 1891.

== Illinois ==
=== Revolutionary era ===
- Illinois County, Virginia, formed in 1778 to govern Virginia's claims to present-day Illinois, Indiana, Michigan, Ohio, Wisconsin and eastern Minnesota; county abolished 5 January 1782; territory ceded by Virginia to Congress in March 1784. Its effective reach was limited to the French settlements at Cahokia, Kaskaskia, and Vincennes.

=== Former counties of the Northwest and Indiana territories ===
Before Illinois Territory was created in 1809, it was part of the Northwest Territory from 1788 to 1800, and Indiana Territory from 1800 to 1809. At first, two counties of the Northwest Territory were created to govern what became the modern state of Illinois, followed by two others:

- St. Clair County, Northwest Territory established April 27, 1790, later St. Clair County, Indiana Territory; upon the organization of Indiana Territory in 1800, St. Clair County was enlarged to take in present-day Wisconsin, eastern Minnesota, and the western portion of Michigan's Upper Peninsula. When Illinois Territory was set off from the Indiana Territory in 1809, St. Clair County was included in the new government.
- Knox County, Northwest Territory, established June 20, 1790, later Knox County, Indiana Territory, 1800; its boundaries in 1795 included the eastern half of the future state of Illinois. Portions of Knox County would be transferred to Michigan Territory upon its organization in 1805 and to Illinois Territory upon its organization in 1809; the remainder was included in the state of Indiana upon its achieving statehood in 1816.
- Randolph County, Northwest Territory, proclaimed 1795, from part of St. Clair County; transferred to Indiana Territory in 1800 and Illinois Territory in 1809, now Randolph County, Illinois.
- Wayne County, Northwest Territory, proclaimed on August 15, 1796 following the British evacuation of Detroit; out of portions of Hamilton County, Northwest Territory and unorganized land, mostly in the present-day Lower Peninsula of Michigan. This first Wayne County originally included a slice of the present Lake Michigan shoreline of Illinois, the site of present-day Chicago; its lands would be transferred to Knox County, Indiana Territory and later, the Illinois Territory. Transferred to Indiana Territory in 1803 and to Michigan Territory in 1805.

=== Counties organized by Illinois Territory ===
Other counties were organized by the Illinois Territory from the lands of St. Clair County between 1812 and 1819 and notionally included parts of the future Michigan, Minnesota, and Wisconsin territories in their boundaries:

- Madison County, Illinois Territory, 1813, from St. Clair
- Edwards County, Illinois Territory, 1815, from Madison
- Crawford County, Illinois Territory, 1816, from Edwards
- Bond County, Illinois Territory, 1817, from Madison

Before Illinois achieved statehood in 1818, the part of Illinois Territory excluded from the new state (Wisconsin, eastern Minnesota, and the western Upper Peninsula of Michigan) was transferred to Michigan Territory. No county governments were included in this transfer.

== Indiana ==
=== Revolutionary era ===
- Illinois County, Virginia, formed in 1778 to govern Virginia's claims to present-day Illinois, Indiana, Michigan, Ohio, Wisconsin and eastern Minnesota; county abolished 5 January 1782; territory ceded by Virginia to Congress in March 1784. Its effective reach was limited to the French settlements at Cahokia, Kaskaskia, and Vincennes.

=== Former counties of the Northwest and Indiana territories ===
Indiana Territory was created in 1800, and had since 1788 been part of the Northwest Territory; the new territory included modern-day Illinois, Indiana, Wisconsin and eastern Minnesota, as well at the western Upper Peninsula of Michigan. At first, one county of the Northwest Territory had been created to govern what became the modern state of Indiana, and three others would be included in the Indiana Territory:

- Knox County, Northwest Territory, established June 20, 1790, later Knox County, Indiana Territory, 1800; its boundaries in 1795 included the eastern half of the future state of Illinois, and its 1800 boundaries included the western half of Michigan's Lower Peninsula. The northern portions of Knox County would be transferred to Michigan Territory upon its organization in 1805, and the westernmost to Illinois Territory upon its organization in 1809; the remainder was included in the state of Indiana upon its achieving statehood in 1816. The county's current form is that of Knox County, Indiana.
- St. Clair County, Northwest Territory established April 27, 1790, later St. Clair County, Indiana Territory; upon the organization of Indiana Territory in 1800, St. Clair County was included in the new territory and enlarged to take in present-day Wisconsin, eastern Minnesota, and the western portion of Michigan's Upper Peninsula. When Illinois Territory was set off from the Indiana Territory in 1809, St. Clair County was included in the new government.
- Randolph County, Northwest Territory, proclaimed 1795, from part of St. Clair County; transferred to Indiana Territory in 1800 and Illinois Territory in 1809, now Randolph County, Illinois.
- Wayne County, Northwest Territory, proclaimed on August 15, 1796 following the British evacuation of Detroit; out of portions of Hamilton County, Northwest Territory and unorganized land, mostly in the present-day Lower Peninsula of Michigan. This first Wayne County originally included a slice of northern Indiana; all of Wayne County west of the present Indiana–Ohio line was transferred to Knox County, Indiana Territory in 1800. After losing other lands to the new state of Ohio, the remaining portion of Wayne County was transferred to Indiana Territory in 1803 and to Michigan Territory in 1805. The current Wayne County, Michigan is considered a successor of the 1796 establishment.

=== Former districts of the Louisiana Territory ===
- District of Louisiana, attached to Indiana Territory October 1, 1804, pending the organization of Louisiana Territory, which took place July 4, 1805.

=== Former counties of the State of Indiana ===
- Richardville County, name changed to Howard County in 1859.
- Newton County, Indiana, Original Newton County abolished in 1839. Current County recreated in 1859 as the last county in Indiana.

== Iowa ==
=== Counties of Iowa created by Michigan Territory ===
- Des Moines County, Michigan Territory was organized in 1834, became part of Wisconsin Territory in 1836, and is now Des Moines County, Iowa
- Dubuque County, Michigan Territory was organized in 1834, became part of Wisconsin Territory in 1836, and is now Dubuque County, Iowa

=== Counties of Iowa created by Wisconsin Territory ===
- Henry County, Wisconsin Territory, 1836; see Henry County, Iowa
- Lee County, Wisconsin Territory, 1836; see Lee County, Iowa
- Louisa County, Wisconsin Territory, 1836; see Louisa County, Iowa
- Muscatine County, Wisconsin Territory, 1836; see Muscatine County, Iowa
- Van Buren County, Wisconsin Territory, 1836; see Van Buren County, Iowa
- Henry County, Wisconsin Territory, 1836; see Henry County, Iowa
- Benton County, Wisconsin Territory, 1837; see Benton County, Iowa
- Buchanan County, Wisconsin Territory, 1837; see Buchanan County, Iowa
- Cedar County, Wisconsin Territory, 1837; see Cedar County, Iowa
- Clayton County, Wisconsin Territory, 1837; see Clayton County, Iowa
- Clinton County, Wisconsin Territory, 1837; see Clinton County, Iowa
- Delaware County, Wisconsin Territory, 1837; see Delaware County, Iowa
- Fayette County, Wisconsin Territory, 1837; see Fayette County, Iowa
- Jackson County, Wisconsin Territory, 1837; see Jackson County, Iowa
- Johnson County, Wisconsin Territory, 1837; see Johnson County, Iowa
- Jones County, Wisconsin Territory, 1837; see Jones County, Iowa
- Keokuk County, Wisconsin Territory, 1837; see Keokuk County, Iowa
- Linn County, Wisconsin Territory, 1836; see Linn County, Iowa
- Scott County, Wisconsin Territory, 1837; see Scott County, Iowa
- Slaughter County, Wisconsin Territory, 1838; see Washington County, Iowa

=== Former counties of the State of Iowa ===
- Bancroft County, Iowa was established in 1851. It was abolished in 1857 and the area was joined to Kossuth County.
- Crocker County, Iowa was created in 1870 out of Kossuth County from portions of what had been Bancroft County. It was merged back into Kossuth County in 1871.
- Wahkaw County, Iowa was established on January 15, 1851; on January 12, 1853, its name was changed to Woodbury County.

== Kansas ==
=== Counties created by Kansas Territory ===
Several counties were created by the government of Kansas Territory in its western reaches, which included the mining districts of Auraria and Pike's Peak. None were ever organized, and all reverted to unorganized territory when Kansas achieved statehood in 1861. See also the Colorado section, above.

- Arapahoe County, Kansas Territory, covered all of western Kansas Territory when it was proclaimed on August 25, 1855. On February 7, 1859, the following counties were created from parts of Arapahoe County:
  - Broderick County, Kansas Territory
  - El Paso County, Kansas Territory
  - Fremont County, Kansas Territory
  - Montana County, Kansas Territory
  - Oro County, Kansas Territory
- Peketon County, Kansas Territory was created on the same day that these counties were split off from Arapaho; like them, it was never organized and reverted to unorganized territory in 1861.
- Seward County, Kansas Territory; named Godfrey until 1861. Dissolved in 1867.
- Hunter County, Kansas Territory

=== Counties created by the State of Kansas ===
- Garfield County, Kansas, now a part of Finney County
- Howard County, Kansas (1875)
- Otoe County, Kansas
- Sequoyah County, Kansas, now part of Finney County
- Kansas County, Kansas, now part of Seward County
- Buffalo County, Kansas
- Madison County, Kansas, now part of Lyon and Greenwood Counties
- Irving County, Kansas

== Kentucky ==
Because Kentucky began as a political dependency of Virginia, its earliest counties were organized by that government. See also Virginia & Virginia Colony, below

=== Historic counties created by Virginia ===
- Fincastle County, Virginia, proclaimed 1772, divided in 1776 into Montgomery, Washington, and Kentucky counties.
- Kentucky County, Virginia had boundaries much the same as today's Commonwealth of Kentucky.

=== Modern counties created by Virginia ===
In 1780, Kentucky County was divided by the Virginia government into three counties:

- Fayette County, Kentucky
- Jefferson County, Kentucky
- Lincoln County, Kentucky

Between 1784 and 1788, six more counties would be created in Kentucky by the Virginia authorities:

- Nelson County, Kentucky in 1784, from part of Jefferson County
- Bourbon County, Kentucky in 1785, from part of Fayette County
- Madison County, Kentucky in 1785, from part of Lincoln County
- Mercer County, Kentucky in 1785, from part of Lincoln County
- Mason County, Kentucky in 1788, from part of Bourbon County
- Woodford County, Kentucky in 1788, from part of Fayette County

These nine counties gained statehood in 1792 as the Commonwealth of Kentucky.

=== Former counties created by the Commonwealth of Kentucky ===
- Beckham County, Kentucky (1904) was dissolved by the Kentucky Court of Appeals on April 29, 1904, because it was not created in conformance with state law

(Josh Bell County, Kentucky (1867–1873), originally named for Joshua Fry Bell, was called simply Bell County beginning in 1873.)

== Louisiana ==
The Territory of Orleans was divided into 12 counties on 10 Apr 1805; these were reorganized into parishes on 31 Mar 1807:

- Acadia County, Orleans Territory
- Attakapas County, Orleans Territory
- Concordia County, Orleans Territory
- German Coast, Orleans Territory
- Iberville County, Orleans Territory
- LaFourche County, Orleans Territory
- Natchitoches County, Orleans Territory
- Opelousas County, Orleans Territory
- Orleans County, Orleans Territory
- Ouachita County, Orleans Territory
- Pointe Coupée County, Orleans Territory
- Rapides County, Orleans Territory

=== Former parishes ===
- Biloxi Parish formed in 1811 from West Florida territory. It was eliminated in 1812 when part of the former West Florida area was transferred to Mississippi Territory.
- Carroll Parish formed in 1838 from part of Ouachita Parish. In 1877, it was divided into East Carroll Parish and West Carroll Parish.
- Feliciana Parish formed in 1810 from West Florida territory. In 1824, it was divided into East Feliciana Parish and West Feliciana Parish.
- Pascagoula Parish formed in 1811 from West Florida territory. It was eliminated in 1812 when part of the former West Florida area was transferred to Mississippi Territory.
- Warren Parish formed in 1811 from part of Concordia Parish, and merged into Concordia Parish and Ouachita Parish in 1814.

== Maine ==
- Cornwall County, Province of New York, established 1665, transferred to the Dominion of New England in 1686; to the Province of Massachusetts Bay in 1692 and absorbed into York County (see below).
- Devonshire County, Massachusetts Bay Colony (1674–1675)

=== Counties organized by Massachusetts in the future State of Maine ===
The following counties of Massachusetts were organized by the 1780 constitution into the District of Maine, which became a state in 1820:

- York County, Massachusetts, created 1652 as "Yorkshire County" and renamed "York County" in 1668
- Lincoln County, Massachusetts, created 1760
- Cumberland County, Massachusetts, created 1761
- Hancock County, Massachusetts, created 1790
- Washington County, Massachusetts, created 1790
- Kennebec County, Massachusetts, created 1799
- Oxford County, Massachusetts, created 1805
- Somerset County, Massachusetts, created 1809
- Penobscot County, Massachusetts, created 1817

See also Massachusetts, below.

== Maryland ==
- Charles County: formed in 1650 from part of Saint Mary's County. Abolished in 1654. Referred to as Old Charles County.
- Durham County: formed in 1669 from part of Somerset County and nonorganized territory. Abolished in 1672 and incorporated in Worcester County. Originally also included portions of Maryland's claim to Delaware.
- Worcester County: formed in 1672 from part of Durham County and nonorganized territory. Lost in 1685 when Delaware Colony was established.

== Massachusetts ==
=== Former counties of the colonial era ===
- Norfolk County, Massachusetts Bay Colony, an original county of the Massachusetts Bay Colony, established 1643; divided in 1680 between Essex County and the newly formed Province of New Hampshire; no connection with the Norfolk County organized in 1793
- Devonshire County, Massachusetts Bay Colony (1674–1675)

=== Counties transferred from other colonies ===
- Cornwall County, Province of New York, transferred to Massachusetts in 1686
- Dukes County, Province of New York, transferred to Massachusetts in 1691

=== Counties organized by Massachusetts in the future State of Maine ===
The following counties of Massachusetts were organized by the 1780 constitution into the District of Maine, which became a state in 1820:

- York County, Massachusetts, created 1652 as "Yorkshire County" and renamed "York County" in 1668
- Lincoln County, Massachusetts, created 1760
- Cumberland County, Massachusetts, created 1761
- Hancock County, Massachusetts, created 1790
- Washington County, Massachusetts, created 1790
- Kennebec County, Massachusetts, created 1799
- Oxford County, Massachusetts, created 1805
- Somerset County, Massachusetts, created 1809
- Penobscot County, Massachusetts, created 1817

== Michigan ==
=== Revolutionary era ===
- Illinois County, Virginia, formed 1778 in support of Virginia's claim to present-day Illinois, Indiana, Michigan, Ohio, Wisconsin and eastern Minnesota; abolished 5 January 1782; territory ceded by Virginia to Congress in March 1784. Throughout this time, Detroit and Fort St. Joseph (present-day Niles, Michigan) were occupied by British forces, and Virginia's jurisdiction in the region was therefore limited to the French settlements of Cahokia, Kaskaskia and Vincennes, far to the south of Michigan.

=== Former counties of the Northwest, Indiana and Illinois territories ===
- Wayne County, Northwest Territory, proclaimed on August 15, 1796 following the British evacuation of Detroit; out of portions of Hamilton County, Northwest Territory and unorganized land. This first Wayne County originally encompassed all of Michigan's Lower Peninsula, including northwestern Ohio, northern Indiana, and a small portion of the present Lake Michigan shoreline of Illinois, the site of present-day Chicago. In 1800, the area west of the extension of the present Indiana–Ohio border became part of Knox County, Indiana Territory, and a section in the east of the county's Ohio lands was included as part of the new Trumbull County. This first Wayne County was split upon Ohio's achievement of statehood in 1803; north of the Ordinance Line became part of Indiana Territory as a reorganized Wayne County; the county's remaining lands in Ohio briefly reverted to an unorganized status.
- Wayne County, Indiana Territory, established 1803 as a revival of the former county government, and included in Michigan Territory upon its creation in 1805.
- Knox County, Indiana Territory, established as Knox County, Northwest Territory in 1790; upon the organization of Indiana Territory, Knox County was enlarged to take in the western side of the Lower Peninsula and a large slice of the Upper Peninsula. It is unknown if Knox County ever exercised jurisdiction over its lands in the future Michigan.
- St. Clair County, Indiana Territory, established as St. Clair County, Northwest Territory in 1790; upon the organization of Indiana Territory, St. Clair County was enlarged to take in the western portion of the Upper Peninsula. When Illinois Territory was set off from the Indiana Territory in 1809, St. Clair County was included in the new government. It can be presumed that this St. Clair County never exercised jurisdiction over its share of the future Michigan, due to the lack of non-native settlers.

Other counties organized by the Illinois Territory between 1809 and 1819, including Madison, Crawford, Bond, and Edwards, notionally included parts of the future Michigan and Wisconsin territories in their boundaries, but do not appear to have exercised jurisdiction north of the current state line.

=== Former districts of Michigan Territory ===
The first governor of Michigan Territory, William Hull, declared a county government into existence shortly after assuming power in 1805, but on the same day, ordered that four districts be organized:

- District of Detroit, the area surrounding the settlement at Detroit; in practice, this district was combined with the Huron district.
- District of Erie, the area south of the Huron River and centered on present-day Monroe
- District of Huron, the area north of Detroit, encompassing today's Thumb (Michigan) and Mid-Michigan
- District of Michilimackinac, centered on the Straits of Mackinac and covering the northern half of the Lower Peninsula

Judicial acts and militia organization took place at the district level; the vestigial county government was never organized. District government lapsed after the British occupation of Detroit and Mackinac in 1812; following the recapture of Detroit in 1813, Hull's replacement as governor (by American reckoning), Lewis Cass, abolished the district scheme. In 1815, the current Wayne County was organized; the county government traces its lineage to the 1796 county of that name.

=== Former counties of Michigan Territory ===
- Brown County, Michigan Territory, organized 1818, transferred to Wisconsin Territory in 1836, now Brown County, Wisconsin
- Crawford County, Michigan Territory, organized 1818, transferred to Wisconsin Territory in 1836, now Crawford County, Wisconsin
- Des Moines County, Michigan Territory, organized 1834, transferred to Wisconsin Territory in 1836 and Iowa Territory in 1838, now Des Moines County, Iowa
- Dubuque County, Michigan Territory, organized 1834, transferred to Wisconsin Territory in 1836 and Iowa Territory in 1838, now Dubuque County, Iowa
- Iowa County, Michigan Territory, organized 1829, transferred to Wisconsin Territory in 1836, now Iowa County, Wisconsin
- Milwaukee County, Michigan Territory, organized 1835, transferred to Wisconsin Territory in 1836, now Milwaukee County, Wisconsin

=== Former counties of the State of Michigan ===
- Isle Royale County, Michigan, abolished in 1897, assigned to Keweenaw County, Michigan
- Manitou County, Michigan, abolished in 1895, divided between Charlevoix and Leelanau counties
- Washington County, Michigan, formed in 1867 from Marquette County, Michigan but declared unconstitutional
- Wyandot County, Michigan, 1840 to 1853, now Cheboygan County, Michigan.

See also List of counties in Michigan

== Minnesota ==
- Manomin County, Minnesota (1857–1858) disorganized and shifted between three counties it became part of Anoka County in 1869–1870
- Monongalia County, Minnesota (1861–1870) merged with Kandiyohi County
- Pembina County, Minnesota Territory (1849–1858, reconstituted as Pembina County, Dakota Territory in 1861, eventually reduced to present-day Pembina County, North Dakota.)

== Mississippi ==
- Bainbridge County, Mississippi (1823–1824)
- Pearl County, Mississippi (1872–1878), later reformed as Pearl River County in 1890

Jefferson County was originally organized as Pickering County, Mississippi Territory. Three Alabama counties were established in the Mississippi Territory that preceded the two states: Baldwin County, Alabama; Madison County, Alabama; Washington County, Alabama.

== Missouri ==
- Clark County, Missouri (1818–1819) (Not the same as the current Clark County, Missouri)
- Dodge County, Missouri (1849–1853)
- Hempstead County, Missouri (1818–1819)
- Lillard County, Missouri (1821–1825)

== Montana ==
- Edgerton County, Montana, created by the Territorial Legislature in 1865, renamed Lewis and Clark County in 1867

== Nevada ==
- Bullfrog County, Nevada, created from a small portion of Nye County, Nevada in 1987, reabsorbed in 1989. The county had zero population and was intended to ensure that if the Federal government sited a nuclear waste depository there, any revenue would go to the state rather than to Nye County.
- Ormsby County, Nevada, now independent city of Carson City
- Pautah County, California – created by the California legislature out of territory the state believed would be ceded to it north of Lake Tahoe, but which was given to Nevada. County never officially organized.
- Roop County, Nevada – Portions west of 120°W became Lassen County, California, remainder annexed by Washoe County, Nevada in 1883. Also known as Lake County.

== New Hampshire ==
- Norfolk County, Massachusetts Colony (1643–1679) – became Essex County, Massachusetts and the entire state of New Hampshire.

== New Mexico ==
- Santa Ana County, New Mexico Territory (1844–1876) absorbed by Bernalillo County

== New York ==
- Charlotte County, Province of New York (renamed and partitioned). See Washington County, New York.
- Cornwall County, Province of New York (transferred to Massachusetts in 1686).
- Cumberland County, Province of New York (claimed by and transferred to Vermont, unclear if ever implemented or administered). See Albany County, New York.
- Dukes County, Province of New York (transferred to Massachusetts in 1691).
- Gloucester County, New York (claimed by and transferred to Vermont, unclear if ever implemented or administered).
- Tryon County, New York (renamed and partitioned). See also: Montgomery County, New York
- Yorkshire County, Province of New York (original English county, partitioned in 1683 into Kings, Queens (including modern Nassau), Suffolk, Richmond and Westchester (including modern Bronx) counties.)

== North Carolina ==
=== Counties formed by the colonial government ===
- Albemarle County, North Carolina, created 1664, abolished 1739
- Bath County, North Carolina, created 1696, abolished 1739
- Bute County, North Carolina, created 1764, divided in 1779 into Franklin and Warren counties
- Clarendon County, North Carolina, created 1664, abolished 1667
- Dobbs County, North Carolina, created 1758, effective 1759; lost territory to Wayne County in 1779, remainder of county divided in 1791 between Glasgow (see below) and Lenoir counties
- Tryon County, North Carolina created 1768, effective 1769; divided in 1779 into Lincoln and Rutherford counties

=== Counties transferred to Federal jurisdiction, 1790 ===
Seven counties were established by the State of North Carolina in its western territories following independence; the entire overmountain area (the former Washington District), was transferred to Federal jurisdiction in 1790 and formed into the Territory South of the River Ohio. The so-called Southwest Territory would achieve statehood in 1796, as Tennessee.

- Washington County, North Carolina, established 1777 (not to be confused with the present-day Washington County, NC, which was created in 1799 from Tyrrell County, though both counties are named for the same person).
- Sullivan County, North Carolina, established 1779
- Davidson County, North Carolina, established 1783 (not to be confused with the present-day Davidson County, NC, which was created in 1822 from Rowan County, though both counties are named for the same person).
- Greene County, North Carolina, established 1783 (not to be confused with the present-day Greene County, NC, which was created in 1791 from Dobbs County, though both counties are named for the same person).
- Hawkins County, North Carolina, established 1786
- Sumner County, North Carolina, established 1786
- Tennessee County, established 1788, divided at Tennessee statehood in 1796 into Montgomery County, Tennessee and Robertson County, Tennessee

=== Renamed counties ===
- Glasgow County, North Carolina – renamed Greene County in 1798.

== North Dakota ==
- Pembina County, Minnesota Territory (1849–1858, reconstituted as Pembina County, Dakota Territory in 1861, eventually reduced to present-day Pembina County, North Dakota.)
- Wallace County, North Dakota (1883–1889 under Dakota Territory, 1889–1896, 1901–1905 under North Dakota, created from Howard County, Dakota Territory, extinct in 1896 from Billings and Stark counties, recreated in 1901 but again absorbed into McKenzie county in 1905.)

== Ohio ==
- Illinois County, Virginia, formed in 1778 and constituted most of present-day Illinois, Indiana, Michigan, Ohio, and Wisconsin; abolished 5 January 1782; territory ceded by Virginia to Congress in March 1784; see Illinois Country.
- Ohio has had two counties called Wayne County. The present-day Wayne County, Ohio was established in 1812. The original county called Wayne County was in another part of the state, and included no portion of present-day Wayne County.

== Oklahoma ==
- Swanson County, Oklahoma (1910–1911)

=== Indian Territory ===
==== Chickasaw Nation ====
- Tishomingo County
- Pontotoc County
- Pickens County
- Ponola County

==== Choctaw Nation ====
- Apukshunnubbee District:
  - Bok Tuklo County
  - Cedar County
  - Eagle County
  - Nashoba County
  - Red River County
  - Towson County
  - Wade County
- Moshulatubbee District
  - Gaines County
  - Sans Bois County
  - Skullyville County
  - Sugar Loaf County
  - Tobucksy County
- Pushmataha District
  - Atoka County
  - Blue County
  - Jack's Fork County
  - Jackson County
  - Kiamitia County (Kiamichi County)

=== Oklahoma Territory ===
- Beaver County, Oklahoma Territory
- Day County, Oklahoma Territory Abolished at Oklahoma statehood. Split into Roger Mills County and Ellis County
- Greer County, Texas (1888–1895, transferred to Oklahoma Territory under a Supreme Court decision)

== Oregon ==
- Umpqua County, Oregon created 1851, gradually reduced in size until 1862, when what remained was incorporated into Douglas County
- Champooik or Champoeg County, one of the four original districts into which the Oregon Country was divided in 1843; Renamed Marion County in 1849.
- Twality, Tuality or Falatine County, one of the four original districts into which the Oregon Country was divided in 1843; Renamed Washington County in 1849.

== Pennsylvania ==
- Ontario County (1810–1812) renamed as Bradford County.
- Jefferson County renamed as Lycoming County.

== South Carolina ==
Note: South Carolina legally dissolved all overarching "districts" (which often included multiple counties) in 1800. Nevertheless, surviving counties were often referred to incorrectly as "districts" as late as the 1860s.

- Bartholomew County created in 1785 from Charleston District. Abolished 1791.
- Beaufort District created in 1768 from Granville County. Abolished 1800.
- Berkeley (1) County created in 1682 from Craven County. Abolished 1768.
- Berkeley (2) County created in 1785 from Charleston District. Abolished 1791. The third version of Berkeley County was created in 1882 and remains today.
- Camden District created in 1768 from Craven County. Abolished 1800.
- Carteret County created in 1684 from Colleton County. Abolished 1708.
- Charles Town District created in 1768 from Berkeley and Colleton Counties. It was renamed Charleston District in 1785, and abolished in 1800.
- Charleston (1) County created in 1785 from Charleston District. Abolished 1791. A second Charleston County was created in 1800 and remains today.
- Cheraws District created in 1768 from Craven County. Abolished 1800.
- Claremont County created in 1785 from Camden County. Abolished 1800.
- Clarendon (1) County created in 1785 from Camden County. Its county seat was in Jamesville. Abolished 1800. Clarendon (2) County was reestablished in 1855 with its county seat in Manning and remains today.
- Colleton (1) County created in 1682 from Craven County. Abolished 1768.
- Colleton (2) County created in 1785 from Charleston District. Abolished 1791. A third Colleton County was created in 1800 from Charleston District and remains today.
- Craven County was part of Carolina's first charter in 1664. Abolished 1768.
- Georgetown District created in 1768 from Craven County. Abolished 1800.
- Granville (1) County created in 1708 from Carteret County. Abolished 1768.
- Granville (2) County created in 1785 from Beaufort District. Abolished 1791.
- Hilton County created in 1785 from Beaufort District. Abolished 1791.
- Kingston County created in 1785 from Georgetown District. Abolished 1801.
- Lewisburg County created in 1785 from Orangeburg District. Abolished 1791.
- Lexington (1) County created in 1785 from Orangeburg District. Abolished 1791. Lexington (2) County was reestablished in 1804 from Orangeburg County and remains today.
- Liberty County created in 1785 from Georgetown District. Abolished 1798.
- Lincoln County created in 1785 from Beaufort District. Abolished 1791.
- Marion County created in 1785 from Charleston District. Abolished 1791.
- Ninety-six District created in 1768 from Indian lands. Abolished 1800.
- Orangeburgh District created in 1768 from Orangeburgh Township and Amelia Township. Spelling officially changed to Orangeburg District in 1783. Abolished 1800.
- Orange County created in 1785 from Orangeburg District. Abolished 1791. (Note: Orangeburg County was created in 1791 from Orangeburg District and remains today.)
- Pendleton County was created in 1789 from Cherokee Indian lands. It was joined to the overarching Washington District in 1791 along with Greenville County. In 1798 Washington District was renamed Pendleton District an overarching district including Pendleton County and Greenville County. In 1800 South Carolina abolished all the overarching districts. So in 1800 only the separate Pendleton County and Greenville County emerged. The remaining Pendleton County was abolished in 1826.
- Pendleton District was created in 1798 by renaming Washington District. This overarching Pendleton District was dissolved two years later in 1800. However Pendleton County remained and emerged from a part of Pendleton District. Pendleton County was abolished 1826.
- Pinckney District created in 1791 from Ninety-six District and Cheraws District. Abolished 1800.
- Salem County created in 1792 from Claremont County and Clarendon County. Abolished 1800.
- Shrewsbury County created in 1785 from Beaufort District. Abolished 1791.
- Spartan County created in 1785 from Ninety-six District. Changed to Spartanburg County in 1791 and remains today.
- Washington County created in 1785 from Charleston District. Abolished 1791.
- Washington District created in 1791 from Cherokee Indian lands. Washington District included Greenville County (created 1786) and Pendleton County (created 1789) Washington District was renamed in 1798 to Pendleton District.
- Winton County created in 1785 from Orangeburg District. Abolished 1791.
- Winyah County created in 1785 from Georgetown District. Abolished 1800.

== South Dakota ==
- Armstrong County, South Dakota, created as Pyatt County in 1883, renamed to Armstrong in 1895, and merged into Dewey County in 1953.
- Lugenbeel County (1875-1909), divided and merged into Bennett County and Todd County.
- Shannon County, South Dakota (1875–2015) renamed Oglala Lakota County by referendum in 2014.
- Washabaugh County, South Dakota (1889–1979) The eastern part of the Pine Ridge Indian Reservation is now under the control of Jackson County.
- Washington County, South Dakota, a former county (1883–1943) that was divided and then merged into Jackson County, Pennington County and Shannon County in 1943 because of financial troubles in South Dakota

== Tennessee ==
- James County, Tennessee (1870–1919) – Now part of Hamilton County and Bradley County. The county seat was Ooltewah.
- Tennessee County, North Carolina (1788–1796) – A North Carolina county that was divided and renamed Montgomery County and Robertson County when Tennessee achieved statehood to lessen confusion. These counties still exist but were eventually subdivided further.

== Texas ==
- Buchanan County (1858–1861), renamed to Stephens County
- Buchel County (1887–1897, formed from part of Presidio County, absorbed by Brewster County)
- Dawson County (defunct), Texas (1858–1866, became parts of Uvalde and Kinney counties; not to be confused with present-day Dawson County)
- Davis County (1861–1871), reverted to previously named Cass County
- Encinal County (1856–1899, absorbed by Webb County)
- Foley County (1887–1897, formed from part of Presidio County, absorbed by Brewster County)
- Greer County (1888–1895, transferred to Oklahoma Territory under a Supreme Court decision)
- Harrisburg County (1836–1839), renamed to Harris County
- Miller County, Arkansas Territory (1820–1825, became part of Indian Territory and present-day Texas)
- Mina County (1834–1837), renamed to Bastrop County.
- Navasota County (1841–1842), renamed to Brazos County
- Santa Fe County (1848–1850, abolished November 25, 1850; land ceded to United States in compliance with Compromise of 1850)
- Tenehaw County (1835–1836) renamed to Shelby County.
- Wegefarth County (1873–1876, abolished by Texas Legislature)
- Worth County (1850, formed from part of Santa Fe County, abolished November 25, 1850; land ceded to United States in compliance with Compromise of 1850)

== Utah ==
In 1849 most Great Basin settlers asked for admission to the Union as the State of Deseret. In 1850 Congress responded by reducing her size and organizing Utah Territory. In 1896 Utah became a state.

- Carson County, Utah Territory created 1854 from parts of Weber, Desert, Tooele, Juab, Millard, Iron counties. In 1861 Nevada Territory took jurisdiction and Carson County was extinguished. Nevada erected Carson City (Independent City), Douglas, Lake, Lyon, Ormsby, Roop, Storey, Washoe, and parts of Churchill, Esmeralda, Humboldt, Mineral, Nye, and Pershing counties from her land.
- Cedar County, Utah Territory created 1856 from part of Utah County. Discontinued 1862; her land parted into Tooele County and Utah County.
- Desert County, Utah Territory created 1852 extending from Salt Lake to California. Reduced in 1856, extinguished 1862; her land parted into Box Elder and Tooele counties.
- Greasewood County, Utah Territory created 1856 from part of Weber County. Discontinued 1862 and her land given to Box Elder County.
- Great Salt Lake County, Utah Territory created 1850; expanded 1852 to Colorado border; reduced 1856; in 1866 reduced again to her present borders and name changed to Salt Lake County.
- Green River County, Utah Territory created 1852 included big parts of present-day Colorado and Wyoming. Summit County carved out 1854; in 1856 Malad, Box Elder, and Cache counties peeled off, but Green River County expanded into Salt Lake, Utah, and Sanpete counties; 1861 parts of Colorado and Wyoming shaved off; 1862 Morgan and Wasatch counties trimmed off; 1864 Rich County sliced out; 1868 last part of Wyoming cut out; 1872 Green River County was dissolved, and her land ceded to Summit County.
- Humboldt County, Utah Territory formed 1856 from Weber, Desert, Tooele, and Juab counties. Nevada took jurisdiction in 1861 forming her own Humboldt County, Nevada to the northeast. On the former Humboldt County's land, Nevada formed parts of her own Humboldt, Churchill, Elko, Eureka, Lander, and Pershing counties.
- Little Salt Lake County, Utah Territory created 1850 with undefined boundaries on unsettled land. In 1852 the legislature redefined the area as Iron County.
- Malad County, Utah Territory created 1856 from part of Weber County. Discontinued 1862, her land ceded to Box Elder County.
- Richland County, Utah Territory formed 1864 from parts of Cache, Summit, and Green River counties. In 1868 part was given to Wyoming and the rest renamed Rich County.
- Rio Virgen County, Utah Territory created 1869 from Washington County. Discontinued 1872 after a survey showed most of it was in Nevada and Arizona Territory.
- Saint Mary's County, Utah Territory formed 1856 from parts of Weber, Desert, Tooele, and Juab counties. In 1861 Nevada Territory took jurisdiction and Saint Mary's ended. On Saint Mary's land, Nevada created parts of Elko, Eureka, and White Pine counties.
- Shambip County, Utah Territory created 1856 from part of Tooele County. Discontinued 1862 and her land reverted to Tooele County.

== Vermont ==
- Cumberland County, Republic of Vermont (1771–1781)
- Cumberland County, Province of New York (claimed by and transferred to Vermont, unclear if ever implemented or administered). See Albany County, New York.
- Gloucester County, New York (claimed by and transferred to Vermont, unclear if ever implemented or administered).
- Washington County, Republic of Vermont (1781–1782) land now in New Hampshire; Vermont relinquished claim; there is a present-day "new" Washington County, Vermont

== Virginia ==
- Alexandria County, D.C. (retroceded to Virginia, most of which now comprises Arlington County, Virginia with a portion becoming part of Alexandria, Virginia)
- Elizabeth City County, Virginia (incorporated into the independent city of Hampton in 1952)
- Fincastle County, Virginia (land now part of Kentucky)
- Illinois County, Virginia, formed in 1778 and constituted most of present-day Ohio, Indiana, Illinois, Michigan, and Wisconsin; abolished 5 January 1782; territory ceded by Virginia to Congress in March 1784.
- Kentucky County, Virginia (1777–1780) land that later became the state of Kentucky in 1792
- Lower Norfolk County (Colonial Virginia) (in 1691, divided into Norfolk County, Virginia and Princess Anne County, Virginia)
- Nansemond County, Virginia became independent city of Nansemond in 1972; merged with independent city of Suffolk in 1974
- New Norfolk County (Colonial Virginia) Formed in 1636 from Elizabeth River Shire, divided into Lower Norfolk County and Upper Norfolk County in 1637
- Norfolk County, Virginia Formed in 1691 from part of Lower Norfolk County, was merged with independent city of South Norfolk to become new independent city of Chesapeake in 1963
- Old Rappahannock County (Province of Virginia) Founded in 1656 from part of Lancaster County and became extinct in 1692 when it was separated to form Essex County and Richmond County
- Princess Anne County, Virginia (Formed in 1691 from part of Lower Norfolk County, was merged with independent city of Virginia Beach in 1963)
- Upper Norfolk County (Colonial Virginia) (renamed Nansemond County in 1642; see Nansemond County for subsequent history)
- Warwick River County, Virginia (renamed Warwick County in 1642; became independent city of Warwick in 1952; merged with independent city of Newport News in 1958)
- Yohogania County, Virginia (1776–1779) land now in Pennsylvania and West Virginia

== Washington ==
- Chehalis County (1854–1915) renamed as Grays Harbor County.
- Quillehuyte County (1868–1869) merged back into Clallam County and Jefferson County.
- Sawamish County (1854–1864) renamed as Mason County.
- Slaughter County (1857) renamed as Kitsap County.

== West Virginia ==
See Virginia & Virginia Colony, above

== Wisconsin ==
=== Revolutionary-era claims of Virginia ===
- Illinois County, Virginia, formed in 1778 and constituting Virginia's claimed lands in present-day Illinois, Indiana, Michigan, Ohio, and Wisconsin; abolished 5 January 1782; territory ceded by Virginia to Congress in March 1784; see Illinois Country and Northwest Territory. Wisconsin's non-native settlements of this era were peopled by British and Canadian fur traders, and it is unclear if Virginia ever attempted to exercise its jurisdiction in today's Wisconsin.

=== Counties of Wisconsin created by Michigan Territory ===
- Brown County, Michigan Territory, 1818; see Brown County, Wisconsin
- Crawford County, Michigan Territory, 1818; see Crawford County, Wisconsin
- Iowa County, Michigan Territory, 1829; see Iowa County, Wisconsin
- Milwaukee County, Michigan Territory, 1835; see Milwaukee County, Wisconsin

=== Counties of Iowa created by Michigan Territory and transferred to Wisconsin Territory ===
- Des Moines County, Michigan Territory, 1834; see Des Moines County, Iowa
- Dubuque County, Michigan Territory, 1834; see Dubuque County, Iowa

=== Counties of Iowa created by Wisconsin Territory ===
- Henry County, Wisconsin Territory, 1836; see Henry County, Iowa
- Lee County, Wisconsin Territory, 1836; see Lee County, Iowa
- Louisa County, Wisconsin Territory, 1836; see Louisa County, Iowa
- Muscatine County, Wisconsin Territory, 1836; see Muscatine County, Iowa
- Van Buren County, Wisconsin Territory, 1836; see Van Buren County, Iowa
- Henry County, Wisconsin Territory, 1836; see Henry County, Iowa
- Benton County, Wisconsin Territory, 1837; see Benton County, Iowa
- Buchanan County, Wisconsin Territory, 1837; see Buchanan County, Iowa
- Cedar County, Wisconsin Territory, 1837; see Cedar County, Iowa
- Clayton County, Wisconsin Territory, 1837; see Clayton County, Iowa
- Clinton County, Wisconsin Territory, 1837; see Clinton County, Iowa
- Delaware County, Wisconsin Territory, 1837; see Delaware County, Iowa
- Fayette County, Wisconsin Territory, 1837; see Fayette County, Iowa
- Jackson County, Wisconsin Territory, 1837; see Jackson County, Iowa
- Johnson County, Wisconsin Territory, 1837; see Johnson County, Iowa
- Jones County, Wisconsin Territory, 1837; see Jones County, Iowa
- Keokuk County, Wisconsin Territory, 1837; see Keokuk County, Iowa
- Linn County, Wisconsin Territory, 1836; see Linn County, Iowa
- Scott County, Wisconsin Territory, 1837; see Scott County, Iowa
- Slaughter County, Wisconsin Territory, 1838; see Washington County, Iowa

=== Counties of Wisconsin divided after statehood ===
- La Pointe County, Wisconsin, 1848

== Wyoming ==
- Carter County, renamed to Sweetwater County in 1869.
- Pease County, renamed to Johnson County in 1879.

== See also ==
- United States of America
  - Outline of the United States
  - Index of United States-related articles
- Historic regions of the United States
- Atlas of Historical County Boundaries
