= List of counties in Mississippi =

Counties of Mississippi
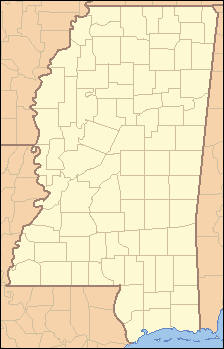
- Location: State of Mississippi
- Number: 82
- Populations: Greatest: 217,136 (Harrison); Least: 1,263 (Issaquena); Average: 36,026 (2025)
- Areas: Largest: 933.9 square miles (2,419 km^{2}) (Yazoo, by land); Smallest: 401.3 square miles (1,039 km^{2}) (Alcorn); Average: 591 square miles (1,530 km^{2})
- Government: County government
- Subdivisions: Cities, towns, unincorporated communities, census-designated places

The U.S. state of Mississippi has 82 counties. The first two counties, Adams County and Pickering County (renamed Jefferson County later), were established in 1799 in the Mississippi Territory. 14 counties, all in the southwest, were created before the Mississippi Territory became a state in 1817. The last county created was Humphreys County in 1918. The Mississippi Constitution governs the creation of new counties, which requires an election of qualified electors to approve of the creation of a new county. Elections are limited to once every four years. Any new county must be at least 400 square miles (1,000 km^{2}), with no existing county reduced below that size.

The county governing body, known as the Board of Supervisors, is located under the judicial branch of state government as established in the 1817 Mississippi Constitution. The 1868 Constitution mandated five-member Board of Supervisors, an evolution of the five-member board of police created in the 1832 Constitution. Supervisors are elected without term limits. County government includes other elected and appointed officials who serve concurrent four-year terms. Major elected officials include the chancery clerk, who manages records and administrative tasks for the supervisors and chancery court; the circuit clerk, who handles election administration duties; and the sheriff, who functions as the chief of county law enforcement. Other elected officials include the constables, justice court judges, and the tax assessor or collector (23 counties have separate officials). Major appointed county officials include the board attorney, the county administrator, the county engineer, and the road manager. Counties have either one of two county seats, depending on the number of court districts.

Through evolving constitutions, counties are granted police powers, administrative duties for transportation infrastructure, and election scheduling for vacancies in county offices. The Board of Supervisors are mandated to additional duties as defined by the legislature. While placed under the judicial branch, the Mississippi Supreme Court recognize counties perform mixed duties that are executive, legislative, and judicial in nature. Prior to 1988, each supervisor independently managed roads and bridges in their assigned area, and would allocate money at their discretion, subject to restrictions in state law. County revenues were divided equally among all five supervisors. However, this came under scrutiny after Operation Pretense (1984–1987), an FBI sting operation targeting corruption that led to the indictment of fifty-five county supervisors. The Mississippi Legislature passed the County Government Reorganization Act of 1988 in response, which transferred responsibilities to a system of centralized road administration.

According to 2025 U.S. census Data, the average population of Mississippi's 82 counties is 36,026, with Harrison County as the most populous (217,136) and Issaquena County the least (1,263). Six counties have populations over 100,000 while 15 have populations under 10,000. Yazoo County is the largest by total area at 933.9 square miles (2,419 km^{2}), and Alcorn County is the smallest at 401.3 square miles (1,039 km^{2}). The average land area is 591 square miles (1,530 km^{2}). 19 counties have names with Native American etymologies.

The Federal Information Processing Standard (FIPS) code is used by the United States Federal government to uniquely identify counties. In the table below, each code links to the U.S. Census "quick facts" page for that county. Mississippi's FIPS state code is 28.

== List of counties ==
| County | FIPS code | County seat | Smithsonian Trinomial | Est. | Origin | Etymology | Population (2025) | Total Area | Map |
|---|---|---|---|---|---|---|---|---|---|
| Adams County | 001 | Natchez | AD | April 2, 1799 | One of two original counties in the Mississippi Territory formed by Governor Winthrop Sargent | John Adams (1735–1826), Founding Father and 2nd U.S. President | 30,061 | 487.9 sq mi (1,264 km^{2}) | State map highlighting Adams County |
| Alcorn County | 003 | Corinth | AL | April 15, 1870 | Formed from Tippiah and Tishomingo Counties | James L. Alcorn (1816–1894), 28th Governor of Mississippi and U.S. Senator | 34,569 | 401.3 sq mi (1,039 km^{2}) | State map highlighting Alcorn County |
| Amite County | 005 | Liberty | AM | February 24, 1809 | Formed from Wilkinson County | Amite River, from potential corruption of Choctaw word for "young" | 12,487 | 731.7 sq mi (1,895 km^{2}) | State map highlighting Amite County |
| Attala County | 007 | Kosciusko | AT | December 23, 1833 | Formed from Madison County | Fictional Native American heroine from the early 19th-century novel Atala by François-René de Chateaubriand | 17,100 | 736.7 sq mi (1,908 km^{2}) | State map highlighting Attala County |
| Benton County | 009 | Ashland | BE | July 21, 1870 | Formed from Marshall and Tippah Counties | Thought to be named for U.S. Senator Thomas Hart Benton, the true namesake is Samuel Benton (1820–1864), Confederate brigadier general | 7,502 | 408.6 sq mi (1,058 km^{2}) | State map highlighting Benton County |
| Bolivar County | 011 | Cleveland, Rosedale | BO | March 1, 1836 | Formed from Tallahatchie and Washington Counties and Unorganized | Simon Bolivar (1783–1830), South American democratic revolutionary | 28,262 | 905.7 sq mi (2,346 km^{2}) | State map highlighting Bolivar County |
| Calhoun County | 013 | Pittsboro | CN | June 8, 1852 | Formed from Chickasaw, Lafayette and Yalobusha Counties | John C. Calhoun (1782–1850), 7th U.S. Vice President | 12,643 | 588 sq mi (1,523 km^{2}) | State map highlighting Calhoun County |
| Carroll County | 015 | Carrollton, Vaiden | CA | December 23, 1833 | Formed from Unorganized and Lowndes, Monroe, and Washington Counties | Charles Carroll (1737–1832), last surviving signer of the Declaration of Independence | 9,226 | 634.5 sq mi (1,643 km^{2}) | State map highlighting Carroll County |
| Chickasaw County | 017 | Houston, Okolona | CS | March 1, 1836 | Formed from Monroe County and Unorganized | Chickasaw Native Americans | 16,730 | 504.3 sq mi (1,306 km^{2}) | State map highlighting Chickasaw County |
| Choctaw County | 019 | Ackerman | CH | December 23, 1833 | Formed from Unorganized and Lowndes, Madison, and Monroe Counties | Choctaw Native Americans | 8,048 | 420.3 sq mi (1,089 km^{2}) | State map highlighting Choctaw County |
| Claiborne County | 021 | Port Gibson | CB | January 27, 1802 | Formed from Jefferson County (originally Pickering County) | William C. C. Claiborne (c. 1773–1775–1817), 2nd Governor of Mississippi Territory | 8,058 | 500.9 sq mi (1,297 km^{2}) | State map highlighting Claiborne County |
| Clarke County | 023 | Quitman | CK | December 23, 1833 | Formed from Wayne County | Joshua G. Clarke (1780–1828), Mississippi Supreme Court Justice and 1st Chancellor of the Mississippi Chancery Courts | 15,102 | 693.4 sq mi (1,796 km^{2}) | State map highlighting Clarke County |
| Clay County | 025 | West Point | CL | May 12, 1871 | Formed from Chickasaw, Lowndes, Monroe and Oktibbeha Counties as Colfax County (Note: From 1871 to 1876, Clay County was named Colfax County after Schuyler Colfax (1823–1885), 17th U.S. Vice President.) | Henry Clay (1777–1852), 9th U.S. Secretary of State and U.S. Senator | 18,238 | 415.9 sq mi (1,077 km^{2}) | State map highlighting Clay County |
| Coahoma County | 027 | Clarksdale | CO | March 1, 1836 | Formed from Unorganized | Named for Chickasaw chief Coahoma | 19,849 | 583.1 sq mi (1,510 km^{2}) | State map highlighting Coahoma County |
| Copiah County | 029 | Hazlehurst | CP | January 21, 1823 | Formed from Franklin, Hinds, and Lawrence Counties | Copiah Creek, from Choctaw for "calling panther" | 27,497 | 779.4 sq mi (2,019 km^{2}) | State map highlighting Copiah County |
| Covington County | 031 | Collins | CV | February 5, 1819 | Formed from Lawrence and Wayne Counties | Leonard Covington (1768–1813), U.S. House Representative and War of 1812 brigadier general | 17,898 | 414.9 sq mi (1,075 km^{2}) | State map highlighting Covington County |
| DeSoto County | 033 | Hernando | DS | March 1, 1836 | Formed from Monroe and Washington Counties | Hernando de Soto (c. 1497–1542), Spanish explorer of the Americas | 197,918 | 497.2 sq mi (1,288 km^{2}) | State map highlighting DeSoto County |
| Forrest County | 035 | Hattiesburg | FO | January 6, 1908 | Formed from Perry County | Nathan B. Forrest (1821–1877), Confederate general and 1st Grand Wizard of the First Ku Klux Klan | 79,034 | 470.2 sq mi (1,218 km^{2}) | State map highlighting Forrest County |
| Franklin County | 037 | Meadville | FR | December 21, 1809 | Formed from Adams, Amite, and Wilkinson Counties | Benjamin Franklin (1706–1790), Founding Father, drafter and signer of the Declaration of Independence, and influential polymath | 7,491 | 566.5 sq mi (1,467 km^{2}) | State map highlighting Franklin County |
| George County | 039 | Lucedale | GE | May 2, 1910 | Formed from Greene and Jackson Counties | James Z. George (1826–1897), U.S. Senator and Confederate colonel | 26,331 | 483.6 sq mi (1,253 km^{2}) | State map highlighting George County |
| Greene County | 041 | Leakesville | GN | December 9, 1811 | Formed from Wayne County | Nathanael Greene (1742–1786), Revolutionary War general | 13,707 | 718.7 sq mi (1,861 km^{2}) | State map highlighting Greene County |
| Grenada County | 043 | Grenada | GR | May 9, 1870 | Formed from Carroll, Choctaw, Tallahatchie and Yalobusha Counties | Spanish province of Granada | 20,868 | 449.4 sq mi (1,164 km^{2}) | State map highlighting Grenada County |
| Hancock County | 045 | Bay St. Louis | HA | December 18, 1812 | Formed from Mobile County (AL) | John Hancock (1737–1793), Founding Father, first signer of the Declaration of Independence, and 4th and 13th President of the Continental Congress | 46,873 | 484 sq mi (1,254 km^{2}) | State map highlighting Hancock County |
| Harrison County | 047 | Gulfport, Biloxi | HR | May 3, 1841 | Formed from Hancock and Jackson Counties | William Henry Harrison (1773–1841), 9th U.S. President | 217,136 | 584.5 sq mi (1,514 km^{2}) | State map highlighting Harrison County |
| Hinds County | 049 | Jackson, Raymond | HI | February 12, 1821 | Formed from Unorganized land | Thomas Hinds (1780–1840), U.S. House Representative and War of 1812 major general | 211,888 | 877.3 sq mi (2,272 km^{2}) | State map highlighting Hinds County |
| Holmes County | 051 | Lexington | HO | May 6, 1833 | Formed from Yazoo County | David Holmes (1769–1832), 1st and 5th Governor of Mississippi and U.S. Senator | 15,465 | 764.5 sq mi (1,980 km^{2}) | State map highlighting Holmes County |
| Humphreys County | 053 | Belzoni | HU | May 31, 1918 | Formed from Holmes, Sharkey, Sunflower, Washington and Yazoo Counties | Benjamin G. Humphreys (1808–1882), 26th Governor of Mississippi and Confederate brigadier general | 7,001 | 431.3 sq mi (1,117 km^{2}) | State map highlighting Humphreys County |
| Issaquena County | 055 | Mayersville | IS | January 23, 1844 | Formed from Washington County | Issaquena Creek, from Choctaw for "deer river" | 1,263 | 436.7 sq mi (1,131 km^{2}) | State map highlighting Issaquena County |
| Itawamba County | 057 | Fulton | IT | March 1, 1836 | Formed from Monroe County | Itawamba (c. 1759–1834), Chickasaw chief | 24,152 | 540.4 sq mi (1,400 km^{2}) | State map highlighting Itawamba County |
| Jackson County | 059 | Pascagoula | JA | December 18, 1812 | Formed from Mobile County (AL) | Andrew Jackson (1767–1845), 7th U.S. President and War of 1812 commander | 147,666 | 740.8 sq mi (1,919 km^{2}) | State map highlighting Jackson County |
| Jasper County | 061 | Bay Springs, Paulding | JS | December 23, 1833 | Formed from Jones and Wayne Counties | William Jasper (c. 1750–1779), Revolutionary War sergeant | 15,785 | 677.4 sq mi (1,754 km^{2}) | State map highlighting Jasper County |
| Jefferson County | 063 | Fayette | JE | April 2, 1799 | Originally known as Pickering, (Note: From 1799 to 1802, Jefferson County was named Pickering County after Timothy Pickering (1745–1829), 3rd U.S. Secretary of State.) one of two original counties in the Mississippi Territory formed by Governor Winthrop Sargent | Thomas Jefferson (1743–1826), Founding Father, 3rd U.S. President, and primary author of the Declaration of Independence | 6,825 | 527.1 sq mi (1,365 km^{2}) | State map highlighting Jefferson County |
| Jefferson Davis County | 065 | Prentiss | JD | June 4, 1906 | Formed from Covington and Lawrence Counties | Jefferson Davis (1808–1889), 1st Confederate States President and U.S. Senator | 10,941 | 409.2 sq mi (1,060 km^{2}) | State map highlighting Jefferson Davis County |
| Jones County | 067 | Laurel, Ellisville | JO | January 24, 1826 | Formed from Covington and Wayne Counties | John Paul Jones (1747–1792), Revolutionary War naval captain who is known as the "Father of the American Navy" (Note: From 1865 to 1869, Jones County was renamed Davis County in honor of Jefferson Davis (1808–1889), 1st Confederate States President and U.S. Senator.) | 66,496 | 699.7 sq mi (1,812 km^{2}) | State map highlighting Jones County |
| Kemper County | 069 | De Kalb | KE | December 23, 1833 | Formed from Lowndes, Rankin and Wayne Counties | Reuben Kemper (1771–1827), American pioneer and revolutionary in Spanish Florida | 8,600 | 767 sq mi (1,987 km^{2}) | State map highlighting Kemper County |
| Lafayette County | 071 | Oxford | LA | March 1, 1836 | Formed from Monroe County | Marquis de la Fayette (1757–1834), French-born Revolutionary War general | 59,597 | 679.3 sq mi (1,759 km^{2}) | State map highlighting Lafayette County |
| Lamar County | 073 | Purvis | LM | March 30, 1904 | Formed from Marion and Pearl River Counties | Lucius Q. C. Lamar (1825–1893), Confederate colonel, U.S. Senator, United States Secretary of the Interior, and Associate Justice of the Supreme Court of the United States | 67,403 | 500.4 sq mi (1,296 km^{2}) | State map highlighting Lamar County |
| Lauderdale County | 075 | Meridian | LD | December 23, 1833 | Formed from Rankin and Wayne Counties | James Lauderdale (1768–1814), War of 1812 colonel | 70,317 | 715.3 sq mi (1,853 km^{2}) | State map highlighting Lauderdale County |
| Lawrence County | 077 | Monticello | LW | December 22, 1814 | Formed from Marion County | James Lawrence (1781–1813), War of 1812 naval captain of the USS Chesapeake | 11,819 | 435.8 sq mi (1,129 km^{2}) | State map highlighting Lawrence County |
| Leake County | 079 | Carthage | LK | December 23, 1833 | Formed from Madison and Rankin Counties | Walter Leake (1762–1825), 3rd Governor of Mississippi and U.S. Senator | 21,662 | 585.4 sq mi (1,516 km^{2}) | State map highlighting Leake County |
| Lee County | 081 | Tupelo | LE | December 10, 1866 | Formed from Itawamba and Pontotoc Counties | Robert E. Lee (1807–1870), General in Chief of the Armies of the Confederate States | 83,731 | 453.1 sq mi (1,174 km^{2}) | State map highlighting Lee County |
| Leflore County | 083 | Greenwood | LF | March 15, 1871 | Formed from Carroll and Sunflower Counties | Greenwood LeFlore (1800–1865), Chief of the Choctaw Nation and state senator and representative | 25,686 | 606.3 sq mi (1,570 km^{2}) | State map highlighting Leflore County |
| Lincoln County | 085 | Brookhaven | LI | April 7, 1870 | Formed from Amite, Copiah, Franklin, Lawrence and Pike Counties | Abraham Lincoln (1809–1865), 16th U.S. President | 35,012 | 588.2 sq mi (1,523 km^{2}) | State map highlighting Lincoln County |
| Lowndes County | 087 | Columbus | LO | January 30, 1830 | Formed from Monroe County and Unorganized | William Jones Lowndes (1782–1822), U.S. House Representative | 57,346 | 516.3 sq mi (1,337 km^{2}) | State map highlighting Lowndes County |
| Madison County | 089 | Canton | MD | January 29, 1828 | Formed from Yazoo County | James Madison (1751–1836), Founding Father, 4th U.S. President, and "Father of the Constitution" | 116,298 | 742.2 sq mi (1,922 km^{2}) | State map highlighting Madison County |
| Marion County | 091 | Columbia | MA | December 9, 1811 | Formed from Unorganized and Amite, Franklin and Wayne Counties | Francis Marion (c. 1732–1795), Revolutionary War lieutenant colonel | 24,001 | 548.7 sq mi (1,421 km^{2}) | State map highlighting Marion County |
| Marshall County | 093 | Holly Springs | MR | March 1, 1836 | Formed from Monroe County | John Marshall (1755–1835), Chief Justice of the United States who shaped the Supreme Court's power | 34,654 | 709.7 sq mi (1,838 km^{2}) | State map highlighting Marshall County |
| Monroe County | 095 | Aberdeen | MO | February 9, 1821 | Formed from Unorganized land | James Monroe (1758–1831), Founding Father and 5th U.S. President | 33,318 | 772.1 sq mi (2,000 km^{2}) | State map highlighting Monroe County |
| Montgomery County | 097 | Winona | MT | May 13, 1871 | Formed from Carroll and Choctaw Counties | Richard Montgomery (1738–1775), Revolutionary War major general | 9,354 | 407.8 sq mi (1,056 km^{2}) | State map highlighting Montgomery County |
| Neshoba County | 099 | Philadelphia | NE | December 23, 1833 | Formed from Jones, Madison, Rankin and Wayne Counties | Choctaw for "wolf" | 28,732 | 571.7 sq mi (1,481 km^{2}) | State map highlighting Neshoba County |
| Newton County | 101 | Decatur | NW | February 25, 1836 | Formed from Neshoba County | Isaac Newton (1642–1726/27), English polymath who was a key figure in the Scientific Revolution and the Enlightenment | 20,960 | 579.6 sq mi (1,501 km^{2}) | State map highlighting Newton County |
| Noxubee County | 103 | Macon | NO | December 23, 1833 | Formed from Lowndes and Rankin Counties | Noxubee River, from Choctaw for “to smell as newly caught fish; to stink, as fish", "strong smelling", or "offensive odor" | 9,798 | 700.1 sq mi (1,813 km^{2}) | State map highlighting Noxubee County |
| Oktibbeha County | 105 | Starkville | OK | December 23, 1833 | Formed from Lowndes County | Tibbee Creek, from Choctaw for "fighting water" or "blocks of ice therein" | 51,896 | 462 sq mi (1,197 km^{2}) | State map highlighting Oktibbeha County |
| Panola County | 107 | Batesville, Sardis | PA | March 1, 1836 | Formed from Monroe and Washington Counties and Unorganized | Choctaw for "cotton" | 32,691 | 705.2 sq mi (1,826 km^{2}) | State map highlighting Panola County |
| Pearl River County | 109 | Poplarville | PR | February 22, 1890 | Formed from Hancock and Marion Counties | Pearl River | 59,363 | 819.1 sq mi (2,121 km^{2}) | State map highlighting Pearl River County |
| Perry County | 111 | New Augusta | PE | February 3, 1820 | Formed from Greene County | Oliver Hazard Perry (1785–1819), War of 1812 naval captain | 11,577 | 650.2 sq mi (1,684 km^{2}) | State map highlighting Perry County |
| Pike County | 113 | Magnolia | PI | December 9, 1815 | Formed from Marion County | Zebulon Pike (1779–1813), western explorer and War of 1812 brigadier general | 38,712 | 410.6 sq mi (1,063 km^{2}) | State map highlighting Pike County |
| Pontotoc County | 115 | Pontotoc | PO | March 1, 1836 | Formed from Monroe County | Chickasaw name for a nearby creek, meaning "hanging grapes" or "cattail prairie" | 32,096 | 501 sq mi (1,298 km^{2}) | State map highlighting Pontotoc County |
| Prentiss County | 117 | Booneville | PS | April 15, 1870 | Formed from Itawamba and Tishomingo Counties | Seargent Smith Prentiss (1808–1850), U.S. House Representative | 25,284 | 418.2 sq mi (1,083 km^{2}) | State map highlighting Prentiss County |
| Quitman County | 119 | Marks | QU | February 1, 1877 | Formed from Coahoma, Panola, Tallahatchie and Tunica Counties | John A. Quitman (1798–1858), 10th and 16th Governor of Mississippi and U.S. House Representative | 5,364 | 406.4 sq mi (1,053 km^{2}) | State map highlighting Quitman County |
| Rankin County | 121 | Brandon | RA | February 4, 1828 | Formed from Hinds County | Christopher Rankin (1788–1826), U.S. House Representative | 162,181 | 805.9 sq mi (2,087 km^{2}) | State map highlighting Rankin County |
| Scott County | 123 | Forest | SC | December 23, 1833 | Formed from Covington, Jones and Rankin Counties | Abram M. Scott (1785–1833), 7th Governor of Mississippi | 28,073 | 610.4 sq mi (1,581 km^{2}) | State map highlighting Scott County |
| Sharkey County | 125 | Rolling Fork | SH | March 29, 1876 | Formed from Issaquena and Washington Counties | William L. Sharkey (1798–1873), 25th Governor of Mississippi and Mississippi Supreme Court justice | 3,097 | 435.3 sq mi (1,127 km^{2}) | State map highlighting Sharkey County |
| Simpson County | 127 | Mendenhall | SI | January 23, 1824 | Formed from Copiah County | Josiah Simpson, Mississippi Territory judge and delegate to the 1817 Mississippi Constitutional Convention | 25,498 | 590.5 sq mi (1,529 km^{2}) | State map highlighting Simpson County |
| Smith County | 129 | Raleigh | SM | December 23, 1833 | Formed from Covington, Jones and Rankin Counties | David Smith, Revolutionary War major | 13,991 | 637.3 sq mi (1,651 km^{2}) | State map highlighting Smith County |
| Stone County | 131 | Wiggins | ST | May 10, 1916 | Formed from Harrison County | John M. Stone (1830–1900), 31st and 33rd Governor of Mississippi | 19,654 | 448.1 sq mi (1,161 km^{2}) | State map highlighting Stone County |
| Sunflower County | 133 | Indianola | SU | February 15, 1844 | Formed from Bolivar County | Sunflower River | 22,893 | 706.9 sq mi (1,831 km^{2}) | State map highlighting Sunflower County |
| Tallahatchie County | 135 | Charleston, Sumner | TL | December 23, 1833 | Formed from Washington and Monroe Counties and Unorganized | Tallahatchie River, from Choctaw for "river of the rock" | 10,877 | 652.2 sq mi (1,689 km^{2}) | State map highlighting Tallahatchie County |
| Tate County | 137 | Senatobia | TA | April 15, 1873 | Formed from DeSoto and Marshall Counties | Thomas Simpson Tate, one of the county's original settlers | 28,725 | 411 sq mi (1,064 km^{2}) | State map highlighting Tate County |
| Tippah County | 139 | Ripley | TI | March 1, 1836 | Formed from Monroe County | Chickasaw for "cut off" | 21,389 | 459.9 sq mi (1,191 km^{2}) | State map highlighting Tippah County |
| Tishomingo County | 141 | Iuka | TS | March 1, 1836 | Formed from Monroe County | Chief Tishomingo (c.1735–c.1837), Chickasaw chief | 18,639 | 444.6 sq mi (1,152 km^{2}) | State map highlighting Tishomingo County |
| Tunica County | 143 | Tunica | TU | March 1, 1836 | Formed from Washington County and Unorganized | Tunica Native Americans | 8,819 | 480.8 sq mi (1,245 km^{2}) | State map highlighting Tunica County |
| Union County | 145 | New Albany | UN | July 7, 1870 | Formed from Lee, Pontotoc and Tippah Counties | Reunion of Confederacy with the United States | 28,459 | 416.9 sq mi (1,080 km^{2}) | State map highlighting Union County |
| Walthall County | 147 | Tylertown | WL | April 25, 1914 (Note: Walthall was formed in 1910; however, because of a legal technicality, its government was not formed until 1914.) | Formed from Marion and Pike Counties | Edward Walthall (1831–1898), Confederate general and U.S. Senator | 13,928 | 404.3 sq mi (1,047 km^{2}) | State map highlighting Walthall County |
| Warren County | 149 | Vicksburg | WR | December 22, 1809 | Formed from Claiborne County and Unorganized | Joseph Warren (1741–1775), Founding Father and Revolutionary War general | 41,759 | 620.1 sq mi (1,606 km^{2}) | State map highlighting Warren County |
| Washington County | 151 | Greenville | WS | January 29, 1827 | Formed from Warren and Yazoo Counties | George Washington (1732–1799), Founding Father and 1st U.S. President | 40,446 | 760.9 sq mi (1,971 km^{2}) | State map highlighting Washington County |
| Wayne County | 153 | Waynesboro | WA | December 21, 1809 | Formed from Washington County (AL) | Anthony Wayne (1745–1796), Revolutionary War major general and Senior Officer of the United States Army | 19,807 | 813.5 sq mi (2,107 km^{2}) | State map highlighting Wayne County |
| Webster County | 155 | Walthall | WE | April 6, 1874 | Formed from Chickasaw, Choctaw and Montgomery Counties as Sumner County (Note: From 1874 to 1882, Webster County was named Sumner County after Charles Sumner (1811–1874), U.S. Senator and leading advocate of abolition.) | Daniel Webster (1782–1852), 14th and 19th U.S. Secretary of State and U.S. Senator | 10,167 | 422.8 sq mi (1,095 km^{2}) | State map highlighting Webster County |
| Wilkinson County | 157 | Woodville | WK | January 30, 1802 | Formed from Adams County | James Wilkinson (1757–1825), Revolutionary War general, Senior Officer of the United States Army, and double agent for the Kingdom of Spain | 7,582 | 687.2 sq mi (1,780 km^{2}) | State map highlighting Wilkinson County |
| Winston County | 159 | Louisville | WI | December 23, 1833 | Formed from Lowndes, Madison, and Rankin Counties | Louis L. Winston (1784–1824), Mississippi Supreme Court justice | 17,473 | 610.1 sq mi (1,580 km^{2}) | State map highlighting Winston County |
| Yalobusha County | 161 | Water Valley, Coffeeville | YA | December 23, 1833 | Formed from Monroe and Washington Counties and Unorganized | Yalobusha River, from Choctaw meaning "tadpole place" | 12,375 | 495 sq mi (1,282 km^{2}) | State map highlighting Yalobusha County |
| Yazoo County | 163 | Yazoo City | YZ | January 21, 1823 | Formed from Hinds County | Yazoo River, named for the Yazoo people | 22,947 | 933.9 sq mi (2,419 km^{2}) | State map highlighting Yazoo County |

== Former counties ==
List of former counties
| County | Established | Abolished | Notes | Ref. |
|---|---|---|---|---|
| Bainbridge County | January 17, 1823 | January 21, 1824 | Created from Covington County, it was eventually subsumed back into it a year later. | |
| Pearl County | February 21, 1872 | February 28, 1878 | Created from Hancock County, it gained territory from Marion County before being subsumed back into Hancock and Marion. Because of financial problems and a sparse population, Pearl County was abolished. | |

== See also ==
- List of municipalities in Mississippi
- List of census-designated places in Mississippi
