= Pascagoula (disambiguation) =

The Pascagoula were an indigenous group living in coastal Mississippi.

Pascagoula may also refer to:

- Pascagoula, Mississippi – a city in the United States
- Pascagoula metropolitan area
- Pascagoula River – a river in Mississippi
- Pascagoula Parish, Louisiana - a former parish of the Territory of Orleans
- Pascagoula Abduction, an alien event
- Pascagoula station, closed intercity train station in Pascagoula, Mississippi, United States
- Naval Station Pascagoula, base of the United States Navy, in Pascagoula, Mississippi, closed in 2006
