= Name of Tennessee =

History of the state's toponym

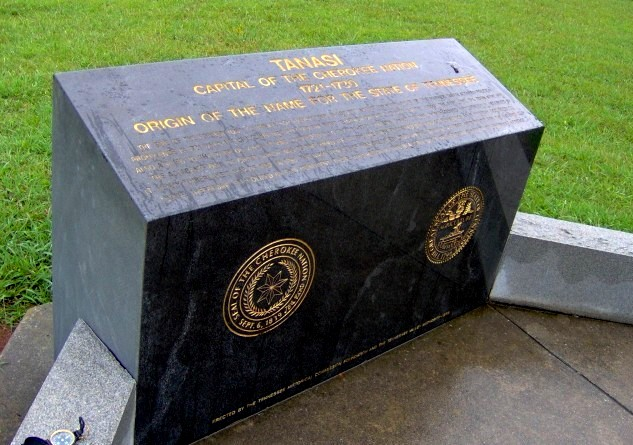
Monument near the old site of Tanasi in Monroe County

The earliest known written variant of the name that became Tennessee was recorded by Spanish explorer Captain Juan Pardo when he and his men passed through a Native American village named "Tanasqui" in 1567 while traveling inland from modern-day South Carolina. In the early 18th century, British traders encountered a Cherokee town named Tanasi (or "Tanase", in syllabary: ᏔᎾᏏ) in present-day Monroe County, Tennessee. The town was on a river of the same name (now known as the Little Tennessee River) and appears on maps as early as 1725. It is not known whether this was the same town as the one Juan Pardo encountered, but recent research suggests that the "Tanasqui" Pardo recorded was at the confluence of the Pigeon River and the French Broad River, near modern Newport, Tennessee.

The precise meaning and origin of the word are still uncertain. Early ethnographer James Mooney asserted in 1902 that the name "can not be analyzed" and its meaning lost. But more recent research suggests that Cherokees adapted it from an earlier Yuchi word meaning "meeting place". The term bears strong resemblance to other place names at river confluences on early maps, including Tahnisee, Tanasqui, Tunnashe, and others, and to the Yuchi term Tana-tsee-dgee, literally "brother-waters-place" or more roughly, "where-the-waters-meet."

The modern spelling, Tennessee, is attributed to James Glen, the governor of South Carolina, who used this spelling in his official correspondence during the 1750s. The spelling was popularized by the publication of Henry Timberlake's Draught of the Cherokee Country in 1765. In 1788, North Carolina created "Tennessee County", the third county to be established in what is now Middle Tennessee (Tennessee County was the predecessor to present-day Montgomery and Robertson counties). When a constitutional convention met in 1796 to organize a new state out of the Southwest Territory, it adopted "Tennessee" as the name of the state.

== See also ==
- Trans-Appalachia
- Overmountain Men
- Kentucky County, Virginia
- Tennessee County, North Carolina
