= State of Westmoreland =

Proposed state in the United States

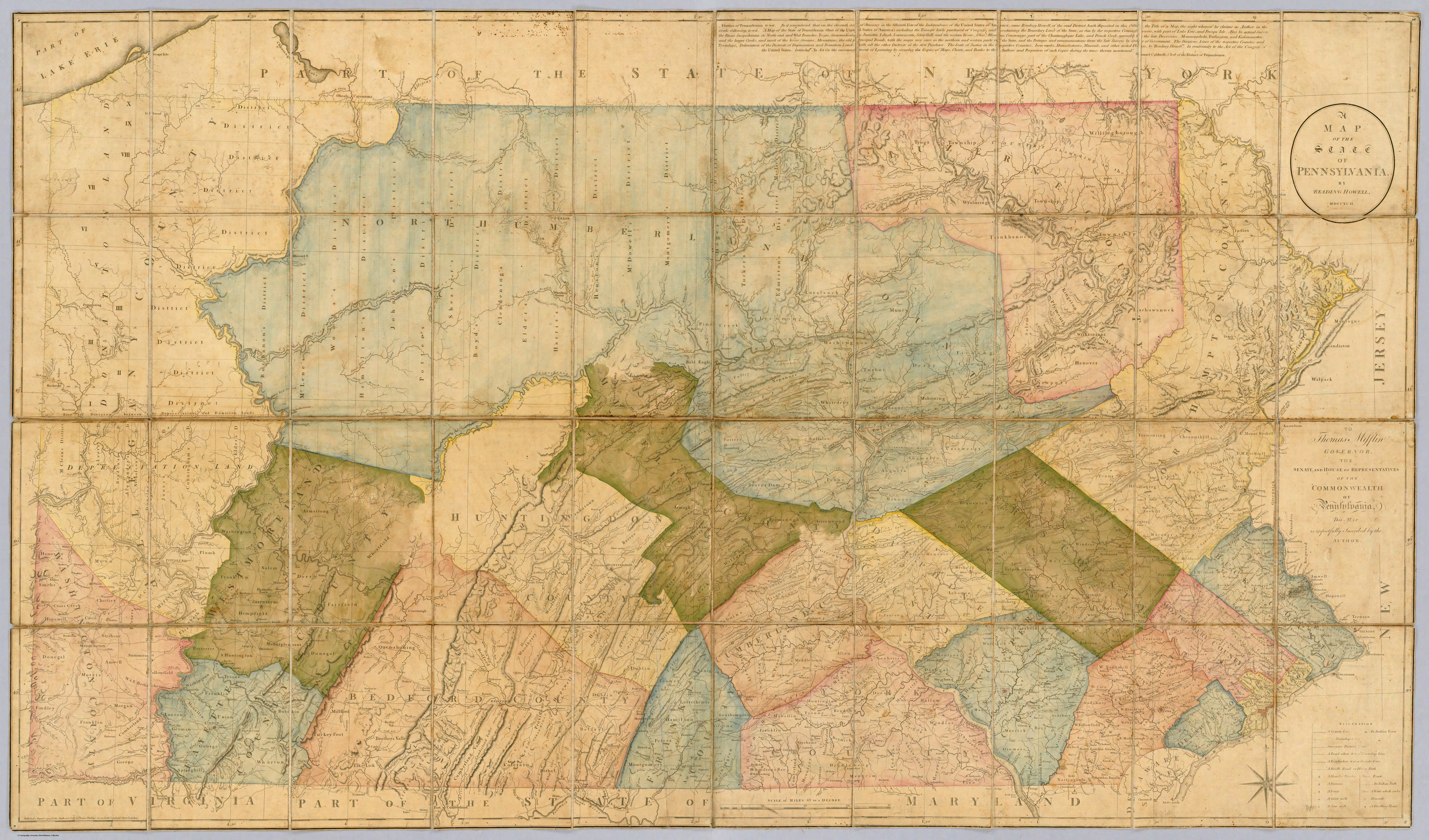
- A map of Pennsylvania in 1792 showing Luzerne County in the northeast. At the time, the future counties of Bradford, Lackawanna, Susquehanna, and Wyoming were still part of Luzerne County.
- Status: Not admitted
- Capital: Wilkes-Barre (proposed)
- Common languages: English
- Today part of: Pennsylvania

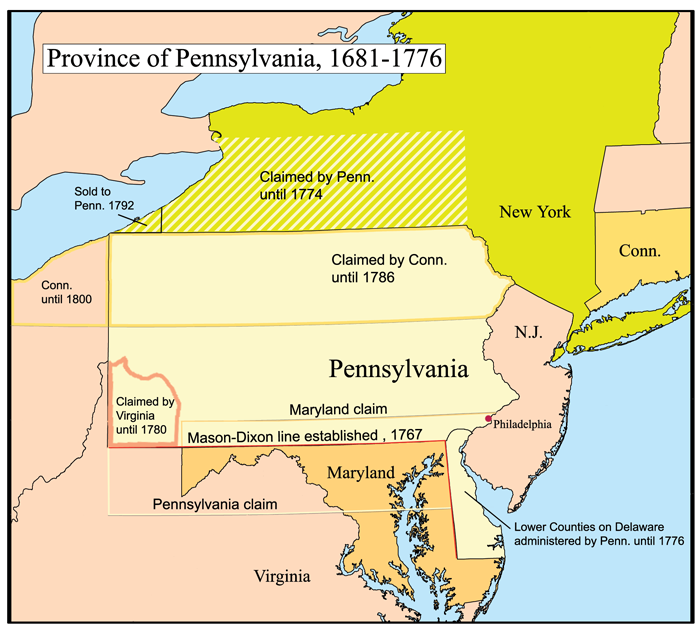
A map of Pennsylvania and the competing land claims.

The State of Westmoreland was a proposed self-proclaimed state that would have seceded from Pennsylvania in 1784, after the Congress of the Confederation had ruled that the territory belonged to Pennsylvania rather than Connecticut.

== History ==
=== Yankee-Pennamite Wars ===
Both Pennsylvania and Connecticut claimed ownership of the lands between 41° N and 42° N, and this gave rise to a series of land-conflicts collectively referred to as the Yankee-Pennamite Wars (intermittently from 1769 to 1799). By the conclusion of the American Revolutionary War, the states had made conflicting land grants in the region and independently organized it politically. Connecticut created a County of Westmoreland, with a representative seated in its assembly from the Connecticut-settled Wyoming Valley, while Pennsylvania included the settled regions in its Northumberland County. The Congress of the Confederation was asked to decide on the legal owner.

With the Decree of Trenton on December 30, 1782, the confederation government officially decided that the region belonged to Pennsylvania. Pennsylvania ruled that the Connecticut settlers ("Yankees") were not citizens of the Commonwealth, could not vote, and were to give up their property claims.

In May 1784, Pennsylvania armed men force-marched the Connecticut settlers away from the valley. In November, they returned with a greater force and captured and destroyed Fort Dickinson. With that victory, Captain John Franklin proposed that a new state separate from both Connecticut and Pennsylvania be created, to be called Westmoreland.

=== Compromise ===
To avoid further armed conflict, the Commonwealth of Pennsylvania reversed its earlier decision about the Connecticut/Yankee settlers. It agreed that Yankee property claims that predated the Decree of Trenton should be honored, with compensation in the form of fresh grants being awarded to those holding conflicting Pennsylvania claims. Most Connecticut Yankees accepted the proposed compromise, part of which involved separating a sizable part of Northumberland County to organize a new county.

On September 23, 1786, the Pennsylvania General Assembly created Luzerne County, named for the French minister the Chevalier de la Luzerne. This newly organized county encompassed a large area; Lackawanna, Wyoming, Susquehanna, and part of Bradford counties were later formed from its territory. While this compromise brought an end to the proposed state, political discord among residents associated with the land conflict continued into the 19th century.

Note that both Westmoreland County, Connecticut, and the proposed State of Westmoreland are unrelated to the current Westmoreland County (located in southwestern Pennsylvania). It was created by an Act of the Assembly and approved on February 26, 1773 by Governor of Pennsylvania Richard Penn.

Connecticut, having lost control of the Wyoming Valley, held back in compensation an equivalent 120-mile strip of territory from its release of western land claims, starting at the Pennsylvania border, and this section of NE Ohio is now known as the Western Reserve.
