= Miller Court House, Oklahoma =

Miller Court House was the first post office located in what is now Oklahoma, United States. It was located in what was then Miller County, Arkansas Territory. The post office opened September 5, 1824, and was closed December 28, 1839. Miller Court House (or Miller Courthouse) was the county seat of old Miller County. On January 20, 1825, the land was ceded by treaty to the Choctaw Nation, and non-Native Americans were forced to leave. Before leaving in November 1828, they burned the courthouse and records in protest. The exact site is unknown, but it was in what is now McCurtain County, Oklahoma.

On April 1, 1820, Governor James Miller signed an act of the Arkansas Territorial Legislature that established the "County of Miller" in the southwestern part of what was then known as Arkansas Territory. (Note: This county was, of course, named for General James Miller, then the first Territorial Governor of Arkansas.) This Miller County contained the western halves of present-day Little River, Sevier and Polk Counties in modern Arkansas, all of McCurtain, Choctaw, Pushmataha, and the southern one-third of both Latimer and Le Flore Counties in present-day Oklahoma. It also included a large area in northeast Texas. (Note: Strickland used the phrase, "...indeterminate portion...", explaining that the Arkansas Territory legislators did not really know where the western boundary of their territory crossed the Red River, since the Treaty of 1819 defined it rather vaguely. The boundary between Texas and Arkansas was not settled until the United States annexed Texas in 1845.)

The Arkansas Territory Legislative Council officially ceded the portion of Miller County north of the Red River to the Choctaw Nation in Indian Territory on October 17, 1828. Miller Court House continued to be used as a station for the registration for Choctaw Indians relocated from the East over the "trail of tears and death". Old Miller Court House was also used as a depot for the storage of corn and supplies destined for distribution to the Choctaws for many years.

On October 23, 1832, the Arkansas Territory commissioners moved the county seat to Jonesborough Plantation, (Note: This plantation no longer exists. It was near the present day city of Clarksville, in what is now Red River County, Texas) and the Miller Court House post office relocated there. Texas, however, annexed all of Miller County, Arkansas remaining south and west of the Red River and the old post office was discontinued December 28, 1838.

During the period of the Texas Republic (1836 - 1846), most residents of the disputed territory considered themselves to be citizens of Texas. Texas organized Red River County in 1837 and Fannin County, Texas in 1838. Ultimately, the former Arkansas Territory land south and west of the Red River became the present day Bowie, Cass, Delta, Franklin, Hopkins, Hunt, Lamar, Morris and Titus County, Texas Counties.

The remaining piece of Old Miller County north and east of the Red River was attached to Lafayette County, Arkansas and Texarkana became its county seat.
