= Tennessee County, North Carolina =

Historic county of North Carolina

Tennessee County in 1790, as part of the Southwest Territory

Tennessee County, North Carolina, was a subdivision of North Carolina's Washington District in the Overmountain Region, which later became the state of Tennessee. It existed from December 6, 1788, until April 8, 1796.

== History ==
Tennessee County was organized in 1788 from a portion of Davidson County, North Carolina. Its boundaries were defined as follows:

the said county of Davidson shall be divided by a line beginning on the Virginia line, running south along Sumner county to the dividing ridge between Cumberland river and Red river, then westwardly along the said ridge to the head of the main south branch of Sycamore creek, then down the said branch to the mouth thereof, then due south across Cumberland river to Davidson county line; and all that part of Davidson county that lies to the east of the said line, shall continue and remain the county of Davidson; and all that part of the said county of Davidson that lies west of the said line, shall be erected into a county by the name of Tennessee.

Both counties were transferred, along with the state's five other western counties (the former Washington District), to federal jurisdiction in 1790 and were formed into the Southwest Territory. The county was divided into Montgomery and Robertson counties in 1796, when Tennessee became the nation's 16th state. The land area formerly included in Tennessee County now forms Humphreys, Montgomery, and Robertson counties and portions of Stewart, Dickson, Cheatham, and Houston counties.

== See also ==
- List of former United States counties
- Name of Tennessee
- Trans-Appalachia
- Overmountain Men
- Kentucky County, Virginia
