= Decatur County, Alabama =

Former County in Alabama, United States

Coordinates: 34.62515°N 86.27332°W

Decatur County was a county of the state of Alabama, United States. It was named for Commodore Stephen Decatur of the United States Navy. Its county seat was Woodville.

== History ==
Decatur County was established by the Alabama Legislature on December 17, 1821. In 1822, Woodville was selected as the county seat. Several years later, however, a survey showed the county did not have the minimum constitutional area, and so Decatur County was abolished on December 28, 1825 and divided between Madison County and Jackson County. The section added to Madison County was known informally for many years as "New Madison".

== See also ==
- List of former United States counties
