= Bainbridge County, Mississippi =

Extinct subdivision (1823–1824)

Bainbridge County, Mississippi, was formed by an act of the Mississippi General Assembly dated January 17, 1823 from the western two-thirds of the original Wayne County, Mississippi. Its area was almost identical to the modern limits of Covington County, the center third of the original county being cut off to form Jones County, Mississippi in 1826, leaving the area of former Bainbridge County as Covington County. The land had been settled from 1811 on by families from the southeastern United States, including a number of free people of color. A state census, "An account of the increase and decrease of the population of the State of Mississippi in the County of Bainbridge for the year 1823," was taken in its first year of existence, but the county was dissolved by an act dated January 21, 1824 and its land returned to Covington County. No reason for its dissolution has been discovered. Though the reason the county was named Bainbridge was not recorded in the creating act, in keeping with naming traditions of that time and place, it was likely named to honor notable U.S. Navy Commodore William Bainbridge.

== See also ==
- List of former United States counties
