= Pearl County, Mississippi =

Extinct subdivision (1872–1878)

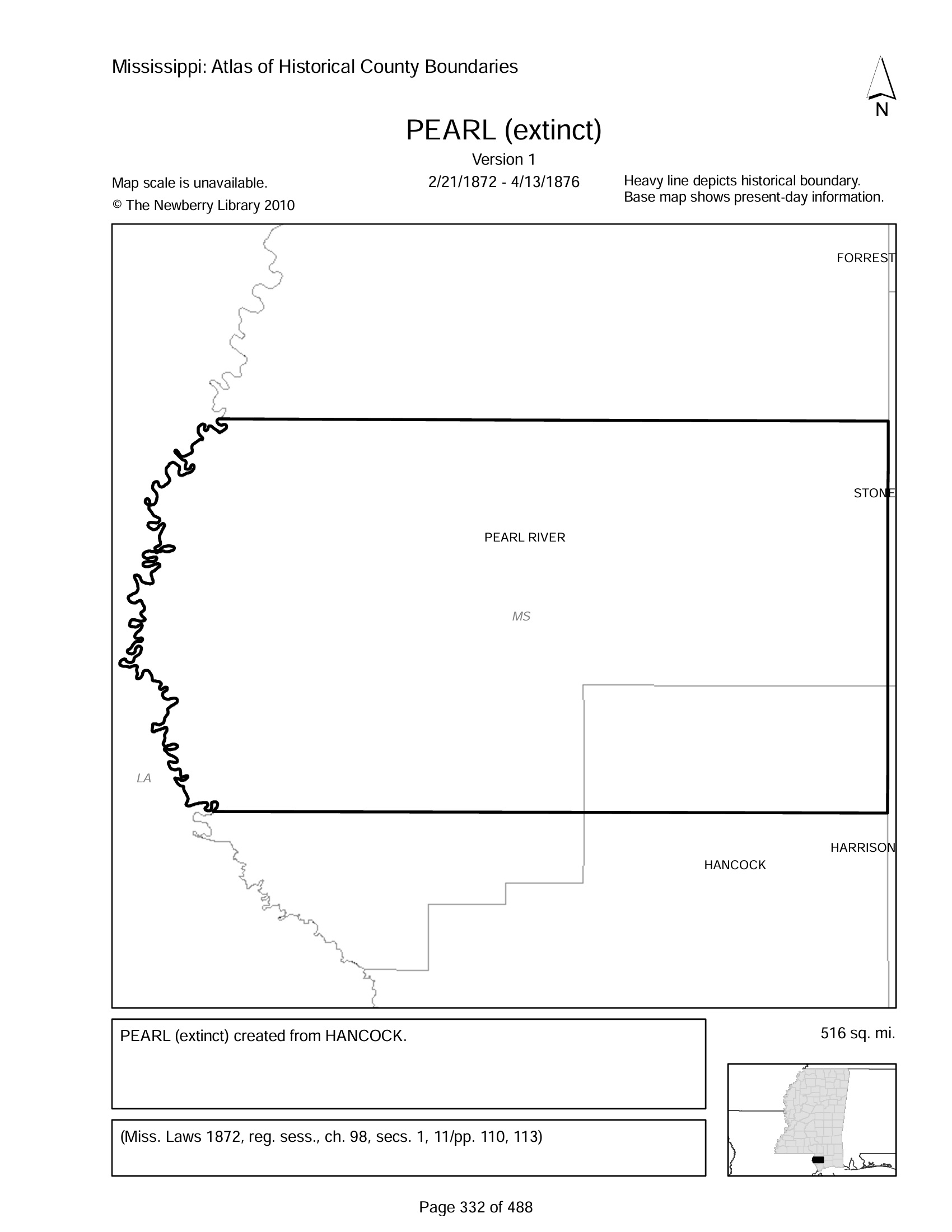
Pearl County Mississippi (extinct), 1872 to 1876 boundaries

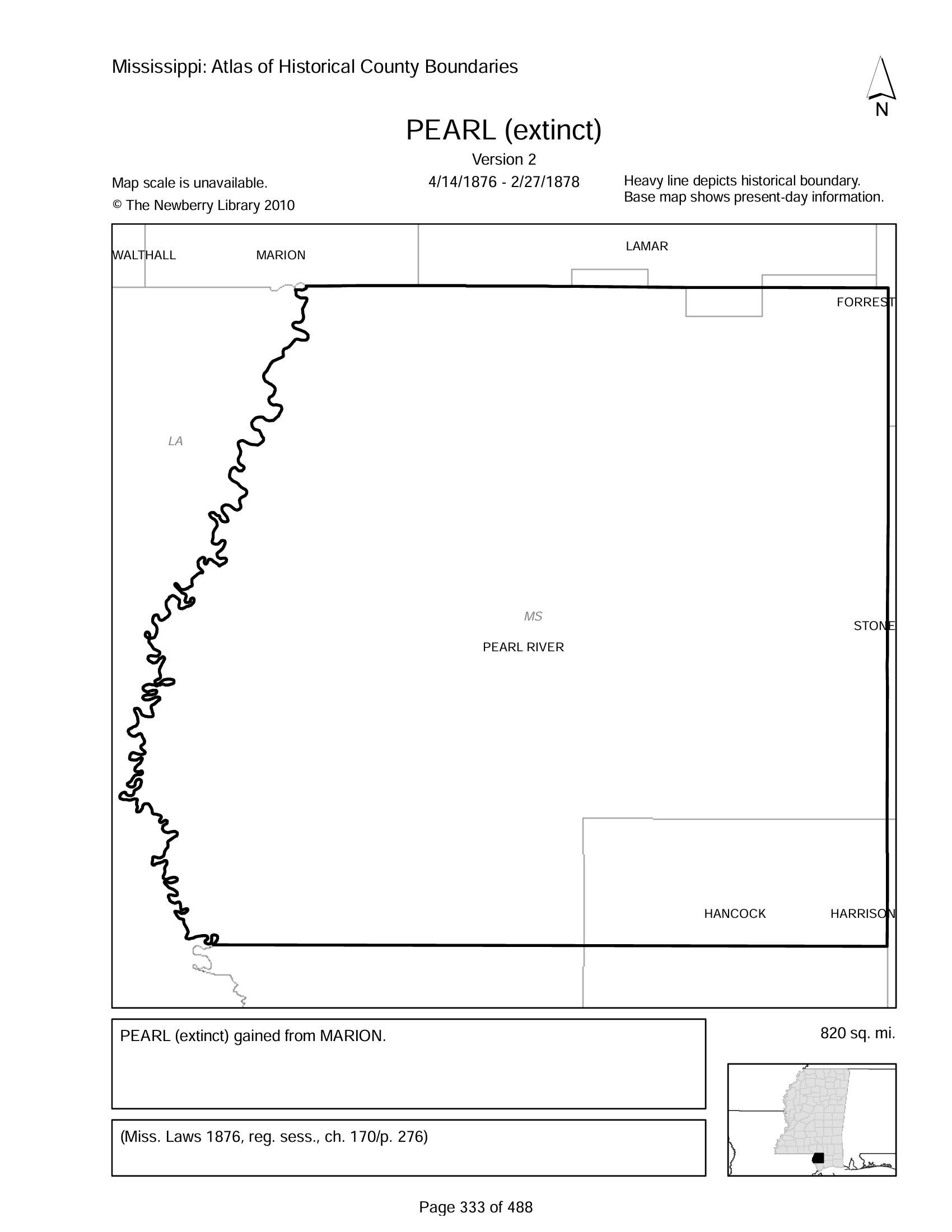
Pearl County Mississippi (extinct), 1876 to 1878 boundaries

Pearl County, Mississippi is an extinct county of the United States, located in the watershed of the Pearl River. It was organized in 1872 and extinguished in 1878. The county was created from Hancock county and then expanded in 1876 when the legislature attached "all that portion of Marion county lying and being south of the 31st degree of latitude, and making the 31st parallel line the boundary between the two counties." As of 1878, it was thought that the county had a maximum of 200 voters and a total population of fewer than 1,200 people. After it was disestablished, the land reverted to Hancock and Marion counties.

According to a 20th-century history, "The area that made up Pearl County was very thinly settled. There were such a few people to pay taxes for the operation of the county government that they were always in financial difficulty...The courthouse burned and there was no record left of their debts...The people then went back to paying their taxes at Columbia and Bay St. Louis as they had done before Pearl County had been formed." In 1890 another county was formed in the same general vicinity, Pearl River County, but the name was slightly changed with the idea that "this made it legally possible for the new county to avoid liability of the old debts of Pearl County."

== See also ==
- List of former United States counties
