= Beckham County, Kentucky =

Former county in Kentucky, United States in 1904

Coordinates: 38°18′00″N 83°10′30″W

Beckham County, Kentucky was a county formed by the Kentucky General Assembly on February 9, 1904. Beckham County was created in the northeastern part of the state from parts of Carter, Elliott, and Lewis counties. The county seat was Olive Hill. Beckham County was dissolved by the Kentucky Court of Appeals on April 29, 1904.

== History ==
The legislature first proposed to name the county Hardscrabble County. The proposal then became to name it Goebel County in honor of the late assassinated governor William Goebel. Beckham County was ultimately named for then-governor J. C. W. Beckham.

A man named C. V. Zimmerman filed a lawsuit against Beckham County—specifically against its county judge, Captain C. C. Brooks—when Beckham County tried to collect a $75.00 debt from Zimmerman. Zimmerman claimed that under an 1891 Kentucky Constitutional amendment, creation of Beckham County was unlawful because it left other counties with less than 400 square miles (1,000 km^{2}) of land, and that Beckham County itself also had less than 400 square miles (1,000 km^{2}) of land. Carter County joined Zimmerman's suit and added the claim that the creation of Beckham County ran its borders too close to the county seats of Carter and Lewis counties, violating the 10-mile (16 km) minimum. Carter County also claimed that the illegal creation of Beckham County would unfairly deprive Carter County of tax revenues that rightfully belonged to Carter County. Beckham County was dissolved by the Kentucky Court of Appeals on April 29, 1904, because it was not created in conformance with state law.

Marriage and postal records from the brief existence of Beckham County, Kentucky still exist. The county records are kept in the Carter County courthouse.

Beckham County, Oklahoma which still exists today, is also named for J. C. W. Beckham, who was still governor at the time of its creation in 1907.

== See also ==
- Bullfrog County, Nevada, a similarly short-lived county
