= Miller County, Arkansas Territory =

Coordinates: 35.6317°N 93.4018°W

Miller County
- County of Arkansas
- 1820–1838
- Capital: Gilliland Settlement (1820-1821); Miller Court House (1821-1832); Jonesborough (1832-1838)
- Population
  - 1820: 999
- History
  - Established: April 1 1820
  - Disestablished: 1838
- Contained within
  - Country: United States
  - Territory: Arkansas Territory (1820-1836)
  - State: Arkansas (1836-1838)
Preceded by	Succeeded by
Hempstead County	Sevier County; Fannin County
- Today part of: United States

Miller County was a county that existed from April 1, 1820 to 1838, first as part of Arkansas Territory and later the State of Arkansas. It included much of what is southeastern Oklahoma and the northeastern counties in Texas (Bowie, Red River, Lamar, Fannin, Cass, Morris, Titus, Franklin, Hopkins, Delta and Hunt). It was named for James Miller, the first governor of the Arkansas Territory.

== Formation of original county ==
According to historian Rex W. Strickland, there were three different political entities that had borne the name "Miller County, Arkansas". All have been in the southwestern corner of the state of Arkansas, but covered different areas at different times. The first was created in 1820, before Arkansas became a state. The second existed after Arkansas was required to cede the land that was inside the boundary of Indian Territory. The third was created after Arkansas was required to relinquish its claim to land that was to become part of the Republic of Texas.

Effective April 1, 1820, Miller County was established by the Arkansas Territorial Assembly through a partitioning of Hempstead County. The Act, signed by Territorial Governor James Miller, delineated its borders as follows:

Be it enacted by the General Assembly of the Territory of Arkansas, That all that portion of the County of Hempstead and bounded as follows, to-wit: Beginning on the north bank of the great Red River, at a point due south of the Cossetat Bayou, a branch of Little River, thence due north to the mouth of the Cossetat Bayou aforesaid, then up said bayou to the head of its main branch, then north to the boundary line of Clark, then due west with said line to the Canadian river, or the Indian boundary line, then with the said line to the great Red river aforesaid, then southeasterly with the Indian or Spanish boundary line to a point due south of the point of beginning, then due north to the beginning, to be laid off and erected into a separate county, to be called and known by the name of the county of Miller.

In modern terms, old Miller County included parts of three states: Arkansas (Little River, Sevier and Polk counties), Oklahoma (LeFlore and Latimer counties, Choctaw, McCurtain and Pushmataha counties) and Texas.

The 1820 territorial census listed 999 residents in Miller County, 82 of them slaves. Initially, the county seat was the Gilliland Settlement. (Note: The home of John Hall was where all courts of record would be held until a permanent seat of justice could be selected.) In August 1821, the county commissioners selected Miller Court House as the county seat. The Miller Court House community was established at a community previously called Shawneetown, 7 miles (11 km) west of the present town of Idabel, Oklahoma. (Note: Some sources have said that the exact location is now unknown, except that it was in what is currently McCurtain County, Oklahoma.) The post office was established September 7, 1824.

== Removal of area promised to Choctaws ==
Although settlers continued to move into the area, the Treaty of Doak's Stand (October 18, 1820) was about to change Miller County. After Doak's Stand, Choctaws had already been moving into the area of Arkansas Territory, but a treaty signed January 20, 1825, ceded the land west of a line "one hundred paces east of Fort Smith, and running thence, due south, to Red river" to them in exchange for their land in the East. The residents of Miller County signed petitions, the territorial government pressured Washington, but all to no avail. Finally, on October 17, 1828, the territorial legislature abolished Miller County north of the Red River and added the remnant of that county east of the new boundary line to Sevier County. The residents who remained in the county burned Miller Court House and all the county records on November 5, 1828.

== Removal of areas claimed by Texas ==
The commissioners moved the county seat to Jonesborough plantation south of the Red River on October 23, 1832, and the Miller Court House post office relocated there. However, Miller County south of the Red River was in dispute with the Mexican government. After Texas seceded, they attempted to enforce their claims to the area. In 1838, Texas formed Fannin County, and Washington finally discontinued the Miller Court House post office on December 28, 1838. When Texas joined the Union in 1845 the borders became permanent.

== See also ==
- Treaty of Doak's Stand (1820)
- Treaty of Dancing Rabbit Creek (1820)
- Treaty of Washington City (1825)

== Sources ==
- Conner, Seymour V. "Miller County, Arkansas" Handbook of Texas-Online, s.v. (accessed August 6, 2006).
- Kappler, Charles (Editor). Treaty with the Choctaws, 1820 (Doak's Stand). Indian Affairs: Laws and Treaties. Washington: Government Printing Office, 1904.
- Kappler, Charles (Editor). Treaty with the Choctaws, 1825. Indian Affairs: Laws and Treaties. Washington: Government Printing Office, 1904.
- Kent, Caroline."Choctaw Boundary Line." Encyclopedia of Arkansas History & Culture.2013.
- Kappler, Charles (Editor). http://digital.library.okstate.edu/Kappler/vol2/trea
- Strickland, Rex W. "Miller County, Arkansas Territory, The Frontier That Men Forgot", Chronicles of Oklahoma 18:1 (March 1940) 12-34 (accessed August 16, 2006).
- Strickland, Rex W. "Establishment of 'Old' Miller County, Arkansas Territory-Chapter II", Chronicles of Oklahoma 18:2 (June 1940) 154-170 (accessed August 16, 2006).
- Strickland, Rex W. "Miller County, Arkansas Territory: The Frontier That Men Forgot-Chapter III", Chronicles of Oklahoma 19:1 (March 1941) 37-54 (accessed August 16, 2006) (NOTE: Map included)
