= Peketon County, Kansas Territory =

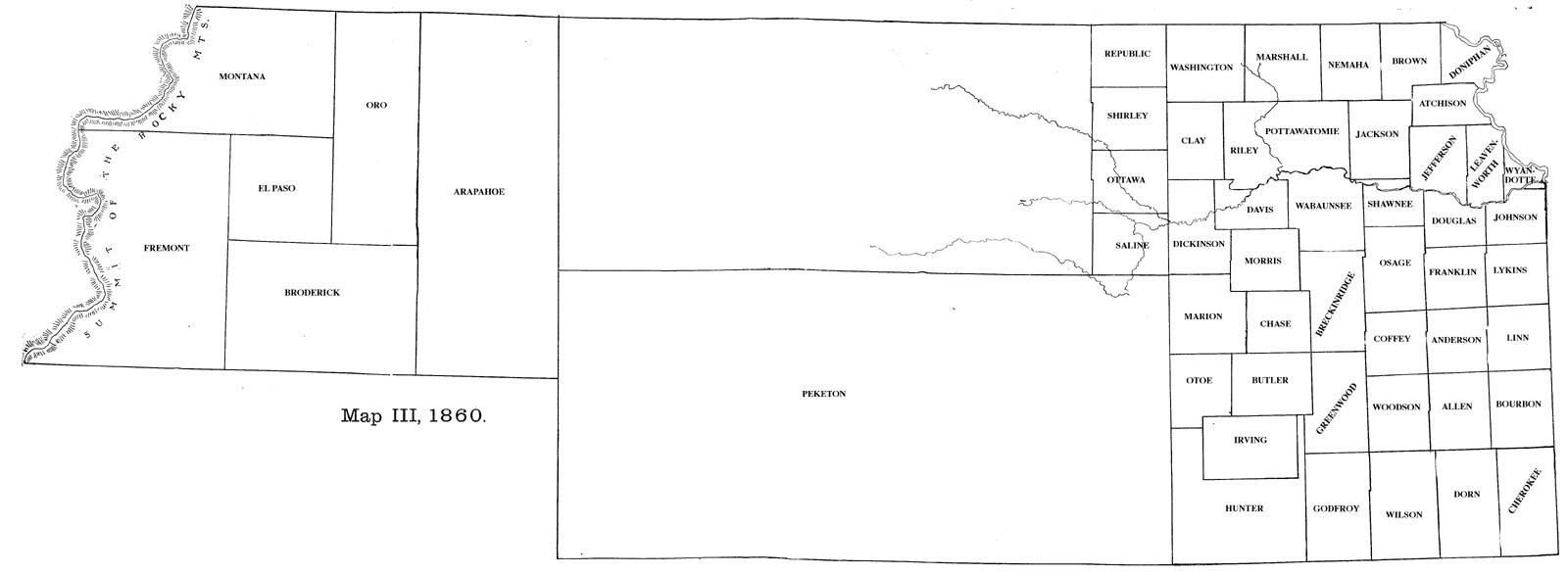
A map of Kansas Territory in 1860. Peketon County is located in the bottom-middle of the map.

Peketon County was a county of the United States Territory of Kansas that existed from 1860 and 1865. The county seat was the now-extinct settlement of Beach Valley, located near present-day Lyons, Kansas.

== History ==
Peketon County was established in 1860, by the passage of a bill by S. N. Wood, entitled "An act to establish Peketon County", which proclaimed "all that territory west of the sixth principal meridian and south of Township 16, in Kansas Territory, [be] erected into a county, to be known by the name of Peketon County. The land designated as Peketon County included all land south of Saline County, west of Marion County, north of the border with Indian Territory, and west of the border with New Mexico Territory.

Following the Republican Party election victories in 1860, the United States Congress admitted Kansas to the Union. The Kansas Act of Admission excluded the portion of the Kansas Territory west of the 25th meridian west from Washington from the new state; for this reason, the western most portions of Peketon County were ceded to the newly-organized Colorado Territory.

On February 17, 1865, Peketon County was subsumed by Marion County. Following a bill passed in 1867, the area that had once comprised Peketon County was subsequently divided into a number of smaller counties, including Barber, Barton, Comanche, Ford, Harper, Hodgeman, McPherson, Ness, Pawnee, Pratt, Reno, Rice, Rush, Sedgwick and Stafford.

== See also ==
- Historic Colorado counties
- History of Colorado
- History of Kansas
- Pike's Peak Gold Rush
- Territory of Colorado
- Territory of Jefferson
- Territory of Kansas
