= Desert County, Utah Territory =

Legacy county in Utah

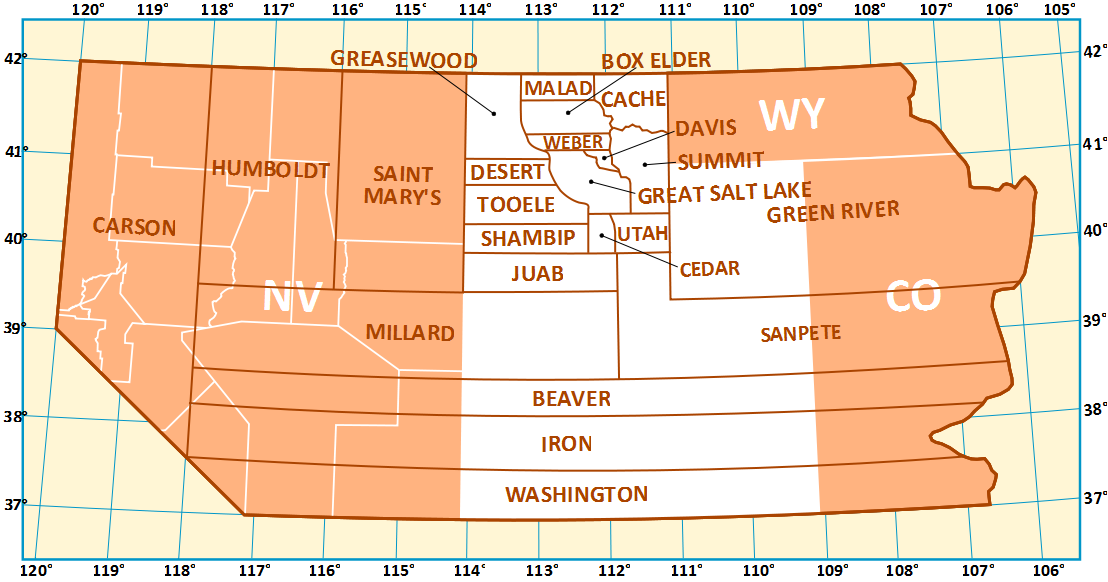
Utah Territory 1856 map

Desert County is a former county in the U.S. state of Utah. It was established by the Territory of Utah on March 3, 1852 and was dissolved on January 17, 1862. Its modern day location is taken up by Box Elder County, Tooele County, and Nevada.

The Utah Territory Legislative Assembly determined its boundary as bounded North by Weber County, east by the western shore of Salt Lake, south by the parallel of latitude, forming the southern boundary of Davis county, and west by California.
