= Warren Parish, Louisiana =

Defunct Parish of Louisiana, United States of America

Coordinates: 32.553°N 91.263°W

Warren Parish is a former parish of Louisiana, formed in 1811 from parts of Concordia Parish. The parish was located in parts of present-day Madison and East Carroll Parishes. All of present-day Madison Parish lying north of the point opposite Vicksburg, Mississippi, and all of present-day East Carroll Parish was part of the new parish named Warren Parish, which was formed in 1811. The State legislature erased Warren Parish in 1814, with the northern part of present-day Madison Parish going to Ouachita Parish and the southern part going to Concordia again.
