= Malad County, Utah Territory =

County of Utah Territory, USA

Coordinates: 41.9°N 113.0°W

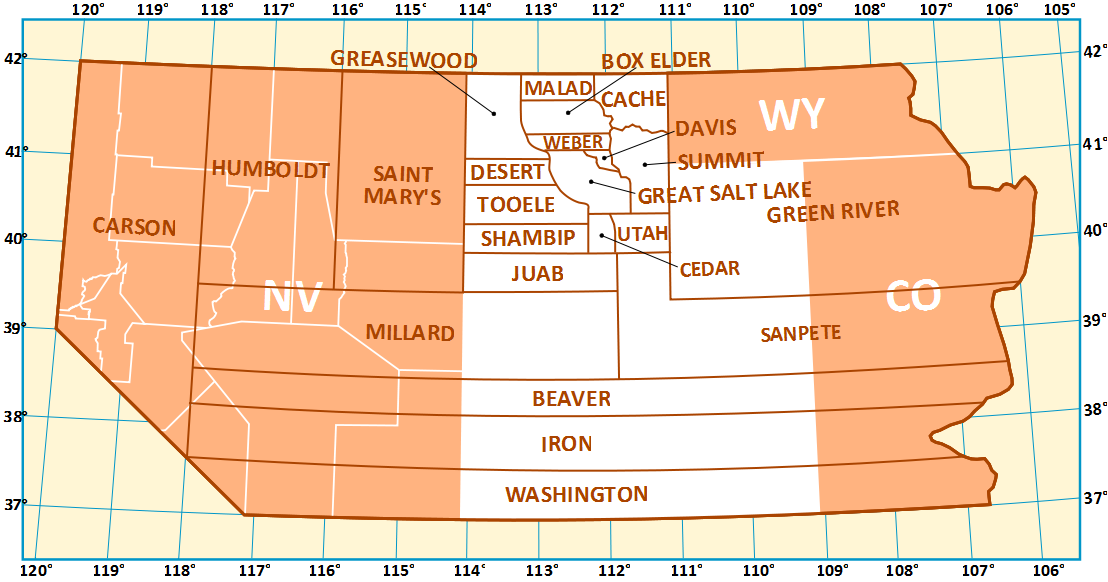
Map of 1856 Utah Territory counties in orange. Present-day Utah has a white background.

Malad County, Utah Territory was created 12 January 1856 from part of Weber County. The Utah legislature discontinued Malad County on January 17, 1862, and its land was given to Box Elder County. Malad County is now extinct.

For records of Malad County, Utah Territory see:

- Utah State Archives may have a few records from the Utah Territory Malad County courts and deeds.
- Utah 1856 Territorial Census

Some records for old Malad County, Utah Territory may have been transferred to, or may have been re-recorded in Box Elder County, Utah.
