= Biloxi Parish, Orleans Territory =

Biloxi Parish (also spelled Beloxy Parish) was a civil parish (county) of the Territory of Orleans, formed in January 1811 from Spanish West Florida, stretching from the Pearl River to "the river falling into the bay of Beloxi [sic]" (the Tchoutacabouffa). The parish was eliminated in 1812 when Louisiana became a U.S. state, and all the Gulf of Mexico coastal lands from the Pearl to the Perdido rivers were transferred to the Mississippi Territory.

== Popular culture ==
"Biloxi Parish" is referenced in the song of the same title by the band The Gaslight Anthem.
