= Westmoreland County, Connecticut =

Westmoreland County, Connecticut was a county established by the State of Connecticut in October 1776, encompassing the present-day area of Wyoming Valley, in northeastern Pennsylvania. Both colonies claimed this territory and the issue was further confused by the Haudenosaunee (Iroquois) selling the territory to both Connecticut in 1754 and again to Pennsylvania in 1768. The first and second of the Pennamite–Yankee Wars were fought in what became the county in 1769–1771 and 1775.

In December 1782 a court of arbitration appointed by the Continental Congress met in Trenton, New Jersey, and made a unanimous decision in favor of Pennsylvania's claim. In compensation, Connecticut received equivalent territory of 3,300,000 acres named the Western Reserve, in the future northeast of Ohio. Pennsylvania refused to confirm title to land owned by settlers from Connecticut, which caused the Third Pennamite Yankee War. Westmoreland County was renamed to Luzerne County in 1786 but the issue of land title was not fully resolved for many years.

Some settlers in Westmoreland County briefly considered breaking away from Pennsylvania and forming a separate state but the plan was never implemented.

Westmoreland County ceased to exist in 1782 as a result of the Trenton Decree. It has no relationship to the current Westmoreland County, Pennsylvania, which is located on the western and opposite side of the state.

== See also ==
- Pennamite–Yankee War
