= Pascagoula Parish, Orleans Territory =

Former parish of the Territory of Orleans (1811–1812)

Pascagoula Parish was a civil parish (county) of the Territory of Orleans, formed in January 1811 from the formerly Spanish West Florida colony, stretching initially from Biloxi to Bayou La Batre, but a few weeks later extended eastward to the Perdido River. The parish was eliminated in 1812 when Louisiana became a U.S. state, and all the Gulf of Mexico coastal lands from the Pearl to the Perdido rivers were transferred to the Mississippi Territory.
