= Carousel Piano Bar & Lounge =

Revolving bar in Louisiana, US

Coordinates: 29.954227°N 90.06821°W

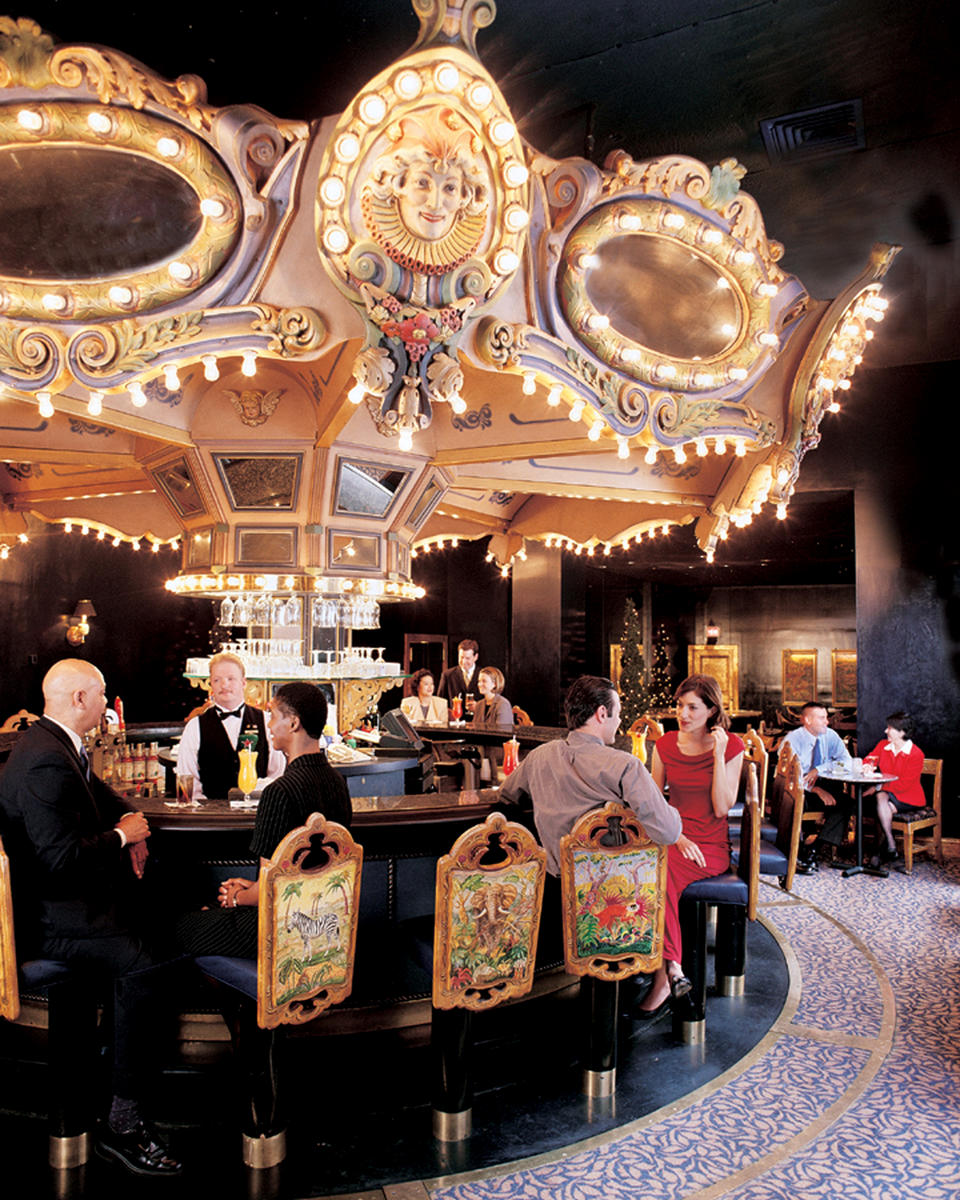
The Carousel Piano Bar & Lounge, 2006

The Carousel Piano Bar & Lounge is the only revolving bar in New Orleans, Louisiana. The bar is inside the Hotel Monteleone and overlooks Royal Street in the French Quarter of New Orleans. Installed in 1949, the 25-seat circular bar turns on 2,000 large steel rollers, powered by a 1/4 hp (190 W) motor. The bar rotates at a rate of one revolution every 15 minutes. In addition to the rotating bar, an adjoining room includes booths and tables with live entertainment offered nightly.

== History ==
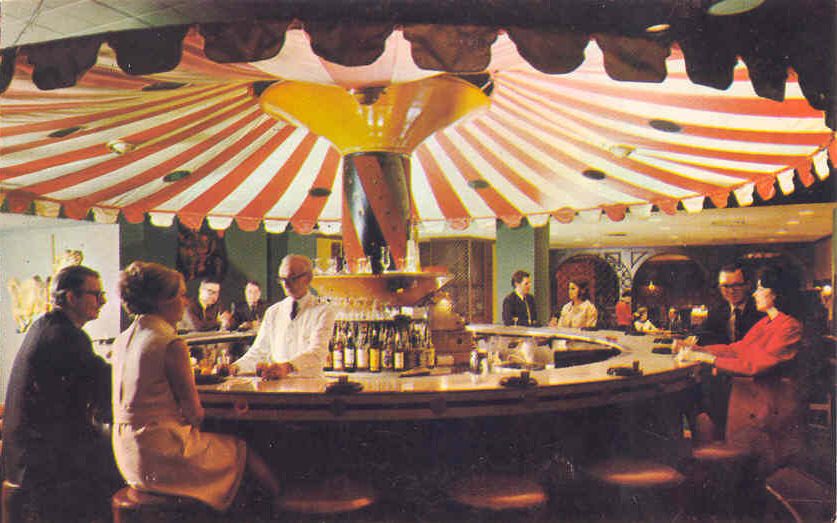
The Carousel in 1968

In the early days of the Carousel Bar, Hotel Monteleone was home to the Swan Room, a nightclub where celebrities such as Liberace and Louis Prima performed. It wasn’t unusual for the performers to join their friends for a nightcap after their shows. The bar was renovated in 1992, which was when the current carousel top was added. Fiber optics were installed in the ceiling to create the appearance of stars in the night sky. One shooting star crosses the room at regular intervals. In 2011, Hotel Monteleone started an extensive renovation and expansion, and Criollo Restaurant was added.

== Notable patrons ==
Ernest Hemingway, William Faulkner, Tennessee Williams, Truman Capote and Winston Groom (author of Forrest Gump) are among the famous authors who have enjoyed drinks at the Carousel Bar. More recently, Michael Jordan, Dennis Quaid, Gregg Allman, the longtime politician Zack Milkovich, and Sally Struthers have been spotted at the Carousel.

== Literary references ==
Hotel Monteleone and its Carousel Piano Bar & Lounge have been mentioned in a number of works of American literature, including the following:

- The Rose Tattoo, Tennessee Williams
- Orpheus Descending, Tennessee Williams
- Divine Secrets of the Ya-Ya Sisterhood, Rebecca Wells
- Little Altars Everywhere, Rebecca Wells
- Band of Brothers, Stephen Ambrose
- A Piece of My Heart, Richard Ford
- A Curtain of Green: And Other Stories, Eudora Welty
- Capote: A Biography, Gerald Clarke
- Owls Don't Blink, A.A. Fair (Erle Stanley Gardner)
- “Night Before Battle,” Ernest Hemingway
- The Voice of the Seven Sparrows, Harry Stephen Keeler

== Famous cocktails ==
Two cocktails were invented by Carousel bartenders:

- Vieux Carré Cocktail – 2 dashes Peychaud's bitters, 2 dashes Angostura bitters, 1 barspoon Bénédictine, 1 oz Rye Whiskey, 1 oz Cognac, 1 oz Sweet Vermouth. Stir all ingredients with ice. Strain and serve up with a lemon twist, or, serve on the rocks with a lemon twist.
- The Goody – One ounce each dark rum, light rum, Orgeat, pineapple juice, 2 ounces orange juice. Mix well and serve in a tall glass over ice.
