= Bonnie Bruckheimer =

American film producer

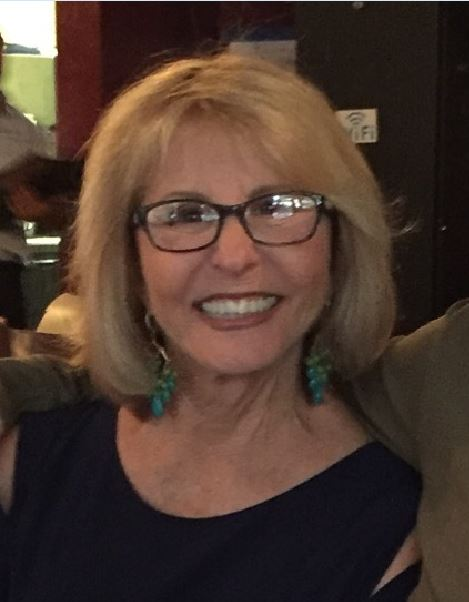
- Born: Bonnie Sue Fishman; July 26, 1944 (age 82); New York, U.S.
- Other names: Bonnie Fishman, Bonnie Martell, Bonnie Bruckheimer-Martell
- Education: Far Rockaway High School
- Occupations: Film and television producer, professor, philanthropist
- Years active: 1985–present
- Notable work: Hocus Pocus (1993), Beaches (1988), Divine Secrets of the Ya-Ya Sisterhood (2002)
- Spouse: Jerry Bruckheimer (m. 1969; div. 1974) Eric Martell (m. 1984; div. 1990)
- Children: 2

Bonnie Sue Fishman (born July 26, 1944), known professionally as Bonnie Bruckheimer, is an American film and television producer. She has been known professionally as Bonnie Fishman, Bonnie Martell, and Bonnie Bruckheimer-Martell. She has been nominated for 2 Emmy Awards. In 1985, she and Bette Midler formed a production company, All Girl Productions, and were producing partners until 2002.

Her films include Hocus Pocus, Beaches and Divine Secrets of the Ya-Ya Sisterhood. Her films have been produced by Disney and Universal, while her TV specials and sitcom were produced by HBO and CBS Television Studios.

== Early life ==
Bruckheimer was born in New York, the daughter of Hyman and Roslyn Fishman, both of Jewish descent. She is the second oldest of four children: Blossom, Bonnie, Bettiann and Robert. She attended Far Rockaway High School in Far Rockaway, NY and graduated from the class of 1962.

== Early career ==
While in New York, she was married to Jerry Bruckheimer who went on to become producer of many films and other projects. Their marriage lasted from 1969 to 1974.

She worked as a producer's assistant on Night Moves (1975) and Blue Collar (1978) and then went on to be Aaron Russo's assistant on The Rose in 1979. This was when she met Bette Midler and then went on to be Midler's personal and professional assistant.

She continued to assist Bette Midler during Jinxed! (1982), the film that nearly destroyed Midler's career. Bruckheimer also worked with Midler in other aspects of her career, like her already-successful music career—including concert tours like Bette Midler No Frills (1983) which was televised on Cinemax. Bruckheimer worked as an associate producer on that production. They collaborated as producing partners and formed All Girl Productions. Bruckheimer was president of the production company from 1985 till 2002.

== Film and television productions ==
In 1985, Bonnie Bruckheimer and Bette Midler, along with Margaret Jennings South, formed All Girl Productions at the suggestion of Disney’s top executives Michael Eisner and Jeffrey Katzenberg. Bruckheimer and Midler named their production company All Girl Productions as an ironic play on the politically incorrect term for women. Bruckheimer had come up with their business motto: "We hold a grudge." After producing Beaches, South left the company in 1990.

Following the success of Beaches, Bruckheimer co-produced Stella (1990), co-starring John Goodman, and produced For the Boys, a film that earned Midler a Golden Globe Award and her second Academy Award nomination.

In 1993, Bruckheimer co-produced the family-friendly Halloween-themed film Hocus Pocus which continues to air annually on Disney Channel after earning itself a cult following. That same year, she was the executive producer on the made-for-television movie Gypsy, an adaptation of the 1959 stage musical of the same name about the iconic Gypsy Rose Lee. Bruckheimer earned an Emmy nomination for Gypsy. The movie was also nominated for several Golden Globe Awards that year.

Bruckheimer later produced Man of the House (1995), starring Jonathan Taylor Thomas, Chevy Chase, and Farrah Fawcett. This was the final production that Bruckheimer had with Disney studios. She and Midler consequently took their production company to Universal Studios where Bruckheimer produced That Old Feeling (1997), a starring vehicle for Midler along with Dennis Farina.

While Midler continued with her music career, Bruckheimer was executive producer on the televised special Bette Midler in Concert: Diva Las Vegas (1997) for HBO, which earned Midler an Emmy Award for Individual Performance in a Variety or Music Program.

After leaving Universal Studios, Bruckheimer and Midler took All Girl Productions to Sony Tri-Star that included a television deal. It was from this new deal that led to Midler's first-ever sitcom, aptly titled Bette (2000-2001) which earned her another Golden Globe nomination. Both Bruckheimer and Midler were executive producers on the show created by Jeffrey Lane. Lindsay Lohan played Midler's daughter in the pilot but was replaced with Marina Malota for the rest of the series. The series focused on Midler and the hijinks she experienced with people based on her family and business associates. The character that was based on Bruckheimer was named "Connie" (which rhymed with Bonnie), played by Joanna Gleason. 18 total episodes were produced but only 16 episodes aired before CBS canceled the show. It was after the show had been canceled that Bruckheimer and Midler decided to end their partnership and closed the doors on their production company All Girl Productions.

Bruckheimer also produced the film adaptation of Rebecca Wells' Divine Secrets of the Ya-Ya Sisterhood (2002), starring Sandra Bullock, Ashley Judd and Ellen Burstyn. Bruckheimer's last production was a critical hit, which was directed by Callie Khouri.

In 2018, she was given the inaugural Vision Award by the Set Decorators Society of America International for her film and television work.

== Personal life ==
Bruckheimer taught a course on women in the entertainment industry at USC's School of Cinematic Arts in 2011 where she has served as an adjunct professor ever since. Bruckheimer brings in women who work in the industry to share their experiences about working in different fields.

"Many lessons from Jeffrey [Katzenberg] keep coming to mind as I teach my USC class. However, the one that stands out, when I first started producing, was 'Everyone passes on everything,'" she said. "He taught me that if you believe in a project, don’t second guess yourself just because a writer or director turns it down." What Bruckheimer has found to have more meaning outside of Hollywood, however, is serving as a volunteer grief counselor at Our House (2008–present). "Helping teens cope with the death of a parent is the most gratifying work I’ve ever done," she said. Bruckheimer continues to speak at various events and benefits to encourage the empowerment of women in the film industry. She has also been outspoken in Hollywood about ageism in the industry.

Since the 1990s, Bruckheimer has lived in a 1936 Spanish-style house in Valley Village, CA once owned by Fleetwood Mac's John McVie. She sells houses.

== Stage and film work ==
=== Film ===
- Where We Disappear (Executive Producer, 2019)
- Divine Secrets of the Ya-Ya Sisterhood (Producer, 2002)
- That Old Feeling (Producer, 1997)
- Man of the House (Producer, 1995)
- Hocus Pocus (Co-Producer, 1993)
- For the Boys (Producer, 1991)
- Stella (Co-Producer, 1990)
- Beaches (Co-Producer, 1988)
- Big Business (Co-Producer, 1988)

=== Television ===
- Bette (TV Series; Executive Producer, 2000-2001)
- Bette Midler in Concert: Diva Las Vegas (Concert Film; Executive Producer, 1997)
- Gypsy (Executive Producer, 1993)
- Bette Midler No Frills (Associate Producer, 1983)

=== Broadway ===
- Bette! Divine Madness (Production Associate,1979-1980)

=== Cameos and special appearances ===
- Painting Anna (2015)
- What Was I Thinking (www.youtube.com/watch?v=yTaUbF4vPto, 2008)
- Revealed with Jules Asner (Ashley Judd, 2002)
- HBO First Look ("Unlocking Divine Secrets of the Ya-Ya-Sisterhood," 2002)
- Scene Smoking: Cigarettes, Cinema & the Myth of Cool (2001)
- Seinfeld (The Understudy, 1995)
- Beaches (1988)

== Publication ==
- "Handsome," What Was I Thinking?: 58 Bad Boyfriend Stories (edited by Barbara Davilman & Liz Dubelman, St. Martin's Press, 1999).

== Professional honors and awards ==
- Bette Midler in Concert: Diva Las Vegas (Primetime Emmy Nomination 1997: Outstanding Variety, Music or Comedy Special)
- Gypsy (Primetime Emmy Nomination 1994: Outstanding Made-for-Television Movie)
- Set Decorators Society of America International (2018 Vision Award)

== Philanthropy ==
- Our House (Grief Counselor, 2009–present)
- Athena Film Festival - Advisory Committee
- Women's Media Center – Honorary Advisory Council
- National Women's History Museum - National Advisory Council
- Saks Fifth Ave./Cedars-Sinai Research for Women's Cancers – National Ambassador, 2010; National Spokeswoman (1999-2003)
