= List of parishes in Louisiana =

Parishes of Louisiana
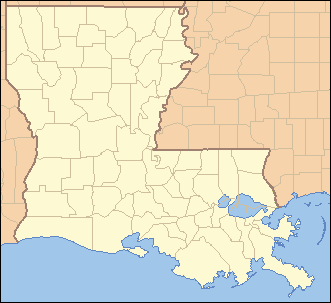
- Category: Second-level administrative division
- Location: State of Louisiana
- Number: 64 parishes
- Populations: Greatest: 456,180 (East Baton Rouge Parish); Least: 3,700 (Tensas Parish); Average: 72,159
- Areas: Largest: 2,429 square miles (6,290 km^{2}) (Plaquemines Parish); Smallest: 203 square miles (530 km^{2}) (West Baton Rouge Parish); Average: 781 square miles (2,020 km^{2})
- Government: Parish government
- Subdivisions: Cities, towns, census-designated places and unincorporated areas

The U.S. state of Louisiana is divided into 64 parishes (French: paroisses), making it the one of only three states to not call its primary subdivisions "counties", the others being Alaska and Connecticut. (Note: Alaska is divided into boroughs and census areas and Connecticut is divided into planning regions.) Louisiana's usage of the term "parish" for a geographic region or local government dates back to the French colonial era and is connected to ecclesiastical parishes.

Thirty-eight parishes are governed by a council called a police jury. The remaining 26 have various other forms of government, including council-president, council-manager, parish commission, and consolidated parish/city.

== History ==
Louisiana was formed from French and Spanish colonies, which were both officially Roman Catholic. Local colonial government was based upon parishes, as the local ecclesiastical division.

Following the Louisiana Purchase from France, the territorial legislative council in April 1805 divided the Territory of Orleans (the predecessor of Louisiana state) into 12 counties. The borders of these counties were poorly defined, but largely coincided with the colonial ecclesiastical parishes.

On March 31, 1807, the territorial legislature created 19 parishes without abolishing any of the old counties (which term continued to exist until 1845). In 1811, a constitutional convention was held to prepare for Louisiana's admission into the Union. This organized the state into seven judicial districts, each consisting of groups of parishes. In 1816, the first official map of the state used the term parish, as did the 1845 constitution. Since then, the official term for Louisiana's primary civil divisions has been parishes.

The 19 original parishes were joined by Catahoula Parish in 1808. In 1810 four additional parishes were created from the formerly Spanish West Florida territory—these are part of what is now referred to as the Florida Parishes.

By April 1812, Attakapas Parish became St. Martin Parish and St. Mary Parish. On April 30, the state was admitted to the Union with 25 parishes.

By 1820, Washington Parish was added, and Feliciana Parish split into West and East in 1824. The next year, Jefferson Parish was carved from Orleans Parish. By 1830, Claiborne Parish was created, and the old Warren Parish was mostly absorbed into Ouachita Parish, only to return as Carroll Parish a few years later.

In 1838, Caddo Parish was created from Natchitoches, as were Madison and Caldwell parishes in the east. In 1839, Union Parish was formed from Ouachita, and Calcasieu was formed from St. Landry in 1840.

Five parishes were created in 1843: Bossier, DeSoto, Franklin, Sabine, and Tensas. Morehouse Parish and Vermilion Parish were formed from Ouachita and Lafayette parishes, respectively, in 1844. The next year, Jackson Parish was formed, the old county units were abandoned, and the units were officially referred to as "parishes". In 1848, Bienville Parish was formed from Claiborne Parish. In 1852, Winn Parish was formed, while parishes further south added and lost land.

In 1853, Lafourche Interior Parish was renamed to Lafourche Parish. During Reconstruction, state government created a number of new parishes, with the first being Iberia and Richland parishes. Plans for creating a parish like Iberia from St. Martin and St. Mary parishes had dated from the 1840s. (A surveying error in Iberia's creation broke St. Martin Parish into two non-contiguous parts, making it and Norfolk County, Massachusetts as the only county-level units with their own exclaves.) Tangipahoa and Grant parishes followed in 1869. In 1870, the fifth Reconstruction parish, Cameron, was created, which was followed by the sixth, seventh, and eighth parishes (Red River, Vernon, and Webster, respectively) in 1871. The ninth parish to be formed under Radical Republican rule was Lincoln, named after the late president and formed in 1873. In 1877, the old parish of Carroll divided into East and West Carroll parishes, which are unofficially called the tenth and eleventh Reconstruction parishes, as the project ended that year.

No new parishes were formed until 1886, when Acadia Parish was formed from St. Landry. Again, no new parishes were formed, this time until 1908, when the western half of Catahoula parish became LaSalle parish.

In 1910, the parish count rose to 61 with the creation of Evangeline Parish, and the 62nd, 63rd, and 64th parishes (Allen, Beauregard, and Jefferson Davis) were created from areas of Calcasieu Parish. There were several minor boundary changes afterward, the most substantial being the division of Lake Pontchartrain among Tangipahoa, St. Tammany, Orleans, Jefferson, St. John the Baptist, and St. Charles Parishes in 1979.

== Listing ==
Parish	FIPS code	Parish Seat	Est.	Origin	Etymology	Population	Area	Map
Acadia Parish	001	Crowley	June 30, 1886	from part of St. Landry Parish.	From Acadian French. Named for the Acadians who settled the area.	57,032	658 sq mi (1,704 km^{2})	State map highlighting Acadia Parish
Allen Parish	003	Oberlin	=June 12, 1912	from part of Calcasieu Parish.	Henry Watkins Allen, the Confederate governor of Louisiana	22,672	766 sq mi (1,984 km^{2})	State map highlighting Allen Parish
Ascension Parish	005	Donaldsonville	=April 14, 1807	One of the original 19 parishes.	Named for the Ascension of Our Lord Catholic Church in Donaldsonville, Louisiana, which was named after the Ascension of Jesus into Heaven	135,105	303 sq mi (785 km^{2})	State map highlighting Ascension Parish
Assumption Parish	007	Napoleonville	April 14, 1807	One of the original 19 parishes.	Named for Church of the Assumption of the Blessed Virgin Mary in Plattenville, the oldest in the state, which was named after the Assumption of the Virgin Mary	19,720	364 sq mi (943 km^{2})	State map highlighting Assumption Parish
Avoyelles Parish	009	Marksville	April 14, 1807	One of the original 19 parishes.	The Avoyel Native American people	37,941	866 sq mi (2,243 km^{2})	State map highlighting Avoyelles Parish
Beauregard Parish	011	DeRidder	June 12, 1912	from part of Calcasieu Parish.	Confederate general P. G. T. Beauregard	36,673	1,166 sq mi (3,020 km^{2})	State map highlighting Beauregard Parish
Bienville Parish	013	Arcadia	March 14, 1848	from part of Claiborne Parish.	Named after the founder of the city of New Orleans, Jean-Baptiste Le Moyne de Bienville	12,269	822 sq mi (2,129 km^{2})	State map highlighting Bienville Parish
Bossier Parish	015	Benton	February 24, 1843	from part of Claiborne Parish.	U.S. Representative Pierre Bossier	131,867	867 sq mi (2,246 km^{2})	State map highlighting Bossier Parish
Caddo Parish	017	Shreveport	January 18, 1838	from part of Natchitoches Parish.	Named for the Caddo Native American people	224,226	937 sq mi (2,427 km^{2})	State map highlighting Caddo Parish
Calcasieu Parish	019	Lake Charles	March 12, 1840	from part of St. Landry Parish.	After the French form of the Atakapa name Katkōsh Yōk, meaning 'Crying Eagle', an Atakapa Native American leader	208,466	1,094 sq mi (2,833 km^{2})	State map highlighting Calcasieu Parish
Caldwell Parish	021	Columbia	March 6, 1838	from part of Catahoula Parish and Ouachita Parish.	Named for the Caldwell family, which owned a large plantation and remains politically active in the state.	9,344	541 sq mi (1,401 km^{2})	State map highlighting Caldwell Parish
Cameron Parish	023	Cameron	March 15, 1870	from parts of Calcasieu Parish and Vermilion Parish.	U.S. Secretary of War Simon Cameron	4,718	1,932 sq mi (5,004 km^{2})	State map highlighting Cameron Parish
Catahoula Parish	025	Harrisonburg	March 23, 1808	from parts of Ouachita Parish and Rapides Parish.	Catahoula Lake, formerly within the parish's boundaries and named from a Taensa/Natchez word meaning big, clear lake	8,223	739 sq mi (1,914 km^{2})	State map highlighting Catahoula Parish
Claiborne Parish	027	Homer	March 13, 1828	from part of Natchitoches Parish.	Governor of Louisiana William C. C. Claiborne	13,354	768 sq mi (1,989 km^{2})	State map highlighting Claiborne Parish
Concordia Parish	029	Vidalia	April 14, 1807	One of the original 19 parishes.	Name is of uncertain origin; may be from an early land grant called New Concordia, from the "concord" reached by local authorities over a mutual surrender of slaves or for a mansion called Concord which was owned by Spanish governor Manuel Gayoso de Lemos and located in Natchez, Mississippi	17,836	749 sq mi (1,940 km^{2})	State map highlighting Concordia Parish
DeSoto Parish	031	Mansfield	April 1, 1843	from parts of Caddo Parish and Natchitoches Parish.	Spanish explorer Hernando de Soto	27,381	895 sq mi (2,318 km^{2})	State map highlighting DeSoto Parish
East Baton Rouge Parish	033	Baton Rouge	December 22, 1810	from West Florida territory.	French bâton rouge meaning red stick. A red stake was used by local Native Americans to mark the boundaries between tribal territories	456,180	471 sq mi (1,220 km^{2})	State map highlighting East Baton Rouge Parish
East Carroll Parish	035	Lake Providence	March 26, 1877	when Carroll Parish was divided.	Charles Carroll of Carrollton, the last surviving signer of the U.S. Declaration of Independence	6,760	442 sq mi (1,145 km^{2})	State map highlighting East Carroll Parish
East Feliciana Parish	037	Clinton	February 17, 1824	when Feliciana Parish was divided.	Felicite de Gálvez, the wife of Bernardo de Gálvez, a Spanish governor of Louisiana (New Spain)	18,911	456 sq mi (1,181 km^{2})	State map highlighting East Feliciana Parish
Evangeline Parish	039	Ville Platte	June 15, 1910	from part of St. Landry Parish.	Acadian heroine of the poem "Evangeline" by Henry Wadsworth Longfellow	31,980	680 sq mi (1,761 km^{2})	State map highlighting Evangeline Parish
Franklin Parish	041	Winnsboro	March 1, 1843	from parts of Carroll Parish, Catahoula Parish, Madison Parish and Ouachita Parish	Founding Father Benjamin Franklin	19,002	636 sq mi (1,647 km^{2})	State map highlighting Franklin Parish
Grant Parish	043	Colfax	March 4, 1869	from parts of Rapides Parish and Winn Parish.	U.S. President Ulysses S. Grant	22,075	664 sq mi (1,720 km^{2})	State map highlighting Grant Parish
Iberia Parish	045	New Iberia	October 30, 1868	from parts of St. Martin Parish and St. Mary Parish.	Named by Spanish settlers in honor of the Iberian Peninsula	66,846	1,031 sq mi (2,670 km^{2})	State map highlighting Iberia Parish
Iberville Parish	047	Plaquemine	April 14, 1807	One of the original 19 parishes.	Explorer Pierre Le Moyne d'Iberville, the brother of Jean-Baptiste Le Moyne de Bienville	29,579	653 sq mi (1,691 km^{2})	State map highlighting Iberville Parish
Jackson Parish	049	Jonesboro	February 27, 1845	from parts of Claiborne Parish, Ouachita Parish and Union Parish	U.S. President Andrew Jackson	15,834	580 sq mi (1,502 km^{2})	State map highlighting Jackson Parish
Jefferson Parish	051	Gretna	February 11, 1825	from part of Orleans Parish	Founding Father Thomas Jefferson	431,398	642 sq mi (1,663 km^{2})	State map highlighting Jefferson Parish
Jefferson Davis Parish	053	Jennings	June 12, 1912	from part of Calcasieu Parish.	Jefferson Davis, president of the Confederate States of America	31,471	659 sq mi (1,707 km^{2})	State map highlighting Jefferson Davis Parish
Lafayette Parish	055	Lafayette	January 17, 1823	from part of St. Martin Parish.	French-born American Revolutionary War hero, the Marquis de Lafayette	257,949	270 sq mi (699 km^{2})	State map highlighting Lafayette Parish
Lafourche Parish	057	Thibodaux	April 14, 1807	One of the original 19 parishes. Was named Interior Parish until 1812 and Lafourche Interior Parish until 1853.	French phrase la fourche or in English, the fork; Bayou Lafourche, or Fork Bayou, is a fork of the Mississippi River	95,505	1,472 sq mi (3,812 km^{2})	State map highlighting Lafourche Parish
LaSalle Parish	059	Jena	July 3, 1908	from west half of Catahoula Parish.	Explorer René-Robert Cavelier, Sieur de La Salle	15,154	663 sq mi (1,717 km^{2})	State map highlighting LaSalle Parish
Lincoln Parish	061	Ruston	February 24, 1873	from parts of Bienville Parish, Claiborne Parish, Jackson Parish and Union Parish.	U.S. President Abraham Lincoln	48,360	472 sq mi (1,222 km^{2})	State map highlighting Lincoln Parish
Livingston Parish	063	Livingston	March 30, 1832	from part of St. Helena Parish.	U.S. Secretary of State Edward Livingston, brother of Robert R. Livingston who negotiated the Louisiana Purchase	155,036	703 sq mi (1,821 km^{2})	State map highlighting Livingston Parish
Madison Parish	065	Tallulah	January 19, 1838	from Concordia Parish.	U.S. President James Madison	8,844	651 sq mi (1,686 km^{2})	State map highlighting Madison Parish
Morehouse Parish	067	Bastrop	March 25, 1844	from parts of Carroll Parish and Ouachita Parish.	Abraham Morehouse, who led the first settlers into the region	23,705	805 sq mi (2,085 km^{2})	State map highlighting Morehouse Parish
Natchitoches Parish	069	Natchitoches	April 14, 1807	One of the original 19 parishes.	The Natchitoches Native American people	36,089	1,299 sq mi (3,364 km^{2})	State map highlighting Natchitoches Parish
Orleans Parish	071	New Orleans	April 14, 1807	One of the original 19 parishes. Today coterminous with the City of New Orleans.	Named after Philippe, Duke of Orléans, the regent of France	362,154	350 sq mi (906 km^{2})	State map highlighting Orleans Parish
Ouachita Parish	073	Monroe	April 14, 1807	One of the original 19 parishes.	The Ouachita Native American people	158,542	633 sq mi (1,639 km^{2})	State map highlighting Ouachita Parish
Plaquemines Parish	075	Pointe à la Hache	April 14, 1807	One of the original 19 parishes.	A word meaning persimmons created from the Louisiana Creole and the Atakapa language	22,256	2,429 sq mi (6,291 km^{2})	State map highlighting Plaquemines Parish
Pointe Coupee Parish	077	New Roads	April 14, 1807	One of the original 19 parishes.	French phrase la pointe coupée or in English, the cut-off point, which refers to a bend in the Mississippi River	19,520	591 sq mi (1,531 km^{2})	State map highlighting Pointe Coupee Parish
Rapides Parish	079	Alexandria	April 14, 1807	One of the original 19 parishes.	Named for local river rapids (French: rapides)	125,877	1,362 sq mi (3,528 km^{2})	State map highlighting Rapides Parish
Red River Parish	081	Coushatta	March 2, 1871	from parts of Bienville Parish, Bossier Parish, Caddo Parish and Natchitoches Parish.	Named for the Red River, which is part of the Mississippi River watershed	7,165	402 sq mi (1,041 km^{2})	State map highlighting Red River Parish
Richland Parish	083	Rayville	September 29, 1868	from parts of Carroll Parish, Franklin Parish, Morehouse Parish and Ouachita Parish.	Named for its rich land	19,582	564 sq mi (1,461 km^{2})	State map highlighting Richland Parish
Sabine Parish	085	Many	March 7, 1843	from parts of Caddo Parish and Natchitoches Parish.	Named for the Sabine River and the so-called Sabine Free State	21,834	1,012 sq mi (2,621 km^{2})	State map highlighting Sabine Parish
St. Bernard Parish	087	Chalmette	April 14, 1807	One of the original 19 parishes.	Saint Bernard, patron saint of Bernardo de Gálvez, the Spanish governor who granted land to the Canary Islanders settling the area in 1778	45,642	1,794 sq mi (4,646 km^{2})	State map highlighting St. Bernard Parish
St. Charles Parish	089	Hahnville	April 14, 1807	One of the original 19 parishes.	Saint Charles	50,586	410 sq mi (1,062 km^{2})	State map highlighting St. Charles Parish
St. Helena Parish	091	Greensburg	December 22, 1810	from West Florida territory.	Saint Helena	10,758	409 sq mi (1,059 km^{2})	State map highlighting St. Helena Parish
St. James Parish	093	Convent	April 14, 1807	One of the original 19 parishes.	Saint James the Great	18,938	258 sq mi (668 km^{2})	State map highlighting St. James Parish
St. John the Baptist Parish	095	Edgard	April 14, 1807	One of the original 19 parishes.	Saint John the Baptist	39,875	348 sq mi (901 km^{2})	State map highlighting St. John the Baptist Parish
St. Landry Parish	097	Opelousas	April 14, 1807	One of the original 19 parishes.	Saint Landry of Paris	80,765	939 sq mi (2,432 km^{2})	State map highlighting St. Landry Parish
St. Martin Parish	099	St. Martinville	April 17, 1811	One of the original 19 parishes.	Saint Martin of Tours	51,106	817 sq mi (2,116 km^{2})	State map highlighting St. Martin Parish
St. Mary Parish	101	Franklin	April 17, 1811	from part of St. Martin Parish.	Saint Mary	46,552	612 sq mi (1,585 km^{2})	State map highlighting St. Mary Parish
St. Tammany Parish	103	Covington	December 22, 1810	from West Florida territory.	Legendary Indian Chief Tamanend.	279,108	1,124 sq mi (2,911 km^{2})	State map highlighting St. Tammany Parish
Tangipahoa Parish	105	Amite City	March 6, 1869	from parts of Livingston Parish, St. Helena Parish, St. Tammany Parish and Washington Parish.	Comes from an Acolapissa word meaning ear of corn or those who gather corn	141,346	823 sq mi (2,132 km^{2})	State map highlighting Tangipahoa Parish
Tensas Parish	107	St. Joseph	March 17, 1843	from part of Concordia Parish.	The Taensa Native American people.	3,700	641 sq mi (1,660 km^{2})	State map highlighting Tensas Parish
Terrebonne Parish	109	Houma	March 22, 1822	from part of Lafourche Interior Parish.	French phrase terre bonne or in English, "good earth"	104,163	2,080 sq mi (5,387 km^{2})	State map highlighting Terrebonne Parish
Union Parish	111	Farmerville	March 13, 1839	from part of Ouachita Parish.	Named for the union of states which make up the U.S.	20,561	905 sq mi (2,344 km^{2})	State map highlighting Union Parish
Vermilion Parish	113	Abbeville	March 25, 1844	from part of Lafayette Parish.	Both the Vermilion River and Vermilion Bay	57,671	1,538 sq mi (3,983 km^{2})	State map highlighting Vermilion Parish
Vernon Parish	115	Leesville	March 30, 1871	from parts of Natchitoches Parish, Rapides Parish and Sabine Parish.	Mount Vernon, the home of George Washington, the first U.S. President	45,091	1,341 sq mi (3,473 km^{2})	State map highlighting Vernon Parish
Washington Parish	117	Franklinton	March 6, 1819	from part of St. Tammany Parish.	U.S. President George Washington	44,937	676 sq mi (1,751 km^{2})	State map highlighting Washington Parish
Webster Parish	119	Minden	February 27, 1871	from parts of Bienville Parish, Bossier Parish and Claiborne Parish.	U.S. Secretary of State Daniel Webster	34,948	615 sq mi (1,593 km^{2})	State map highlighting Webster Parish
West Baton Rouge Parish	121	Port Allen	April 14, 1807	One of the original 19 parishes. Was named Baton Rouge Parish until 1812.	French phrase bâton rouge meaning red stick. A red stick was used by local Native Americans to mark the boundaries between tribal territories	28,756	203 sq mi (526 km^{2})	State map highlighting West Baton Rouge Parish
West Carroll Parish	123	Oak Grove	March 26, 1877	when Carroll Parish was divided.	Charles Carroll of Carrollton, the last surviving signer of the U.S. Declaration of Independence	9,156	360 sq mi (932 km^{2})	State map highlighting West Carroll Parish
West Feliciana Parish	125	St. Francisville	February 17, 1824	when Feliciana Parish was divided.	Felicite de Gálvez, the wife of Bernardo de Gálvez, a Spanish governor of Louisiana (New Spain)	15,134	426 sq mi (1,103 km^{2})	State map highlighting West Feliciana Parish
Winn Parish	127	Winnfield	February 24, 1852	from parts of Catahoula Parish, Natchitoches Parish and Rapides Parish.	Louisiana state legislator Walter Winn	14,961	957 sq mi (2,479 km^{2})	State map highlighting Winn Parish

== Former parishes ==
- Attakapas Parish existed from 1807 to 1811.
- Biloxi Parish formed in 1811 from West Florida territory. It was eliminated in 1812 when it was transferred to the Mississippi Territory.
- Carroll Parish formed in 1838 from part of Ouachita Parish. In 1877, it was divided into East Carroll Parish and West Carroll Parish.
- Feliciana Parish formed in 1810 from West Florida territory. In 1824, it was divided into East Feliciana Parish and West Feliciana Parish.
- Pascagoula Parish formed in 1811 from West Florida territory. It was eliminated in 1812 when it was transferred to the Mississippi Territory.
- Warren Parish formed in 1811 from part of Concordia Parish, and merged into Concordia Parish and Ouachita Parish in 1814.

== Territorial counties ==
On April 10, 1805, the Territorial Council enacted a map dividing the territory into 12 counties based upon ecclesiastical districts established under Spanish rule. In 1807, the Territorial Council revised the 12-county system to create 19 civil parishes.

The original twelve counties defined by the Territorial Legislative Council in 1805 were:

- Acadia County – Parishes of St. James and the Ascension (also known as the First and Second Acadian Coasts). In 1807, divided into Ascension and St. James parishes.
- Attakapas County – Parish of St. Martin. In 1807, renamed Attakapas Parish. In 1811, it was subdivided into St. Martin and St. Mary parishes.
- Concordia County – The only portion not part of preexisting ecclesiastical district. In 1807, renamed Concordia Parish.
- German Coast County – Parishes of St. Charles and St. John the Baptist (also known as the First and Second German Coasts). In 1807, divided into St. Charles and St. John the Baptist parishes.
- Iberville County – Parish of St. Gabriel and part Parish of St. Bernard. In 1807, renamed Iberville Parish.
- Lafourche County – Parish of Assumption. In 1807, divided into Assumption and Lafourche Interior parishes.
- Natchitoches County – Parish of St. Francis. In 1807, renamed Natchitoches Parish.
- Opelousas County – Parish of St. Landry. In 1807, renamed St. Landry Parish.
- Orleans County – All territory on both sides of the "Mississippi from the Balize to the beginning of the parishes of St. Bernard and St. Louis." In 1807, divided into Orleans, St. Bernard, and Plaquemines parishes.
- Ouachita County – The Ouachita settlements. In 1807, renamed Ouachita Parish.
- Pointe Coupée County – The Parish of St. Francis. In 1807, divided into Baton Rouge and Pointe Coupée parishes.
- Rapides County – The settlements of Rapides, Avoyelles, Catahoula, Bayou Boeuf, Bayou Robert, and other settlements in the region. In 1807, divided into Avoyelles and Rapides parishes.

On December 7, 1810, William C. C. Claiborne, governor of the Orleans Territory, annexed the short-lived Republic of West Florida to the United States and Louisiana as Feliciana County. On December 22, 1810, the county west of the Pearl River was organized in four civil parishes: East Baton Rouge, Feliciana, St. Helena, and St. Tammany. Later, in 1824, Feliciana Parish was divided into East Feliciana and West Feliciana parishes.

== Fictional parishes ==
- In the novels Little Altars Everywhere, Divine Secrets of the Ya-Ya Sisterhood, and Ya-Yas in Bloom, author Rebecca Wells created the fictional Garnet Parish.
- The movie Steel Magnolias was said to take place in the fictional Chinquapin Parish, likely a suburban parish of Shreveport. However, the movie was shot in Natchitoches, and involved several elements of culture indicative of the town and parish of the same name. For example, the annual Christmas Festival of Lights in Natchitoches is shown, as are Cajun dance styles with a distinctive country-Cajun band. (Natchitoches is in the Crossroads region of Louisiana, where southern Louisiana's predominantly Catholic, Cajun culture meets the primarily Protestant, Anglo culture of northern Louisiana.)
- Part of Walter Jon Williams' novel The Rift is set in the fictional Spottswood Parish.
- The Southern Vampire Mysteries series of novels written by Charlaine Harris and HBO's True Blood, which is based on the novels, take place in the fictional northwestern Louisiana Renard Parish.
- In the movie In the Electric Mist, Deputy Jason J. Bayard was from the fictional St. Clare Parish.
- In the DC Comics Universe, Belle Reve Parish is a parish in Louisiana that contains the Belle Reve Penitentiary.
- In the movie The Green Mile, a fictional parish named Trapingus Parish is featured in the movie. The film was actually shot in Tennessee.
- In the Cinemax TV series Banshee, Chayton Littlestone is seen fighting in the fictional Sang Tholis Parish, which is said to be in New Orleans. "Sang" is the French word for "blood", but could also be a dialect for "sans", without. "Tholis" is not a French word. In reality, the city of New Orleans is located entirely in Orleans Parish.
- In the movie Doctor Detroit, protagonist Clifford Skridlow (played by Dan Aykroyd) appears in a Detroit court as a stereotypical (based on "Atticus Finch" in To Kill a Mockingbird) Southern attorney from Bay Saint Louis Parish.
- In the 2017 video game Resident Evil 7: Biohazard, the vast majority of the game takes place in the fictional Dulvey Parish, somewhere on the coast.
- The "Faster, Baby!" DLC for Mafia III, also a 2017 video game, takes place in Sinclair Parish just west of the fictional city of 'New Bordeaux', a fictional version of New Orleans set in 1968.
- In the 1973 James Bond film Live and Let Die, Sheriff J.W. Pepper (Clifton James) of Pontrain Parish is featured as a supporting character. The parish name is likely derived from the real Lake Pontchartrain.
- In Season 2 of Designated Survivor a flu outbreak originates in South Carroll Parish.
- The television series Queen Sugar is set in St. Josephine Parish, which borders Orleans Parish and is where the titular family; the Bordelon's, reside.
- The 2006 sequel movie Road House 2 is set in the coastal Tyree Parish.
- The 2011 crime thriller film Catch .44 takes place in Civil Parish, with one of the antagonists stealing a parish sheriff deputy's uniform.
- The 2013 action thriller Homefront takes place in the fictional Labranche Parish, possibly named after or inspired by the real LaBranche Plantation Dependency.
- The 2014 supernatural horror film Jessabelle is set in the fictional Feliciana Parish, a genericised version of West Feliciana Parish.
- In the DC Universe series Swamp Thing, the primary setting is Montrivelle Parish. The county seat of the parish is the also fictional city of Marais.
- In the 1972 movie Buck and the Preacher starring Sidney Poitier, Harry Belafonte and Ruby Dee, the members of the rescued wagon train were former slaves from the fictional St. Ann Parish.
- The 1993 novel A Lesson Before Dying takes place in St. Raphael Parish.
- In the movie Sounder, Rhyle is a parish in Louisiana where the white church is located that scared Nathan Lee when he entered.

== See also ==
- List of United States counties and county equivalents
