= Hotel Monteleone =

Hotel in New Orleans, Louisiana, U.S.

Coordinates: 29.9542°N 90.0682°W

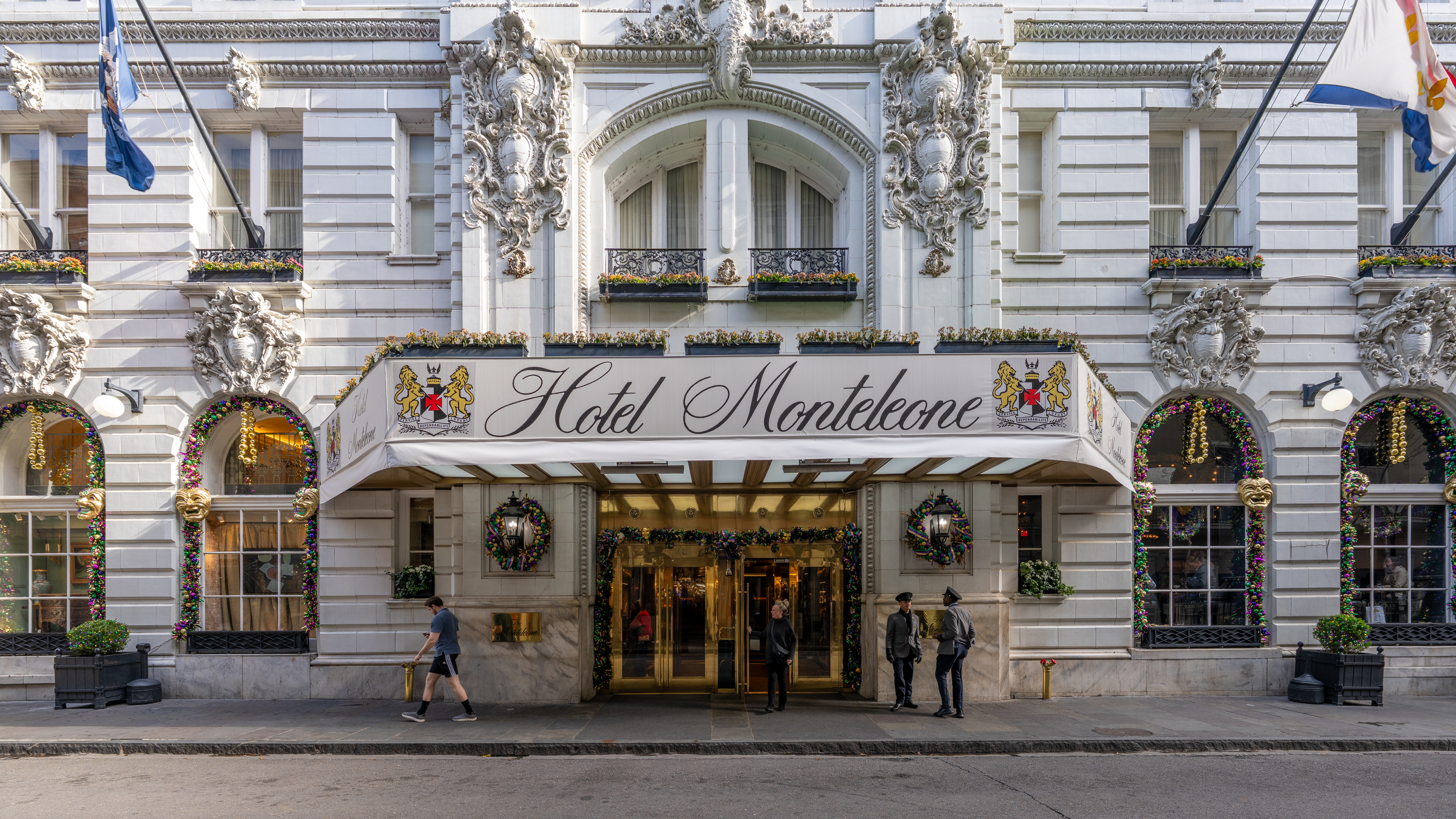

Hotel Monteleone is a family-owned and operated hotel located at 214 Royal Street in the French Quarter of New Orleans, Louisiana, U.S. The hotel includes the only high-rise building in the interior French Quarter and is well known for its Carousel Piano Bar & Lounge, a rotating bar.

Built in 1886 in the Beaux-Arts architectural style with an eclectic flair, Hotel Monteleone is a historic landmark and a member of Historic Hotels of America, the official program of the National Trust for Historic Preservation. The hotel has 570 guest rooms, including 50 suites.

== History ==
Antonio Monteleone arrived in New Orleans from Sicily around the year 1880. A cobbler by trade, Monteleone set up shop on Royal Street, then a center of commerce and banking.

In 1886, Monteleone purchased a small hotel on the corner of Royal and Iberville streets. When the nearby Commercial Hotel became available for purchase, Monteleone took the opportunity to expand.

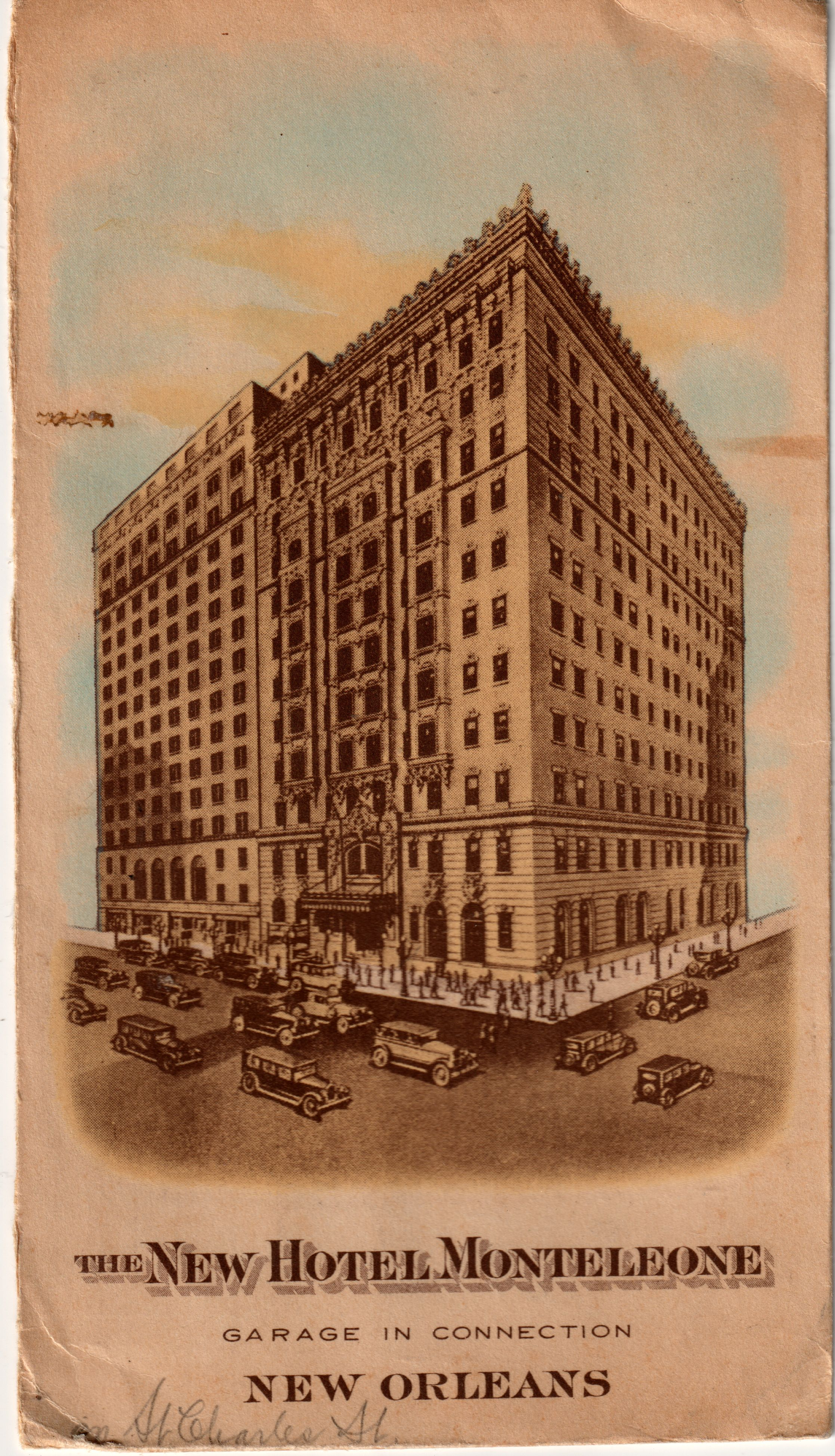
The New Hotel Monteleone New Orleans, 1928 illustration on hotel stationery

Since then, Hotel Monteleone has experienced five major expansions. Thirty rooms were added in 1903. Then, in 1908, 300 more rooms were added and the hotel's name was changed from the Commercial Hotel to Hotel Monteleone. In 1913, Antonio Monteleone died, and the business passed to his son Frank, who in 1928 added 200 more rooms, a year before the stock market crash that presaged the Great Depression.

One of the few family-owned hotels in the nation to survive the Depression, Hotel Monteleone remained unchanged until the fourth expansion in 1954. That year the original building was demolished, and the foundation was laid for a new building that would include guest facilities, ballrooms, dining rooms, and cocktail lounges. Frank Monteleone died in 1958 and was succeeded by his son, Bill. In 1964, the fifth and final major expansion saw the addition of more floors, more guest rooms, and a Sky Terrace with swimming pools and cocktail lounges. The hotel was well known as hosting the election campaign headquarters of Governor Edwin Edwards over his five campaigns from 1972 to 1991.

In 2011 Bill died and his son William Jr. took over. It remains one of the few long-standing, family-owned hotels in the nation.

== Literary landmark ==
The hotel has also become associated with New Orleans ghost folklore and paranormal tourism culture, with recurring stories involving unexplained elevator activity, sightings of children, and alleged apparitions reported by guests and staff.

Hotel Monteleone was a favorite of many Southern authors. References to the Hotel Monteleone and its Carousel Bar are included in Tennessee Williams' The Rose Tattoo and Orpheus Descending, Rebecca Wells' Divine Secrets of the Ya-Ya Sisterhood and Little Altars Everywhere, Stephen Ambrose's Band of Brothers, Richard Ford's A Piece of My Heart, Eudora Welty's A Curtain of Green, Gerald Clarke's Capote: A Biography; Erle Stanley Gardner's Owls Don't Blink (written under the pen name A.A. Fair), Ernest Hemingway's "Night Before Battle" (published in The Complete Short Stories of Ernest Hemingway) Harry Stephen Keeler's The Voice of the Seven Sparrows and John Grisham's The Reckoning.

Ernest Hemingway, Tennessee Williams, and William Faulkner made a point of staying at the Hotel Monteleone while visiting New Orleans. During an appearance on The Tonight Show, Truman Capote once claimed that he was born in the Hotel Monteleone. (He wasn't; his mother lived at the hotel during her pregnancy, but she safely made it to the hospital in time for Truman's birth.) Anne Rice, Stephen Ambrose, and John Grisham have also stayed at the hotel.

In June 1999, the hotel was designated an official literary landmark by the Friends of the Library Association. The Plaza and Algonquin Hotels in New York City are the only other hotels in the U.S. which share this honor.

== Carousel Bar ==
Hotel Monteleone's Carousel Piano Bar & Lounge is the only revolving bar in New Orleans. (For a few decades, there was a rotating cocktail lounge at 2 Canal Street, overlooking the Mississippi River.) The 25-seat carousel bar turns on 2,000 large steel rollers, pulled by a chain powered by a one-quarter horsepower (190 W) motor at a constant rate of one revolution every 15 minutes.

During the 1950s and 1960s, the Carousel Bar was also the site of a popular nightclub, the Swan Room, where musicians such as Liberace and Louis Prima performed. The Carousel Bar was originally installed in 1949.

== In film ==
- 1999: Double Jeopardy – Starring Ashley Judd and Tommy Lee Jones. Filmed in lobby, front of hotel, and the Carousel Bar transformed into the Armani Shop.
- 2004: Glory Road – A Jerry Bruckheimer production. Starring Josh Lucas, Derek Luke, and Jon Voight. Filmed in lobby and also in a built set in storage area. Hotel featured as fancy hotel lobby in a different city. Conference space was set aside for extras.
- 2005: The Last Time – Starring Brendan Fraser and Michael Keaton. Filmed in lobby, Carousel Bar, Hunt Room Grill, Bagatelle, and Engineer.
- 2008: 12 Rounds – Starring John Cena. Filmed in Vieux Carre Suite (#1480), 14th-floor hallway, roof by the marquis, boiler room, garage freight elevator, lobby, and front of hotel.
- 2017: Girls Trip
