= Pendennis (disambiguation) =

Pendennis may refer to:

- Pendennis, a novel by the English author Thackeray.
- Pendennis Castle, a castle in Cornwall.
- RMS Pendennis Castle, a ship.
- GWR 4073 Class 4079 Pendennis Castle, a steam locomotive.
- Pendennis Club, a private club in Louisville, Kentucky.
- Pendennis Club (cocktail), a cocktail invented at this club.
- Pendennis, a town in Kansas, United States.
- HMS Pendennis (1679), a British warship.
- HMS Pendennis (1695), a British warship.
