= Cassidy's Restaurant and Bar =

Restaurant in Portland, Oregon, U.S.

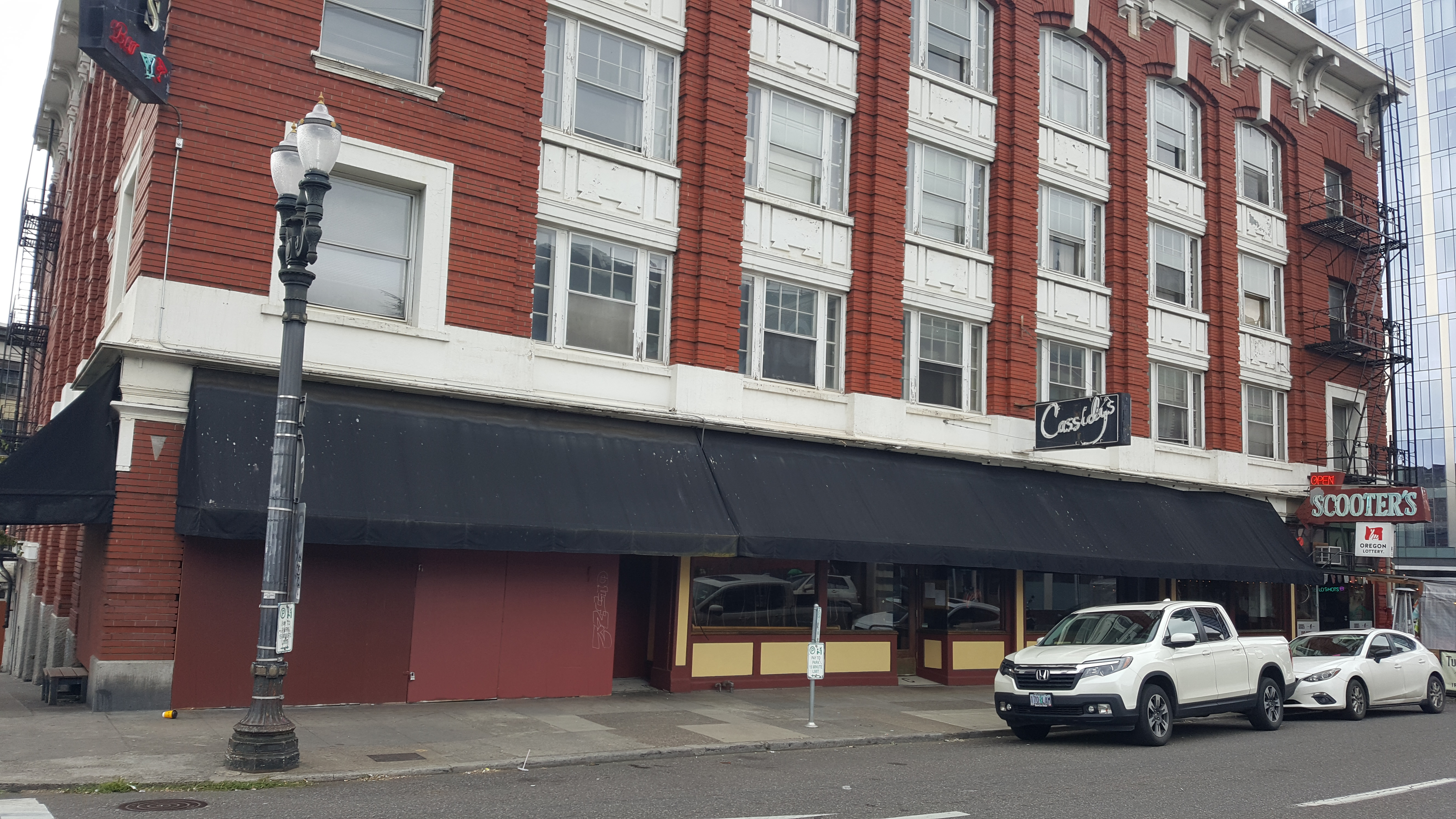
- The restaurant's exterior, 2022
- Interactive map of Cassidy's Restaurant and Bar

Restaurant information
- Established: 1979
- Owner: Bob Cassidy
- Location: 1331 Southwest Washington Street, Portland, Multnomah, Oregon, 97205, United States
- Coordinates: 45.5225°N 122.6853°W
- Website: cassidysrestaurant.com

Cassidy's Restaurant and Bar, or simply Cassidy's, is a restaurant in Portland, Oregon.

== Description ==
Cassidy's is a restaurant on Washington Street in southwest Portland's West End district. Portland Monthly has said, "For over three decades, this dimly lit downtown bar and restaurant has been serving late night crowds. Menu staples include local seafood, braised short rib, pork belly, pasta and salad." The interior features an ornate bar and dark-wood paneling. The menu also includes pork belly ramen, a cheeseburger on a brioche bun, and the Sazerac.

== History ==
Cassidy's was established in 1979. Bob Cassidy is the owner. In 2021, a fire on an above floor caused smoke and water damage, forcing the restaurant to close temporarily. The restaurant shared a building with a residential living center prior to Taft Home's closure in late 2021. In 2024, the building was purchased by the co-owner of McMenamins.

== Reception ==
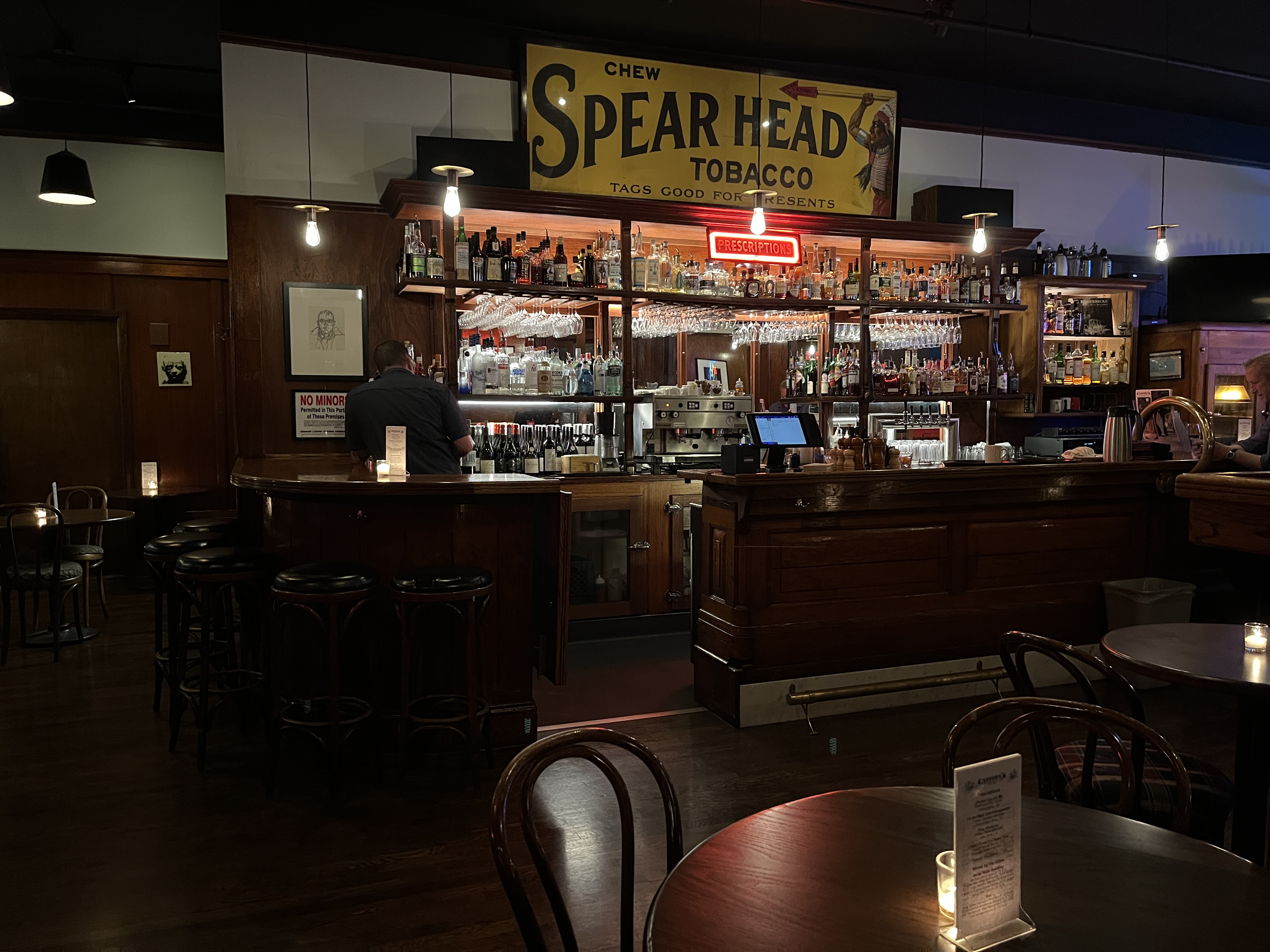
The restaurant's interior, 2023

In her Insiders' Guide to Portland, Oregon, Rachel Dresbeck wrote, "Cassidy's reputation as a good late-night bar is so firm that we sometimes forget how good the food is. Premium-cut meats, crispy Wallapa Bay oysters with spicy cocktail sauce, creamy pastas—all these go beautifully with the local wines and microbrews that Cassidy's also features. The bar's dark paneling and old-fashioned wooden refrigerators remind us of Boston or New York, but the food and drinks are definitely Portland." Michael Russell included Cassidy's in The Oregonian's 2014 list of "the top 10 classic Portland bars". He characterized the clientele as "off-duty bartenders and undercover rock stars" and said the restaurant's signature drink is "a pint of Anchor Steam, always on draft". He wrote:

A clean, well-lighted place on the very edge of downtown, Cassidy's feels older than its 35 years thanks to a worn wooden bar, oak-paneled walls and an air of casual permanence. Long a favorite of actors and audiences of Artists Repertory Theatre, the bar these days tends attract the older fans of whatever band's playing around the corner at the Crystal Ballroom, drawn by an excellent seasonal menu, pleasant service and the absence of teenagers. The restaurant's skilled servers, friendly but unwilling to put up with nonsense, reinforce the adults-only vibe. Cassidy's happy hour offers some excellent deals ($8 burgers, $7 croque-madames) despite not being much of a happy-hour hangout, which makes it an excellent destination for a quiet, anonymous after-work escape.

Samantha Bakall included Cassidy's in the newspaper's 2016 "ultimate guide to downtown Portland's best happy hours". She wrote, "For the low admission price of one drink, post up at this classic downtown happy hour spot steps away from the Crystal Ballroom. Hearty plates like burgers, mac n’ cheese, breakfast for dinner and more range from $5–$8." In 2019, Thomas Ross of the Portland Mercury wrote:

Unlike other downtown spots that claim to be open 'late,' the posted hours at Cassidy's promise service until 2 am, every damn night. When it's after midnight and you're feeling good (not great) and you need a burger and a $5.50 well drink—and want to be swaddled in dark wood and frosted glass and an orange-lit sign above the bar that says PRESCRIPTIONS—Cassidy's is the neon beacon pulling you by the liver. And by the way, just because that fat, juicy burger comes with fries doesn't mean you don't deserve some Brussels sprouts (in a slow-burning lemon preserve vinaigrette) or a hearty mac ’n’ cheese, too.
