= Divine Secrets of the Ya-Ya Sisterhood (film) =

2002 American film by Callie Khouri

- Theatrical release poster
- Directed by: Callie Khouri
- Screenplay by: Callie Khouri
- Adaptation by: Mark Andrus
- Based on: Divine Secrets of the Ya-Ya Sisterhood and Little Altars Everywhere by Rebecca Wells
- Produced by: Bonnie Bruckheimer; Hunt Lowry; Bette Midler
- Starring: Sandra Bullock; Ellen Burstyn; Fionnula Flanagan; James Garner; Ashley Judd; Shirley Knight; Angus Macfadyen; Maggie Smith
- Cinematography: John Bailey
- Edited by: Andrew Marcus
- Music by: T-Bone Burnett; David Mansfield
- Production company: Gaylord Films
- Distributed by: Warner Bros. Pictures
- Release date: June 7, 2002
- Running time: 116 minutes
- Country: United States
- Language: English
- Budget: $27 million
- Box office: $73.8 million

Divine Secrets of the Ya-Ya Sisterhood is a 2002 American comedy-drama film starring an ensemble cast headed by Sandra Bullock, co-written and directed by Callie Khouri. It is based on Rebecca Wells' 1996 novel of the same name and its 1992 prequel collection of short stories, Little Altars Everywhere.

== Plot ==
In 1937 Louisiana, four little girls in the woods at night take a blood oath of loyalty to one another, led by Vivi Abbott, who dubs the group the "Ya-Ya Sisterhood."

In 2002 New York City, Vivi's eldest daughter, playwright Siddalee "Sidda" Walker, gives an interview with a reporter from Time, mentioning her unhappy childhood as a major source of inspiration for her work. The reporter sensationalizes Sidda's complaint, implying abuse and deep, dark family secrets. The article upsets Vivi, who calls Sidda and angrily declares that she is dead to her. Vivi cuts Sidda from her will, and Sidda disinvites Vivi from her upcoming wedding to fiancé Connor McGill.

Still friends despite the years, the other Ya-Ya Sisters, Caro Benett, Teensy Whitman, and Necie Kelleher, decide to take the matter into their own hands. They kidnap Sidda in New York by drugging her drink and take her back to Louisiana, hoping to show her how Vivi's troubled past has caused her present issues, including her fight with Sidda.

As the Sisters show Sidda Vivi's scrapbook, Divine Secrets of the Ya-Ya Sisterhood, a series of flashbacks depicts Vivi's turbulent history from her childhood to Sidda's, which include Vivi witnessing racism at Teensy's aunt and uncle's house, being falsely accused of incest with her father Taylor by her bitter and jealous mother Buggy, and losing the love of her life Jack Whitman, Teensy's older brother, to an airplane crash in World War II. Sidda is unmoved in her opinion of Vivi as self-centered and helpless, and is so upset she tells Connor she wants to postpone their wedding. It is revealed that the main source of conflict in Sidda and Vivi's relationship is an incident where Vivi had a nervous breakdown and brutally beat Sidda and her siblings. Unbeknownst to Sidda, Vivi had been prescribed a dangerous dosage of antidepressant Dexamyl, which caused her erratic behavior; she had to be hospitalized following the incident.

With this revelation, Sidda finally understands her mother's suffering. Vivi and Sidda reconcile, and Sidda decides that she wants to marry Connor in Louisiana. Vivi and the Sisters induct Sidda into the Ya-Ya Sisterhood.

== Cast ==
- Sandra Bullock as Siddalee "Sidda" Walker
  - Allison Bertolino as child Siddalee "Sidda" Walker
- Angus Macfadyen as Connor McGill
- Ellen Burstyn as Viviane Joan "Vivi" Abbott Walker
  - Ashley Judd as young Viviane Joan "Vivi" Abbott-Walker
  - Caitlin Wachs as child Joan "Vivi" Abbott
- James Garner as Shepherd James "Shep" Walker
  - David Lee Smith as young Shepherd James "Shep" Walker
- Maggie Smith as Caroline Eliza "Caro" Brewer Bennett
  - Katy Selverstone as young Eliza "Caro" Brewer
  - Mary Katherine Weiss as child Eliza "Caro" Brewer
- Fionnula Flanagan as Aimee Malissa "Teensy" Whitman
  - Jacqueline McKenzie as young Aimee Malissa "Teensy" Whitman
  - Alyssa May Gold as child Aimee Malissa "Teensy" Whitman
- Shirley Knight as Denise Rose "Necie" Kelleher Ogden
  - Kiersten Warren as young Denise Rose "Necie" Kelleher
  - Nicki Tschudi as child Denise Rose "Necie" Kelleher
- Matthew Settle as Lieutenant Jack Whitman
- Cherry Jones as "Buggy" Abbott, Vivi's Mother
- David Rasche as Taylor Abbot, Vivi's Father
- Gina McKee as Genevieve Whitman, Teensy's Mother
- Mark Joy as Mr. Whitman, Teensy's Father

== Reception ==
=== Box office ===
Divine Secrets grossed a domestic total of $69,599,016 and $4,240,224 outside the States, totaling $73,839,240 worldwide. The film opened at #2 the weekend of its release with $16,167,412 behind The Sum of All Fears's second weekend.

=== Critical response ===
Divine Secrets of the Ya-Ya Sisterhood received a mixed response from film critics. The film holds a 44% "Rotten" rating on the review aggregator Rotten Tomatoes with the consensus, "Divine Secrets of the Ya-Ya Sisterhood is more melodramatic than emotionally truthful, and uneven in its mixture of time periods, actresses, laughter and tears." Metacritic, which uses a weighted average, assigned the film a score of 48 out of 100, based on 35 critics, indicating "mixed or average" reviews. Audiences polled by CinemaScore gave the film an average grade of "A" on an A+ to F scale.

Roger Ebert of the Chicago Sun-Times gave the film only one-and-a-half out of four stars, writing, "The Ya-Ya Sisterhood is rubber-stamped from the same mold that has produced an inexhaustible supply of fictional Southern belles who drink too much, talk too much, think about themselves too much, try too hard to be the most unforgettable character you've ever met, and are, in general, insufferable." He added, "There is not a character in the movie with a shred of plausibility, not an event that is believable, not a confrontation that is not staged, not a moment that is not false."

Todd McCarthy of Variety similarly remarked, "While there are pleasures to be had from watching so many grand actresses strut their stuff, the fact is that the overriding preoccupation here rests with surface impressions rather than psychological probity." Michael O'Sullivan of The Washington Post said, "What is perhaps most disappointing about this ham-handed film, though, particularly since it was directed by the screenwriter of the righteously raging Thelma and Louise is its crypto-misogyny."

Conversely, Stephen Holden of The New York Times gave the film a more positive review, describing it as "resolutely for and about women" and observing, "For all its failed connections, Divine Secrets of the Ya-Ya Sisterhood is nurturing, in a gauzy, dithering way." Kenneth Turan of the Los Angeles Times also praised the film, saying, "This is a work of excess and passion, an untidy sprawl of a motion picture that is sometimes ragged, occasionally uncertain, but--and this is what's important--always warm, accessible and rich in emotional life."
