= Vieux Carré (cocktail) =

Cocktail made with whiskey, brandy, and Bénédictine

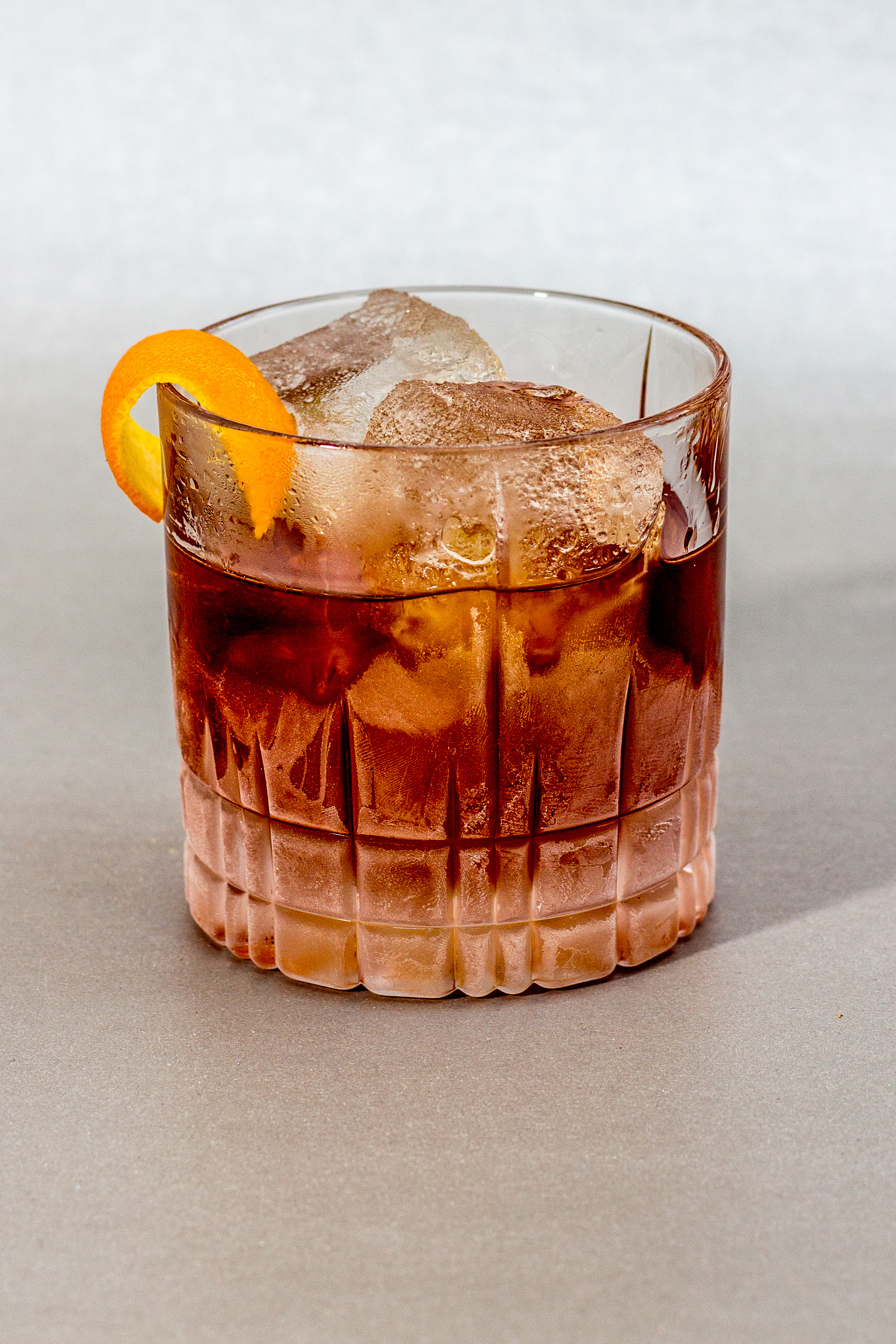
- A Vieux Carré
- Type: Cocktail
- Ingredients: 30 ml rye whiskey; 30 ml cognac; 30 ml sweet vermouth; 1 bar spoon Bénédictine; 2 dashes Peychaud's bitters
- Base spirit: Rye whiskey, Cognac
- Standard drinkware: Cocktail glass
- Standard garnish: Orange zest and maraschino cherry
- Served: Straight up: chilled, without ice
- Preparation: Pour all ingredients into mixing glass with ice cubes. Stir well. Strain into a chilled cocktail glass.

The Vieux Carré (French: [vjø ka.ʁe]) is an IBA official cocktail made with rye whiskey, cognac, sweet vermouth, Bénédictine, and Peychaud's bitters. It originated with Walter Bergeron, a bartender at the Carousel Bar in Hotel Monteleone, New Orleans. The name is French for "old square”, in reference to the city's French Quarter neighborhood. The drink is classified as one of the Unforgettables by the IBA.

== See also ==
- List of cocktails
