= Bette (TV series) =

American sitcom television series

- Genre: Sitcom
- Created by: Jeffrey Lane
- Starring: Bette Midler; Kevin Dunn; James Dreyfus; Marina Malota; Joanna Gleason; Lindsay Lohan; Robert Hays
- Opening theme: "Nobody Else But You"
- Composer: Alf Clausen
- Country of origin: United States
- Original language: English
- No. of seasons: 1
- No. of episodes: 18 (2 unaired)

Production
- Executive producers: Bonnie Bruckheimer; Bette Midler; Jeffrey Lane; Andrew D. Weyman
- Producers: Kathy Landsberg; Meg DeLoatch
- Production locations: Los Angeles, California
- Cinematography: Bobby Byrne; Gil Hubbs
- Running time: 30 minutes
- Production companies: D-Train Productions; All Girl Productions; CBS Productions; Columbia TriStar Television

Original release
- Network: CBS
- Release: October 11, 2000 – March 7, 2001

Bette is an American sitcom television series that premiered on October 11, 2000, on the CBS network. The show was the debut of Bette Midler in a lead TV series role. Sixteen episodes were aired on CBS, with its final telecast on March 7, 2001. Eighteen episodes in total were produced, with the final two only broadcast on HDTV simulcasting and in foreign markets. Bette was created by Jeffrey Lane, with Midler serving as one of the executive producers.

Midler called the show her biggest regret during a podcast in 2024.

== Synopsis ==
The sitcom had Midler playing a fictionalized version of herself – a "divine celebrity" who is adored by her fans. To provide some ambiguity, neither Bette's last name nor that of her on-screen family's was used, to create the offset that there was some difference between the star's real-life and TV persona. There were several similarities to Midler's actual career through the show's run, as the character of Bette had – and directly performed – many of the real-life Midler's past hit songs and achievements. The core of the stories focused on Bette's personal life in her luxurious Los Angeles home. Her husband of nearly 20 years, Roy (Kevin Dunn, eps. 1–12; Robert Hays, eps. 16–18) was an earnest college history professor, and their 13-year-old daughter, Rose (Lindsay Lohan, pilot episode; Marina Malota, eps. 2–18) was bright, active, and not the least bit fazed by her mother's celebrity. Embarking with Bette on her long, wild journey around showbiz was her hardworking best friend and manager Connie Randolph (Joanna Gleason). Refined Englishman Oscar (James Dreyfus) was Bette's veteran musical director/accompanist, who had an obsession with tabloid media and was always on the lookout for new, strange exploitations of Bette. During the series' run, slightly fictional Bette recorded a new album, engaged in hijinks at awards shows, won a Grammy, made guest roles on series such as JAG and Family Law (a cross promotion by CBS), and starred in a TV Halloween special with Dolly Parton (who appeared as herself and was said to be a longtime friend of the Bette character; Parton and Midler were friends in real life). Other stories were out of the spotlight and closer to home; in one, Bette volunteered at Rose's school with surprising results, and in another, flashbacks were shown depicting the first time Bette met Connie, Roy, and Oscar (in that order), along with one featuring the birth of Rose.

== Cast ==
- Bette Midler as Bette
- Kevin Dunn (eps. 1–12) and Robert Hays (eps. 16–18) as Roy
- Lindsay Lohan (pilot) and Marina Malota (eps. 2–18) as Rose
- Joanna Gleason as Connie Randolph
- James Dreyfus as Oscar

Many of Midler's celebrity friends appeared as themselves during the show's short run. Guest stars included Danny DeVito, George Segal, Brenda Song, Sharon Lawrence, Tim Curry, David James Elliott, Oprah Winfrey, Ashley Tisdale, Tony Danza, Dolly Parton, Olivia Newton-John, Jon Lovitz, Kobe Bryant and the ladies from rival network ABC's The View all as themselves.

== Production ==
=== Recasts ===
When Bette went into production, Lindsay Lohan was the original choice to play Rose. After the completion of the pilot episode, Midler decided that the series would shoot in Los Angeles, instead of New York City, where the pilot was filmed. 14-year-old Lohan did not want to continually commute from her family's current residence in New York City, due to the lengthy filming schedule for a TV series (typically 22 episodes per season). As a result, Marina Malota was cast in the role of Rose for the series' run. However the decision was made not to reshoot Lohan's scenes for the pilot episode with Malota in the role.

Several episodes into the series, Kevin Dunn grew unhappy with the increasingly minimal role and lack of development his character Roy was facing. After filming the series' 11th episode, CBS agreed to let Dunn out of his contract. Dunn was credited for one further episode for contractual reasons. The character of Roy was left offscreen for four episodes while the role was recast. Ultimately, Robert Hays was cast. In his first episode, A Brand New Roy, the cold open makes joking mention of the changes in Roy's appearance. Hays only filmed two episodes of Bette before its cancellation. One of his episodes - and another filmed before he was cast - were never aired by CBS, and his debut episode was the final to air on the network.

=== Cancellation ===
Although the series premiered to nearly 16 million viewers in October 2000 - aided by prominently featured special guest stars in the early episodes - ratings dropped significantly by December. Midler was open about the challenges of adhering to a weekly television schedule, and was reported not to enjoy the daily process. By the time its 15th episode aired in February 2001, the series was averaging 9 million viewers. CBS officially cancelled the series on March 6, with the 16th episode airing the following day. Two additional episodes had been completed, and would air in foreign markets.

== Episodes ==
| No. | Title | Directed by | Written by | Original release date | Viewers (millions) |
|---|---|---|---|---|---|
| 1 | "Pilot" | Andrew D. Weyman | Jeffrey Lane | October 11, 2000 | 15.72 |
After Danny DeVito offers her a guest starring role as his mother in a new TV series, Bette (Bette Midler) goes overboard trying to rejuvenate herself. This is the only episode to feature Lindsay Lohan as Bette's daughter, Rose, as she did not stay with the series when it was picked up for a full season.
| 2 | "And the Winner Is..." | Andrew D. Weyman | Robert Cohen | October 18, 2000 | 12.86 |
When Bette forgets to thank her husband Roy (Kevin Dunn) in an award acceptance speech for a guest role as a commanding officer on JAG, she goes out of her way to win another award. Her manager Connie (Joanna Gleason) sets her up for an AFI Award, however it is not the American Film Institute, as she thinks, but rather the Airline Food Industry awards. George Segal and Sharon Lawrence guest star as themselves at the ceremony. David James Elliott guest stars as his JAG character. Marina Malota joins the cast as Rose.
| 3 | "Halloween" | Andrew D. Weyman | Meg DeLoatch | October 25, 2000 | 12.07 |
Bette stirs up trouble for Dolly Parton when the pair tape a TV special on Halloween.
| 4 | "Silent But Deadly" | Andrew D. Weyman | David Feeney, Jeffrey Lane | November 1, 2000 | 10.70 |
Roy warns Bette that she's pushing herself too hard, but she persists, losing her voice and having to mime her way through her day, including during sessions with her insightful therapist (Suzie Plakson).
| 5 | "Two Days at a Time" | Andrew D. Weyman | Boyd Hale | November 8, 2000 | 11.39 |
When Bette is invited on Oprah to partake in the book club, she finds herself multi-tasking... but never finds time to actually read the book.
| 6 | "Color of Roses" | Andrew D. Weyman | Janis Hirsch | November 15, 2000 | 8.42 |
Bette agrees to let her musical director Oscar (James Dreyfus) produce the song he's written for her. As the recording day unfolds, Bette can't seem to stay focused, instead planning an array of different musical approaches that take her ever further from Oscar's vision. Meanwhile, visiting the studio, Roy unknowingly eats some "special" brownies from some Rastafari musicians; Rose's friend Herbie (Marco Gould) attempts to push the music in a Latino direction; and Connie bonds with the band NSYNC who are recording down the hall.
| 7 | "In My Life" | Andrew D. Weyman | Josh Bycel, Jonathan Fener & Jeffrey Lane | November 22, 2000 | 7.60 |
Through a series of flashbacks, it's revealed how Bette met all of the closest people in her life: Connie, on an ill-fated nightclub excursion during the late '70s; Roy, in the coach section of a plane in the early '80s; Oscar, as he applied for a job on the day Bette and Roy moved into their current home; and Rose's birth.
| 8 | "I Love This Game" | Andrew D. Weyman | Jonathan Fener & Josh Bycel | November 29, 2000 | 8.32 |
When Bette needs a last-minute birthday present for Roy, she promises him court side tickets to a Lakers game. However her attempts to find the tickets go awry, leading her to battle with an usher (Fred Stoller) she once embarrassed in front of a crowded theater, and seeking to befriend Kobe Bryant in an attempt to salvage the situation.
| 9 | "...Or Not to Be" | Andrew D. Weyman | Jeffrey Lane | December 13, 2000 | 8.17 |
Feeling unintelligent in front of Roy's professor friends, she weasels her way into a stage production of Hamlet starring Tim Curry. However the two actors' styles don't mesh, to say the least, and the situation isn't helped by Oscar's own past rivalry with Curry.
| 10 | "Diva, Interrupted" | Andrew D. Weyman | Gary Janetti | December 20, 2000 | 6.83 |
Struggling to keep up her popularity with the public, Bette hires a publicist (Christine Dunford) who convinces her to stage a mental breakdown. However through a series of mishaps, her performance becomes a little too real to the public. Marina Malota (Rose) does not appear.
| 11 | "True Story" | Andrew D. Weyman | Story by : Cody Farley, Gary Janetti and Suzanne Myers; Teleplay by : Gary Janetti | January 3, 2001 | 9.45 |
Stuck without a story to tell during an appearance on The View (talk show), Bette accidentally gives the impression she saved a boy from drowning at the beach. When Meredith Vieira asks her to bring the boy on the show so they can donate to charity, she finds the lie getting out of control - especially once she hires a child actor who turns the situation to his advantage. Meanwhile, Oscar goes to great lengths to impress a lifeguard to whom he is attracted. This is the last episode for Kevin Dunn as Roy.
| 12 | "Of Men and Meatballs" | Andrew D. Weyman | Boyd Hale & Janis Hirsch | January 10, 2001 | 7.93 |
While filming an episode of Family Law with Tony Danza, Bette realizes that Connie is tired of being single. Bette takes Connie out to find her a man, but the only men they find are weirdos. Meanwhile Oscar determines to spend some quality time with Rose. Kevin Dunn is credited for this episode, but does not appear. His name is removed from the credits starting with the following episode.
| 13 | "Big Business" | Andrew D. Weyman | Janis Hirsch | January 24, 2001 | 6.93 |
When her latest movie premiere is delayed, Bette decides to assist Rose with a school project. With the aid of a vivacious designer (John Michael Higgins), the pair design an unusual line of jumpsuits. They then have to tape a 6-hour live segment for a home shopping network - with a skeptical host (Fred Willard) - to sell 4,000 of the items.
| 14 | "The Invisible Mom" | Andrew D. Weyman | David Feeney | February 7, 2001 | 6.24 |
While volunteering at Rose's school, Bette attempts to match her daughter with an eager young student (Samm Levine), avoid the principal (Christian Clemenson), who has written a screenplay for her, and finally learns why fellow volunteer Olivia Newton-John has been holding a grudge against her since the 1970s. Meanwhile Connie spends the day doling out advice in the girls bathroom and reliving her anguished youth.
| 15 | "Polterguest" | Andrew D. Weyman | Robert Cohen | February 28, 2001 | 7.11 |
Bette's new neighbor, Jon Lovitz, is having his house remodeled, and invites himself to stay. However his personality and excessive demands rankle Bette, Rose, Oscar, and Connie, until they discover his real motivation.
| 16 | "A Brand New Roy" | Andrew D. Weyman | Meg DeLoatch | March 7, 2001 | 5.83 |
Roy and Bette's attempt at a romantic evening alone is ruined by Connie, Oscar, and Rose. As a result, Roy surprises Bette with a last-minute trip to Paris but their plans fall apart at the airport, as the determined staff (Gary Janetti, Amy Hill) and fellow passengers make things difficult. Robert Hays joins the cast as Roy. This was the final episode which aired on CBS, as the network cancelled the program the same day.
| 17 | "The Grammy Pre-Show" | Andrew D. Weyman | Jeffrey Lane | Unaired | N/A |
Bette is invited to sing at the Grammy Awards (although she would rather be nominated). As she prepares for the evening, things fall apart when Connie loses an expensive earring loaned to Bette for the night by Harry Winston, Inc. The situation falls apart further with Rose's preparations for the evening, a fiery fashion designer (Jenifer Lewis), and the unexpected arrival of Oscar's grandma (Helena Carroll) and her friend, who has high expectations of celebrity homes. This episode was filmed prior to A Brand New Roy, and thus does not feature the character of Roy. This episode was originally scheduled to air on February 21, 2001, the same night as the 2001 Grammy Awards but was pulled as the program was experiencing low ratings. It aired only in HDTV simulcasting and in foreign markets.
| 18 | "A Method to Her Madness" | Andrew D. Weyman | Jimmy Aleck & Jim Keily | Unaired | N/A |
To research a role in a new film, Bette becomes the character and takes a job waiting tables in a diner. This was the final episode to be filmed, as CBS cancelled the program before it completed its 22-episode order. It ultimately aired only in HDTV simulcasting and in foreign markets.

== Broadcast ==
=== United States ===
16 of the 18 filmed episodes aired Wednesday nights until its cancellation. Originally in the 8pm time slot, Bette was moved to 8:30/7:30c in February 2001 and aired only a few more times. Two episodes went unaired on network TV, but aired in HDTV in which it was simulcast.

=== International ===
In Australia, Bette was shown on Network Ten in prime-time on Sunday nights beginning in January 2001. Bette aired in Canada on OUT-TV on Saturday Nights in 2020. All 18 episodes aired during this run. As of April 2022, the entire series is streaming in Canada on CTV.

== Ratings ==
| Season | TV Season | Rank | Viewers (in millions) |
|---|---|---|---|
| 1 | 2000–01 | #79 | 8.8 |

== Awards ==
- Golden Globe (2001) – Nominated – "Best Performance by an Actress in a TV-Series – Comedy/Musical" – Bette Midler
- People's Choice Awards (2001) – Won – "Favorite Female Performer in a New Television Series" – Bette Midler
- TV Guide Awards (2001) – Won – "Actress of the Year in a New Series" – Bette Midler
- TV Guide Awards (2001) – Nominated – "New Series of the Year"
- Primetime Emmy Award (2001) – Nominated – "Outstanding Art Direction for a Multi-Camera Series" – Bernard Vyzga (production designer) & Lynda Burbank (set decorator) for the pilot
- Excellence in Production Design Award Television – Won – "Episode of a Multi-Camera Series" – Bernard Vyzga (production designer) & Rich Rohrer (assistant art director) for the pilot
