= Zazarac =

American cocktail

Zazarack (1910)
- Type: Cocktail
- Ingredients: 100% bourbon whiskey base: 1 dash absinthe; 1 dash angostura bitters; sugar (quarter loaf)
- Standard drinkware: Old fashioned glass
- Standard garnish: no
- Served: Straight up: chilled, without ice
- Preparation: Stir all ingredients with a piece of broken ice. Strain into chilled old fashioned glass.

Zazarac (1928)
- Type: Cocktail
- Ingredients: 1/6 rum; 1/6 anisette; 1/6 gomme syrup; 1/3 rye whiskey; 1 dash angostura bitters; 1 dash orange bitters; 3 dashes absinthe
- Standard drinkware: Old fashioned glass
- Standard garnish: lemon peel
- Served: Straight up: chilled, without ice
- Preparation: Pour all ingredients into a cocktail shaker with ice and shake well. Strain into cocktail glass.

The Zazarack cocktail, later spelled Zazarac, is an American cocktail which may be related to the Sazerac, although it might have originated completely independent of the more famous drink.

The Zazarack was included in the 1910 version of Jack's Manual, an early cocktail guide written by Jacob "Jack" Grohusko who was the head bartender at Baracca's restaurant in New York. It called for 100% bourbon whiskey, 1 dash of absinthe, 1 dash of angostura, and a quarter loaf of sugar. Directions included stirring with ice and straining into an old fashioned glass that had been placed in ice for three minutes.

Later versions changed the spelling, varied the specified whiskey, and added the use of rum. This version was included in the famous mixologist, Harry Craddock's book of drinks, The Savoy Cocktail Book, and was highlighted in the Forbes Magazine's article about the 2007 reprint of the notable bar recipe book. It's also listed in such other notable mixology books such as Harry MacElhone's Harry's ABC of Mixing Cocktails, published in 1928. It is made with gomme syrup which has a much higher concentration of sugar than simple syrup, which some modern variations of the recipes replace it with; the addition of several types of bitters makes this a spicy drink.
