= Pendennis Club (cocktail) =

Classic cocktail with gin, apricot brandy, and lime juice

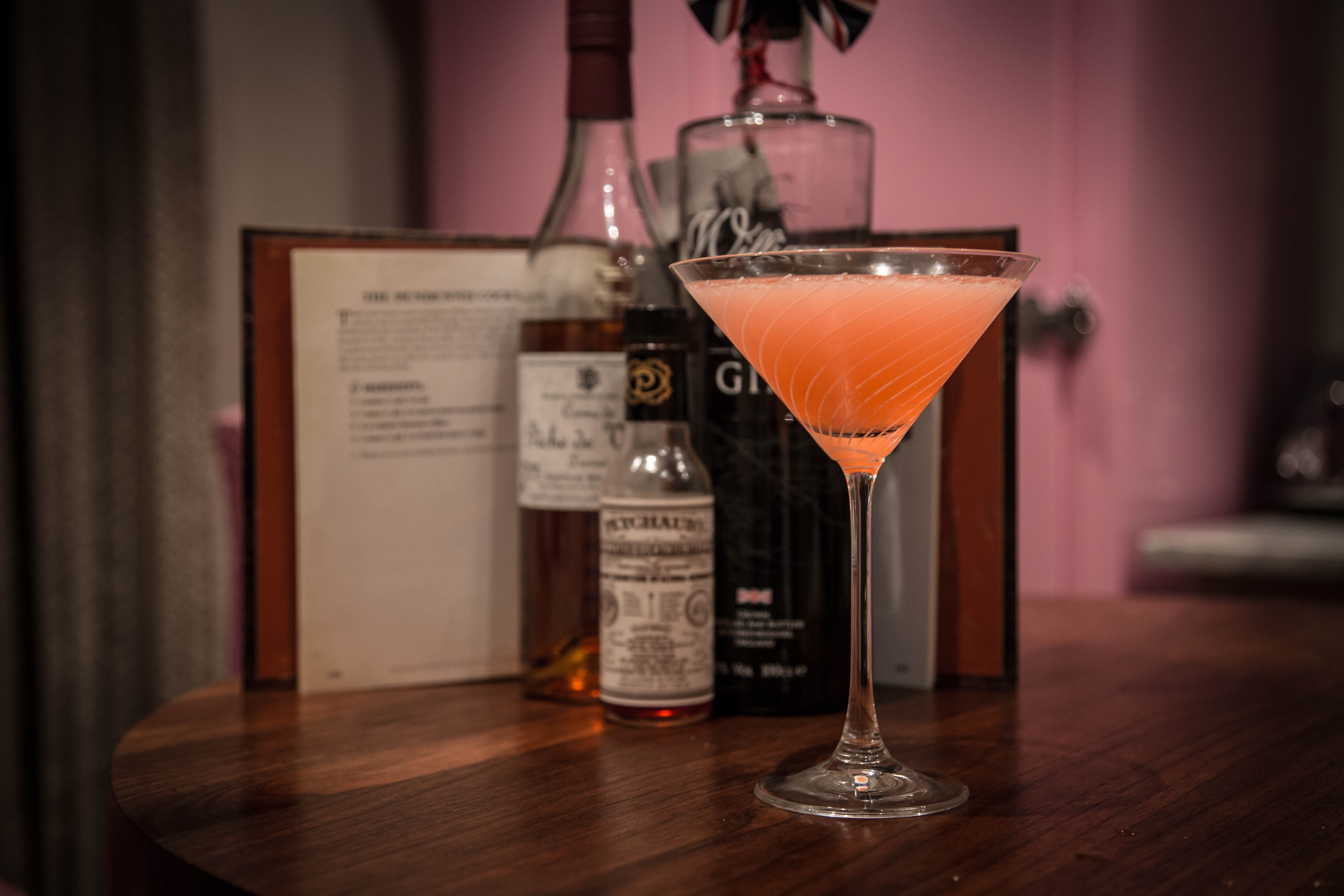
- Type: Mixed drink
- Ingredients: 60 ml dry gin; 30 ml apricot brandy; 20 ml lime juice; 2 dashes Peychaud's bitters
- Standard drinkware: Cocktail glass
- Standard garnish: optionally a split kumquat
- Served: Straight up: chilled, without ice
- Preparation: Pour all ingredients into mixing tin with ice cubes. Shake well. Strain into a chilled cocktail glass, optional over a split kumquat.

The Pendennis Club cocktail (or Pendennis cocktail) is a cocktail created at the private club of the same name, the Pendennis Club of Louisville, Kentucky, in or shortly before 1911. It experienced a minor revival in the 2010s, but as of 2024 it remains uncommon.

The original cocktail (1911) is made of gin and apricot brandy in a 2:1 ratio, plus lime juice. Later versions (1939) add Peychaud's bitters, which is generally retained in later recipes, and a kumquat, which is sometimes optionally used. Modern versions vary the apricot ingredient, splitting apricot eau-de-vie with apricot liqueur or added sugar, both due to lack of availability of "apricot brandy" and to balance the tartness and sweetness. This makes it a kind of fancy gin sour ("fancy" because the sweetener is not simply sugar). The combination of apricot and lime tastes similar to grapefruit, though grapefruit is not used in the cocktail.

There is also a version with dry vermouth instead of lime juice, but this appears to be a confusion with another cocktail; see § History.

== History ==
The cocktail presumably dates to circa 1910, more narrowly 1910 or 1911, and may be credited to Louis Herring, the manager of the Pendennis Club at the time, or to an unknown bartender at the club. This precise dating is possible because the cocktail is first recorded shortly after the manager of the club changed, and the cocktail does not appear in a comprehensive book published shortly after by the former manager, Straub (1913), which did feature other cocktails from the club.

The recipe first appears in print in Washburne & Bronner (1911) as:

PENDENNIS COCKTAIL
Fill mixing glass with shaved ice.
Juice of one-half lime.
One-third jigger Hungarian Apricotine.
One jigger Dry Gin.
Stir and strain in cocktail glass.

This book was published in Louisville and included representative recipes from bars, and the club's page bears the signature of Louis Herring, providing as great authority as may be asked for contemporary sources.

A recipe by this name appears in Boothby (1912), (Note: The recipe does not appear in the original printing of the 1908 edition, with "1908" on the cover, but appears in the 1912 reprinting, with "Latest Edition" on the cover, in the supplemental section "Some New-Up-To-Now Seductive American Cocktails". See also discussion at Zimmermann (2019).) where it is given as:

PENDENNIS CLUB COCKTAIL.
(LOUISVILLE, KY.)
One-quarter Apricot brandy, one-quarter French Vermont, one-half Coates Plymouth gin; shake well and serve very cold.

This appears to be a confusion, and is more similar in ingredients (though not proportions) with the "Van Zandt Cocktail" (Note: dash apricot brandy, ½ jigger French vermouth, ½ jigger dry gin) in Straub (1913).

The version given in Charles Baker's The Gentleman's Companion (1939) is:

THE PENDENNIS CLUB'S FAMOUS SPECIAL
To 1 jigger of dry gin add ½ jigger of the best dry apricot brandy procurable. Squeeze in the juice of 1 lime or ½ a small lemon, strained of course, and trim with 2 dashes of Peychaud's bitters which has been made for generations in New Orleans. ... Split a ripe kumquat, now available during the winter in most big grocery or fruit stores; take out the seeds and put the two halves in a Manhattan glass. Stir the drink like a Martini with lots of cracked ice and strain onto the golden fruit. This is a sweeter Grande Bretagne, see Page 47.

The cocktail continued to be included in cocktail books over the following decades, and was included in Haigh (2009) as part of the cocktail renaissance, with the recipe given as:

2 ounces (6 cl) gin
1 ounce (3 cl) apricot (some say peach) brandy
2 or 3 dashes Peychaud's Bitters
¾ ounce (2 cl) fresh lime juice
Shake in an iced cocktail shaker, and strain into a cocktail glass.

It was subsequently included in the Death & Co. book, and also popularized by Toby Cecchini.

The cocktail was not continuously served at the Pendennis Club from its creation to the present, but was revived in 2014, following the recipe in Baker.

== Similar cocktails ==
Other cocktails that feature gin and apricot brandy in a 2:1 ratio include the Barnum (Was Right), the Paradise, and the Spencer. More broadly, it is similar to the sidecar or sour families, combining spirit, a liqueur sweetener, and citrus juice.

A Juniper Club cocktail also exists, from the Juniper Club at Silver Glen Springs, founded by members of the Pendennis Club, and consisting of gin, Cointreau, lemon or lime juice, and Peychaud's bitters. This can be interpreted as a white lady with Peychaud's bitters, or as a Pendennis Club cocktail with Cointreau instead of apricot brandy.
