= Sazerac =

Cognac or whiskey cocktail

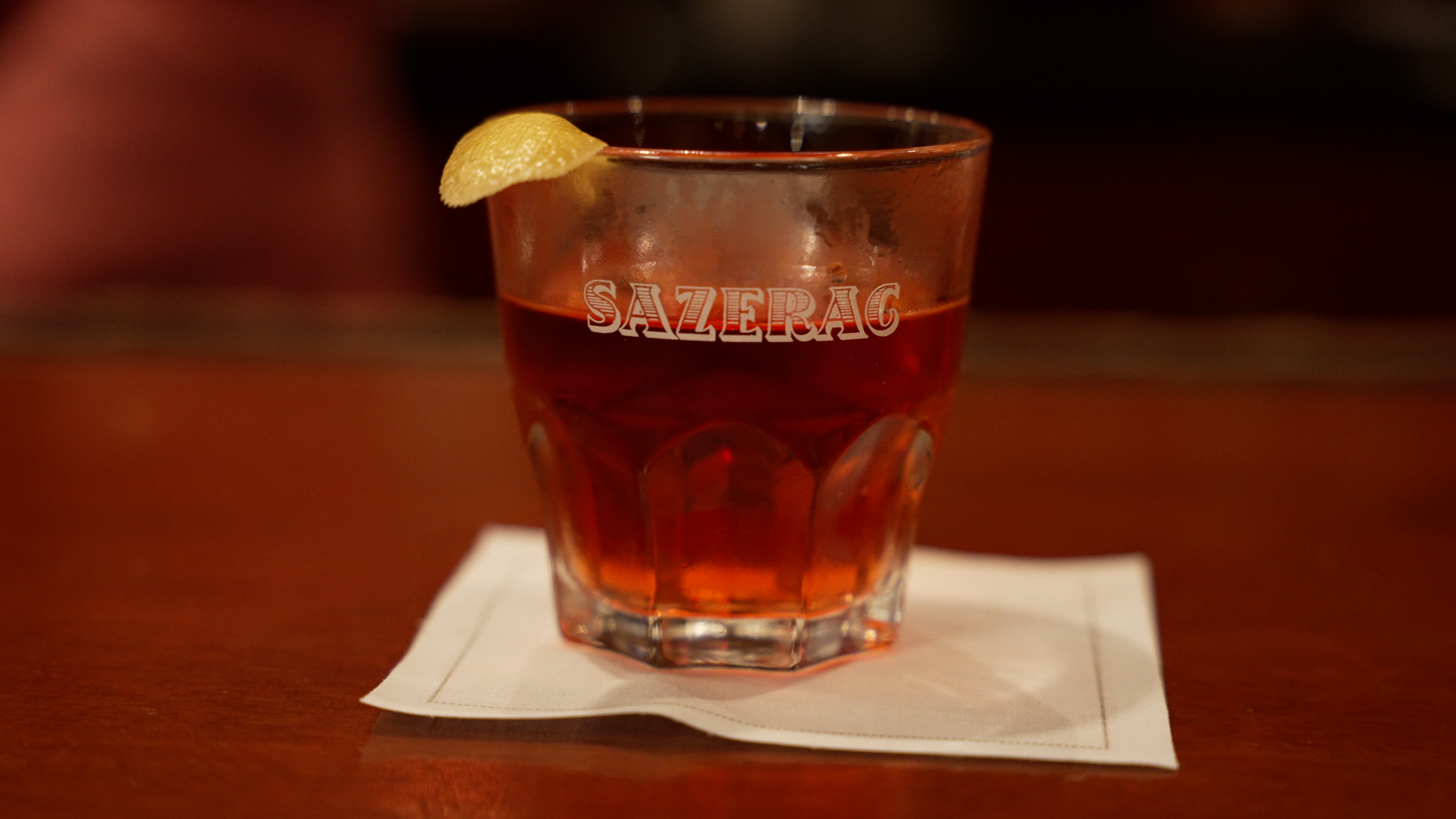
- A Sazerac cocktail at the Sazerac Bar, New Orleans, 2024
- Type: Cocktail
- Ingredients: 50 ml cognac; 10 ml absinthe; One sugar cube; Two dashes Peychaud's Bitters
- Base spirit: Cognac
- Standard drinkware: Old fashioned glass
- Standard garnish: lemon zest
- Served: Straight up: chilled, without ice
- Preparation: Rinse a chilled old-fashioned glass with absinthe or anisette, and add crushed ice. Stir the other ingredients, with ice in a different glass. Discard ice and excess absinthe from the first glass, and strain the mixture into that glass.

Sazerac is a local variation of a cognac or whiskey cocktail originally from New Orleans. It is named for the Sazerac de Forge et Fils brand of cognac brandy that originally served as its main ingredient. The drink is most traditionally a combination of cognac or rye whiskey, absinthe, Peychaud's Bitters, and sugar, although bourbon whiskey is sometimes substituted for the rye and Herbsaint is sometimes substituted for the absinthe. Some claim it is the oldest known American cocktail, with origins in antebellum New Orleans, although drink historian David Wondrich is among those who dispute this, and American instances of published usage of the word cocktail to describe a mixture of spirits, bitters, and sugar can be traced to the early 19th century.

== Characteristics ==
The defining feature of the Sazerac is its method of preparation, which commonly involves two chilled old-fashioned glasses. The first glass is swirled with a wash of absinthe for its flavor and strong scent. The second glass is used to combine the remaining ingredients, which are stirred with ice, then strained into the first glass. Various anisettes such as pastis, Pernod, or Herbsaint are common substitutes when absinthe is unavailable. In New Orleans, Herbsaint is most commonly used due to the absence of absinthe in the U.S. market from 1912 until 2007.

"New Orleans style" uses 100% whiskey, while "New York–style Sazerac" or "New York Sazerac" is typified by a split base of rye whiskey and brandy in equal proportion and is the standard version in Australia.

== History ==
Around 1850, Sewell T. Taylor sold his New Orleans bar, the Merchants Exchange Coffee House, to become an importer of spirits, and he began to import a brand of cognac named Sazerac-de-Forge et Fils. Meanwhile, Aaron Bird assumed proprietorship of the Merchants Exchange and changed its name to Sazerac Coffee House.

Bird began serving the "Sazerac Cocktail", made with Sazerac cognac imported by Taylor, and allegedly with bitters being made by the local apothecary, Antoine Amedie Peychaud. The Sazerac Coffee House was sold several times, until around 1870 Thomas Handy became its proprietor. It is around this time that the primary ingredient changed from cognac to rye whiskey, due to the Great French Wine Blight.

At some point before his death in 1889, Handy recorded the recipe for Sazerac, which made its first printed appearance in William T. "Cocktail Bill" Boothby's The World's Drinks and How to Mix Them (1908), although his recipe calls for Selner Bitters, not Peychaud's. After absinthe was banned in the United States in 1912, it was replaced by various anise-flavored liqueurs, the most notable product being locally produced Herbsaint, which first appeared in 1934.

By the early 20th century, simple cocktails like the Sazerac had become rare, which eventually rekindled their popularity.

The creation of the Sazerac has also been credited to Antoine Amédée Peychaud, a Creole apothecary who emigrated to New Orleans from the West Indies and set up shop in the French Quarter in the early 19th century. He was known to dispense a proprietary mix of aromatic bitters from an old family recipe. According to popular myth, he served his drink in the large end of an egg cup that was called a coquetier in French, and the Americanized mispronunciation resulted in the name cocktail. This belief was debunked when people discovered that the term "cocktail" as a type of drink first appeared in print at least as far back as 1803—and was defined in print in 1806 as, "a mixture of spirits of any kind, water, sugar and bitters, vulgarly called a bittered sling".

=== Official cocktail of New Orleans ===
In March 2008, Louisiana state senator Edwin R. Murray (D-New Orleans) filed Senate Bill 6 designating the Sazerac as Louisiana's official state cocktail. The bill was defeated on April 8, 2008. After further debate, on June 23, 2008, the Louisiana Legislature agreed to proclaim the Sazerac as New Orleans' official cocktail.

In 2011, as a writer for the HBO TV series Treme, Anthony Bourdain penned a scene in which chef Janette Desautel (played by Kim Dickens) tosses one in the face of restaurant critic and food writer Alan Richman (appearing as himself). Richman had angered many New Orleanians in 2006 with an article in GQ in which he criticized New Orleans' food culture after Hurricane Katrina. Despite reservations, he agreed to participate in the scene and called Sazerac "a good choice of weaponry, because it symbolizes the city", despite a running feud with Bourdain over, among other things, the review.

== Similar cocktails ==
A cocktail named the Zazarac was included in the 1910 version of Jack's Manual, an early bartender's reference written by Jacob "Jack" Grohusko, the head bartender at Baracca's restaurant in New York. It is essentially the same cocktail as the Sazerac, but called for bourbon (and not rye) instead of cognac.

Later versions of the drink were spelled Zazarac and added rum, and are thought by some to be a variant of the Sazerac, although it might have originated completely independently of the more famous drink.

== Brands ==
Sazerac is also a brand of rye whiskey produced by the Sazerac Company.

== See also ==
- List of cocktails
- Old Fashioned
