= Callie Khouri =

American screenwriter, producer, and director (born 1957)

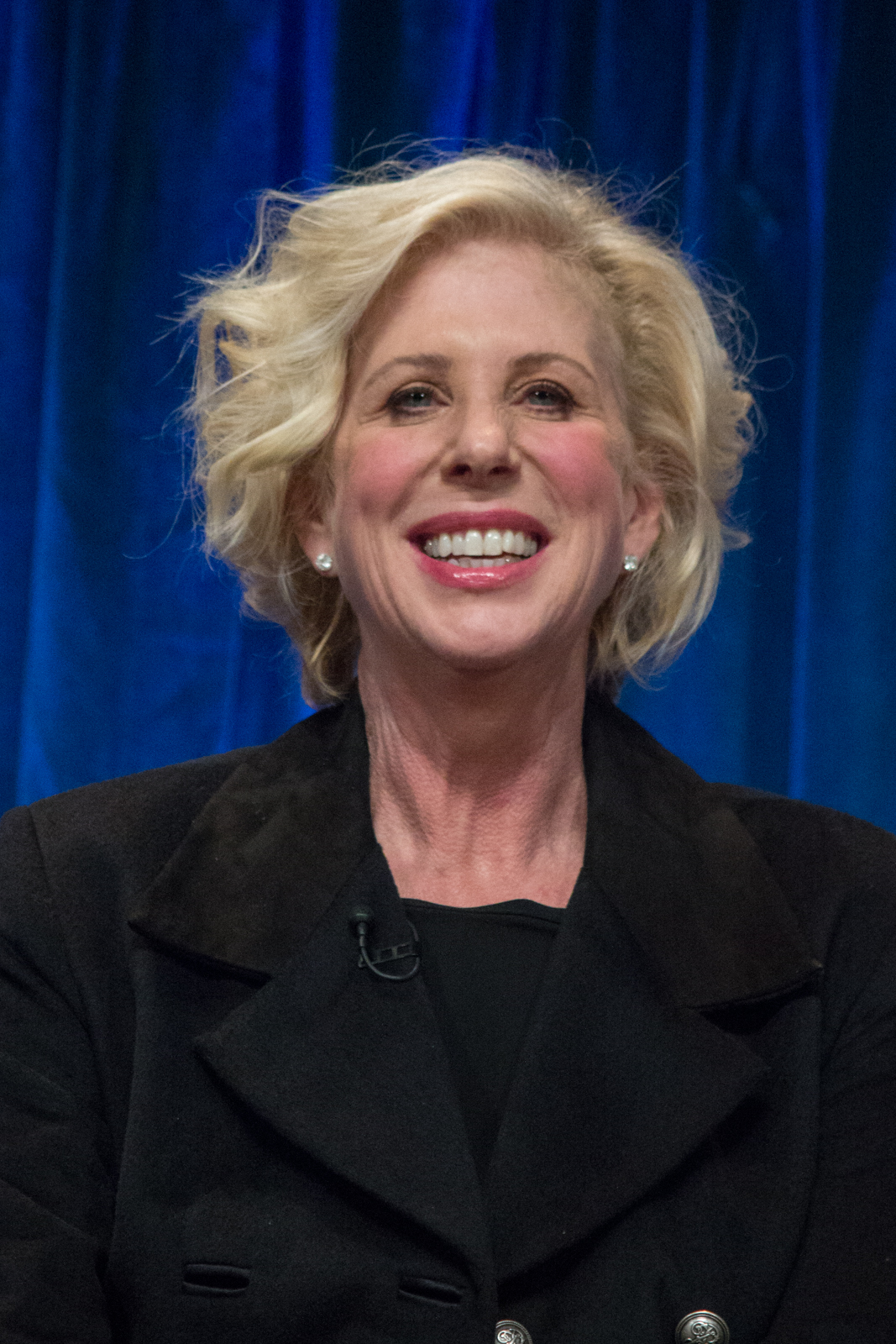
- Born: Carolyn Ann Khouri; November 27, 1957 (age 68); San Antonio, Texas, U.S.
- Occupations: Film/television writer, director, producer, feminist speaker
- Spouse(s): David W. Warfield (m. 1990, divorced) T Bone Burnett (m. 2006)

Carolyn Ann "Callie" Khouri (born November 27, 1957) is an American film and television screenwriter, producer and director. She is best known for writing Thelma & Louise, which won the Academy Award for Best Original Screenplay. Thelma & Louise has since grown to be considered a classic, and was inducted into the Library of Congress National Film Registry in December 2016.

Khouri's other films include Mad Money (2008) and the Aretha Franklin biopic Respect (2021). She also created the series Nashville, which premiered on ABC in 2012 to strong reviews and ran for six seasons.

== Early and personal life ==
Callie Khouri was born in San Antonio, Texas but was brought up in Kentucky. She is the daughter of a Lebanese-American Maronite father; her family name Khouri means "priest" in Levantine Arabic. Khouri's interest in theater arts began when she took part in high school plays. Following her graduation from St Mary High School in Paducah, Kentucky, she studied landscape architecture at Purdue University before changing her major to drama. Khouri dropped out of Purdue and moved to Los Angeles, where she waited tables and studied at the Lee Strasberg Theatre and Film Institute and with acting teacher Peggy Feury. She soon realized that being an actress was not her destiny: "I can't stand people looking at me," said Khouri.

In 1985, she took her first step toward "film production by pursuing a position as a commercial and music video production assistant." From 1996 to 1998, and from 2000 to 2002, Khouri served on the Writers Guild of America board of directors; she sat on the board of trustees of the Writer's Guild Foundation from 2001 to 2004. She was a member of Hollywood Women's Political Committee, Fairness and Accuracy in Reporting Women's Media Watch Project.

On June 2, 1990, she married David Weaver Warfield, a writer and a producer. She later divorced him, and married musician T Bone Burnett in 2006.

== Career ==
Khouri is a screenwriter, director, producer, lecturer, and non-fiction author. She also worked as an actress, lecturer, and waiter in Nashville. While working for a company that made commercials and music videos, she began writing Thelma & Louise, her first produced screenplay. Thelma & Louise won Khouri the Academy Award for Best Original Screenplay, a Golden Globe Award, and a PEN Literary Award, as well as the London Film Critics Circle Award for Film of the Year and a nomination for Best Original Screenplay from the British Academy of Film and Television Arts.

Khouri described her experience filming Thelma & Louise in an interview by David Konow, a scholarly author and journalist: "While I was writing Thelma and Louise, it was the most fun I had ever had in my life, bar none," she says. "It was such a pure experience. There was no self-censorship there, there was no second guessing. From a creative standpoint, it was the freest I had ever been in my life. I loved every moment I got to spend time with those characters. Nothing came close to it, including winning all the awards and everything else. As much fun as all that was, it wasn't as much fun as sitting alone in a crummy office on Vine at 2 in the morning writing that screenplay."

At the Oscar ceremony she said, "for everyone who wanted to see a happy ending for Thelma and Louise, for me this is it," brandishing the statue high. After winning the Academy Award, she felt motivated enough to continue on with her career and express "her feelings about the lack of female directors in Hollywood", not to mention that most of her career began because of her stance on women's rights. In an interview with The Huffington Post, she stated that adult women "are a market that I feel is underserved in the entertainment population at large. I don't see the kind of women represented that I know or that I'm attracted to. I really want to try to write more nuanced, less simplistic kind of stuff, and it's hard to find a place to do that."

=== Thelma and Louise ===
"At first I had no desire to write screenplays. I kind of wished I had because I was reaching the end of my time producing music videos. I was struggling so hard to figure out what it was that I was supposed to be doing. I kept thinking I'm supposed to be doing something creative. I can't believe I have such a knack for the vernacular and I don't have anywhere to apply it." "I felt I had not found my true path. And then a series of events occurred that led me to the point where I didn't have anything to lose if I wrote a screenplay." She began writing sitcoms with a comedian friend but was plagued by second thoughts about her work. Khouri was frustrated and kept "contemplating and meditating" until she got this idea of "two women going on a crime spree." She felt as if a light bulb had gone on over her head, making her more interested in the idea.

She originally created the character Louise as a woman living in Texas who works as a communication secretary, "somebody sitting behind one of those big desks with a headset on directing people and taking calls and all that stuff." She imagined that Louise considered herself a liability as an employee, and that women would never be able to achieve power. This version of Louise would always remain narrow in her ambitions, someone "who never realized women could be executives until she saw one come in the front door."

The character Thelma, on the other hand, was first written as a character who "had kids and stuff like that, but I realized that she couldn't have kids. The idea that Darryl wanted her to wait, because the kids would be a sacrifice for him financially, fit perfectly. And, of course, she's really a child herself. I had to set it up that way. I love to laugh, and I wanted this to be a movie you were enjoying and having a good time with because you were watching these women get their lives. Even though they would lose them, they were becoming more and more themselves. It was a beautiful experience, a liberating experience to watch that."

=== Subsequent work ===
Her second film as a writer, the romantic comedy-drama Something to Talk About (1995), earned mixed reviews from critics.

In June 2002, Khouri made her directorial debut with her adaptation of Divine Secrets of the Ya-Ya Sisterhood, which grossed a total of $73,839,240 worldwide. The film opened at number two in the box office behind The Sum of All Fears's second weekend.

In 2006, Khouri created, wrote and directed the pilot for the legal television series Hollis & Rae that was produced by Steven Bochco.

Khouri directed Mad Money in 2008, a crime-caper film starring Diane Keaton, Queen Latifah, and Katie Holmes.

In 2012 she developed ABC's country music drama series, Nashville, starring Connie Britton and Hayden Panettiere. Khouri's husband T Bone Burnett was the show's executive music producer and composer for the first season. Leaving the show shortly after the first season production wrapped, Burnett later stated that he was upset with television executives' treatment of his wife. His assistant and the managing producer Buddy Miller took over for Burnett in season two. Nashville received positive reviews from critics, and Khouri continued on the show without Burnett's involvement. In 2016, Nashville moved to CMT.

In 2026, a musical based on Thelma & Louise debuted at the Young Vic Theatre in London.. Khouri returned to write the book, with music by Neko Case.

== Teaching ==
Khouri works as a part-time lecturer of theatre arts. She has taught a master class on film-making at the Athena Film Festival at Barnard College in New York City, as well as a writing and directing course at the Arts Initiative Columbia University in New York, featuring Thelma & Louise.

== Advocacy ==
=== Gun control ===
According to an interview in Variety Khouri takes an opposing approach toward guns in social media: "in other countries where they have violent video games but less access to guns, they have less mass shootings. I have a really hard time saying, if there were no violent games, people would stop shooting each other. I think that until they have no way of shooting each other, they won't stop." says Khouri. "We have a speed limit. Why can't we have a bullet limit? The idea that we don't need limits stricter than we have now on guns is absolutely insane. Because ultimately, people don't kill people – guns kill people, and people with guns kill people." She also argued that America has lost its moral compass and that "it's worse than it's ever been!" in the matters of gun control. She claimed that there is no quick route to end gun violence because Hollywood actors such as Sylvester Stallone "make a fortune from violence. Do you think those types of movies will stop getting made? I don't," says Khouri.

=== National Women's History Museum ===
The National Women's History Museum (NWHM) is a non-profit organization that recognizes powerful women who contribute toward feminist filmmaking, such as Callie Khouri and Susan Sarandon. It also receives support, as well as generous donations, from other women such as Shonda Rhimes, Meryl Streep, and Frances Fisher. On August 23, 2014, Callie Khouri was honored by the National Women's History Museum and NWHM Los Angeles Council in "Women Making History Brunch" at the Skirball Cultural Center in Los Angeles, California, for winning an Academy Award, Golden Globe, and WGA. "She's revolutionary," said Geena Davis on working with Khouri, who also is the creator and executive producer of Nashville." "She creates characters that are in charge of their own fate to the bitter end. Female characters who are in charge of themselves."

== Filmography ==
Film

Year	Title	Director	Writer	Ref.
1991	Thelma & Louise (Note: Also credited as co-producer)	No	Yes	
1995	Something to Talk About	No	Yes	
2002	Divine Secrets of the Ya-Ya Sisterhood	Yes	Yes	
2008	Mad Money	Yes	No	
2021	Respect	No	Story	

TV movies

Year	Title	Director	Executive producer	Writer	Ref.
2006	Hollis & Rae	Yes	Yes	Yes	
2019	Patsy & Loretta	Yes	Yes	No	

TV series

Year	Title	Director	Writer	Executive producer	Creator	Notes	Ref.
2012–2018	Nashville	Yes	Yes	Yes	Yes	Directed 17 episodes, wrote 8 episodes	

== Awards and nominations ==
List of awards and nominations
Year	Award	Category	Film	Result	Notes
1992	New York Film Critics Circle Award	Best Screenplay	Thelma & Louise	Won	
1992	PEN Center USA West Literary Award	Best Screenplay	Thelma & Louise	Won	
1992	Chicago Film Critics Association Award	Best Screenplay	Thelma & Louise	Nominated	
1992	Writers Guild of America	Best Original Screenplay	Thelma & Louise	Won	
1992	Golden Globe Award	Best Screenplay	Thelma & Louise	Won	
1992	BAFTA Award	Best Original Screenplay	Thelma & Louise	Nominated	
1992	Academy Award	Best Original Screenplay	Thelma & Louise	Won	
2012	Satellite Award	Best Television Series – Drama	Nashville	Nominated	
2012	People's Choice Awards	Favorite New TV Drama	Nashville	Nominated	
2012	Writers Guild of America Award	Best Screenplay – New Series	Nashville	Nominated	
2013	People's Choice Awards	Favorite Network TV Drama	Nashville	Nominated	
2013	Austin Film Festival	Distinguished Screenwriter Award		Won	
