= Jeffrey Lane =

American author, scriptwriter and producer (1954–2026)

- Born: Jeffrey Scott Lane; August 10, 1954; St. Louis, Missouri, U.S.
- Died: May 20, 2026 (aged 71); New York, U.S.
- Occupations: Author, television scriptwriter, film producer, actor

Jeffrey Scott Lane (August 10, 1954 – May 20, 2026) was an American author, television scriptwriter, film producer and actor. He was a graduate of Wesleyan University.

== Career ==
=== Broadway ===
Lane wrote the book for the musical Dirty Rotten Scoundrels, which ran on Broadway in 2005 and was nominated for the Tony Award for Best Musical. He wrote the book for the musical adaptation Women on the Verge of a Nervous Breakdown, which was nominated for three Tony Awards and numerous Drama Desk Awards. Laura Benanti won the Drama Desk Award for Outstanding Actress in a Musical.

=== Television ===
Lane wrote and produced for many television series and shows, including Mad About You, Ryan's Hope, Lou Grant, and The Days and Nights of Molly Dodd. He initially came up with the concept of Ink, but he was replaced by Diane English at the last minute.

Writer

- Lou Grant (1977) TV Series
- Ryan's Hope (hired by Claire Labine)
- Cagney & Lacey (1982) TV Series
- The Mississippi (1983) TV Series
- Partners in Crime (1984) TV Series... a.k.a. 50/50 (Europe)
- The American Film Institute Salute to Gene Kelly (1985) (TV) ... a.k.a. The Best of Gene Kelly (UK: video box title)
- The Days and Nights of Molly Dodd (1987) TV Series
- The Murder of Mary Phagan (1988) (TV)
- Sunday Times
- Same Time Next Week
- Mad About You
- Bette
- Loco por ti

Producer

- The American Film Institute Salute to Gregory Peck (1989) (TV) (co-producer)
- Mad About You (1992) TV Series (executive producer)
- Bette (2000) TV Series (executive producer)

Miscellaneous

- Ryan's Hope (1975) TV Series (production assistant)
- The American Film Institute Salute to Gene Kelly (1985) (TV) (production associate) ... a.k.a. The Best of Gene Kelly (UK: video box title)

Actor

- Forever Evil (1987) .... Jay

== Death ==
Lane died following a long illness in New York on May 20, 2026, at the age of 71.

== Awards ==
- The AFI Lifetime Achievement Award
- 2005 Tony Award for Best Book of a Musical, Dirty Rotten Scoundrels (nominee)
- Five Emmy Awards
- Three Writers Guild of America Awards
- Two Peabodys
- Golden Globe
- The Christopher Award
