= Peychaud's Bitters =

Gentian-based bitters

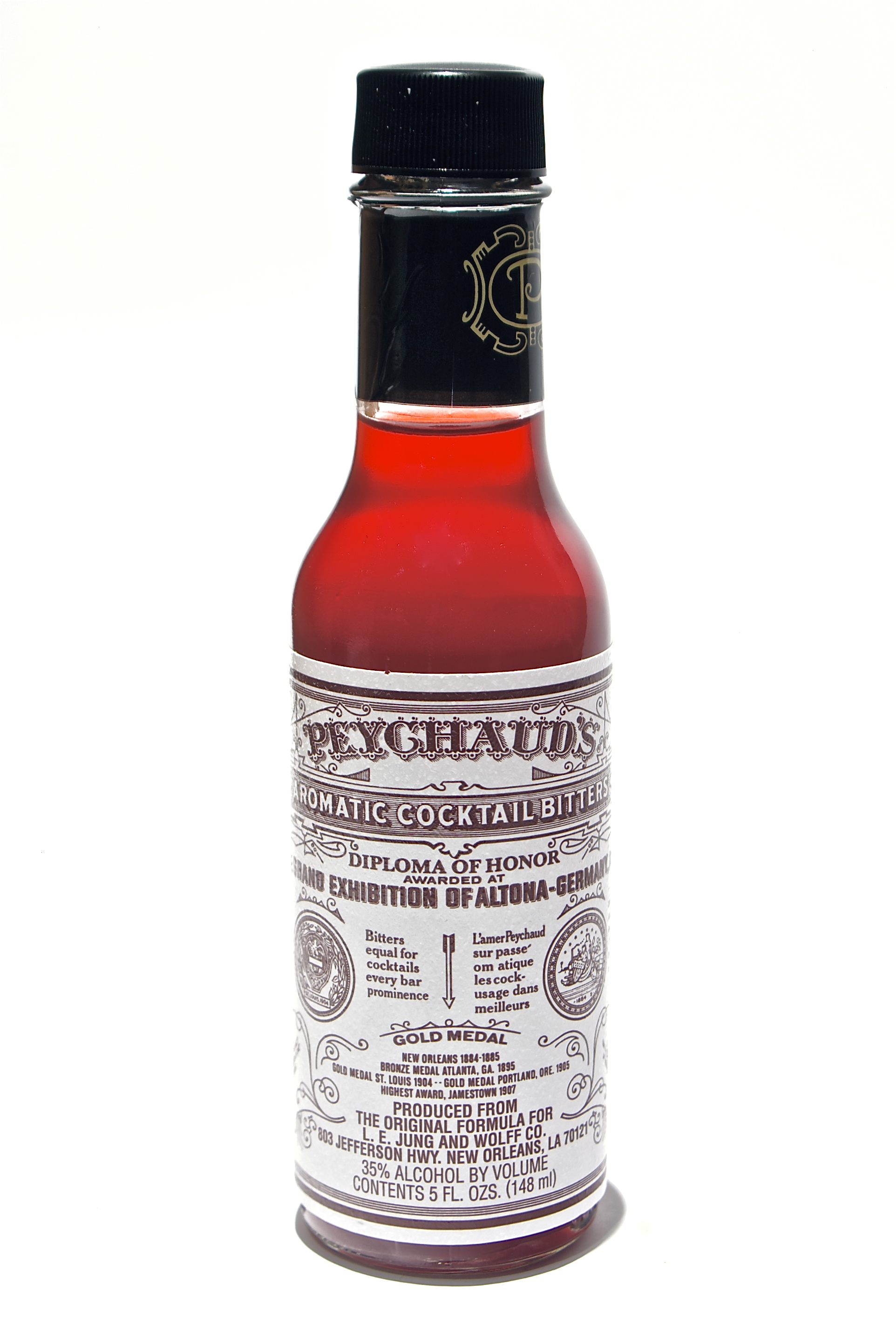
Peychaud's Bitters

Peychaud's bitters is a bitters distributed by the American Sazerac Company. It was created between 1849 and 1857 by Antoine Amédée Peychaud, a Creole apothecary from the French colony of Saint-Domingue (now Haiti) who traveled to New Orleans, Louisiana, around 1793. It is a gentian-based bitters, comparable to Angostura bitters, but with a predominant anise aroma combined with a background of mint. It is currently produced at the Buffalo Trace Distillery in Frankfort, Kentucky.

== Cocktails ==
Peychaud's bitters is a distinctive ingredient in certain cocktails, particularly those from New Orleans, most famously the Sazerac cocktail and the Vieux Carré. Other cocktails that feature Peychaud's bitters include the Pendennis Club.
