= Divine Secrets of the Ya-Ya Sisterhood =

Novel by Rebecca Wells

- First edition
- Author: Rebecca Wells
- Language: English
- Publisher: HarperCollins
- Publication date: 22 May 1996
- Publication place: United States
- Media type: Print
- Pages: 368 p. (First edition hardcover)
- ISBN: 0-06-017328-9
- OCLC: 34026753
- Dewey Decimal: 813/.54 20
- LC Class: PS3573.E4937 D58 1996
- Preceded by: Little Altars Everywhere(prequel)
- Followed by: Ya-Yas in Bloom, The Crowning Glory of Calla Lily Ponder

Divine Secrets of the Ya-Ya Sisterhood is a 1996 novel written by Rebecca Wells. It follows the novel Little Altars Everywhere. In 2005, Wells wrote Ya-Yas in Bloom and then The Crowning Glory of Calla Lily Ponder. Divine Secrets of the Ya-Ya Sisterhood tells the story of the downward spiraling mother-daughter relationship of Vivian Walker and Siddalee Walker.

== Background ==
Wells spent four years writing the novel. She worked mostly in the early morning. Wells stated the novel had little resemblance to her own life and the only autobiographical element was the name of a dog included in the story.

== Characters ==
- Viviane Joan "Vivi" Abbott Walker

Vivi, also known as "Queen Dancing Creek," is one of the main characters. She is the mother of Siddalee, Lulu, Little Shep and Baylor, and she is unhappily married to Shep Walker. Growing up in Thornton, Louisiana with her three best friends, she is the daughter of Mary Katherine "Buggy" Abbott and Taylor Abbott. She is emotionally abused by her jealous mother when her father gives her a ring for her birthday. Vivi is very dramatic and enjoys being the star of any group she is in. She is also deeply scarred by the abuse of her childhood. Vivi's high school sweetheart is Teensy's brother Jacques "Jack" Whitman, who is killed during World War II.

- Aimee "Teensy" Malissa Whitman Claiborne

Known as "Princess Naked as a Jaybird," in the sisterhood, she is the daughter of Genevieve St. Claire Whitman and Mr Whitman. Genevieve acts as a mother figure to the group. Genevieve is from the bayou area and speaks Cajun French when not in earshot of her husband. Teensy is fun-loving and enjoys taking her clothes off—as a child, for play, and as an adult, as part of a striptease act she does for her friends. She is happily married to Chick Claiborne, her high school sweetheart, and has two children, Jack and Genny.

- Denise "Necie" Rose Kelleher Ogden

Crowned "Countess Singing Cloud," Necie is the gentlest, most steady member of the sisterhood. She is known for "thinking pretty pink and blue thoughts." She is the only one of the group to never smoke and to take a Lenten attempt to give up alcohol seriously. She is more religious than the rest of the group. Necie is married with seven children.

- Caroline "Caro" Eliza Bennett Brewer

Known to the Ya-Yas as "Duchess Soaring Hawk." Caro is the most confrontational, hardest member of the group. She often takes care of matters and is the one who comes to Vivi's aid when Vivi "drops her basket" as a mother and wife. Caro was married to Blain Brewer with whom she has two children, but he left her for a man he was seeing in the French Quarter. After initially threatening him with an unloaded gun, Caro eventually forgave Blaine, and he and his lover are now an important part of Caro's life. Caro is the Ya-Ya that Sidda reaches out to in order to find out more about the scrapbook her mother sent. She is suffering from emphysema and carries around an oxygen tank for when she needs it.

- Siddalee "Sidda" Walker

Oldest daughter of Vivi Walker and fiancée of Connor McGill. Sidda is a play director. After an interview with the New York Times, Sidda and her mother stop speaking to each other. She postpones her engagement to Connor and escapes to a friend's family cabin in Washington State. The Ya-Yas surprise her there and help her to learn why her mother was the way she was while Sidda was growing up.

- Connor McGill

Sidda's fiancé, whom she loves deeply. He doesn't understand Sidda's constant fear of love, nor why she will not talk to Vivi.

- Shepley James "Big Shep" Walker

Vivi's husband. Though Vivi never truly loved Shep like she did Jack, Shep loves Vivi and only wants her to be happy.

- Newton Jacques "Jack" Whitman

Vivi's childhood love and Teensy's brother. He joined the Air Force to please his father in WWII, but died in a plane crash.

- Mary Katherine Bowman "Buggy" Abbott

Vivi's mother and wife of Taylor Charles Abbott. She was a devout Catholic and never really loved Taylor and vice versa. Buggy was always jealous of the attention and love Taylor showered upon Vivi, enough to even falsely accuse her of incest as a teenager.

- Taylor Charles Abbott

Vivi's father and husband of Mary Katherine Bowman Abbott. He favored Vivi over her mother and gave Vivi a ring on her sixteenth birthday to prove that. He used the belt with his kids.

- Shepley "Little Shep" Walker, Jr

Son of Vivi Walker and brother of Sidda. He stops talking to Sidda after the New York Times article.

- Baylor Walker

Son of Vivi Walker and brother of Sidda. He is the only sibling of Sidda's who still talks to her after the New York Times article.

- Tallulah "Lulu" Walker

Daughter of Vivi Walker and sister of Sidda. She stops talking to Sidda after the New York Times article.

In 1932, Vivi and the Ya-Yas were disqualified from a Shirley Temple Look-Alike Contest for unladylike behavior. Sixty years later, they're "bucking seventy," and still making waves. They persuade Vivi to send Sidda a scrapbook of girlhood mementos entitled "Divine Secrets of the Ya-Ya Sisterhood."

Sidda retreats to a cabin on Washington State's Olympic Peninsula, tormented by fear and uncertainty about the future, and intent on discovering a key to the tangle of anger and tenderness she feels toward her mother. But the album reveals more questions than answers, and leads Sidda to encounter the unknowable mystery of life and the legacy of imperfect love.

== Film adaptation ==
Director Callie Khouri adapted Divine Secrets of the Ya-Ya Sisterhood into a film in 2002. This became Rebecca Wells' first novel to be adapted into a film. Sandra Bullock (Sidda) and Ellen Burstyn (Vivi) starred as the two main characters of the film as well as James Garner (Big Shep) and Maggie Smith (Caro).

== Reception ==
Divine Secrets of the Ya-Ya Sisterhood became a No. 1 New York Times bestseller. A number of critics praised the book; The Washington Post stated that the book is "a very entertaining and ultimately deeply moving novel about the complex bonds between a mother and a daughter."

== Awards ==
Divine Secrets of the Ya-Ya Sisterhood was shortlisted for the Women's Prize for Fiction in 2000. Award panel member Bonnie Greer praised the book's emotional impact. But poet Fiona Pitt-Kethley criticized the decision.
