= Little Altars Everywhere =

1992 short story collection by Rebecca Wells

- First edition cover
- Author: Rebecca Wells
- Language: English
- Genre: Anthology
- Publisher: HarperCollins
- Publication date: 1 Aug 1992
- Publication place: United States
- Media type: Print (hardback & paperback)
- Pages: 224 p. (first edition, hardback)
- ISBN: 0-06-019362-X (first edition, hardback)
- OCLC: 40557184
- Followed by: Divine Secrets of the Ya-Ya Sisterhood

Little Altars Everywhere is a 1992 short story collection by Rebecca Wells which chronicles the adventures of the Ya-Ya Sisterhood—four eccentric women—and their children, affectionately called the Petites Ya-Yas.

== Plot introduction ==
Author Rebecca Wells alternates between setting her short stories in the 1960s, when Siddalee Walker, daughter of Vivi, is growing up, and the early 1990s, when Sidda is grown and dealing with the consequences of her turbulent childhood. It is the prequel to the 1996 novel Divine Secrets of the Ya-Ya Sisterhood. Each chapter is narrated by a different person (Little Shep, Sidda, Lulu, etc.).

== Contents ==
- "Ooh! My Soul" — Siddalee, 1991

=== Part One ===
- "Wilderness Training" — Siddalee, 1963
- "Choreography" — Siddalee, 1961
- "Wandering Eye" — Big Shep, 1962
- "Skinny-Dipping" — Baylor, 1963
- "Bookworms" — Viviane, 1964
- "Cruelty to Animals" — Little Shep, 1964
- "Beatitudes" — Siddalee, 1963
- "The Elf and the Fair" — Siddalee, 1963
- "The Princess of Gimmee" — Lulu, 1967
- "Hair of the Dog" — Siddalee, 1965

=== Part Two ===
- "Willetta's Witness" — Willetta, 1990
- "Snuggling" — Little Shep, 1990
- "Catfish Dreams" — Baylor, 1990
- "E-Z Boy War" — Big Shep, 1991
- "Playboys' Scrapbook" — Chaney, 1991
- "Looking for My Mules" — Viviane, 1991
- "The First Imperfect Divine Compassion Baptism Video" — Siddalee, 1991

== Development ==
=== Publication history ===
Little Altars Everywhere was published by HarperCollins on August 1, 1992.

== Reception ==
The collection received mixed reviews upon release, with Kirkus Reviews describing it as being "somewhat disjointed but appealing." Publishers Weekly complimented some individual stories but criticized the structure and the dialogue.
