= Rebecca Wells =

American writer (born 1953)

- Born: February 3, 1953 (age 73); Alexandria, Louisiana, U.S.
- Occupations: Novelist; actor; theater director
- Writing career
- Language: English
- Notable works: Divine Secrets of the Ya-Ya Sisterhood; Little Altars Everywhere
- Website: rebeccawellsbooks.com

Rebecca Wells (born February 3, 1953) is an American author, actor, and playwright known for the Ya-Ya Sisterhood series, which includes the books Divine Secrets of the Ya-Ya Sisterhood, Little Altars Everywhere, Ya-Yas in Bloom, and The Crowning Glory of Calla Lily Ponder.

== Background ==
Wells was born and raised in Alexandria, Louisiana, where her family owned and ran a cotton farm. She attended Louisiana State University and, after graduating, the Naropa Institute in Boulder, Colorado, where she studied language and consciousness with Allen Ginsberg and Choyyam Trungapa Rinpoche, as well as acting, movement, and voice with members of The Living Theatre. She then went to New York City, where she studied the Stanislavski Method of acting.

In 1982 she moved to Seattle, Washington, making her home on Bainbridge Island. She currently lives in Nashville, Tennessee.

== Writing career ==
Wells' first book, Little Altars Everywhere, (1992) recounts the multi-layered saga of the turbulent Walker family in Thornton, Louisiana, from the 1960s to the present and introduces the characters Siddalee Walker, her mother Viviane, and her mother's best friends, the Ya-Yas, whose stories continue in Wells' other books. It won the Western States Book Award and became a New York Times bestseller.

Her second novel, Divine Secrets of the Ya-Ya Sisterhood (1996) explores Siddalee's troubled relationship with her mother, and the deeper understanding she gains when her mother sends her the "Divine Secrets of the Ya-Ya Sisterhood," a scrapbook chronicling the girlhood adventures of Vivi and her three best friends. A number one New York Times bestseller, it won the American Booksellers Award, and was short-listed for the Orange Prize for Fiction (now known as the Baileys Women's Prize for Fiction). It was adapted for the 2002 film Divine Secrets of the Ya-Ya Sisterhood starring Sandra Bullock as Siddalee Walker and Ellen Burstyn as her mother Vivi.

Wells' third novel, Ya-Yas in Bloom, (2005) reveals the roots of the friendship of the Ya-Ya sisterhood in the 1930s. Ya-Yas in Bloom reached the #3 spot on both the New York Times and Publishers Weekly bestseller lists

Her fourth novel, The Crowning Glory of Calla Lily Ponder, (2009) set in 1960s Louisiana, departs from the characters in Wells' other books, an introduces a new character, Calla Lily Ponder, and her friends.

== Theater work ==
A playwright and actor before she began writing fiction, Wells is known for her one-woman show, Splittin' Hairs, and her play, Gloria Duplex, about a French Quarter erotic dancer who sees the face of God in a disco ball, which was called "one of the glories of the decade" by the Seattle Post-Intelligencer.

== Novels ==
- Little Altars Everywhere (1992)
- Divine Secrets of the Ya-Ya Sisterhood (1996)
- Ya-Yas in Bloom (2005)
- The Crowning Glory of Calla Lily Ponder (2009)

== Short stories ==
- Little Altars Everywhere (1992)
