= List of counties in New York =

Counties of New York
- Location: State of New York
- Number: 62
- Populations: 5,006 (Hamilton) – 2,653,963 (Kings)
- Areas: 33.77 square miles (87.5 km^{2}) (New York) – 2,821 square miles (7,310 km^{2}) (St. Lawrence)
- Government: County government
- Subdivisions: Cities, Towns, Indian Reservations

There are 62 counties in the U.S. state of New York.

The first 12 counties were created in 1683 soon after the British took over the Dutch colony of New Amsterdam; two of these counties were later abolished, their land going to Massachusetts. These counties were carried over after independence in 1783, but most of the counties were created by the state in the 19th century. The newest county is the Bronx, created in 1914 from the portions of New York County that had been annexed from Westchester County in the late 19th century. New York's counties are named for various Native American words; British provinces, counties, cities, and royalty; early American statesmen and military personnel; and New York State politicians.

== Five boroughs of New York City ==
The five New York City counties are each coextensive with its five boroughs. They are New York County (Manhattan), Kings County (Brooklyn), Bronx County (The Bronx), Richmond County (Staten Island), and Queens County (Queens). They are the smallest counties in New York by area.

In contrast to other counties of New York, the powers of the five boroughs of New York City are very limited and in nearly all respects are governed by the city government. Some officials are elected on a borough-wide basis. The five borough presidents deal with Borough matters, while the district attorneys and all county and state supreme court judges are generally concerned with the administration of state criminal and civil law and local ordinances in the county. There are no official county seats, but the locations of borough halls and courthouses bestow certain neighborhoods an informal designation as county seats within their boroughs:

- The Bronx County Courthouse and the borough's main post office are located in the Concourse section of the Bronx. The separate Bronx Borough Hall burned down in 1969.
- Brooklyn Borough Hall, the Federal Building and Post Office, and county Supreme Court are in Downtown Brooklyn.
- The Municipal Building, where the Manhattan Borough President's office is located, and most courthouses are in the downtown Civic Center. The General Post Office is in Midtown Manhattan.
- Queens Borough Hall and a courthouse are in Kew Gardens. Another major courthouse, post office, and the Long Island Railroad hub are in Jamaica. Queens also has general post offices in Flushing, Long Island City and Far Rockaway.
- Staten Island Borough Hall, three courthouses, and the St. George Terminal transportation hub are in the St. George neighborhood.

== List of counties ==
County	FIPS Code	County seat	Est.	Formed from	Named for	Density (Pop./mi^{2})	Pop. (2025)	Area	Map
Albany County	001	Albany	Nov 1, 1683	One of 12 original counties created in the New York colony	James II of England (James VII of Scotland) (1633–1701), who was Duke of York (English title) and Duke of Albany (Scottish title) before becoming King of England, Ireland, and Scotland.	602.67	321,225	533 sq mi (1,380 km^{2})	State map highlighting Albany County
Allegany County	003	Belmont	Apr 7, 1806	Genesee County	A variant spelling of the Allegheny River	45.26	46,800	1,034 sq mi (2,678 km^{2})	State map highlighting Allegany County
Bronx County	005	none (sui generis)	Jan 1, 1914	New York County	Jonas Bronck (d. 1643), an early Swedish-born Dutch settler	24,487.76	1,406,332	57.43 sq mi (149 km^{2})	State map highlighting Bronx County
Broome County	007	Binghamton	Mar 28, 1806	Tioga County	John Broome (1738–1810), fourth Lieutenant Governor of New York	273.76	195,736	715 sq mi (1,852 km^{2})	State map highlighting Broome County
Cattaraugus County	009	Little Valley	Mar 11, 1808	Genesee County	A word from an uncertain Iroquoian language meaning "bad smelling banks", referring to the odor of natural gas which leaked from Cattaraugus Creek	57.55	75,390	1,310 sq mi (3,393 km^{2})	State map highlighting Cattaraugus County
Cayuga County	011	Auburn	Mar 8, 1799	Onondaga County	The Cayuga tribe of Native Americans	86.07	74,365	864 sq mi (2,238 km^{2})	State map highlighting Cayuga County
Chautauqua County	013	Mayville	Mar 11, 1808	Genesee County	Loanword from the Erie language describing Chautauqua Lake; language now lost and cannot be translated	82.75	124,126	1,500 sq mi (3,885 km^{2})	State map highlighting Chautauqua County
Chemung County	015	Elmira	Mar 29, 1836	Tioga County	A Lenape word meaning "big horn", which was the name of a local Native American village	195.75	80,415	410.81 sq mi (1,064 km^{2})	State map highlighting Chemung County
Chenango County	017	Norwich	Mar 15, 1798	Tioga County and Herkimer County	An Onondaga word meaning "large bull-thistle"	50.86	45,715	898.85 sq mi (2,328 km^{2})	State map highlighting Chenango County
Clinton County	019	Plattsburgh	Mar 7, 1788	Washington County	George Clinton (1739–1812), fourth Vice President of the United States and first and third Governor of New York	69.89	78,138	1,118 sq mi (2,896 km^{2})	State map highlighting Clinton County
Columbia County	021	Hudson	Apr 4, 1786	Albany County	Christopher Columbus (1451–1506), the European explorer	92.85	60,168	648 sq mi (1,678 km^{2})	State map highlighting Columbia County
Cortland County	023	Cortland	Apr 8, 1808	Onondaga County	Pierre Van Cortlandt (1721–1814), first Lieutenant Governor of New York	91.33	45,850	502 sq mi (1,300 km^{2})	State map highlighting Cortland County
Delaware County	025	Delhi	Mar 10, 1797	Otsego County and Ulster County	Thomas West, 3rd Baron De La Warr (1577–1618), an early colonial leader in Virginia. Name applied to the bay, river, and Lenape Native Americans	30.18	44,305	1,468 sq mi (3,802 km^{2})	State map highlighting Delaware County
Dutchess County	027	Poughkeepsie	Nov 1, 1683	One of 12 original counties created in the New York colony	Mary of Modena (1658–1718), Duchess of York and wife of King James II of England	364.49	300,708	825 sq mi (2,137 km^{2})	State map highlighting Dutchess County
Erie County	029	Buffalo	Apr 2, 1821	Niagara County	The Erie tribe of Native Americans	771.59	946,741	1,227 sq mi (3,178 km^{2})	State map highlighting Erie County
Essex County	031	Elizabethtown	Mar 1, 1799	Clinton County	The county of Essex in England	19.02	36,438	1,916 sq mi (4,962 km^{2})	State map highlighting Essex County
Franklin County	033	Malone	Mar 11, 1808	Clinton County	Benjamin Franklin (1706–1790), the early American printer, scientist, and statesman	27.40	46,500	1,697 sq mi (4,395 km^{2})	State map highlighting Franklin County
Fulton County	035	Johnstown	Apr 18, 1838	Montgomery County	Robert Fulton (1765–1815), inventor of the steamship	97.97	52,216	533 sq mi (1,380 km^{2})	State map highlighting Fulton County
Genesee County	037	Batavia	Mar 30, 1802	Ontario County and land acquired in the Holland Purchase	A Seneca phrase meaning "good valley"	118.01	58,416	495 sq mi (1,282 km^{2})	State map highlighting Genesee County
Greene County	039	Catskill	Mar 25, 1800	Albany County and Ulster County	Nathanael Greene (1742–1786), the American Revolutionary War general	71.79	47,238	658 sq mi (1,704 km^{2})	State map highlighting Greene County
Hamilton County	041	Lake Pleasant	Apr 12, 1816	Montgomery County	Alexander Hamilton (1755–1804), the early American political theorist and first Secretary of the Treasury	2.77	5,006	1,808 sq mi (4,683 km^{2})	State map highlighting Hamilton County
Herkimer County	043	Herkimer	Feb 16, 1791	Montgomery County	Nicholas Herkimer (1728–1777), the American Revolutionary War general	40.62	59,219	1,458 sq mi (3,776 km^{2})	State map highlighting Herkimer County
Jefferson County	045	Watertown	Mar 28, 1805	Oneida County	Thomas Jefferson (1743–1826), the early American statesman, author of the Declaration of Independence, and third President of the United States	60.06	111,540	1,857 sq mi (4,810 km^{2})	State map highlighting Jefferson County
Kings County	047	none (sui generis)	Nov 1, 1683	One of 12 original counties created in the New York colony	King Charles II of England (1630–1685)	27,388.68	2,653,963	96.9 sq mi (251 km^{2})	State map highlighting Kings County
Lewis County	049	Lowville	Mar 28, 1805	Oneida County	Morgan Lewis (1754–1844), the fourth Governor of New York	20.53	26,479	1,290 sq mi (3,341 km^{2})	State map highlighting Lewis County
Livingston County	051	Geneseo	Feb 23, 1821	Genesee County and Ontario County	Robert Livingston (1746–1813), the early American statesman and New York delegate to the Continental Congress	96.00	61,438	640 sq mi (1,658 km^{2})	State map highlighting Livingston County
Madison County	053	Wampsville	Mar 21, 1806	Chenango County	James Madison (1751–1836), the early American statesman, principal author of the Constitution of the United States, and fourth President of the United States	101.39	67,120	662 sq mi (1,715 km^{2})	State map highlighting Madison County
Monroe County	055	Rochester	Feb 23, 1821	Genesee County and Ontario County	James Monroe (1758–1831), the early American statesman and fifth President of the United States	549.42	750,506	1,366 sq mi (3,538 km^{2})	State map highlighting Monroe County
Montgomery County	057	Fonda	Mar 12, 1772	Albany County	Originally Tryon County after colonial governor William Tryon (1729–1788), renamed after the American Revolutionary War general Richard Montgomery (1738–1775) in 1784	122.06	50,046	410 sq mi (1,062 km^{2})	State map highlighting Montgomery County
Nassau County	059	Mineola	Jan 1, 1899	Queens County	The Princes of Orange-Nassau ruled the Netherlands when Long Island was a Dutch colony	3,088.17	1,398,939	453 sq mi (1,173 km^{2})	State map highlighting Nassau County
New York County	061	none (sui generis)	Nov 1, 1683	One of 12 original counties created in the New York colony	King James II of England (1633–1701), who was Duke of York and Albany before he ascended the throne of England, Duke of York being his English title	49,300.03	1,664,862	33.77 sq mi (87 km^{2})	State map highlighting New York County
Niagara County	063	Lockport	Mar 11, 1808	Genesee County	The Iroquoian name of a tribe within the Neutral Nation, the exact translation of which remains disputed	183.26	208,912	1,140 sq mi (2,953 km^{2})	State map highlighting Niagara County
Oneida County	065	Utica	Mar 15, 1798	Herkimer County	The Oneida tribe of Native Americans	186.64	226,392	1,213 sq mi (3,142 km^{2})	State map highlighting Oneida County
Onondaga County	067	Syracuse	Mar 5, 1794	Herkimer County	The Onondaga tribe of Native Americans	578.89	466,584	806 sq mi (2,088 km^{2})	State map highlighting Onondaga County
Ontario County	069	Canandaigua	Jan 27, 1789	Land acquired in the Phelps and Gorham Purchase	An Iroquoian word meaning "beautiful lake"	170.89	113,130	662 sq mi (1,715 km^{2})	State map highlighting Ontario County
Orange County	071	Goshen	Nov 1, 1683	One of 12 original counties created in the New York colony	William of Orange-Nassau (1650–1702), who became King William III of England	497.82	417,669	839 sq mi (2,173 km^{2})	State map highlighting Orange County
Orleans County	073	Albion	Apr 15, 1825	Genesee County	The French Royal House of Orléans	48.75	39,825	817 sq mi (2,116 km^{2})	State map highlighting Orleans County
Oswego County	075	Oswego	Mar 1, 1816	Oneida County and Onondaga County	The Oswego River, from an Iroquoian word meaning "the outpouring", referring to the mouth of the river	90.37	118,569	1,312 sq mi (3,398 km^{2})	State map highlighting Oswego County
Otsego County	077	Cooperstown	Feb 16, 1791	Montgomery County	A Native American word meaning "place of the rock"	60.41	60,589	1,003 sq mi (2,598 km^{2})	State map highlighting Otsego County
Putnam County	079	Carmel Hamlet	Jun 12, 1812	Dutchess County	Israel Putnam (1718–1790), an American Revolutionary War general	402.55	99,028	246 sq mi (637 km^{2})	State map highlighting Putnam County
Queens County	081	none (sui generis)	Nov 1, 1683	One of 12 original counties created in the New York colony	Catherine of Braganza (1638–1705), Queen of England and wife of King Charles II of England	13,227.41	2,358,182	178.28 sq mi (462 km^{2})	State map highlighting Queens County
Rensselaer County	083	Troy	Feb 7, 1791	Albany County	In honor of the family of Kiliaen van Rensselaer (before 1596 – after 1643), the early landholder in the Dutch New Netherland colony	241.37	160,510	665 sq mi (1,722 km^{2})	State map highlighting Rensselaer County
Richmond County	085	none (sui generis)	Nov 1, 1683	One of 12 original counties created in the New York colony	Charles Lennox, 1st Duke of Richmond (1672–1723), the illegitimate son of King Charles II of England	4,890.63	501,290	102.5 sq mi (265 km^{2})	State map highlighting Richmond County
Rockland County	087	New City	Feb 23, 1798	Orange County	Early settlers' description of terrain as "rocky land"	1,795.96	357,397	199 sq mi (515 km^{2})	State map highlighting Rockland County
St. Lawrence County	089	Canton	Mar 3, 1802	Clinton County, Herkimer County, and Montgomery County	The St Lawrence River, which forms the northern border of the county and New York State	37.39	105,488	2,821 sq mi (7,306 km^{2})	State map highlighting St. Lawrence County
Saratoga County	091	Ballston Spa	Feb 7, 1791	Albany County	A corruption of a Native American word meaning "the hill beside the river"	285.95	241,343	844 sq mi (2,186 km^{2})	State map highlighting Saratoga County
Schenectady County	093	Schenectady	Mar 7, 1809	Albany County	A Mohawk word meaning "on the other side of the pine lands"	774.20	162,581	210 sq mi (544 km^{2})	State map highlighting Schenectady County
Schoharie County	095	Schoharie	Jun 1, 1795	Albany County and Otsego County	A Mohawk word meaning "floating driftwood"	48.20	30,176	626 sq mi (1,621 km^{2})	State map highlighting Schoharie County
Schuyler County	097	Watkins Glen	Apr 17, 1854	Chemung County, Steuben County, and Tompkins County	Philip Schuyler (1733–1804), the American Revolutionary War general and Senator from New York	49.49	16,924	342 sq mi (886 km^{2})	State map highlighting Schuyler County
Seneca County	099	Waterloo	Mar 24, 1804	Cayuga County	The Seneca tribe of Native Americans	101.18	32,883	325 sq mi (842 km^{2})	State map highlighting Seneca County
Steuben County	101	Bath	Mar 18, 1796	Ontario County	Friedrich Wilhelm von Steuben (1730–1794), the Prussian general who assisted the Continental Army during the American Revolutionary War	65.42	91,855	1,404 sq mi (3,636 km^{2})	State map highlighting Steuben County
Suffolk County	103	Riverhead	Nov 1, 1683	One of 12 original counties created in the New York colony	The county of Suffolk in England	651.53	1,546,090	2,373 sq mi (6,146 km^{2})	State map highlighting Suffolk County
Sullivan County	105	Monticello	Mar 27, 1809	Ulster County	John Sullivan (1740–1795), an American Revolutionary War general	80.83	80,586	997 sq mi (2,582 km^{2})	State map highlighting Sullivan County
Tioga County	107	Owego	Feb 16, 1791	Montgomery County	A Native American word meaning "at the forks", describing a meeting place	90.73	47,453	523 sq mi (1,355 km^{2})	State map highlighting Tioga County
Tompkins County	109	Ithaca	Apr 7, 1817	Cayuga County and Seneca County	Daniel D. Tompkins (1774–1825), the 6th Vice President of the United States	218.59	104,047	476 sq mi (1,233 km^{2})	State map highlighting Tompkins County
Ulster County	111	Kingston	Nov 1, 1683	One of 12 original counties created in the New York colony	The Irish province of Ulster, then an earldom of the Duke of York, later King James II of England	157.91	183,330	1,161 sq mi (3,007 km^{2})	State map highlighting Ulster County
Warren County	113	Queensbury	Mar 12, 1813	Washington County	Joseph Warren (1741–1775), the early American patriot and American Revolutionary War general	74.74	65,020	870 sq mi (2,253 km^{2})	State map highlighting Warren County
Washington County	115	Fort Edward	Mar 12, 1772	Albany County	Originally Charlotte County, renamed in 1784 after George Washington (1732–1799), the American Revolutionary War general and first President of the United States	70.16	59,353	846 sq mi (2,191 km^{2})	State map highlighting Washington County
Wayne County	117	Lyons	Apr 11, 1823	Ontario County and Seneca County	General Anthony Wayne (1745–1796), the American Revolutionary War general	65.93	91,250	1,384 sq mi (3,585 km^{2})	State map highlighting Wayne County
Westchester County	119	White Plains	Nov 1, 1683	One of 12 original counties created in the New York colony	The city of Chester in England	2,031.49	1,015,743	500 sq mi (1,295 km^{2})	State map highlighting Westchester County
Wyoming County	121	Warsaw	May 19, 1841	Genesee County	A modification of a word from the Lenape language meaning "broad bottom lands"	66.68	39,741	596 sq mi (1,544 km^{2})	State map highlighting Wyoming County
Yates County	123	Penn Yan	Feb 5, 1823	Ontario County and Steuben County	Joseph C. Yates (1768–1837), eighth Governor of New York	65.28	24,547	376 sq mi (974 km^{2})	State map highlighting Yates County

== Racial / Ethnic Profile of counties in New York (2020 Census) ==
Racial / Ethnic Profile of counties in New York (2020 Census)
Following is a table of counties in New York by race/ethnicity. The majority racial/ethnic group is coded per the key below.

	Majority minority with no dominant group
	Majority White
New York	Majority Black
	Majority HispanicNew York
	Majority Asian
	Majority Native American

Racial and ethnic composition of counties in New York (2020 Census) (NH = Non-Hispanic) Note: the US Census treats Hispanic/Latino as an ethnic category. This table excludes Latinos from the racial categories and assigns them to a separate category. Hispanics/Latinos may be of any race.
County	Location of County	Total Population	White alone (NH)	%	Black or African American alone (NH)	%	Native American or Alaska Native alone (NH)	%	Asian alone (NH)	%	Pacific Islander alone (NH)	%	Other race alone (NH)	%	Mixed race or Multiracial (NH)	%	Hispanic or Latino (any race)	%
Albany		314,848	210,895	66.98%	40,667	12.92%	494	0.16%	24,363	7.74%	166	0.05%	1,821	0.58%	14,847	4.72%	21,595	6.86%
Allegany		46,456	42,327	91.11%	809	1.74%	91	0.20%	373	0.80%	6	0.01%	218	0.47%	1,667	3.59%	965	2.08%
Bronx		1,472,654	130,796	8.88%	419,393	28.48%	3,087	0.21%	67,766	4.60%	457	0.03%	16,322	1.11%	28,370	1.93%	806,463	54.76%
Broome		198,683	156,173	78.60%	11,547	5.81%	413	0.21%	9,337	4.70%	64	0.03%	864	0.43%	10,000	5.03%	10,285	5.18%
Cattaraugus		77,042	67,554	87.68%	996	1.29%	2,661	3.45%	560	0.73%	9	0.01%	212	0.28%	3,435	4.46%	1,615	2.10%
Cayuga		76,248	66,313	86.97%	2,727	3.58%	224	0.29%	379	0.50%	54	0.07%	253	0.33%	3,662	4.80%	2,636	3.46%
Chautauqua		127,657	106,063	83.08%	2,891	2.26%	497	0.39%	796	0.62%	49	0.04%	363	0.28%	5,229	4.10%	11,769	9.22%
Chemung		84,148	69,559	82.66%	5,009	5.95%	198	0.24%	1,426	1.69%	15	0.02%	228	0.27%	4,775	5.67%	2,938	3.49%
Chenango		47,220	43,153	91.39%	345	0.73%	93	0.20%	236	0.50%	15	0.03%	109	0.23%	2,152	4.56%	1,117	2.37%
Clinton		79,843	69,251	86.73%	2,753	3.45%	238	0.30%	957	1.20%	24	0.03%	270	0.34%	3,494	4.38%	2,856	3.58%
Columbia		61,570	50,795	82.50%	2,421	3.93%	70	0.11%	1,423	2.31%	16	0.03%	348	0.57%	2,955	4.80%	3,542	5.75%
Cortland		46,809	40,801	87.16%	829	1.77%	113	0.24%	1,018	2.17%	6	0.01%	204	0.44%	2,180	4.66%	1,658	3.54%
Delaware		44,308	38,821	87.62%	1,003	2.26%	93	0.21%	480	1.08%	7	0.02%	154	0.35%	1,765	3.98%	1,985	4.48%
Dutchess		295,911	198,495	67.08%	30,126	10.18%	387	0.13%	10,635	3.59%	67	0.02%	1,956	0.66%	12,021	4.06%	42,224	14.27%
Erie		954,236	678,236	71.08%	129,874	13.61%	4,667	0.49%	46,090	4.83%	199	0.02%	3,254	0.34%	32,258	3.38%	59,658	6.25%
Essex		37,381	33,714	90.19%	610	1.63%	74	0.20%	229	0.61%	7	0.02%	133	0.36%	1,636	4.38%	978	2.62%
Franklin		47,555	38,559	81.08%	1,686	3.55%	4,102	8.63%	191	0.40%	0	0.00%	91	0.19%	1,539	3.24%	1,387	2.92%
Fulton		53,324	47,051	88.24%	966	1.81%	89	0.17%	343	0.64%	0	0.00%	164	0.31%	2,577	4.83%	2,134	4.00%
Genesee		58,388	50,960	87.28%	1,358	2.33%	361	0.62%	412	0.71%	16	0.03%	173	0.30%	2,356	4.04%	2,752	4.71%
Greene		47,931	39,494	82.40%	2,159	4.50%	100	0.21%	500	1.04%	3	0.01%	238	0.50%	2,328	4.86%	3,109	6.49%
Hamilton		5,107	4,769	93.38%	30	0.59%	14	0.27%	12	0.23%	1	0.02%	5	0.10%	176	3.45%	100	1.96%
Herkimer		60,139	54,653	90.88%	682	1.13%	76	0.13%	359	0.60%	32	0.05%	153	0.25%	2,654	4.41%	1,530	2.54%
Jefferson		116,721	92,755	79.47%	6,271	5.37%	461	0.39%	2,185	1.87%	300	0.26%	501	0.43%	6,258	5.36%	7,990	6.85%
Kings		2,736,074	968,427	35.39%	729,696	26.67%	3,964	0.14%	370,776	13.55%	718	0.03%	32,897	1.20%	113,170	4.14%	516,426	18.87%
Lewis		26,582	24,942	93.83%	103	0.39%	40	0.15%	65	0.24%	11	0.04%	52	0.20%	909	3.42%	460	1.73%
Livingston		61,834	54,611	88.32%	1,071	1.73%	125	0.20%	653	1.06%	6	0.01%	203	0.33%	2,444	3.95%	2,721	4.40%
Madison		68,016	60,965	89.63%	1,071	1.57%	435	0.64%	664	0.98%	11	0.02%	187	0.27%	3,010	4.43%	1,673	2.46%
Monroe		759,443	506,153	66.65%	112,710	14.84%	1,320	0.17%	32,294	4.25%	181	0.02%	2,958	0.39%	31,082	4.09%	72,745	9.58%
Montgomery		49,532	38,237	77.20%	987	1.99%	83	0.17%	479	0.97%	9	0.02%	210	0.42%	2,215	4.47%	7,312	14.76%
Nassau		1,395,774	779,454	55.84%	147,216	10.55%	1,714	0.12%	163,165	11.69%	292	0.02%	11,780	0.84%	35,728	2.56%	256,425	18.37%
New York		1,694,251	793,294	46.82%	199,592	11.78%	1,895	0.11%	219,624	12.96%	882	0.05%	13,335	0.79%	62,989	3.72%	402,640	23.77%
Niagara		212,666	173,691	81.67%	16,206	7.62%	2,294	1.08%	2,439	1.15%	45	0.02%	737	0.35%	9,436	4.44%	7,818	3.68%
Oneida		232,125	180,984	77.97%	14,989	6.46%	508	0.22%	10,522	4.53%	72	0.03%	729	0.31%	9,130	3.93%	15,191	6.54%
Onondaga		476,516	347,290	72.88%	54,410	11.42%	2,940	0.62%	20,119	4.22%	106	0.02%	1,955	0.41%	23,124	4.85%	26,572	5.58%
Ontario		112,458	97,397	86.61%	2,439	2.17%	197	0.18%	1,374	1.22%	23	0.02%	418	0.37%	4,497	4.00%	6,113	5.44%
Orange		401,310	231,848	57.77%	41,341	10.30%	754	0.19%	11,665	2.91%	104	0.03%	12,012	2.99%	13,842	3.45%	89,744	22.36%
Orleans		40,343	34,037	84.37%	1,840	4.56%	177	0.44%	154	0.38%	12	0.03%	141	0.35%	1,895	4.70%	2,087	5.17%
Oswego		117,525	105,710	89.95%	1,370	1.17%	457	0.39%	870	0.74%	19	0.02%	302	0.26%	5,181	4.41%	3,616	3.08%
Otsego		58,524	51,490	87.98%	1,189	2.03%	109	0.19%	813	1.39%	7	0.01%	180	0.31%	2,344	4.01%	2,392	4.09%
Putnam		97,668	71,942	73.66%	2,425	2.48%	80	0.08%	2,146	2.20%	12	0.01%	561	0.57%	2,742	2.81%	17,760	18.18%
Queens		2,405,464	549,358	22.84%	381,375	15.85%	9,576	0.40%	656,583	27.30%	1,110	0.05%	55,489	2.31%	84,112	3.50%	667,861	27.76%
Rensselaer		161,130	124,600	77.33%	11,800	7.32%	310	0.19%	5,711	3.54%	17	0.01%	706	0.44%	8,504	5.28%	9,482	5.88%
Richmond		495,747	277,981	56.07%	46,835	9.45%	624	0.13%	58,753	11.85%	135	0.03%	3,141	0.63%	11,318	2.28%	96,960	19.56%
Rockland		338,329	206,113	60.92%	33,775	9.98%	390	0.12%	20,413	6.03%	42	0.01%	3,445	1.02%	7,700	2.28%	66,451	19.64%
St. Lawrence		108,505	96,556	88.99%	2,788	2.57%	1,143	1.05%	1,089	1.00%	19	0.02%	298	0.27%	3,780	3.48%	2,832	2.61%
Saratoga		235,509	203,781	86.53%	3,752	1.59%	301	0.13%	7,444	3.16%	60	0.03%	833	0.35%	10,671	4.53%	8,667	3.68%
Schenectady		158,061	104,878	66.35%	15,943	10.09%	930	0.59%	8,281	5.24%	130	0.08%	4,469	2.83%	10,925	6.91%	12,505	7.91%
Schoharie		29,714	26,658	89.72%	277	0.93%	68	0.23%	210	0.71%	3	0.01%	123	0.41%	1,300	4.38%	1,075	3.62%
Schuyler		17,898	16,618	92.85%	91	0.51%	38	0.21%	108	0.60%	1	0.01%	43	0.24%	670	3.74%	329	1.84%
Seneca		33,814	29,273	86.57%	1,263	3.74%	151	0.45%	268	0.79%	3	0.01%	80	0.24%	1,409	4.17%	1,367	4.04%
Steuben		93,584	84,338	90.12%	1,416	1.51%	203	0.22%	1,616	1.73%	12	0.01%	301	0.32%	3,980	4.25%	1,718	1.84%
Suffolk		1,525,920	967,330	63.39%	107,268	7.03%	3,102	0.20%	65,019	4.26%	241	0.02%	9,479	0.62%	40,522	2.66%	332,959	21.82%
Sullivan		78,624	52,691	67.02%	6,069	7.72%	174	0.22%	1,569	2.00%	10	0.01%	602	0.77%	3,502	4.45%	14,007	17.82%
Tioga		48,455	44,195	91.21%	434	0.90%	62	0.13%	370	0.76%	12	0.02%	158	0.33%	2,107	4.35%	1,117	2.31%
Tompkins		105,740	76,737	72.57%	4,274	4.04%	248	0.23%	10,487	9.92%	35	0.03%	622	0.59%	6,260	5.92%	7,077	6.69%
Ulster		181,851	136,695	75.17%	10,152	5.58%	306	0.17%	3,778	2.08%	45	0.02%	1,218	0.67%	8,538	4.70%	21,119	11.61%
Warren		65,737	59,299	90.21%	736	1.12%	139	0.21%	729	1.11%	0	0.00%	189	0.29%	2,893	4.40%	1,752	2.67%
Washington		61,302	54,605	89.08%	1,563	2.55%	149	0.24%	319	0.52%	22	0.04%	143	0.23%	2,740	4.47%	1,761	2.87%
Wayne		91,283	79,230	86.80%	2,397	2.63%	171	0.19%	473	0.52%	13	0.01%	272	0.30%	4,213	4.62%	4,514	4.95%
Westchester		1,004,457	497,684	49.55%	131,010	13.04%	1,017	0.10%	64,907	6.46%	150	0.01%	8,651	0.86%	31,704	3.16%	269,334	26.81%
Wyoming		40,531	35,579	87.78%	1,852	4.57%	83	0.20%	217	0.54%	6	0.01%	77	0.19%	1,227	3.03%	1,490	3.68%
Yates		24,774	23,049	93.04%	145	0.59%	28	0.11%	93	0.38%	8	0.03%	77	0.31%	700	2.83%	674	2.72%

== Defunct counties ==
County	Created	Abolished	Fate
Charlotte County	1772	1784	Partitioned. Western part renamed as Washington County and eastern part transferred to Vermont.
Cornwall County	1665	1686	Transferred to the part of Massachusetts that later became the state of Maine and partitioned; one of the 12 original counties created in the New York colony
Cumberland County	1766	1777	Transferred to Vermont and partitioned
Dukes County	November 1, 1683	1692	Transferred to Massachusetts; one of 12 original counties created in the New York colony
Gloucester County	1770	1777	Transferred to Vermont and partitioned
Mexico County	1792	1796	Never settled or incorporated, reallocated to Oneida, Oswego and Jefferson Counties.
Tryon County	1772	1784	Renamed as Montgomery County

== Proposed new counties ==
County	Note
Adirondack County	Would hypothetically consist of portions of northern Essex County and southern Franklin County
Peconic County	Would hypothetically consist of the five easternmost towns in Suffolk County on Long Island.

== See also ==
- List of United States counties and county equivalents
- List of former United States counties
- List of municipalities in New York
- List of towns in New York
- New York State City/County Management Association
