= List of counties in Massachusetts =

Counties of Massachusetts
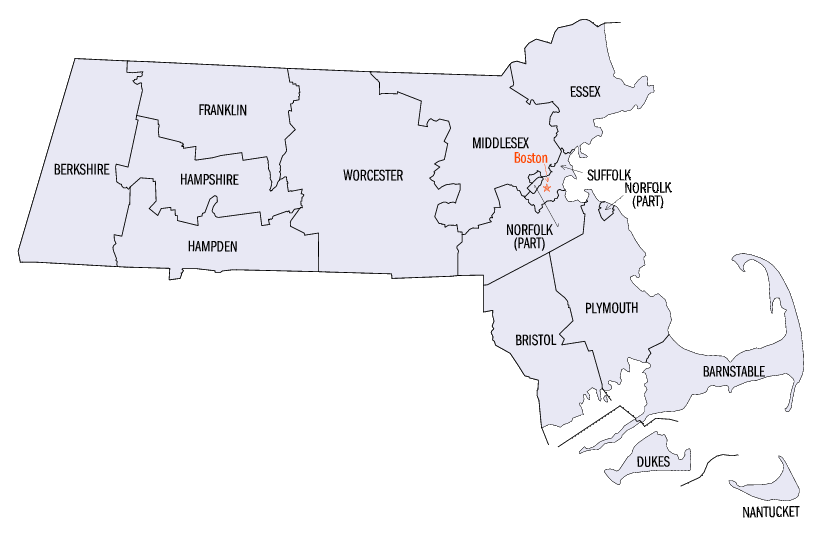
- Location: Commonwealth of Massachusetts
- Number: 14
- Populations: 14,758 (Nantucket) – 1,669,979 (Middlesex)
- Areas: 48 square miles (120 km^{2}) (Nantucket) – 1,513 square miles (3,920 km^{2}) (Worcester)
- Government: County government
- Subdivisions: Cities, towns, villages, unincorporated communities, census-designated places

The Commonwealth of Massachusetts has 14 counties, though eight of these fourteen county governments were abolished between 1997 and 2000. The counties in the southeastern portion of the state retain county-level local government (Barnstable, Bristol, Dukes, Norfolk, Plymouth) or, in one case (Nantucket County), consolidated town-county government. Vestigial judicial and law enforcement districts still follow county boundaries even in the counties whose county-level government has been disestablished, and the counties are still generally recognized as geographic entities if not political ones. Three counties (Barnstable, Hampshire, and Franklin) have formed new county regional compacts to serve as a form of regional governance.

== Abolitions of some county governments ==
County government abolished or disincorporated County government role operated by a municipality (other than city-county consolidation) Current county government County regional compacts to serve as a form of regional governance

Financial difficulties in the mid-1990s, including liabilities associated with the county's public hospital and default on county obligations, left Middlesex County facing insolvency. In 1997 the Massachusetts legislature intervened, abolishing the county government and transferring its assets, debts, and responsibilities to the Commonwealth. Later that year, the Franklin County Commission voted itself out of existence. The law abolishing Middlesex County also provided for the elimination of Hampden County and Worcester County on July 1, 1998. This law was later amended to abolish Hampshire County on January 1, 1999; Essex County and Suffolk County on July 1 of that same year; and Berkshire County on July 1, 2000. State law allows other counties either to abolish themselves, or to reorganize as a "regional council of governments", as Hampshire and Franklin Counties have done. The governments of Bristol, Plymouth, and Norfolk Counties remain substantially unchanged. Barnstable and Dukes Counties have adopted modern county charters, enabling them to act as efficient regional governments. Dukes County in particular has a strong regional planning agency known as the Martha's Vineyard Commission.

Three counties—Barnstable County, Hampshire County, and Franklin County—have established regional governmental compacts that perform limited coordinating functions traditionally associated with county administration. The Barnstable County Regional Government continues to operate under a home rule charter, while the Hampshire Council of Governments and Franklin Regional Council of Governments provide shared municipal services such as public health coordination, emergency planning, cooperative purchasing, and regional planning in areas where most county governments have been abolished or substantially reduced.

== District attorneys ==
Jurisdictional areas for district attorneys are created by state law and while some follow traditional county boundaries, names and geographic areas covered are often different. Criminal matters in Essex County are handled by the district attorney for the Eastern District; in Middlesex County by the district attorney for the Northern District; in Worcester County by the district attorney for the Middle District; in Dukes, Barnstable and Nantucket counties by the district attorney for the Cape and Islands District and in Franklin and Hampshire counties by the district attorney for the Northwestern District. The districts for the counties of Berkshire, Bristol, Hampden, Norfolk, Plymouth and Suffolk are the same in geography and nomenclature as the respective counties, and the district attorneys for the Eastern, Middle, and Northern Districts are commonly known as the Essex County, Worcester County, and Middlesex County district attorneys, respectively.

== Historical counties ==
Eleven other historical counties have existed in Massachusetts, most becoming defunct when their lands were absorbed into the colony of New Hampshire or the state of Maine, both of which were created out of territory originally claimed by Massachusetts colonists. The oldest counties still in Massachusetts are Essex County, Middlesex County, and Suffolk County, created in 1643 with the original Norfolk County which was absorbed by New Hampshire and bears no relation to the modern Norfolk County. When these counties were created, they were a part of the Massachusetts Bay Colony, which would remain separate from the Plymouth Colony and that colony's counties until 1691. Hampden County, created in 1812, is the most recently created county still in Massachusetts, although Penobscot County, Maine bore that distinction until Maine broke off from Massachusetts in 1820. The majority of Massachusetts counties are named in honor of English place names, reflecting Massachusetts' colonial heritage.

== Shire town ==
The term shire town is the statutory term for the Massachusetts town having a county court and administration offices; a county can have multiple shire towns. County seat is the standard term used in general communications by the Massachusetts government.

== FIPS code ==
The Federal Information Processing Standard (FIPS) code, used by the United States government to uniquely identify counties, is provided with each entry. FIPS codes are five-digit numbers; for Massachusetts the codes start with 25 and are completed with the three-digit county code. The FIPS code for each county in the table links to census data for that county.

== List of current counties ==
County	FIPS code	County seat	Est.	Origin	Etymology	Density	Population	Area	Map
Barnstable County	001	Barnstable	June 2, 1685	One of three original counties created in the Plymouth Colony	After its county seat of Barnstable, which is named after the English town of Barnstaple	589.7/sq mi (227.7/km^{2})	233,539	396 sq mi (1,026 km^{2})	State map highlighting Barnstable County
Berkshire County	003	Pittsfield	June 30, 1761	From part of Hampshire County. Government abolished in 2000.	For the English county of Berkshire	137.7/sq mi (53.2/km^{2})	128,224	931 sq mi (2,411 km^{2})	State map highlighting Berkshire County
Bristol County	005	Taunton	June 2, 1685	One of three original counties created in the Plymouth Colony	For its original county seat of Bristol, Massachusetts, which is named for the English port city of Bristol – when the Town of Bristol joined Rhode Island, the name of the county was kept	1,067.7/sq mi (412.2/km^{2})	593,640	556 sq mi (1,440 km^{2})	State map highlighting Bristol County
Dukes County	007	Edgartown	June 22, 1695	From Martha's Vineyard and the Elizabeth Islands, which had been part of Dukes County, New York until Massachusetts gained it in 1691	Formerly a part of Dukes County, New York until 1691, the land at one time was the possession of the Duke of York	204.0/sq mi (78.8/km^{2})	21,219	104 sq mi (269 km^{2})	State map highlighting Dukes County
Essex County	009	Salem, Lawrence	May 10, 1643	One of four original counties created in the Massachusetts Bay Colony. Government abolished in 1999.	For the English county of Essex	1,659.9/sq mi (640.9/km^{2})	826,653	498 sq mi (1,290 km^{2})	State map highlighting Essex County
Franklin County	011	Greenfield	December 2, 1811	From part of Hampshire County. Government abolished in 1997.	For Benjamin Franklin (1706–1790), early American scientist, diplomat, and politician	100.7/sq mi (38.9/km^{2})	70,698	702 sq mi (1,818 km^{2})	State map highlighting Franklin County
Hampden County	013	Springfield	August 1, 1812	From part of Hampshire County. Government abolished in 1998.	John Hampden (1595—1643), the famous 17th century English parliamentarian	751.4/sq mi (290.1/km^{2})	464,338	618 sq mi (1,601 km^{2})	State map highlighting Hampden County
Hampshire County	015	Northampton	May 7, 1662	From unorganized territory in the western part of the Massachusetts Bay Colony. Government abolished 1999.	For the English county of Hampshire	310.1/sq mi (119.7/km^{2})	164,065	529 sq mi (1,370 km^{2})	State map highlighting Hampshire County
Middlesex County	017	Lowell, Cambridge	May 10, 1643	One of four original counties created in the Massachusetts Bay Colony. Government abolished in 1997.	For the English county of Middlesex	2,026.7/sq mi (782.5/km^{2})	1,669,979	824 sq mi (2,134 km^{2})	State map highlighting Middlesex County
Nantucket County	019	Nantucket	June 22, 1695	From Nantucket Island which had been part of Dukes County, New York until Massachusetts gained it in 1691.	The Town of Nantucket, itself derived from a Wampanoag word meaning "place of peace"	307.5/sq mi (118.7/km^{2})	14,758	48 sq mi (124 km^{2})	State map highlighting Nantucket County
Norfolk County	021	Dedham	June 20, 1793	From part of Suffolk County.	For the English county of Norfolk	1,849.4/sq mi (714.1/km^{2})	739,749	400 sq mi (1,036 km^{2})	State map highlighting Norfolk County
Plymouth County	023	Brockton, Plymouth	June 2, 1685	One of three original counties created in the Plymouth Colony.	For its seat of Plymouth, which is named for the English port city of Plymouth	827.3/sq mi (319.4/km^{2})	546,829	661 sq mi (1,712 km^{2})	State map highlighting Plymouth County
Suffolk County	025	Boston	May 10, 1643	One of four original counties created in the Massachusetts Bay Colony. Government abolished in 1999.	For the English county of Suffolk	13,653.3/sq mi (5,271.6/km^{2})	791,891	58 sq mi (150 km^{2})	State map highlighting Suffolk County
Worcester County	027	Worcester	July 10, 1731	From parts of Hampshire County, Middlesex County and Suffolk County. Government abolished in 1998.	For its county seat of Worcester, which is named in honor of the English city of Worcester and the English Civil War Battle of Worcester in 1651, a Parliamentarian victory	587.2/sq mi (226.7/km^{2})	888,502	1,513 sq mi (3,919 km^{2})	State map highlighting Worcester County

== Racial / Ethnic Profile of counties in Massachusetts (2020 Census) ==
Racial / Ethnic Profile of counties in Massachusetts (2020 Census)
Following is a table of counties in Massachusetts by race/ethnicity. The majority racial/ethnic group is coded per the key below.

Majority minority with no dominant group
Majority White
Majority Black
Majority Hispanic
Majority Asian
Majority Native American

Racial and ethnic composition of counties in Massachusetts (2020 Census) (NH = Non-Hispanic) Note: the US Census treats Hispanic/Latino as an ethnic category. This table excludes Latinos from the racial categories and assigns them to a separate category. Hispanics/Latinos may be of any race.
County	Location of County	Total Population	White alone (NH)	%	Black or African American alone (NH)	%	Native American or Alaska Native alone (NH)	%	Asian alone (NH)	%	Pacific Islander alone (NH)	%	Other race alone (NH)	%	Mixed race or Multiracial (NH)	%	Hispanic or Latino (any race)	%
Barnstable		228,996	194,561	84.96%	6,409	2.80%	1,092	0.48%	3,183	1.39%	65	0.03%	3,448	1.51%	12,330	5.38%	7,908	3.45%
Berkshire		129,026	109,263	84.68%	4,064	3.15%	165	0.13%	1,999	1.55%	18	0.01%	632	0.49%	5,821	4.51%	7,064	5.47%
Bristol		579,200	445,658	76.94%	23,123	3.99%	938	0.16%	13,651	2.36%	102	0.02%	8,730	1.51%	32,247	5.57%	54,751	9.45%
Dukes		20,600	16,230	78.79%	795	3.86%	202	0.98%	184	0.89%	9	0.04%	701	3.40%	1,945	9.44%	534	2.59%
Essex		809,829	536,424	66.24%	27,081	3.34%	782	0.10%	29,302	3.62%	130	0.02%	6,788	0.84%	26,475	3.27%	182,847	22.58%
Franklin		71,029	61,464	86.53%	963	1.36%	121	0.17%	1,186	1.67%	10	0.01%	362	0.51%	3,331	4.69%	3,592	5.06%
Hampden		465,825	278,464	59.78%	35,988	7.73%	659	0.14%	12,110	2.60%	169	0.04%	1,945	0.42%	15,171	3.26%	121,319	26.04%
Hampshire		162,308	127,578	78.60%	4,360	2.69%	205	0.13%	10,740	6.62%	56	0.03%	723	0.45%	7,024	4.33%	11,622	7.16%
Middlesex		1,632,002	1,085,919	66.54%	80,996	4.96%	1,414	0.09%	209,632	12.85%	353	0.02%	28,194	1.73%	82,249	5.04%	143,245	8.78%
Nantucket		14,255	9,889	69.37%	1,006	7.06%	19	0.13%	263	1.84%	2	0.01%	149	1.05%	615	4.31%	2,312	16.22%
Norfolk		725,981	512,421	70.58%	49,311	6.79%	701	0.10%	88,240	12.15%	142	0.02%	7,344	1.01%	29,712	4.09%	38,110	5.25%
Plymouth		530,819	406,919	76.66%	43,482	8.19%	796	0.15%	7,693	1.45%	94	0.02%	11,966	2.25%	35,917	6.77%	23,952	4.51%
Suffolk		797,936	352,900	44.23%	135,255	16.95%	1,147	0.14%	80,607	10.10%	281	0.04%	11,702	1.47%	37,517	4.70%	178,527	22.37%
Worcester		862,111	611,207	70.90%	44,222	5.13%	1,146	0.13%	46,110	5.35%	176	0.02%	9,424	1.09%	37,924	4.40%	111,902	12.98%

== Former counties ==
County	Created	Abolished	Fate
Cumberland County	1760	1820	Transferred to Maine
Devonshire County	1674	1675	Abolished and then absorbed into Maine
Hancock County	1789	1820	Transferred to Maine
Kennebec County	1799	1820	Transferred to Maine
Lincoln County	1760	1820	Transferred to Maine
Norfolk County	1643	1679	Abolished – most of its territory was absorbed into New Hampshire; towns remaining in Massachusetts were absorbed into Essex County. One of four original counties created in the Massachusetts Bay Colony.
Oxford County	1805	1820	Transferred to Maine
Penobscot County	1816	1820	Transferred to Maine
Somerset County	1809	1820	Transferred to Maine
Washington County	1789	1820	Transferred to Maine
York County	1652	1820	Transferred to Maine – there were two periods when York County was abolished, 1664 to 1668 and 1680 to 1691

== See also ==
- Administrative divisions of Massachusetts
- List of Massachusetts locations by per capita income
- List of county courthouses in Massachusetts
- List of county seats in Massachusetts
