= Shepardsfield Plantation =

Coordinates: 44°11′53″N 70°24′23″W

Shepardsfield, Maine
- Town
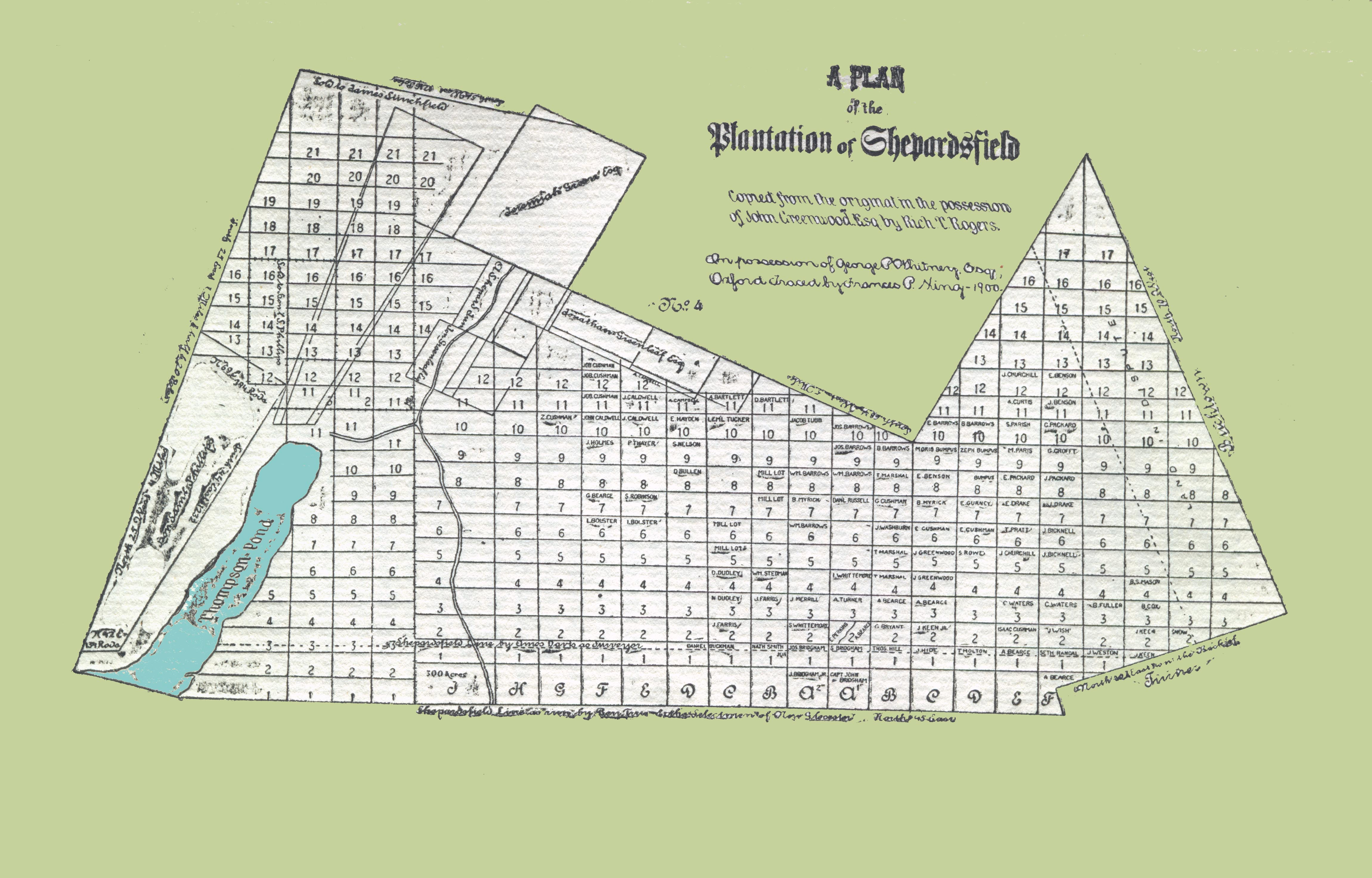
- Plan of Shepardsfield Plantation

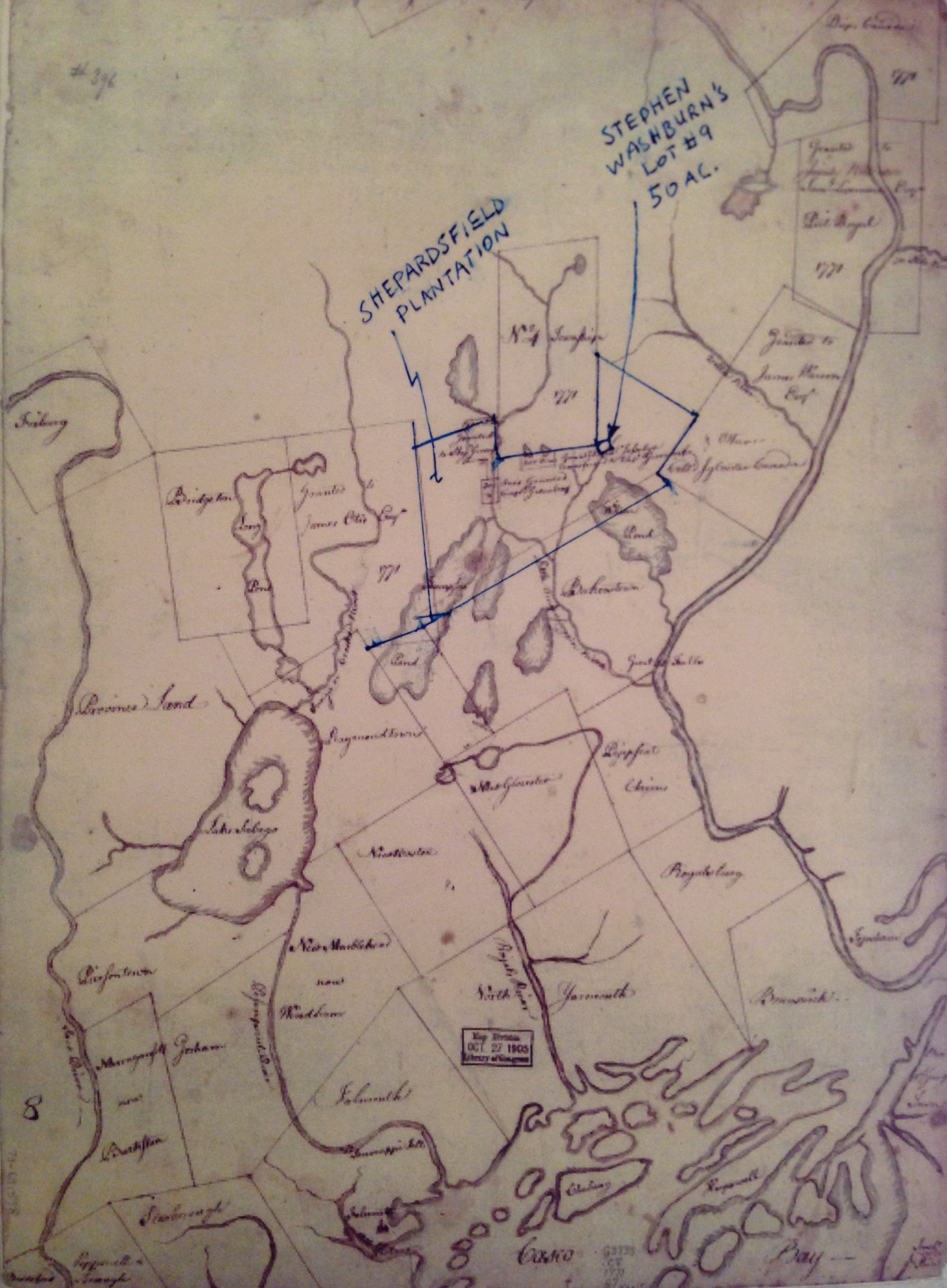
- Overlay of Shepardsfield on Old Map

- Location within the state of Maine
- Country: United States
- State: Maine
- County: Oxford
- Dissolved: 1792

Shepardsfield Plantation was a colonial town in Oxford County, District of Maine, United States. The town's history has always been interconnected with Hebron, Maine. The population was 528 at the 1790 census.

== History ==
It was granted on March 8, 1777, by the Massachusetts General Court to Alexander Shepard Jr. of Newton, Massachusetts as payment for a survey chart of the Maine coast that he had assisted making. It was named Shepardsfield Plantation, although early inhabitants called it Bog Brook Plantation. The first settlers were Capt. John Bridgham, Capt. Daniel Buckman, John Greenwood (step-son of Alexander Shepard), and Asa Bearce. Other families followed; John Washburn, Morris Bumpus, and William Barrows, to name a few. Shepardsfield was a wilderness with fresh pastures near streams and ponds. It offered prosperity to many soldiers and their families fresh from the battlefields of the Revolutionary War. The Shepardsfield petitioners were successful in part, as the plantation was incorporated as Hebron, the 78th town, March 6, 1792, but no reason appears for not complying with their request to name the town Columbia; perhaps the General Court had in view the making a modern "city of refuge"—a part of Hebron was set off and incorporated as the town of Oxford in 1829.

The tract of land granted by the General Court of Massachusetts to Alexander Shepard Jr., lies between 44° 3' and 44° 14' N latitude and between 6° 20' and 6° 40' E longitude from Washington. This territory being so nearly equidistant from the equator and the pole, is not subject to long continued or excessive heat or cold, and as the wind seldom comes from any one point for more than three or four days successively, the various climatic changes attendant upon the wind, follow one another in rapid and agreeable succession. The title of the Commonwealth to this district is based upon ancient grants "for the advancement of the Christian religion and the glory of God, and to replenish the deserts with people who would be governed by laws and the magistrates," from the crown of England, in exercise of the right of eminent domain. Unlike most legislative grant, this to Mr. Shepard was for a tangible consideration, as the following abstracts from the records of the Court will show.

RESOLVED, That there be granted to Alexander Shepard Jr. and to his heirs, the unappropriated lands lying in the county of Cumberland in the province of Maine, between a township of land granted to the Honorable James Warren Esq. and others, called Sylvester Canada; a township granted to Joshua Fuller and others, called No. 4; a township granted to the Honorable James Otis Esq. and others, and a township granted to Joseph Gerrish Esq. and others, called Bakerstown; containing about three square miles, exclusive of the allowances of ponds, rivers, sag of chain, etc., bounded as followeth, viz. beginning at a stake and stones in the line of Sylvester Canada aforesaid, near the bank of Little Wilson pond, thence north 70 degrees west to the line of No. 4 township on the south side of Streaked Mountain, thence on the line of said township to the south west corner thereof, thence on land granted to Jeremiah Green, to the north westerly corner of said grant, thence south westerly to the north east corner of the township aforesaid granted to the Honorable James Otis Esq., thence on the easterly line of said township to Bakerstown, thence on said Bakerstown north line to Sylvester Canada aforesaid, thence on Sylvester Canada line to the stake and stones first mentioned.

Provided, The said Alexander Shepard Jr. shall deliver in to this Court to their acceptance, on or before the last day of September next, an accurate map of all the late province of Maine, therein distinguishing the appropriated from the unappropriated lands, the lines of the several counties, all the rivers, distinguishing how far navigable, all the islands, towns, harbors, rocks, shoals, inlets, creeks, bays, lakes, promontories, capes, mountains, peninsulas, etc. in said Province. Provided, Also the said grantee settle ten families in said tract within ten years; and also that said tract doth not interfere with any former grant. March 7, 1777. Resolve accepting Mr. Shepard's map and confirming to him the grant of 1777, passed June 24, 1779.
