= Devonshire County, District of Maine, Massachusetts Bay Colony =

Coordinates: 44°06′14.3″N 69°23′10.8″W

Devonshire County, Massachusetts was a short-lived county formed in 1674 during colonial territorial disputes between the Massachusetts Bay Colony and the Province of New York. The county existed from 1674 to 1675, and encompassed land claimed by Massachusetts between the Kennebec River and Penobscot Bay in what is now Maine. This overlapped the New York claim, which extended from the Kennebec to the Saint Croix River (Maine's present easternmost boundary). Settlements in the territory were attacked during King Philip's War (1675-1676) and the area was abandoned until the 18th century. It was incorporated into the Province of Massachusetts Bay in 1692, which initially governed it as part of York County. The area is now divided into a number of Maine counties.
