= District of Maine =

Former territory of Massachusetts, now the State of Maine

Coordinates: 45.5°N 69°W

- Part of Massachusetts
- 1780–1820
- History
  - Established: October 25, 1780
  - British occupation of the east: September 1814–February 1815
  - Missouri Compromise: March 6, 1820
  - Statehood: March 15, 1820
Preceded by	Succeeded by
York County, Massachusetts	Maine
- Today part of: Maine

The District of Maine was the governmental designation for what is now the U.S. state of Maine from October 25, 1780, to March 15, 1820, when it was admitted to the Union as the 23rd state. The district was a part of the Commonwealth of Massachusetts and before American independence had been part of the British province of Massachusetts Bay.

== Colonial history ==
Historical population
Year	Pop.	±%
1760	20,000	—
1770	31,257	+56.3%
1780	49,138	+57.2%
1790	96,540	+96.5%
1800	151,719	+57.2%
1810	228,705	+50.7%
1820	298,335	+30.4%
Source: 1760–1780; 1790–1820

Originally settled in 1607 by the Plymouth Company, the coastal area between the Merrimack and Kennebec rivers, as well as an irregular parcel of land between the headwaters of the two rivers, became the province of Maine in a 1622 land grant. In 1629, the land was split, creating an area between the Piscataqua and Merrimack rivers which became the province of New Hampshire. It existed through a series of land patents made by the kings of England during this era, and included New Somersetshire, Lygonia, and Falmouth. The province was incorporated into the Massachusetts Bay Colony during the 1650s, beginning with the formation of York County, Massachusetts, which extended from the Piscataqua River to just east of the mouth of the Presumpscot River in Casco Bay. Eventually, its territory grew to encompass nearly all of present-day Maine. The large size of the county led to its division in 1760 through the creation of Cumberland and Lincoln counties.

The northeastern portion of present-day Maine was first sparsely occupied by Maliseet Indians and French settlers from Acadia. The lands between the Kennebec and Saint Croix rivers were granted to the Duke of York in 1664, who had them administered as Cornwall County, part of his proprietary Province of New York. In 1688, these lands (along with the rest of New York) were subsumed into the Dominion of New England. English and French claims in western Maine would be contested until the British conquest of New France during the French and Indian War. With the creation of the Province of Massachusetts Bay in 1692, the entirety of what is now Maine became part of that province.

== District history ==
When Massachusetts adopted its state constitution in 1780, it created the District of Maine to manage its northernmost counties, bounded on the west by the Piscataqua River and on the east by the Saint Croix River. By 1820, the District had been further subdivided with the creation of Hancock, Kennebec, Oxford, Penobscot, Somerset, and Washington counties.

A movement for Maine statehood began as early as 1785, and in the following years, several conventions were held to effect this. Starting in 1792, five popular votes were taken but all failed to reach the necessary majorities. During the War of 1812, British and Canadian forces occupied a large portion of Maine including everything from the Penobscot River east to the New Brunswick border with the goal of annexing them to Canada as the Colony of New Ireland. A weak response by Massachusetts to this occupation and possible British annexation contributed to increased calls in the district for statehood.

== Statehood ==
Results by county Statehood: 50–60%; 60–70%; 70–80%; 80–90%

The Massachusetts General Court passed enabling legislation on June 19, 1819, separating the District of Maine from the rest of the Commonwealth. The following month, on July 19, voters in the district approved statehood by 17,091 to 7,132.

County	For statehood		For status quo	
County	Votes	PCT	Votes	PCT
Cumberland	3,315	70.4%	1,394	29.6%
Hancock	820	51.9%	761	48.1%
Kennebec	3,950	86.0%	641	14.0%
Lincoln	2,523	62.2%	1,534	37.8%
Oxford	1,893	77.5%	550	22.5%
Penobscot	584	71.7%	231	28.3%
Somerset	1,440	85.9%	237	14.1%
Washington	480	77.7%	138	22.3%
York	2,086	55.9%	1,646	44.1%
Total:	17,091	70.6%	7,132	29.4%

The results of the election were presented to the Massachusetts Governor's Council on August 24, 1819. The Maine Constitution was unanimously approved by the 210 delegates to the Maine Constitutional Convention in October 1819. On February 25, 1820, the General Court passed a follow-up measure officially accepting the fact of Maine's imminent statehood.

At the time of Maine’s request for statehood, there were an equal number of free and slave states. Pro-slavery members of the United States Congress saw the admission of another free state, Maine, as a threat to the balance between slave and free states. They would support statehood for Maine only if Missouri Territory, where slavery was legal, would be admitted to the Union as a slave state. Maine became the nation's 23rd state on March 15, 1820, following the Missouri Compromise, which allowed Missouri to enter the Union as a slave-holding state and Maine as a free state.
