= The Duke's Laws =

Early laws in the Colony of New York

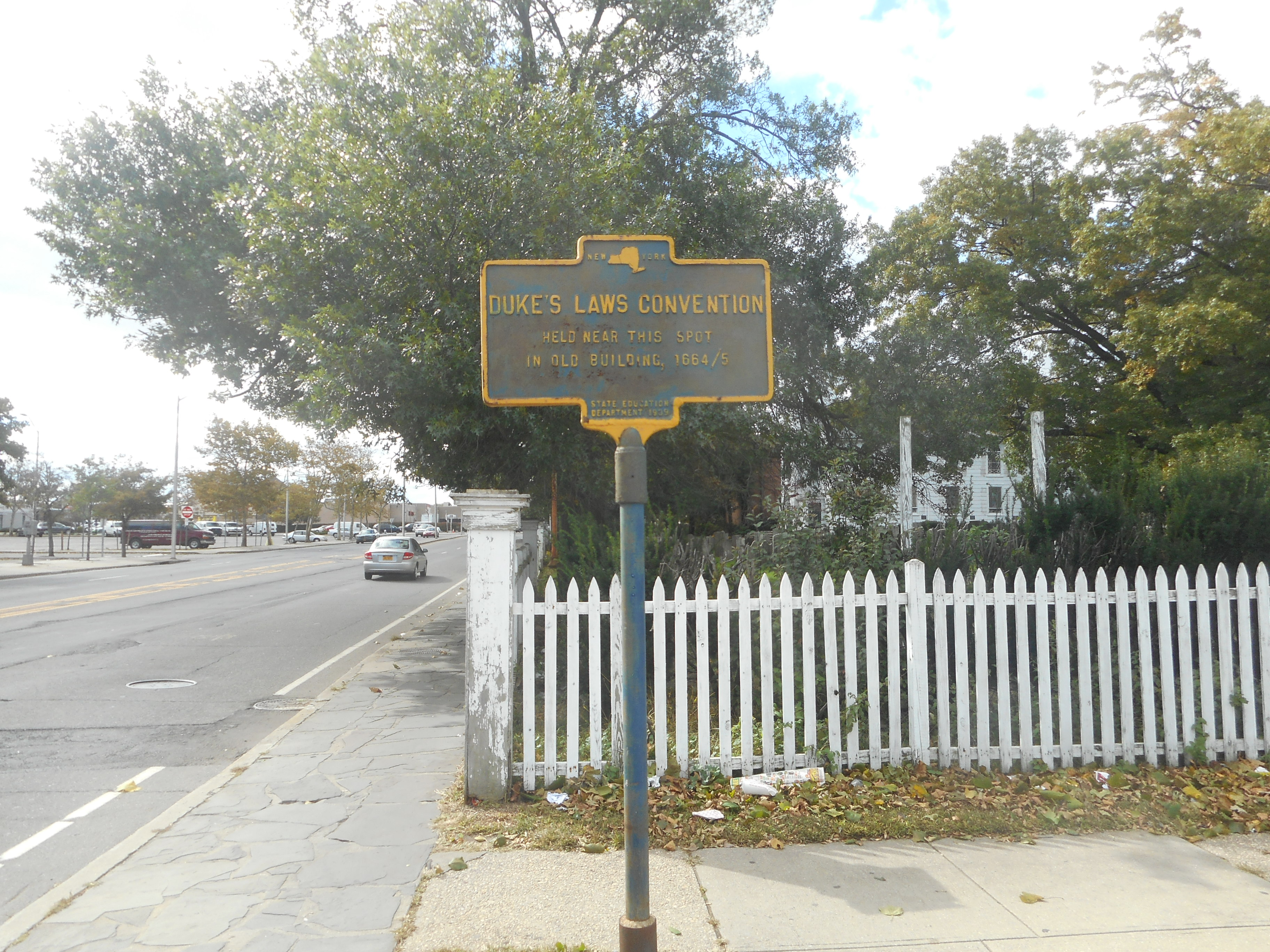
A New York State Historical Marker commemorating the 1664-1665 Duke's Laws Convention in Hempstead, New York.

The Duke of York's Laws for the Government of the Colony of New York were a set of guidelines laid out during the early years of English rule in the Colony of New York. They were promulgated by the governor, on behalf of the then Duke of York, in Hempstead on Long Island in 1665.

== Context ==
In March 1665, Governor Richard Nicolls convened a convention at Hempstead, Long Island to draft legislation for the colony. The code of laws was introduced into Yorkshire which included Long Island, Staten Island, Manhattan Island, and the east side of the Hudson River coterminous with Westchester. The change was made much more slowly in the Dutch areas, where certain concessions had been agreed to under the Articles of Capitulation.

== Content ==
The Duke's Laws covered nearly every facet of life in the colony and were published in alphabetical order—from how arrests were to be carried out, how juries were to be picked, to the amount of the bounty paid for dead wolves.

Although directed to English and Dutch colonists, the laws also covered what Indians could and could not do. For example, Indians were required to fence in their corn fields and were specifically barred from practicing their own religion. "No Indian whatsoever shall at any time be suffered to powaw or performe outward worship to the Devil in any Towne within this Government," one section of the laws said.

There are detailed instructions of how churches were to be managed. For instance, a church was to be built in each community, capable of holding 200 people; ministers would have to present their credentials to the government to prove they were not "ignorant pretenders to the Ministry." The minister would be required to preach "constantly every Sunday and shall also pray for the King, Queene, Duke of York and the Royall Family."

Under the laws, a person, "either Christian or Indean," who kills a wolf would receive a payment by bringing the head to a constable. The payment would be "to the value of an Indean coat."

The laws set out rules by which a person could be arrested. For instance, a person could not be arrested on the sabbath. Jurors were to be paid "three shillings six pence per diem."

One provision states, "If any man lyeth with mankind as he lyeth with a woman, they shall be put to Death, unless the one party were Forced or be under fourteen Years of age, in which Case he shall be punished at the Discretion of the Court of Assizes."

The laws also required marks, or brands, for horses in each town. Letters were designated in geographic order from east to west: A for East Hampton, B for Southampton, C for Southold, D for Seatalcott (Setauket), E for Huntington, F for Oyster Bay, G for Hempsteed, H for Jamaica, I for Flushing, K for West Chester, L for New Towne, M for Bushwick, N for Brookland, O for Flat Bush, P for Flat Land, Q for Utricht, and R for Gravesend. The letters are still in the seals of Huntington and Brookhaven, which uses Setauket's D.
