= York County, Massachusetts =

Former county in Massachusetts, United States

Historical population
Year	Pop.	±%
1650	1,000	—
1760	20,000	+1900.0%
Source: 1650 & 1760

Yorkshire County, Massachusetts was a county in what is now the U.S. state of Maine.

Yorkshire County was established in 1652 to include the area of the proprietary province of Lygonia when the Massachusetts Bay Colony first asserted territorial claims over the settlements in the southern parts of the Province of Maine, extending from the Piscataqua River to just east of the mouth of the Presumpscot River in Casco Bay. The county eventually grew to encompass effectively all of present-day State of Maine, although the interior was claimed by various Abenaki peoples, and the territory east of Penobscot Bay was claimed (and partly occupied) as part of French Acadia. Massachusetts Bay Colony renamed Yorkshire County, Massachusetts to York County, Massachusetts in 1668. However, the land east of the Kennebec River was claimed and sometimes administered as Cornwall County, Province of New York from September 5, 1665. It was temporarily turned over to the newly established Dominion of New England in 1687 until 1689 when the D.N.E. was disestablished. By 1760, most of the Abenaki had either been wiped out or retreated northward toward the Saint Lawrence River, and New France had been conquered in the French and Indian War.

The large size of the county led to its division in 1760, with Cumberland and Lincoln counties carved out of its eastern portions.

== Formation with Maine ==
When the 1780 Constitution of Massachusetts was adopted, the state created the District of Maine to manage its eastern territories. In 1805, the northern portion of York County was separated to form part of Oxford County.

When Maine achieved statehood in 1820, all of the counties of the District of Maine became counties of Maine. The remainder of York County became York County, Maine.
