= Cornwall County, Province of New York =

Former county of New York

Cornwall County was a county of the former Province of New York, established on September 5, 1665 from 25,100 square miles (65,000 km^{2}) of land that had been granted to the Duke of York in modern Maine. As established, the grant ran all the way from the St. Lawrence River to the Atlantic Ocean, between the Kennebec and St. Croix rivers, and produced what today is most of Aroostook, Piscataquis, Washington, Hancock, Penobscot, Waldo, Knox, Lincoln, Kennebec, Somerset, and Sagadahoc counties.

== History ==
On October 7, 1673, Massachusetts, relying on a new survey of its northern border, and responding to the Dutch capture of New York in August 1673 as a result of the Third Anglo-Dutch War, claimed 200 square miles (500 km^{2}) of the Duke of York's territory east of the Kennebec River in present-day Maine, including the Pemaquid settlement, and established a new county there. On May 27, 1674, this county was named Devonshire. Cornwall was implicitly reduced to the area north of the Massachusetts claim. Cornwall and Devonshire were lost to the Abenaki Indians in King Philip's War in the Autumn of 1675. Cornwall County was recreated on November 1, 1683, conforming to the original grant, still part of New York. Cornwall continued unchanged until the Spring of 1687, when it was transferred to the expanded Dominion of New England, extinguishing New York's claim to the land. Cornwall County was transferred from New England to Massachusetts in 1692 and called Yorkshire. Much of this region became part of Maine when it was split from Massachusetts in 1820.

== See also ==
- List of New York counties
- List of former United States counties
