= Politics of New York =

Politics of New York may refer to:

- Politics of New York City
- Politics of New York (state)
