= List of counties in Maine =

Counties of Maine
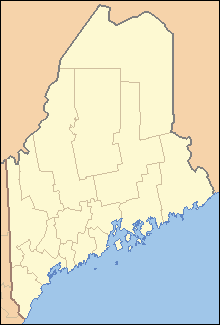
- Location: State of Maine
- Number: 16
- Populations: 17,409 (Piscataquis) – 317,222 (Cumberland)
- Areas: 370 square miles (960 km^{2}) (Sagadahoc) – 6,829 square miles (17,690 km^{2}) (Aroostook)
- Government: County government
- Subdivisions: Cities, towns, plantations, unincorporated territories, census-designated places, Indian reservations

The U.S. state of Maine has sixteen counties. Before statehood, Maine was officially part of the state of Massachusetts and was called the District of Maine. Maine was granted statehood on March 15, 1820, as part of the Missouri Compromise. Nine of the 16 counties had their borders defined while Maine was still part of Massachusetts, and hence are older than the state itself. Even after 1820, the exact location of the northern border of Maine was disputed with Britain, until the question was settled and the northern counties assumed their final official form, the Webster–Ashburton Treaty, signed in 1842. Almost all of Aroostook County was disputed land until the treaty was signed.

Maine counties have some law enforcement, run short-term jails, and maintain roads in areas lacking local government. The U.S. Census Bureau states "The counties are responsible for only limited functions in Maine".

The first county to be created was York County, created as York County, Massachusetts, by the government of the Massachusetts Bay Colony in 1652 to govern territories it claimed in southern Maine. No new counties have been created since 1860, when Knox County and Sagadahoc County were created. The most populous counties tend to be located in the southeastern portion of the state, along the Atlantic seaboard. The largest counties in terms of land area are inland and further north. Maine's county names come from a mix of British, American, and Native American sources, reflecting Maine's pre-colonial, colonial, and national heritage.

The Federal Information Processing Standard (FIPS) code, which is used by the United States government to uniquely identify states and counties, is provided with each entry. Maine's code is 23, which when combined with any county code would be written as 23XXX. The FIPS code for each county links to census data for that county.

== Alphabetical list ==
County	FIPS code	Seat	Est.	Origin	Etymology	Population	Area	Map
Androscoggin County	001	Auburn	March 31, 1854	From parts of Cumberland County, Kennebec County, and Lincoln County	The Androscoggin Native American tribe.	116,487	497 sq mi (1,287 km^{2})	State map highlighting Androscoggin County
Aroostook County	003	Houlton	May 1, 1839	From parts of Penobscot County, and Washington County	A Mi'kmaq word meaning beautiful river.	66,609	6,829 sq mi (17,687 km^{2})	State map highlighting Aroostook County
Cumberland County	005	Portland	November 1, 1760	As Cumberland County, Massachusetts, from part of York County	Prince William Augustus, Duke of Cumberland, son of George II of Great Britain.	317,222	1,217 sq mi (3,152 km^{2})	State map highlighting Cumberland County
Franklin County	007	Farmington	May 9, 1838	From parts of Kennebec County, Oxford County, and Somerset County	Benjamin Franklin, the Founding Father, scientist, printer, and diplomat.	30,824	1,744 sq mi (4,517 km^{2})	State map highlighting Franklin County
Hancock County	009	Ellsworth	May 1, 1790	As Hancock County, Massachusetts, from part of Lincoln County	John Hancock (1737–1793), the Founding Father and president of the convention that produced the United States Declaration of Independence.	57,171	2,351 sq mi (6,089 km^{2})	State map highlighting Hancock County
Kennebec County	011	Augusta	February 20, 1799	As Kennebec County, Massachusetts, from part of Lincoln County	The Kennebec River in Maine.	129,067	951 sq mi (2,463 km^{2})	State map highlighting Kennebec County
Knox County	013	Rockland	April 1, 1860	From parts of Lincoln County and Waldo County	Henry Knox (1750–1806), the first United States Secretary of War (1789 - 1794), who lived in Thomaston, Maine.	41,117	1,142 sq mi (2,958 km^{2})	State map highlighting Knox County
Lincoln County	015	Wiscasset	November 1, 1760	As Lincoln County, Massachusetts, from part of York County	The city of Lincoln, England.	36,595	700 sq mi (1,813 km^{2})	State map highlighting Lincoln County
Oxford County	017	Paris	March 4, 1805	As Oxford County, Massachusetts, from parts of Cumberland County and York County	Probably named for Oxford, Massachusetts.	60,346	2,175 sq mi (5,633 km^{2})	State map highlighting Oxford County
Penobscot County	019	Bangor	February 15, 1816	As Penobscot County, Massachusetts, from part of Hancock County	The Penobscot Native American tribe.	157,967	3,556 sq mi (9,210 km^{2})	State map highlighting Penobscot County
Piscataquis County	021	Dover-Foxcroft	April 30, 1838	From parts of Penobscot County and Somerset County	An Abenaki word meaning rapid waters.	17,409	4,377 sq mi (11,336 km^{2})	State map highlighting Piscataquis County
Sagadahoc County	023	Bath	April 4, 1854	From part of Lincoln County	An Abenaki word meaning mouth of big river.	37,979	370 sq mi (958 km^{2})	State map highlighting Sagadahoc County
Somerset County	025	Skowhegan	June 1, 1809	As Somerset County, Massachusetts, from parts of Kennebec County	The county of Somerset in England.	51,620	4,095 sq mi (10,606 km^{2})	State map highlighting Somerset County
Waldo County	027	Belfast	July 3, 1827	From parts of Hancock County, Kennebec County and Lincoln County	Samuel Waldo, Maine landowner and a colonial soldier in the 1745 siege of Louisbourg.	40,693	853 sq mi (2,209 km^{2})	State map highlighting Waldo County
Washington County	029	Machias	May 1, 1790	As Washington County, Massachusetts, from part of Lincoln County	George Washington, the first President of the United States.	31,334	3,255 sq mi (8,430 km^{2})	State map highlighting Washington County
York County	031	Alfred	November 20, 1652	As Yorkshire County, Massachusetts, from the southern part of the District of Maine. Renamed York County by Massachusetts in 1668	York, England, the birthplace of Christopher Levett who first attempted to settle the area.	222,434	1,271 sq mi (3,292 km^{2})	State map highlighting York County

== Racial / Ethnic Profile of counties in Maine (2020 Census) ==
Racial / Ethnic Profile of counties in Maine (2020 Census)
Following is a table of counties in Maine by race/ethnicity. The majority racial/ethnic group is coded per the key below.

Majority minority with no dominant group
Majority White
Majority Black
Majority Hispanic
Majority Asian
Majority Native American

Racial and ethnic composition of counties in Maine (2020 Census) (NH = Non-Hispanic) Note: the US Census treats Hispanic/Latino as an ethnic category. This table excludes Latinos from the racial categories and assigns them to a separate category. Hispanics/Latinos may be of any race.
County	Location of County	Total Population	White alone (NH)	%	Black or African American alone (NH)	%	Native American or Alaska Native alone (NH)	%	Asian alone (NH)	%	Pacific Islander alone (NH)	%	Other race alone (NH)	%	Mixed race or Multiracial (NH)	%	Hispanic or Latino (any race)	%
Androscoggin		111,139	95,875	86.27%	6,436	5.79%	382	0.34%	895	0.81%	50	0.04%	376	0.34%	4,903	4.41%	2,222	2.00%
Aroostook		67,105	62,163	92.64%	423	0.63%	1,206	1.80%	392	0.58%	18	0.03%	131	0.20%	1,860	2.77%	912	1.36%
Cumberland		303,069	262,137	86.49%	11,925	3.93%	667	0.22%	7,167	2.36%	96	0.03%	1,169	0.39%	11,897	3.93%	8,011	2.64%
Franklin		29,456	27,211	92.38%	166	0.56%	73	0.25%	383	1.30%	23	0.08%	109	0.37%	1,084	3.68%	407	1.38%
Hancock		55,478	51,098	92.10%	351	0.63%	231	0.42%	560	1.01%	10	0.02%	219	0.39%	2,040	3.68%	969	1.75%
Kennebec		123,642	112,682	91.14%	850	0.69%	460	0.37%	1,215	0.98%	29	0.02%	385	0.31%	5,469	4.42%	2,552	2.06%
Knox		40,607	37,533	92.43%	256	0.63%	139	0.34%	250	0.62%	18	0.04%	144	0.35%	1,595	3.93%	672	1.65%
Lincoln		35,237	33,071	93.85%	156	0.44%	105	0.30%	227	0.64%	9	0.03%	97	0.28%	1,177	3.34%	395	1.12%
Oxford		57,777	53,456	92.52%	209	0.36%	187	0.32%	275	0.48%	16	0.03%	157	0.27%	2,612	4.52%	865	1.50%
Penobscot		152,199	138,306	90.87%	1,443	0.95%	1,349	0.89%	1,853	1.22%	37	0.02%	420	0.28%	6,076	3.99%	2,715	1.78%
Piscataquis		16,800	15,474	92.11%	57	0.34%	102	0.61%	120	0.71%	7	0.04%	66	0.39%	713	4.24%	261	1.55%
Sagadahoc		36,699	33,830	92.18%	295	0.80%	92	0.25%	247	0.67%	3	0.01%	116	0.32%	1,467	4.00%	649	1.77%
Somerset		50,477	46,914	92.94%	248	0.49%	213	0.42%	261	0.52%	14	0.03%	140	0.28%	2,031	4.02%	656	1.30%
Waldo		39,607	36,883	93.12%	135	0.34%	140	0.35%	200	0.50%	12	0.03%	134	0.34%	1,544	3.90%	559	1.41%
Washington		31,095	27,587	88.72%	156	0.50%	1,381	4.44%	121	0.39%	7	0.02%	86	0.28%	1,090	3.51%	667	2.15%
York		211,972	194,044	91.54%	2,009	0.95%	566	0.27%	2,502	1.18%	58	0.03%	681	0.32%	8,015	3.78%	4,097	1.93%
