= New York State City/County Management Association =

Association

The New York State City/County Management Association is an association in the U.S. state of New York of appointed chief executive officers and administrators, other appointed municipal officials, and educators which seeks to promote the improvement of local government and the quality of urban life. The organization promotes communications among its members by distribution of information and ideas, as well as through meetings and conferences. These methods promote effective management techniques, efficient delivery of services, and ways to serve communities best through the council-manager form of local government.

The Association's headquarters utilizes a web page to inform members of highlights of developments within the profession, articles of specific interest to municipal management, and key personnel changes in the state and throughout the nation.

The Association also runs an annual four-day spring conference with lectures, panel discussions, and workshops on local government concerns and issues. The organization's annual business meeting is conducted during the conference.

The Association's name prior to 1998 was the Municipal Management Association of New York State. Prior to 1976, it was the City Managers Association of New York State.
