= Province of New York =

British colony in North America (1664–1776)

- 1664–1783
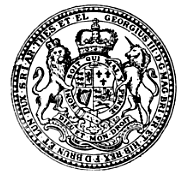
- Seal (1767)

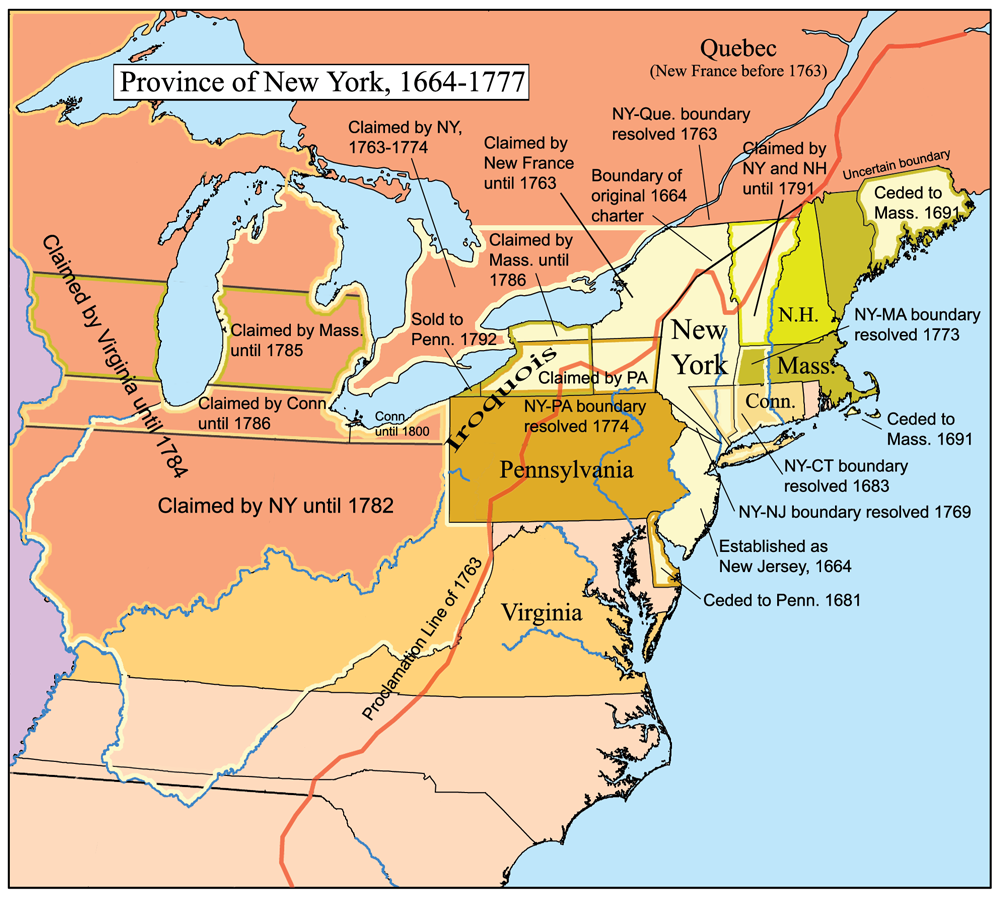
- Map of the Province of New York
- Status: Colony of England (1664‍–‍1707); Colony of Great Britain (1707‍–‍1783)
- Capital: New York City
- Official languages: English
- Minority languages: Dutch; Iroquoian languages; Algonquian languages
- Government: Proprietary colony (1664–1686); Crown colony (1689–1783)
- King
  - 1664–1685: Charles II (first)
  - 1760–1776: George III (last)
- Royal Governor
  - 1664–1668: Richard Nicolls (first)
  - 1783: Andrew Elliot (last)
- Legislature: Council (1664–1686, 1689–1775)
  - Upper house: New York Executive Council
  - Lower house: New York General Assembly
- History
  - Capture of New Amsterdam: 28 August 1664
  - Surrender of New Netherland: 29 September 1664
  - Treaty of Westminster: 5 March 1674
  - Declaration of Independence: 4 July 1776
  - Treaty of Paris: 3 September 1783
- Currency: New York pound
Preceded by	Succeeded by
New Netherland	New York; Vermont Republic

The Province of New York was a British proprietary colony and later a royal colony on the northeast coast of North America from 1664 to 1783. It extended from Long Island on the Atlantic, up the Hudson River and Mohawk River valleys to the Great Lakes and North to the colonies of New France and claimed lands further west.

In 1664, Charles II of England and his brother James, Duke of York raised a fleet to take the Dutch colony of New Netherland, then under the Directorship of Peter Stuyvesant. Stuyvesant surrendered to the English fleet without recognition from the Dutch West India Company. The province was renamed for the Duke of York, as its proprietor. England's rule was established de facto following military control in 1664, and became established de jure as sovereign rule in 1667 in the Treaty of Breda and the Treaty of Westminster (1674). It was not until 1674 that English common law was applied in the colony.

In the late 18th century, colonists in New York rebelled along with the other Thirteen Colonies, and supported the American Revolution that led to the founding of the United States. British claims in New York were ended by the 1783 Treaty of Paris, with New York establishing its independence from the British Crown. The final evacuation of New York City by the British Army was followed by the return of General George Washington's Continental Army on November 25, 1783, in a grand parade and celebration.

== Geography ==
This British crown colony was established from the former Haudenosaunee confederacy (also Iroquois), Lenape, and other indigenous lands, and then Dutch colony of New Netherland, with its core being York Shire, in what today is typically known as Downstate New York.

== History ==
=== New Amsterdam and Dutch Rule (1617-1664) ===
In 1617, officials of the Dutch West India Company in New Netherland created a settlement at present-day Albany, and in 1624 founded New Amsterdam, on Manhattan Island. The Dutch colony included claims to an area comprising all of the present U.S. states of New York, New Jersey, Delaware, and Vermont, along with inland portions of Connecticut, Massachusetts, and Maine in addition to eastern Pennsylvania.

=== Proprietary government (1664–1685) ===
New Amsterdam surrendered to Colonel Richard Nicholls on August 27, 1664; he renamed it New York. On September 24 Sir George Carteret accepted the capitulation of the garrison at Fort Orange, which he called Albany, after another of the Duke of York's titles. The capture was confirmed by the Treaty of Breda in July 1667.

Easing the transition to British rule, the Articles of Capitulation guaranteed certain rights to the Dutch; among these were: liberty of conscience in divine worship and church discipline, the continuation of their own customs concerning inheritances, and the application of Dutch law to bargains and contracts made prior to the capitulation.

In 1664, James, Duke of York, was granted a proprietary colony which included New Netherland and the Territory of Sagadahock in present-day eastern Maine. The New Netherland claim included western parts of present-day Massachusetts (to an extent that varied depending on whether the reference was the States General claim of all lands as far east as Narragansett Bay or the Treaty of Hartford negotiated by the English and Dutch colonies in 1650 but not recognized by either the Dutch or English governments) putting the new province in conflict with the Massachusetts charter. In general terms, the charter was equivalent to a conveyance of land conferring on him the right of possession, control, and government, subject only to the limitation that the government must be consistent with the laws of England. The Duke of York never visited his colony and exercised little direct control of it. He elected to administer his government through governors, councils, and other officers appointed by himself. No provision was made for an elected assembly.

Also in 1664, the Duke of York gave the part of his new possessions between the Hudson River and the Delaware River to Sir George Carteret in exchange for settlement of a debt. The territory was named after the Island of Jersey, Carteret's ancestral home. The other section of New Jersey was sold to Lord Berkeley of Stratton, who was a close friend of the Duke. As a result, Carteret and Berkeley became the two English Lords Proprietors of New Jersey. The Province of New Jersey was created, but the border was not finalized until 1765 (see New York-New Jersey Line War). In 1667, territories between the Byram River and Connecticut River were split off to become the western half of Connecticut.

The acquired territory land designations were reassigned by the crown, leaving the territory of the modern State of New York, including the valleys of the Hudson and Mohawk Rivers, and future Vermont. The territory of western New York was disputed with the indigenous Iroquois Confederacy, and also disputed between the English and the French from their northern colonial province of New France (modern eastern Canada). The province remained an important military and economic link to Canada throughout its history. Vermont was disputed with the Province of New Hampshire to the east.

The first governor Richard Nicolls was known for writing "The Duke's Laws" which served as the first compilation of English laws in colonial New York. Nicholls returned to England after an administration of three years, much of which was taken up in confirming the ancient Dutch land grants. Francis Lovelace was next appointed Governor and held the position from May 1667 until the return of the Dutch in July 1673. A Dutch fleet recaptured New York and held it until it was traded to the English by the Treaty of Westminster. A second grant was obtained by the Duke of York in July 1674 to perfect his title.

Upon conclusion of the peace in 1674, the Duke of York appointed Sir Edmund Andros as Governor of his territories in America. Governor Edmund Andros in 1674 said "permit all persons of what religion soever, quietly to inhabit within the precincts of your jurisdiction" Nonetheless, he made the Quakers of West Jersey pay toll on the Delaware, but they applied to England and were redressed. He was followed by Colonel Thomas Dongan in 1682. Dongan was empowered, on the advice of William Penn, to summon "...a general assembly of all the freeholders, by such persons they should choose to represent them to consult with you and said council what laws are fit and necessary to be made..."

A colonial Assembly was created in October 1683. New York was the last of the English colonies to have an assembly. The assembly passed the Province of New York constitution on October 30, the first of its kind in the colonies. This constitution gave New Yorkers more rights than any other group of colonists including the protection from taxation without representation. On November 1, 1683, the government was reorganized, and the state was divided into twelve counties, each of which was subdivided into towns. Ten of those counties still exist (see above), but two (Cornwall and Dukes) were in territory purchased by the Duke of York from the Earl of Stirling, and are no longer within the territory of the State of New York, having been transferred by treaty to Massachusetts. While the number of counties has been increased to 62, the pattern still remains that a town in New York State is a subdivision of a county, similar to New England.

An act of the assembly in 1683 naturalized all those of foreign nations then in the colony professing Christianity. To encourage immigration, it also provided that foreigners professing Christianity may, after their arrival, be naturalized if they took the oath of allegiance as required.

The Duke's Laws established a non-denominational state church.

The British replaced the Dutch in their alliance with the Iroquois against New France, with an agreement called the Covenant Chain.

The colony was one of the Middle Colonies, and ruled at first directly from England. When the Duke of York ascended to the throne of England as James II in 1685, the province became a royal colony.

=== Royal province (1686–1775) ===
In 1664, after the Dutch ceded New Netherland to Britain, it became a proprietary colony under James, Duke of York. When James ascended the throne in February 1685 and became King James II, his personally owned colony became a royal province.

In May 1688, the Province of New York was made part of the Dominion of New England. However, in April 1689, when news arrived that King James had been overthrown in the Glorious Revolution, Bostonians overthrew their government and imprisoned Dominion Governor Edmund Andros. The province of New York rebelled in May in what is known as Leisler's Rebellion. King William's War with France began during which the French attacked Schenectady. In July, New York participated in an abortive attack on Montreal and Quebec. A new governor Henry Sloughter arrived in March 1691. He had Jacob Leisler arrested, tried, and executed.

New York's charter was re-enacted in 1691 and was the constitution of the province until the creation of the State of New York.

The first newspaper to appear in New York was the New-York Gazette, started November 8, 1725, by William Bradford. It was printed on a single sheet, published weekly.

During Queen Anne's War with France from 1702 to 1713, the province had little involvement with the military operations, but benefited from being a supplier to the British fleet. New York militia participated in two abortive attacks on Quebec in 1709 and 1711.

==== Dutch ====
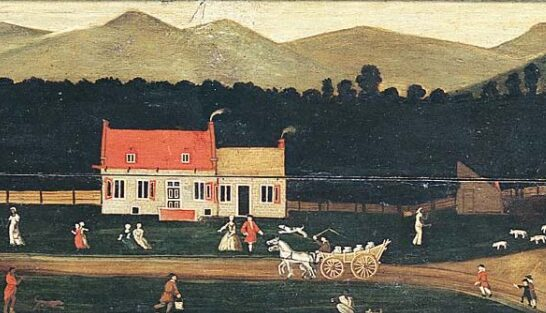
The Van Bergen farm near Albany, New York in 1733

When the British took over, the great majority of Dutch families remained, with the exception of government officials and soldiers. However, new Dutch arrivals became very few. While the Netherlands was a small country, the Dutch Empire was large, meaning that emigrants leaving the mother country had a wide variety of choices under full Dutch control. The major Dutch cities were centers of high culture, but they sent few immigrants. Most Dutch arrivals to the New World in the 17th century had been farmers from villages who on arrival in New Netherland scattered into widely separated villages that had little cross contact with each other. Even inside a settlement, different Dutch groups had minimal interaction.

With very few new arrivals, the result was an increasingly traditional system cut off from the forces for change. The folk maintained their popular culture, revolving around their language and their Calvinist religion. The Dutch brought along their own folklore, most famously Sinterklaas, which evolved into the modern day Santa Claus. They maintained their distinctive clothing and food preferences. They introduced some new foods to America, including beets, endive, spinach, parsley, and cookies. After the British takeover, rich Dutch families in Albany and New York City emulated the English elite, purchasing English furniture, silverware, crystal, and jewelry. They were proud of the Dutch language, which was strongly reinforced through the church, but were much slower than the Yankees in setting up schools for their children. They finally set up Queens College, which is now Rutgers University in New Brunswick, New Jersey. They published no newspapers, and published no books and only a handful of religious tracts annually.

==== Germans ====
Nearly 2,800 Palatine German emigrants were transported to New York by Queen Anne's government in ten ships in 1710, the largest single group of immigrants before the Revolutionary War. By comparison, Manhattan then had only 6,000 people. Initially, the Germans were employed in the production of naval stores and tar along the Hudson River near Peekskill. In 1723 they were allowed to settle in the central Mohawk Valley west of Schenectady as a buffer against the Native Americans and the French. They also settled in areas such as Schoharie and Cherry Valley. Many became tenant farmers or squatters. They kept to themselves, married their own, spoke German, attended Lutheran churches, and retained their own customs and foods. They emphasized farm ownership. Some mastered English to become conversant with local legal and business opportunities.

==== Black slaves ====
The first slaves were introduced to the colonies by the Dutch, and thereafter by the British, largely bought from African tribal chiefs who exploited prisoners taken during the numerous tribal wars of that period. In the 1690s, New York was the largest importer of the colonies of slaves and a supply port for pirates.

The black population became a major element in New York City, and on large upstate farms. With its shipping and trades, New York had use for skilled African labor as artisans and domestic servants. New York sold these slaves using slave markets, giving slaves to the highest bidder at an auction.

Two notable slave revolts occurred in New York in 1712 and 1741.

The numbers of slaves imported to New York increased dramatically from the 1720s through 1740s. By the 17th century, they established the African burial ground in Lower Manhattan, which was used through 1812. It was discovered nearly two centuries later during excavation before the construction of the Ted Weiss Federal Building at 290 Broadway. Historians estimated 15,000–20,000 Africans and African Americans had been buried in the approximately 8 acres surrounding there. Because of the extraordinary find, the government commissioned a memorial at the site, where the National Park Service has an interpretive center. It has been designated a National Historic Landmark and National Monument. Excavation and study of the remains has been described as the "most important historic urban archaeological project undertaken in the United States."

==== King George's War ====
This province, as a British colony, fought against the French during King George's War. The assembly was determined to control expenditures for this war and only weak support was given. When the call came for New York to help raise an expeditionary force against Louisburg, the New York assembly refused to raise troops and only appropriated a token £3,000. The assembly was opposed to a significant war effort because it would interrupt trade with Quebec and would result in higher taxes. The French raid on Saratoga in 1745 destroyed that settlement, killing and capturing more than one hundred people. After this attack the assembly was more generous and raised 1,600 men and £40,000.

==== French and Indian War ====
Upstate New York was the scene of fighting during the French and Indian War, with British and French forces contesting control of Lake Champlain in association with Native American allies. Sir William Johnson, 1st Baronet, and other agents in upstate New York brought about the participation of the Iroquois. The French and their Indian allies laid siege to Fort William Henry at the southern end of Lake George in 1757. The British forces surrendered to the French, but many prisoners were then massacred by the Indians. Some prisoners had smallpox, and when Indians took the scalps to their home villages, they spread a disease that killed large numbers. In the end the British won the war and took over all of Canada, thereby ending French-sponsored Indian attacks.

One of the largest impressment operations occurred in New York in the spring of 1757 when three thousand British troops cordoned off the city and impressed nearly eight hundred persons they found in taverns and other gathering places of sailors. New York was the centre for privateering. Forty New York ships were commissioned as privateers in 1756 and in the spring of 1757 it was estimated the value of French prizes brought into New York was two hundred thousand pounds. By 1759, the seas had been cleaned of French vessels and the privateers were diverted into trading with the enemy. The ending of the war caused a severe recession in New York.

Sir William Johnson, 1st Baronet, negotiated an end to Pontiac's Rebellion. He promoted the Proclamation of 1763 and the Treaty of Fort Stanwix to protect the Indians from further English settlement in their lands. The treaty established a boundary line along the West Branch Delaware River and the Unadilla River, with Iroquois lands to the west and colonial lands to the east.

=== Political parties ===
During the middle years of the 18th century, politics in New York revolved around the rivalry of two great families, the Livingstons and the De Lanceys. Both of these families had amassed considerable fortunes. New York City had an inordinate influence on New York province politics because several of the assembly members lived in New York City rather than in their district. In the 1752 election, De Lanceys' relatives and close friends controlled 12 of the 27 seats in the assembly. The De Lanceys lost control of the assembly in the election of 1761.

Governor Cadwallader Colden tried to organize a popular party to oppose the great families, thus earning the hatred of the city elite of both parties. The Livingstons looked to the imperial ties as a means of controlling the influence of James De Lancey. The De Lanceys regarded imperial ties to be a tool for personal advantage.

=== Stamp Act ===
Parliament passed the Stamp Act 1765 to raise money from the colonies. New York had previously passed its own stamp act from 1756 to 1760 to raise money for the French and Indian war. The extraordinary response to the Stamp Act can only be explained by the build-up of antagonisms on local issues. New York was experiencing a severe recession from the effects of the end of the French and Indian war. The colonies were experiencing the effects of a very tight monetary policy caused by the trade deficit with Britain, a fiscal crisis in Britain restricting credit, and the Currency Act, which prevented the issuing of paper currency to provide liquidity.

From the outset, New York led the protests in the colonies. Both New York political factions opposed the Stamp Act of 1765. In October, at what became Federal Hall in New York, representatives of several colonies met in the Stamp Act Congress to discuss their response. The New York assembly petitioned the British House of Commons on December 11, 1765, for the Americans' right of self taxation. In August, the intimidation and beating of stamp agents was widely reported. The New York stamp commissioner resigned his job.

The act went into effect on November 1. The day before, James De Lancey organized a meeting at Burns Tavern of New York merchants, where they agreed to boycott all British imports until the Stamp Act was repealed. A leading moderate group opposing the Stamp Act were the local Sons of Liberty headed by Isaac Sears, John Lamb and Alexander McDougall. Historian Gary B. Nash wrote of what was called the "General Terror of November 1–4":

But New York's plebeian element was not yet satisfied. Going beyond the respectable leaders of the Sons of Liberty, the lower orders rampaged through the town for four days. Some two thousand strong, they threatened the homes of suspected sympathizers of British policy, attacked the house of the famously wealthy governor Cadwallader Colden, paraded his effigy around town, and built a monstrous bonfire in the Bowling Green into which the shouting crowd hurled the governor's luxurious two sleighs and horse-drawn coach.

Historian Fred Anderson contrasted the mob actions in New York with those in Boston. In Boston, after the initial unrest, local leaders such as the Loyal Nine (a precursor to the Sons of Liberty) were able to take control of the mob. In New York, however, the "mob was largely made up of seamen, most of whom lacked deep community ties and felt little need to submit to the authority of the city's shorebound radical leaders." The New York Sons of Liberty did not take control of the opposition until after November 1.

On November 1st, the crowd destroyed a warehouse and the house of Thomas James, commander at Fort George. A few days later the stamps stored at Fort George were surrendered to the mob. Nash notes "whether the Sons of Liberty could control the mariners, lower artisans, and laborers remained in doubt," and "they came to fear the awful power of the assembled lower-class artisans and their maritime compatriots."

On January 7, 1766, the merchant ship Polly carrying stamps for Connecticut was boarded in New York Harbor and the stamps destroyed. Up to the end of 1765 the Stamp Act disturbances had largely been confined to New York City, but in January the Sons of Liberty also stopped the distribution of stamps in Albany.

In May 1766, when news arrived of the repeal of the Stamp Act the Sons of Liberty celebrated by the erection of a Liberty Pole. It became a rallying point for mass meetings and an emblem of the American cause. In June, two regiments of British regulars arrived in New York and were quartered in the upper barracks. These troops cut down the liberty pole on August 10. A second and third pole were erected and also cut down. A fourth pole was erected and encased in iron to prevent similar action.

In 1766, widespread tenant uprisings occurred in the countryside north of New York City centered on the Livingston estates. They marched on New York expecting the Sons of Liberty to support them. Instead, the Sons of Liberty blocked the roads and the leader of the tenants was convicted of treason.

=== Quartering Act ===
In the last years of the French and Indian War London approved a policy of keeping twenty regiments in the colonies to police and defend the back country. The enabling legislation took the form of the Quartering Act which required colonial legislatures to provide quarters and supplies for the troops. The Quartering Act stirred little controversy and New Yorkers were ambivalent about the presence of the troops. The assembly had provided barracks and provisions every year since 1761.

However, the tenant riots of 1766 showed the need for a police force in the colony. The Livingston-controlled New York assembly passed a quartering bill in 1766 to provide barracks and provisions in New York City and Albany which satisfied most, but not all of the requirements of the Quartering Act. London suspended the assembly for failure to comply fully, and Governor Moore dissolved the House of Assembly, February 6, 1768. The next month New Yorkers went to the polls for a new assembly. In this election, with the Sons of Liberty support, the De Lancey faction gained seats, but not enough for a majority.

=== Townshend Acts ===
In 1768, a letter issued by the Massachusetts assembly called for the universal boycott of British imports in opposition to the Townshend Acts. In October, the merchants of New York agreed on the condition that the merchants of Boston and Philadelphia also agreed. In December, the assembly passed a resolution which stated the colonies were entitled to self-taxation. Governor Moore declared the resolution repugnant to the laws of England and dissolved the assembly. The De Lancey faction, again with Sons of Liberty support, won a majority in the assembly.

In the spring of 1769, New York was in depression from the recall of the paper boycott and the British boycott. By the Currency Act New York was required to recall all paper money. London allowed the issuance of additional paper money, but the attached conditions were unsatisfactory. While New York was boycotting British imports, other colonies including Boston and Philadelphia were not. The De Lanceys tried to reach a compromise by passing a bill which allowed for the issuing of paper currency, of which half was for provisioning of the troops. Alexander McDougall, signed a 'Son of Liberty', issued a broadside entitled To the Betrayed Inhabitants of the City and Colony of New York which was an excellent piece of political propaganda denouncing the De Lanceys for betraying the liberties of the people by acknowledging the British power of taxation. The Sons of Liberty switched their allegiance from the De Lanceys to the Livingstons. Alexander McDougall was arrested for libel.

Conflict between the Sons of Liberty and the troops in New York erupted with the Battle of Golden Hill on January 19, 1770, where troops cut down the fourth Liberty Pole which had been erected in 1767.

In July 1770, the merchants of New York decided to resume trade with Britain when news arrived of Parliament's plan to repeal the Townshend Duties and to give permission for New York to issue some paper currency. The Sons of Liberty were strongly opposed to the resumption of trade. The merchants twice polled their members and went door to door polling residents of New York and all polls were overwhelming in support of resumption of trade. This was perhaps the first public opinion poll in American history.

=== Tea Act ===
New York was peaceful after the repeal of the Townshend Act, but the economy of New York was still in a slump. In May 1773 the Parliament passed the Tea Act cutting the duty on tea and enabling the East India company to sell tea in the colonies cheaper than the smugglers could. This act primarily hurt the New York merchants and smugglers. The Sons of Liberty were the organizers of the opposition and in November 1773 they published Association of the Sons of Liberty of New York in which anyone who assisted in support of the act would be an "enemy to the liberties of America". As a result, the New York East India agents resigned. The New York assembly took no action in regard to the Sons of Liberty assumption of extra-legal powers.

The New York City Sons of Liberty learned of Boston's plan to stop the unloading of any tea and resolved to also follow this policy. Since the Association had not obtained the support they had expected, the Sons of Liberty were afraid that if the tea was landed the population would demand its distribution for retail.

In December, news arrived of the Boston Tea Party strengthened opposition. In April 1774, The boat Nancy arrived in New York harbor for repairs. The captain admitted that he had 18 chests of tea on board and he agreed that he would not attempt to have the tea landed, but the Sons of Liberty boarded the ship regardless and destroyed the tea.

=== Intolerable Acts ===
In January 1774, the Assembly created a Committee of Correspondence to correspond with other colonies in regard to the Intolerable Acts.

In May 1774 news arrived of the Boston Port Act which closed the port of Boston. The Sons of Liberty were in favor of resumption of a trade boycott with Britain, but there was strong resistance from the large importers. In May, a meeting in New York was called in which members were selected for a Committee of Correspondence. The Committee of Fifty was formed which was dominated with moderates, the Sons of Liberty only obtained 15 members. Isaac Low was the chairman. Francis Lewis was added to create the Committee of Fifty-One. The group adopted a resolution which said Boston was "suffering in the defence of the rights of America" and proposed the formation of a Continental Congress. In July, the committee select five of their members as delegates to this congress. Some of the other counties also sent delegates to the First Continental Congress which was held in September. The New York delegates were unable to stop the adoption at the congress of the Continental Association. The association was generally ignored in New York.

In January and February 1775, of the New York Assembly voted down successive resolutions approving the proceedings of the First Continental Congress and refused to send delegates to the Second Continental Congress. New York was the only colonial assembly which did not approve the proceeds of the First Continental Congress. Opposition to the Congress revolved around the opinion that the provincial houses of assembly were the proper agencies to solicit redress for grievances. In March, the Assembly broke with the rest of the colonies and wrote a petition to London, but London rejected the petition because it contained claims about a lack of authority of the "parent state" to tax colonists, "which made it impossible" to accept. The Assembly last met on April 3, 1775.

=== Provincial Congress ===
The revolutionary New York Provincial Congress of local representatives assumed the government on May 22, 1775, declared the province the State of New York in 1776, and ratified the first New York Constitution in 1777. During the ensuing American Revolutionary War the British regained and occupied the strategic port and harbor of New York Town in September 1776, using it as its military and political base of operations in British North America; though a British governor was technically in office, much of the remainder of the upper part of the colony was held by the rebel Patriots.

In April 1775, the rebels formed the New York Provincial Congress as a replacement for the New York Assembly. News of the battle of Lexington and Concord reached New York on April 23, which stunned the city since there was a widely believed rumor that Parliament was to grant the colonies self-taxation. The Sons of Liberty led by Marinus Willett broke into the Arsenal at City Hall and removed 1,000 stand of arms. The armed citizens formed a voluntary corps to govern the city with Isaac Sears's house the de facto seat of government and militia headquarters. The crown-appointed New York executive council met on April 24 and concluded that "we were unanimously of the opinion that we had no power to do anything." The British troops in New York never left their barracks.

On October 19, 1775, Governor William Tryon was forced to leave New York for a British warship offshore, ending any appearances of British rule of the colony as the Continental Congress ordered the arrest of anyone endangering the safety of the colony. In April 1776 Tryon officially dissolved the New York assembly.

New York was located in the Northern theatre of the American Revolutionary War. New York served as the launching point for the failed Invasion of Canada in 1775, the first major military operation of the newly formed Continental Army. General George Washington took the Continental Army from Boston after the British withdrew following the Fortification of Dorchester Heights, and brought it to New York in 1776, correctly anticipating the British would return there. The Battle of Saratoga in th year 1777 was a turning point in the war. West Point on the Hudson was a strategic asset. And New York played a central role for the British in their attempt to divide New England from the rest of the colonies.

The Fourth Provincial Congress convened in White Plains on July Ninth, 1776, and became known as the New York First Constitutional Convention. New York endorsed the Declaration of Independence the same day, and declared the independent state of New York. New York celebrated by tearing down the statue of George III in Bowling Green. On July 10, 1776, the Fourth Provincial Congress changed its name to the Convention of Representatives of the State of New York, and "acts as legislature without an executive." While adjourned it left a Committee of Safety in charge. The New York state constitution was framed by a convention which assembled at White Plains on July 10, 1776, and after repeated adjournments and changes of venue, it concluded in Kingston, New York on Sunday evening, April 20, 1777, when the new constitution was adopted with one dissenting vote. It had been drafted by John Jay and was not submitted to the people for ratification. Under its provisions, the governor would be elected not appointed, voting restrictions were reduced, secret ballots were introduced, and civil rights were guaranteed. On July 30, 1777, George Clinton was inaugurated as the first Governor of New York colony at Kingston. On July 9, 1778, the State of New York signed the Articles of Confederation and officially became a part of the government of the United States of America, though it had been a part of the nation since it was declared in 1776 with signatories from New York.

The province was the scene of the largest battle of the entire war, and the first after the Declaration of Independence was signed. The British recaptured the city in September 1776 in the New York and New Jersey campaign, cut down the Liberty Pole in the common, and placed the province under martial law under the command of James Robertson, though his effective authority did not extend far beyond the southern tip of Manhattan (then the extent of New York City). Tryon retained his title of governor, but with little power. David Mathews was Mayor for the duration of British occupation of New York until Evacuation Day in 1783. After its reoccupation, New York became the headquarters for the British army in America, and the British political center of operations in North America. Loyalist refugees flooded into the city raising its population to 33,000. Prison ships in Wallabout Bay held a large proportion of American soldiers and sailors being held prisoner by the British, and was where more Americans died than in all of the battles of the war, combined. The British retained control of New York until Evacuation Day in November 1783, which was commemorated long afterward.

== Structure of government ==
The governor of New York was royally appointed. The governor selected his Executive Council which served as the upper house. The governor and king had veto power over the assembly's bills. However, all bills were effective until royal disapproval had occurred which could take up to a year. During King George's War, the governor approved two assembly initiatives; that the colony's revenue be approved annually rather than every five years and that the assembly must approve the purpose of each allocation. Elections to the house of assembly were initially held whenever the governor pleased, but eventually a law was passed requiring an election at least once every seven years. The city of New York was the seat of government and where the New York provincial assembly met.

Between 1692 and 1694 the governor of New York was also the governor of Pennsylvania. From 1698 to 1701 the governor was also the governor of Massachusetts and New Hampshire. From 1702 to 1738 he was also the governor of New Jersey.

Representation in the assembly in 1683 was six for Long Island, four for New York City, two for Kingston, two for Albany, one for each of Staten Island, Schenectady, Martha's Vineyard and Nantucket and one for Pemequid on the Maine coast. In 1737, the assembly was expanded to 27 and in 1773 to 31.

Voters were required to have a £40 freehold, in addition to requirements related to age, sex, and religion. The £40 freehold requirement was often ignored. Jews were not allowed to vote between 1737 and 1747. In rural counties slightly more than half the males could vote. No secret ballot safeguarded the independence of the voters. The elections were held at the county town, under the supervision of the sheriff and sometimes at such short notice that many of the voting population could not get to the polls. The candidates were usually at the polls and the vote was taken by a show of hands unless this vote did not result in a clear winner.

David Osborn notes,

The election for an open seat in the New York assembly, held on the Village Green in Eastchester, Westchester County on October 29, 1733, is one of the better known political events in colonial America. Two hundred and seventy-five years after the contest, historians continue to cite the election to advance various arguments about colonial life. One recent student used the election to argue for the persistent importance of monarchy in the outlook of colonists, while another scholar treated the voting as an important point in the development of political awareness among New York artisans. Many writers address the election, held at what is today St. Paul's Church National Historic Site, in Mt. Vernon, as part of the story of the printer John Peter Zenger, whose acquittal in a seditious libel case in 1735 is seen as a foundation of the free press in America. The first issue of Zenger's New York Weekly Journal carried a lengthy report on the famous election, producing one of the few complete accounts of a colonial election available to historians."

List of governors

See List of colonial governors of New York

List of attorneys general

See List of attorneys general of the Province of New York

=== Counties ===
The Province of New York was divided into twelve counties on November 1, 1683, by the Royal Governor Thomas Dongan:

- Albany County: all of the region that is now northern and western New York. Also claimed the area, later disputed, that is now Vermont. In addition, as there was no fixed western border to the colony (a sea-to-sea grant), Albany County technically extended to the Pacific Ocean. Most of this land, which was Indian land for most of the province's history, has now been ceded to other states and most of the land within New York has been divided into new counties.
- Cornwall County: that part of Maine between the Kennebec River and the St. Croix River from the Atlantic Ocean to the St. Lawrence River. Ceded to the Province of Massachusetts Bay in 1692.
- Dukes County: the Elizabeth Islands, Martha's Vineyard and Nantucket Island east of Long Island. Ceded to Massachusetts in 1692.
- Dutchess County: now Dutchess and Putnam counties.
- Kings County: the current Kings County; Brooklyn.
- New York County: the current New York County; Manhattan.
- Orange County: now Orange and Rockland counties.
- Queens County: now Queens and Nassau counties.
- Richmond County: the current Richmond County; Staten Island.
- Suffolk County: the current Suffolk County.
- Ulster County: now Ulster and Sullivan counties and part of what is now Delaware and Greene counties.
- Westchester County: now Westchester and Bronx counties.

On March 24, 1772:

- Tryon County was formed out of Albany County. It was renamed Montgomery County in 1784, with a later division to Herkimer County around Little Falls.
- Charlotte County was formed out of Albany County. It was renamed Washington County in 1784.

== Legal profession ==
The British governors were upper class aristocrats not trained in the law, and felt unduly constrained by the legalistic demands of the Americans. In the period from the 1680s to about 1715 numerous efforts were made to strengthen royal control and diminish legal constraints on the power of the governors. Colonial lawyers fought back successfully. An important technique that developed especially in Boston, Philadelphia and New York in the 1720s and 1730s was to mobilize public opinion by using the new availability of weekly newspapers and print shops that produced inexpensive pamphlets. The lawyers used the publicity medium to disseminate ideas about American legal rights as Englishmen. By the 1750s and 1760s, however, there was a counterattack ridiculing and demeaning the lawyers as pettifoggers. Their image and influence declined.

The lawyers of colonial New York organized a bar association, but it fell apart in 1768 during the bitter political dispute between the factions based in the Delancey and Livingston families. For the next century, various attempts were made, and failed, in New York state to build an effective organization of lawyers. The American Revolution saw the departure of many leading lawyers who were Loyalists; their clientele was often tied to royal authority or British merchants and financiers. They were not allowed to practice law unless they took a loyalty oath to the new United States of America. Many went to Britain or Canada after losing the war. Finally a Bar Association emerged in 1869 that proved successful and continues to operate.

=== Judiciary ===
Initially the Province of New York started with the system of courts it had had in its earlier period of English rule: the Court of Assizes, the Court of Sessions, and a series of town courts such as the Mayor's Court of the City of New York.

In 1683 the Court of Assizes was abolished, with its jurisdiction being transferred to a new Court of Oyer and Terminer and Court of Chancery.

The Supreme Court of Judicature of the Province of New York was established by the New York Assembly on 6 May 1691, replacing the Court of Oyer and Terminer. Jurisdiction was based on the English Courts of King's Bench, Common Pleas and Exchequer but excluded cases of equity which continued to be dealt with by the Court of Chancery. The Supreme Court continued in being under the Constitution of 1777, becoming the New York Supreme Court under the 1846 Constitution.

Chief Justices of the Supreme Court

Incumbent	Took office	Left office	Notes
Joseph Dudley	6 May 1691	1692	Removed from office by Governor
William "Tangier" Smith	11 November 1692	21 January 1701	
Abraham de Peyster	21 January 1701	5 August 1701	
William Atwood	5 August 1701	November 1702	Removed from office by Governor
William "Tangier" Smith	9 June 1702	5 April 1703	
John Bridges	5 April 1703	1704	Died 6 July 1704
Roger Mompesson	15 July 1704	1715	Died March 1715. Also Chief Justice of New Jersey (1704–1710) and Pennsylvania (1706)
Lewis Morris I	15 March 1715	1733	Removed from office by Governor
James De Lancey	1733	1760	Died 30 July 1760
Benjamin Pratt	October 1761	?1763	Died 5 January 1763
Daniel Hormansden	March 1763	1776	Died 28 September 1778

== Demographics ==
Historical population
Year	Pop.	±%
1664	10,000	—
1670	5,754	−42.5%
1680	9,830	+70.8%
1688	20,000	+103.5%
1690	13,909	−30.5%
1698	18,067	+29.9%
1700	19,107	+5.8%
1710	21,625	+13.2%
1715	31,000	+43.4%
1720	36,919	+19.1%
1723	40,564	+9.9%
1730	48,594	+19.8%
1731	50,289	+3.5%
1740	63,665	+26.6%
1749	73,448	+15.4%
1750	76,696	+4.4%
1756	96,775	+26.2%
1760	117,138	+21.0%
1770	162,920	+39.1%
1771	168,017	+3.1%
1780	210,541	+25.3%
Source: 1664–1760; 1771 1770–1780

Upstate New York (as well as parts of present Ontario, Quebec, Pennsylvania and Ohio) were occupied by the Five Nations (after 1720 becoming Six Nations, when joined by Tuscarora) of the Iroquois Confederacy for at least a half millennium before the Europeans came.

- In 1664, one-quarter of the population of New York was African American.
- In 1690, the population of the province was 20,000, of which 6,000 were in New York.
- In 1698, the population of the province was 18,607. 14% of the population of New York was black.
- The slave population grew after Queen Anne's war. The percentage of blacks in New York in 1731 and 1746 was 18% and 21% respectively.
- In 1756, the population of the province was about 100,000 of which about 14,000 were blacks. Most of the blacks in New York at this time were slaves.

== Economy ==
The fur trade established under Dutch rule continued to grow. As the merchant port of New York became more important, the economy expanded and diversified and the agricultural areas of Long Island and the regions further up the Hudson River developed. Fishermen also made a decent living because New York was next to the ocean, making it a port/fishing state. Inland, farming crops made farmers a lot of money in the colony. Tradesmen made a fortune selling their wares.

== Sources ==
- Lee, James Melvin (1923). History of American journalism. Boston, New York, Houghton Mifflin Company.
