= Dukes County, Province of New York =

Former county in Province of New York, United States

Dukes County
- County of Province of New York
- 1683–1691
- Area
  - Coordinates: 41.341°N 70.820°W
- History
  - Established: 1 November 1683
  - Disestablished: 1691
- Contained within
  - Crown colony: Province of New York
Succeeded by
Dukes County; Nantucket
- Today part of: United States

Dukes County was a county of the Province of New York from 1683 to 1691. It was established on November 1, 1683, at the same time as Kings County, Queens County, and Dutchess County. It consisted of the Elizabeth Islands, Martha's Vineyard, and Nantucket Island, all east of Long Island. In 1691, the county was transferred to the newly formed Province of Massachusetts Bay, where it was divided into Dukes County and Nantucket in Massachusetts.

== Notes ==
- The Magazine of History with Notes and Queries, Contributor and Publisher William Abbatt, v.22 1916 Jan-Jun, page 76
- Simon Athearn's 1694 rough Island map, now in the Massachusetts State Archives, was published in Arthur Railton's The History of Martha's Vineyard.
