= Jan Cicero Gallery =

- Established: 1974
- Dissolved: 2003
- Location: Chicago, Illinois; Telluride, Colorado; Evanston, Illinois
- Type: Contemporary art gallery
- Founder: Jan Cicero

Jan Cicero Gallery was a contemporary art gallery founded and directed by Jan Cicero (née Pickett), which operated from 1974 to 2003, with locations in Evanston and Chicago, Illinois and Telluride, Colorado. The gallery was noted for its early, exclusive focus on Chicago abstract artists at a time when they were largely neglected, its role in introducing Native American artists to mainstream art venues beyond the Southwest, and its showcasing of late-career and young women artists. The gallery focused on painting, and to a lesser degree, works on paper, often running counter to the city's prevailing art currents (e.g., Imagist figuration in the 1970s and Conceptual art in the 1980s and 1990s). It was also notable as a pioneer of two burgeoning Chicago gallery districts, the West Hubbard Street alternative corridor of the 1970s, and the River North district in the 1980s.

Jan Cicero Gallery represented notable artists including: abstractionists Carol Diehl, Laurie Fendrich, Virginio Ferrari, Budd Hopkins, Vera Klement, Susan Michod, and Corey Postiglione; Native Americans Edgar Heap of Birds, Truman Lowe, Jaune Quick-to-See Smith, and Emmi Whitehorse; early Chicago Imagists George Cohen Theodore Halkin and Evelyn Statsinger; representational painters Arthur Lerner and James Cook; and artist/critics Keith Morrison and Peter Plagens. The gallery was frequently featured in national and regional art coverage in Artforum, Art in America ARTnews, Arts Magazine New Art Examiner, and Chicago's major newspapers, as well as in articles about the art market in Art+Auction, Crain's Chicago Business and the Chicago Tribune.

== History ==
Jan Cicero has often described her career as a gallerist as "an accidental" one. She began more than a decade into adulthood, after marrying future lawyer and author Frank Cicero Jr. in 1959, teaching Physical Education and Dance for six years, and having two children, Erica and Caroline (in 1965 and 1970), all of which sidelined an interest in art piqued when a high school teacher introduced her to Jackson Pollock and Abstract Expressionism. Cicero's passion resurfaced during graduate studies at Northwestern University (MA, Education, 1969), when she took studio art courses with artist and professor George Cohen, and solidified during an art survey course led by Chicago artist Corey Postiglione at the Evanston Art Center in 1973.

=== Beginnings in Evanston ===
Through Postiglione's course, Cicero became aware of the large number of local abstract artists working in relative obscurity in the shadow of Imagism, which dominated the city's art scene at the time. Some of these artists had banded together in solidarity (e.g., "The Five," which included Ted Argeropolos, Larry Booth, Martin Hurtig, Vera Klement, and Larry Salomon—all of whom showed with Cicero at some point). In 1974, Cicero decided to try to remedy the situation. She hung the work of a second abstract group—the self-dubbed "Artists Anonymous," which included Carol Diehl, Mary Jo Marks, Tony Giliberto, Frank Pannier and Postiglione—on the empty walls of her large, newly purchased Evanston home and held an opening. For the next few years she ran what Chicago Daily News critic Franz Schulze would later call "a lively gallery" out of her home.

=== Downtown Chicago gallery ===
In March 1977, Jan Cicero Gallery relocated to a rented space at 433 N. Clark Street, in a downtown Chicago red-light district being pioneered by a restaurateur, Gordon Sinclair. At the time, the city's art scene was beginning to expand beyond being what Franz Schulze deemed "a one-corner art town," with alternative galleries, such as N.A.M.E., Artemisia and A.R.C. having opened around the corner on Hubbard Street to avoid the high rents of the established Michigan Avenue/Ontario Street gallery district. N.A.M.E. co-founder and future New York magazine critic Jerry Saltz was one of the gallery's first employees. Cicero's gallery was the first commercial gallery to open in the district and one of the first in the city to exclusively show abstract art. In November 1978, the gallery moved to a larger space on the same block, at 437 N. Clark.

By 1983, the gallery looked to expand further, and joined the Richard Gray, Rhona Hoffman, Donald Young, and Zolla/Lieberman galleries in exploring a former warehouse district further north and west that came to be known as River North. It moved that year into larger quarters in a two-story building at 221 W. Erie Street that Cicero and her husband Frank purchased. The move came in advance of a 1980s surge in the art market that saw the number of galleries in Chicago double until a recession-driven slump in 1990 reversed the trend.

The gallery weathered that slump, as well as neighborhood tensions between the galleries and small businesses that helped revitalize the district and new investors seeking to rezone the area to open large nightclub and entertainment venues in the late 1980s. The gallery and other River North Association businesses took an active role in the dispute, which involved well-known Chicagoans Walter Payton, restaurateur Rich Melman, and Alderman Burton Natarus on the other side. Their efforts failed; in 1989, the 7,500-foot Walter Payton's American Bar replaced an antique business next door to the gallery. A few years later, a Hooters restaurant opened across the street. In 1999, Cicero decided the neighborhood had changed too much. She sold the building on Erie and moved to a new gallery district west of the Chicago Loop on Washington Street, where she operated until early 2003.

=== Telluride gallery ===
In 1987, Cicero and her husband built a home in the mountains outside of Telluride, Colorado. The new locale inspired Cicero to explore the area's regional and Native cultures, and eventually, to show some of the work she discovered. In 1989, she opened a second gallery, in Telluride—Jan Cicero Gallery at the Golden West, which operated for eight years. The space featured the work of Native American artists, Western and landscape painters, and contemporary abstract artists, as well as ceramics, weaving and regional craft work that contextualized some of the art work. The gallery served as a springboard for Native American and Western artists to attain greater recognition in mainstream art venues beyond the West and for educating the art world about such work.

== Work and artists exhibited ==
Throughout its operation, Jan Cicero Gallery was known for showing work that was underrepresented or under-appreciated. Cicero has stated that she only showed work that she felt was "real and sincere." According to critic Carole Stodder, this often meant work with a concern for surface and formal properties over content or imagery, in which the artist's distinctive mark or process was visible. In a Chicago Reader feature, Cicero said, "I wasn't interested in conceptual art, photography, or video. I wasn't trying to have the next big thing. I was showing art that might not have been seen anywhere else."

=== Abstract work ===
In its early years, the gallery exclusively showed abstract work that Cicero felt was shortchanged by local critics or museums in favor of the figurative, surrealist-Pop work of the Chicago Imagists. These early shows—often the artists' first solo shows—included work by minimalist and geometric painters Martin Hurtig, Tony Giliberto, Mary Jo Marks, and Corey Postiglione, Pattern and Decoration artist Susan Michod, and sculptors Virginio Ferrari and Peter Ambrose, as well as more gestural or lyrical work from Carol Diehl, Vera Klement, Richard Loving and Frank Pannier. Frustrated by the lack of recognition of these artists, Cicero confronted critic Franz Schulze after a lecture on the Imagists at the exclusive Fortnightly Club, noting during the Q&A, "There are interesting Chicago abstract artists, and you should get to know them."

Her early efforts received mixed results; New Art Examiner critics Jane Allen and Derek Guthrie panned an early group show that she curated for the aesthetics of its public setting in a Northwestern University building lobby and for its inclusiveness, despite also noting the presence of "some of Chicago's finer abstract artists." Nonetheless, the gallery's abstract artists were soon receiving consistent recognition from the magazine, as well as from newspaper critics like Schulze and the Art Institute of Chicago. That experience encouraged Cicero to open a full-fledged gallery. A decade later, New Art Examiner writers Alice Thorson and Michel Segard both would highlight the gallery as "strong supporter of Chicago abstraction" over many years, particularly geometric work that in Chicago traced its lineage to the Bauhaus-rooted Institute of Design. The gallery would continue to feature a wide range of abstract work from artists at various stages in their careers, including early or first solo exhibitions of Leslie Baum, Laurie Fendrich, Barbara Grad, Bonnie Hartenstein, Sam Prekop, and Dannielle Tegeder, as well as shows of Frances Barth, Barbara Blades, geometric painter James Juszczyk Karen Kunc, Richard Loving, Peter Plagens, constructivist Martin Prekop, Julie Richman, Jane Sangerman, color-field painter Richard Smith, Annette Turow, and Emmi Whitehorse.

=== Representational work ===
In the mid-1980s, as the art world became more pluralistic, the gallery expanded its focus to include representational work from a wider geographic area—sometimes to the chagrin of its abstract stable. Some of the new artists included Midwest art professors such as Peter Marcus and regional landscape painters like Robert Lee Skaggs, Diane Canfield Bywaters and Stephen Pentak, and cityscape painters William Kohn and Ernest Viveiros. Others, like landscape painters James Cook, Peter Holbrook, Merrill Mahaffey, DeAnn Melton, Diane Lucille Meyer (then known as Diane Meyer Melton), and Theodore Waddell, came from the West. Chicagoan and former "Monster Roster" painter Arthur Lerner and Debra Yoo would show both landscapes and still lifes, while Keith Morrison and Bernard Williams created work incorporating African–American iconography.

Exhibits that the gallery put up in a representational vein included the landscape surveys "Out West" (1989) and "Urban Sites" (1991), and the still life show, "Immovable Object" (1998). In 1989, inspired by the Telluride scenery, Cicero invited five Midwest landscape painters to paint from her home there, and later exhibited some of the work in both galleries.

=== Contemporary Native American work ===
During her time in Telluride, Cicero immersed herself in regional Native American, Hispanic and Western culture. She met artist Jaune Quick-to-See Smith, who introduced her to the work of other Native American artists. That exploration led to numerous shows—at the Telluride gallery and later in Chicago—and two major traveling exhibits: "Without Boundaries: Contemporary Native American Art" (1991) and "Native Streams" (1996), which featured nineteen artists. The latter show, organized by Cicero and Indiana State University professor and artist Craig McDaniel, and assisted by gallery co-director Kathie Shaw and Craig Zollars, traveled from Chicago to five regional art museums across the country. Well-known Native American artists that the gallery showed include Norman Akers, Rick Bartow, Sara Bates, Joe Feddersen, Ted Garner, Edgar Heap of Birds, Truman Lowe, Mario Martinez, Lillian Pitt, Duane Slick, Bently Spang, Jaune Quick-to-See Smith, Kay WalkingStick and Emmi Whitehorse.

A key aim of the gallery and artists was to present the complex blend of formal training, tribal affiliation and life experience that shaped Native artists' work and to demonstrate the wide range of artistic strategies they employed, resisting trite notions of tradition and authenticity. Reception to the new work wasn't completely positive; some artists felt that it disturbed the purity of the gallery's aesthetic, while others, according to Cicero, were puzzled that the work seemed more like "real art" than "Indian art." Cicero described the work as "contemporary art by artists who happen to be [Native American] … Some of the work is very political and some of it is very abstract. They're professors at universities, they teach and they just do their work. They're not trying to fit into anybody's stereotype." Critical response was positive; the New Art Examiner's Michael Freeman called "Native Streams" "one of the most successful group shows" he'd seen in a long time, unified by grace and subtlety, and lacking in stereotypes. Chicago critics Barbara Buchholz and Fred Camper noted the show's wide range of imagery and artistic expression, from recognizably Native American to the most contemporary.

=== "Rediscovered" artists ===
The gallery frequently sought out late-career artists—particularly women—who may have been unduly neglected over time, due to changes in style, closed galleries, or personal issues like the demands of raising families. Cicero sometimes called them "rediscovered artists." In 1985, the gallery presented new work from veteran Chicago surrealist Evelyn Statsinger, who first came to prominence as a member of the 1950s School of the Art Institute-based "Monster Roster," which also included Leon Golub and June Leaf. Statsinger had slipped out of limelight by the 1980s, but reemerged with painstakingly rendered paintings of dense organic patterns in six, well-covered solo shows at the gallery. The gallery also presented a late-career show for painter Constance Teander Cohen (her first major exhibition, in 1983), and a retrospective of her work a decade later, alongside paintings by her husband, George Cohen. Other late-career artists included semi-abstract painter Eleanor Himmelfarb (1985), influential photographer Barbara Crane (1996), and Theodore Halkin, another former Monster Roster/Imagist. Beginning in 1982, the gallery mounted four solo exhibitions of Halkin, who had reemerged after a period of inactivity with a new impressionistic style quite different from his earlier mythic, expressionistic work.

== Closing ==
On January 31, 2003, Cicero closed the gallery in order to focus on her family. She continued to represent artists privately and to work as a curator and art consultant.
