= Charles Cowles (art dealer) =

American art dealer and collector

Charles Cowles (born 1941) is an American art dealer and a collector of contemporary art. Cowles was also a curator of Fine Art at the Seattle Art Museum from 1975 until 1979.

He opened his contemporary art gallery at 420 West Broadway in SoHo in lower Manhattan in 1979, mounting the first public exhibition there in April 1980. The Charles Cowles Gallery was finally located on 537 West 24th Street, between 10th and 11th Avenues in Chelsea in New York City.

In June 2009, after thirty years as an art dealer, Cowles closed his contemporary art gallery and retired.

Cowles was the publisher of Artforum magazine from the mid-1960s until the early-1980s. He graduated from Stanford University in the early-1960s and originally operated the magazine in 1965 from Los Angeles, California. By 1967, he moved Artforum to Manhattan. His family was also connected to publishing via the Cowles Media Company.

== Selected artists ==
During its years of operation from April 1980 through July 2009 the Charles Cowles Gallery exhibited many artists including: Oliver Arms, Charles Arnoldi, Dennis Ashbaugh, David Bates, Howard Ben Tré, Mark Boyle, Marsha Burns, Sandro Chia, Dale Chihuly, Gene Davis, Ronald Davis, Jim DeFrance, William Eggleston, Vernon Fisher, Caio Fonseca, Richard Hamilton, Duncan Hannah, Tom Holland, Patrick Ireland, Harry Kramer, Ronnie Landfield, Frank Lobdell, Michael Lucero, Alden Mason, Robert Motherwell, Manuel Neri, Nathan Oliveira, Beverly Pepper, Joanna Pousette-Dart, Jean-Marc Prouveur, Mimmo Rotella, Martin Saar, Italo Scanga, James Surls, Frank Stella, Toshiko Takaezu, Peter Voulkos, Darren Waterston, William T. Wiley, and Xiaoze Xie.

== See also ==
- List of museums and cultural institutions in New York City
- Girl in Mirror § 2012 lawsuit
