= Frank Cicero Jr. =

American lawyer and author (1935–2024)

- Born: November 30, 1935; Chicago, Illinois, U.S.
- Died: February 25, 2024 (aged 88); Evanston, Illinois, U.S.
- Education: University of Chicago Law School, Princeton University, Wheaton College, Amherst College
- Occupations: Lawyer, author
- Employer: Kirkland & Ellis
- Spouse: Jan Cicero (m. 1959–2024) (his death)

Frank Cicero Jr. (November 30, 1935 – February 25, 2024) was an American trial and appellate lawyer and published historian. In his five-decade career as a litigator and partner at the international law firm Kirkland & Ellis, he handled major U.S. civil and criminal trials and highly publicized international proceedings, such as those arising out of the Amoco Cadiz and Exxon Valdez oil spills. His legal work was recognized by the Chambers & Partners and The Best Lawyers In America lawyer-rating directories, The New York Times and Chicago Tribune, and several books. In 1969–70, he served as a delegate to the Sixth Illinois Constitutional Convention, which drafted the state's most recent constitution. Cicero wrote two history books, Relative Strangers: Italian Protestants in the Catholic World (2011) and Creating the Land of Lincoln: The History and Constitutions of Illinois 1778-1870 (2018). The latter work won the Illinois State Historical Society's Russell P. Strange Book of the Year Award in 2019, in recognition of its contribution to the study of Illinois history.

== Early life and education ==
Frank Cicero, Jr. was born in Chicago in 1935 to Italian-American parents, Frank, Sr. and Mary (née Balma) Cicero. His two sets of grandparents emigrated from Italy, independently settling in a near-northwest side Italian neighborhood in Chicago less than two blocks from one another in 1904. Giacomo and Margherita Balma were Waldensians (an Italian Protestant movement) from the Italian northwest region of Piedmont; Giuseppe Cicero was a Catholic from Montemaggiore, Sicily who emigrated to Buffalo in 1893, where he met and married Antonina Panepinto, also a Catholic, from Valledolmo, Sicily. The two families remained unknown to one another for nearly thirty years, until Cicero's parents, Frank, Sr. and Mary, met while working at the nearby LaMantia Brothers produce house. They courted and privately wed in early 1935 over the opposition of their families, due to religious and cultural (northern/southern Italy) differences. Cicero, Jr. and his siblings, James and Nancy, were raised in his mother's Protestant faith; his family's unique history served as the springboard and subject of his first book.

After his family moved to suburban Western Springs, Frank, Jr. became the first in his family to go to high school or college, attending Lyons Township High School in La Grange and Amherst College in Massachusetts (1953–4), before transferring to Wheaton College in Illinois, where he earned a Bachelor's Degree in Political Science (1957). After marrying Jan (née Pickett) Cicero in 1959, Cicero enrolled at Princeton University's Woodrow Wilson School of Public and International Affairs, where he earned a Master in Public Affairs degree in 1962. That fall, they returned to Chicago and Cicero attended the University of Chicago Law School (J.D., 1965), where he was chosen for the Board of Editors of the Law Review and selected for the Order of the Coif. In 1965, he was hired by the Chicago-founded international law firm, Kirkland & Ellis (then named Kirkland, Ellis, Hodson, Chaffetz, & Masters).

== Legal career ==
Cicero was a member of Kirkland & Ellis for more than five decades as a litigator, partner (since 1970), and senior partner. He handled major civil and criminal trials in U.S. federal and state courts as well as international arbitrations and litigations. He represented Skidmore Owings & Merrill before the Iranian-American Claims Tribunal in The Hague (1981–2) and corporations such as Abbott Laboratories, Ameritech, Amoco, BP, General Motors, Nissan and Price Waterhouse, in cases that range from antitrust and trade regulation to environmental issues to trademark claims.

Cicero's work was recognized in several editions of the lawyer-rating directories The Best Lawyers In America, and Chambers & Partners America's Leading Business Lawyers, as well as in the books, Superwreck (1987), which details the Amoco Cadiz oil spill, and The Man Who Beat Clout City (1977), about a landmark police discrimination suit. Chambers & Partners identified Cicero as "the elder statesman" at K&E, highlighting his litigation and defense experience, strategic advice, and oversight of major cases. The Chicago Tribune described him as "one of the top corporate trial lawyers in Chicago;" in an interview, Senior U.S. District Judge Prentice H. Marshall named him among "the great lawyers" that appeared before him. After Richard M. Daley's election as mayor in 1989, Cicero was widely mentioned as a candidate to succeed him as interim Cook County State's Attorney. In 2009, Cicero was among the nation's lawyers honored by Best Lawyers at its 25th anniversary event.

=== Notable cases ===
In 1975, Cicero became the chief litigator representing the Chicago Afro-American Patrolmen's League (AAPL) and Renault Robinson in a civil suit (United States v. City of Chicago, 395 F. Supp. 329) against the Chicago Police Department regarding racial discrimination in hiring, promotion, assignment and discipline. Author and Chicago Defender editor Robert McClory described Cicero in the courtroom as quick on his feet and "extraordinarily authoritative yet non-threatening," a "perfect foil" to the city's often overbearing defense attorney. In Judge Prentice Marshall's 1976 ruling—which impacted police integration cases across the country—Cicero won damages and injunctions regulating future hiring, promotion and conduct.

From 1978 to 1992, Cicero represented Amoco in U.S. and European proceedings brought by various French parties over damages resulting from the oil spill of the supertanker Amoco Cadiz off the coast of Brittany in 1978. Authors Yvon Rochard and Alphonse Arzel, a senator and leader in the proceedings for the French, described Cicero as thorough, highly informed, forceful and "ruthless." According to author Rudolph Chelminski, Cicero devised a two-pronged strategy, contending that the wreck resulted from negligent design and engineering by the shipbuilder, Astilleros Espanoles, and that the spill's effects were worsened by the incompetence of French authorities in preparedness and response. In the initial 1984 court decision, Amoco was found liable, however Cicero succeeded in having Astilleros also found responsible, and in limiting damages based on incompetent clean-up efforts. After several appeals, Amoco agreed to pay $200 million in 1992, a figure much lower than the French claim, which amounted to $1.6 billion.

Cicero also represented BP in proceedings resulting from the 1989 Exxon Valdez oil spill. BP was sued for damages as the principal owner of Alyeska, which participated in response efforts and operated the crude oil pipeline from North Slope of Alaska to the station where the tanker was loaded.

=== Legal writing and lecturing ===
Cicero wrote journal articles and book chapters on a variety of legal matters, and lectured before state and federal bar associations, the University of Chicago Law School, the National Institute of Trial Advocacy, Harvard Law School Trial Practice Institute, and others. His article, "Personal Jurisdiction and Service," serves as a chapter in the book Business and Commercial Litigation in Federal Courts (1998), and his articles on final argument and verdict strategy are published in The Litigation Manual: Trial (1999).

== History books ==
Cicero's first book, Relative Strangers (2011), explored his family's Italian and religious roots through the immigrant journeys of his Waldensian Protestant and Catholic grandparents from Italy to Chicago, where their paths crossed with the meeting of his parents. It also traced the history of the Waldensians, who were a proto-Protestant reform sect founded in 12th-century Lyon, France and now centered in Piedmont, Italy; they were declared heretics in 1215 by the Catholic Church and persecuted in the centuries that followed by the Medieval Inquisition and in massacres such as the Piedmontese Easter of 1655. Theologian Richard Peace called the book "a rich read" that points to ways to overcome religious division. Author Scott Turow described it as "part personal memoir, part history of religion and always compelling reading. It illustrates yet again the diversity of the human family and the unpredictable paths taken by the quest for faith."

Cicero's second book, Creating the Land of Lincoln (2018), detailed neglected aspects of Illinois's political history by studying its 19th-century constitutional conventions and constitutions, which recast the state from one destined as an extension of the American South into a northern stronghold. Professor and reviewer Todd E. Pettys described it as "carefully researched and engagingly written" and relevant to "those interested in nineteenth-century politics of race in the Midwest, the forces that placed Douglas and Lincoln on the nation's political stage." Cicero isolated key debates and actions and their effects, such as a boundary change written into the initial 1818 constitution that extended Illinois north to include the future Chicago and waterways access, or a controversial provision allowing so-called "voluntary" indenture contracts, which in essence maintained a form of slavery in the state. Together, these events attracted and emboldened North-oriented European and New England commercial settlers who later enabled the rise of Lincoln's Republican Party and passage of the state's progressive 1870 constitution, which remained in effect for 100 years.

== Public service ==
Cicero served as an elected delegate to the Sixth Illinois Constitutional Convention, which drafted the state's current, 1970 constitution. The document included key bans on discrimination by race, color, creed, national ancestry and sex, protective measures for women and the disabled, and provisions for home rule. He also served as a delegate to the 1972 Democratic National Convention. In 1990, he established the Frank Cicero, Jr. Faculty Fund at the University of Chicago Law School, which supports faculty research. Cicero was a trustee of the Crow Canyon Archaeological Center and Newberry Library in Chicago, and previously served as a trustee for the Nature Conservancy of Colorado and the American Waldensian Society.

== Personal life ==
Cicero was married to Jan Cicero since 1959. They have two daughters, Erica Cicero and Caroline Cicero, born in 1965 and 1970. In 1974, Jan opened Jan Cicero Gallery, initially operating out of their newly purchased Evanston home. She relocated the gallery to Chicago's downtown area in 1977, eventually settling in the River North gallery district. In 1987, they built a home in the mountains outside of Telluride, Colorado and Jan opened a second gallery there. She ceased all gallery operations in 2003.

Cicero died at his Evanston, Illinois home on February 25, 2024, at age 88.
