= Jim DeFrance =

American artist (1940–2014)

Jim DeFrance (born, 1940 Alliance, Nebraska; died 2014 Los Angeles, California) was a West Coast artist known for his abstract, shaped panel paintings and meticulous constructions. He utilized a reductive process while incorporating architectural references, geometric foundations, and fine carpentry into his work. He was most known for his “Slot” paintings, where he developed a surface structure of trapezoids on top of a bold color field.

== Career ==
DeFrance was born in Alliance, Nebraska in 1940. His father was a cabinetmaker and this influence led him to study architecture before deciding to be a fine artist. In 1961 at the age of 21, DeFrance attended the Yale University Summer School of Music and Art in Norfolk, Connecticut before moving to Colorado, where he earned his Bachelor of Fine Art at the University of Colorado Boulder. He kept moving west and finished his Master of Arts at the University of California, Los Angeles in 1965 where he met classmates Vija Celmins and Allan McCollum. He was also closely aligned with artists Roland Reiss, Peter Plagens, Ron Linden, and Gary Lloyd. In the 1970s and 1980s, DeFrance taught in the art departments at University of California, Irvine and University of Southern California.

DeFrance started exhibiting his work in 1965. His work has been exhibited at the following institutions and more Los Angeles County Museum of Art (LACMA), Los Angeles Institute for Contemporary Art (LAICA), Newport Harbor Art Museum (now the Orange County Museum of Art), Museum of Contemporary Art Chicago, La Jolla Art Museum (now the Museum of Contemporary Art San Diego), and Aldrich Museum of Contemporary Art. He was also affiliated with the following galleries in Los Angeles and New York: Nicholas Wilder Gallery, Jan Baum Gallery, Rolf Nelson Gallery, Sonnabend Gallery, Charles Cowles Gallery, and Leo Castelli Gallery. A major retrospective of DeFrance's work was curated by Tom Dowling and Trevor Norris for the Frank M. Doyle Arts Pavilion, Orange Coast College, Costa Mesa, CA. “Jim DeFrance: A Retrospective” was on view February 8-April 7, 2019. The monograph “Jim DeFrance: Light, Space, Materials,” accompanying the exhibition features essays by the curators and art critic Peter Plagens.

== Collections ==
DeFrance has work in the following public collections: Cedars-Sinai Hospital, Los Angeles, CA; Laguna Art Museum, Laguna Beach, CA; La Jolla Museum of Fine Arts, La Jolla, CA; Newport Harbor Art Museum, Newport Beach, CA; Bank of America, Tokyo, Japan; and Frederick R. Weisman Collection, Santa Monica, CA.
