= Arzl =

Arzl may refer to:

- Arzl, Innsbruck, a borough of Innsbruck, Austria
- Arzl im Pitztal, a municipality in Austria

== See also ==
- Arzel
