= Peter Plagens =

American journalist

- Born: 1941 (age 84–85); Dayton, Ohio, U.S.
- Education: Syracuse University; University of Southern California
- Known for: Painting, drawing, art criticism
- Style: Abstract
- Spouse: Laurie Fendrich
- Website: Peter Plagens

Peter Plagens (born 1941) is an American artist, art critic, and novelist based in New York City. He is most widely known for his longstanding contributions to Artforum and Newsweek (senior writer and art critic, 1989–2003), and for what critics have called a remarkably consistent, five-decade-long body of abstract formalist painting. Plagens has written three books on art, Bruce Nauman: The True Artist (2014), Moonlight Blues: An Artist's Art Criticism (1986) and Sunshine Muse: Modern Art on the West Coast, 1945-70 (1974), and two novels, The Art Critic (2008) and Time for Robo (1999). He has been awarded major fellowships for both his painting (John Simon Guggenheim Foundation, National Endowment for the Arts) and his writing (Andy Warhol Foundation, National Endowment for the Arts). Plagens's work has been featured in surveys at the Museum of Modern Art, Los Angeles County Museum of Art (LACMA), Whitney Museum, and PS1, and in solo exhibitions at the Hirshhorn Museum and Las Vegas Art Museum. In 2004, the USC Fisher Gallery organized and held a 30-year traveling retrospective of his work. Critics have contrasted the purely visual dialogue his art creates—often generating more questions than answers—with the directness of his writing; they also contend that the visibility of his bylines as a critic has sometimes overshadowed his artmaking—unduly. Los Angeles Times critic David Pagel described Plagens's painting as a "fusion of high-flying refinement and everyday awkwardness" with an intellectual savvy, disdain for snobbery and ungainliness he likened to Willem de Kooning's work. Reviewing Plagens's 2018 exhibition, New York Times critic Roberta Smith called the show an "eye-teasing sandwich of contrasting formalist strategies," the hard-won result of a decade of focused experimentation.

Peter Plagens, Cleveland Defaults on Its Debts, acrylic on canvas, 66" x 90", 1979

== Life and career ==
Plagens was born in Dayton, Ohio in 1941 and grew up in Los Angeles. He attended the University of Southern California, where he majored in painting (BFA, 1962) and drew cartoons for the Daily Trojan. He left USC an abstract painter, influenced by Hans Hofmann, Willem de Kooning, Richard Diebenkorn and Elmer Bischoff, which set him at odds with the somewhat conservative painting faculty at Syracuse University (MFA, 1964) where he did his graduate studies. He moved back to California in 1965 and took an Assistant Curator position at the Long Beach Museum of Art; soon after, he approached Artforum editor Phil Leider for work as a reviewer—at five dollars per review—in order to keep up with the Los Angeles art scene. In 1966, Plagens accepted a teaching position at the University of Texas, remaining until 1969, when he accepted a position at California State University, Northridge. He taught there until 1978, and at the University of California, Berkeley (1972), the University of Southern California (1978–80), and the University of North Carolina (1980–4), where he also chaired the art department.

During his time at Cal State, Plagens shared a 3,000-square-foot studio with painter Walter Gabrielson on the same block in Pasadena as artist Bruce Nauman's; in 1975, he appeared in Nauman's short film Pursuit. Plagens began exhibiting professionally in 1967, and was featured in the 1971 LACMA show, "24 Young Los Angeles Artists" and the 1972 Whitney Biennial. He has shown at Nancy Hoffman Gallery in New York since 1975, and showed regularly at the Jan Baum Gallery in Los Angeles (1977–1992) and Jan Cicero Gallery in Chicago (1986–98). His 2004 retrospective at USC traveled to Columbia College Chicago and the Butler Institute of American Art in Akron. Plagens married the painter, Laurie Fendrich, in 1981. They moved to New York City in 1985 where they continue to reside, while also maintaining a studio outside the city.

Peter Plagens, Wheels of Wonder, acrylic on canvas, 66" x 96", 1985

== Artwork and reception ==
Critic Dave Hickey, among others, has characterized Plagens as "an irrevocably abstract formalist painter," who, regardless of fashion, has rooted his work in modernist and Abstract Expressionism syntax, formal rigor, and a willful embrace of dissonance and contradictions—such as hard-edged geometry and messy, gestural abstraction, "happy accident and copious correction," and beauty and intentional clunkiness. David Pagel wrote that Plagens's 2004 retrospective traced "a remarkably consistent arc" of stubbornly held abstract work of "sophisticated inelegance." Plagens works improvisationally, sometimes pushing his paintings to the edge of failure, by his own admission and according to critics. He maintains there is no symbolism in his work; he often appends enigmatic titles to his work upon completion, however, that indicate his ruminations while in the studio. Throughout his career, he has produced works on paper that generally correspond in style to his paintings, incorporating collaged photographs, fragments of commercial packaging, and colored and textured paper.

Peter Plagens, Benton Way and Sunset, LA, 6/28/55, 1:40pm, mixed media on canvas, 20" x 26", 1989

=== Art, 1970–1999 ===
Plagens's early work featured single, emphatic shapes—circles with wedges removed, diamonds, trapezoids, and thin letter "C"-like rings—which he placed on vivid red-orange or creamy white color fields that sometimes disintegrated at the canvas edges into irregular, soft bands of subtle color. Increasingly minimal works, such as Cleveland Defaults on Its Debts (1979) or Cubist Landscape (1980), have been recognized for carefully calibrated compositions that challenged conventional rules about balance and probed the line between elegance and awkwardness, and friction and harmony. In pivotal paintings of the mid-1980s, such as Wheels of Wonder (1985) and Wedge of Life (1987), Plagens incorporated angular, eccentric polygons, greater surface variation and a new sense of movement that reviewers such as Grace Glueck deemed "witty balancing acts." During this time, he also created the drawing series "My Father Worked in Advertising" (1986), which featured dappled, abstract expressionist-like areas around the edges over which he painted and collaged fields of color and hard-edged and irregular shapes.

Critics noted a building complexity and immediacy in Plagens's output from 1989 to 2000, the result of a more expansive mix of materials, markmaking and palettes. In paintings such as Benton Way and Sunset, LA, 6/28/55, 1:40 pm (1989) and Learning of the Tragic News (1996), he introduced expressive drips and gestural, free-form marks and shapes, that Michael Kimmelman wrote had "a looping calligraphic eloquence" recalling Arshile Gorky and Richard Diebenkorn. Of particular note were the small, brightly colored, discordant geometric forms that Plagens set against primarily off-white and slate-gray backdrops, which critics suggested "snapped" his rhythmic compositions into place.

=== Art, 2000– ===
Peter Plagens, The Ides of October, mixed media on canvas, 72" x 66", 2017

Between 2000 and 2003, Plagens sought to create a greater degree of tension In a series of untitled works on paper by subdividing them into two fields: one containing fluid, expressive shapes and linear forms on gray or khaki-colored grounds, atop another, featuring configurations of jarring, hard-edged rectangles set on black or off-white fields. In later paintings, he dispensed with the subdivision, creating more centralized compositions that featured flat, irregular, near-fluorescent color shapes directly painted on neutral grounds of contrasting gestural shapes and marks.

Peter Plagens, The Sinister Man 2, mixed media on Arches paper, 30" x 22", 2018

In the 2010s, Plagens garnered some of the best reviews of his career for shows that critics described, variously, as "jaunty, accomplished disquisitions" or heated, "intimate discourses" exploring the co-existence of incompatible styles, formal concepts and paint application in single works. These paintings (e.g., The Ides of October or A Literary Sensibility, both 2017) and works on paper employed three main visual elements: a gestural, improvisational field of squiggles, loops and loose grids partially blotted out by a large, irregularly edged expanse of opaque orange, pink, lavender-gray or aqua, upon which Plagens set hard-edged, irregular polygons built from six or seven shards of bright color that he dubbed "color badges." Critics suggested that these badges mediated an ongoing flux between coherent wholes and fluid parts, order and disorder, freedom and restraint, establishing an uneasy, but engaging, "strange harmony."

Plagens's recent works on paper, such as The Sinister Man 2 (2018), have largely relied on centralized compositions, anchored by collaged photographs or found paper with text or graphic images that are contained by colored-paper or painted rectangular fields. Smaller in scale and less off-kilter in composition, these works have been seen as expressing a greater intimacy and poignancy than Plagens's paintings.

== Writing ==
Plagens has been a prominent art critic for more than five decades, producing numerous reviews, essays and articles about artists and the art world. He also authored the monograph, Bruce Nauman: The True Artist (2014), and two books of art criticism, Moonlight Blues: An Artist's Art Criticism (1986), and Sunshine Muse: Modern Art on the West Coast, 1945-70 (1974, re-issued 2000), Other critics characterize Plagens's writing as "stylish, clear-eyed," literate, direct and candid. In a 1974 New York Times review of Sunshine Muse, Hilton Kramer described Plagens as "the only amusing writer ever to appear in the pages of Artforum." Los Angeles Times critic Christopher Knight wrote that Plagens's Bruce Nauman monograph probed the question of what an artist is "with wit, insight and a prodigious amount of research, plus a good deal of personal experience"; other reviewers welcomed the book's first-person, near-confessional engagement with an artist frequently approached through academic jargon. Sunshine Muse, deemed "vivacious and valuable" in The New York Times, has often been quoted by critics exploring West Coast art and artists since its publication in 1974.

Plagens began writing for Artforum in 1966 and became a contributing editor in 1971 and an associate editor, West Coast in 1974. He was a senior writer and art critic for Newsweek from 1989 to 2003 and a contributing editor until 2010. Since 2011, he has written reviews and articles for The Wall Street Journal and blogged for the blogsite of the National Arts Journalism Program, ARTicles, since 2010. He has been published in The New York Times, The Los Angeles Times, Art in America, ARTnews, Art+Auction, The Nation, L.A. Weekly, and Bookforum, among many publications. Plagens has written catalogue essays for the artists Jim DeFrance, Tony DeLap, Don Gummer, Ron Linden, Nick Miller and Edward Ruscha, and for the exhibitions "Clay's Tectonic Shift: John Mason, Ken Price, and Peter Voulkos, 1956–1968" and "Pasadena to Santa Barbara" (both 2012).

Plagens has also written two novels: The Art Critic (2008) and Time for Robo (1999). Time for Robo incorporates themes of time travel, perception, the nature of reality, and the end of time, among others. Reviewers compared its themes and "Chinese box," stories-within-stories style to the novels of Thomas Pynchon, Kurt Vonnegut, Jim Dodge, and Robert Coover. The Art Critic (2008) is a roman à clef satirizing the contemporary New York art world from the perspectives of a well-known art critic, a contemporary sculptor and an art publishing assistant.

== Awards and collections ==
Plagens has received recognition from major art institutions for both his art and writing. He has received painting fellowships from the John Simon Guggenheim Foundation (1972), National Endowment for the Arts (1985, 1977), and the Brown Foundation at the Museum of Fine Arts, Houston (2009, 2017). His writing has been awarded fellowships from the Andy Warhol Foundation (Creative Capital Arts Writers Grant, 2008) and National Endowment for the Arts (art criticism, 1973), and he was one of four senior fellows in the National Arts Journalism Program at Columbia University in 1998. Plagens's art has been acquired by numerous public and corporate collections, including the Museum of Fine Arts, Houston, Hirshhorn Museum and Sculpture Garden, Denver Art Museum, Museum of Contemporary Art San Diego, Baltimore Museum of Art, Albright-Knox Gallery, Museum of New Mexico, and Ackland Art Museum, among others.
