= Carol Diehl =

American artist and writer

- Born: Philadelphia, Pennsylvania, U.S.
- Known for: Painting, Art criticism, Poetry
- Style: Abstraction

Carol Diehl is an American artist, art critic and poet, author of Banksy: Completed, The MIT Press, 2021, 2nd edition 2025 with translations in Italian and Spanish, as well as her award-winning blog Art Vent, she is best known for her paintings, which have often documented daily life in a manner described as diaristic, even compulsive, using dense, painterly, often indecipherable words, numbers and symbols in grid or geometric frameworks. Diehl has also been a prolific art critic, having contributed features and reviews to numerous periodicals, including Art in America, ARTnews, and Art + Auction, as well as to books and artist catalogues. In the 1990s, she became active in New York's performance poetry scene. Diehl lives in New York City and southwestern Massachusetts. She has two sons, Matt Diehl and Adam Diehl.

== Early career and life ==
Born in Philadelphia and raised in Chicago, Diehl attended MacMurray College in Illinois for two years, after which she married a graduate student at Yale University (since divorced) and moved to New Haven, Connecticut. She returned to Chicago in the early 1970s and began painting among a group of artists, including Barbara Blades, Liz Langer, Sandra Perlow and Fern Shaffer, studying at the Evanston Art Center with artist Corey Postiglione. Diehl was soon active in the art scene that flourished in Chicago, exhibiting her work at galleries such as Michael Wyman, Jan Cicero, and N.A.M.E. Gallery, and writing articles and reviews for the New Art Examiner, where she became Managing Editor. She had her first individual exhibition at Roy Boyd Gallery in 1980. During this time, her work was reviewed in the New Art Examiner, the Chicago Sun-Times, the Chicago Tribune, and the Chicago Daily News. In 1976, Diehl moved to New York to work as assistant to John Coplans, then editor of Artforum magazine.

== Painting ==
Diehl describes herself as a "painter who marries the literal with the abstract in a futile attempt to find balance between order and chaos." Art in America critic Cary Levine described her work as possessing "the intimacy of a personal journal at the same time that it is made impenetrable by her abstract style and refusal to provide the key to her encrypted symbolism." ARTnews critic Ingrid Periz wrote that the paintings' "disciplined surfaces make for lasting visual interest and … an almost meditative quality," in part due to Diehl's treatment of language as a formal device whose meaning cannot be decoded literally. In recent years, Diehl has moved from large-scale, complex, grids to more spare works of pencil and ink on paper that she describes as "merging precision with spontaneity."

In addition to the earlier exhibitions cited, Diehl's work has been shown in one-person exhibitions at the Berkshire Museum (2011), Richard Sena Gallery (2006), Gary Snyder Fine Art (2002), and Hirschl & Adler Modern (1996 and 1998). She has also shown her paintings in group exhibitions at, among others, the Queens Museum of Art, the Aldrich Contemporary Art Museum, and the Sidney Janis Gallery. Reviews of her work have appeared in ''''Art in America'''', ARTnews, The New York Times, New York, The Village Voice, and Review. Her work is widely held in corporate collections in New York and Chicago.

Diehl is the recipient of artists' fellowships from the New York Foundation for the Arts (1994) and the Pollock-Krasner Foundation (1995), as well as residency fellowships from the MacDowell Colony for the Arts (most recently, 2006), and the Millay Colony for the Arts (1992).

== Art criticism and blog ==
Diehl was a Contributing Editor to Art in America (2007-2016), where she wrote cover articles on Olafur Eliasson, Robert Irwin, Wolfgang Laib and Christian Marclay, as well as numerous other features and reviews. Her writing about contemporary art has also appeared in ARTnews, Art + Auction, Art & Antiques, New York, Civilization, and Metropolis. Diehl has written essays for numerous artists' catalogues and contributed essays to several books, including Olafur Eliasson Studio's Unspoken Spaces (2016), Along a Long Line by Michael Glier (2009), and A Place for the Arts: The MacDowell Colony, 1907-2007 (2007).

Known for her clear, insightful and candid writing style, Diehl has created a popular blog, Art Vent. In 2011, she received an Arts Writers Grant from the Creative Capital/Warhol Foundation for the blog.

== Teaching ==
Diehl taught painting and writing in the Graduate Fine Art Program of the School of Visual Arts in New York (1996–2006) and served on the Core Visual Arts faculty at Bennington College (1998-2002). She has been a visiting artist and lecturer at Yale University, Stanford University, Massachusetts College of Art and Design, the University of Iowa, Columbia College Chicago, the Vermont Studio Center, Vermont College of Fine Arts, the Fine Arts Work Center (MA), Rochester Institute of Technology, and the University for the Creative Arts in Canterbury, U.K.; Senior Critic in the University of Pennsylvania Visual Arts Program; and the Forkosh-Hirshman lecturer at Arizona State University in 2006.

== Poetry ==
In the early 1990s, Diehl was active in Downtown New York's performance poetry scene and has read her work at the Nuyorican Poets Café, The Kitchen, and the Poetry Project at St. Mark's Church, among others. She also appeared with Butch Morris's "Chorus of Poets" at The Public Theater, the Whitney Museum and the Bang on a Can Festival at Lincoln Center. Her poetry is included in the anthology Aloud: Voices from the Nuyorican Poets Cafe (Henry Holt and Company), winner of the 1994 American Book Award.

== Books ==
- Studio Olafur Eliasson, Unspoken Spaces, Chapter 1 (with Terrence Perk), Thames & Hudson, 2016.
- Carter Wiseman, Ed. A Place for the Arts: The MacDowell Colony, 1907-2007. Essays by Joan Acocella, Michael Chabon, Carol Diehl, Verlyn Klinkenborg, Paul Moravec, Ruth Reichl, Jean Valentine, Wendy Wasserstein, Jaqueline Woodson and Kevin Young.
- Mike Glier, Lisa Corrin and Carol Diehl, Mike Glier: Along a Long Line, Hudson Hills, 2009.
- Carol Diehl, with Valerie Ann Leeds, Anita Shreve, John Sacret Young. Andrew Stevovich: Essential Elements. Lenox: Hard Press Editions, 2007.

Diehl's book about the anonymous street artist, Banksy: Completed, will be published by The MIT Press in Fall, 2021.
