= The Serpent Chooses Adam and Eve =

1958 artwork by George Cohen

- Artist: George Cohen
- Year: 1958

The Serpent Chooses Adam and Eve is an oil/mirror collage laid on canvas created by George Cohen in 1958.

This key work caused "something of a sensation" at the 1958 Carnegie Invitational. Cohen combined deliberately clumsy, pictographic painting with collage, pasting in a round mirror and a hank of Eve's hair. Mirrors, he explains, "are the supreme illusion; they mock both the viewer and the painting."

It has been owned by the Alan Gallery, Carnegie Institute Department of Fine Arts, San Francisco Museum of Art, and Richard L. Feigen Gallery before its storage.
