= Dialogo (sculpture) =

1971 artwork by Virginio Ferrari in Chicago, Illinois, U.S.

- The sculpture in 2026
- Artist: Virginio Ferrari
- Location: Chicago, Illinois, U.S.; 41.7891°N 87.5982°W

Dialogo is an abstract 1971 sculpture by Virginio Ferrari, installed in front of Pick Hall at 5828 South University Avenue on the University of Chicago campus, Illinois, United States. The work is famous because of the shadow it casts that resembles a hammer and sickle.

Each year, a crowd of several dozen curious bystanders gathers to observe the formation of the shadow around noon. Ferrari himself has denied that he intended his sculpture to cast such a shadow.

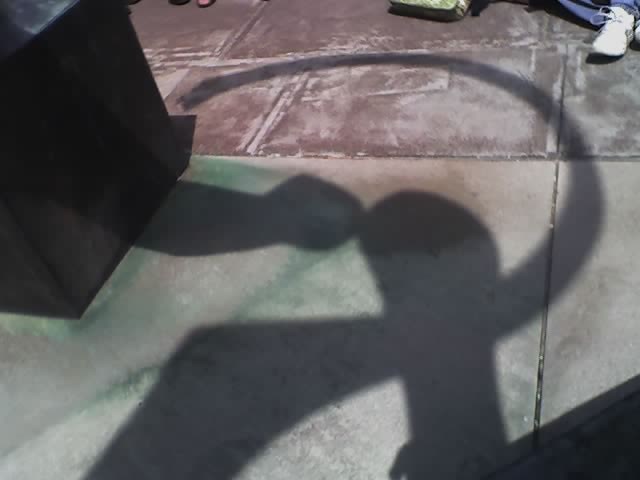
Dialogo. Image taken at 12:00 noon, May 1, 2007, showing the modified hammer and sickle image visible at that time.

Plaque, 2026

== See also ==
- 1971 in art
