= Frances Barth =

American artist (born 1946)

- Born: 1946 (age 79–80); The Bronx, New York
- Education: Hunter College
- Known for: Painting, video, animation, graphic novel
- Spouses: Ron Nakahara; Harvey Quaytman (divorced)
- Awards: Guggenheim Fellowship, Anonymous Was a Woman, Joan Mitchell, Pollock-Krasner, Adolph and Esther Gottlieb, American Academy of Arts and Letters,
- Website: Frances Barth

Frances Barth, Untitled Ramble, acrylic on panels (triptych), 24" x 96", 2018.

Frances Barth (born 1946) is an American visual artist best known for paintings situated between abstraction, landscape and mapping, and in her later career, video and narrative works. She emerged during a period in which contemporary painters sought a way forward beyond 1960s minimalism and conceptualism, producing work that combined modernist formalism, geometric abstraction, referential elements and metaphor. Critic Karen Wilkin wrote, "Barth's paintings play a variety of spatial languages against each other, from aerial views that suggest mapping, to suggestions of perspectival space, to relentless flatness ... [she] questions the very pictorial conventions she deploys, creating ambiguous imagery and equally ambiguous space that seems to shift as we look."

Barth has been recognized with a Guggenheim Fellowship and Anonymous Was a Woman Award, among others. She has exhibited at the Museum of Modern Art (MoMA), the Dallas Museum of Art, and in the Whitney and Venice Biennials. Her work belongs to the public collections of the Metropolitan Museum of Art, MoMA, and Whitney Museum, among others. She is director emerita of the Mount Royal School of Art at the Maryland Institute College of Art (MICA).

== Early life and career ==
Barth was born in the Bronx, New York in 1946. In the 1960s, she attended Hunter College, earning a BFA and MA in painting and art history. Her early interests extended to sculpture (including studies with Tony Smith), movement and music; after taking a modern dance workshop at Hunter, she performed in works by Yvonne Rainer and Joan Jonas between 1968 and 1976.

Barth gained early recognition through several survey exhibitions in the 1970s. Curator Marcia Tucker included her in the Whitney Museum's 1972 painting annual and 1973 biennial; the shows led to a 1974 solo exhibition and representation with Susan Caldwell Gallery. Barth also appeared in "American Painting: The Eighties" (1979, curated by Barbara Rose), "American Paintings of the 1970s" (Albright-Knox Art Gallery, 1979), and focused group shows at the Contemporary Arts Museum Houston and Corcoran Gallery of Art. In subsequent years, she exhibited at Tomoko Liguori, Sundaram Tagore and Silas Von Morisse in New York, Jan Cicero Gallery (Chicago), and Marcia Wood (Atlanta), among others.

Frances Barth, Susan Caldwell Gallery exhibition, 1976; Mokroe (left), acrylic on canvas, 72" x 140", diptych; Artoosh (right), acrylic on canvas, 72" x 202", triptych.

== Painting ==
Since the early 1970s, Barth has explored the possibilities of meaning and metaphor within abstract paintings employing complex pictorial spaces and multiple points of view. Her work frequently combines flatness and volume, delicately indeterminate color, and a sense of unstable space and scale, often in long horizontal formats that require viewers to "read" (and re-read) them slowly, from left to right.

In her first major solo show (Susan Caldwell, 1974), Barth exhibited 10' to 16'-long horizontal paintings focused on color, movement and gravity, which evolved from common geometric shapes such as triangles, trapezoids and circles. The scumbled, scratchy forms functioned as both objects and atmosphere and suggested gently moving planes shifting places (e.g., Vermillion, 1973). By 1978, she was producing increasingly complex, mural-like arrays that Artforum described as "long, narrow, friezelike compositions of alternating circular and triangular forms, advancing, receding, stretching out beyond vision" (e.g., Mariner, 1977). The successive transformation of shapes established a sense of temporality and furthered the dichotomy between surface design and pictorial depth in her work.

Frances Barth, After Midnight, acrylic on canvas, 96" x 48", 1997.

Beginning in the 1980s, Barth began to add referential forms and markers to her geometric shapes, incorporating new spatial and graphic languages—aerial mapping symbols, schematic diagrams, perspectival rendering, modeling, pure flatness—that provoked multiple of readings of the work. Art in America termed her 1983 exhibition a deliberate "stylistic leap" toward "geometric landscape" with a "deeper, decidedly illusionist space" inhabited by volumetric forms and softer colors (e.g., Seventh New Year, 1983). In 1989, New York Times critic Roberta Smith wrote that Barth's "works have lately opened up into strangely angular landscapes, as abstract as they are imagistic and as gestural as they are structured." Writers have described these works as both linear "narratives" translating the slow movement of geologic time (e.g., the development of faults or forming of canyons) and as credible, panoramic depictions of landscapes and experiences—including light and time of day—achieved through a subtle and informed use of abstract color.

In the 1990s, Barth incorporated classical Japanese influences into her paintings, while continuing to counterpoint Western illusionism against modernist flatness. The Eastern inspirations were borne out in the work's rudimentary landscape imagery, canted perspectives, balance of planar and linear elements, and muted, economical palettes of dusty color. Critics characterized the paintings as highly individualistic, puzzling, "thoughtful improvisations," noting their juxtaposition of decoration, carefully gridded organization and calligraphic spontaneity (e.g., L. Rides West, 1993). Art Papers described works such as sal.-v (1997) as "rapt with quietude, intent on describing [the] experience of a moment of recognition."

Reviewers of Barth's shows between 2006 and 2011 often focused on what Joan Waltemath called a "dialectical approach" mixing divergent syntactic codes, perspectives and unstable scales to produce works simultaneously evoking mysterious terrains, geologic schematics, and "near-minimal abstraction." David Brody described the collage-like interplay in Barth's 2017 exhibition (e.g., in Yellow Yellow, 2016 or Olive, 2017) as a place "precisely balanced between lucidity and mystery" in which "an absorbing world of imagination might also be a quirky transcription of observable facts." He made particular note of the interaction between her paintings and new sequential work (animations and a graphic novel), suggesting the latter works brought "into the open longstanding internal disputes" at the core of her practice, notably, "an implicit argument between abstraction and narrative, between stillness and forward motion."

== Video, animation and narrative works ==
Since 2007, Barth has created two animations (End of the Day, End of the Day, 2007; and Jonnie in the Lake, 2016), two documentaries (Regina, 2013, about painter Regina Bogat; and The Audition, 2018), and two narrative short films (No No Boy, 2015; and Dreaming Tango, 2020). In 2017, she published the graphic novel Ginger Smith and Billy Gee, which featured settings derived from her paintings. Barth was a guest panelist in a 1975 episode of Firing Line with William F. Buckley Jr. featuring Tom Wolfe, discussing his then-recent book The Painted Word.

== Awards and collections ==
Barth has received a Guggenheim Fellowship (1977), awards from the Joan Mitchell Foundation (1995) and American Academy of Arts and Letters (1999, 2004), and grants from the National Endowment for the Arts (1974), Adolph and Esther Gottlieb Foundation (1993), Anonymous Was a Woman (2006) and Pollock-Krasner Foundation (2017), among others. In 2011, she was elected to the National Academy of Design.

Her work belongs to the public collections of the Museum of Modern Art, Metropolitan Museum of Art, Whitney Museum, Akron Art Institute, Albright-Knox Art Gallery, Cincinnati Art Museum, Dallas Museum of Fine Art, Davis Museum, Herbert F. Johnson Museum of Art, Minneapolis Institute of Art, Newark Museum, and Tucson Museum of Art, among others.
