= James Pringle Cook =

American painter (born 1947)

- Born: 1947 (age 78–79); Topeka, Kansas, U.S.
- Education: Wichita State University, Emporia State University
- Known for: Painting, Landscapes
- Style: Expressionist, Representational
- Spouse: DeAnn Melton
- Website: James Pringle Cook

James Pringle Cook (born 1947) is an American painter based in Tucson, Arizona, known nationally for expressive, monumental landscapes and urban scenes that employ vigorous brushwork and thick, impasto surfaces and move between realism and passages of abstraction. He has explored a wide range of geographies across the United States and subjects from craggy mountains and seascapes to industrial accidents to the figure. Curators and critics, however, generally agree that his work is as much about pure painting as it is about his convincing recapitulations of the world and a sense of place. Museum Director Robert Yassin described Cook as "a painter who is in love with painting [whose] bravura use of paint is akin to the abstract expressionists; unlike them, however, he provides viewers with a recognizable reality, ordered by his own personal vision and controlled by his technical mastery." Discussing his urban works, Margaret Regan wrote, "Cook is so skilled a painter he can turn almost anything into a thing of beauty […] His bravura handling of the paint is what matters: his pure layers of color, slabbed in thick gobs onto his linen canvases with a palette knife, glistening like butter."

Cook has exhibited throughout the United States and in Canada in more than seventy solo exhibitions, including shows at the Tucson Museum of Art, Albrecht-Kemper Museum of Art and Roswell Museum and Art Center, and group exhibits at the San Francisco Museum of Modern Art and Wichita Art Museum, among many. His work has been featured in Arts Magazine, American Artist and New American Paintings (vol. 12, 24, 36), major newspapers including the Chicago Tribune, Arizona Daily Star, Philadelphia Inquirer and The New Mexican, and television news features in Dallas, Phoenix and Tucson. More than seventy museum and public collections hold Cook's work, including the Denver Art Museum, Phoenix Art Museum, and Milwaukee Art Museum.

James Pringle Cook, Whisper #2 (triptych), oil on linen, 60" x 210", 2013.

== Life and career ==
Cook was born in Topeka, Kansas, in 1947, and raised in the Kansas's Flint Hills ranching country. After taking art classes at Washburn University at an early age, he honed his skills painting stage flats for high school theater productions. He studied painting and printmaking at Emporia State University with artist Richard Slimon, receiving BA and MA degrees in art, before attending Wichita State University and earning an MFA in 1972. Throughout his studies, Cook resisted the dominant minimalist and abstract art currents of the day, painting figurative and landscape works influenced by Cézanne, Monet, Albert Bierstadt, George Bellows, and Bay Area figuration. In 1972, he took an Assistant Professor position at the University of Arizona, drawn to the region's geography, openness to representational work, and conduciveness to plein air (outdoor) painting. He taught painting, drawing and readings in contemporary art courses there for six years, before leaving to work full-time at painting; two years later, a successful exhibition at Frumkin/Struve Gallery in Chicago cemented his belief that he could make a living at art.

In 1992, Cook won the prestigious Stonewall Show, a solo exhibition at the Tucson Museum of Art awarded annually to a regional artist. He has also shown at the Albrecht-Kemper Museum of Art, Roswell Museum and Art Center and Mulvane Art Museum, and in group exhibits at the Minnesota Museum of Art, Eiteljorg Museum of American Indians and Western Art, and Joslyn Art Museum, among many. He has been represented in New York City by Peter Tatistcheff; in Chicago by the Allan Frumkin, Frumkin/Struve and Jan Cicero galleries; and in Montréal, currently, by Beaux-Arts des Ameriques. In the west, he has shown with Gail Severn Gallery since 1993, as well as with William Havu Gallery, Altamira Gallery, Davis Dominguez Gallery, J. Willott Gallery, South Wind Gallery and others. Cook works and lives with his wife, artist DeAnn Melton, and family in Tucson.

== Work ==
Cook's work has been described as an individualistic, unpretentious "balance of realism, abstract expressionism and impressionism"—a designation somewhat borne out by artists he names as key influences: J. M. W. Turner, Manet, Monet, Willem de Kooning, Richard Diebenkorn, and Frank Auerbach. Other writers situate his work in an American tradition that runs through 19th century Western landscape painters Albert Bierstadt and Frederick Church, the Winslow Homer's seascapes, and George Luks and George Bellows, which Cook goes beyond with an unmistakably contemporary, unromantic perspective.

James Pringle Cook, Morgan's Point (diptych), oil on linen, 78" x 192", 1995-6.

Critics have observed that Cook's uncompromising artistic vision and approach place signature works, such as Whisper #2 (2013) or Morgan's Point (1995–6), in a breach between cutting edge and traditional, and abstraction and realism, that transcends labels and welcomes "art conservatives and iconoclasts alike." As his work has evolved away from an early, tighter realism toward a more painterly approach incorporating the dimension of time and flux, this has been increasingly true. Cook has stated, "the tension between the two poles [of realism and abstraction] has always been the thing that enlivens my work," and that he feels most connected to "the painterly tradition, the language of the brush" and artists—realist or abstract—"trying to make something exciting happen on the surface."

Cook's process generally begins with a visit to a location—favorites include the Arizona mountains, the rolling hills of Kansas, and Idaho's Silver Creek Preserve—where he sketches plein air, usually in oil. After reviewing the sketches in the studio, he puts them aside to create drawings and studies based on his memory and experience of the place, which inspire large canvasses. In a nod to 19th-century tradition, he begins by laying out a grisaille—a black and white underpainting—that blocks out the composition and establishes the structure within which he applies his furious paint handling and atmospheric effects. Nonetheless, Cook maintains that his work "is more choreographed than planned," a view echoed by writers who describe his vigorous brushstrokes as "almost musical in their composition."

James Pringle Cook, Equinox #1 09, oil on linen, 42" x 70", 2011.

Cook paints quickly, attacking the linen surface with bold lines and richly colored bursts of thick paint applied with brushes and trowels, often dragging tools through the wet paint to create crevices and lines. Up close, images such as Equinox 09 #1 (2011) or Whisper #2 break down into small strokes of color and complex, textural, almost sculptural surfaces; from afar they coalesce into recognizable, often realistic images whose power and energy matches the majestic, natural physicality being depicted. However, Cook is equally enthralled by man-made environments, as in works like Morgan's Point, which often seem to allude to both the power and awe of industry and the costs. Writers such as curator Stephen Vollmer note that, like Turner (and Monet), Cook is especially captivated by light and atmospheric effects, capturing the ephemerality of skies dissolving into billowing clouds, rushing water (e.g., Blue River Cascade), smoke, and reflections of trees or fire on water (e.g., Lake Charles #2). Cook has said, simply, "I love visual beauty [...] I am convinced that is the most important thing I can do, to make my pictures as wonderful to look at as they can be."

== Collections ==
Cook's work is held in numerous museum collections, including the Denver Art Museum, Phoenix Art Museum, Museum of Contemporary Art, Osaka, Tucson Museum of Art, Milwaukee Art Museum, Eiteljorg Museum, Wichita Art Museum, Des Moines Art Center, New Mexico Museum of Fine Art, Boise Art Museum, Illinois State Museum, and Roswell Museum and Art Center, as well as in nearly fifty public collections.
