= Oliver Arms =

American painter (born 1970)

Oliver Arms (born 1970) is an American painter based in Los Angeles, California.

== Education ==
Oliver Arms attended the San Francisco Art Institute from 1988 to 1991.

== Works ==
Arms is primarily known for his labor-intensive oil paintings which are created by repeatedly building up then sanding down multiple layers of oil paint on canvas over the course of many months. Arms claims his work dealt with the compounding of time and information as a pollutant. In an interview with Price Latimer Agah in 2009, Arms said of his work: "What I'm left with is an inundation because of so many layers sanded down, an inundation that in some pale fashion tries to compete, in terms of information overload, back to the thing that stimulated it." His work is included in the Frederick R. Weisman Art Foundation in Los Angeles. Some of his most recognizable work included:

- "1975," 2011–2012, Oil on canvas, 48 x 36 inches, 121.9 x 91. cm
- "Denn die Todten reiten schnell (for the dead travel fast)," 2008–09, Oil on canvas, diptych, 84 x 144 inches, 213.4 x 365.8 cm
- "Cuando Amanezca, Entonces Verás," 2012, Oil on canvas, 84 x 72 inches, 213.4 x 182.9 cm
- "Crocodile," 2011–2012, Oil on canvas, 72 x 72 inches, 182.9 x 182.9 cm

== Exhibitions ==
He held his first solo exhibition at Western Project in Los Angeles in 2005, following with a show at the Charles Cowles Gallery in New York in 2007.

David Pagel, in his Los Angeles Times review for Arms's third exhibition in 2008 at Western Project, states Arms's work is an "eloquent essay on the most elemental aspects of the organic materiality of oil paint. Simultaneously fluid, crusty and ethereal, his primal pictures have one foot firmly planted in the primordial ooze and the other in the cultivated world of modernist abstraction. It's a feat that balances furious energy and strange serenity."

Arms continued with a solo exhibition at Ameringer/McEnery/Yohe in New York in 2010.

In April 2012, Arms showed a body of work for his second exhibition at Ameringer/McEnery/Yohe in New York.

The Orange County Museum of Art included Arms's work in "OC Collects", which ran from October 7, 2012 - January 1, 2013.

In January 2014, Ameringer/McEnery/Yohe hosted Arms's work concurrent with a Hans Hoffman exhibition.

In January 2018, a survey of Arms's paintings were presented for the inaugural exhibition at the newly formed gallery Jason Haam in Seoul, South Korea.

In January 2021, Arms held his second solo exhibition at Jason Haam in Seoul, South Korea.
