= Laurie Fendrich =

American artist, writer and educator

- Born: 1948 (age 76–77); Paterson, New Jersey, US
- Education: School of the Art Institute of Chicago, Mount Holyoke College
- Known for: Painting, drawing
- Style: Geometric abstraction
- Spouse: Peter Plagens
- Website: Laurie Fendrich

Laurie Fendrich, I Met a Boy Called Frank Mills, oil on canvas, 36" x 32", 2009.

Laurie Fendrich (born 1948) is an American artist, writer and educator based in New York City, best known for geometric abstract paintings that balance playfulness and sophistication. Her work has been featured in solo exhibitions in New York, Los Angeles and Chicago, a retrospective at the Williamson Gallery at Scripps College (2010), and group shows at MoMA PS1, the Los Angeles County Museum of Art, and the National Academy of Design, among many venues. She has received reviews in publications including The New York Times, Artforum, Art in America, Arts Magazine, ARTnews Partisan Review, and New York Magazine. Fendrich has been awarded fellowships from the Guggenheim Foundation (2016), Brown Foundation at the Museum of Fine Arts, Houston (2009, 2017), and National Endowment for the Arts (1983–4). She has been an educator for more than four decades, notably at Hofstra University (1989–2014), and a regular essayist for The Chronicle Review at The Chronicle of Higher Education. She a member of American Abstract Artists.

Fendrich's art has been described as a "deft blending of mid-twentieth century Cubism and biomorphism" that avoids easy harmony, playing a pictorial game of "part playground, part calculated wager against chaos." Critic Hilton Kramer characterized her work as "devoid of solemnity, dogmatism and existential angst," with an undercurrent of humor that embraces the worldly as it renegotiates the relationship between abstraction and representation in modernist painting.

== Life and career ==
Fendrich was born in Paterson, New Jersey in 1948 and attended Mount Holyoke College, where she studied painting, but graduated with a political science degree (1970), considering it a more practical major. She worked in publishing for three years, traveled across the country, and in 1975, enrolled at the School of the Art Institute of Chicago (MFA, 1978), where she studied painting with professors Ray Yoshida and Richard Loving. She met her future husband, artist and critic Peter Plagens, in Chicago; they would marry in 1981 and, after living in California and Chapel Hill, North Carolina, move to New York City in 1985.

Fendrich has shown in museums, universities and galleries across the U.S., notably solo exhibitions at John Davis and E. M. Donahue in New York (1990s), Jan Cicero in Chicago (1981–1993), Gary Snyder Fine Art and Katharina Rich Perlow in New York (2000s), and Louis Stern Fine Arts in Los Angeles (2016). She lives and works in New York City and Callicoon Center, New York, and shares a studio with Plagens.

== Work ==
Critics identify Fendrich as an artist whose work makes a case for the viability of geometric abstraction and the modernist tradition, while simultaneously taking a knowing jab at its quest for purity. Fendrich notes her inclination toward a Platonic, "modernist, optimistic spirit that strives for the eternal and universal." She cites 1930s American artists Stuart Davis and George L. K. Morris, Esphyr Slobodkina, and Russian Constructivism as influences; other touchstones include Cubist Juan Gris, early American comics, and Jane Austen. Art historian Mark Stevens likened Fendrich's sensibility to Austen's tempered mix of passion, reason and humor, a balancing act others observe makes Fendrich's work "hum with friction" as it seeks a "fusion of rationality and emotion, order and ardor," freedom and limitation, stasis and dynamism.

Laurie Fendrich, My Own Dolly, oil on canvas, 40" x 34", 2018.

=== Painting ===
In her early work, Fendrich created large abstractions dominated by triangular forms and tonal contrast, seeking, in her words, to "make the most eye-grabbing, dynamic painting … while not sacrificing harmony and balance." In the 1990s, she reduced her work's scale in reaction against the bombastic art of the day, and crucially, discovered Russian Constructivism and the oval and irregular bulbous forms of her mature work, which posed greater compositional challenges. Since that time, her vocabulary of interlocking, jigsaw–puzzle shapes orbiting complex, off-kilter compositions has remained fairly consistent. Her later work (e.g., My Own Dolly, 2018), which Art in America called "her jauntiest, most complex and absorbing ever," has broadened to include near-cartoony forms alluding to the figure and Pop art, a more subdued palette, variation in the scale of shapes, and airier compositions.

Critics such as Karen Wilkin identify color as a defining aspect of Fendrich's work, describing her palette as inventive, "a little off," carnivalesque, riotous, and "slightly postmodern" in its "peculiar shades," while acknowledging its key role in creating harmony in her paintings. For Fendrich, color and composition are one. She introduces tension through unexpected color pairings, diagonals, ambiguous figure-ground relationships, and contained fields whose shapes bump the picture edges like balls ricocheting on a billiard table—then painstakingly resolves it through "an obsessive tinkering with color and mass."

Laurie Fendrich, 16B, Conté crayon on Arches paper, 24" x 18" (image size 16" x 14"), 2016.

While committed to overall harmony and an ideal of perfect geometric form, Fendrich injects the warmth, spontaneity and quirkiness of the human touch through her handling of paint and form. She insists on hand-rendering all shapes (even squares), creating quivering, soft edges and texture, and allows areas of irregular color and underpainting to be revealed. Her eccentric, biomorphic shapes—which just barely suggest eyes, noses, cartoon profiles, pots and other worldly things—add levity and wit through their "familial" interactions and allusions. Critic Donald Kuspit, however, wrote that while the work was "lovely to look at," it summarized the innovations of its predecessors rather than breaking new ground.

=== Drawing ===
Fendrich began creating black-and-white Conté crayon works in the 1990s, inspired by a show of Seurat drawings. Works in their own right rather than studies for paintings, the drawings have been exhibited in four solo shows. The drawings resemble her paintings in their puzzle-like construction, sense of musicality, and droll anthropomorphic shapes, but differ in their exploration of nuanced tone and stippled texture, and in their approach, which is subtractive rather than additive (as the painting are). Critics describe her process as "a tightrope walk" in which she must carefully eliminate the white of the paper (always leaving some in the final work), because it can never be brought back.

== Writing ==
Fendrich's writing began with the publication of an essay in The Chronicle of Higher Education (1999) entitled, "Why Painting Still Matters," which later became the basis for a short book. Since then, she has regularly contributed to The Chronicle and for five years was a blogger for "Brainstorm", the Chronicle's blog site that ran from 2007-2012. In addition, she has contributed essays and reviews to The Common Review. Her topics range from the role of art and artists in society, abstraction in contemporary art, art education, art criticism, and individual artists such as Picasso, Matisse and Anselm Kiefer. She also contributed an essay on the philosophy of painting to an anthology in honor of the political philosopher Thomas L. Pangle. She has written exhibition catalogue essays for artists including Judith Geichman, Don Gummer and Doug Hilson.

== Teaching ==
Fendrich has taught painting, drawing and contemporary art theory for more than four decades, emphasizing foundational skills and often drawing on her philosophy background. She was an Instructor at the University of Houston (1978–79) and University of Southern California, Los Angeles (1979-80), before joining the faculty at Art Center College of Design in Pasadena from 1980–5. In 1989, she began teaching at Hofstra University, where she served in various appointments until 2014, including Professor, Director of the Comparative Arts and Culture MA Program, and since then, Professor Emerita of Fine Arts and Art History.

Fendrich has also been a visiting artist, lecturer and panelist at numerous institutions, including the Pratt Institute, Whitney Museum of American Art, University of California, Davis, School of the Art Institute of Chicago, San Francisco Art Institute, Colorado State University, and Irish Arts Council, among many others.
