= Girl in Mirror =

Painting by Roy Lichtenstein

- Artist: Roy Lichtenstein
- Year: 1964
- Movement: Pop art
- Location: 8 to 10 editions

Girl in Mirror (sometimes Girl in the Mirror) is a 1964 porcelain-enamel-on-steel pop art painting by Roy Lichtenstein that is considered to exist in between eight and ten editions. One edition was part of a $14 million 2012 lawsuit regarding a 2009 sale, while another sold in 2010 for $4.9 million. Although it uses Ben-Day dots like many other Lichtenstein works, it was inspired by the New York City Subway rather than directly from a panel of a romance comics work.

== Analysis ==
Girl in Mirror uses Ben-Day dots like many of his other works, but it was inspired by the hard reflective finish of signs in the New York City Subway system and, in turn, they inspired his subsequent ceramic head works. Enamel facilitated a more mechanical appearance than even his paintings while remaining in two dimensions. After 1963, Lichtenstein's comics-based women "... look hard, crisp, brittle, and uniformly modish in appearance, as if they all came out of the same pot of makeup." This particular example is one of several that is cropped so closely that the hair flows beyond the edges of the canvas.

== Editions ==
One edition of this painting was the subject of a legal dispute involving 2009 sale without consent. Another edition of this work sold at auction at Christie's (New York, Rockefeller Plaza ) Post-War and Contemporary Evening Sale for $4,898,500 (premium) on November 10, 2010 although it was only expected to sell in the $3–4 million range. Girl in Mirror exists in eight editions according to most, however, "Clare Bell of the Roy Lichtenstein Foundation said that inventory records for the Leo Castelli Gallery, where Lichtenstein showed in the 1960s, say that there may be 10 versions of the work, some of them original proofs". One edition exhibited at the Gagosian Gallery in New York in 2008. There had been three previous auction sales of this work: May 5, 1986 at Sotheby's New York for $ 100,000 USD (hammer), May 4, 1987 at Sotheby's New York for $150,000 USD (hammer), and May 15, 2007 Sotheby's New York for $3,600,000 (hammer)/$4,072,000 (premium).

== 2012 lawsuit ==
On January 18, 2012, a suit was filed in Manhattan in New York State Court in a case related to two earlier federal cases. The suit alleges both lack of consent and fraudulent misrepresentation of the painting's condition. The suit was for $14 million, including $10 million in punitive damages. 93-year-old Jan Cowles claims that in 2008 her son, New York art dealer Charles Cowles, transferred a version of Girl in Mirror to Larry Gagosian for sale without her consent. The suit claims that Gagosian fraudulently claimed the painting was damaged and sold it between August and December 2009 for $2 million, while charging a $1 million commission, rather than sell at or above the $3 million low estimate for a negotiated commission of $500,000. As a result of the edition shown during the summer 2008 "Roy Lichtenstein: Girls" exhibition at the Gagosian Gallery, at one point the gallery was in possession of two editions of Girl in Mirror, one of which was damaged. The intake notes for the Cowles version indicate no damage and Gagosian's international marketing of the work was consistent with the undamaged condition.

== Reception ==
The New York Times notes that this was an example of Lichtenstein's ability to "glorify the American woman by giving innocuous images of her generic concocted self and her roiling emotions such blazing formal power". Framing a small fragment of the image in the mirror serves an artistic purpose. "Extraordinary sections like ... linking the falling hair to the semi-reflected face of the girl in the mirror (Girl in the mirror, 1964) ... which cut up, analyse, and unite, all have the one aim of intensifying the signifying fragment."

== See also ==
- 1964 in art
