= Arzel =

Arzel is a surname. It may refer to:

- Alphonse Arzel (1927–2014), French politician and senator
- Gildas Arzel (born 1961), French singer, songwriter, composer and multi-instrumentalist musician

== See also ==
- Marguerite Lamour, birth name Marguerite Arzel, French politician and mayor
