= Howard Ben Tré =

American glass artist (1949–2020)

- Born: May 13, 1949; Brooklyn, New York City, New York, U.S.
- Died: June 20, 2020 (aged 71); Pawtucket, Rhode Island, U.S.
- Education: Portland State University; Rhode Island School of Design
- Known for: Glass-making
- Awards: National Endowment for the Arts Fellowship; Boston Society of Architects, Art & Architecture Collaboration Award
- Patrons: Ben W. Heineman Sr.
- Website: Official website

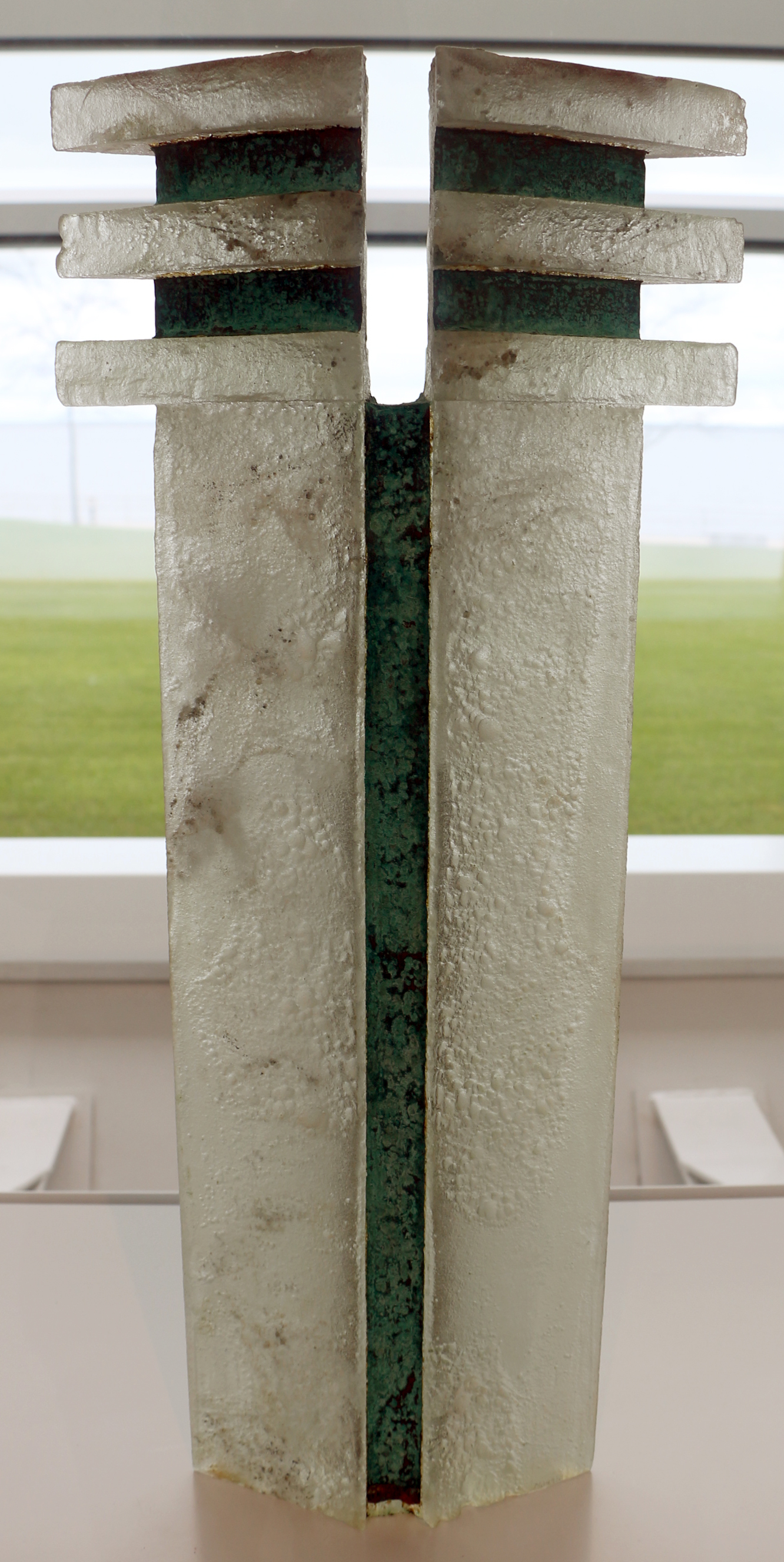
Glass vase, 1985

Howard Ben Tré (May 13, 1949 - June 20, 2020) was an American glass artist. He worked with poured glass, creating small sculptures and large scale public artworks. Glass magazine has called Ben Tré a pioneer in the technique of using hot glass casting in fine art.

== Personal life and education ==
Howard Ben Tré was born May 13, 1949, in Brooklyn, New York and grew up in Rockaway Park, Queens. In the 1960s he attended Brooklyn College for two years and was a political activist.

In the 1970s he left New York with his wife, Gay, for Oregon. At Portland State University he learned about the university's well-known glass-blowing shop and began studying the creation process, finding influence in religious objects. He would obtain his bachelor's degree at Portland State. Dale Chihuly recruited Ben Tré to the Rhode Island School of Design (RISD) from Portland, Oregon where he would graduate with a Masters of Fine Arts in 1980.

His wife Gay Ben Tré was actively involved in planning and siting the installation of his art. They divorced amicably and remained friends for the rest of his life. He married Wendy MacGaw in 2004. He lived and worked in Pawtucket, Rhode Island.

Howard Ben Tré died June 20, 2020, in hospice care at his home in Pawtucket, Rhode Island.

== Artistic career ==
He started blowing glass. Through his education at Portland State University, he would discover the process of pouring glass. Pulling inspiration from African and Japanese religious icons and figures, he uses his artwork to explore connections between the two.

Ben Tré utilized his training as an industrial manufacturing master technician to create glass artworks based on traditional methods. His studio space, located in Pawtucket, Rhode Island is where he designed, made molds and completed his work. He created fine art castings by pouring molten glass into sand molds, applying heat and then cooling them for months. The form is then dug out from the sand mold, sand blasted, cut, ground, and polished. Many of Ben Tré's works involve the use of gold leaf; by way of wrapping portions of works or installing lead bars within the pieces covered with gold leaf. The glass sculptures are often symmetrical. His wife, Gay, assisted in the designing and planning of his large scale works, including the installation of his public art.

=== Reception ===
In lieu of Ben Tré's 2001 exhibition at the Orange County Museum of Art, critic Roberta Carasso described his work as being "part of the glass revolution". The Christian Science Monitor described his poured glass works as timeless, monumental and "hulking, architectural forms he creates...existed before the dawn of recorded history." Arthur Danto stated in 2000 that Ben Tré's glass works were redefining and powerful, and that he creates "a kind of pleasure that we don't usually associate with art."

=== Notable collections & installations ===
- Caryatids, 1998, Hunter Museum of American Art, Chattanooga, Tennessee
- Immanent Circumstance, 1991, Norman Leventhal Park, Boston, Massachusetts
- Kira's Benches, 2007, Hood Museum of Art, Hanover, New Hampshire
- Mantled Figure, 1993, Rhode Island School of Design Museum, Providence, Rhode Island
- Siphon, 1989, Metropolitan Museum of Art, New York, New York
- Untitled, Artery Plaza, Bethesda, Maryland
- Various works; Corning Museum of Glass, Corning, New York
- Water Forest, Museum of Glass, Tacoma, Washington

=== Notable exhibitions ===
- Design Visions, 1992, Art Gallery of Western Australia, Perth, Australia
- Masters of Contemporary Glass, 1997, Indianapolis Museum of Art, Indianapolis, Indiana
- Interior/Exterior, 2000, Palm Springs Desert Museum, Palm Springs, California
- Howard Ben Tré: Sculpting Space in the Public Realm, 2001, Minneapolis Institute of Arts, Minneapolis, Minnesota
- Solo exhibition; 2002, Charles Cowles Gallery, New York, New York
- Private Visions, Utopian Ideals: The Art of Howard Ben Tré, 2005, State University of New York at Buffalo, Buffalo, New York
