= Alphonse Arzel =

French politician (1927–2014)

- Born: 20 September 1927; Lestrehoné, Ploudalmézeau, Brittany, France
- Died: 21 February 2014 (aged 86); Lestrehoné, Ploudalmézeau, Brittany, France
- Occupations: Farmer and politician
- Title: Mayor of Ploudalmézeau
- Term: 1961–2001
- Political party: Union for French Democracy

Alphonse Arzel (20 September 1927 – 21 February 2014 in Ploudalmézeau, Finistère) was a French politician, a member of the French Senate representing the department of Finistère, mayor of Ploudalmézeau, and president of the Association of the mayors of Finistère (AMF 29).

== Career ==
A farmer by profession, he made his political debut with the Christian Farmers Youth association Jeunesse agricole chrétienne (JAC). Elected mayor of Ploudalmézeau in 1961, he was re-elected five times until the French municipal elections of 2001, when he left politics and was succeeded by Marguerite Lamour.

In 1978, following the sinking of the Amoco Cadiz off the coast of Portsall (the port near Ploudalmézeau) and the resulting oil spill, he became an active advocate both on behalf of some ninety towns and villages along the contaminated coasts.

Arzel founded the Joint Union for the protection and conservation of the northwest coast of Brittany in 1980 (which became in 2000) and led the fight which was eventually resolved in 1992, after a trial in Chicago, USA, with Amoco being found at fault and required to pay compensation to the communities and individuals affected by the oil spill.

== See also ==
- Ploudalmézeau
- Amoco Cadiz
