= George Cohen (artist) =

20th-century American painter and academic

- Born: George Marshall Cohen; August 4, 1919; Chicago, Illinois, U.S.
- Died: April 18, 1999 (aged 79)
- Education: School of the Art Institute of Chicago (BFA); Drake University (attended); University of Chicago (MA, PhD)
- Movement: Chicago Imagists
- Spouse: Constance Teander

George Marshall Cohen (August 4, 1919 – April 18, 1999) was an American painter and art professor. He was a member of the Chicago-based Monster Roster group of artists and taught art at Northwestern University.

== Early life and education ==
Cohen was born on August 4, 1919, in Chicago. He studied at the School of the Art Institute of Chicago, where he was awarded the Isaacs Scholarship in 1938–1939 and the Coolbaugh Scholarship in 1939–1940. He also served as the President of the Art Students League of New York in 1940.

Cohen's academic career was interrupted between 1941 and 1946 while he served in the U.S. Army with the 63rd Reconnaissance Troop in the European Theatre of Operations. After completing his BFA at the Chicago Art Institute in 1946, Cohen briefly attended Drake University, where he studied Liberal Arts. At the University of Chicago, he completed residence work toward an MA and a PhD in the History of Art from 1946 to 1948.

== Career ==
In 1948, Cohen joined the Northwestern University faculty as an instructor of art. He was promoted to assistant professor of art in 1952 and to associate professor in 1958. He became a full professor in 1963, a position he held until his retirement in 1984, when he became professor emeritus. As guest professor or guest artist, Cohen also taught at the Contemporary Art Workshop in Chicago in 1951, the Institute of Related Art in Wilmette in 1951, the Evanston Art Center from 1951 to 1952, the Institute of Design, Illinois Institute of Technology from 1956 to 1957, and the Minneapolis Museum of Art, 1963.

At Northwestern University, Cohen was a President’s Fellow and Distinguished Faculty Lecturer. His numerous awards included the Copley Award, the National Foundation of the Arts Award, a Ford Arts Council Award, a Guggenheim Fellowship and the State of Illinois 150th Anniversary Award.

Cohen wrote many articles and reviews for various publications. He had many one-person shows and participated in numerous invitational exhibitions. His work can be found in permanent collections, including the Museum of Contemporary Art, the Museum of Modern Art in New York, the San Francisco Museum of Modern Art, the Carnegie Mellon Museum in Pittsburgh, the Minneapolis Museum of American Arts and the Hirschhorn Collection in Washington, D.C.

== Personal life ==
Cohen was married to the painter Constance Teander Cohen (February 11, 1921 – February 14, 1995). They often showed their work together in exhibits. He had a son, Paul E. Cohen and two daughters, Frances Tietov and Susan Evans. Cohen and his wife, lived in an Evanston 19-century house filled with paintings, books, and musical instruments (two of their three children, Susan and Frances, are professional classical musicians).

== Artistic practice ==
Cohen worked in oils and mixed media. A Northwestern University faculty profile describes Cohen as "a surrealist" who "combines the metaphysical with the sensuous to express new realities of space, time, and the human figure". Cohen was a founding member of the Museum of Contemporary Art in Chicago. In the mid-fifties, he was also a part of a "new Chicago School" that included artists Leon Golub, June Leaf and Cosmo Campoli. They organized annual "Momentum Exhibitions" that caught the notice of New York critics. (See clippings from Art News, October 1955; Arts, January 1955.)

George Cohen became known in the forties and fifties for his paintings and board constructions with objects and mirrors affixed to them. He is considered a major influence on and harbinger of the Chicago Imagists, as well as an important contributor nationally to developments in painting in the fifties and sixties. He received many awards and prizes, including the National Endowment for the Arts and the Guggenheim, and his art is owned by private and corporate collectors as well as the Museum of Modern Art in New York, the Art Institute of Chicago, and the Carnegie Institute in Pittsburgh. One of his key works, "The Serpent Chooses Adam and Eve" was at the '59 Invitational. After a 1960 trip to Rome, Cohen was influenced by Etruscan and Italian art.

Cohen showed many years with the Zabriskie Gallery and the Charles Alan Gallery in New York and with Richard L. Feigen in Chicago and New York. His most recent museum show was in 1981 at the Art Institute of Chicago, and in 1982 he exhibited his paintings at the Frumkin Struve Gallery in Chicago.
