= Jean-Marc Prouveur =

French artist and filmmaker (born 1956)

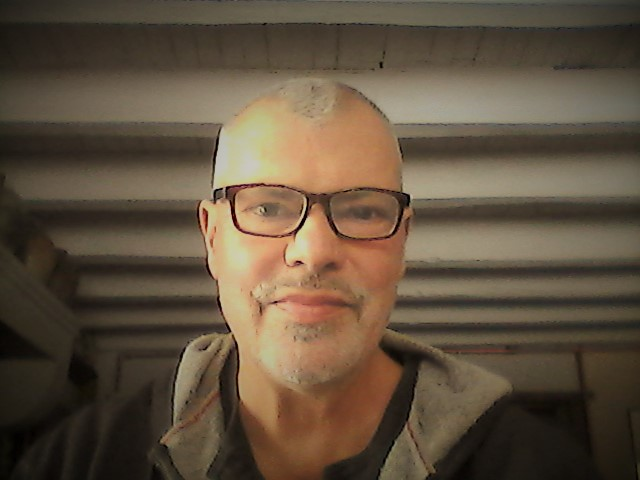
Jean-Marc Prouveur, 2021

Jean-Marc Prouveur (born 17 December 1956, Saint-Quentin, France) is a French artist and filmmaker. His work is owned by the Hungarian National Gallery, Budapest, The J. Paul Getty Museum, Los Angeles, The Victoria and Albert Museum, London and collections including those of Rodolf Nureyev and Robert Mapplethorpe. In the 1980s, he worked as a photographer, creating artworks characterized by the male nude and religious iconography. In the early 1990s, he moved into film, launching his Liquid London studio.

== Career ==
On arriving in London in 1976, Prouveur became involved in the circle of Derek Jarman, and subsequently, in the making of the 1977 film Jubilee. He also became involved with David Hockney and Rudolf Nureyev.

For much of the 1980s Prouveur worked independently in the photographic medium, creating artworks characterized by the "outlaw sexuality" of the male nude, punctuated by religious iconography, showing in London, Paris, New York City, Amsterdam, Rome and many other cities worldwide. He acknowledges artistic precedents in F. Holland Day and Wilhelm von Gloeden, and to a shared artistic preoccupation with contemporaries Robert Mapplethorpe and Gilbert and George.

In 1991 the Terrence Higgins Trust commissioned Prouveur a series of printed flyers entitled 'Tales of Gay Sex' with information on HIV transmission, photo stories depicting scenarios between gay men and a helpline for the Terrence Higgins Trust.

=== Film ===
In the early 1990s, Prouveur moved into film, launching his Liquid London studio. His early short films, Dance Macabre and the Georges Bataille-inspired Solar Anus, were elegies to AIDS; later in the decade he moved closer to pornography.

Prouveur has a natural affection for the male body, and his photographic talents aided him in transforming that love to photography and video. Liquid London started making art house films then softcore releases, but when laws in the United Kingdom changed in 1999, the studio entered the hardcore realm. And with the release of Heat & Lust — Postcards to a Pornographer, Liquid London found a new North American attention.

Prouveur believes that adult films are no different from any other genre, and therefore ought to have a comprehensive storyline to carry the viewer along within its erotic universe. "The films in general are either based on real-life characters, such as in Gamins d'Auvergne - where Jean-Marc has sought inspiration from Wilhelm von Gloeden, the 19th-century gay photographer - or on fictitious stories such as Rascals or Lust & Betrayal."

=== Inspiration ===
Prouveur's work is influenced by a wide variety of film from classic mainstream cinema on an international scale. "Many films stand out, starting with Pink Narcissus, which he saw in 1975, together with Jean Genet's Un Chant d'Amour and most of Jean Cocteau's 'films, without forgetting the avant-garde in France from the '70s: Godard, Truffaut. Or the experimental films from the States with Warhol, Morrissey, Curt McDowell and Russ Meyer."

The Italian "new wave" from the 1960s – which included directors Bernardo Bertolucci and Federico Fellini – also had an influence, followed by the new generation of filmmakers from Spain (like Pedro Almodovar) and Britain (Danny Boyle).

"So many films stand out for their sheer magic and their power to transport you into a world you could not have imagined. Guillermo del Toro is another filmmaker that stands out for Jean-Marc because of his astonishing magical tales. As for his own films, he is very proud of Gamins D' Auvergne, The Prisoner's Song, The Manor, Beast and both Legionnaires, without forgetting Polish Pleasures or Spanish Obsessions and his very first 'hardcore' movie, though he had already made over 30 erotic films prior to Lust & Betrayal. For the very same reason, he admires so-called mainstream films, with their abilities to mesmerize you and offer you a peep into someone else's universe."

== Personal life ==
He attended L'Ecole de Beaux-Arts in Cambrai from 1973 to 1976.

Prouveur now divides his time between London and Auvergne, France. He continues to experiment in photography and film whilst researching an essay on the history of pornography and its place in art.
