= Constance Teander Cohen =

American artist

Constance Teander Cohen (February 11, 1921 – February 14, 1995) was a Chicago-based American artist. Her work was first awarded at the 1948 Exhibition Momentum show. Cohen won the 1960 Logan Medal and the Armstrong Prize. She was married to artist George Cohen and died on February 14, 1995, at age 74.

Work by Constance Cohen is in the collection of the Museum of Contemporary Art (MCA) Chicago.
