= Harry Kramer (American artist) =

American painter

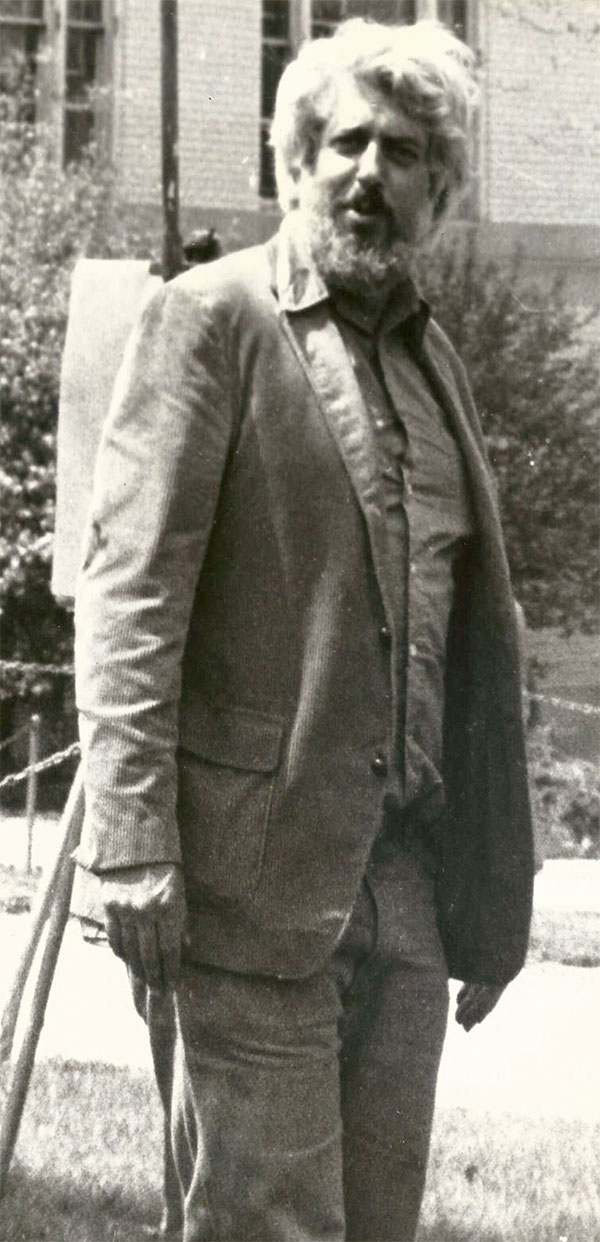
- Born: March 20, 1939 (age 87); Philadelphia, Pennsylvania, United States
- Education: University of the Arts (BFA in 1962), Yale University School of Art (MFA in 1965)
- Known for: Abstract painting and drawing
- Spouse: Trudy C. Kramer
- Website: harrykramer.net

Harry Kramer (born 1939) is an American abstract painter, born in Philadelphia, Pennsylvania. In 1962 he received a BFA from The University of Arts (formerly Philadelphia College of Art) and earned an MFA from Yale University in 1965.

== Career ==
Kramer first gained recognition in the 1970s with solo shows at the Brata Gallery and at 55 Mercer Street Gallery, critically acclaimed alternative spaces in New York City at that time. In the 1980s, his work was highlighted in “Six Painters: Gregory Armenoff, Jake Berthot, Howard Buchwald, Louise Fishman, Harry Kramer and Katherine Porter” at the Hudson River Museum with a catalog essay by the Director Peter Langlykke. This was followed by solo shows over the following decades at numerous galleries, including the Greunebaum Gallery, the Charles Cowles Gallery, and Ameringer and Yohe Gallery, all in New York City.

His work has also been included in numerous group exhibitions including the National Academy Museum (2013, 2007, 2004, 2001); Guild Hall in East Hampton, NY (2009); the Parrish Art Museum in Water Mill, NY (2014); The Hood Museum, Dartmouth College (1993); Concordia College, Bronxville, NY (1991); Barbara Kraków Gallery, Boston, MA (1987); Emily Lowe Gallery, Hofstra University, NY (1981); Detroit Institute of Arts (1976); and a major work is on permanent installation at the U.S. Federal Courthouse in Brooklyn, NY.

== Artistic style ==
In Kramer’s work, the canvas is layered with thick surfaces of paint which are interspersed with animated drawing. Vivian Rayner of the New York Times called it "muscular but not macho". Kramer’s extensive practice in drawing serves as a corollary to his paintings.

== Collections ==
Kramer’s work is represented in the collection of the Metropolitan Museum of Art, and the Brooklyn Museum.

== Awards and honors ==
Kramer was awarded a National Endowment for the Arts Fellowship in 1982. He has received grants from the Robert Lehman Foundation and the Pollock-Krasner Foundation, with two works in the online collection. He was elected to the National Academy in 1994.
