= Ron Linden =

American painter

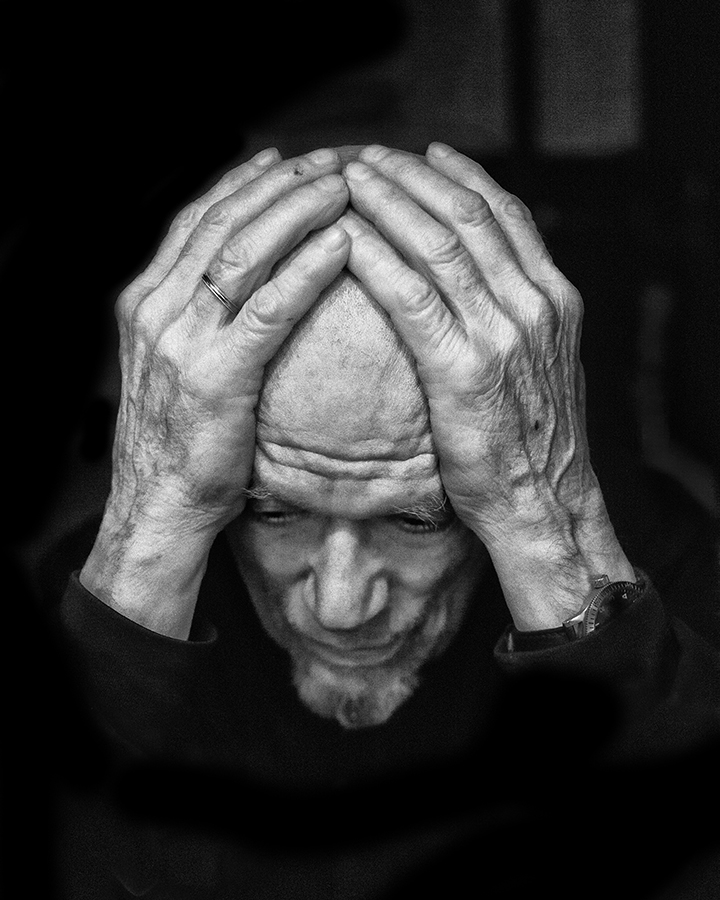
- Born: December 8, 1940 (age 85); Chicago, IL
- Known for: Painting
- Movement: Abstract expressionism
- Awards: 1978 National Endowment for the Arts, individual artist's grant in painting
- Website: Official website

Ron Linden (born 1940, Chicago, Illinois) is a California abstract painter, independent curator, and associate professor of art at Los Angeles Harbor College, Wilmington. He lives and works in the San Pedro area of Los Angeles.

== Background ==
Linden received his Bachelor of Fine Art and Masters in Fine Art at the University of Illinois. His classmates included artists William Wegman, Guy Goodwin. Louise Fishman, William Mahan, Al Loving, Robert H. Cumming, and Gerald Hayes. Linden also attended the School of the Art Institute of Chicago.

In 1972, Linden relocated to California. He worked as a scenic artist in the Hollywood film industry for 25 years. He helped establish artist communities in Pasadena, downtown Los Angeles and San Pedro, California.

In 1978, Linden received the individual artist's grant in painting from National Endowment for the Arts.

== Criticism and commentary ==
In 1975, Jeff Perone wrote in Artforum magazine about Linden's work in "Both Kinds: Contemporary Art in L.A.": "... Precious objects are precious objects and my personal preferences from Diebenkorn 1945, to Linden 1975 means the same thing; the works resemble each other closely, only Linden's a little more loose in technique and tighter in concept. It does not matter how far the distance traveled, chronologically or psychologically. The new looks like the old, and the good things, new or old, are tradition, as in the new tradition, a tradition that looks good. Linden is expressing himself, goddamnit."

Also writing on the "Both Kinds: Contemporary Art in L.A." in Artweek, Judith Dunham observes: "Linden works with acrylic and graphite, combining both to make a sooty, crusty, intentionally rough and ugly surface. He limits color to graphite blacks and grays, warm acrylic neutrals so that the motions of painting are paramount in the final products."

In the Los Angeles Times, Suzanne Muchnic writes: "We read them but can not be sure we grasp all their meaning. (The artist draws on literary sources but does not reveal them.) Instead of putting us off, Linden pulls us in to wonder. If all else fails, the paintings work as abstract compositions. They are built of various combinations of acrylic, wood, and fabric in gray, black and ochre."

"Ron Linden is a significant painter because he resists convenience and, sometimes, even himself. But integrity will out. In the end, Linden makes the difficulty of making the difficult look easy," writes Peter Plagens in the catalog essay for the Cue Foundation.

From Mario Naves' article "Picasso's Ghost," about paintings by Ron Linden exhibited at the CUE Foundation, in the New York Observer, January, 2008: "Riddled by the ghosts of Cubism and Pop's cool ironies, painter Ron Linden's milky investigation of surface, space and denuded biomorphism are only nominally sensual paint-as-stuff chases after painting as intellectual pursuit. Mr. Linden's gift is that brainy impatience doesn’t quell a fractured and elusive poetry - if anything it engenders it."

In 2016, Los Angeles art critic Mat Gleason wrote, "One Southern California art veteran, Ron Linden, is also curating in the South Bay. His TransVagrant / Warschaw Gallery in San Pedro has hosted exhibitions for almost a decade now, specializing in rigorous, almost scholarly shows, primarily of painting. Be they solo or group shows, Linden’s space has a severe eye for the reductive, the historical and the dedicated. Fearlessly championing Modernist forms and playing the long game with art history, TransVagrant and Warschaw exists in a context free from art world tropes that chase what was on the cover of last month's ArtForum. It is one of the crowning achievements of the South Bay, inspiring and informing the whole scene."

== Influences ==
Early in his career Linden was highly influenced by other contemporary artists in his sphere. The abstract expressionism of Willem de Kooning, Philip Guston, the neo-dadaist Jasper Johns, and in particular Richard Diebenkorn, permeates the minimalist style that Linden is known for. Artweek Magazine wrote that Linden's work has been compared to Diebenkorn to the extent that the work of both artists is both intellectual and emotional.

In literature, Minds Meet by the meta-fiction writer Walter Abish has been cited as influencing Linden's experimental style, as well as the work of novelist/playwright Samuel Beckett, and that of the poet Charles Olson.

In the field of music, the experimental composer John Cage was influential with his 'chance related' form of music, challenging assumptions of musicianship and musical experience. Linden also cites Philip Glass, Brian Eno, John Cale, Frank Zappa, and Don Van Vliet as influences.

== Exhibitions ==
In 2008, Lindon had a solo exhibition at the Cue Project, Cue Art Foundation, New York City, New York

In 1982: MoMA PS1, his work was included in the "Critical Perspectives" exhibition .

== Gallery positions ==
- Curator / Director, TransVagrant Projects, Los Angeles (2009–present)
- Curator / Director, Warschaw Gallery, a project partly funded by the California Redevelopment Agency, San Pedro, CA (2005–2016)
- Gallery Director, Los Angeles Harbor College, Wilmington, CA (2000–present)

== Awards and citations ==
- 1978: National Endowment for the Arts, individual artist's grant in painting

== Academic positions ==
- Los Angeles Harbor College, Gallery Director and adjunct faculty (2000–present)
- Long Beach City College, adjunct faculty (2002–present)
- University of California at Irvine, graduate faculty (1989-1993)
- San Francisco Art Institute, visiting artist (1978-1979)
- Vancouver College of Art, visiting artist (1977)
- Art Center College of Design, faculty, Pasadena, CA (1974-1976)
- California State University, Northridge, adjunct faculty (1972-1973)
- Bradley University, Assistant Professor of Art, Peoria, IL (1966 - 1972)
