= Karen Kunc =

- Born: 1952; Omaha, Nebraska
- Known for: Book artist, printmaker
- Website: karen-kunc.com

Karen Kunc (born 1952 in Omaha, Nebraska), is a printmaker and book artist whose artwork utilizes, augments, and distorts symbols of nature. She attended the University of Nebraska-Lincoln and received her BFA in 1975.Her work examines the colors, shapes, and forms of both the natural and artificial landscapes present within our society. Ultimately, she abstracts the visual motifs of both worlds within her art, providing insight into each one and the interaction between them. Her art books, prints, and other artistic ventures have achieved critical acclaim nationally and internationally.

== Early life and education ==
Karen Kunc was born in 1952 in Omaha, Nebraska. She studied and received her Bachelors of Fine Arts (BFA) at the University of Nebraska–Lincoln. After completing her undergraduate education she went on to receive her Masters of Fine Arts (MFA) at Ohio State University.

== Career ==
Karen Kunc’s work has been featured in over 350 exhibitions, nationally and internationally, over the course of her career. She has been the recipient of numerous, prominent awards which include: the 2000 Governor’s Art Award, the 2007 Printmaker Emeritus award from the Southern Graphics Council, the Fulbright scholar awards to Finland and Bangladesh, National Endowment for the Arts awards, the 2016 Lincoln Mayor’s Art Award, a Nebraska Arts Council Individual Artist Fellowship Master Award, an Ohio Arts Council Individual Artist Fellowship, and many more. In addition to her awards and exhibitions, she has achieved a fruitful career within academia as a Professor of the arts. In 1978, she became an Instructor of printmaking at Columbus College of Art and Design. She later returned to the University of Nebraska–Lincoln in 1985, and continues to work there as a Professor of Arts to this day.

== Art ==
Karen Kunc’s work has been critically acclaimed worldwide, her printmaking and bookmaking feature groundbreaking techniques in both mediums. Karen Kunc focuses the conceptual aspects of her artwork on the interactions between humans and the environment. She abstracts the colors, shapes, forms, and idioms of that interaction. The result is a vast array of textures, colors, and compositions that tell a complex narrative of the environment. Her art is also frequently reviewed and covered by publications and media outlets.

Her technique involves many printmaking methods, like woodcut, to achieve the abstracted look typically associated with her artwork. One piece that utilizes this relief method is Coral Sanctuary, which was created in 2017.
