= Dannielle Tegeder =

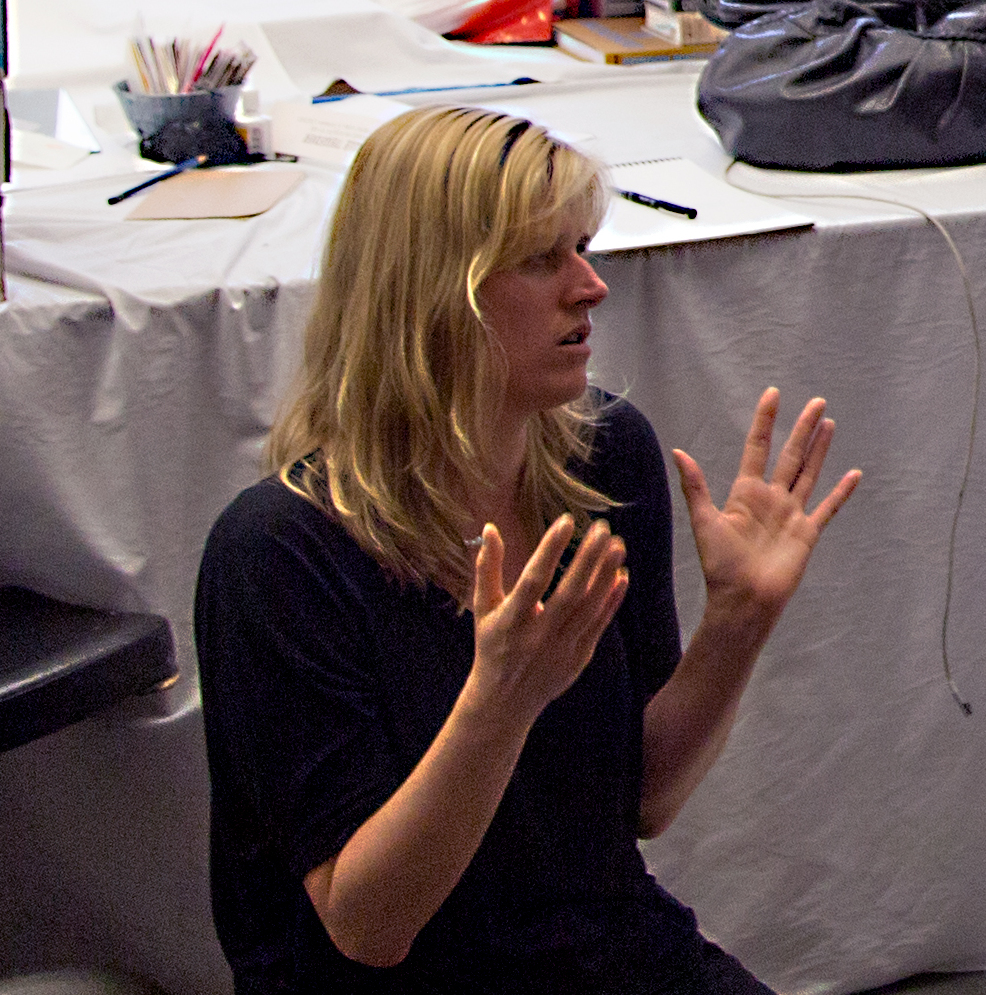
Danielle-Tegeder-100 (18866721908) (cropped)

Dannielle Tegeder is a contemporary artist who works with installation, animation and sound and is best known for her abstract paintings and drawings. She lives in Brooklyn, New York and maintains a studio at Industry City in Sunset Park, Brooklyn.

== Life and work ==
Tegeder was born in Peekskill, New York. She received her BFA from the State University of New York at Purchase, and an MFA in Painting and Drawing from The Art Institute of Chicago. Tegeder’s work employs strategies connected to Post-Minimalism and Twentieth-Century abstraction, often utilizing mathematical, architectural or demographic data to produce an ever-evolving visual vocabulary. Her work is influenced by the mechanical drawings she observed as a child growing up in a family of steam fitters.

Tegeder's work is mainly abstract paintings and drawings and in recent years has expanded to include installation, wall drawings, and sound. She has had solo gallery exhibitions, both nationally and internationally in Paris, Houston, Los Angeles, Berlin, Chicago, and New York. She has participated in numerous group exhibitions at various museums such as PS1/MoMA, The New Museum of Contemporary Art, The Brooklyn Museum of Art, and Museum of Contemporary Art in Chicago.

She has been the recipient of many residencies and grants, including Yaddo, the Pollock-Krasner Foundation, SmackMellon Studio Program, and the Marie Walsh Sharpe Studio Fellowship. In 2011, she was an artist in residence on Governor's Island as part of the Lower Manhattan Cultural Council's Swing Space program. She has been a visiting artist at Cornell University, RISD, Pratt Institute, San Francisco Art Institute, Princeton University, Purchase College and others. She is currently a Professor at Lehman College in the City University of New York.

Her works are in the permanent collection of the Museum of Modern Art, the Museum of Contemporary Art Chicago, and The Weatherspoon Museum of Art in Greensboro, NC.

Tegeder is married to Mexican artist Pablo Helguera and their daughter Estela was born in 2009.

In 2020, Tegeder founded feminist art collective Hilma's Ghost with Sharmistha Ray. As of 2026, Hilma's Ghost has mounted 12 exhibitions internationally and produced publications, public programming, and community-based education combining art, magic, and spiritual abstraction.
