= Martin Saar =

Estonian artist (born 1980)

Martin Saar (born 30 April 1980) is an Estonian artist who currently lives and works between New York City and Tallinn, Estonia.

== Life and work ==
Saar was born in Tallinn. He gained his MA in drawing at the New York Academy of Art in 2014 after studying at Kevade Street Art School and in 2002 graduating from Estonian Academy of Arts.

Saar's work encompasses mosaics, paintings and watercolors as well as digital collages and videos. His work is informed by his love for music, which is translated into radical colors and expressive gestures. Saar's tile series is an example of his evocative use of brushstroke condensed onto a small scale while his large-scale monochromatic paintings reflect on memories of his family life before Estonia's independence in 1991.

Saar gained recognition as an artist for his mosaic paintings of New York celebrities, which were featured in The New York Times.

New York Mosaic.

== General references ==
- Fashionweekdaily, April 10, 2007
- Postimees, Arter, May 6, 2006
- Sirp, May 5, 2006
- * WWD, April 10, 2006
- New York Times, Sunday Style section, March 12, 2006
- Absolute New York Magazine summer 2005 issue
- A&F Magazine summer 2005 issue
- Stiil Magazine, April 2005 issue
- Dan's Papers, December 3, 2004
- The East Hampton Star, December 2, 2004
- Eesti Ekspress, October 28, 2004
