= David Bates (American artist) =

American painter (born 1952)

Butchering the Hog by David Bates, 1984, Honolulu Museum of Art

David Michael Bates (born 1952) is an American artist. He is based in Dallas and is known for his Texas-themed paintings, prints, and sculptures.

== Biography ==
David Michael Bates was born in 1952 in Dallas, Texas. He received a BFA degree in 1975 from Southern Methodist University, and an MFA degree in 1978 from the same institution.

He is best known for his paintings of the Grassy Lakes region of Faulkner County, Arkansas, and the Gulf Coast. He also produces hand-painted sculptures in bronzes, aluminum, and wood. Whether painting on canvas or on his sculptures, Bates's work is characterized by bold, thick, lush brush strokes. Butchering the Hog, in the collection of the Honolulu Museum of Art, demonstrates the artist's use of bold broad brush strokes, in a way that is reminiscent of Naïve art.

Public collections holding works by Bates include the Art Museum of Southeast Texas (Beaumont), Carnegie Museum of Art (Pittsburgh), the Corcoran Gallery of Art (Washington, D.C.), the Dallas Museum of Art, the High Museum of Art (Atlanta, GA), the Hirshhorn Museum and Sculpture Garden (Washington, D.C.), the Honolulu Museum of Art, the Metropolitan Museum of Art, the San Francisco Museum of Modern Art, the Smithsonian American Art Museum (Washington, DC), Speed Art Museum (Louisville), and the Whitney Museum of American Art (New York City).

== Publications ==
- Arthur, John, David Bates, 1992, Charles Cowles Gallery, New York, 1992
- Auping, Michael, David Bates: Southern Coast, John Berggruen Gallery, San Francisco, 2017
- Avery, Iustinus Tim, David Bates, Cel Publishing, 2011 ISBN 9786137130810
- Bates, David, Southern Coast, Berggruen Gallery, San Francisco, 2017 ISBN 9789112119794
- Conrad, Barnaby III, David Bates: The Tropics, John Berggruen Gallery, San Francisco, 2008
- Cozad, Rachel, David Bates. Paintings, Drawings and Sculpture, Talley Dunn Publications, Dallas, TX, 2012
- Little, Carl, David Bates: Paintings and Drawings, DC Moore Gallery, New York, NY, 2004
- Little, Carl, David Bates: The Katrina Paintings, Kemper Museum of Contemporary Art, 2010, ISBN 9781891246203
- Nash, Steven, David Bates, 1995: Sculpture, Charles Cowles Gallery, New York, 1995
- Oliver-Smith, Kerry, The Swamp: On the Edge of Eden, Samuel P. Harn Museum of Art, 2000
- Serwer, Jacquelyn Days, Art Meets Life: The New Work of David Bates, DC Moore Gallery, New York, NY, 2006 ISBN 9780977496525
- Spring, Justin, David Bates, DC Moore Gallery, New York, 1999
- Spring, Justin, David Bates, Scala for Modern Art Museum, Fort Worth, 2008 ISBN 9781857594980
- Van Keuren, Philip, David Bates: Black & White, Dunn and Brown Contemporary, Dallas, TX, 2001
- Van Keuren, Philip, David Bates: Poems, Dunn and Brown Contemporary, Dallas, TX, 2003
- Walker, Anne Macdonald (1984). Paravent; Extending the Range of Expression. David Bates, Deborah Oropallo, Robert Mapplethorpe, Markus Lüpertz, Roy De Forest, Salome, Irene Pijoan, Robert Dix, Elvira Bach, Ed Ruscha. San Francisco, CA: Artspace.
- Wei, Lilly, David Bates, DC Moore Gallery, New York, 2001
