= Ploudalmézeau =

Ploudalmézeau Gwitalmeze
- Commune
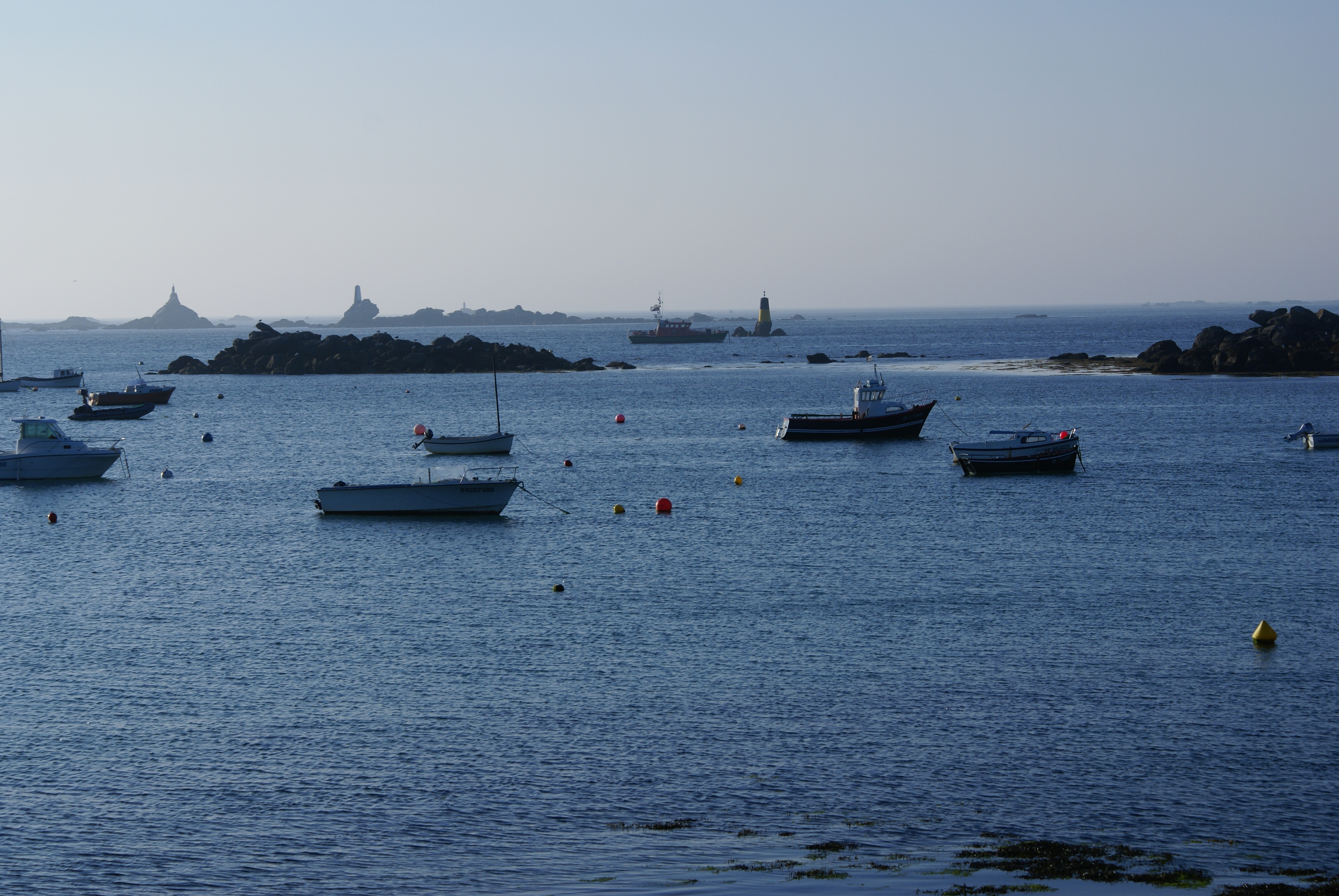
- A view of the sea, at Portsall

- Coat of arms
- Location of Ploudalmézeau
- Location within France Location within Brittany
- Coordinates: 48°32′28″N 4°39′22″W
- Country: France
- Region: Brittany
- Department: Finistère
- Arrondissement: Brest
- Canton: Plabennec
- Intercommunality: Pays d'Iroise

Government
  - Mayor (2026–32): David Carrega
- Area^{1}: 23.18 km^{2} (8.95 sq mi)
- Highest elevation: 86 m (282 ft)
- Lowest elevation: 0 m (0 ft)
- Population (2023): 6,522
  - Density: 281.4/km^{2} (728.7/sq mi)
- Time zone: UTC+01:00 (CET)
  - Summer (DST): UTC+02:00 (CEST)
- INSEE/Postal code: 29178 /29830
- ^{1} French Land Register data, which excludes lakes, ponds, glaciers > 1 km^{2} (0.386 sq mi or 247 acres) and river estuaries.

Ploudalmézeau (French pronunciation: [pludalmezo]; Breton: Gwitalmeze) is a commune in the Finistère department of Brittany in north-western France.

The village and port of Portsall is part of the commune. The Amoco Cadiz oil tanker ran aground off Portsall in 1978, causing a large crude oil spill.

== Geography ==
=== Climate ===
Ploudalmézeau has an oceanic climate (Köppen climate classification Cfb). The average annual temperature in Ploudalmézeau is 11.9 °C (53.4 °F). The average annual rainfall is 1,006.4 mm (39.62 in) with November as the wettest month. The temperatures are highest on average in August, at around 17.0 °C (62.6 °F), and lowest in January, at around 7.7 °C (45.9 °F). The highest temperature ever recorded in Ploudalmézeau was 38.7 °C (101.7 °F) on 18 July 2022; the coldest temperature ever recorded was −7.0 °C (19.4 °F) on 28 February 2018.

Climate data for Ploudalmézeau (1981–2010 averages, extremes 1998−present)
| Month | Jan | Feb | Mar | Apr | May | Jun | Jul | Aug | Sep | Oct | Nov | Dec | Year |
|---|---|---|---|---|---|---|---|---|---|---|---|---|---|
| Record high °C (°F) | 17.0 (62.6) | 20.8 (69.4) | 24.1 (75.4) | 26.8 (80.2) | 28.2 (82.8) | 30.5 (86.9) | 38.7 (101.7) | 32.2 (90.0) | 31.6 (88.9) | 28.1 (82.6) | 21.4 (70.5) | 17.1 (62.8) | 38.7 (101.7) |
| Mean daily maximum °C (°F) | 9.9 (49.8) | 10.3 (50.5) | 11.8 (53.2) | 13.3 (55.9) | 15.9 (60.6) | 18.6 (65.5) | 20.1 (68.2) | 20.5 (68.9) | 19.2 (66.6) | 16.2 (61.2) | 12.6 (54.7) | 10.2 (50.4) | 14.9 (58.8) |
| Daily mean °C (°F) | 7.7 (45.9) | 7.8 (46.0) | 8.9 (48.0) | 10.1 (50.2) | 12.8 (55.0) | 15.1 (59.2) | 16.7 (62.1) | 17.0 (62.6) | 15.6 (60.1) | 13.3 (55.9) | 10.3 (50.5) | 7.8 (46.0) | 11.9 (53.4) |
| Mean daily minimum °C (°F) | 5.5 (41.9) | 5.2 (41.4) | 6.0 (42.8) | 7.0 (44.6) | 9.6 (49.3) | 11.7 (53.1) | 13.3 (55.9) | 13.5 (56.3) | 12.0 (53.6) | 10.3 (50.5) | 8.0 (46.4) | 5.4 (41.7) | 9.0 (48.2) |
| Record low °C (°F) | −5.0 (23.0) | −7.0 (19.4) | −2.2 (28.0) | −0.7 (30.7) | 1.6 (34.9) | 4.3 (39.7) | 6.5 (43.7) | 3.7 (38.7) | 3.5 (38.3) | −0.3 (31.5) | −2.4 (27.7) | −4.4 (24.1) | −7.0 (19.4) |
| Average precipitation mm (inches) | 112.1 (4.41) | 82.1 (3.23) | 74.4 (2.93) | 86.7 (3.41) | 65.5 (2.58) | 48.4 (1.91) | 72.4 (2.85) | 59.6 (2.35) | 61.3 (2.41) | 105.7 (4.16) | 121.0 (4.76) | 117.2 (4.61) | 1,006.4 (39.62) |
| Average precipitation days (≥ 1.0 mm) | 15.8 | 13.1 | 12.9 | 13.3 | 10.5 | 8.5 | 11.4 | 9.1 | 9.2 | 15.5 | 17.0 | 17.5 | 153.6 |
Source: Meteociel

== International relations ==
Ploudalmézeau is twinned with Cullompton, Devon.

== Population ==
Historical population

| Year | Pop. | ±% p.a. |
|---|---|---|
| 1793 | 2,701 | — |
| 1800 | 2,906 | +1.05% |
| 1806 | 2,738 | −0.99% |
| 1821 | 2,881 | +0.34% |
| 1831 | 3,023 | +0.48% |
| 1836 | 3,085 | +0.41% |
| 1841 | 3,209 | +0.79% |
| 1846 | 3,234 | +0.16% |
| 1851 | 3,219 | −0.09% |
| 1856 | 3,220 | +0.01% |
| 1861 | 3,267 | +0.29% |
| 1866 | 3,252 | −0.09% |
| 1872 | 3,148 | −0.54% |
| 1876 | 3,341 | +1.50% |
| 1881 | 3,240 | −0.61% |
| 1886 | 3,205 | −0.22% |
| 1891 | 3,286 | +0.50% |
| 1896 | 3,305 | +0.12% |
| 1901 | 3,436 | +0.78% |

| Year | Pop. | ±% p.a. |
|---|---|---|
| 1906 | 3,465 | +0.17% |
| 1911 | 3,725 | +1.46% |
| 1921 | 3,977 | +0.66% |
| 1926 | 3,946 | −0.16% |
| 1931 | 3,867 | −0.40% |
| 1936 | 3,802 | −0.34% |
| 1946 | 4,142 | +0.86% |
| 1954 | 4,177 | +0.11% |
| 1962 | 4,190 | +0.04% |
| 1968 | 4,297 | +0.42% |
| 1975 | 4,464 | +0.55% |
| 1982 | 4,771 | +0.95% |
| 1990 | 4,874 | +0.27% |
| 1999 | 4,994 | +0.27% |
| 2007 | 5,950 | +2.21% |
| 2012 | 6,275 | +1.07% |
| 2017 | 6,297 | +0.07% |
| 2023 | 6,522 | +0.59% |

Source: EHESS and INSEE (1968-2023)

== Breton language ==
In 2008, 11.69% of primary-school children attended bilingual schools, where Breton language is taught alongside French.

== Amoco Cadiz oil spill ==
Amoco Cadiz anchor in Portsall

On 16 March 1978, Amoco Cadiz, a very large crude carrier (VLCC), owned by Amoco, split in three after running aground on Portsall Rocks, 5 km (3.1 mi) from the coast of Portsall, resulting in the largest oil spill of its kind in history to that date.

== See also ==
- Communes of the Finistère department
