= Gerald Hayes (artist) =

American painter

Gerry Hayes
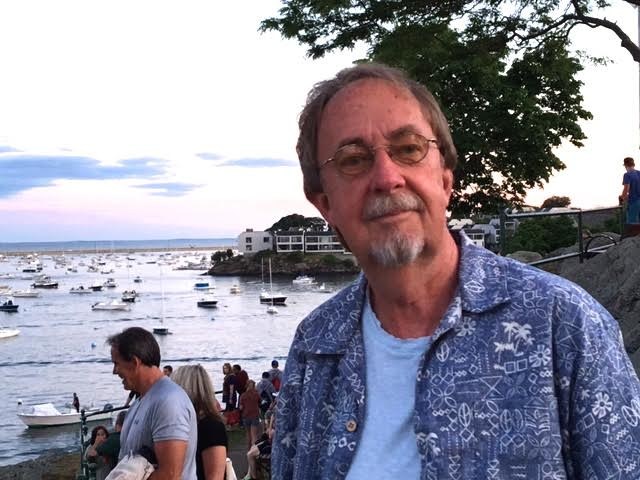
- Gerry Hayes
- Born: Gerald Eugene Hayes; April 9, 1940; Los Angeles, California
- Website: www.ghayesweb.com

Gerry Hayes (born April 9, 1940) is an American painter who in addition to his paintings, has created installation sculpture and conceptual ideas documented in photography.

== Early life and education ==
Hayes was born in Los Angeles and raised in various parts of the South. He obtained a Bachelor of Visual Arts degree at Auburn University in graphic design with an emphasis on painting. For the next two years, he was employed as the Art and Staging Supervisor for Auburn University Educational Television. After moving to Champaign/Urbana, Illinois, Hayes earned a Master of Fine Arts degree in Painting and Printmaking at the University of Illinois in 1966 where he taught painting and drawing before moving to New York City in August 1968.

== Career ==
Hayes' academic career was at Pratt Institute in Brooklyn, New York (1971-2006). At Pratt Institute, Professor Hayes was full-time graduate faculty, teaching seminars in painting, drawing and printmaking. From 1983 to 1985, he served as the Chair of the Undergraduate Painting and Drawing Department and in 1985, taught graduate painting while working as Assistant Chair of the Fine Arts Department until he resigned in 2006. In 2008, he was awarded Professor Emeritus status for his service to the Institute.

== Artworks and exhibitions ==
Hayes' first solo art exhibition in New York was in 1970 at Reese Palley Gallery in Soho. He exhibited his sculpture installations in 1971 at Bradford College and his work was included in the "Lucht Kunst" ( Air Art ) exhibit at the Stedelijk Museum Amsterdam.

In 1972 his work was exhibited at the Everson Museum of Art in Syracuse, New York. Sculpture and photo documentation pieces were included in an exhibit at the Museum of Fine Arts, Boston, titled, "Earth, Air, Fire and Water : Elements of Art." Virginia Gunter, curator of "Elements" exhibit, wrote a feature article on Hayes' work for Artforum, (May 1973), titled "Gerald Hayes: The Creativity of the Psychological Eye"." Gerald's photo-documentation and para-sculpture ideas were made public at the City University of New York. A full page of photos of some of these works were featured in FLASH ART magazine in October 1973.

Hayes began a new series of art work from 1973 to 1976, in the form of drawing with an ink compass on large photographs, relating the arcs of curved shapes to the patterns of plant leaves. A selection of these photo drawings were shown at the 112 Green Street Gallery in Soho and related works of drawn circles and leaf collages were also exhibited in the Bevier Gallery of Rochester Institute of Technology.

=== Hybrid works ===
In 1978, Hayes' work combined photography with painting into a complex circular form. An article written by the painter Craig Fisher for Arts Magazine (June 1980) discussed these works. Robert Pincus-Witten also discussed current and early works in his diary-style writing, "Entries: Styles of Artists and Critics" in Arts Magazine, (November 1979). University of California Santa Barbara Art Museum curator Phyllis Plous included Hayes' leaf arc drawing, a new tondo painting and a wall installation in an exhibit titled "DARK/LIGHT" in 1980. The exhibit traveled to Scripps College in 1982 and was reviewed in Artweek and The Los Angeles Times which included a photo of his installation.

=== Solo Shows ===
A large scale tondo painting was exhibited at the Emily Lowe Gallery of Hofstra University "Abstract Painting, New York City: 1981".

In March 1982 a show of Hayes' tondo and square paintings were exhibited in Tribeca at the Harm Bouckaert Gallery, New York. A comprehensive monograph in ARTS Magazine (March 1982) by Robert Yoskowitz featured the paintings in the exhibit.

Exhibitions of his paintings in 1990 were at the Stockton State College Gallery, Pomona, New Jersey and at the Calkins Gallery of Hofstra University, Hempstead, New York. In 1997 an exhibit titled, "Drawing After the Arcade", was at Southern Cross University Art Museum in Lismore, Australia. A catalog with an essay by Mario Naves documented the works in the exhibit.

=== MoMA and Galleries ===
Mitchell Algus curated an exhibit for his Soho gallery in May 2000 of art from the early 1970s which included Gerald Hayes, Judith Murray, Deborah Remington and Ted Stamm.

Paintings by Gerry Hayes and Scott Malbaurn were shown at Denise Bibro's Platform Gallery in Chelsea (2008). Hayes' paintings were reviewed by Mario Naves for The New York Observer.

On May 14, 2009, Gerry Hayes was one of five artists whose work in the "Compass in Hand: The Judith Rothschild Collection" exhibition discussed their work at a public forum at the Museum of Modern Art, New York. Hayes' work in the exhibition was added to the Museum of Modern Art permanent collection. A biographical article on the work of Gerald Hayes (March 2011) was prepared by art historian, Helmut Kronthaler for a German art encyclopedia, "Allgemeines Kunsterlexikon".

French art critic, Timothée Chaillou, included Hayes' work in a group show in Paris in 2011, titled "No Color in Your Cheeks Unless the Wind Lashes Your Face". In 2016 Mitchell Algus curated the exhibition, Concept, Performance, Documentation, Language of works from the 1970s which included two of Hayes' early photo works.
