= Virginio Ferrari (artist) =

Italian sculptor

Virginio Ferrari is an Italian sculptor, born in Verona and based in Chicago from the middle of the 1960s. He has had more than 50 solo exhibitions and participated in more than 150 group shows. Ferrari Studios, a site for both Virginio and his son Marco, is at 412 S. Wells, 3rd Floor, Chicago, Illinois 60607.

== Artistic Development ==
Ferrari was educated at the Istituto d'Arte N. Nanni and the Accademia di Belle Arti di Verona. His father and grandfather were both stonecutters. From 1966 until 1976, he was the artist in residence and professor of art at the University of Chicago. Chicago contains more than thirty of his public sculptures.

In his early works, Ferrari worked in an abstract and surrealist style but later began to produce monumental sculptures in bronze, steel, iron, marble and granite. His sculptures have been installed in many large US cities and often involve a dialogue between the interiority of the work and the exterior space.

Ferrari, in his own words, describes his idea about the role of the modern, urban artist: "In an urban environment with its social problems, the individual can decide either to become involved or to remain indifferent, but he must make that choice again each day since the problem remains."

== Exhibits ==
- 1967, Renaissance Society at the University of Chicago
- 2003, Galleria d'Arte Moderna e Contemporanea Palazzo Forti di Verona,

== Awards ==
- 1977, Illinois State Service Award
- 1993, Cavaliere Ufficiale della Repubblica Italiana for his contributions in the international field of art

== Public artworks ==
- Dialogo (1970s) in front of Pick Hall, 5828 South University Avenue, Hyde Park, Chicago
- Being Born (1983) 600 N. Orleans, Chicago, IL
- Super Strength (1996), University of Illinois-Chicago
- Ombre della Sera (2001) Galleria d'Arte Moderna e Contemporanea Palazzo Forti, Verona Italy
- La Famiglia (2001), Pietra di Verona, Public Park, Borgo Nuovo, Verona, Italy
- Elementi Circolari in Movimento (2002), Public City Pool, Borgo Roma, Verona, Italy
