= Amoco Cadiz oil spill =

1978 oil spill near the coast of Brittany, France

Coordinates: 48.6°N 4.7°W

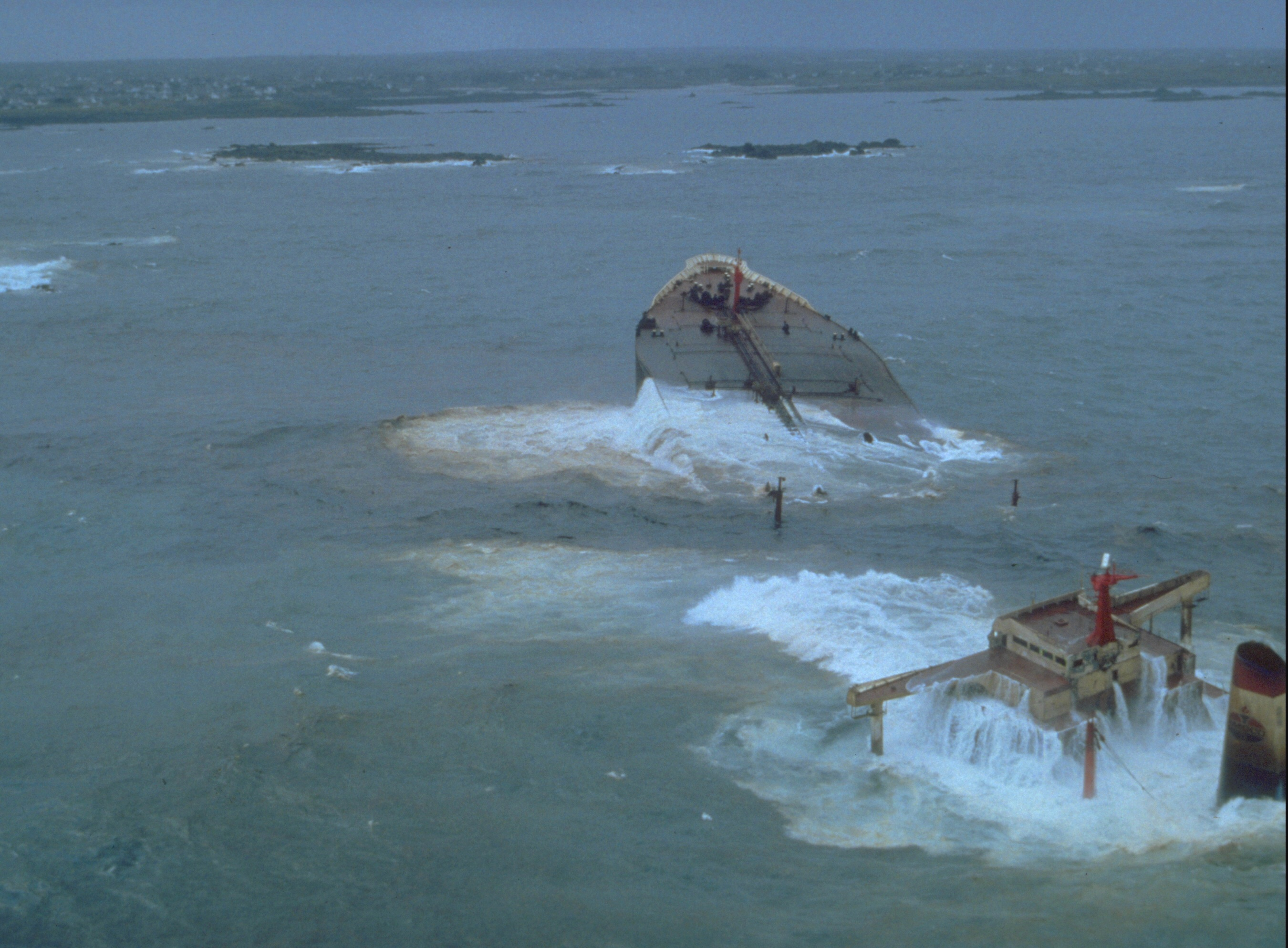
- Amoco Cadiz sinking near the coast of Brittany
- Interactive map of Amoco Cadiz oil spill
- Location: Portsall, Brittany, France
- Date: March 16, 1978; 48 years ago

Cause
- Cause: Sinking of the Amoco Cadiz oil tanker
- Operator: Amoco

Spill characteristics
- Volume: 256,200 m^{3} (or 220,800 metric tons)
- Shoreline impacted: 200 km (120 mi)

The Amoco Cadiz oil spill took place on 16 March 1978, when the oil tanker Amoco Cadiz, owned by the American petroleum company Amoco, ran aground on Portsall Rocks, 2 km (1.2 mi) from the coast of Brittany, France. The vessel ultimately split in three and sank. The US National Oceanic and Atmospheric Administration (NOAA) estimates that the total oil spill amounted to 220,880 tonnes of oil which amounts to over 58 million gallons or 256.2 million litres, making it the largest oil spill of its kind at the time.

== Ship ==
History
- Name: Amoco Cadiz
- Owner: Amoco Transport Co.
- Port of registry: Liberia
- Builder: Astilleros Españoles, S.A.; Cádiz, Spain
- Yard number: 95
- Laid down: 24 November 1973
- Launched: 1974
- Completed: May 1975
- Out of service: 16 March 1978
- Identification: IMO number: 7336422
- Fate: Ran aground off Portsall; wreck destroyed with depth charges, 29 March 1978

General characteristics
- Tonnage: 233,690 DWT; 109,700 GRT
- Length: 334.02 m (1,095.9 ft)
- Beam: 51.06 m (167.5 ft)
- Draught: 19.80 m (65.0 ft)
- Installed power: 22,700 kW; 1 × 30,400 hp (22,700 kW) diesel engine
- Propulsion: Single screw
- Speed: 15 knots (28 km/h; 17 mph)
- Capacity: 1.6 Mbbl (250×10^{3} m^{3})
- Crew: 44

Amoco Cadiz was a single-screw supertanker built by Astilleros Españoles at Cádiz, Spain, as yard number 95. She was laid down on 24 November 1973, launched in 1974 and completed in May 1975. Owned by Amoco Transport Co., a subsidiary of Amoco, she sailed under the Liberian flag. She was 334.02 m (1,095.9 ft) long, with a beam of 51.06 m (167.5 ft) and a deadweight of 233,690 tonnes, and could carry about 1.6 Mbbl (250×10^{3} m^{3}) of oil. A single 30,400 hp (22,700 kW) diesel engine gave her a speed of 15 knots (28 km/h; 17 mph), and she had a crew of 44. On her last voyage she was carrying crude oil for Shell.

== Sequence of events ==
En route from the Persian Gulf to Rotterdam, The Netherlands, via a scheduled stop at Lyme Bay, United Kingdom, the oil tanker Amoco Cadiz, owned by the US-based petroleum company Amoco, encountered stormy weather with gale conditions and high seas while in the English Channel. At around 09:45, a heavy wave slammed into the ship's rudder, resulting in loss of control from the helm. This was later found to be due to the shearing of threaded studs in the ram steering gear, causing a loss of hydraulic fluid. Attempts to repair the damage and regain control of the ship were made but proved unsuccessful. At 10:20, Amoco Cadiz messaged that she was "no longer manoeuvrable" and asked other vessels to stand by, and a call for tugboat assistance was issued later at 11:20.

The German tug Pacific responded to Amoco Cadiz at 11:28, offering assistance under a Lloyd's Open Form. It arrived on the scene at 12:20, but because of the stormy sea, a tow line was not in place until 14:00, and broke off at 16:15. Several attempts were made to establish another tow line and Amoco Cadiz dropped anchor in an attempt to halt its drift. A successful tow line was in place at 20:55, but this measure proved incapable of preventing the tanker from drifting towards the coast because of its huge mass and storm Force 10 winds.

At 21:04 Amoco Cadiz ran aground the first time, flooding its engines. A large wave lifted her onto a spire of rock, which cut through her bottom plating into the pump room and ruptured the rear wall of the number-four cargo tank; after about five minutes another wave lifted her off, and she drifted on to the south-west, pulling the Pacific after her. She ran aground again at 21:39, this time stern first on the Men Goulven rock, about 2 km (1.2 mi) from the shore, ripping open the hull and starting the oil spill. She swung round until her bow pointed toward land and came to rest with her stern on a rock about 12 m (39 ft) below the surface and her bow on another 6–7 m (20–23 ft) deep. Shortly after 22:00 the second tow line parted. Her crew was rescued by French Naval Aviation helicopters at midnight, and her captain and one officer remained aboard until 05:00 the next morning. At 10:00 on 17 March the vessel broke in two, releasing its entire cargo of 1.6 million barrels (250,000 m^{3}) of oil, and broke again eleven days later from the buffeting of high stormy seas. On 24 March the two halves were completely torn apart and the stern section swung round to point south-east; by 29 March the wreck lay in three pieces. The French Navy then decided to destroy it: three Super Frelon helicopters dropped twelve Mark 56 anti-submarine charges, each containing 350 lb (160 kg) of high explosive set to detonate 8 m (26 ft) under water, and the remains sank 15 minutes later. The explosions threw up large columns of water and shook the ground on shore more than a mile away.

== Oil spill ==
Amoco Cadiz contained 1,604,500 barrels (219,797 tons) of light crude oil from Ras Tanura, Saudi Arabia, and Kharg Island, Iran. Additionally, she had nearly 4,000 tonnes of bunker oil. Severe weather resulted in the complete breakup of the ship before any oil could be pumped out of the wreck, resulting in its entire cargo of crude oil (belonging to Shell) and 4,000 tons of fuel oil being spilled into the sea.

A 19 km (12 mi) long slick and heavy pools of oil spread onto 72 km (45 mi) of the French shoreline by northwesterly winds. Prevailing westerly winds during the following month spread the oil approximately 160 km (100 mi) east along the coast. One week after the accident, oil had reached Côtes d'Armor. Oil penetrated the sand on several beaches to a depth of 500 millimetres (20 in). Sub-surface oil separated into two or three layers due to the extensive sand transfer that occurred on the beaches during rough weather. Piers and slips in the small harbors from Porspoder to Brehat Island were covered with oil. Other affected areas included the pink granite rock beaches of Trégastel and Perros-Guirec, as well as the tourist beaches at Plougasnou. The total extent of oiling one month after the spill included approximately 320 kilometres (200 mi) of coastline. Beaches of 76 different Breton communities were affected. Oil persisted for only a few weeks along the exposed rocky shores that experienced moderate to high wave action. In the areas sheltered from wave action, however, the oil persisted in the form of an asphalt crust for several years.

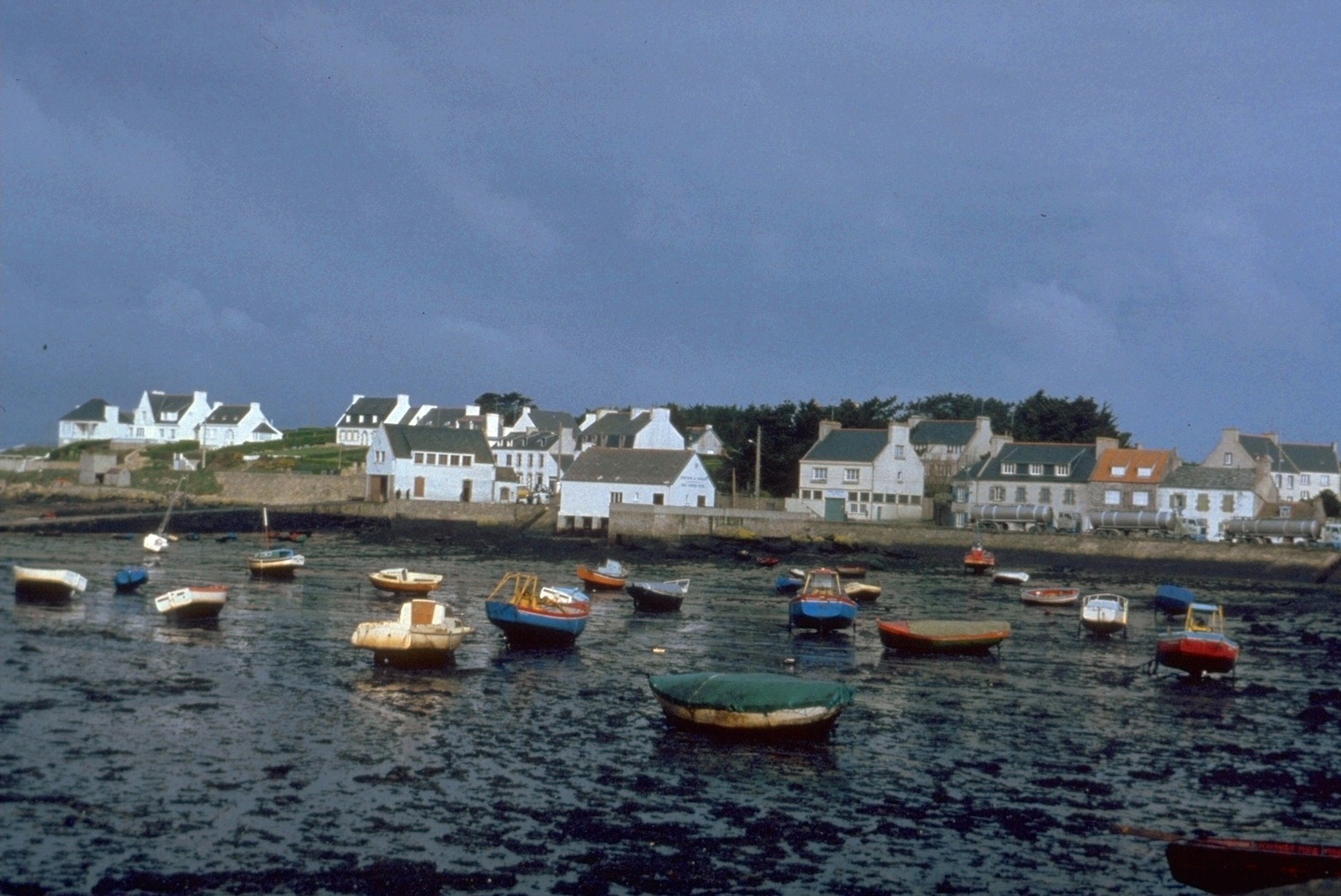
Oiled beach in Brittany.

The isolated location of the grounding and rough seas hampered cleanup efforts for two weeks following the incident. As mandated in the "Polmar Plan", the French Navy was responsible for all offshore operations while the Civil Safety Service was responsible for shore cleanup activities. Although the total quantity of collected oil and water reached 100,000 tons, less than 20,000 tons of oil were recovered from this liquid after treatment in refining plants.

The nature of the oil and rough seas contributed to the rapid formation of a "chocolate mousse" emulsification of oil and water. This viscous emulsification greatly complicated the cleanup efforts. French authorities decided not to use dispersants in sensitive areas or the coastal fringe where water depth was less than 50 metres (160 ft). Had dispersant been applied from the air in the vicinity of the spill source, the formation of mousse might have been prevented.

At the time, the Amoco Cadiz incident resulted in the largest loss of marine life ever recorded from an oil spill. Mortalities of most animals occurred over the two months following the spill. Two weeks following the accident, millions of dead molluscs, sea urchins, and other bottom dwelling organisms washed ashore. Diving birds constituted the majority of the nearly 20,000 dead birds that were recovered. The oyster mortality from the spill was estimated at 9,000 tons. Fishermen in the area caught fish with skin ulcerations and tumors. Some of the fish caught in the area reportedly had a strong taste of petroleum. Although echinoderm and small crustacean populations almost completely disappeared, the populations of many species recovered within a year. Cleanup activities on rocky shores, such as pressure-washing, also caused habitat impacts.

The Amoco Cadiz spill, the largest in history at that point, was one of the most studied; many studies remain in progress in the early 21st century. It was also the first spill in which estuarine tidal rivers were oiled. No follow-up mitigation existed to deal with asphalt formation and problems that resulted after the initial aggressive cleanup.

Additional erosion of beaches occurred in several places where no attempt was made to restore the gravel that was removed to lower the beach face. Many of the affected marshes, mudflats, and sandy beaches, were low-energy areas. Evidence of oiled beach sediments can still be seen in some of these sheltered areas. Layers of sub-surface oil still remain buried in many of the impacted beaches.

== Culture ==
The Amoco Cadiz and its spill features in one of Steve Forbert's songs about oil pollution. Speedy J has a song named "Amoco Cadiz" on his album A Shocking Hobby. French popstar Alain Barriere had a disco hit in France with a song called "Amoco".

Footage of the incident appeared in the film Days of Fury (1979), directed by Fred Warshofsky and hosted by Vincent Price.

== Legal claims ==
In 1978, it was estimated to have caused US$250 million in damage to fisheries and tourist amenities. The French government presented claims totalling 1.9 billion French francs to US courts (using the 1978 exchange rate and with interest added this came to at least US$1.6 billion). In 1984, US District Court Judge Frank J. McGarr held that Amoco was liable for damages when he issued his trial verdict, after 3½ years of legal proceedings. Further, the judge ruled that Amoco had put off needed maintenance on the vessel in order to keep it at sea. In 1992, Amoco decided not to appeal against the court order.

In 1988 a U.S. federal judge ordered Amoco Oil Corporation to pay $85.2 million in fines; $45 million for the costs of the spill and $39 million in interest.

In 1992, in a decision by the United States courts of appeals, the French plaintiffs were entitled to compound prejudgment interest at a rate of 11.9% per annum from January 1, 1980, implying a multiplier of 3.3162 in the decision named In the Matter of OIL SPILL BY THE AMOCO CADIZ OFF THE COAST OF FRANCE ON MARCH 16, 1978 Amoco was eventually forced to pay $230 million (equivalent to $528m in 2025).

== Wreck ==
The wreck lies off Portsall and has become a popular site for recreational divers.

== See also ==
- Torrey Canyon oil spill – nearby and similar disaster in 1967
- MT Haven – formerly Amoco Milford Haven, sister ship of Amoco Cadiz that also sank and caused an oil spill disaster.
- List of oil spills
