= List of University of Denver alumni =

List of some notable people associated with the University of Denver

Coordinates: 39.6767°N 104.9615°W

Location of the University of Denver in Colorado

The following is a list of some notable people associated with the University of Denver.

== Scientists ==
- Harold Agnew, physicist on the Manhattan Project and director of the Los Alamos National Laboratory 1970–1979
- Henry Otley Beyer, father of anthropology and ethnology in the Philippines
- Asa Grant Hilliard III, egyptologist and professor of educational psychology
- Arnold Kramish (1923–2010), nuclear physicist on the Manhattan Project who was almost killed in a radioactive explosion
- Lula Lubchenco, pediatrician who researched the relationships between gestational age and birth weight
- Henry T. Lynch, cancer researcher, considered one of the "fathers of cancer genetics"
- Valentino Mazzia (1922–1999), forensic anesthesiologist
- Frances McConnell-Mills (1900–1975), toxicologist
- Donald Menzel, one of America's first astrophysicists, former director of Harvard College Observatory
- David Pion-Berlin, political scientist, academic, author and scholar
- Myrtle L. Richmond, astronomical researcher at Mount Wilson Observatory, 1913–1947
- Anne Roe, clinical psychologist and researcher
- Claibourne Smith, chemist
- Del Thiessen, psychology theorist
- Cleo Spurlock Wallace, child speech therapist; founder of Wallace Village
- Maud Wilde (1880–1965), founder, Mothers' Educational Center

== Politics, government and military ==
- Frank Aguon, Guam senator
- Carl Anderson, former special assistant to President Reagan; current Supreme Knight/CEO of the Knights of Columbus
- Owen Aspinall, 45th governor of American Samoa
- Wayne Aspinall, former member, U.S. House of Representatives (D-Colo.)
- Ibrahim Abdulaziz Al-Assaf, foreign minister, Saudi Arabia
- W. Meredith Bacon, political scientist; LGBT rights activist
- César Vásquez Bazán, former Minister of Economy and Finance of Peru
- Ann Bedsole, Alabama Republican politician
- Charles Brannan, former U.S. Secretary of Agriculture under President Truman
- Paula Broadwell, bestselling author; extramarital partner of David Petraeus
- Robyn Brody, associate justice of the Idaho Supreme Court
- Terrance Carroll, speaker of the Colorado House of Representatives
- Michael Carter, Colorado House of Representatives, District 36
- George W. Casey, Jr., four-star general and 36th chief of staff of the United States Army, former commander of U.S. forces in Iraq
- Oscar Chapman, former U.S. Secretary of Interior under President Truman
- Mary Cheney, political activist; daughter of former Vice President Dick Cheney
- Cindy Courville, former U.S. ambassador to the African Union
- Jason Crow, member, U.S House of Representatives (D-Colo.)
- Robert E. DeNier, member of the Colorado House of Representatives and the Colorado Senate
- Robert Dieter, U.S. ambassador to Belize
- Pete Domenici, former U.S. senator (R-N.M.)
- Byron Dorgan, former U.S. senator (D-N.D.)
- Mike Enzi, former U.S. senator (R-Wyo.)
- Floyd Esquibel, member of the Wyoming Senate; former member of the Wyoming House of Representatives
- William D. Ford, former member, U.S. House of Representatives (D-Mich.)
- John V. Garza, member, Texas House of Representatives (R-San Antonio)
- Peter Groff, president, Colorado Senate
- John Grubesic, New Mexico state senator, representing the 25th District as a Democrat
- Millie Hamner, member of the Colorado House of Representatives; former school district superintendent for Summit County, Colorado
- Martin Hatcher (1927–2023), Colorado state senator and college professor
- Loy Henderson, former U.S. ambassador to Iran
- Najma Heptulla, current member of Upper House of the Indian Parliament
- G. Kathleen Hill, current U.S. ambassador to Malta
- Ahmad Ismail, mayor of Kuala Lumpur, Malaysia
- Howard Jenkins Jr., former civil servant and labor lawyer
- Katherine Karađorđević, princess of Serbia
- Fred Karger, campaign strategist; 2012 presidential candidate; first openly gay candidate
- Bilal Omer Khan, major general in the Pakistan Army
- Michelle Kwan, former U.S. Olympic figure skating medalist; current U.S. ambassador to Belize
- Paul Laxalt, former Nevada governor and U.S. senator (R-Nev.)
- Clarence F. Lea, former member, U.S. House of Representatives (D-California)
- John Arthur Love, former governor of Colorado; director of U.S. Energy Policy under President Nixon
- Fred Mahaffey, DU football all-American and youngest US Army four-star general
- Ahmed bin Saeed Al Maktoum, president of the Dubai Civil Aviation Authority
- David Malpass, president, the World Bank Group
- Azlan Man, Menteri Besar (chief minister) of the Malaysian state of Perlis
- Mike McKevitt, former member, U.S. House of Representatives (R-Colo.)
- Jami Miscik, former deputy director for Intelligence at the CIA; vice-chairman of Kissinger Associates, Inc. in New York
- Massouma al-Mubarak, Kuwait's first female cabinet minister
- Heraldo Muñoz, current Chilean foreign minister, former Chilean ambassador to the United Nations
- Shahzada Jamal Nazir, former federal minister for ministries of National Health Services, Religious Affairs, National Heritage & Integration and National Harmony, Government of Pakistan; former adviser/minister of state for the Government of Pakistan
- Reynold Nesiba, South Dakota state senator
- James Nicholson, former secretary of Veterans Affairs under President G.W. Bush
- Gale Norton, former U.S. Secretary of the Interior under President G.W. Bush
- Condoleezza Rice, former National Security Advisor and U.S. Secretary of State under President G.W. Bush
- Byron Rogers, former member, U.S. House of Representatives (D-Colo.)
- Andrew Romanoff, former Colorado (D) House speaker; 2010 U.S. Senate candidate (Colo.)
- Ed Schafer, former U.S. Secretary of Agriculture under President G.W. Bush; former governor of North Dakota
- Richard Stark, current Florida State House member (D-FL)
- Paul Trivelli, former U.S. ambassador to Nicaragua
- Mo Udall, former member, U.S. House of Representatives (D-Ariz)
- Susan Waltz, chair of International Executive Committee, Amnesty International; professor of public policy at Gerald R. Ford School of Public Policy, University of Michigan
- Alvin Wiederspahn, law school graduate; former member of both houses of the Wyoming legislature; prominent Cheyenne attorney and historical preservationist
- Jerre Stockton Williams, expert in labor law; first chairman of the Administrative Conference of the United States; professor of law at University of Iowa College of Law (1941–1942), University of Denver (1946), and The University of Texas School of Law (1946–1980); president, Association of American Law Schools (1980); judge, United States Court of Appeals for the Fifth Circuit (1980–1993)
- John Patrick Williams, former member, U.S. House of Representatives (D-Mont.)
- Mohammad Javad Zarif, Minister of Foreign Affairs, Islamic Republic of Iran

== Business and industry ==
- Brad Anderson, former CEO of Best Buy
- Dean Baker (born 1958), macroeconomist
- Roger Birnbaum, CEO and co-founder of Spyglass Entertainment; former chairman and CEO of MGM Studios
- Peter Coors, chairman of Molson Coors Brewing Company
- Debra Crew, CEO and president of Diageo
- Heidi Ganahl, founder of Camp Bow Wow chain
- Ruth Handler, former president of Mattel, Inc. and inventor of the Barbie doll
- Richard Hilton, chairman of Hilton and Hyland Real Estate
- Elrey Jeppesen, aviation pioneer; founder of Jeppesen and Co., an aviation charting company today owned by Boeing
- Jay Kemmerer, chairman of Jackson Hole Mountain Resort
- James C. Kennedy, former CEO and current Chairman of Cox Enterprises
- Imran Khan, former chief strategy officer of Snapchat
- Ted J. Kleisner, president and CEO of Hershey Entertainment & Resorts Company
- Lewis Kornfeld, former CEO of Radio Shack
- Jim Lentz, president and CEO of Toyota North America
- Jeffrey Lorberbaum, chairman and CEO of Mohawk Industries
- Emmit McHenry, technology entrepreneur; founder of Network Solutions
- Peter Morton, founder of Hard Rock Cafe chain
- Marc Nathanson, billionaire founder of Falcon Cable, Biden nominee as ambassador to Norway
- Duane D. Pearsall, inventor of the battery-powered home smoke detector
- Scott Mitchell Rosenberg, CEO/Chairman of Platinum Studios; founder of Malibu Comics; screenwriter of Con Air and Men in Black
- Joseph Saunders, chairman and CEO of Visa Inc.
- Andrew C. Taylor, CEO of Enterprise Rent-A-Car
- Carol Tomé, CEO of United Parcel Service
- Dale Wolf, CEO, Coventry Health Care

== Media ==
- Alan Berg, former attorney; murdered radio talk show host
- Bob Berkowitz, former CNN White House correspondent, ABC News and NBC's Today Show
- Clarke Canfield, Associated Press reporter and author
- James W. "Jim" Case, program director, KRMA-TV
- James L. Conway, producer and director, Charmed, Smallville, 90210, Star Trek
- Ronnie Cramer, film director
- Jargalsaikhan Dambadarjaa, Mongolian economist, television host, writer, and political commentator
- Edward W. Estlow, former CEO of E.W. Scripps Company
- Peter Funt, president and host of Candid Camera
- Merle Harmon, sports broadcaster, ABC and NBC TV, many MLB and NFL teams
- Aaron Huey, photojournalist and contributing editor, Harper's Weekly
- James C. Kennedy, chairman, former CEO, Cox Enterprises
- Louise Martin, journalistic photographer, Houston Forward Times and Houston Informer
- Bill Mercer, sports play-by-play announcer, Dallas Cowboys, Texas Rangers, and World Class Championship Wrestling; retired faculty member from University of North Texas
- Mike Rosen, conservative talk radio host
- Andrew Rosenthal, editorial page editor, The New York Times
- Bill Scott, writer and voice artist, The Adventures of Rocky and Bullwinkle and Friends
- Ed Stein, editorial cartoonist, Rocky Mountain News
- Jon Taffer, host and creator, Bar Rescue television show, SpikeTV
- Lowell Thomas, radio commentator, author, filmmaker and first national TV news anchor on NBC (1939)
- David Von Drehle, columnist, Washington Post; former editor-at-large for Time magazine and author

== Sports ==
- Bruce Affleck, former NHL player; now chief operating officer of St. Louis Blues
- Glenn Anderson, Hockey Hall of Fame wing and who scored 498 career NHL goals and won six Stanley Cups, 1980 Canadian Olympian
- Erik Andersson, former NHL forward with Calgary Flames
- Bob Balog, former NFL center/linebacker with Pittsburgh Steelers
- Trevor Baptiste, PLL All-Star lacrosse player with Atlas Lacrosse Club, Philadelphia Wings
- Sam Bassett, MLS midfielder with Colorado Rapids
- Byron Beck, ABA and NBA Denver Nuggets basketball star in 1960s and 70s, number 40 retired by team
- Eddy Beers, former NHL forward with Calgary Flames and St. Louis Blues
- Beau Bennett, former NHL forward with Arizona Coyotes, St. Louis Blues, New Jersey Devils, Pittsburgh Penguins
- Mike Benning, NHL defenseman with Florida Panthers
- Wesley Berg, PLL lacrosse player with Redwoods Lacrosse Club, San Diego Seals
- Adam Berkhoel, former NHL goaltender with Atlanta Thrashers
- Doug Berry, former NHL forward with Colorado Avalanche
- Ken Berry, former NHL forward with Edmonton Oilers and Vancouver Canucks, two-time Canadian Olympian (1980, 1988)
- Jerome Biffle, 1952 US Olympic gold medalist in the long jump
- Steve Blateric, former MLB pitcher, New York Yankees, Cincinnati Reds, and California Angels
- Ray Boggs, former MLB pitcher with Boston Braves
- Nat Borchers, former MLS soccer defender with Portland Timbers, Real Salt Lake, Colorado Rapids and US National Team
- Henrik Borgström, NHL center with Chicago Blackhawks and Florida Panthers
- Vince Boryla, 1948 US Olympic gold medalist, NBA player with New York Knicks, NBA head coach and long-time NBA executive
- Henry Bostick, former MLB third baseman with Philadelphia Athletics
- Tyler Bozak, NHL forward with St. Louis Blues and Toronto Maple Leafs
- Lyle Bradley, former NHL player with California Golden Seals and Cleveland Barons
- Rick Bragnalo, former NHL player with Washington Capitals
- Bobby Brink, NHL forward with Philadelphia Flyers
- Gregg Browning, NFL tight end with New York Giants
- Tristan Broz, NHL forward with Pittsburgh Penguins
- Zeev Buium, NHL defenseman with Vancouver Canucks and Minnesota Wild
- Mike Busniuk, former NHL player with Philadelphia Flyers
- Will Butcher, NHL defenseman with Buffalo Sabres and New Jersey Devils and 2017 Hobey Baker Award Winner
- Chris Butler, former NHL defenseman with the St. Louis Blues, Calgary Flames and Buffalo Sabres
- Ryan Caldwell, former NHL defenseman with New York Islanders and Phoenix Coyotes
- Matt Carle, former NHL defenseman with Tampa Bay Lightning, Philadelphia Flyers and San Jose Sharks 2007 NHL all-Rookie team and 2006 Hobey Baker Award winner
- Don Carlsen, former MLB pitcher with Chicago Cubs and Pittsburgh Pirates
- Suzy Chaffee, former Olympic, World Cup and professional freestyle skier, TV pitchwoman known as "Suzy Chapstick"
- Mike Christie, former NHL player with Colorado Avalanche, Cleveland Barons, Vancouver Canucks and California Golden Seals
- Magnus Chrona, NHL goaltender with San Jose Sharks
- Joe Colborne, former NHL forward with Colorado Avalanche, Calgary Flames, Toronto Maple Leafs and Boston Bruins
- Devin Cooley, NHL goaltender with Calgary Flames
- Paul Comrie, former NHL forward with Edmonton Oilers
- Ed Cristofoli, former NHL forward with Montreal Canadiens
- Courtney Dauwalter, America's top-ranked ultra-distance runner
- Jack Devine, NHL forward with Florida Panthers
- Kevin Dineen, former NHL all-star player; former head coach, Florida Panthers, 1984 Canadian Olympian and gold medal coach of Canadian women's team at 2014 Sochi Olympics
- Kevin Doell, former NHL forward with Atlanta Thrashers
- Matt Donovan, NHL defenseman with Nashville Predators
- Ferd Dreher, former NFL football player with Chicago Bears
- Wade Dubielewicz, former NHL goaltender with New York Islanders, Columbus Blue Jackets and Minnesota Wild
- Reagan Dunk, former MLS soccer defender, Real Salt Lake
- Eddie Eagan, US gold medalist at 1920 Antwerp Olympics (boxing) and 1932 Lake Placid Olympics (bobsled), the only person to be a gold medalist at both Summer and Winter Olympic Games; attended DU in 1916 before his transfer to Yale University
- Burak Elmas, president, Galatasaray Soccer Club, Istanbul, Turkey
- Sam Etcheverry, NFL QB with St. Louis Cardinals, also Canadian Football League Hall of Fame player and coach
- Kortne Ford, MLS soccer defender with Colorado Rapids
- Dylan Gambrell, NHL forward with Ottawa Senators and San Jose Sharks
- Dallas Gaume, former NHL forward with Hartford Whalers and all-time leading scorer for DU hockey (266 points)
- Gabe Gauthier, former NHL hockey player with Los Angeles Kings
- Ron Grahame, former NHL goaltender with Boston Bruins, Los Angeles Kings and Quebec Nordiques
- Mark Grimmette, with Brian Martin, two-time U.S. Olympic medalist luge pair in 1998 and 2002 Olympics
- Cole Guttman, NHL forward with Chicago Blackhawks
- Kristen Hamilton, NWSL professional soccer player, North Carolina Courage and US National Team
- Gil Hanse, golf course architect (Rio 2016 Olympic Course, Doral Golf Club)
- Ronnie Harrell (born 1996), basketball player for Hapoel Gilboa Galil of the Israeli Basketball Premier League
- Phil Heath, professional bodybuilder, seven-time Mr. Olympia winner
- Danton Heinen, NHL hockey forward with Pittsburgh Penguins, Anaheim Ducks and Boston Bruins
- Keri Herman, freestyle skier with five X Games silver medals, three World Cup titles, and a Grand Prix gold and represented Team USA at the 2014 Winter Olympics
- Blake Hillman, former NHL hockey defenseman with Chicago Blackhawks
- Monty Hoyt, 1964 US Olympic figure skater
- Lex Hudson, former NHL hockey player with Pittsburgh Penguins
- Tommy Hugo, former Canadian Football Hall of Fame football player with Montreal Allouettes
- Connor James, former NHL forward with Pittsburgh Penguins and Los Angeles Kings
- Ray Johnson, NFL football player with Cleveland Rams
- Marshall Johnston, NHL and Canadian Olympic hockey forward (1964 and 1968), NHL coach and executive
- Preston Judd, MLS forward with San Jose Earthquakes and LA Galaxy
- Chris Kenady, former NHL forward with St. Louis Blues and New York Rangers
- Yoram Kochavy, 1984 Olympic swimmer with Israel
- Espen Kofstad, 2022 PGA Tour golfer and 2016 Olympic golfer with Norway
- George Konik, former NHL player with Pittsburgh Penguins
- Cliff Koroll, former NHL winger with Chicago Blackhawks and later Blackhawks head coach
- Michelle Kwan, multiple World Champion figure skater, two-time Olympic medalist in 1998/2002, graduated June 2009
- Antti Laaksonen, former NHL forward with Boston Bruins, Minnesota Wild and Colorado Avalanche, 2006 Olympic silver medal with Finland
- Mike Lampman, former NHL player with St. Louis Blues, Vancouver Canucks and Washington Capitals
- Richard Lapchick, sports human rights activist
- Jim Leavins, former NHL defenseman with Detroit Red Wings and New York Rangers
- Floyd Little, Hall of Fame running back, Denver Broncos (MS Judicial Admin '75)
- Jessica López, Venezuelan three-time Olympic gymnast in 2008, 2012 and 2016
- Pete LoPresti, former NHL goaltender with Minnesota North Stars and Edmonton Oilers
- Aaron MacKenzie, former NHL defenseman with Colorado Avalanche
- John MacMillan, former NHL forward and two-time Stanley Cup winner with Toronto Maple Leafs and Detroit Red Wings
- Keith Magnuson, former NHL defenseman, Chicago Blackhawks and later Blackhawks head coach
- Peter Mannino, former NHL goaltender with New York Islanders, Atlanta Thrashers and Winnipeg Jets
- Brian Martin, with Mark Grimmette, two-time U.S. Olympic medalist luge pair, 1998 and 2002
- Tom Martin, former NHL forward with Minnesota North Stars, Hartford Whalers and Winnipeg Jets
- Bill Masterton, former NHL forward with Minnesota North Stars; namesake of the NHL's Bill Masterton Trophy
- Dwight Mathiasen, former NHL forward with Pittsburgh Penguins
- Derek Mayer, former NHL defenseman with Ottawa Senators, 1994 Canadian Olympian
- Scott Mayfield, NHL defenseman with New York Islanders
- Carter Mazur, NHL forward with Detroit Red Wings
- Peter McNab, former NHL player with Buffalo Sabres, Boston Bruins and New Jersey Devils; former color analyst for the Colorado Avalanche
- Dakota Mermis, NHL defenseman with Minnesota Wild, New Jersey Devils and Arizona Coyotes
- Paul Messier, former NHL forward with Colorado Avalanche
- Tom Miller, former NHL player with Detroit Red Wings and New York Islanders
- Ian Mitchell, NHL defenseman with Detroit Red Wings, Boston Bruins and Chicago Blackhawks
- Trevor Moore, NHL forward with Los Angeles Kings and Toronto Maple Leafs
- Gavin Morgan, former NHL forward with Dallas Stars
- George Morrison, former NHL forward with St. Louis Blues
- Ade Murkey, NBA forward with Sacramento Kings
- Logan O'Connor, NHL forward with Colorado Avalanche
- Royce O'Neale, NBA forward with Phoenix Suns, Brooklyn Nets, Utah Jazz
- Rob Palmer, former NHL forward with Chicago Blackhawks
- Craig Patrick, former NHL player; Stanley-Cup winning NHL executive and assistant coach for 1980 US Olympic gold medal hockey team
- Matt Pettinger, former NHL forward with Washington Capitals, Vancouver Canucks and Tampa Bay Lightning
- Ernie Pitts, Canadian Football Hall of Famer with Winnipeg Blue Bombers and British Columbia Lions
- Gregg Popovich, head coach, NBA champion with San Antonio Spurs and 2020 U.S. Olympic Team
- Lynn Powis, former NHL forward with Chicago Blackhawks and Kansas City Scouts
- Rich Preston, former NHL forward with Chicago Blackhawks and New Jersey Devils
- Rhett Rakhshani, former NHL forward with New York Islanders
- Craig Redmond, former NHL defenseman with Los Angeles Kings and Edmonton Oilers, 1984 Canadian Olympian
- Reggie Rivers, motivational speaker; former Denver Broncos running back
- Mark Rycroft, former NHL forward with St. Louis Blues and Colorado Avalanche
- Willy Schaeffler, former University of Denver ski coach 1948–1972; former U.S. Ski Team Alpine director + coach 1968–1972
- Dan Schatzeder, winning pitcher of Game 6 of the 1987 World Series, Minnesota Twins (and other MLB teams)
- Jim Shea, Olympic cross-country skier
- Andre Shinyashiki, MLS forward with Charlotte FC, Colorado Rapids, 2019 MLS Rookie of the Year
- Jim Shires, former NHL player with Detroit Red Wings, St. Louis Blues and Pittsburgh Penguins
- Drew Shore, former NHL forward with Florida Panthers, Calgary Flames, Vancouver Canucks and Carolina Hurricanes
- Nick Shore, former NHL forward with Winnipeg Jets, Toronto Maple Leafs, Ottawa Senators, Los Angeles Kings and Calgary Flames
- Brett Skinner, former NHL defenseman with New York Islanders
- Graham Smith, MLS soccer defender with Sporting Kansas City
- Wayne Smith, former NHL player with Chicago Blackhawks
- Don Stansauk, NFL defensive end with Green Bay Packers, later became pro wrestling legend and actor Hard Boiled Haggerty
- Craig Stimac, former MLB catcher with San Diego Padres
- Paul Stastny, NHL forward, Winnipeg Jets and Las Vegas Golden Knights, Colorado Avalanche and 2010 US Olympic silver medalist
- Troy Terry, NHL forward with Anaheim Ducks, 2018 U.S. Olympic Team
- Sarah Thomas, ultra-distance swimmer, first person, male or female, to ever swim English Channel four times non-stop
- Jack Tising, former MLB pitcher with the Pittsburgh Pirates
- Brock Trotter, former NHL forward with Montreal Canadiens
- Vic Venasky, former NHL forward with Los Angeles Kings
- Michelle Waterson, professional mixed martial artist for the UFC's Strawweight division
- Patrick Wiercioch, former NHL defenseman with Ottawa Senators and Colorado Avalanche
- Joe Willis, MLS goalkeeper with Nashville SC, Houston Dynamo, and Washington D.C. United
- Jim Wiste, former NHL forward with Chicago Blackhawks and Vancouver Canucks
- John Woudenberg, former NFL player with Pittsburgh Steelers and San Francisco 49ers, 1942 Pro Bowl
- Jared Wright, NHL forward with Los Angeles Kings
- Jason Zucker, NHL forward with Buffalo Sabres, Pittsburgh Penguins and Minnesota Wild

== Literature, music, and the arts ==
- Bernadine Abbott-Hoduski, librarian and author
- Linda Alterwitz, artist and photographer
- C.J. Box, novelist
- Chris Broderick, heavy metal guitarist (Megadeth, Jag Panzer, Nevermore)
- Charlie Burrell, bassist
- Mary Coyle Chase, playwright, wrote Broadway hit Harvey
- Sandra Dallas, writer and novelist
- Joan Dickinson, artist, writer, and teacher
- Ed Dwight, first African-American astronaut trainee, sculptor
- Victoria Fuller, artist and sculptor
- Peter Gay, historian and educator
- Aaron Gwyn, author and professor
- Mark Harris, author, Bang the Drum Slowly
- Elizabeth Orpha Sampson Hoyt (1828–1912), philosopher, author, lecturer
- Wilson Bryan Key, author
- Elliot Martin, Broadway producer and director
- Carey McWilliams, journalist, historian, and activist (left during freshman year)
- Frank Mechau, major Western artist
- Duane Michals, art photographer
- Ken Michelman, TV actor, The White Shadow, Grey's Anatomy, The West Wing
- Mary Obering, noted modern abstract painter
- Isidore Okpewho, scholar of African oral literature, novelist
- Paul Quinichette, tenor saxophonist
- Scott Mitchell Rosenberg, film producer, Men in Black, Cowboys and Aliens
- Ted Shackelford, television actor, Knots Landing
- Paul Sharits, avant-garde/abstract filmmaker
- Ted Shawn, modern dancer
- Neil Simon, playwright and screenwriter
- Sinbad, born David Adkins, comedian and actor
- Rodney Stark, author, professor, and sociologist of religion
- Morton Subotnick, electronic musician
- Josh Taylor, comedy and dramatic television actor
- Hao Jiang Tian, basso cantante opera singer
- Cedar Walton, jazz pianist
- John Edward Williams, author

== Other ==
- Margaret L. Curry, state parole officer
- Sumiko Hennessy (PhD, 1978), Japanese-American academic, social worker, and activist for the Asian American community in Denver
- Harold Franklin, professor, first Black student at Auburn University
- Nancy Golden, professor, chief education officer of Oregon, 2013–2015
- Mary Ann Kerwin, J.D. 1986, co-founder of the La Leche League
- Dottie Lamm (MSW, 1967), former First Lady of Colorado
- Sue Miller (M.A. counseling psychology and counselor education, 2009), breast cancer activist
- Pauline Short Robinson (B.S. 1943), first African-American librarian in Denver

== See also ==
- List of colleges and universities in Colorado
