= Evanston Art Center =

Arts center in Illinois, U.S.

Coordinates: 42°03′52″N 87°41′49″W

The Evanston Art Center is an arts center in Evanston, Illinois offering classes, lectures, exhibitions, and community outreach. It is among the oldest and largest arts centers in Illinois.

== History ==
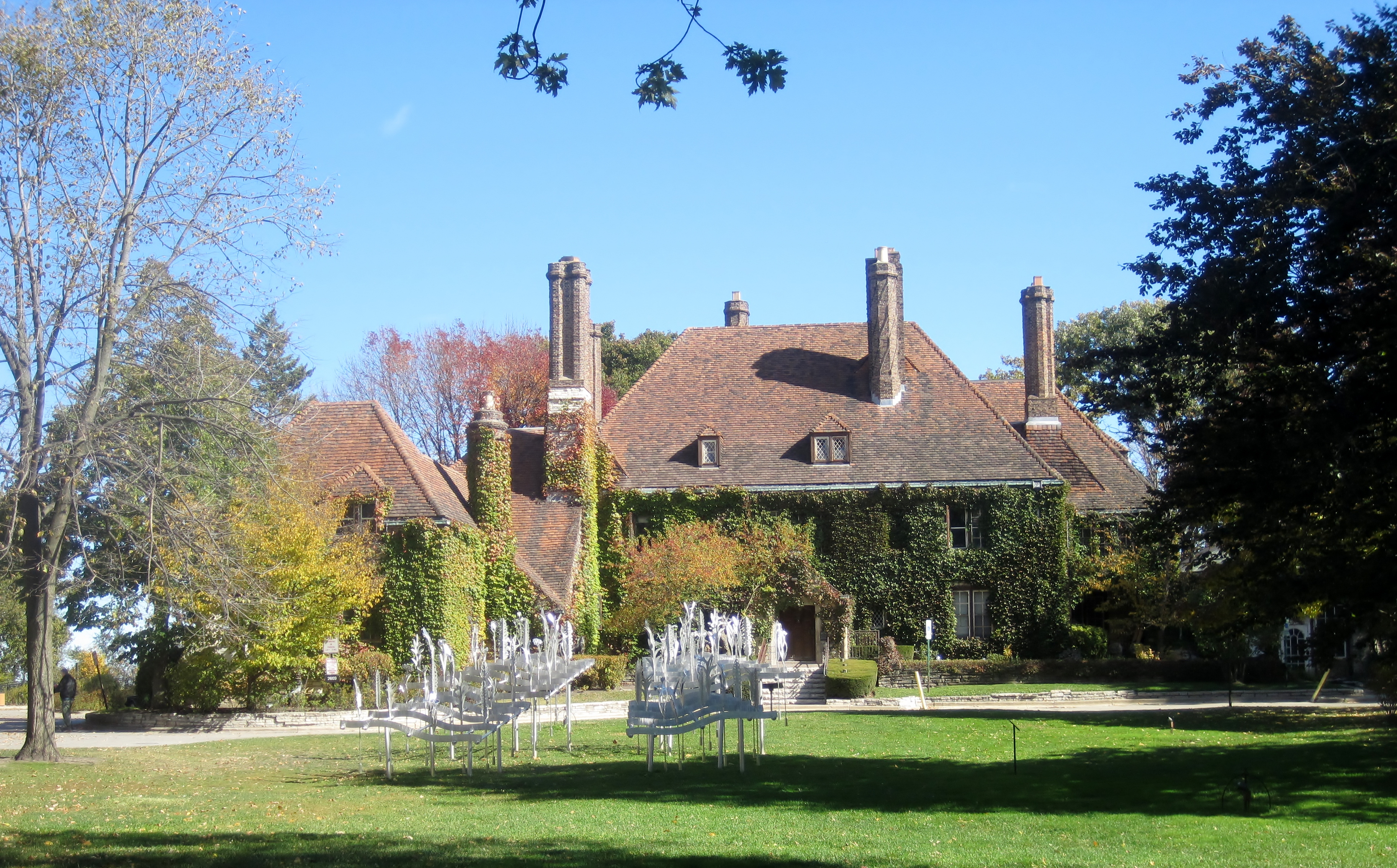
The Harley Clarke Mansion was the home of the Evanston Art Center from 1966 to 2015.

The Evanston Art Center was founded in October, 1929. It was officially incorporated as a non-profit organization in 1942.

The center was originally located in the basement of the Evanston Public Library until it began leasing the historical Harley Clarke Mansion at Lighthouse Beach in 1966. The center rented additional studio space at the Noyes Cultural Arts Center in the 1980s. In 2015, the center moved to its current location at 1717 Central Street in Evanston, Illinois, a 20,000 sq. ft. former office building, which considerably expanded the available space. The move was funded by a capital campaign that raised $2.5 million.

== Notable people ==
=== Artists and students ===
Artists who were students or who exhibited at Evanston Art Center:

- Jane Fulton Alt, photographer
- Carol Diehl, painter, art critic, and poet
- Fay Peck (1931–2016), American Expressionist painter and printmaker

=== Teachers ===
- George Cohen (1919–1999), painter and Northwestern University faculty
- Harry Mintz (1904–2002), Polish-American painter and professor at Washington University in St. Louis and later at the School of the Art Institute of Chicago
- Corey Postiglione (born 1942), American abstract artist
- Alice Riley (1860–1955), poet; co-founder of the Evanston Art Center
- Paul Wieghardt (1897–1969), German-American painter and professor

== Exhibitions ==
Past exhibitions held at the Art Center include:

- 2018 – Multiple Perspectives featured photography-based works by Columbia College Chicago faculty member Fred Camper and two other artists.
- 2018 – Catching Light: The Art of Architecture, which featured works by Heather Hancock and Jack Nixon, was "an exhibition that considers the architecture and design of our intertwined natural and manmade landscapes."
- 2017 – Through Darkness to Light: Photographs Along the Underground Railroad, a multimedia exhibition including photographs by Jeanine Michna-Bales.
- 2017 – New Work, which featured abstract pieces by Annette Turow and Linda Robinson Gordon.
- 2017 – Undefinable: Women’s Health in America, curated by Chicago artist Caren Helene Rudman and including works by herself and nine other female artists, featured commentaries on women's health in the United States.
- 2011 – Dimensional Lines: Art + Dress featured a collaboration between artists and fashion designers curated by SAIC’s Fashion Resource Center Director Gillion Carrara.
