= Seth Barnes Nicholson =

American astronomer

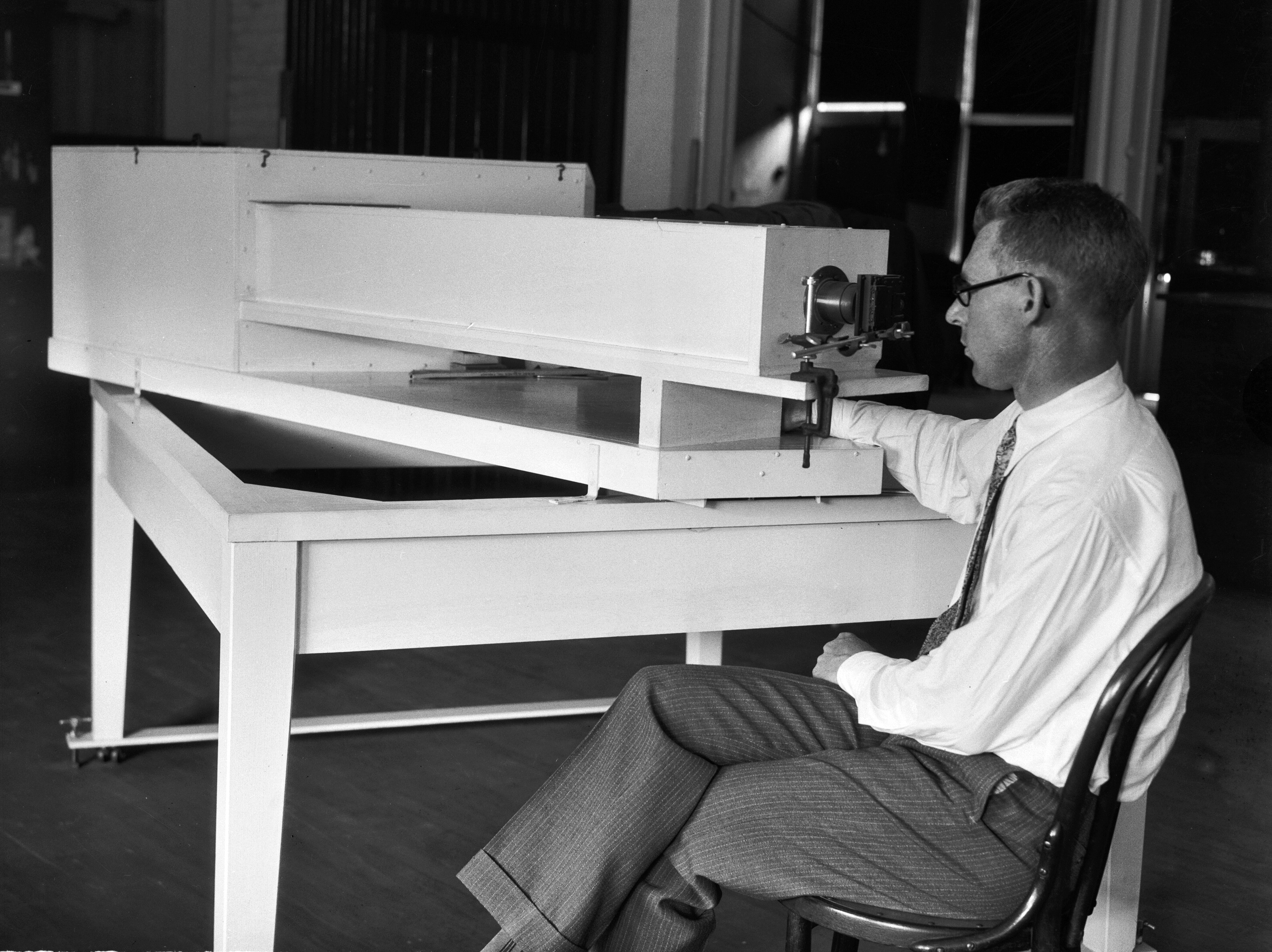
- Born: November 12, 1891; Springfield, Illinois, U.S.
- Died: July 2, 1963 (aged 71); Los Angeles, California, U.S.
- Education: Drake University
- Awards: Bruce Medal (1963)
- Scientific career
- Fields: astronomy
- Workplaces: Mount Wilson Observatory

Seth Barnes Nicholson (November 12, 1891 – July 2, 1963) was an American astronomer. He worked at the Lick observatory in California, and is known for discovering several moons of Jupiter in the 20th century.

Asteroids discovered: 2
| 878 Mildred | September 6, 1916 |
| 1647 Menelaus | June 23, 1957 |

Nicholson was born in Springfield, Illinois, and was raised in rural Illinois. He was educated at Drake University, where he became interested in astronomy. On May 29, 1913, he was married to Alma Stotts, a fellow student at Drake then the University of California at Berkeley. They would have three children: Margaret, Donald, and Jean.

In 1914, at the University of California's Lick Observatory, while observing the recently discovered Jovian moon Pasiphaë, he discovered a new one, Sinope, whose orbit he computed for his Ph.D. thesis in 1915.

He spent his entire career at Mount Wilson Observatory, where he discovered three more Jovian moons: Lysithea and Carme in 1938, and Ananke in 1951. While at the Palomar Observatory in 1957, he discovered 1647 Menelaus, an asteroid near Jupiter. Other work included computing the orbits of several comets and also that of Pluto.

Sinope, Lysithea, Carme, and Ananke were simply designated as "Jupiter IX", "Jupiter X", "Jupiter XI", and "Jupiter XII". They were not given their present names until 1975. Nicholson himself declined to propose names.

At Mt. Wilson, his main assignment concerned solar activity and he produced for decades annual reports on sunspot activity. He also made a number of eclipse expeditions to measure the brightness and temperature of the Sun's corona.

In the early 1920s, he and Edison Pettit made the first systematic infrared observations of celestial objects. They used a vacuum thermocouple to measure the infrared radiation and thus the temperature of the Moon which led to the theory that the Moon was covered with a thin layer of dust acting as an insulator, and also of the planets, sunspots and stars. Their temperatures measurements of nearby giant stars led to some of the first determinations of stellar diameters.

Nicholson, together with astronomer George Ellery Hale, lend their name to the "Hale-Nicholson law" concerning the magnetic polarity of sunspots.

From 1943 to 1955, he served as editor of the Publications of the Astronomical Society of the Pacific, of which he was also twice president.

He died in Los Angeles. His final resting place is in dispute, but he was cremated and his remains were likely dispersed by his son.

== Awards and honors ==
- Awarded the Bruce Medal (1963)
- The asteroid 1831 Nicholson, the lunar crater Nicholson, the Martian crater Nicholson, and the feature Nicholson Regio on Ganymede were named after him.

== See also ==
- Timeline of discovery of Solar System planets and their moons
- Myrtle L. Richmond
