= Mary Gehr =

American painter and printmaker

Mary Gehr (1910–1997) was an American painter and printmaker.

== Biography ==
Born in Chicago, Gehr studied at Smith College, the School of the Art Institute of Chicago, and the Institute of Design at the Illinois Institute of Technology; her instructors included Paul Wieghardt and Misch Kohn. Gehr left Smith before graduation to pursue a career in dance. she danced with the Chicago Opera Company for four seasons, and she spent three years with the notable Ruth Page dance company: the Page-Stone Ballet; she had a featured role in the premiere of the ballet Frankie and Johnny.

=== Dancer turned artist ===
Her father's death in 1936 precipitated her return home to Chicago, where she got a job working in advertising. She began classes at the Art Institute during this time, to aid her in her new career. The classes made Gehr realize she wanted to be an artist. During her career Gehr specialized in batik and intaglio. She worked as an illustrator as well, producing illustrations for over two dozen books for Children's Press, some of which she also wrote. Several of her pieces are in the collection of the Art Institute of Chicago; she is also represented in the holdings of the Philadelphia Museum of Art, the Free Library of Philadelphia, and the Library of Congress. Gehr was married to the designer Burt Ray, who predeceased her; she was also a loving stepmother to Burt’s daughter, Virginia, and to two granddaughters, Sharon and Diane.

== Works ==
https://www.artic.edu/artworks/45106/danzantes
