= Jane Fulton Alt =

American photographer

Jane Fulton Alt (born May 26, 1951) is an American photographer who explores issues of love, loss, and spirituality in her work. Alt was the recipient of the 2007 Illinois Art Council Fellowship Award and the 2007, 2008 and 2009 Ragdale Fellowship Award.

== Biography ==
Jane Fulton Alt was born in Chicago in 1951 and has been active in the arts much of her lifetime. She studied at the Evanston Art Center, Columbia College, and the Art Institute of Chicago.

== Work ==
Alt is a clinical social worker, in practice since the 1970s. She bridged her professions in New Orleans following Hurricane Katrina when she accompanied residents of the Lower Ninth Ward to examine the damage to their houses as part of the "Look and Leave" program organized by the City of New Orleans and the American Red Cross. Her exhibition at the DePaul University Art Museum entitled "Look and Leave: New Orleans in the Wake of Katrina" was recognized as one of the Top 5 Photography Museum Shows in Chicago in 2006. Her work is published in the books Katrina Exposed and New Orleans: The Making of an Urban Landscape (3rd ed), and also in American Tragedy: New Orleans Under Water (Callaloo 30, no 3, Summer 2007).

Alt's Katrina work culminated with the publication of her own book, Look and Leave: Photographs and Stories from New Orleans's Lower Ninth Ward, in 2009. The book received critical acclaim and was featured on 89.9 WWNO, NPR's New Orleans affiliate, and Chicago Tonight's "Arts Across Illinois" segment.

Her Katrina work has also been featured on NPR's Chicago station.

== Exhibitions ==
Alt has had solo exhibitions in Chicago (Chicago Cultural Center, Artemisia Gallery, Flatfile Gallery, Fourth Presbyterian Church, Depaul University Art Museum, Morton College, Art Chicago), San Francisco (Corden/Potts Gallery), Poland (International Festival of Photography) and Syria (International Photography Festival).

== Publications ==
- Alt, Jane Fulton. "Look and Leave: Photographs and Stories from New Orleans's Lower Ninth Ward." UGA Press, 2009. ISBN 978-1-930066-90-8.
- Boyd, Terry, City 2000. 1st Ed. 3 Book Publishing, Distributed by University of Illinois Press, 2006. ISBN 978-0-252-03177-9. Alt is one of 39 photographers whose works are shown.
- Maklansky, Steven, ed. Katrina Exposed: A Photographic Reckoning. New Orleans Museum of Art, 2006: Exhibition Catalogue. ISBN 0-89494-102-X.

== Permanent collections ==
Alt's work can be found in the permanent collections of the Smithsonian Photographic History Collection at the National Museum of American History, the Southeast Museum of Photography in Daytona, Florida, the Museum of Fine Arts in Houston, the New Orleans Museum of Art, Yale University Beinecke Library, DePaul University Art Museum, Centro Fotografico Alvarez Bravo in Oaxaca, Mexico, the Dancing Bear collection of William Hunt and the Midwest Print Project of the Museum of Contemporary Photography.
