= Garo, Colorado =

Ghost town in Park County, Colorado, United States

Town of Garo
- Ghost Town
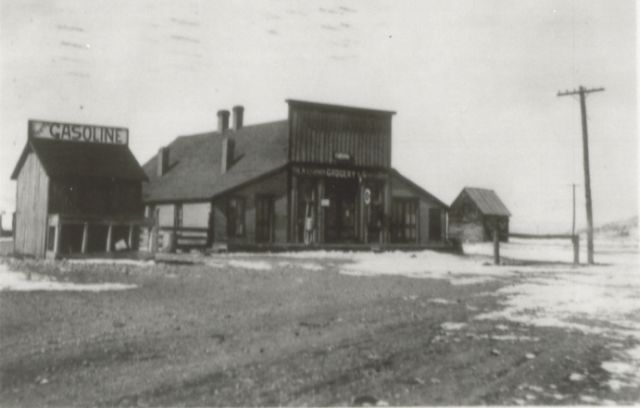
- Garo in 1917

- Location within Colorado Location within the United States
- Coordinates: 39.1078°N 105.8903°W
- Country: United States
- State: State of Colorado
- County: Park County

Garo is an extinct town in South Park in Park County, Colorado, United States. The Garo post office operated from January 29, 1880, until February 28, 1955.

== Description ==
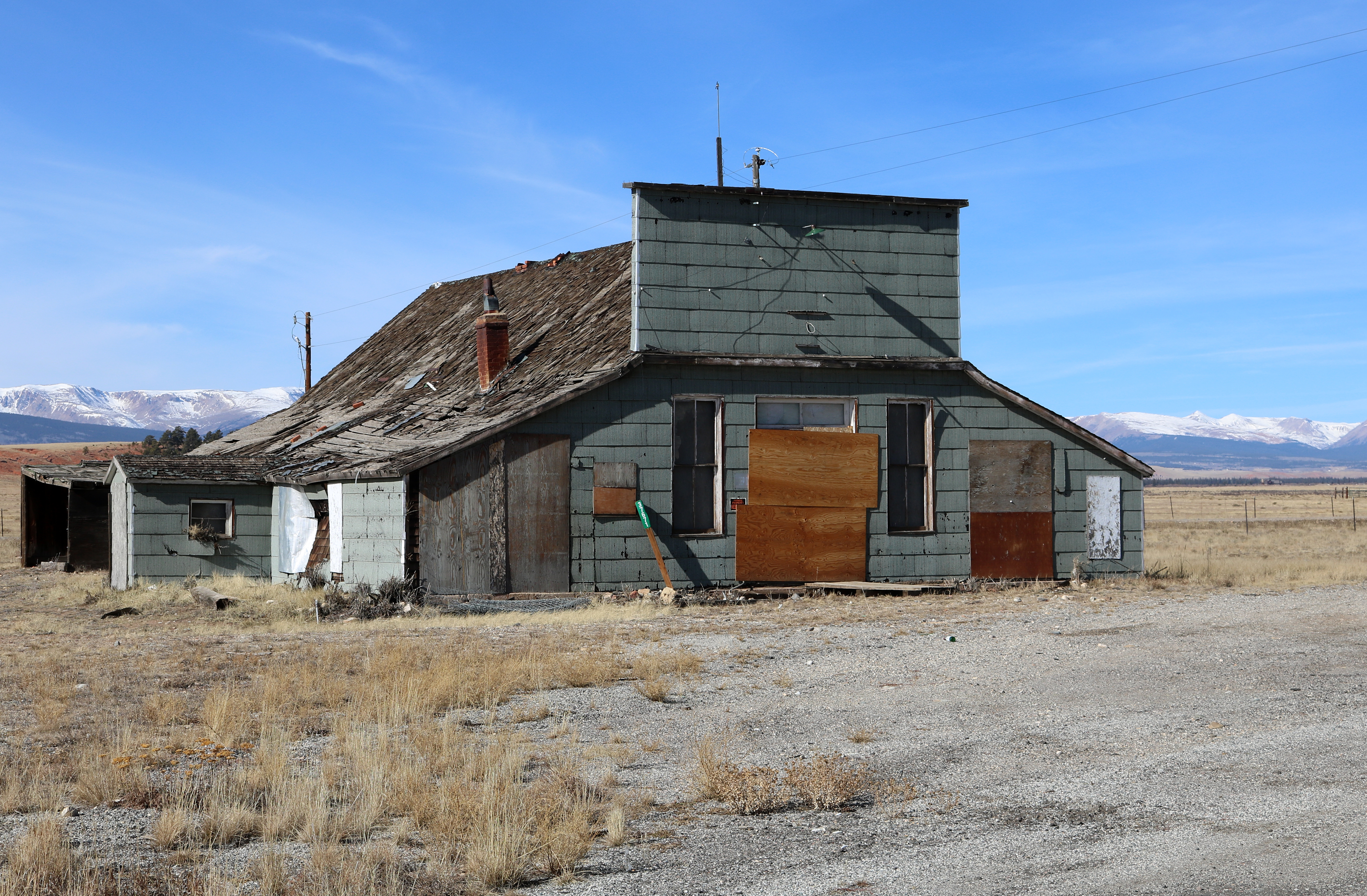
Garo in 2017

The now ghost town is about five miles (8.0 km) north of Hartsel and seven miles (11 km) south of Fairplay along Colorado Highway 9, at an elevation of 9,197 feet (2,803 m).

The community was named after its founder, the area ranchers Marie Guiraud, and for her late husband, Louis Adolfe Guiraud, both natives of France.

== Notable people ==
- Cleo Spurlock Wallace

== See also ==
- Bibliography of Colorado
- Geography of Colorado
- History of Colorado
- Index of Colorado-related articles
- List of Colorado-related lists
  - List of ghost towns in Colorado
  - List of post offices in Colorado
- Outline of Colorado
