= Jeanine Michna-Bales =

American photographer

- Born: 1971 (age 54–55); Midland, Michigan
- Education: University of Florida
- Known for: Photography, photographic essays, visual history
- Website: Jeanine Michna-Bales

Jeanine Michna-Bales, Decision to Leave, Magnolia Plantation on the Cane River, Louisiana, from Through Darkness to Light: Photographs Along the Underground Railroad, 2013.

Jeanine Michna-Bales (born 1971) is an American artist who works primarily through photographic essays. Her projects blend documentary and fine art, research and history, examining forgotten, overlooked or invisible aspects of American history and contemporary socio-politics. She has often juxtaposed evocative landscape photographs and historical re-enactments with primary source documents such as maps, news clippings, government materials and artifacts in order to bring to life specific moments, experiences, places and eras from the past. New York Times writer and cultural historian Maurice Berger called her project on the Underground Railroad evocative and consequential in its visual portrayal of history through the eyes of an individual: "Her photographs are dark, atmospheric and haunting … They evoke both a sense of the adventure and peril of this journey, one that would have dire consequences if unsuccessful."

Michna-Bales's work has been exhibited at institutions including the Alexandria Black History Museum, Hunter Museum of American Art, Museum of Contemporary Art Jacksonville, National Museum of Nuclear Science & History, Portland Art Museum, and Open Society Foundations. It belongs to the permanent collections of the Duke University Archive of Documentary Arts, Library of Congress, Museum of Fine Arts, Houston, and Phillips Collection, among others. Her books include Through Darkness to Light: Photographs Along the Underground Railroad (2017), Standing Together: Inez Milholland’s Final Campaign for Women’s Suffrage (2021), and Countdown: A Visual Exploration of the Cold War's Opposing Architecture (co-authored with Adam Reynolds, 2022).

== Biography ==
Michna-Bales was born in Midland, Michigan in 1971 and grew up in Indiana. She majored in advertising and minored in art at the University of Florida (BS, 1994) and initially worked as an advertising art director. While living in San Francisco, she studied photography and eventually turned to fine art after moving to Dallas in 2005. In addition to her museum shows, she has had solo exhibitions at PDNB Gallery (Dallas, 2017–21), Arnika Dawkins Gallery (Atlanta, 2017–21), The Phillips Collection (2019), and AIRIE Nest Gallery (Everglades National Park, 2020), among other venues. She is based in Dallas.

== Photographic essays ==
Michna-Bales's project, Through Darkness to Light: Seeking Freedom on the Underground Railroad (2002–16), photographically reconstructed a single, possible 1,400-mile Underground Railroad passage north from Louisiana to Ontario, Canada, documenting a history still largely invisible because it was conducted undercover and in secret. It involved ten years of research and extensive travel, culminating in a touring exhibition organized by Mid-America Arts Alliance's ExhibitsUSA (2017–27) and a book containing a foreword by civil rights leader Andrew Young, scholarly essays, accounts by passengers themselves, and other historical materials. The photographs, primarily nocturnal landscapes devoid of people, were shot from a first-person point of view at night when freedom seekers would have been traveling.

The essay's narrative, aided by descriptive and allegorical image titles, progresses dramatically from a ramshackle plantation cabin (Decision to Leave, 2013) through gradually brightening forests, swamps and safe houses to ultimate deliverance (the sunlit images, Within Reach and Freedom, 2014). Critics described the photographs as "heavy with atmosphere," "dark and brooding," and "haunting, but hopeful," with a palpable sense of the risk, fear, uncertainty and physical challenge of the journey. Hyperallergic's Claire Voon wrote, "Michna-Bales’s images explore the famous passageway in an unprecedented way. Her contemporary perspective stirs our senses, with the quiet environments inviting us to not only reflect on these covert, risk-filled voyages but to also imagine ourselves embarking on one of our own."

Jeanine Michna-Bales, Survival Chances, Former Indianapolis Civil Defense Headquarters, Indiana, from the Fallout series, 2016. Text from Survival Under Atomic Attack, 1950.

In a subsequent project, The Four Moments of the Sun (2015–present), Michna-Bales took a similar approach to document the forgotten history of Florida's late-18th and 19th-century "maroon" communities—free and formerly enslaved Africans who settled deep in the wilderness of the Everglades to maintain their freedom.

In two photo essays, Michna-Bales explored existential threats, past and present. Fallout (2013–22) documented intact, hidden or underground nuclear fallout shelters in fourteen cities—as well as related propaganda—left behind by the Cold War generation, through photographs, declassified government documents and old newspaper articles. The shelters—many still containing canned food and furniture—were endorsed by official civil defense programs despite being largely placebos, a fact made evident in chilling official documents detailing casualty estimates. Reviews described Michna-Bales's unpopulated images as quiet studies in architecture that served as "haunting time capsules" revealing the era's sense of dread and instability. In 2021, the project was paired with another by photographer Adam Reynolds documenting U.S. nuclear missile silos in a six-museum traveling exhibition, "Two Minutes to Midnight and the Architecture of Armageddon" (2021–6), which formed the basis of their Countdown (2022) book.

In Terra Fractura (2015–present), Michna-Bales examined the negative and unstudied impacts of fracking, which has transformed previously safe communities into active, man-made earthquake zones in eight US states. The project consisted of earthquake epicenter portraits depicting an array of everyday landscapes, from rural backyards to freeways in affected areas in Dallas-Ft. Worth, which sits above the Barnett Shale formation. Lenscratch Magazine's Linda Alterwitz wrote that Michna-Bales's use of light, shadow, movement and composition conveyed "an inviting and simultaneously threatening sense of place."

Jeanine Michna-Bales, Ready for Battle, from Standing Together: Inez Milholland's Final Campaign for Women's Suffrage, 2019.

Employing a mix of photographs and contextual material, Michna-Bales's Standing Together: Photographs of Inez Milholland’s Final Campaign for Women’s Suffrage (2016–20), provided a visual account of a largely forgotten, heroic chapter in that movement's history: the story of Inez Milholland, a lawyer, journalist and activist at the forefront of the women's suffrage cause. After leading the landmark Woman Suffrage Procession in Washington, DC on horseback, she was sent by the National Woman's Party on a 12,000-mile, 28-day barnstorming campaign across eight Western states in October 1916 to oppose the re-election of President Woodrow Wilson, who had failed to prioritize suffrage. Milholland suffered from pernicious anemia and was run ragged by the grueling schedule—50 speaking engagements in 21 days. She collapsed onstage in Los Angeles and died that November, at age 30.

Michna-Bales's photo essay entailed four years of research and took the form of exhibitions and a book. It included more than 90 color photographs juxtaposed with period documents, news clippings, letters, announcements and vignettes (some digitally tinted to resemble turn-of-the-century autochromes). Among them was a reproduction of a 1916 Rand-McNally railroad map that Michna-Bales hand-embroidered with a yellow stitched line marking Milholland’s journey. The photographs consisted of painterly landscapes chronicling vistas, flora and fauna that Milholland described in letters as well as staged still life and re-enactment images using diverse stand-ins to depict moments in her journey. The series opens with Ready for Battle (2019)—an image of a woman in a suffrage dress, sash and crown holding an American flag like a sentinel atop a grassy hill—and closes with Transitioning (2019), which shows a woman in a white dress wading into the waves of the Pacific Ocean; a series of hazy, out-of-focus photographs allude to Milholland's deteriorating health and the delusional visions brought on by her turn-of-the-century prescriptions.

== Collections and recognition ==
Michna-Bales's work belongs to the permanent collections of the Archive of Documentary Arts at Duke University, Everglades National Park, Harn Museum of Art, Hunter Museum of American Art, Library of Congress, Museum of Fine Arts, Houston, Nelson-Atkins Museum of Art, Phillips Collection, Portland Art Museum, and Princeton University Art Museum, among others. She has been recognized as one of Photolucida's "Critical Mass Top 50" photographers in 2014 and 2017, by awards from the Houston Center for Photography (2014) and Archive of Documentary Arts (2016), and with a residency from Artists in Residence in Everglades (AIRIE) in 2018. She has been a featured speaker at symposiums and panel discussions at many institutions, such as the National Gallery of Art.

== Books ==
- Michna-Bales, Jeanine (2017). Through Darkness to Light: Photographs Along the Underground Railroad, New York: Princeton Architectural Press
- Michna-Bales, Jeanine (2021). Standing Together: Inez Milholland's Final Campaign for Women's Suffrage, New York: MW Editions
- Michna-Bales, Jeanine and Adam Reynolds (2022). Countdown: A Visual Exploration of the Cold War’s Opposing Architecture, Atlanta, GA: Yoffy Press
