= Alice Riley =

American writer

Alice Cushing Donaldson Riley (1860 – 1955) was an American author and arts club founder. She is known for her children's poetry, stories, books, songs, and several one-act plays. She established art clubs and art centers in Illinois, including the Riley Circle, which led to the Drama Club of Evanston; she also inspired the Drama League of America, was a charter club member of the Garden Club of Evanston, and co-founded the Evanston Arts Center.

Her best known work was "Slumber Boat", a children's lullaby co-written with her dear friend Dorothy "Jessie" L. Gaynor.

== Biography ==
Riley was born March 18, 1863, on a farm near Morrison, Illinois, in Whiteside County, and died in Pasadena, California, in 1953. She lived for a good portion of her life in Evanston, Illinois, from 1898 until 1931, where she raised her children and wrote children's lyrics, plays, operettas, and stories.

Riley was raised by strict parents who did not encourage her or her sisters to dance or play cards at home. Instead they amused themselves with housework and games such as authors, dominoes, and jack-straws. However, music always filled her house, as her father played the cello and sang tenor in the church choir, while her sisters played the piano and sang. Even as a very young child she enjoyed the excitement of getting dressed up in a new outfit for a trip into the village square.

At age 16 she saw her first play, Richard Wagner's Tannhäuser, performed by Gilmore's Band at the local opera house, which excited her enormously. Her interest in drama became well established and secured a lifelong interest in the arts.

Along with a passion for drama, Riley developed a keen interest in gardening at a very young age. Her ailing grandfather lived with the Riley family from the time Riley was six years old until his death, and he demanded she tend the garden with him.

== Personal life ==
Alice Cushing Donaldson married Harrison Riley April 3, 1889, and had two children, Donald and Dorothy. Alice and Harrison lived at 1822 Sheridan Road in Evanston, Illinois (now demolished), before retiring to Pasadena, California.

== Career ==
Through the influence of her cousin Sara Collins, Riley moved to Chicago in 1885 to teach primary grade girls at the Park Institute finishing school. In her spare time she learned French and music at the school. At the end of her term at the school she moved to Nebraska to work with her brother-in-law Harry Palmer, copying records from the county clerk's office, which led to work at the Statehouse in Lincoln, Nebraska. When she returned to Chicago, Riley resumed weekly French lessons while rooming on Warren Ave in Chicago. It is here she met her neighbor Dorothy (Jessie) L. Gaynor in 1896.

Gaynor started a music class, which Riley joined, and they soon exchanged lessons; Riley taught Gaynor French, while Gaynor taught Riley music composition. Riley made up some lyrics to finish her lesson on lullabies, and Gaynor was so impressed she asked her to write lyrics for a song for her daughter. They quickly began collaborating with Riley's writing lyrics and Gaynor's putting them to music. The songs they collaborated on were mostly for children, finding inspiration from the domestic scene.

Their best-known collaboration is called "Slumber Boat", which Gaynor sang in her recital work. Soon, the song received notoriety and they were approached by an agent from John Church Company of Cincinnati, Ohio, who wanted to publish a children's kindergarten book. The resulting book, Playtime Songs, was very successful all over the United States and in Canada, England, and English schools in Japan.

In 1901, Riley got in the habit of having her friend Marie Bartlett over for tea on Thursday afternoons. Initially, she would read while Marie sewed and they discussed current events. Soon other neighbors joined in, and before long, the expanding group was named the Riley Circle. The Riley Circle met at her home in Evanston for many years following the same format, but a lecture given by James O'Donnell Bennett at the Chicago Woman's Club proved critical and changed the Riley Circle agenda from discussing current affairs to reading plays. At the lecture, O'Donnell stressed that Chicago needed to develop an educated audience for drama and the immense influence women could bring toward this goal. Riley credits this lecture for the idea to transform the Riley Circle into the Drama Club of Evanston. The organization was formally founded in 1909, making it the first drama club in the world, according to The Evanston Review, April 24, 1947.

In 1929 Riley spent her time between her two residences in Evanston, Illinois, and Pasadena, California, and it was during this time she co-founded the Evanston Art Center. On a trip back to Evanston in September 1929, she outlined the plan for the Arts Center, collaborated with the library board and put through all resolutions and programs. By October 1929, Riley and the Art Center committee had appointed all committee members and planned details for the Art Center opening which was held October 28, 1929, in the center's rooms at the Evanston Public Library. Through her work in the Riley Circle, the Drama Club of Evanston and the Evanston Arts Center, Riley galvanized interest in the arts in Evanston. She provided a forum for like minded women to discuss the local arts scene and made the arts come alive in Evanston, a city which today still boasts a vibrant arts scene.

Her best known published works are: Songs of the Child World, Lilts and Lyrics, and The Lost Princess Bo-Peep, in collaboration with the composer, Jessie Gaynor (1863–1921). Her best-known lyrics are probably the words to the lullaby entitled "The Slumber Boat" (later also known as "The American Cradle Song"), published in 1898, which she wrote for her own children:

Baby's boat the silver moon/Sailing in the sky,
Sailing o'er the sea of sleep,/While the clouds go by.

[Refrain:]

Sail baby, sail,/Out upon that sea

Only don't forget to sail/Back again to me.

Baby's fishing for a dream,/Fishing near and far,
His line a silver moonbeam is,/His bait a silver star.

[Repeat Refrain]
