= Harley Clarke Mansion =

Historic building in Illinois

The mansion in 2020

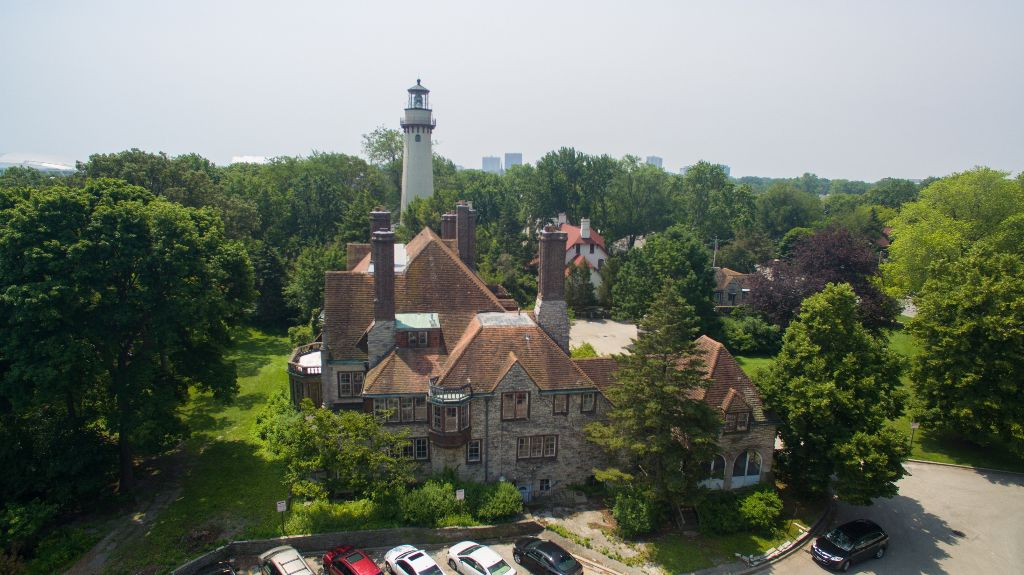
An aerial view of the Harley Clarke mansion's north-facing elevation

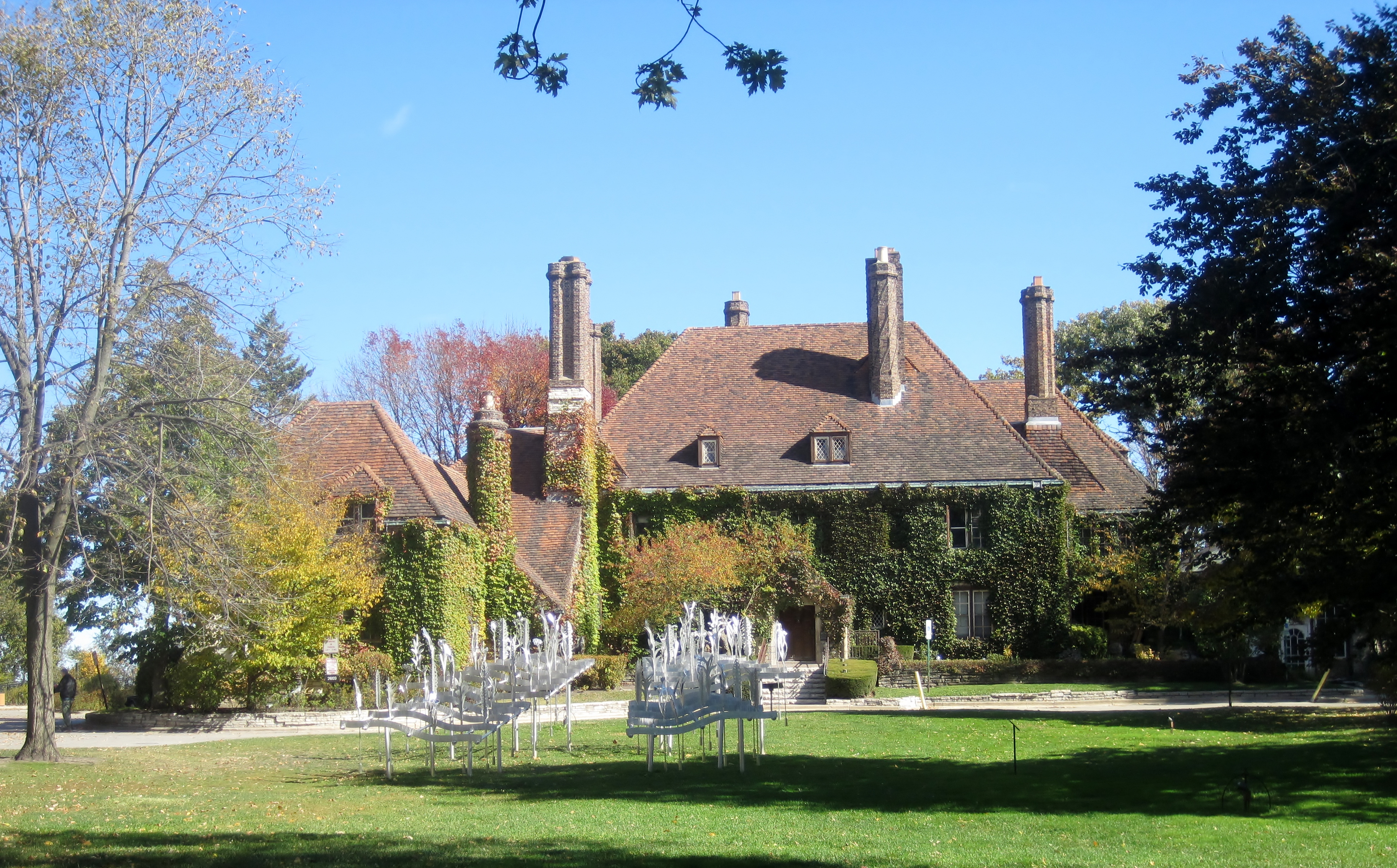
The Harley Clarke Mansions' front, west-facing elevation

The Harley Clarke Mansion consists of a French Eclectic-style house and coach house located at 2603 Sheridan Road in Evanston, Illinois, adjacent to the historic Grosse Pointe Light and Lighthouse Beach on Lake Michigan. Cited as a contributing structure for the Northeast Evanston Historic District that Evanston established with the National Park Service in 1999, it is listed on the National Register of Historic Places.

In 2016, Landmarks Illinois added the Harley Clarke Mansion to its list of most endangered historic places in Illinois.

== Architecture ==
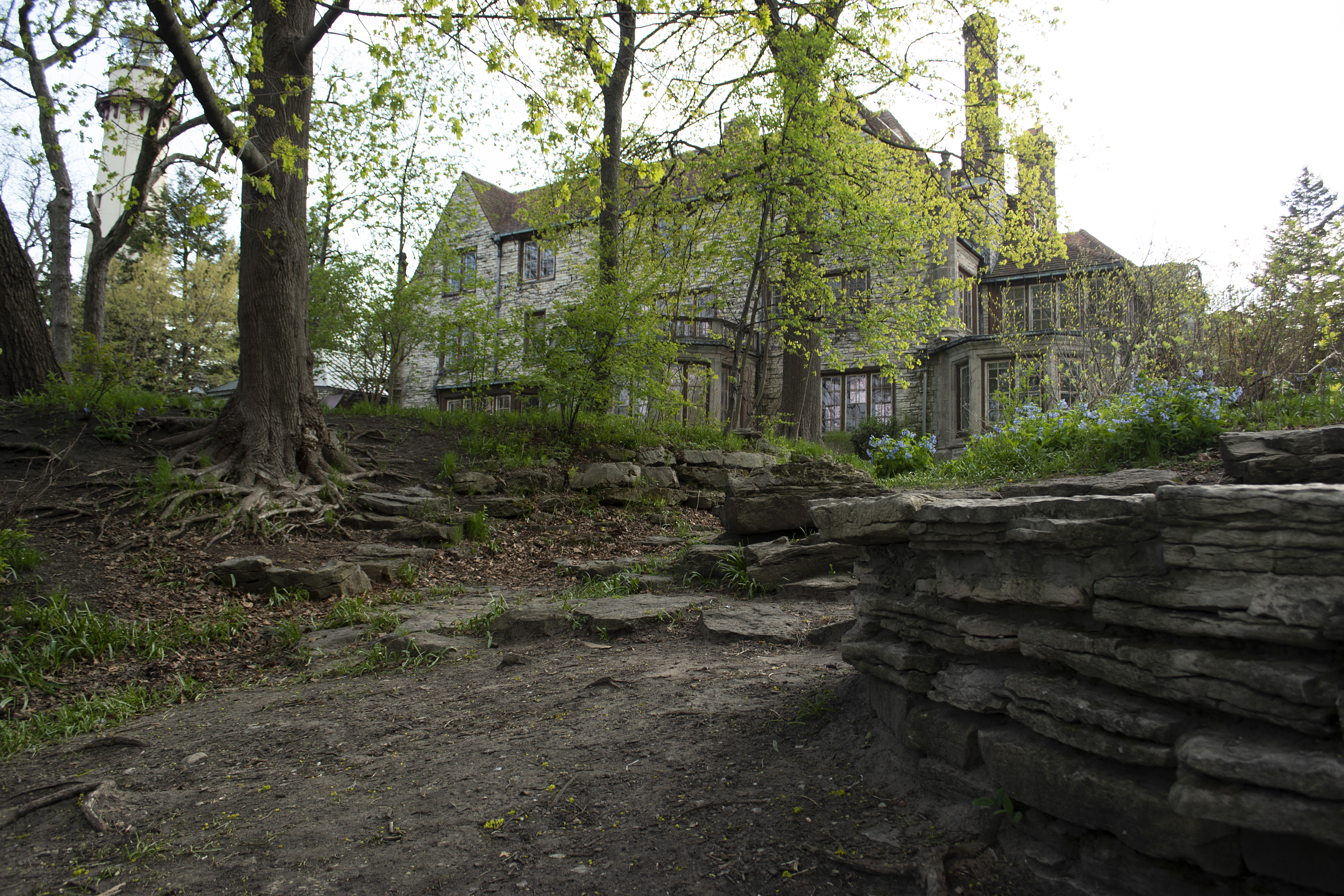
View of the rear of the house, seen from the wooded bluff

The three-story, 16-room, limestone mansion was originally situated on nearly five acres of lakefront property landscaped by Jens Jensen, a Prairie School landscape architect, in collaboration with Alfred Caldwell. Amongst the elements of the landscape was an informal wooded landscape on the bluff down to the home's private sand beach. This wooded bluff featured grassy clearings, and an "Indian Council Ring" (the latter being a personal signature of Jensen's landscapes). While the landscape has since been changed, several features of the original design currently remain. This includes a hemlock-shaded pond with waterfall, a council ring, many terraces and pathways, as well as portions of the original plantings.

The approximately 18,500-square-foot mansion includes seven bedrooms, a spacious glass conservatory, ballroom, basement rumpus room and coach house—as well as six towering chimneys, and a curving stair hall.

The house itself was supposed to be modeled after sixteenth century English Tudor country homes. Its red Ludowici tile roof has been said to suggest some Norman influence. The house has Cotswold-style appearance due to its random-coursed ashlar masonry walls, which are adorned by both carved limestone and red sandstone trim.

The house's chimneys tower above its roofline. The primary roofline of the house descends towards its lower levels through swooping eaves.

The main portion of the house is laid-out on a north–south orientation, lying parallel to the lakeshore. At the house's northern end is a section that was originally built as a service wing. The service wing has a lower roofline than the main portion of the house, and was laid out perpendicular to the house (on an east–west orientation).

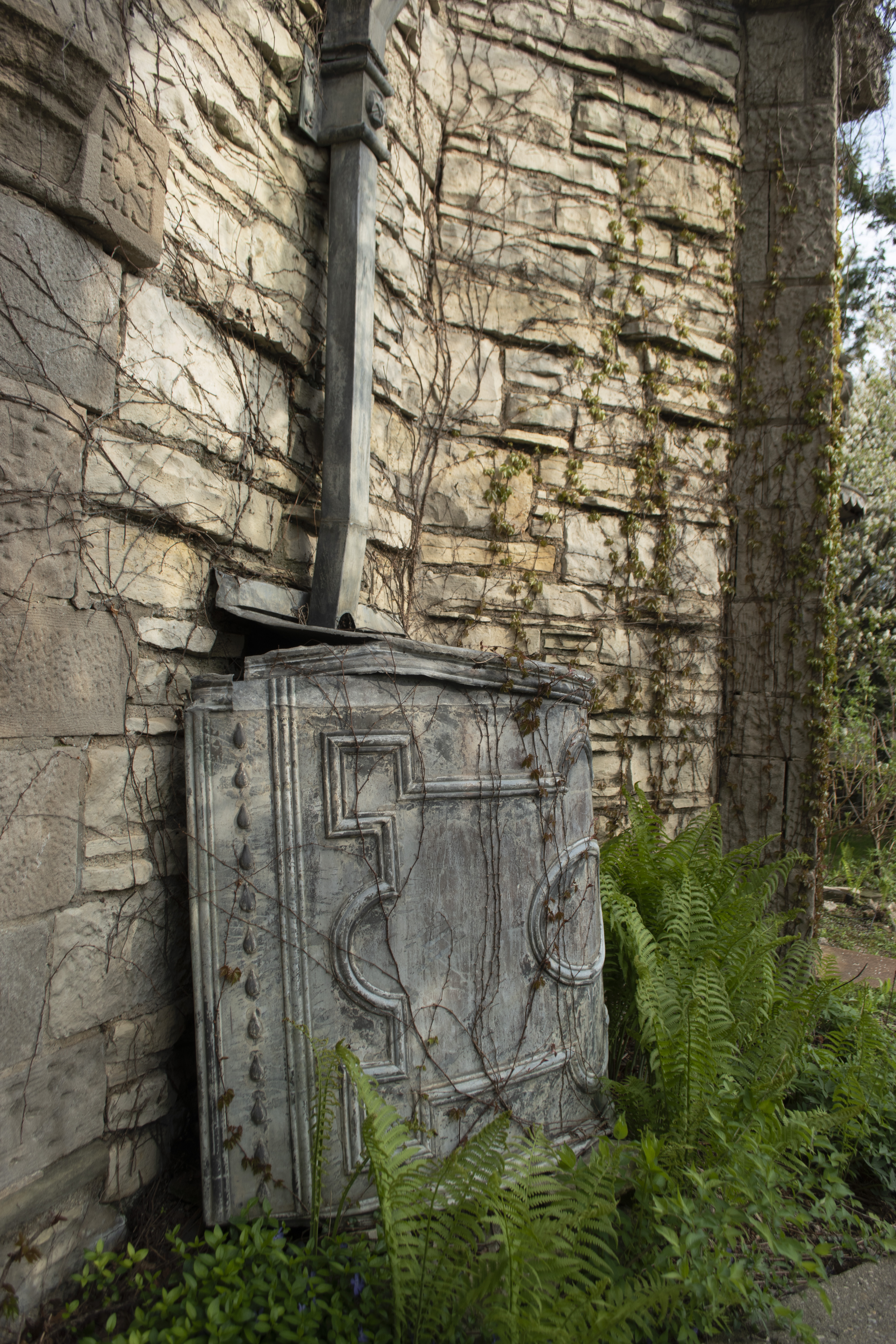
Decorative downspout and cistern

The exterior of the house's main entrance is topped by a large statue of a flower bouquet. At the front of the house, ornamental lead rain gutter downspouts empty into ornamental semicircular metal cisterns. The home's main entrance hall is an elegant ovular wood-paneled space featuring a curving staircase, a fireplace. The entry hall has a view of Lake Michigan, visible through the tall windows of the home's east-facing bay-windowed sun porch, which is placed on a direct east–west axis from the entry.

The house's principal spaces on its ground floor were placed in an ensuite layout along the back side of the house, giving them lake views. The interior vista of the house's north–south axis culminated with the dining room fireplace at its north end, and on a door to the conservatory at its south end (which provided a view of year-round greenery to the home's principal spaces).

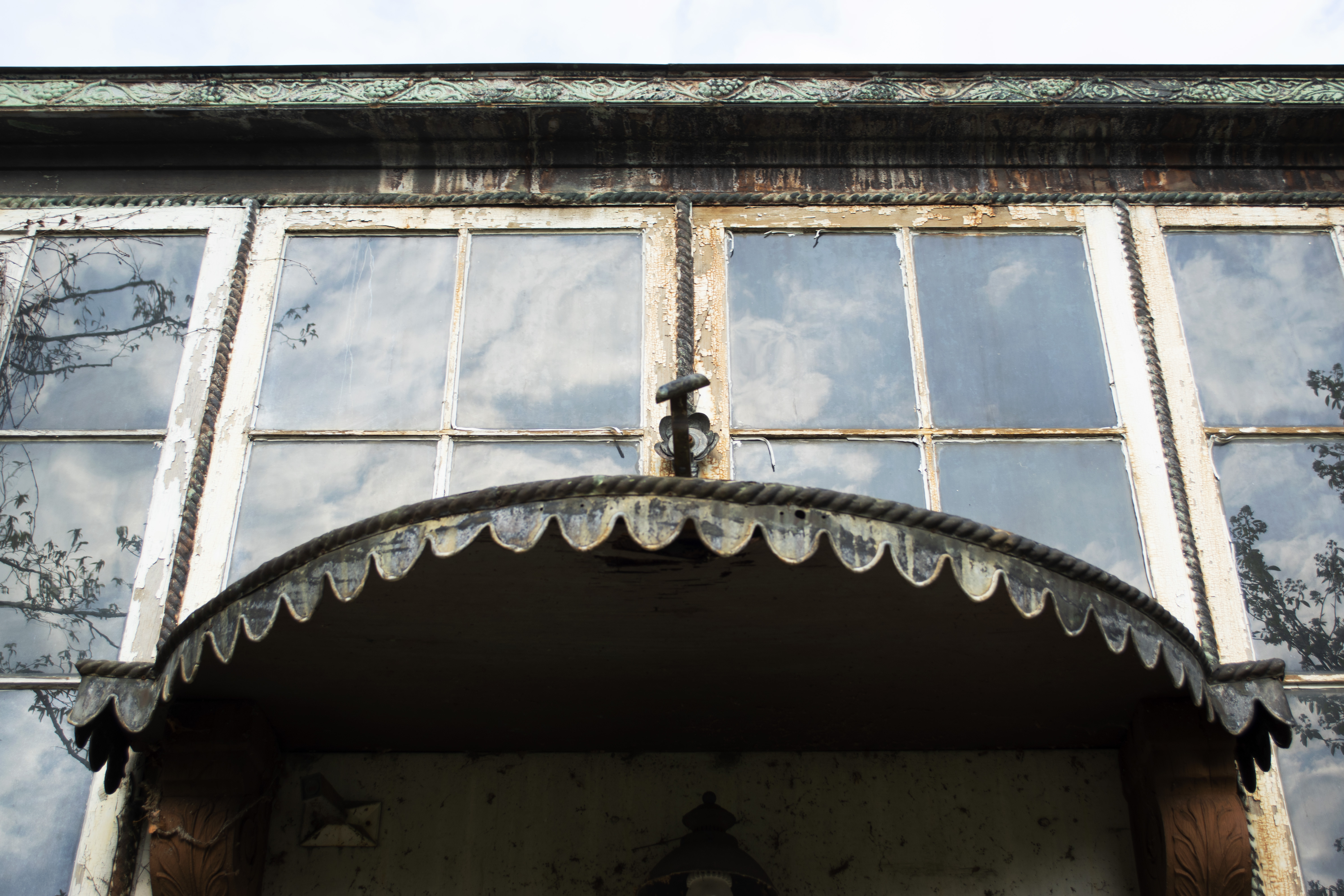
Canopy at an entrance to the conservatory

At the south end of the mansion, there is a large, glass-roofed conservatory with stone and glass walls. The conservatory has canopied entrances at both its east and west face. These entrances are flanked with large, square limestone piers adorned by iconic capitals. These piers are topped by stone statues depicting large bouquets of flowers, similar to the statue atop the main entrance.

To the west of the conservatory is a sizable coach house built in the same style as the main house.

Upon the house's completion, it received a design award from the Evanston Art Commission. It was the last house of its size to be constructed in Evanston prior to the Great Depression.

== History ==
=== Clarke family ===
Construction of the Harley Clarke Mansion, designed by architect Richard Powers, was completed in 1927 for Clarke, his wife, Hildur Freeman, and their two children, son John and daughter Hermena.

Harley Clarke was a wealthy utilities magnate who had, at one time, simultaneously served as the president and treasurer of five separate subsidiary light, power, and gas companies. He was a part of Chicago high society, having membership in the Union League Club of Chicago and the Chicago Athletic Club, and serving as a promoter for the Shakespeare repertory at the Civic Theater. In 1930, he became the president of Fox Film. Clarke's fortune has been estimated at upward of $60 million

The Clarke family owned the house until 1949, when they had to sell it due to significant financial losses during the Great Depression.

=== Sigma Chi ===
Sigma Chi purchased the mansion and used it as the fraternity's national headquarters from 1951 to 1965, when the city of Evanston purchased it.

=== Evanston Art Center ===
Starting in 1966, the Evanston Art Center leased the property until 2015. During the Evanston Art Center's occupancy of the mansion, the main-floor rooms were converted into exhibition galleries, and the second-floor bedrooms and third-floor ballroom were utilized as classroom space. The basement was also converted into a pottery studio featuring both electric and gas fired kilns, as well as a pottery wheel room, and glazing room. However the house's wood-paneled entry hall and library were retained.

=== Endangerment and preservation ===
In January 2008, Evanston City Council unanimously approved the Lakefront Master Plan as a "blueprint for future renovation projects along Evanston’s lakefront." The authors concluded that the Harley Clarke Mansion, then home to the Evanston Art Center should be fully restored.

In 2013, Evanston City Council rejected an offer from Jennifer Pritzker and her company, Tawani Enterprises, to renovate the Harley Clarke Mansion and convert it into a 57-room, boutique hotel. The company offered to purchase the property, including 2.5 acres of land for $1.2 million, and maintain public access to the beach. Opposition centered around the privatization of public land.

Later that year, the Illinois Department of Natural Resources began discussions with city council to purchase the Harley Clarke Mansion as "an office space and public coastal education center." The deal fell through in early 2015, following the election of a new governor in November 2014 and Evanston's preference for a lease versus the sale the state agency wanted. A state budget crisis also may have contributed.

In 2015 the mansion began to require "more maintenance than either the city or the art center was able to fund." A report commissioned by the city concluded in August 2016 that the mansion was mostly in 'serviceable condition', but still required expenditures on repairs.

In 2017 the city of Evanston issued a request for proposals from nonprofit organizations to lease the property and assume ongoing management and maintenance. One of the proposals received was from Evanston Lakehouse & Gardens (ELHG), a local nonprofit group focused on renovating the property into a "... fully renovated, multi-purpose venue for environmental education, community events and cultural programming." The city council voted 8-1 to approve the proposal from ELGH and instructed the city manager to negotiate a 40-year lease with the group.

After approximately six months of negotiations between the city and ELHG, city council members said they were concerned by the group's 10-year timeline to secure funding and by the city's potential liability—and voted the plan down. In June 2018, city council approved a resolution for the city manager to meet with Evanston Lighthouse Dunes, a privately funded group that offered to finance a project to raze the Harley Clarke Mansion and "restore the natural dunes, beach and parkland as part of a new public space." The city manager was authorized to enter into a memorandum of understanding with Evanston Lighthouse Dunes, fewer than 40 days later, in a 5-3 city council vote.

The vote by city council prompted an editorial from Blair Kamin, architecture critic for The Chicago Tribune: "What in the name of progressive politics is going on here? How can a left-leaning town that has shot down skyscraper proposals on the grounds that they would wipe out historic buildings be contemplating the destruction of an official city landmark?"

Following that, a volunteer group called Save Harley Clarke filed petitions with the Evanston city clerk to place a nonbinding resolution on the November 2018 ballot. On November 6, 2018 Evanston residents overwhelmingly voted in support of saving the Harley Clarke mansion from demolition.

In 2021 the Evanston City Council voted to enter into negotiations with Artists Book House, a literary and book arts non-profit organization, for a long-term lease of the Harley Clarke Mansion. The decision had been delayed due to the COVID-19 pandemic. In May 2021, Artists Book House was given the keys to the mansion and began the process of cleaning the house and assessing its current condition.

It was announced that the restored house would be home to print, paper and book binding studios, conference rooms and classrooms for teaching writing, and a papermaker’s garden. A café, art gallery and a bookstore would be open to the public. Additional public programming, such as artist talks, author readings and poetry slams, would be scheduled.

== Architectural and local significance ==
In 1928, the mansion won a design award from the Evanston Art Commission.

The Harley Clarke Mansion was declared an Evanston landmark in 1982.

The Harley Clarke Mansion has been described as "...a striking architectural presence." In their 2004 book, "North Shore Chicago: Houses of the Lakefront Suburbs, 1890-1940," Evanston-based architect Stuart Cohen and historic preservation consultant Susan Benjamin write: "It was the last house of its size to be built in Evanston before the 1929 stock market crash."

According to Bonnie McDonald, president and CEO of Landmarks Illinois, "...(S)ome might call (Jensen) the equivalent of Frank Lloyd Wright in returning to an indigenous landscape and a reference to the prairie. So think of him as one of the most revolutionary landscape architects of his time. We find it counterintuitive that there may be discussion of demolition by the city of its own landmark."

The second edition of "Evanston: 150 Years, 150 Places" describes the Harley Clarke Mansion as "...one of Evanston's most picturesque mansions. Within, the rooms were arranged to provide views all the way through the house in both directions. This provided a view of Lake Michigan from the front door."

In a 2017 article on the Bob Vila website, "15 100-Year-Old Houses That Haven't Aged a Day," the Harley Clarke Mansion is ranked No. 14: "While Harley Clarke Mansion has at various times in its history served as a private residence, a fraternity headquarters, and a venue for local arts, it has never lost its original elegance or intrigue. The ninety-year-old ... lakefront property ... has had such an enchanting effect on Evanstonians that the city recently decided to open its historic doors to the public again."
