= Jessie Gaynor =

American composer

Jesse L. Smith Gaynor
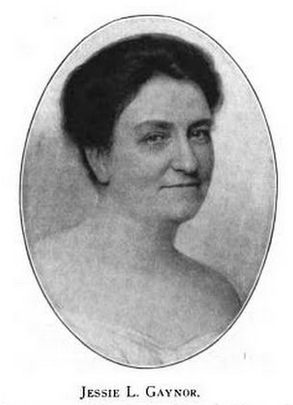
- Jessie L. Gaynor, from a 1915 publication.
- Born: February 17, 1863; St. Louis, Missouri
- Died: February 20, 1921 (aged 58); St. Louis, Missouri
- Occupation: Composer
- Children: Rose Gaynor Barrett (Rose Fenimore Gaynor)

Jesse L. Smith Gaynor (February 17, 1863 - February 20, 1921) was an American composer of children's music. She wrote the music for the well-known children's lullaby "The Slumber Boat", in collaboration with the children's author, Alice C.D. Riley, who wrote the lyrics.

Her daughter, Rose Gaynor Barrett (1884-1954), was an American visual artist as well as songwriter under her maiden name, Rose Fenimore Gaynor.

== Biography ==
Jessie L. Smith was born in St. Louis, Missouri to a prominent businessman of that city and Susan Fenimore Taylor, from whom she inherited her love and talent for music and who was related to James Fenimore Cooper. As a child, Mrs. Gaynor sang correctly before she could talk. She was early placed under instruction, first in instrumental and later in vocal music, and continued her musical studies while in school and college. Aside from her piano study she became somewhat familiar with the cornet, double bass, and violin, and later studied the violin for two years. While at school, she played these various instruments in an amateur orchestra.

She later studied piano and theory under Dr. Louis Maas of Boston. Afterward she studied voice under John Dennis Mehan, theory under A. J. Goodrich and Adolph Weidig, and piano under Leopold Godowsky.

After marrying, she and her husband, Thomas W. Gaynor of Iowa City, moved to St. Joseph, Missouri, where Mrs. Gaynor organized the Ladies' Fortnightly Musical Club and became an active musical influence in the community. In 1895, she went to Chicago, where for five years she was a well-known teacher of piano and harmony, and published there her first compositions, among them An Album of Seven Songs, Rose Songs, and Songs to the Little Folks, besides a number of single works, all of them favorably received. In 1900, she returned to St. Joseph and established a musical school known as The Gaynor Studios, which was very successful and constituted an art center, where drawing, painting, and other arts were taught in addition to the various branches of music. Her musical activities have extended to giving lecture-recitals of her songs, particularly for children, and talks on the musical training of children, for which she was in demand at musical clubs, state teachers' conventions, and other educational bodies. Composers June Weybright and Amy Aldrich Worth were among her students. She was a member of the Chicago Manuscript Society and of the Manuscript Society of New York.

Jessie Gaynor died in St. Louis on February 20, 1921.

== Selected publications ==
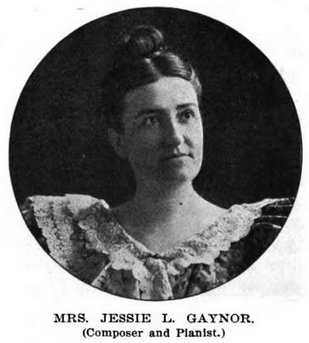
Jessie L. Gaynor, from an 1896 publication

Her Album of Seven Songs includes graceful renditions of popular pieces, such as "The Night Hath a Thousand Eyes," "Love's Coming," "Cradle Song," "If I Were a Bee," "Lullaby," "Sleep Song," and "And I."

The Album of Rose Songs contains "If I Knew", "My True Lover Gave Me a Red, Red Rose", "The Wind Went Wooing a Rose", "In my Garden", "My Valentine", and "Because She Kissed It".

Among the Songs to Little Folks are "The Rich Little Dolly"," Fireflies", "An Early Morning Pastoral", and "The Flower's Cradle Song".

Another volume of interest to every child is Mother Goose Songs from the operetta, The House that Jack Built, which Mrs. Gaynor wrote in collaboration with Mrs. Alice C. D. Riley.

Several recent publications are for the use of public schools, written with an educational objective. These include Lilts and Lyrics, written in collaboration with Mrs. Riley, who authored the lyrics of most of Mrs. Gaynor's songs; and The Elements of Musical Expression. Songs of the Child World, Nos. 1 and 2, are for an earlier grade, and have a wide use in kindergartens and the primary grades of schools.

Mrs. Gaynor has also published some works for piano, among those best known being two books for beginners: Miniature Melodies and First Pedal Studies. She has also written, in collaboration with Mrs. Riley and Frederic Fleming Beale, several successful operettas and cantatas, such as The House That Jack Built, The Toy Shop, The First Lieutenant, The Man with a Wart, and Harvest Time, Christmas Time, and Blossom Time. Elson says of her children's songs that in this juvenile vein she has no equal among American women, and that some of them may be readily used by "children of a larger growth." Mrs. Gaynor's reputation rests principally on her songs. In the attractive operettas her gift of melody and of rhythm is in evidence, and also the same instinct which unites the words and music of her songs into an artistic whole.
