= Fay Peck =

American artist (1931–2016)

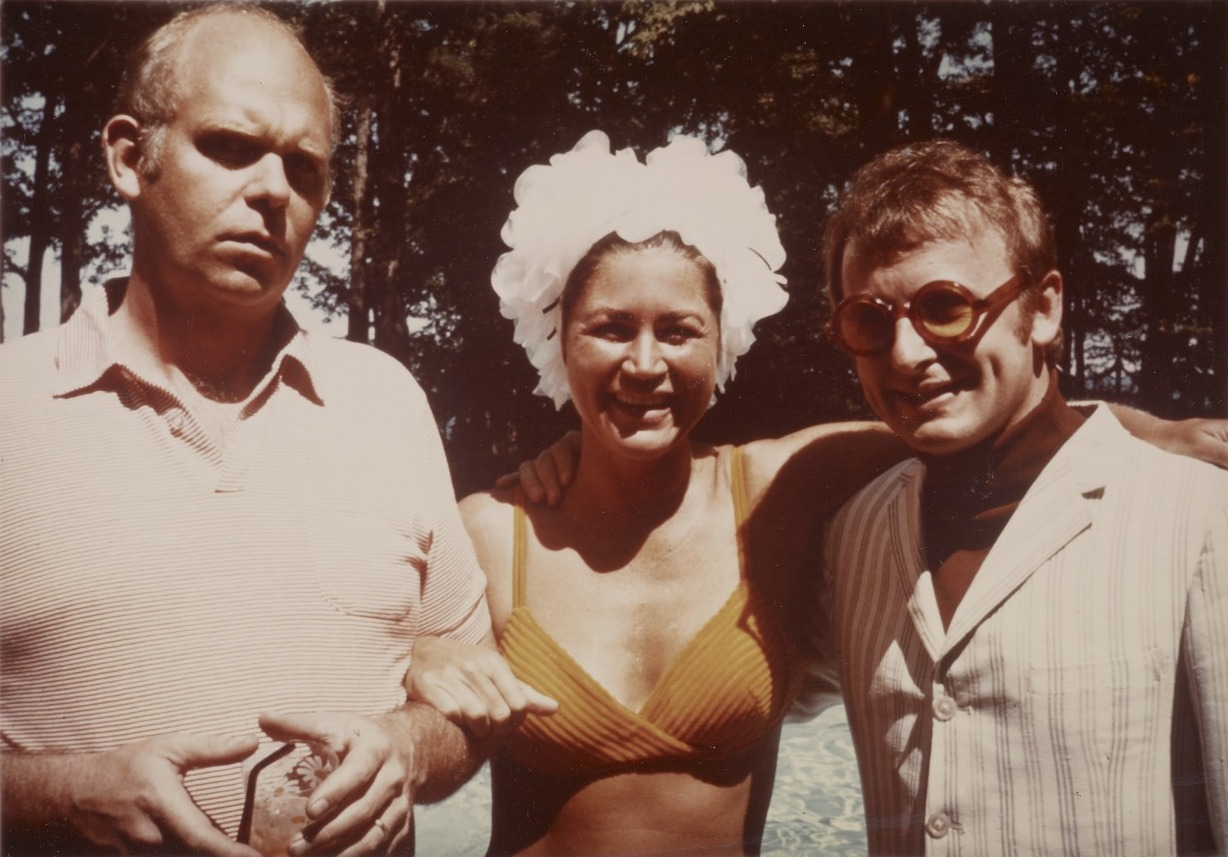
- Artists Claes Oldenburg, and Fay Peck, with museum director Jan van der Marck (August 1968)
- Born: Fay Gunderson; August 7, 1931. Chicago, Illinois, US
- Died: September 18, 2016 (aged 85); Bozeman, Montana, US
- Resting place: Lake Forest Cemetery, Lake Forest, Lake County, Illinois, US
- Movement: Expressionism
- Spouse: David Bell Peck III

Fay Peck (1931 – 2016) was an American Expressionist artist, known for her oil painting and printmaking.

== Biography ==
Fay Gunderson was born in Chicago, Illinois on August 7, 1931, to parents Alice Gunderson and Gunnar E. Gunderson. She was of Norwegian descent. She grew up in rural River Forest, Illinois. In 1954, she married David Bell Peck III on her family farm in Lemont.

She attended University of Miami, and studied in the summers at University of Wisconsin and the University of Oslo. She participated in art workshops and studied at Anderson Ranch Arts Center and Evanston Art Center, where she studied with artist Paul Wieghardt.

Her work is in many collections including Rice University; First National Bank of Chicago; the New York Stock Exchange; Goldman Sachs; and various United States embassies.

== Publications ==
- Peck, Fay (2014). Steele, Robin (ed.). Fay Peck: American Expressionist. History Works, Incorporated. ISBN 9780979776953.
