= Paul Wieghardt =

German-born American artist

- Born: 1897; Lüdenscheid, North Rhine-Westphalia, Germany
- Died: 1969; Wilmette, Illinois, US
- Education: Kölner Werkschulen, Bauhaus
- Alma mater: Dresden Academy of Fine Arts
- Known for: painting, teaching

Paul Wieghardt (1897–1969) was a German-born American artist and professor, he is known for his paintings. He taught at the School of the Art Institute of Chicago and Illinois Institute of Technology (IIT).

== Early life and education ==
Paul Wieghardt was born 1897 in Lüdenscheid, Kingdom of Prussia in the German Empire. His father had a painting business where he apprenticed when he was young. During World War I he served in the military.

He attended school at the Cologne Academy of Fine and Applied Arts (also known as Kölner Werkschulen) starting in 1920, where he studied architecture with Martin Elsaesser and Robert Seuffert. At the advice of his teachers he decided to switch to fine arts. In 1923, he attended one semester at Bauhaus in Weimar, where he studied with Paul Klee, Wassily Kandinsky, László Moholy-Nagy, Lyonel Feininger, and Oskar Schlemmer. From 1925 until 1931, he attended Dresden Academy of Fine Arts, where he graduated with a degree. At Dresden Academy of Fine Arts he studied with Robert Sterl.

== Career ==
After graduation in 1931, Weighardt moved to Paris and married Nelli Bar, an artist he met when he studied in Cologne. They lived in Paris, Portugal and Norway until World War II broke out. Bar was Jewish and they decided to emigrate to the United States.

In 1946, Wieghardt was appointed professor of figurative painting at the School of the Art Institute of Chicago. In 1950, he started teaching in the architecture department at the Illinois Institute of Technology (IIT) by invitation of Mies van der Rohe. He also taught at the Evanston Art Center.

His students included Robert Indiana, Fay Peck, Claes Oldenburg, Leon Golub, H. C. Westermann, Richard Hunt, Irving Petlin, Arthur Okamura, Marion Lerner-Levine, Mary Gehr, among others.

== Death and legacy ==
In 1969, Wieghardt died in Wilmette, Illinois. In 1981, his widow Nelli Bar–Wieghardt donated a large part of his estate in his hometown of Lüdenscheid, which is now the Wieghardt Foundation.

His work is in various museum collections including the Smithsonian American Art Museum, the Smart Museum of Art, Albright-Knox Art Gallery, Fine Arts Museums of San Francisco, as well as others.
