= Marie Guiraud =

French-American pioneer and rancher

- Born: Marie Antoinette Chabreat; October 31, 1832; Gard, France
- Died: June 5, 1909 (aged 76); Garo, Colorado
- Occupations: Businesswoman, rancher, land developer
- Known for: Being a successful rancher and founder of Garo, Colorado

Marie Antoinette Guiraud (October 31, 1832–June 5, 1909) was a French-American pioneer and rancher in Colorado Territory. Born in Gard departement in France, Marie Antoinette Chabreat married Adolphe Guiraud in 1848 and set sail for New Orleans, Louisiana, one year later.

After living in Ohio and Kansas, the Guirauds settled in Colorado Territory, where they homesteaded land for their farm and ranch at the beginning of the 1860s. After her husband's death, she expanded their 640-acre ranch to 5,000 acres.

Adolphe Guiraud died in 1875, and Guiraud successfully managed the hay farm and ranch. In 1879, she had a town called Garo, platted and bought and sold land for the town. After the Colorado Midland Railway established a station at Garo, the town grew to include stores, businesses, a church, a school, and an opera house. Also in 1879, Guiraud filed a water rights suit, which became a landmark case, establishing her "right of prior approbation" of the water.

== Life in France ==
Marie Antoinette Chabreat was born in the Gard departement in Southern France on October 31, 1830. Little is known about her early years besides being born on a farm. On March 28, 1848, she married Adolphe Guiraud, age 26, from Leon, France. His family members were wine merchants. Adolphe's brother immigrated to New Orleans, Louisiana, and became a successful merchant. In December 1849, Guiraud and her husband set sail for an eight-week voyage to New Orleans on the ship Adair.

== Early years in America ==
Guiraud gave birth to their son on March 28, 1850, in New Orleans or in 1850 in France. After a month, the Guirauds traveled to Cincinnati, Ohio, where Adolphe engaged in several occupations. He was first a wine dealer, but his building burned down. Adolphe then ran a farm followed by a bakery.

The couple each began a business in Leavenworth, Kansas, but Guiraud had to shut down her coffee shop due to ill health. Adolphe made plans with Frank Maywell to start a business in the Colorado Territory to capitalize on influx of people to Colorado during the Pike's Peak Gold Rush. Adolphe and Maywell, his partner, opened a mercantile business in Hamilton at Tarryall Creek. (Note: There is another town of Hamilton, Colorado in Moffat County.) About 1862, Adolphe ended the partnership. While Adolphe was in Colorado Territory, Guiraud stayed behind in Kansas where she raised three sons and in 1861 she gave birth to a daughter.

== Rancher and farmer ==
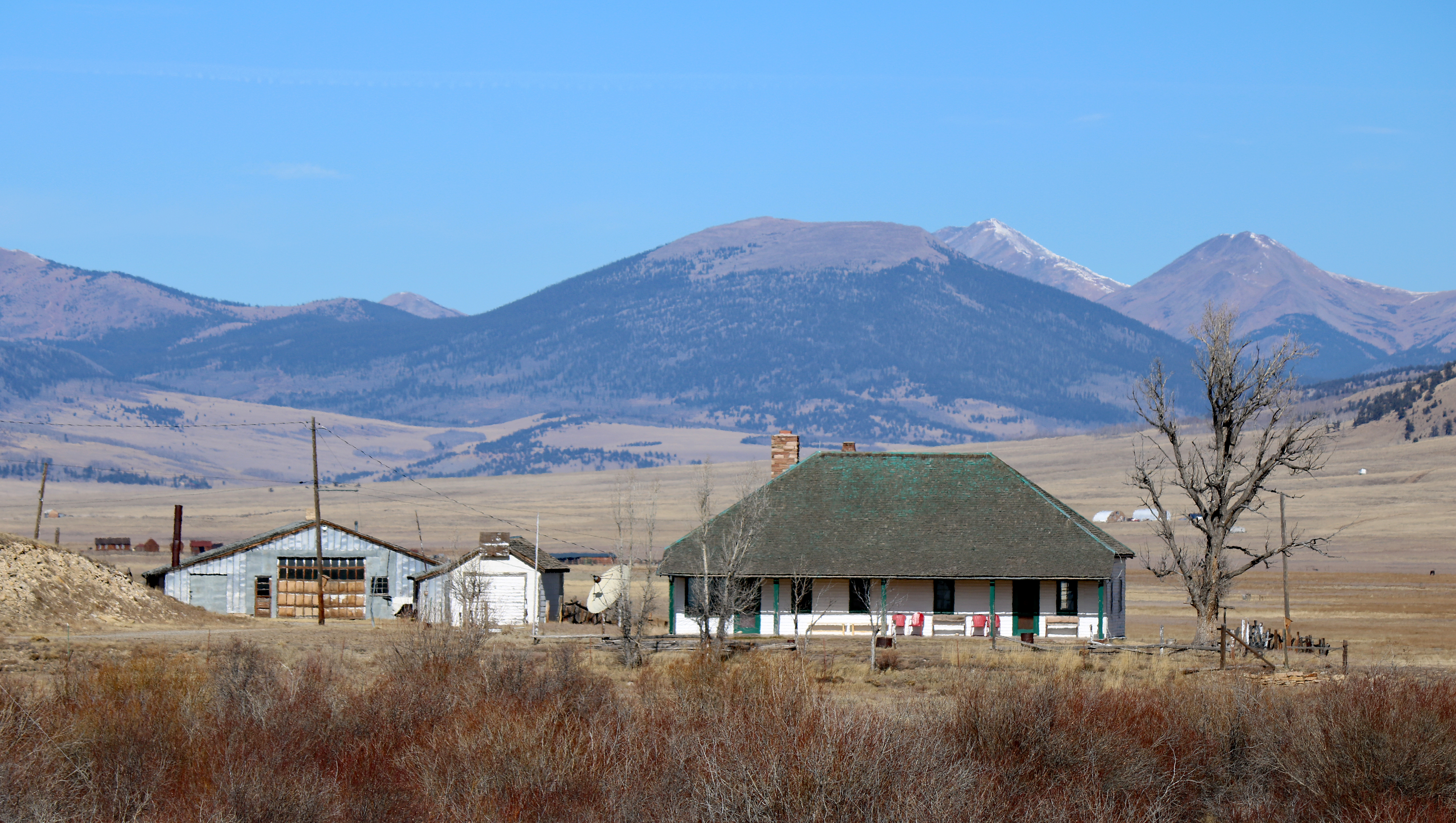
The Guiraud-McDowell Ranch, located in Garo, Colorado, is now called the Buffalo Peaks Ranch. The property is listed on the National Register of Historic Places

The following year, Adolphe picked up his family, and moved to Colorado Territory. The family homesteaded a 160-acre parcel in Park County, Colorado at what became the town of Garo, (Note: Guiraud's obituary states that she came to Colorado in 1860.) The ranch was near Trout Creek and the South Fork of the South Platte River. which was named after Marie and Adolphe Guiraud. They operated a ranch and a farm, cultivating oats, wheat, and vegetables.

After their son, Henry Eugene, died accidentally at the age of ten, the family moved to Denver, and the couple ran a meat market for a year. They then returned to their homestead claim with a baby girl born in 1865. Guiraud had more children, for a total of ten offspring by 1873.

The Guirauds opened a meat market in Fairplay to sell their meat, or a grocery store, but he closed the business after the many people he gave credit to did not pay their bills. Successful farmers and ranchers, the Guirauds expanded their ranch to 640-acres and in 1867, they built the Guiraud Ditch to irrigate their farmland.

Adolphe died in October 1875, and was interred at the Fairplay cemetery. Guiraud raised their surviving seven children, ranging in age from 2 to 25 years. She became a wealthy livestock rancher, having the area's largest sheep herd. She sold cattle and horses and hay. She expanded the ranch to 5,000 acres valued at $200,000 (equivalent to $7,166,667 in 2025). Her sons worked her ranch or established their ranches.

By 1879, new settlers diverted water from Trout Creek, reducing what was available to Guiraud's farm. Guiraud filed suit against the neighbors, becoming a landmark Colorado water rights case. Guiraud established that her family had used the water since they settled the land, and due to the "right of prior approbation", she won the case after several years at court.

== Real estate dealer ==
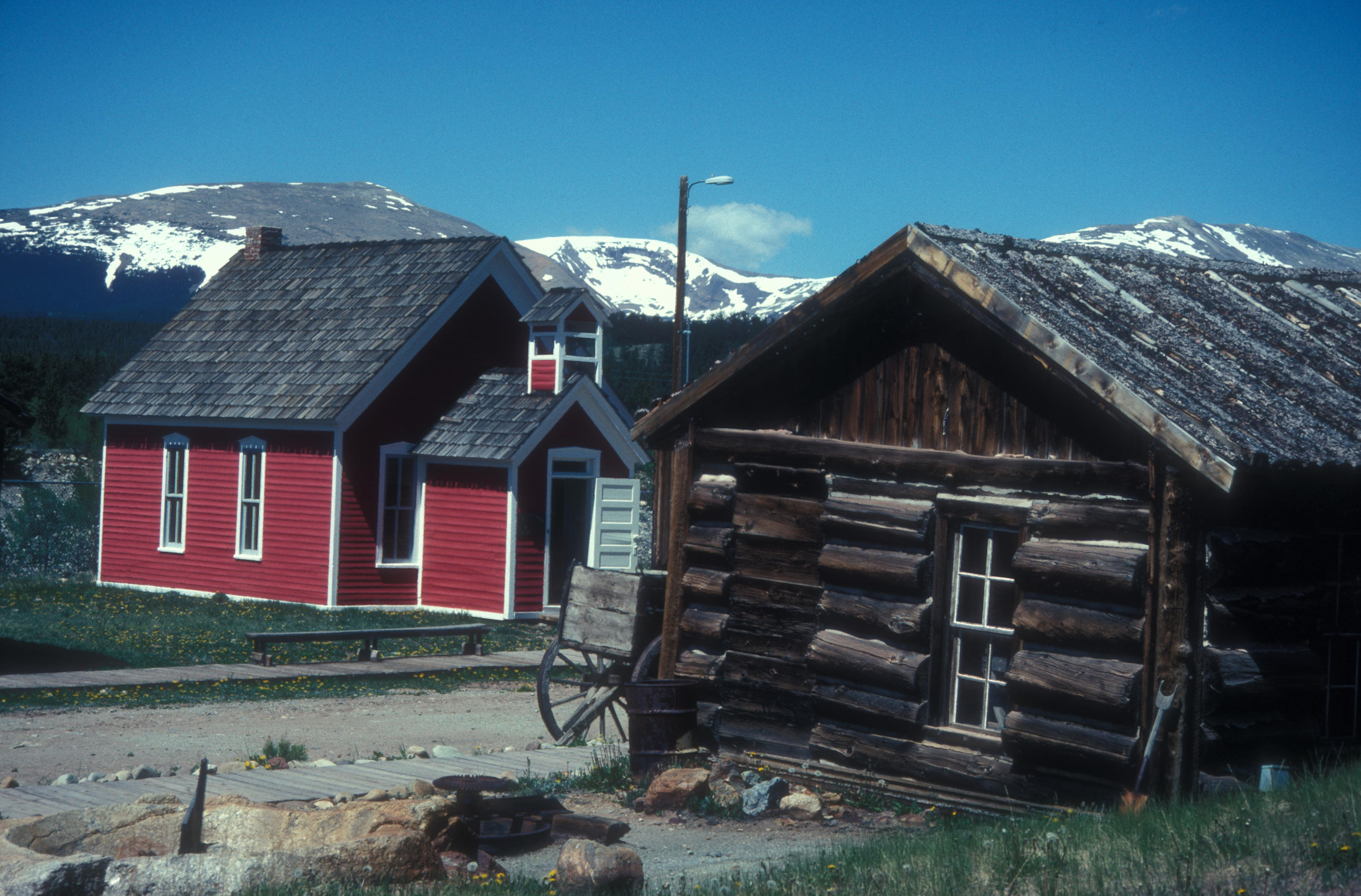
1879 Garo Schoolhouse, the original school at Garo, located nine miles east of Fairplay

As railroad service extended into Colorado, Guiraud planned to establish a town, believing that a railroad would come to the area. She hired civil engineer Fred Morse to plat the town of Garo, after her husband, using the English pronunciation of their surname. She acquired, sold, and leased land, and the town grew after the Colorado Midland Railway established a station at Garo. The railway also transported livestock and hay to Denver. At its height, the town had a school, mercantile, church, hotel, saloons, sawmill, livery, blacksmith, and an opera house.

== Later years and death ==
In 1906, her large house was completely razed by fire, reportedly by sparks from a Colorado and Southern Railroad train. She had a new house built that was a "fine, ten-room, one-story building.

Guiraud died on June 5, 1909 (Note: The date of death is based upon a June 6, 1909 newspaper announcement of her death. There is another source that reported that she died one week later on June 12, 1909) at her home in Garo, Colorado and is buried with her husband at the Fairplay cemetery. Five of her ten children were alive at the time of her death. After her death, $80,000 (equivalent to $2,866,667 in 2025) in gold was reported to have been stored in her cellar.

== Bibliography ==
- Bjorklund, Linda (2010). Blevins, Tim; Dennis Daily; Chris Nicholl; Calvin P. Otto; Katherine Scott Sturdevant (eds.). Extraordinary women of the Rocky Mountain West. Colorado Springs, Colorado: Pikes Peak Library District, with the Colorado Women's Hall of Fame. ISBN 978-1-56735-255-9.
- Dusen, Laura Van (2013). "Chapter 1 Marie Guiraud". Historic Tales from Park County: Parked in the Past. Arcadia Publishing. ISBN 978-1-62584-616-7.
