= 1831 Nicholson =

Stony main-belt asteroid

Discovery
- Discovered by: P. Wild
- Discovery site: Zimmerwald Obs.
- Discovery date: 17 April 1968

Designations
- Named after: Seth B. Nicholson (American astronomer)
- Alternative designations: 1968 HC · 1948 GF; 1955 ML
- Minor planet category: main-belt · (inner); Baptistina · Flora

Orbital characteristics
- Epoch 27 April 2019 (JD 2458600.5)
- Uncertainty parameter 0
- Observation arc: 62.92 yr (22,982 d)
- Aphelion: 2.5257 AU
- Perihelion: 1.9527 AU
- Semi-major axis: 2.2392 AU
- Eccentricity: 0.1279
- Orbital period (sidereal): 3.35 yr (1,224 d)
- Mean anomaly: 36.790°
- Mean motion: 0° 17^{m} 38.76^{s} / day
- Inclination: 5.6335°
- Longitude of ascending node: 72.604°
- Argument of perihelion: 183.46°

Physical characteristics
- Mean diameter: 7.10±1.29 km 8.08±0.47 km
- Synodic rotation period: 3.228±0.001 h
- Geometric albedo: 0.296; 0.39
- Spectral type: SMASS = S
- Absolute magnitude (H): 12.40; 12.5; 12.70

1831 Nicholson, provisional designation 1968 HC, is a stony asteroid of the Baptistina family from the inner regions of the asteroid belt, approximately 8 kilometers (5 miles) in diameter. It was discovered on 17 April 1968, by Swiss astronomer Paul Wild at the Zimmerwald Observatory near Bern, Switzerland. The S-type asteroid has a rotation period of 3.2 hours. It was named for American astronomer Seth B. Nicholson.

== Orbit and classification ==
According to a HCM-analysis by David Nesvorný, Nicholson is a member of the Baptistina family (403), located within the greater Flora family a giant asteroid clan and the largest family of stony asteroids in the asteroid belt. Conversely, and since the existence of a proper Flora family has been ruled out by other astronomers, Nicholson has also been classified as a background asteroid.

It orbits the Sun in the inner main-belt at a distance of 2.0–2.5 AU once every 3 years and 4 months (1,224 days; semi-major axis of 2.24 AU). Its orbit has an eccentricity of 0.13 and an inclination of 6° with respect to the ecliptic. The asteroid was first observed as 1948 GF at the Nice Observatory in April 1948. The body's observation arc begins with its observation as 1955 ML at the Goethe Link Observatory in June 1955, almost 13 years prior to its official discovery observation at Zimmerwald.

== Physical characteristics ==
In the SMASS classification, Nicholson is a common stony S-type asteroid.

=== Rotation period ===
In April 2015, a rotational lightcurve of Nicholson was obtained from photometric observations by a group of Spanish astronomers from Valencia and Alicante at various observatories: (J08), (Z95), (J67), (Z98) and (I57). Lightcurve analysis gave a well-defined rotation period of 3.228±0.001 hours and a brightness variation of 0.24 magnitude (U=3). At the same time, Serbian astronomer Vladimir Benishek at the Belgrade Observatory determined a concurring period of 3.25510±0.00003 hours with an amplitude of 0.29 magnitude (U=3).

=== Diameter and albedo ===
According to the survey carried out by the NEOWISE mission of NASA's Wide-field Infrared Survey Explorer, Nicholson measures 7.1 or 8.1 kilometers in diameter and its surface has an albedo of 0.39 and 0.296, respectively. The Collaborative Asteroid Lightcurve Link assumes an albedo of 0.24 – derived from 8 Flora, the namesake of the Flora family – and calculates a diameter of 8.58 kilometers based on an absolute magnitude of 12.5.

== Naming ==
This minor planet was named by the discoverer in memory of American astronomer Seth B. Nicholson (1891–1963), who pioneered in several branches of planetary research at Mount Wilson Observatory and who discovered four of Jupiter's numerous moons – namely, Sinope, Lysithea, Carme, and Ananke. The lunar crater Nicholson and the dark terrain of Nicholson Regio on Jupiter's moon Ganymede, as well as the impact crater Nicholson on Mars have also been named after him. The official naming citation was published by the Minor Planet Center on 15 October 1977 (M.P.C. 4236).
