= Amy Aldrich Worth =

American composer, choir director, and organist

Amy E. Aldrich Worth (January 18, 1888 – April 29, 1967) was an American composer, choir director, and organist who was born in St. Joseph, Missouri.

== Career ==
Worth studied music with Jessie Gaynor, Frederick Beale, Mary Lyon and Arthur Garbett, and married Harry Worth on July 1, 1915. She taught piano and worked as an organist and choir director in St. Joseph. Later, she directed the Women's Chorus of the Women's University Club in Seattle, Washington, and was a member of the Seattle Society of Composers. In 1955, she served as the Sigma Alpha Iota National Chair of American Music. Her compositions include:

== Piano ==
- Gavotte Marianne
- Purple Heather (two pianos)

== Vocal ==
- Christ Rises (choir)
- Evening is Hushed
- He Came All so Still (choir)
- Israel
- Little Lamb
- Madrigal
- Mary, the Mother (Christmas cantata; choir)
- Midsummer
- Pierrot (words by Sara Teasdale)
- Sing of Christmas (women's choir)
- Song of Spring
- Song of the Angels
- Time of Violets
