= Jim Lentz =

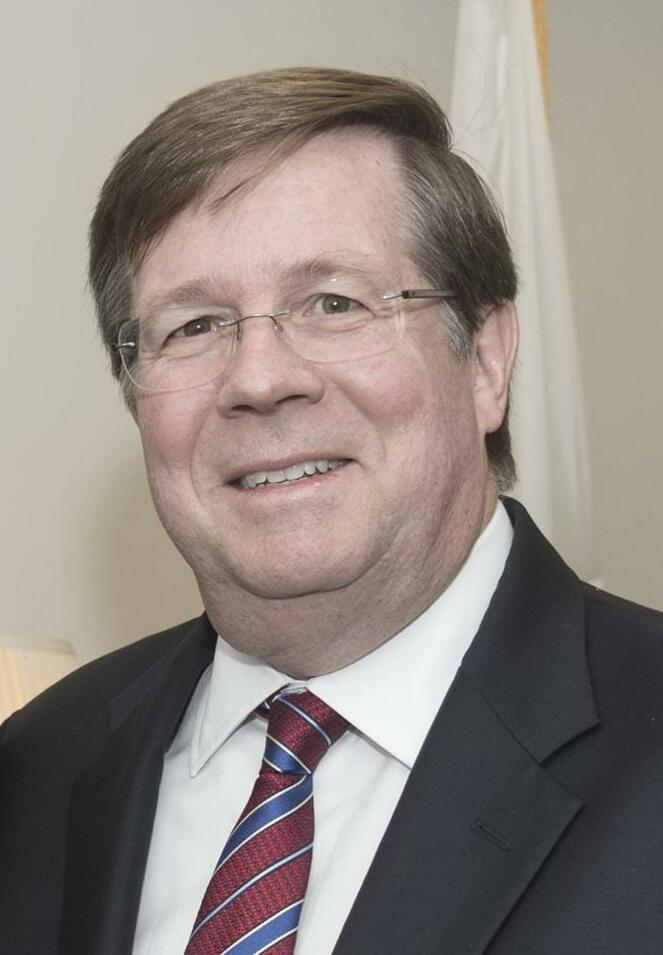
Lentz in 2017

James E. Lentz is an American business executive, and former chief executive officer for Toyota North America; president and chief operating officer of Toyota Motor North America, Inc. (TMA); and a senior managing officer of the parent company Toyota Motor Corporation (TMC) which is located in Japan.

== Toyota ==
Lentz began his career at Toyota in 1982 as a Merchandising Manager. In his capacity today, Lentz manages all of Toyota’s North American affiliate companies which include TMA, Toyota Motor Sales, U.S.A., Inc. (TMS), and Toyota Motor Engineering & Manufacturing, North America, Inc. (TEMA), which includes responsibilities for Toyota Motor Manufacturing Canada Inc. (TMMC), and oversight for Toyota Canada, Inc. (TCI). Lentz also serves as the chairman of the North American Executive Committee. This is composed of the top leaders from the affiliate companies. Most recently Lentz was the president and chief executive officer of TMS and senior vice president of TMA and served in a global advisory capacity as the managing officer for TMC. Before that he served as president and chief operating officer and executive vice president of TMS. Under Lentz leadership, he has moved and consolidated all of Toyota's North American operations from sites in California, New York and Kentucky to Texas.

Lentz previously held several executive positions including Toyota division group vice president and general manager where he oversaw all sales, logistics and marketing activities for Toyota and Scion regional sales offices and distributors. He also served as the group vice president of marketing for the Toyota division and vice president of Scion, and was responsible for the initial launch of a new line of vehicles. Lentz spent several years in the field as vice president and general manager of the Los Angeles region and before that general manager of the San Francisco region. Prior to his role as general manager Lentz was vice president of marketing services for CAT in Maryland. He has also held several other TMS positions, including field training manager, sales administration manager and truck sales team member.

Lentz serves as chairman on the board of directors of The Global Automakers.

On December 11, 2019, Toyota announced that Lentz would retire on April 1, 2020, and would be replaced by Tetsuo Ogawa, the current chief operating officer of Toyota North America.

== Early life and education ==
Lentz was raised at Glen Ellyn, Illinois. He earned both his undergraduate and graduate degrees from University of Denver (DU) and its Daniels College of Business. Lentz also serves as a member of the executive advisory board for Daniels College. Before Lentz joined Toyota as the merchandising manager for its Portland, Oregon region, he worked with Ford. He would later become the distribution manager and field operations manager. Lentz family originates in Germany.

== Recognition ==
He was named “Marketer of the Year” by Advertising Age in 2006, an Automotive News “All Star” in 2007 and honored at Industry Leader of the year.

== See also ==
- List of University of Denver alumni
