= Harry Mintz =

Polish-American painter

Harry S. Mintz (September 27, 1904 – September 15, 2002) was a Polish-American painter active in Chicago and Los Angeles.

== Biography ==
Mintz was born in Ostrowiec, (Note: There are several places in Poland called Ostrowiec, and it is unclear which one was Mintz's birthplace. Additionally his documented year of birth varies.) Poland and his documented year of birth varies as 1904, 1907 and 1909. He graduated from the Academy of Fine Arts in Warsaw in 1927 with a Master of Fine Arts degree. After a fellowship in Brazil, he immigrated to the United States in 1934, where he spent the majority of his professional years painting in the Chicago and Los Angeles areas. During World War II, he had lost his mother, father, and sisters in the Holocaust.

He was a visiting professor at Washington University in St. Louis in 1954–1955 and professor of painting at the School of the Art Institute of Chicago (SAIC) from 1956 to 1969 before he retiring from teaching to dedicate his time exclusively to painting. Mintz also taught at many Chicago area arts institutions, including the Evanston Art Center and the North Shore Art League.

Mintz was a registered Illinois artist for the Works Progress Administration Federal Art Project during the 1930s. His artwork, realistic in the beginning, grew more and more abstract as his career progressed, reflecting the uncertainties of life between the two world wars. His Self-Portrait, painted in 1931, shows the artist in his early twenties, wearing a shirt and tie under his artist smock, and posed against a background of books as if to emphasize the artist as both a worker and an educated, thinking man.

Mintz was an active member in Chicago's Jewish community. He sought out surviving members of his extended family during the postwar years, advertising in European newspapers and perusing thousands of telephone book pages. In 1987, he gathered the surviving members of the Mintz family for a family reunion in Chicago.

He died in his home in Lake View neighborhood of Chicago on September 15, 2002.

His work is included in public museum collections including the Princeton University Art Museum, Art Institute of Chicago, Brooklyn Museum, among others.
