= David Pion-Berlin =

American political scientist

- Occupations: Political scientist, academic, author and scholar.

Academic background
- Education: Colgate University; University of Denver
- Academic advisors: James Caporaso and John McCamant

David Pion-Berlin is an American political scientist, academic, author and scholar. He is a Distinguished Professor of Political Science at the University of California, Riverside. He is a Latin Americanist widely known for his research and writings on political repression, civil-military relations, defense, and security.

Pion-Berlin's work is focused on the area of Latin American politics, civil-military relations, security and defense, political violence, and human rights. In the area of International Relations, his work has dealt with the topics of regional security and international influences on Latin America. He has written over 100 articles, reviews, and books, including Soldiers, Politicians, and Civilians: Reforming Civil-Military Relations in Latin America (2017), which earned two best book awards in 2019, and Military Missions in Democratic Latin America (2016).

Pion-Berlin is the recipient of the 2019 Alfred Stepan Lifetime Achievement Award in Defense, Public Security and Democracy by the Latin American Studies Association, for his contributions to the study of civil-military relations. In recognition for his pedagogical work, he received the University of California, Riverside Dissertation Mentoring Award in 2016. He is a Fulbright Scholar and has received grants from the National Science Foundation, The American Philosophical Society, and the Ford Foundation.

== Education ==
Pion-Berlin received a B.A. from Colgate University in 1974 followed by an M.A. from University of Denver in 1981. He then received his Ph.D. at the Graduate School of International Studies, the University of Denver in 1984.

== Career ==
In 1985, Pion-Berlin joined Ohio State University as an assistant professor in the Department of Political Science. In 1991, he left The Ohio State University and joined the University of California at Riverside as an associate professor, becoming full professor in 1997. In 2021 he became a distinguished professor.

He is an associate editor of Armed Forces & Society.

== Research and writing ==
=== Political repression ===
At the beginning of his career, Pion-Berlin's research dealt with the question: why do governments resort to the most severe forms of intimidation and punishment of political opponents when other forms of political control may suffice? Departing from convention that state violence is usually a proportional, tit for tat response to societal violence, he focused on the doctrines and perceptions that guided the military's disproportionate and excessive attacks on its opponents. Threat perceptions, he discovered, were not grounded in objective appraisals of the opposition but rather in skewed preconceptions that derived from security doctrines popular among military regimes during the Cold War era.

=== Civil-military relations ===
Following that, Pion-Berlin's research turned to the theme of civil-military relations. As a Fulbright scholar, he conducted numerous and extensive field trips to Argentina, Chile, and Uruguay, including interviews with leading political and military figures. Based on his findings, he developed new analytical approaches to the study of how governments and their militaries interact. He found that, in order to know whether politicians or soldiers will prevail when they conflict over policy, one needs to know the characteristics of the agencies that have policy jurisdiction, and whether they create more formidable obstacles for one side than the other. Thus, a key and original finding of his book Through Corridors of Power: Institutions and Civil-Military Relations in Argentina, was that as the design of state institutions differed, so too did the civil-military balance of power.

During this period, an important, related topic of research included the nature of military autonomy. His work on this subject has influenced other scholars in coming to realize that military power is neither uniform nor absolute: the armed forces exert greater control over internal, organizational issues and less control over ostensibly political issues, each with different impacts on civilian control.

His edited volume, Civil-Military Relations in Latin America: New Analytical Perspectives brought together work by leading scholars of the armed forces. The book bridged the divide that often separated Latin Americanists from others in the discipline by having contributors adapt some theoretical approaches within the political science literature to the issue of civilian control over the armed forces.

Pion-Berlin's thematic emphasis then turned to an assortment of civil-military topics: defense organization, informal civil-military interactions, military responses to civilian uprisings, deficits in civilian attention to defense topics, and military missions. These resulted in numerous articles and chapters. His book, Military Missions in Democratic Latin America, culminated a long-term research project on whether the armed forces could be usefully deployed in domestic, non-traditional missions, both lethal and non-lethal. He found that when tasked with missions that draw on pre-existing organizational strengths, Latin American militaries can sometimes be utilized in appropriate and humane ways. As conservative institutions resistant to change, they are at a disadvantage when forced to reinvent themselves. This was the first book written in any language that analyzed Latin American military missions cross-nationally.

Later in his career, Pion-Berlin refocused attention on the three-sided nature of civil-military relations: soldiers, politicians, and civilians within society. In the book Soldiers, Politicians and Civilians: Reforming Civil-Military Relations in Democratic Latin America, he and his co-author, Rafael Martínez, devised a novel framework and measurement tools to assess what progress if any had been made in improving civil-military relations in four Latin American countries.

Pion-Berlin's most recent research has focused on three themes. The first is the role of the defense ministry in asserting greater civilian control and military effectiveness. Pion-Berlin and his associates have been exploring the reasons why some well-developed democracies have failed to adequately build up their defense ministries. The second research theme has to do with the deployment of the armed forces in Latin America for internal public security missions, and how governments and the military try to balance concerns with civilian control and human rights. The third is to assess the impact of the military's participation in the campaigns to fight the covid-19 pandemic.

== Awards and honors ==
- 1984-1985 -Western Political Science Association Award for Best Doctoral Dissertation in Region
- 1985 - Gabriel A. Almond Award for Best Doctoral Dissertation in Comparative Politics, American Political Science Association,
- 1994 - 1995 - American Republics Research Program Award, Fulbright
- 2003 - Best Paper Award, Conference, Research and Education in Defense and Security Studies
- 2016 - University of California, Riverside Dissertation Mentor Award
- 2018 - Giueseppe Caforio ERGOMAS (European Research Group on Military and Society) Award for Best Book of 2017-18
- 2019 - Award for the best book of the year, Asociación Española de Ciencia Política y de Administración
- 2019 - Alfred Stepan Lifetime Achievement Award in Defense, Public Security and Democracy, Latin American Studies Association

== Books ==
- Soldiers, Politicians, and Civilians: Reforming Civil-Military Relations in Democratic Latin America (co-authored with Rafael Martínez). New York: Cambridge University Press, 2017.
- Military Missions in Democratic Latin America. New York: Palgrave Macmillan 2016. In paperback, 2018.
- Organización de la defensa y control civil de las Fuerzas Armadas en América Latina. Buenos Aires: Ediciones Jorge Baudino, 2013 (co-edited with José Manuel Ugarte)
- Broken Promises? The Argentine Crisis and Argentine Democracy. Lanham, MD: Lexington Books, 2008 (co-edited with Edward C. Epstein).
- Transforming Latin America: The International and Domestic Origins of Change. Pittsburgh: University of Pittsburgh Press, 2005 (co-authored with Craig Arceneaux).
- Civil-Military Relations in Latin America: New Analytical Perspectives. Chapel Hill: University of North Carolina Press, 2001.
- Through Corridors of Power: Institutions and Civil-Military Relations in Argentina. University Park, PA: Penn State University Press, 1997.
- Democracia y Cuestión Militar. Buenos Aires: Universidad Nacional de Quilmes, 1996 (co-authored with Ernesto López).
- The Ideology of State Terror: Economic Doctrine and Political Repression in Argentina and Peru. Boulder: Lynne Rienner Publishers, 1989.
