= Maud Wilde =

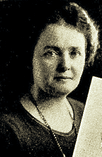
Photo from Women of the West (1928)

signature

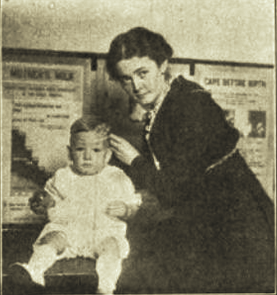
Wilde at work at Mothers' Educational Center (1917)

Maud Wilde (née, Shaw; 1880–1965) was an American pediatrician and author. She founded the Mothers' Educational Center in Los Angeles, California.

== Early life and education ==
Lulu Maud (or Maude) Shaw was born in Gilmore Township, Greene County, Pennsylvania, 1880. Her parents were Sylvester Irving Shaw and Roza (Neely) Shaw. At the age of six months, the family relocated to Durango, Colorado.

She attended the schools of Durango, and then studied medicine and oral surgery at the University of Denver.

== Career ==
She moved to Mercur, Utah after graduation, where she married Thomas Bancroft Wilde (1865–1925), mayor of the city. Their children were Dorothy and Thomas B. After relocating to Philadelphia for five years, she studied psychology, obstetrics. and pediatrics.

In approximately 1912, she came to California. The following year, she became the chair of the Public Health department for the Los Angeles District Federation of Women's Clubs. In 1916, she founded Mothers' Educational Center in Los Angeles, California. She was the author of The Business of Being a Mother and The Story of Life. Wilde was a member of the Woman's City Club and the University Book Club.

== Death ==
Maud Wilde made her home in Los Angeles, where she died on November 12, 1965.

== Selected works ==
- The Story of Life, 1924 (text)
- The Business of Being a Mother, 1926 (text)
