= Myrtle L. Richmond =

American researcher

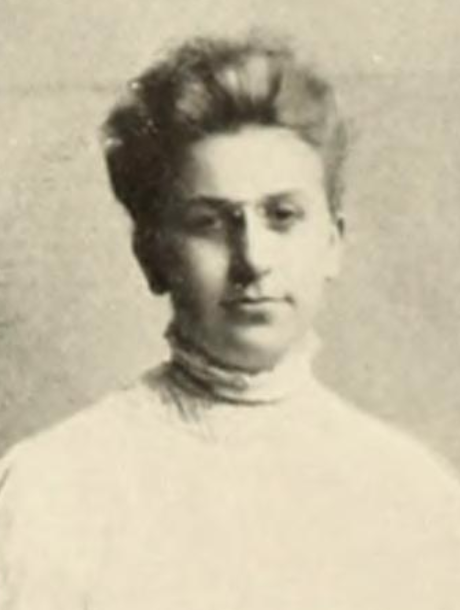
- Myrtle L. Richmond, from the 1907 Smith College yearbook
- Born: Myrtle Leila Richmond; September 30, 1882; Vinland, Kansas
- Died: January 2, 1973 (aged 90); Pasadena, California
- Education: Smith College (BA); University of Denver (AM)
- Known for: Computer at Mount Wilson Observatory, 1913 to 1947
- Scientific career
- Fields: Mathematics and Astronomy
- Workplaces: Chamberlin Observatory; Goodsell Observatory; Mount Wilson Observatory

Myrtle Leila Richmond (September 30, 1882 – January 2, 1973) was an American astronomical researcher, a computer who worked at the Mount Wilson Observatory from 1913 to 1947.

== Early life and education ==
Richmond was born in Vinland, Kansas, the daughter of Frank L. Richmond and Leila Delight Richmond. Her father was construction superintendent in the railroad industry. She graduated from Smith College in 1907, and earned a master's degree in 1908 at the University of Denver. She was active in Smith College alumnae activities in Los Angeles.

== Career ==
Richmond taught mathematics at the University of Denver, and worked at Chamberlin Observatory in Colorado in 1909. She was a fellow in mathematics and astronomy at Goodsell Observatory in 1912, where she worked on Variable stars and a comet's orbit.

Richmond joined the Mount Wilson Observatory computing department in 1913, and retired in 1947, after she "ably assisted in a large number of stellar and solar investigations." She was listed as a member of the observatory's "investigatory staff" in 1917. Her work also helped to establish the location of the planet Pluto, and of the moons of Jupiter. She contributed to several observatory publications, including A photometric study of the pleiades (1931, with Harlow Shapley), Mean distribution of stars according to apparent magnitude and galactic latitude (1925), The mean color-index of stars of different apparent magnitudes. Some relations between magnitude scales (1925), and Mount Wilson catalogue of photographic magnitudes in selected areas 1–139 (1930). She co-authored articles with American astronomer Seth Barnes Nicholson and Danish astronomer Julie Vinter Hansen.

== Personal life ==
Richmond enjoyed hiking. She died in 1973, aged 90 years, in Pasadena. Her gravesite is in Woodstock, Vermont, her father's hometown.
