= Mothers' Educational Center =

Mothers' Educational Center (full name, Mothers' Educational Center Association) was an American woman's organization established in Los Angeles, California in 1916. It was an outgrowth of the National Baby Week inaugurated in that year by the federal government. Thousands of mothers, both U.S. and foreign born, used its privileges.

== History ==
Los Angeles was the first among the cities of the far western United States to recognize a need of educational centers for parents, and established a mothers' educational center. It started and was maintained by the clubwomen interested in social service. The Chamber of Commerce furnished free quarters for exhibits, lectures and demonstrations and it was expected that after the work was more firmly established and it had demonstrated to the city and county governments that valuable community service was being rendered, financial aid would be forthcoming and an annual appropriation would be available from the public funds.

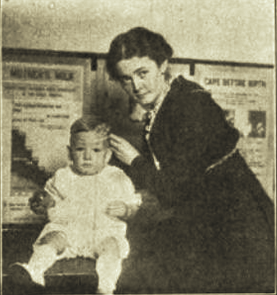
Dr. Maude Wilde at work in the Mothers' Educational Center, Chamber of Commerce Building, Los Angeles, California (1917)

The need of the work became apparent when early in 1914, a test of the birth registration was made by Dr. Maud Wilde, chair of public health department, Los Angeles district, California Federation of Women's Clubs, in cooperation with the Children's Bureau, Department of Labor, Washington, D.C. At this time, it was evident to Wilde that parents were seeking knowledge they might apply in order to better raise their children. The demand for this sort of education assumed tangible form following the celebration of the nationwide Baby Week, in March 1916..

National Baby Week was first observed in March 1916, at the joint suggestion of the Children's Bureau and the General Federation of Women's Clubs. The purpose was to stimulate interest in the proper care of infants and by means of exhibits and conferences, to bring to the attention of parents the standards of infant welfare which had been developed by experts who had studied the subject. In order to promote the success of this work, the Bureau prepared a pamphlet entitled Baby Week Campaigns, describing the methods used in the earlier urban baby-week observances whose success had encouraged the belief that a nation-wide observance would be practicable. This pamphlet was revised to include the best original ideas and devices developed during the campaign of 1916. A similar movement was carried on in 1917. The work begun in these campaigns was developed even more extensively in 1918 in connection with Children's Year activities.

The city, county, civic and child welfare organizations joined forces for infant conservation at this time and a committee was named to establish a permanent center. The purpose of the organization was to place within the reach of all parents, practical and scientific knowledge in the care and development of the child and to awaken a civic consciousness and elevate the status of motherhood. The methods of accomplishment were through education and social service.

In the educational course, a beginning was made with the preparation for parenthood and consideration was given to every phase of child development through its first six years. These various subjects were presented by lectures, conferences and exhibits. Two days of each week were devoted to examinations of infants and lectures on child welfare in the hall provided by the Chamber of Commerce, which also contained pictorial exhibits illustrating the effects of improper methods of handling babies.

The child to profit by the parents' course first was subjected to a physical and psychological examination. During this, the parent was instructed in the manner of overcoming any patent defect existing. It was not considered sufficient to know the child of the present-day, but to know its potential mental and physical capacity, entailing a comprehensive study of the child, as well as the heredity and stability of the infant's ancestry. It was believed that the greatest value of the educational center was the early recognition of conditions leading to instability before the nerve centers were fully formed. Thus the care and training of the child could be changed and its potential capacity increased to the highest point of which it was capable.

The mother was given a score card providing for a brief history of the parentage and the general condition of the child. Where faulty conditions exist, dates for subsequent examinations were set in order that both mother and child could be kept under observation. From these cards, the mothers whose children showed the same characteristics of under-development were formed into groups and the lecture and conference work was planned so that they could receive help in their individual cases. The center was officially opened September 18, 1916 and during the first two months, there were 503 mothers enrolled. The children examined represented every section of the city and county. In nationality, the Americans lead with Germans second. Other nationalities included Irish, Swedish and Polish. The educational standing of the parents showed that the largest percentage had completed the eighth grade; second, the high school; third, the college or university, and fourth, those who had left school below the eighth grade. In occupations of parents, the highest percentage is clerical; second, mechanics; third, managers of small stores, departments, etc.; fourth, day laborers; fifth, teachers and ranchers.

By 1919, it held conferences at county fairs and other gatherings, providing to mothers needed instruction as to the food, clothing, habits, play, and general training of the child.
