= Cleo Spurlock Wallace =

American speech therapist

Cleo Spurlock Wallace (July 29, 1914 – August 26, 1985) was an American speech therapist born in Garo, Colorado.

In 1933, Spurlock was one of the first six recipients of four-year scholarships to the University of Denver; she graduated in 1937. That same year, she married investment broker Thomas Wallace.

She subsequently earned a Rockefeller Foundation Teaching Fellowship to the University of Denver, where she received a master's degree in speech pathology in 1943.

Wallace then began teaching high school, where she received her first referral from a local physician. She worked with the child after school in her home; before long, she began treating other children with speech and language disorders. In 1948, to meet the needs of her growing clientele, she purchased two buildings with the help of businessman Henry Winter and founded Wallace Village for Children, a nonprofit organization. When her husband died that same year, she turned all of her attention to her work. She paid one dollar for a five-year lease on a building at 4414 Logan Street, and moved in with five teachers and thirty students.

By 1954, the Wallace Village for Children was the beneficiary of community support, and with local assistance, the organization purchased 84 acres (340,000 m^{2}) at 100th Avenue and Wadsworth, the site of today’s Westminster Campus. At that time, residential services were added to the outpatient and day treatment programs. In 1974, Wallace retired, but remained actively involved until her death in 1985. In 1986, the organization’s name was changed to the Cleo Wallace Center and later to Devereux Cleo Wallace after its affiliation with the Devereux Foundation.

Wallace received numerous awards during her lifetime related to her work with children with disabilities. These awards included the Evans Award from the University of Denver Alumni Association, representing the highest honor awarded by the Alumni Association. She also received an appointment to the White House Conference on Services for Handicapped Children, and a presidential appointment to the National Advisory of Neurological Diseases and Stroke Council.
