= Bernadine Abbott-Hoduski =

American librarian

Bernadine E. Abbott-Hoduski (born January 27, 1938) is an American librarian and author who was a founding member of The Government Documents Round Table (GODORT) of the American Library Association in 1972.

She was born in New Deal, Montana, to homesteaders Bryce and Phyllis Abbott. Her career in libraries has included 21 years as a Professional Staff Member for the Joint Committee on Printing of the United States Congress. She previously worked as the Assistant Professor and Director of the Government Documents Department at Central Missouri State University. As Head Librarian of the United States Environmental Protection Agency in Kansas City, Missouri, she was awarded the EPA Bronze Medal for Commendable Service in 1973.

In 1965, she earned her Master's of Arts degree in Librarianship from the University of Denver, Colorado. She won the James Bennett Childs Award for distinguished contributions to document librarianship from ALA's GODORT in 1973, the Ainsworth Rand Spofford President's Award from the District of Columbia Library Association in 1994.

Abbott-Hoduski retired in 1997, but continues to advocate public access to government information through writing and speaking engagements.
