= Linda Alterwitz =

American artist

- Born: 1960 (age 65–66); Gary, Indiana, US
- Education: University of Denver, University of Colorado, Boulder
- Known for: Photography, collage, installation
- Awards: Nevada Arts Council
- Website: Linda Alterwitz

Linda Alterwitz, Untitled #16, photograph from the project "While I Am Still," 24" x 24", 2010.

Linda Alterwitz (born 1960) is an American visual artist whose work Integrates art, science and technology, investigating the inner workings of the human body and its connection to the natural world and cosmos. Her practice includes photographic and collaged works, immersive installations and participatory methods, and employs alternative imaging devices ranging from low-tech plastic cameras to advanced medical diagnostic machines. Her complex images frequently superimpose medical visualizations (x-rays, MRI scans, thermographic images) onto abstracted portraits and landscapes, blurring distinctions between the outer body, its underlying systems and organs, and the external environment.

Alterwitz has exhibited at institutions including the New Mexico Museum of Art, Lancaster Museum of Art and History (MOAH), Mayo Clinic Florida, Aberystwyth Arts Centre (Wales), Barrick Museum of Art, and Lilley Museum of Art. Her work belongs to the public art collections of the Center for Creative Photography, Nevada Museum of Art, and Hilliard Art Museum, among others. She is based in Las Vegas, Nevada.

== Early life and career ==
Alterwitz was born in Gary, Indiana in 1960, and at age 13, moved with her family to Las Vegas. She studied art at the University of Colorado, Boulder (BFA, 1982) and University of Denver (MFA, 1984), where she concentrated on painting and drawing strongly influenced by Abstract Expressionism. After graduating, she returned to Las Vegas to raise her family and work full-time while continuing to paint large-scale, abstract works in her free time.

In the early 2000s, she turned to photography, seeking to integrate science and technology into her work. The transformational event was a personal medical diagnosis of a brain tumor—ultimately removed and benign—through which she received MRI scans of her brain. After her recovery, she was inspired to combine them with landscape images, exploring unseen rhythms in the natural world.

Alterwitz began exhibiting her work at this time, gaining her first solo exhibition through the Nevada Arts Council in 2011. Subsequent solo and two-person exhibitions were held at the Los Angeles Center for Digital Art (2011, 2014), the Aberystwyth Arts Centre (2016), Mayo Clinic (2019), Missoula Art Museum (2020), Hilliard Art Museum (2021–22) and Lilley Museum of Art (2023), among others. In 2015, her mid-career retrospective, "While I Am Still," was presented at The Studio at Sahara West Library in Las Vegas, coinciding with a limited-edition publication. She appeared in the Getty Initiative/PST ART exhibition, "Desert Forest: Life With Joshua Trees" at MOAH (2024) and was included in the 2025 FORMAT International Photography Festival.

In addition to her art practice, Alterwitz has facilitated educational programming at art and medical institutions and written the Art + Science column in Lenscratch magazine, a feature that she established in 2015.

Linda Alterwitz, Just Breathe, unique installation for the exhibition "Breath Taking," New Mexico Museum of Art, 2020.

== Work and reception ==
Alterwitz's work has been influenced by her training in painting, the experimental practices of early 20th-century photographers such as Man Ray and Laszlo Maholy-Nagy, and the social-documentary work of contemporary photographers like David Maisel and Sally Mann. Writers suggest that her multi-layered work addresses various physical and psychological dichotomies: external and internal, individual and universal, microcosm and macrocosm, the visible and hidden, comfort and discomfort. Lilley Museum director Stephanie Gibson wrote, "Alterwitz's images ask us to contemplate this inevitable finitude, reminding us that our bodies are imperfect vessels. She does so poetically, however, challenging the viewer to reflect on what we are made of—our thoughts and experiences or our veins, bones, and internal cavities."

=== Projects ===
In her early projects, Alterwitz digitally reshaped medical imagery into moody, ambiguous and layered landscapes that connected bodies, matter and land as one. She repurposed positron emission tomography (PET) scans in the "While I Am Still" project (2009–14) using alternative, low-tech cameras, then digitally overlaid them with her photographs of landscape and fabrics. The resulting black-and-white and color images revealed ethereal, ghost-like figures that seemed to wrestle with fleeting moments of sadness, fear, comfort and hope. The series and its title reference the literal—and claustrophobic—stillness required for MRI scans and explore contrasts during such testing between physical confinement and mental wandering, and the refuge of the familiar versus the fear of the unknown.

The large-format "Flesh and Bone" series (2010–11) used canine X-rays, frequently revealing bone, muscle, internal organs and foreign devices beneath the skin used in repair, such as plastic sutures, metal screws and plates. For the "Signatures of Heat" project (2012–20), Alterwitz secured use of a thermographic camera (typically used for military, police or medical purposes), which detected radiant heat rather than light. The camera uncovered hidden, unexpected thermal signatures in everyday images of family, friends, strangers, dogs and the natural world, offering an alternative way of seeing and portraying the world.

Linda Alterwitz, Self Without Interpretation, installation, Lilley Museum of Art, 2023.

Alterwitz's "Just Breathe" project (2013–19) emphasized both the individuality and universality of human experience in the cosmos by focusing on breath and the night sky. It consisted of 188 "breathing portraits" captured by resting a camera on a person's chest and pointing it up to the night sky for a 30-second exposure. The movement of each person's breath created a unique, finger-print-like visual oscillation of the stars above. For exhibition, the portraits were assembled in a grid that critics likened to a large star field or microcosm of life on earth.

The emphasis on breath led Alterwitz to diagnostic processes capturing other internal rhythms of the body in the series "Once Ocean" (2015–17), "Envisioning the Veil" (2017–19) and "Self Without Interpretation" (2019–21). The latter two projects used visual data derived from electroencephalogram (EEG) scans made during distress or the contemplation of love and loss, which she printed on surgical gauze, evoking both pain and healing. For "Envisioning the Veil," she sewed the printed scans with medical suture thread onto her own photographs of mysterious landscapes and abstracted homes; for "Self Without Interpretation," she photographed them at outdoor sites participants named as personal sanctuaries and printed them on two-story silks. Much of this work was presented in the exhibition "Sanctuary" (Hilliard Art Museum, 2021) as an experiential installation that included simulated wind and a musical score and explored themes of refuge, conflict, healing and trauma.

For "Injection Site – Making the Vaccine Visible" (2021– ), Alterwitz closely photographed the COVID-19 injection sites of 130 participants using a high-resolution thermographic camera to capture each body's unique immunological response. The subjects appear as surreal, black-and-white figures mottled with dark blotches indicating heat and inflammation that Rosie Hillier wrote, "unlock a previously unseen view of the physiological effects of the COVID-19 vaccine on the human body."

== Recognition ==
Alterwitz's work belongs to the public collections of the Barrick Museum of Art, Center for Creative Photography, Hilliard Art Museum, Lilley Museum of Art, Missoula Art Museum, and Nevada Museum of Art, among others. She has received grants and fellowships from the Nevada Arts Council (2014, 2016, 2025), the Puffin Foundation (2015) and the Montana Arts Council (2020). In 2015, Alterwitz was named the first artist-in-residence for the Las Vegas–Clark County Library District Foundation, and was selected for an artist residency at the Mayo Clinic Florida. She was the keynote speaker at the Claremont McKenna College program, "At the Intersection of Art and Science" in 2023.
