= Grizzly Peak (Summit County, Colorado) =

Mountain in Colorado, USA

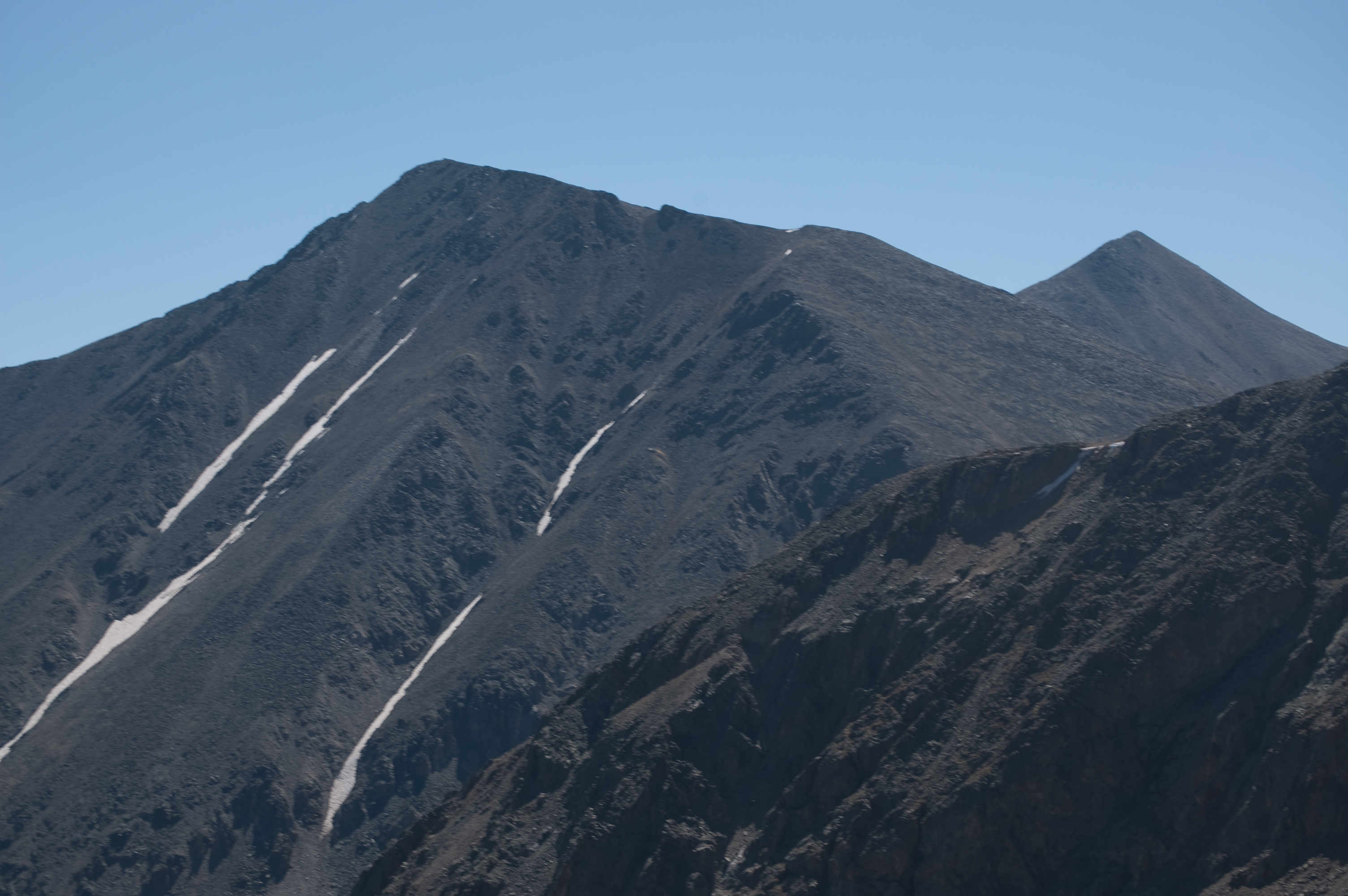
- The north face of Grizzly Peak, seen from Clear Creek County

Highest point
- Elevation: 13,433 ft (4,094 m)
- Prominence: 847 ft (258 m)
- Isolation: 1.48 mi (2.38 km)
- Coordinates: 39°38′40″N 105°50′55″W

Geography
- Location within Colorado
- Location: Continental Divide between Clear Creek and Summit counties, Colorado, United States
- Parent range: Front Range
- Topo map(s): USGS 7.5' topographic map Grays Peak, Colorado

Climbing
- Easiest route: Trail hike

Grizzly Peak is a high mountain summit in the Front Range of the Rocky Mountains of North America. Also known as Grizzly Peak D, the 13,433-foot (4,094 m) thirteener is located in Arapaho National Forest, 2.1 miles (3.4 km) southeast by east (bearing 129°) of Loveland Pass, Colorado, United States, on the Continental Divide between Clear Creek and Summit counties. Its proximate parent peak is Torreys Peak.

== Location and geography ==
Grizzly Peak sits along the Continental Divide on the Front Range of the Rocky Mountains. The summit is located near Interstate 70, east of the Eisenhower-Johnson Memorial Tunnel. The larger Grays Peak (14,278 feet (4,400 m)) and Torreys Peak (14,275 feet (4,400 m)) sit nearby, and the closest major town is Silver Plume, Colorado. It is also near Mount Sniktau, which rises to 13,235 feet (4,034 m) at its peak. Other nearby points of interest include Loveland Ski Area, Breckenridge Ski Resort, Keystone Ski Resort and the Arapahoe Basin.

== Climate ==
Climate data for Grizzly Peak, Colorado (Grizzly Peak Snotel), 1991–2020 normals, extremes 1983–present
Month	Jan	Feb	Mar	Apr	May	Jun	Jul	Aug	Sep	Oct	Nov	Dec	Year
Record high °F (°C)	67 (19)	68 (20)	73 (23)	80 (27)	77 (25)	79 (26)	81 (27)	78 (26)	74 (23)	67 (19)	68 (20)	58 (14)	81 (27)
Mean maximum °F (°C)	41.7 (5.4)	42.9 (6.1)	50.2 (10.1)	54.9 (12.7)	62.2 (16.8)	70.5 (21.4)	72.9 (22.7)	70.2 (21.2)	66.3 (19.1)	58.7 (14.8)	48.7 (9.3)	41.7 (5.4)	73.6 (23.1)
Mean daily maximum °F (°C)	26.2 (−3.2)	28.1 (−2.2)	35.3 (1.8)	41.3 (5.2)	49.6 (9.8)	60.2 (15.7)	65.4 (18.6)	62.6 (17.0)	56.1 (13.4)	44.9 (7.2)	33.1 (0.6)	25.5 (−3.6)	44.0 (6.7)
Daily mean °F (°C)	17.3 (−8.2)	18.5 (−7.5)	25.1 (−3.8)	30.8 (−0.7)	39.3 (4.1)	48.9 (9.4)	54.1 (12.3)	51.9 (11.1)	45.7 (7.6)	35.6 (2.0)	24.8 (−4.0)	17.2 (−8.2)	34.1 (1.2)
Mean daily minimum °F (°C)	8.4 (−13.1)	8.8 (−12.9)	14.7 (−9.6)	20.3 (−6.5)	29.0 (−1.7)	37.5 (3.1)	42.9 (6.1)	41.3 (5.2)	35.7 (2.1)	26.0 (−3.3)	16.1 (−8.8)	8.4 (−13.1)	24.1 (−4.4)
Mean minimum °F (°C)	−8.6 (−22.6)	−7.9 (−22.2)	−2.4 (−19.1)	5.3 (−14.8)	16.1 (−8.8)	27.6 (−2.4)	36.6 (2.6)	35.4 (1.9)	23.0 (−5.0)	7.8 (−13.4)	−4.0 (−20.0)	−10.8 (−23.8)	−13.7 (−25.4)
Record low °F (°C)	−19 (−28)	−26 (−32)	−17 (−27)	−6 (−21)	6 (−14)	16 (−9)	24 (−4)	27 (−3)	5 (−15)	−7 (−22)	−14 (−26)	−26 (−32)	−26 (−32)
Average precipitation inches (mm)	3.12 (79)	3.12 (79)	3.26 (83)	3.90 (99)	2.98 (76)	1.54 (39)	2.20 (56)	2.12 (54)	1.82 (46)	2.09 (53)	2.52 (64)	2.81 (71)	31.48 (799)
Average extreme snow depth inches (cm)	50.2 (128)	60.2 (153)	65.3 (166)	66.4 (169)	51.8 (132)	14.7 (37)	0.4 (1.0)	0.5 (1.3)	1.6 (4.1)	11.3 (29)	23.7 (60)	36.3 (92)	70.9 (180)
Average precipitation days (≥ 0.01 in)	13.9	14.0	15.6	16.7	13.2	7.2	10.0	10.0	8.7	10.9	11.0	12.5	143.7
Source 1: NOAA
Source 2: National Weather Service (snow depth 2006–2020)

== Other summits with same name ==
The state of Colorado actually has four other Grizzly Peaks and one Grizzly Mountain on record. The Grizzly Peak in Chaffee County, which sits in the Sawatch Range, is the tallest of these. The Summit County Grizzly Peak is fourth-tallest of the mountains, and is thus also referred to as "Grizzly Peak D":

Rank	Mountain	Elevation	Range
54	Grizzly Peak	13,995 ft (4,266 m)	Sawatch Range
130	Grizzly Peak	13,738 ft (4,187 m)	San Juan Mountains
142	Grizzly Mountain	13,708 ft (4,178 m)	Sawatch Range
145	Grizzly Peak	13,700 ft (4,176 m)	San Juan Mountains
302	Grizzly Peak	13,433 feet (4,094 m)	Front Range
415	Grizzly Peak	13,281 ft (4,048 m)	Sawatch Range

== Hiking ==
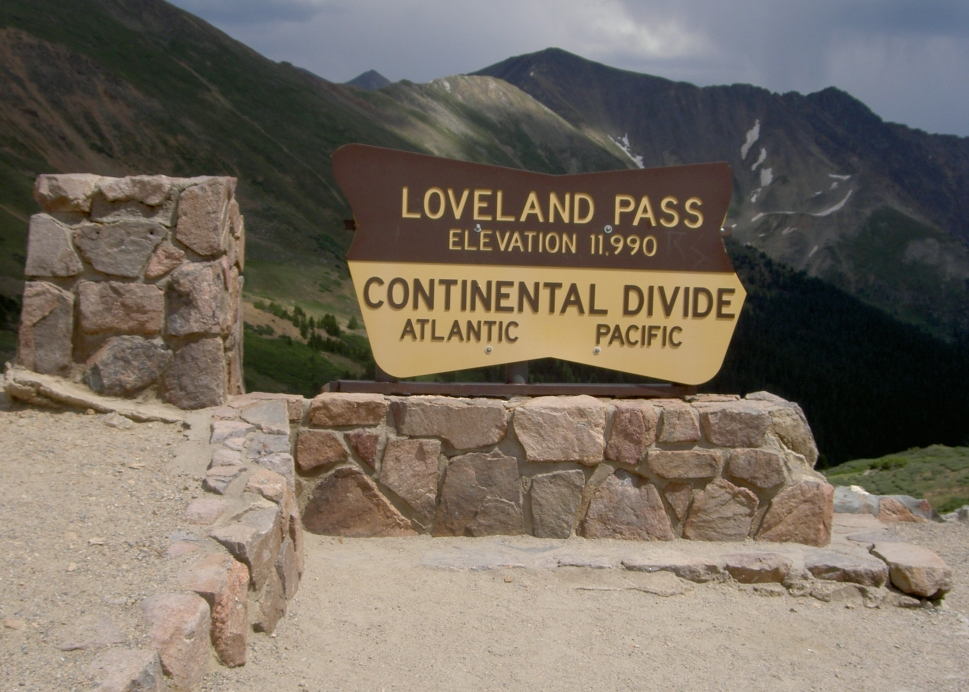
The Loveland Pass sign, with the mountain's peak visible behind it at center

The trail to Grizzly Peak, which allows hikers to reach the summit of the mountain by foot, is accessible immediately off of a parking lot at Loveland Pass on U.S. Highway 6. The trailhead begins above the treeline at about 12,000 feet (3,700 m) and rises to the peak, but reaching the summit does not necessarily require the use of extra mountain climbing equipment such as ropes. Visitors can also reach Mount Sniktau, a smaller peak, from the same point along Loveland Pass.

From the summit, hikers can see Loveland Pass below them, plus views of nearby Chihuahua Lake and the Arapahoe Basin ski trails.

== Historical names ==
- Grizzly Peak
- Grizzly Peak D

== See also ==
- List of Colorado mountain ranges
- List of Colorado mountain summits
  - List of Colorado fourteeners
  - List of Colorado 4000 meter prominent summits
  - List of the most prominent summits of Colorado
- List of Colorado county high points
