= Grizzly Peak =

Grizzly Peak may refer to:

== United States ==
- Grizzly Peak, California, an unincorporated community
- Grizzly Peak (Disney California Adventure), a themed land in a theme park

=== Mountains ===
- Grizzly Peak (Berkeley Hills), California
- Grizzly Peak (Mariposa County, California)
- Grizzly Peak (Dolores/San Juan Counties, Colorado), a mountain in Colorado
- Grizzly Peak (Gunnison County, Colorado), a mountain in Colorado
- Grizzly Peak (La Plata County, Colorado), a mountain in Colorado
- Grizzly Peak (Sawatch Range), Colorado
- Grizzly Peak (Summit County, Colorado)
- Grizzly Peak (Montana), a mountain in Carbon County, Montana
- Grizzly Peak (Oregon)
- Grizzly Peak (Wyoming), a mountain in Yellowstone National Park

== Elsewhere ==
- Grizzly Peak (Antarctica)

== See also ==
- Grizzly Mountain (disambiguation)
