= Mount Parnassus (Colorado) =

Mountain in the state of Colorado

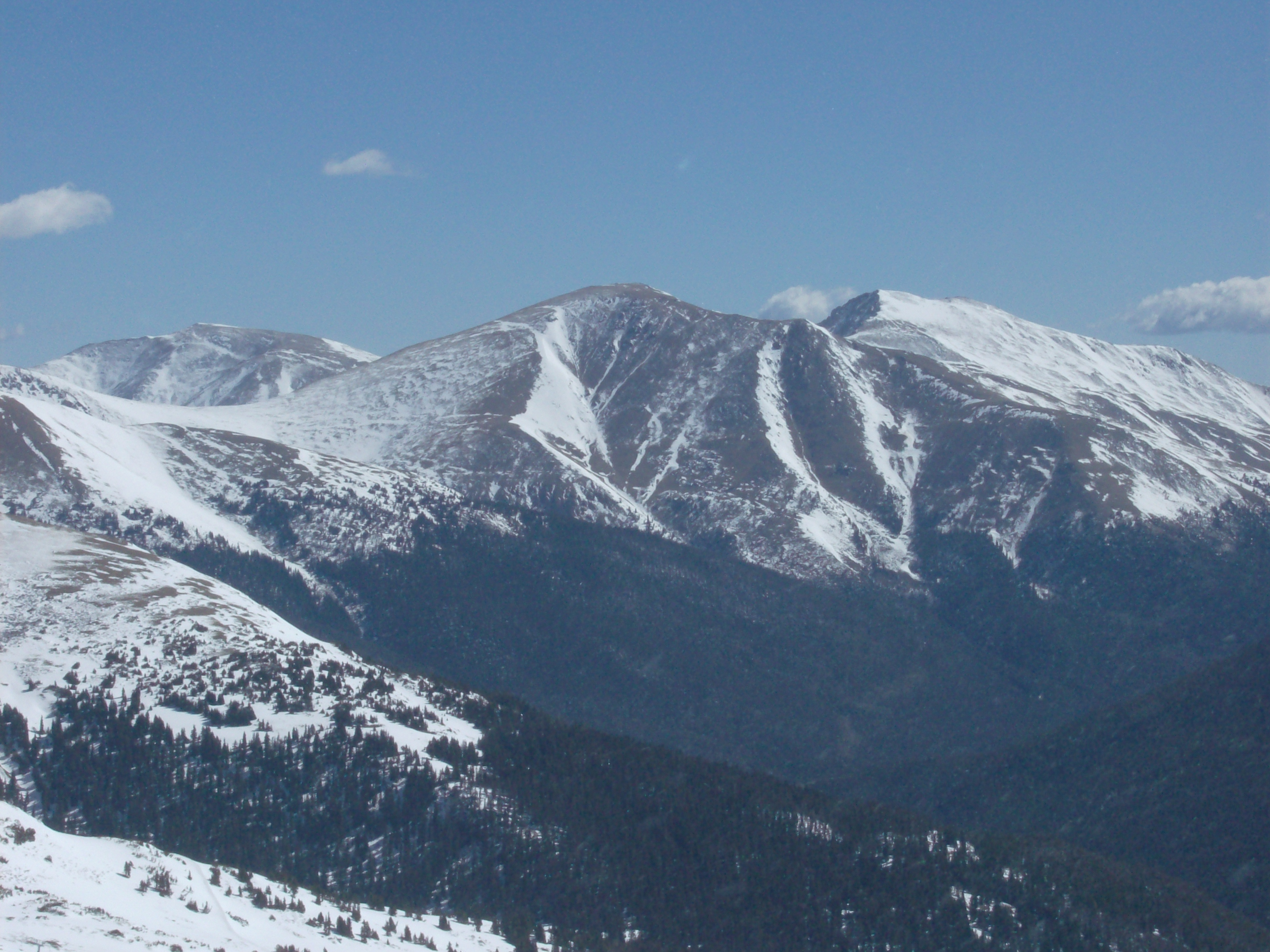
- Mount Parnassus, as seen from Loveland Ski Area

Highest point
- Elevation: 13,580 ft (4,139 m)
- Prominence: 537 ft (164 m)
- Isolation: 0.98 mi (1.58 km)
- Coordinates: 39°43′12″N 105°49′21″W

Geography
- Location within Colorado
- Location: Clear Creek County, Colorado, United States
- Parent range: Front Range
- Topo map(s): USGS 7.5' topographic map Grays Peak, Colorado

Climbing
- Easiest route: Hiking

Mount Parnassus is a high mountain summit in the Front Range of the Rocky Mountains of North America. The 13,580-foot (4,139 m) thirteener is located in Arapaho National Forest, 5.4 miles (8.7 km) west-northwest (bearing 288°) of the Town of Silver Plume in Clear Creek County, Colorado, United States.

== Location and geography ==
Mount Parnassus sits east of the Continental Divide in the Front Range of the Rocky Mountains. The summit is located near Interstate 70. The higher Bard Peak, at 13,647 feet (4,160 m), sits nearby, and the closest major town is Silver Plume, Colorado. It is also in close proximity to Woods Mountain, Mount Sniktau, Engelmann Peak, Robeson Peak, and Pettingell Peak.

== Hiking ==
By automobile, Mount Parnassus is about one hour west of Denver. Hikers may reach the summit of the mountain on foot by following the Watrous Gulch Trail, starting at the Herman Gulch Trailhead off of Interstate 70. From the trailhead, visitors must hike roughly 7 miles (round trip) and gain roughly 3,300 feet (1,000 m) in elevation to reach the summit.

== Historical names ==
- Mount Parnassus – 1933
- Scout Peak

== See also ==
- List of Colorado mountain ranges
- List of Colorado mountain summits
  - List of Colorado fourteeners
  - List of Colorado 4000 meter prominent summits
  - List of the most prominent summits of Colorado
- List of Colorado county high points
