= Mount Sniktau =

Mountain in the state of Colorado

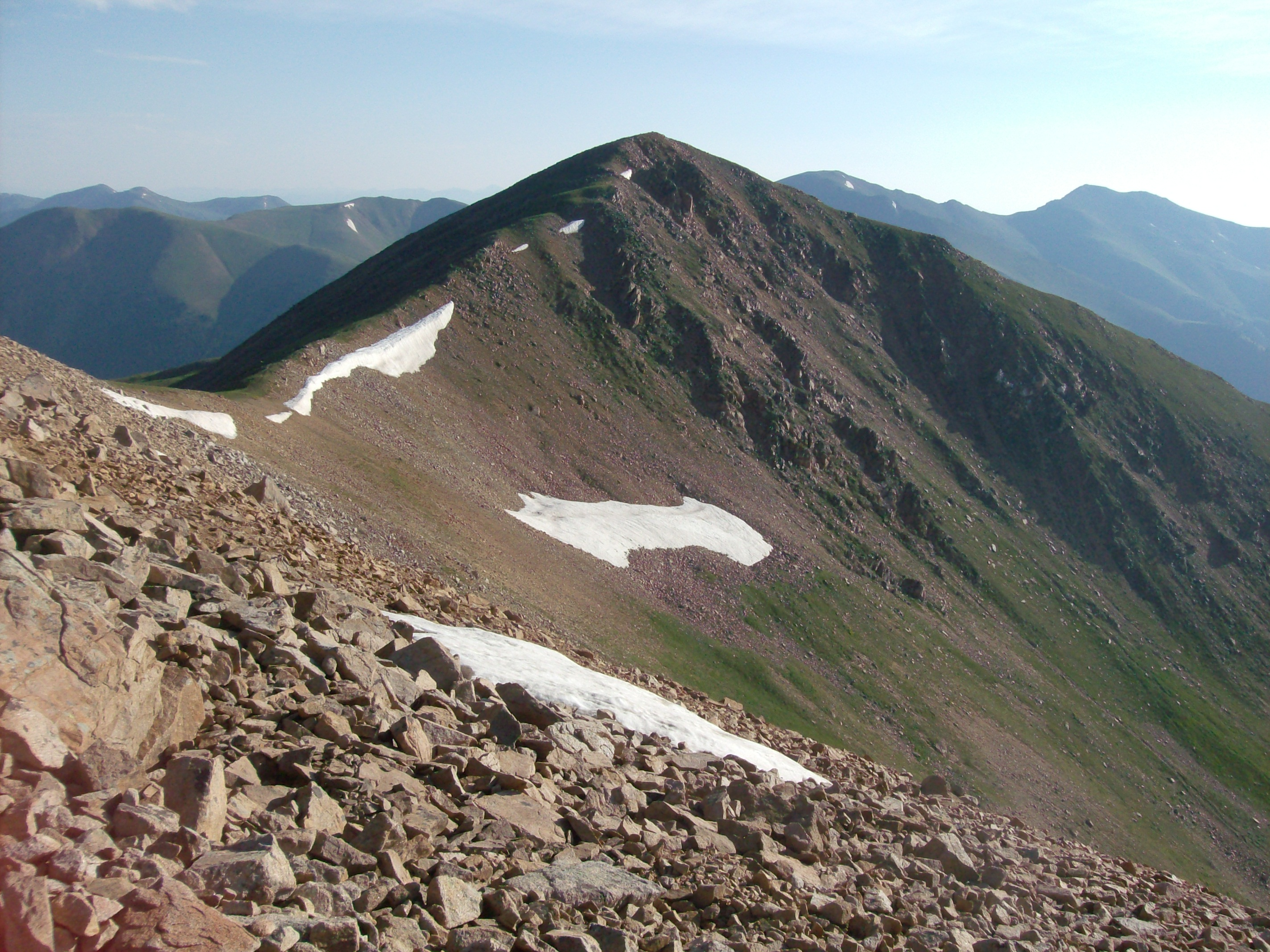
- Mount Sniktau viewed from Point 13152.

Highest point
- Elevation: 13,240 ft (4,036 m)
- Prominence: 520 ft (158 m)
- Isolation: 2.41 mi (3.88 km)
- Coordinates: 39°40′42″N 105°51′28″W

Geography
- Location within Colorado Location within the United States
- Location: Clear Creek County, Colorado, U.S.
- Parent range: Front Range
- Topo map(s): USGS 7.5' topographic map Grays Peak, Colorado

Climbing
- Easiest route: Trail hike

Mount Sniktau is a high mountain summit in the Front Range of the Rocky Mountains of North America. The 13,240-foot (4,036 m) thirteener is located in Arapaho National Forest, 1.6 miles (2.5 km) northeast (bearing 48°) of Loveland Pass in Clear Creek County, Colorado, United States.

== Name ==
The name "Sniktau" refers to the pen name of Edwin H. N. Patterson, a journalist in the Clear Creek County area during the 1860s. Patterson was a close friend of the famous poet, Edgar Allan Poe, and the two men are known to have exchanged letters in the 1840s.

Patterson claimed to have received the nickname "Sniktau" from Native Americans, although it may simply have been adopted from a fellow journalist named W. F. Watkins, who had reversed the letters of his own name to create the pen name "Sniktaw." Patterson had moved to Colorado from his native Oquawka, Illinois, in 1875 to become editor of the Colorado Miner, a newspaper printed in Georgetown, roughly 15 miles from the mountain. He is buried in Alvarado Cemetery, located near Georgetown.

== Location and geography ==
Mount Sniktau sits immediately east of the Continental Divide on the Front Range of the Rocky Mountains. The summit is located less than a mile south of Interstate 70 and east of the Eisenhower Tunnel. The larger Grays Peak, Torreys Peak, and Mount Parnassus sit within a 5-mile (8 km) radius of Mount Sniktau, and the closest major town is Silver Plume. By car, Mount Sniktau sits within the Arapaho National Forest and is roughly one hour west of Denver.

The mountain's immediate drainage basin is Clear Creek (Colorado) and then the South Platte River. Ultimately, runoff from the peak reaches the Platte River, the Missouri River, the Mississippi River and the Gulf of Mexico.

== Hiking ==
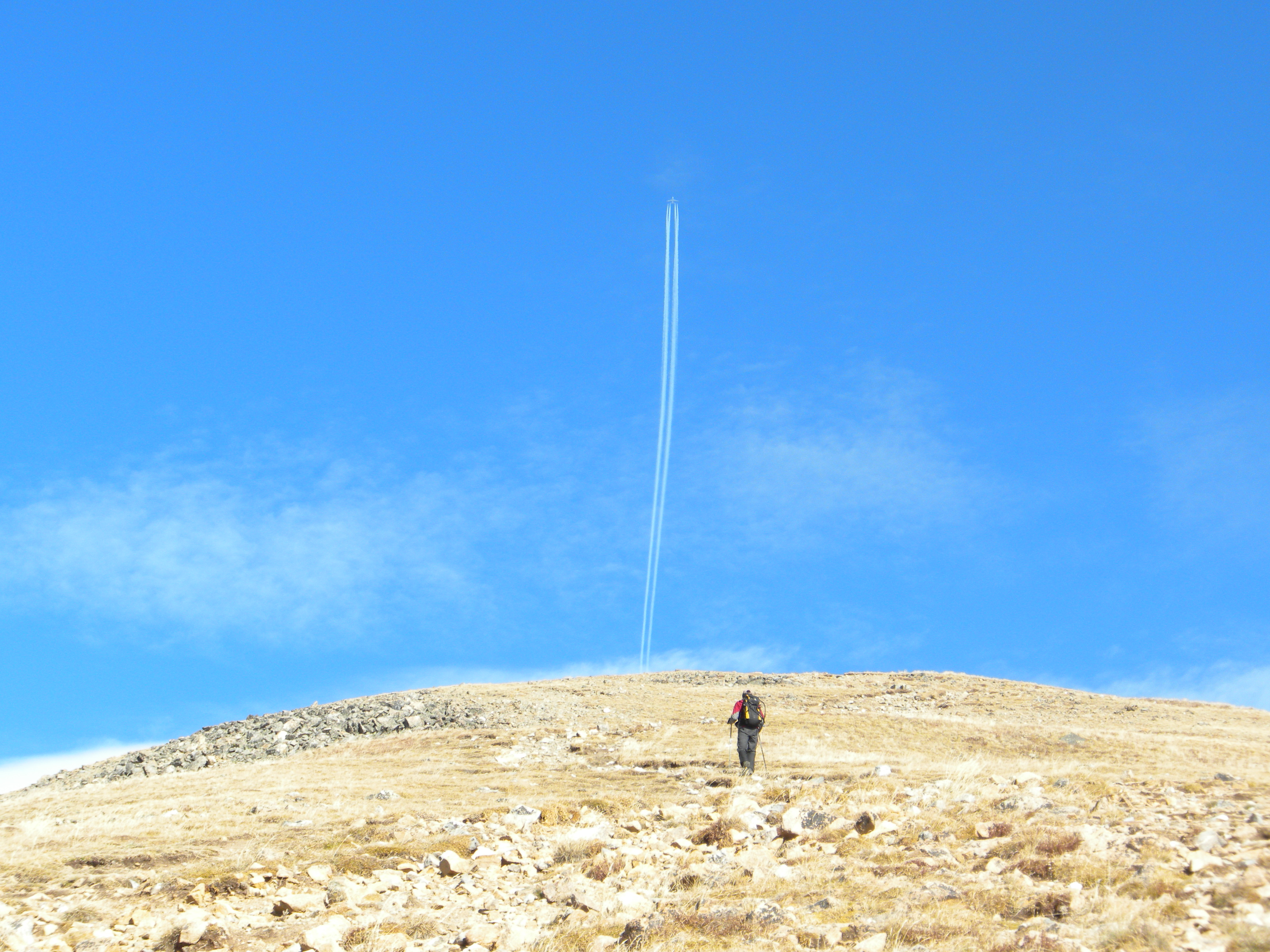
A hiker ascending the Mount Sniktau trail, with the mountain's south peak visible at center

The Mount Sniktau trail, which allows hikers to reach the summit of the mountain by foot, is accessible immediately off of a parking lot at Loveland Pass on U.S. Highway 6. The trailhead begins above the treeline at about 12,000 feet (3,660 m) and rises to 13,234 feet (4,034 m) at the peak, but reaching the summit does not necessarily require the use of extra mountain climbing equipment such as ropes. Visitors can also reach Grizzly Peak, a nearby mountain (not to be confused with the taller Grizzly Peak in Chaffee County), from the same point along Loveland Pass.

The walk from the trailhead at Loveland Pass to the peak measures about two miles, but it features an elevation gain of over 1,000 feet (300 m) in the initial mile of hiking. Because of its relatively convenient accessibility by automobile from population centers like Denver, Boulder, and Breckenridge, the mountain is a popular destination for hikers.

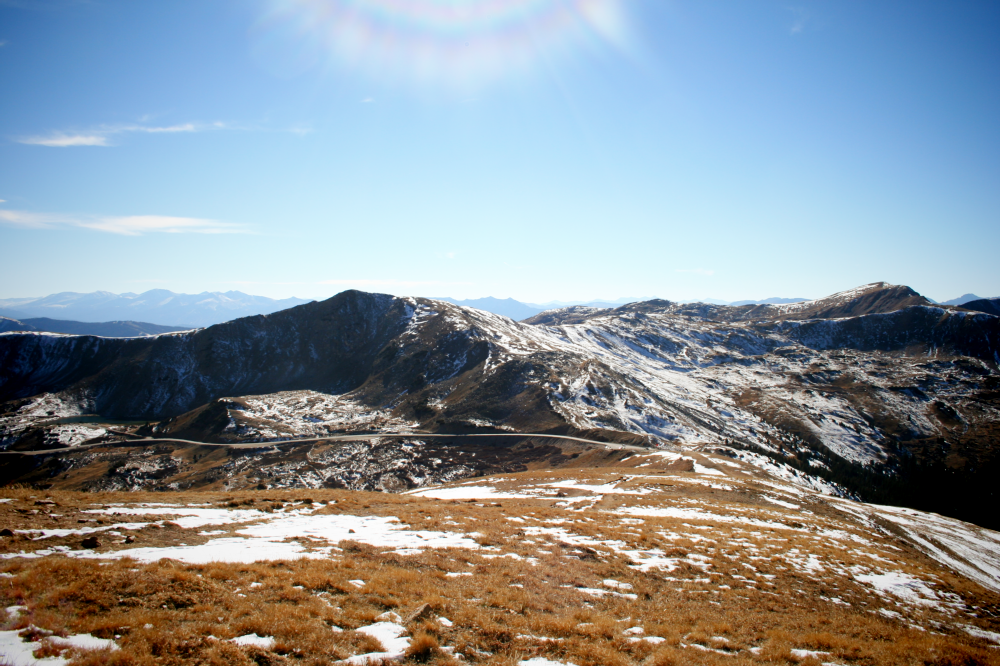
The view from the Mount Sniktau trail of the Rocky Mountains and Loveland Pass

From the summit, hikers see Loveland Pass below them at 11,990 ft (3,655 m), plus views of nearby Grizzly Peak, Grays Peak, Torreys Peak and the Gore Range. Also visible are the skiing runs of the adjacent Loveland Ski Area, as well as those of Arapahoe Basin, Keystone, and Breckenridge across the Divide in Summit County.

== Proposed Olympic venue ==
When the International Olympic Committee (IOC) awarded the 1976 Winter Olympics to Denver in May 1970, the local organizers' proposal included the development of Mount Sniktau as the primary venue for alpine ski racing for downhill and giant slalom, with slalom at Loveland Ski Area. By early 1972, it was decided to move the alpine events to Vail because the proposals did not meet the Olympic standards. Sniktau and Loveland were submitted in the 1970 bid to satisfy a requirement of proximity to the Olympic Village (at the University of Denver).

In November 1972, Colorado voters rejected public funding for the Olympics; three months later, the Games were relocated to Innsbruck, Austria, which had recently hosted in 1964. The next Winter Olympics in 1980 were in the U.S., at Lake Placid, New York.

== Historical names ==
- Big Professor
- Engelmann
- Engelmann Peak
- Mount Sniktau – 1926

== See also ==
- List of Colorado mountain ranges
- List of Colorado mountain summits
  - List of Colorado fourteeners
  - List of Colorado 4000 meter prominent summits
  - List of the most prominent summits of Colorado
- List of Colorado county high points
