= Grayrock Peak =

Mountain in Colorado, United States

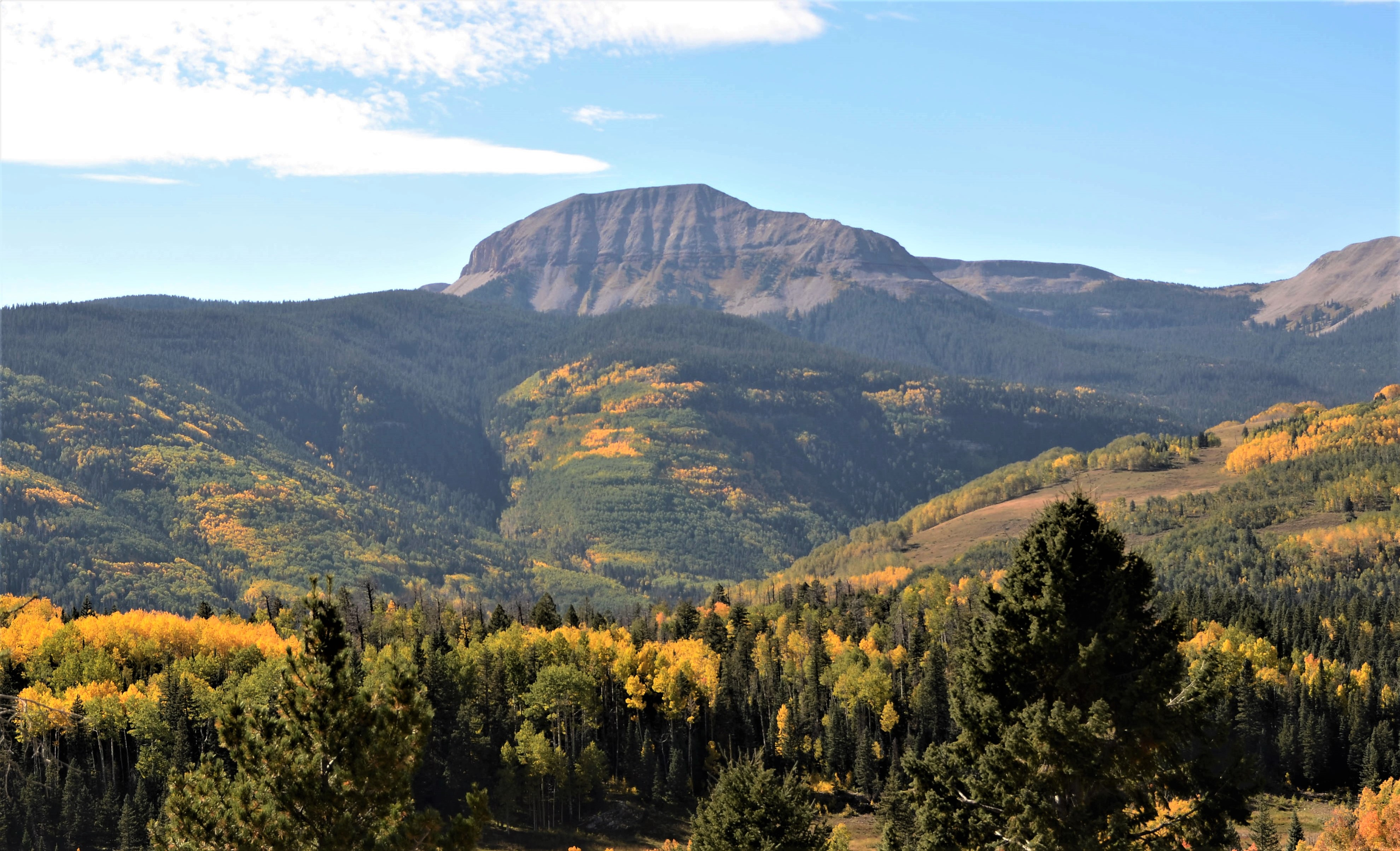
- East aspect

Highest point
- Elevation: 12,504 ft (3,811 m)
- Prominence: 764 ft (233 m)
- Parent peak: Grizzly Peak (13,738 ft)
- Isolation: 3.55 mi (5.71 km)
- Coordinates: 37°40′25″N 107°51′47″W

Geography
- Location within Colorado Location within the United States
- Country: United States
- State: Colorado
- County: San Juan
- Protected area: San Juan National Forest
- Parent range: Rocky Mountains; San Juan Mountains
- Topo map: USGS Engineer Mountain

Geology
- Rock type: Trachyte

Climbing
- Easiest route: class 2 hiking

Grayrock Peak is a 12,504-foot-elevation (3,811-meter) mountain summit located in San Juan County, Colorado, United States.

== Description ==
Grayrock Peak is set west of the Continental Divide in the San Juan Mountains which are a subrange of the Rocky Mountains. It is situated 28 miles (45 km) north of the community of Durango on land managed by San Juan National Forest. Grayrock is the highest point of Graysill Mountain. Precipitation runoff from the mountain drains into tributaries of the Animas River. Topographic relief is significant as the summit rises 3,400 feet (1,000 meters) above Cascade Creek in less than two miles. Neighbors include line parent Grizzly Peak 5.67 miles (9.12 km) to the north and Engineer Mountain, 3.54 miles (5.70 km) to the northeast. An ascent of the peak involves hiking 6.8 miles (10.9 km) with 2,104-feet of elevation gain. The mountain's toponym was officially adopted in 1908 by the United States Board on Geographic Names.

== Climate ==
According to the Köppen climate classification system, Grayrock Peak is located in an alpine subarctic climate zone with cold, snowy winters, and cool to warm summers. Due to its altitude, it receives precipitation all year, as snow in winter and as thunderstorms in summer, with a dry period in late spring. Hikers can expect afternoon rain, hail, and lightning from the seasonal monsoon in late July and August.

== Geology ==
Grayrock Peak is composed of trachyte, a light-colored extrusive igneous rock composed mostly of alkali feldspar. This rock falls from the high walls of the north cirque and forms a rock glacier that descends 1,000 feet and extends three-quarters of a mile.

== See also ==
- Mountains of San Juan County, Colorado
