= Grizzly Mountain =

Grizzly Mountain may refer to:

- Grizzly Mountain (Canada), Hermit Range, British Columbia
- Grizzly Mountain (Colorado)
- Grizzly Mountain (Montana), a mountain in Glacier National Park
- Grizzly Mountain (Oregon), a mountain
- Grizzly Mountain (film), a 1997 American film

== See also ==
- Grizzly Peak (disambiguation)
- Escape to Grizzly Mountain, a 2000 American film and sequel to the above film
