= Grizzly Peak (Sawatch Range) =

Mountain in the state of Colorado

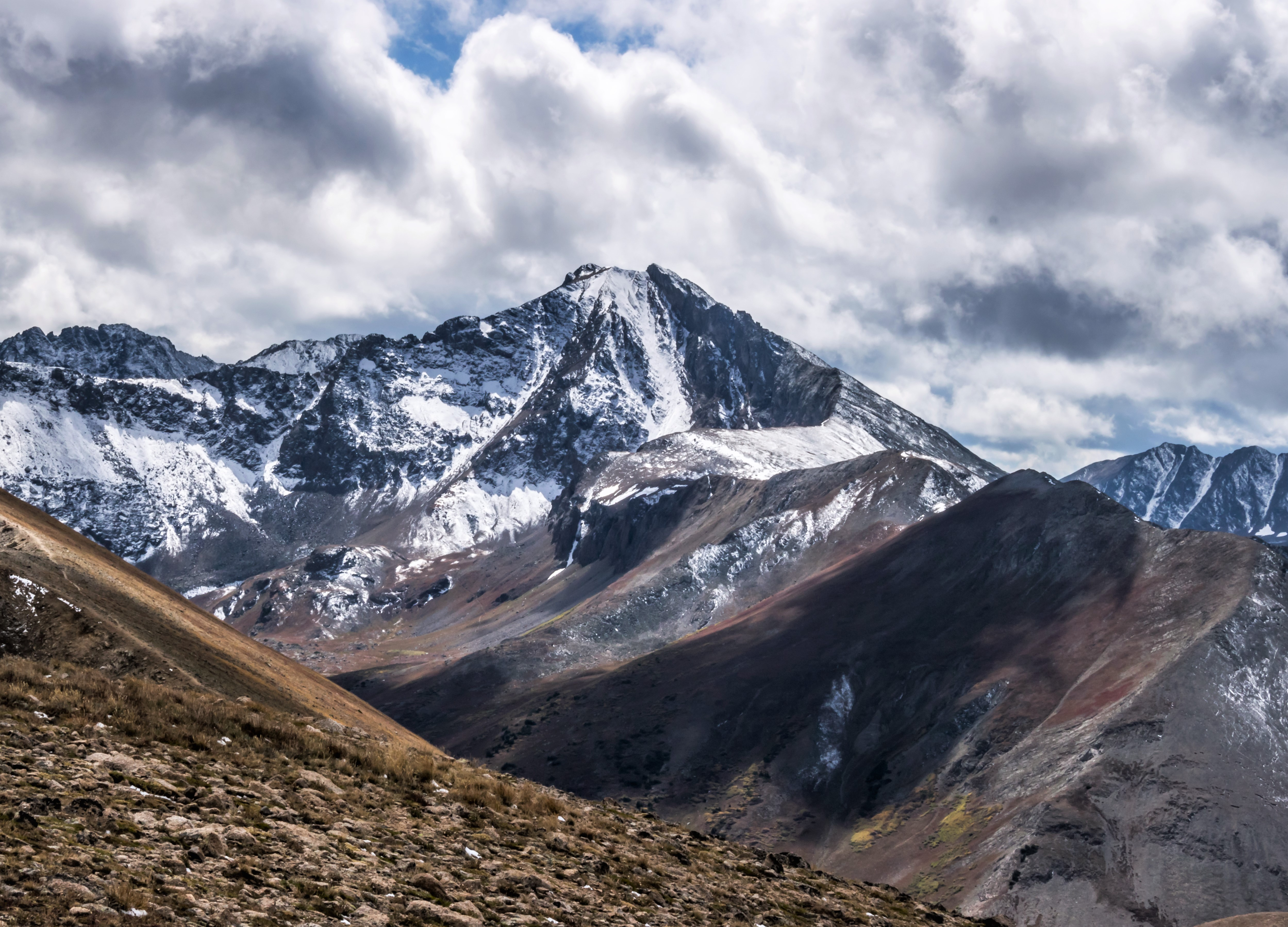
- North aspect

Highest point
- Elevation: 13,995 ft (4,266 m); NAVD88
- Prominence: 1928 ft (588 m)
- Isolation: 6.77 mi (10.89 km)
- Listing: North America highest peaks 61st; US highest major peaks 46th; Colorado highest major peaks 26th
- Coordinates: 39°02′33″N 106°35′51″W

Geography
- Location within Colorado
- Location: Continental Divide between Chaffee and Pitkin counties, Colorado, United States
- Parent range: Sawatch Range, Collegiate Peaks
- Topo map(s): USGS 7.5' topographic map Independence Pass, Colorado

Geology
- Rock age: Oligocene (~ 24–33 million yrs)

Climbing
- Easiest route: Scramble, class 2+

Grizzly Peak is a high and prominent mountain summit of the Collegiate Peaks in the Sawatch Range of the Rocky Mountains of North America. The 13,995-foot (4265.6 m) thirteener is located 2.6 miles (4.2 km) south-southwest (bearing 202°) of Independence Pass, Colorado, United States, on the Continental Divide separating San Isabel National Forest and Chaffee County from White River National Forest and Pitkin County.

== Elevation ==
Grizzly Peak is the highest summit in the United States less than 14,000 feet (4,267.2 m), making it the highest thirteener in the country. At one time, the peak's elevation was measured to be over 14,000 feet and was believed to be a fourteener, but more recent and accurate surveys have dropped it below that threshold.

== Geology ==
The mountain is composed of andesite lava flows and breccias of Oligocene age.

== Climate ==
Climate data for Grizzly Peak 39.0395 N, 106.5989 W, Elevation: 13,396 ft (4,083 m) (1991–2020 normals)
Month	Jan	Feb	Mar	Apr	May	Jun	Jul	Aug	Sep	Oct	Nov	Dec	Year
Mean daily maximum °F (°C)	20.8 (−6.2)	19.9 (−6.7)	26.5 (−3.1)	33.4 (0.8)	41.9 (5.5)	53.0 (11.7)	58.6 (14.8)	56.6 (13.7)	50.3 (10.2)	39.7 (4.3)	27.5 (−2.5)	20.9 (−6.2)	37.4 (3.0)
Daily mean °F (°C)	10.1 (−12.2)	9.3 (−12.6)	14.8 (−9.6)	20.6 (−6.3)	29.4 (−1.4)	39.7 (4.3)	45.6 (7.6)	44.0 (6.7)	37.7 (3.2)	27.7 (−2.4)	17.1 (−8.3)	10.4 (−12.0)	25.5 (−3.6)
Mean daily minimum °F (°C)	−0.6 (−18.1)	−1.4 (−18.6)	3.1 (−16.1)	7.9 (−13.4)	17.0 (−8.3)	26.4 (−3.1)	32.7 (0.4)	31.4 (−0.3)	25.1 (−3.8)	15.7 (−9.1)	6.8 (−14.0)	0.0 (−17.8)	13.7 (−10.2)
Average precipitation inches (mm)	3.42 (87)	3.35 (85)	3.95 (100)	4.33 (110)	2.83 (72)	1.37 (35)	2.33 (59)	2.44 (62)	2.26 (57)	2.59 (66)	3.13 (80)	3.01 (76)	35.01 (889)
Source: PRISM Climate Group

== Historical names ==
- Grizzly Mountain
- Grizzly Peak

== Other summits with same name ==
Grizzly Peak is not only the name of Colorado's highest thirteener, but the state has four other Grizzly Peaks plus one Grizzly Mountain on the list:

Rank	Mountain	Height	Range
54	Grizzly Peak	13,995 ft (4,266 m)	Sawatch Range
130	Grizzly Peak	13,738 ft (4,187 m)	San Juan Mountains
142	Grizzly Mountain	13,708 ft (4,178 m)	Sawatch Range
145	Grizzly Peak	13,700 ft (4,176 m)	San Juan Mountains
302	Grizzly Peak	13,427 ft (4,093 m)	Front Range
415	Grizzly Peak	13,281 ft (4,048 m)	Sawatch Range

== See also ==
- List of mountain peaks of North America
  - List of mountain peaks of the United States
    - List of mountain peaks of Colorado
