= Loveland Derby =

Amateur slalom ski race in Colorado, United States

The Loveland Derby is the last amateur slalom ski race of the year that happens every year at the Loveland Ski Area near Georgetown, Colorado. It is the largest and oldest ski race in North America and is put on by the Loveland Ski Club. This race is a two-day event that starts on Saturday morning around 9:30 and ends on Sunday afternoon around 4:00.

== Competitors ==
There are usually around 500-600 competitors that come from all over the country to compete. Some racers even come from as far away as Alaska and Florida to race. The competitors have to be at least 5 years old and there is no upper age limit for holders of a USSA ski-racing license. Most people come to this race because it has some of the lowest points of the year, which is good for getting a better seed for the next year. To help lower the points, varsity team members from the University of Colorado, the University of Denver, the University of New Mexico, and a few members from the US Ski Team compete.

== Courses ==
For this event, Loveland Valley is shut down and the race uses all of the main ski runs that Loveland Valley has to offer. Switchback is the name of the run where the children compete (U8, U10, U12 and U14 non scored). Twist is the name of the run where the men and women race (U14, U16, U18, U21 and SR, scored).

== Costumes ==
Although people come from all around the US for the chance at lowering their points, they also come for the fun. Since it is the last race of the year there is a lot of celebration that goes on. People dress up in costumes for the day and will even race in them. Costumes range from grass skirts, to superheroes, to cowboy attire to Mardi Gras beads. Many families and spectators will set tailgate BBQs and enjoy the Spring weather.

== Distinctions ==
There are many things that set Loveland Derby apart from other competitions. It is the biggest race with around 600 competitors while other races only have around 150 competitors. April 11-12, 2015 will mark the 55th year of The Derby, which makes it the oldest ski race in North America. Another thing that distinguishes the Loveland Derby is that it is raced so late in the ski season and there is such a festive atmosphere around the race.
