= Janet Bonnema =

American civil engineer and women's rights activist (1938–2008)

- Born: November 24, 1938; Denver, Colorado, US
- Died: May 9, 2008 (aged 69); Okeechobee, Florida
- Education: B.A., history, University of Colorado Boulder, 1960; M.S., civil engineering, University of Colorado Denver
- Occupation: Civil engineer
- Years active: 1970–2001
- Known for: Successfully sued the Colorado Department of Highways for sexual discrimination

Janet Petra Bonnema (November 24, 1938 – May 9, 2008) was an American civil engineer and women's rights activist. She was hired as an engineering technician for the Eisenhower Tunnel construction project in Colorado in 1970, but was barred from performing her work inside the tunnel due to the prevailing superstition that women who went underground in tunnels or mines brought bad luck, endangering the male workers. In 1972 she filed a $100,000 class action lawsuit against the Colorado Department of Highways for sexual discrimination. The state settled the case out of court and she was allowed to enter the tunnel, although she dressed inconspicuously. She became a symbol for equal rights in the workplace. She was posthumously inducted into the Colorado Women's Hall of Fame in 2012.

== Early life and education ==
Janet Petra Bonnema was born in Denver, Colorado, to Peter and Helen Bonnema. She had two sisters. Although she desired to study math and science, her guidance counselors at South High School discouraged her from pursuing these traditionally male-oriented subjects. She was similarly advised against majoring in engineering at the University of Colorado Boulder, and instead graduated with a bachelor's degree in history in 1960. During her university years, she captained the university ski team.

== Early career ==
After graduation, Bonnema began working as an engineering aide at Boeing Aircraft in Seattle. She left after two and a half years, seeing men who were less qualified than she receiving higher salaries and promotions. She spent the rest of the 1960s hitchhiking around the world, returning to Denver in 1970 having exhausted her savings.

=== Eisenhower Tunnel ===
In November 1970 Bonnema applied to the Colorado Department of Highways (CDOT) for a position as an engineering technician for the Eisenhower Tunnel project (then named the Straight Creek Tunnel project). She met the qualification criteria, passed the tests, and her application was accepted as being filed by a "Mr. Jamet Bonnema", as the state employer misspelled the name and was under the impression they were hiring a man. When Bonnema called to accept the job but question the salary being offered, she was told that "no women are allowed in the tunnel". Bonnema maintained that she could do the work, and two months later the department created a special engineering technician position for her that was office-based. While Bonnema was tasked with "recording measurements, collecting rock samples, and producing technical drawings" based on data found within the tunnels, her supervisors barred her from entering the tunnel itself due to her gender. A prevailing superstition, stemming from Welsh miners who came to work in Colorado in the mid-nineteenth century, held that women who descended underground into mines or tunnels would bring bad luck, putting the male workers in danger. This superstition applied to female workers, journalists, and visitors alike.

In July 1972, capping a year-long investigation, the United States Department of Transportation concluded that barring female workers from the tunnel amounted to sexual discrimination. When Bonnema's supervisors still refused to allow her entry, Bonnema filed a $100,000 class action lawsuit against the CDOT, citing Title VII of the Civil Rights Act of 1964. Before the case was heard, Colorado voters ratified the Equal Rights Amendment and the state opted to settle Bonnema's case out of court for $6,750.

Bonnema was escorted into the tunnel for the first time on November 9, 1972. Sixty-six workers temporarily walked off the job in protest, but only one quit permanently. On her second visit to the tunnel on November 14, Bonnema donned coveralls and a hard hat to disguise her identity. This time she and other workers were asked to perform measurements at the top of the tunnel, where Bonnema worked inside a concrete pipe; no one walked out on this visit. Bonnema continued to dress in coveralls during her subsequent work in the tunnel so as not to attract attention.

== Later career ==
Following the completion of the Eisenhower Tunnel, Bonnema pursued graduate studies at the University of Colorado Denver, earning her M.S. in civil engineering. In 1990 she moved to Okeechobee, Florida, where she worked as a civil engineer for the South Florida Water Management District until her retirement in 2001. She died of cancer on May 9, 2008, age 69, in Okeechobee.

== Awards and honors ==
Bonnema was posthumously inducted into the Colorado Women's Hall of Fame in 2012. In April 2011 Colorado State Senator Nancy Spence paid tribute to Bonnema in a speech on the senate floor.

== Personal life ==
Bonnema challenged gender stereotypes in her private life as well. She enjoyed skiing, motorcycling, rock climbing, parachuting, piloting, and traveling.

== Sources ==
- Howard, Jane (8 December 1972). "Janet Fights the Battle of Straight Creek Tunnel". LIFE. Vol. 73, no. 23.
- Lewis, Tom (2013). Divided Highways: Building the Interstate Highways, Transforming American Life. Cornell University Press. ISBN 978-0801467820.
