= Engelmann Peak =

Mountain in Colorado, United States

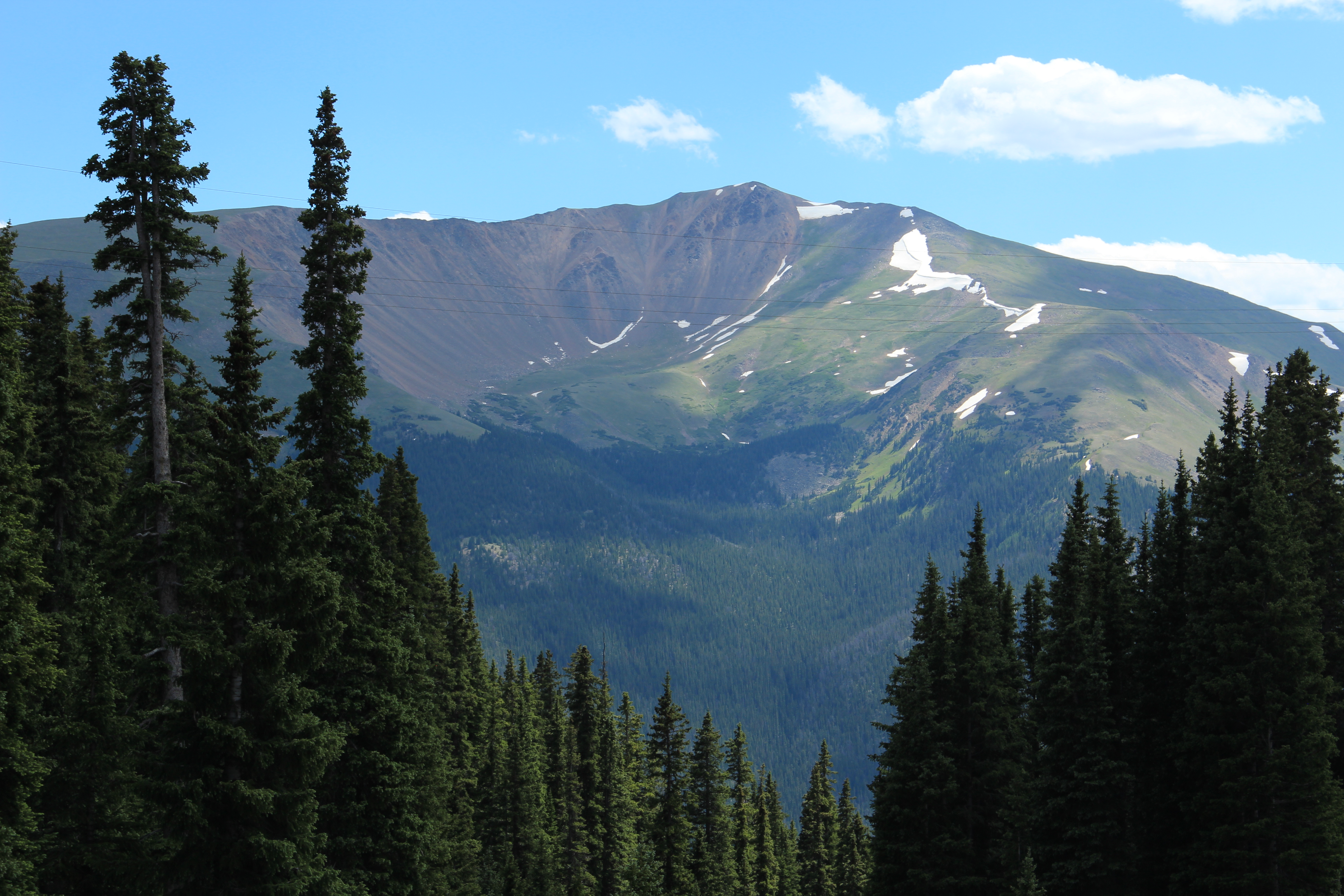
- Engelmann Peak viewed from Berthoud Pass

Highest point
- Elevation: 13,368 ft (4,075 m)
- Prominence: 542 ft (165 m)
- Parent peak: Bard Peak
- Isolation: 1.74 mi (2.80 km)
- Coordinates: 39°44′44″N 105°48′02″W

Naming
- Etymology: George Engelmann

Geography
- Location within Colorado
- Location: Clear Creek County, Colorado, United States
- Parent range: Front Range
- Topo map(s): USGS 7.5' topographic map Grays Peak, Colorado

Engelmann Peak is a high mountain summit in the Front Range of the Rocky Mountains of North America. The 13,368-foot (4,075 m) thirteener is located in Arapaho National Forest, 6.3 miles (10.2 km) west by south (bearing 261°) of the Town of Empire in Clear Creek County, Colorado, United States. The mountain was named in honor of the botanist George Engelmann.

The mountain is named for George Engelmann (1809–1884) a famous botanist responsible for describing and naming flora in the Rocky Mountains. He was born and educated in Germany and received his medical degree there. In 1832, he sailed to America. His financial backing had come from relatives in Germany who wanted him to invest in the lands of the new country so he explored areas in Illinois, Missouri and Arkansas.

== Historical names ==
- Cowles Mountain
- Engelmann Peak – 1912
- Englemann Peak

== See also ==
- List of Colorado mountain ranges
- List of Colorado mountain summits
  - List of Colorado fourteeners
  - List of Colorado 4000 meter prominent summits
  - List of the most prominent summits of Colorado
- List of Colorado county high points
