= Loveland Pass =

Mountain pass in Colorado, USA

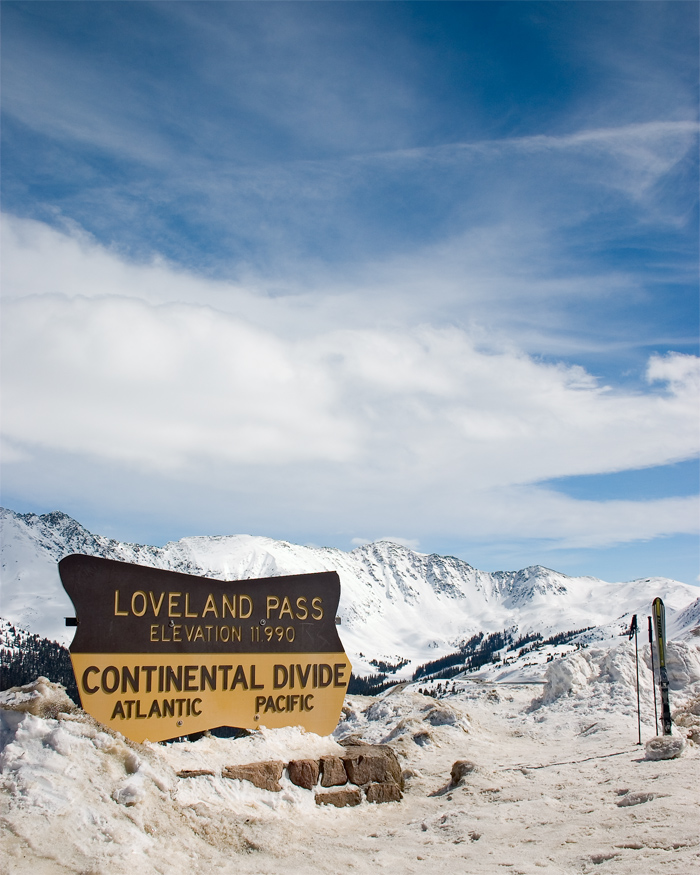
- Loveland Pass in late March 2005
- Interactive map of Loveland Pass
- Elevation: 11,990 feet (3,650 m)
- Traversed by: US 6

Third Approach
- Location: Clear Creek / Summit counties, Colorado, U.S.
- Range: Front Range
- Coordinates: 39°39′49″N 105°52′45″W
- Topo map: USGS Loveland Pass

Loveland Pass is a high mountain pass in north-central Colorado, at an elevation of 11,990 feet (3,655 m) above sea level in the Rocky Mountains of the Western United States.

== Background ==
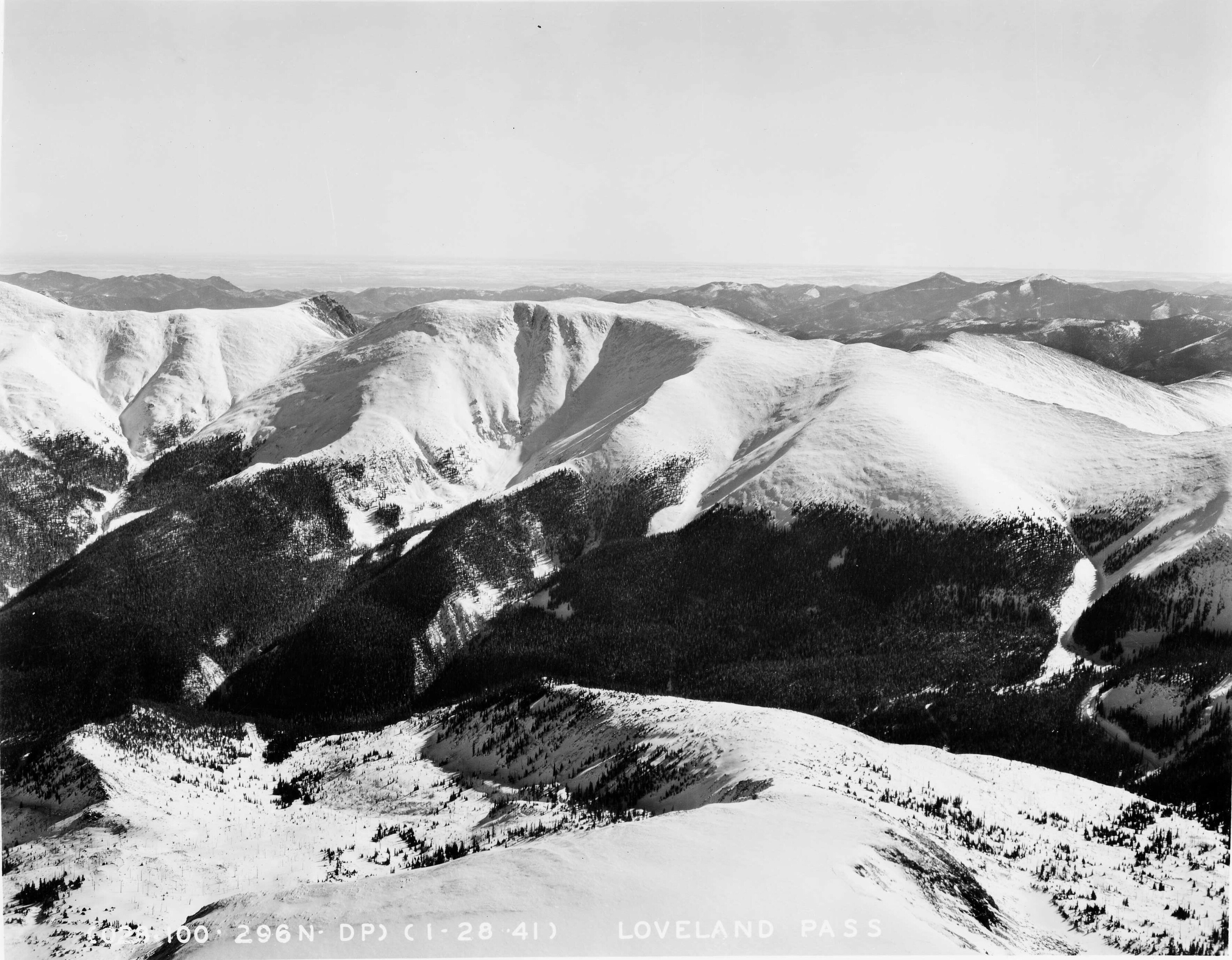
Loveland Pass, 1941

It is located on the Continental Divide in the Front Range, west of Denver on U.S. Highway 6 (US 6). The twisty road is considered to be especially treacherous during the winter months. A steep, steady 6.7% grade, along with numerous hairpin turns on either side, make it difficult to snowplow the road regularly.

The pass is named for William A.H. Loveland, the president of the Colorado Central Railroad and a resident of Golden during the late 19th century. The city of Loveland, in Larimer County near Fort Collins, is also named after him.

The first usable trail over the pass was completed in 1879. While W.A.H. Loveland had been instrumental in raising funds to build the road, work was largely completed by Union Pacific, a small number of Colorado Central Railroad employees, the Bakersville and Leadville Toll Road Company, and the High Line Toll Road Company. Surveying was done by E.L. Berthoud, assisted by T.J Milner (known for Berthoud Pass and Milner Pass). The pass was in disrepair by the early 1900s, but was never completely abandoned. Towards the end of 1929, a modern dirt road was nearly completed, and in 1930 the road was good enough for commercial use. Construction would continue, and in 1932 a grand opening was held. This was still a dirt road at that point. Paving would be completed in 1949-1950.

Loveland is the highest mountain pass in Colorado that regularly stays open during a snowy winter season. When the Eisenhower Tunnel opened in March 1973, it allowed motorists on Interstate 70 (I-70) to avoid crossing the pass directly. Trucks that cannot pass through the tunnel (those carrying hazardous materials and those over 13 feet 11 inches (4.24 m) in height) must still take US 6 across Loveland Pass, 800 vertical feet (240 m) above the tunnel. The same is true for bicyclists, pedestrians, and those drivers who wish to stop along the road to admire the scenery.

Loveland Ski Area is located north west of the pass, and Arapahoe Basin is on the south/southeast side. The pass itself is a popular destination for backcountry skiers. Occasionally during the winter, the pass road may be closed by a blizzard and all traffic must use the tunnel, even the normally forbidden vehicles carrying hazardous materials. In the event of less serious winter storms, chain restrictions are often imposed. At the Loveland Pass parking lot, visitors can access trails to the summits of Mount Sniktau and other nearby mountain peaks.

== Climate ==
Loveland Basin is in the Loveland Ski Area, near the summit of Loveland Pass. Loveland Pass has a subarctic climate (Köppen Dfc).

Climate data for Loveland Basin, Colorado, 1994–2020 normals: 11400ft (3475m)
Month	Jan	Feb	Mar	Apr	May	Jun	Jul	Aug	Sep	Oct	Nov	Dec	Year
Mean daily maximum °F (°C)	25.0 (−3.9)	27.4 (−2.6)	36.1 (2.3)	42.2 (5.7)	50.4 (10.2)	59.5 (15.3)	65.2 (18.4)	62.6 (17.0)	56.1 (13.4)	44.1 (6.7)	33.0 (0.6)	24.3 (−4.3)	43.8 (6.6)
Daily mean °F (°C)	16.4 (−8.7)	17.5 (−8.1)	24.5 (−4.2)	30.1 (−1.1)	38.7 (3.7)	47.6 (8.7)	53.1 (11.7)	51.2 (10.7)	45.2 (7.3)	34.3 (1.3)	24.2 (−4.3)	16.1 (−8.8)	33.2 (0.7)
Mean daily minimum °F (°C)	7.7 (−13.5)	7.6 (−13.6)	12.8 (−10.7)	18.0 (−7.8)	26.9 (−2.8)	35.8 (2.1)	41.1 (5.1)	39.9 (4.4)	34.2 (1.2)	24.6 (−4.1)	15.3 (−9.3)	7.8 (−13.4)	22.6 (−5.2)
Average precipitation inches (mm)	3.06 (78)	2.90 (74)	3.24 (82)	4.20 (107)	3.16 (80)	1.60 (41)	2.46 (62)	2.36 (60)	2.11 (54)	2.51 (64)	2.90 (74)	2.76 (70)	33.26 (846)
Source 1: XMACIS2
Source 2: NOAA (Precipitation 1991-2020)

== Incidents ==
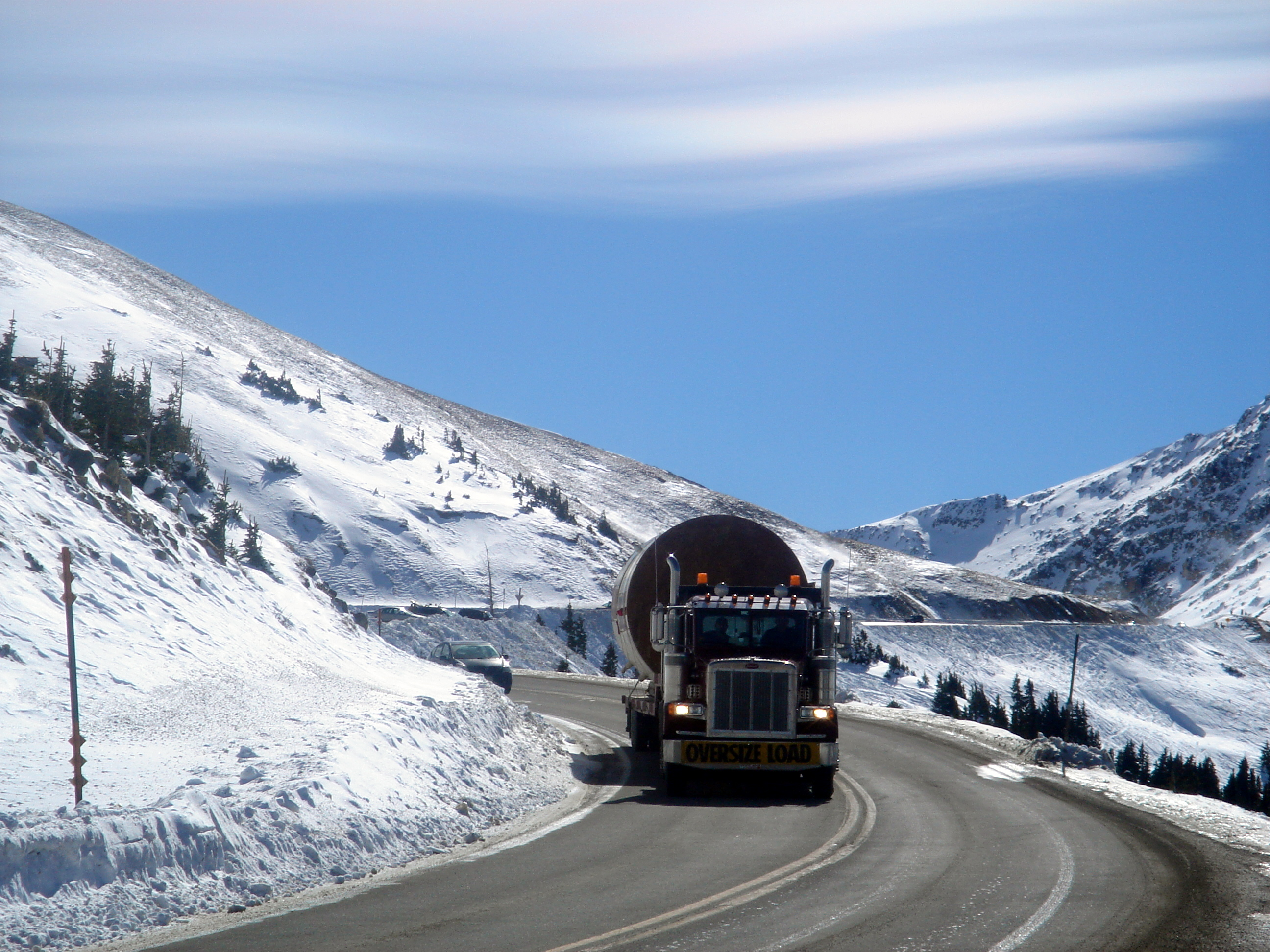
US 6 through Loveland Pass is the primary route for trucks that are prohibited from passing through the Eisenhower Tunnel.

=== Plane crash ===
On a clear Friday in early October 1970, a plane crash occurred about two miles (3 km) north of the summit, and only nine of the forty on board survived. The plane carried members of the Wichita State University football team, as well as coaches, administrators, and boosters. The cause was attributed to several pilot errors.

=== Avalanche ===
On April 20, 2013, an avalanche at Loveland Pass killed five snowboarders in the deadliest avalanche in Colorado since 1962. A sixth snowboarder involved in the incident survived, and was extracted by a search and rescue team.

== See also ==
- List of Colorado mountain passes
- List of Colorado mountain ranges
- List of Colorado mountain summits
