= Loveland Ski Area =

Snow skiing area in Colorado along the Continental Divide

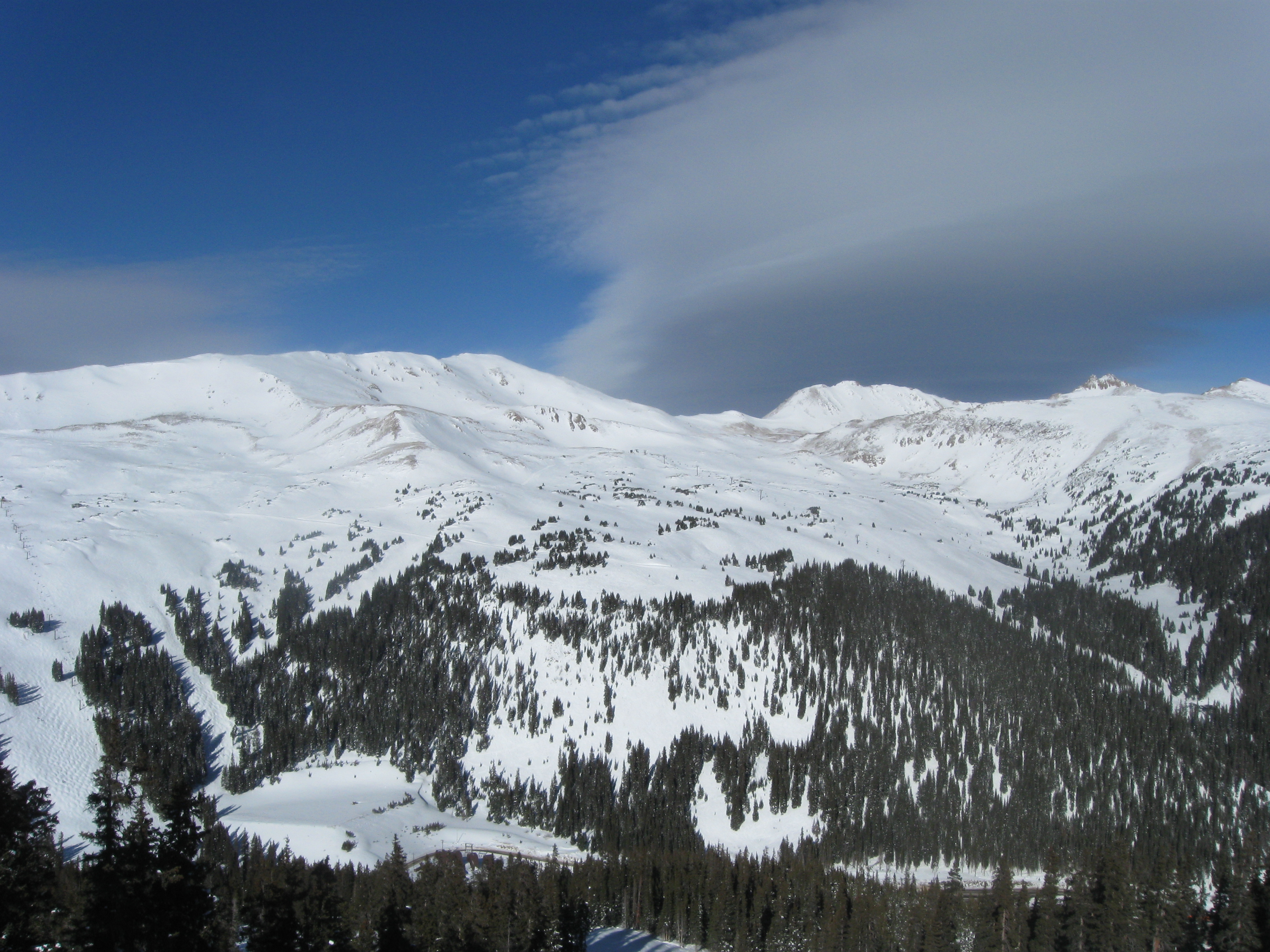
- The north view of Loveland Ski Area in 2008

- Location in Colorado Loveland Ski Area (the United States)
- Location: Arapahoe National Forest; Clear Creek County, Colorado, U.S.
- Nearest city: Silver Plume, 10 miles
- Coordinates: 39.680°N 105.897°W
- Vertical: 2,210 ft (674 m) (Basin); 850 ft (259 m) (Valley)
- Top elevation: 13,010 ft (3,965 m) (Basin); 11,250 ft (3,429 m) (Valley)
- Base elevation: 10,800 ft (3,292 m) (Basin); 10,400 ft (3,170 m) (Valley)
- Skiable area: 1,800 acres (7.3 km^{2})
- Trails: 94 total : 13% beginner : 41% intermediate : 46% advanced/expert
- Longest run: 2 miles (3 km)
- Lift system: 11 total: 1 high-speed quad chair; 3 quad chairs; 5 triple chairs; 2 surface lifts
- Lift capacity: 14,293/hour
- Terrain parks: 1: Love Park
- Snowfall: 422 inches (1,070 cm)
- Snowmaking: 240 acres (0.97 km^{2})
- Night skiing: none
- Website: skiloveland.com

Loveland Ski Area is a ski area in the western United States, located near the town of Georgetown, Colorado. Located at the eastern portal of the Eisenhower Tunnel, Loveland is within the Arapahoe National Forest. It is one of the closest ski areas to the Denver metropolitan area and Front Range corridor, making it popular with locals.

Loveland is one of only a handful of both independent, and family-owned, ski areas in operation. The company was long operated by Chet Upham of Mineral Wells, Texas, until his death in 2008, then by his widow Virginia Lee Upham until her death in 2015. The Upham family continues to own the ski area.

== Description ==
The Loveland Ski Area is the combination of two separate areas—Loveland Basin and Loveland Valley. The two areas, formerly connected by a double chairlift, are now served by bus. The area is one of Colorado's highest ski areas with a summit of 13,010 ft (3,965 m) and the third highest lift-served areas in North America at 12,697 ft (3,870 m). The ski area takes its name from adjacent Loveland Pass, which separates it from the nearby Arapahoe Basin ski area, on the west side of the Divide via U.S. Route 6.

The ski area is situated on the east side of the Eisenhower Tunnel, through which I-70 crosses the Continental Divide. Because of its lofty elevation, Loveland is typically one of the first ski areas to open; the earliest opening record on October 7, 2009. It also has the most "first" victories (five and one tie) in recent years. It is generally regarded as the closest major ski area open to the Denver market. Due to its lack of on-site lodging, Loveland often has shorter lift lines and less-expensive lift tickets, particularly midweek.

== Loveland Basin ==
Loveland Basin is the windiest of the two areas that compose Loveland Ski Area.

It contains most of the runs and lifts in the ski area, including all of the "Most Difficult" and "Expert" terrain. Seven of the nine chairlifts are located in the Basin. The bottom of the mountain contains the Basin Lodge, which houses the Loveland Grill, a deli, and two bars. There are also several cabins on the mountain, which contain both warming huts and food service. All have propane grills and heated insides. The historic E-Tow Cabin is one of these, which was the site of the original E-Tow Lift. Most cabins can be rented out.

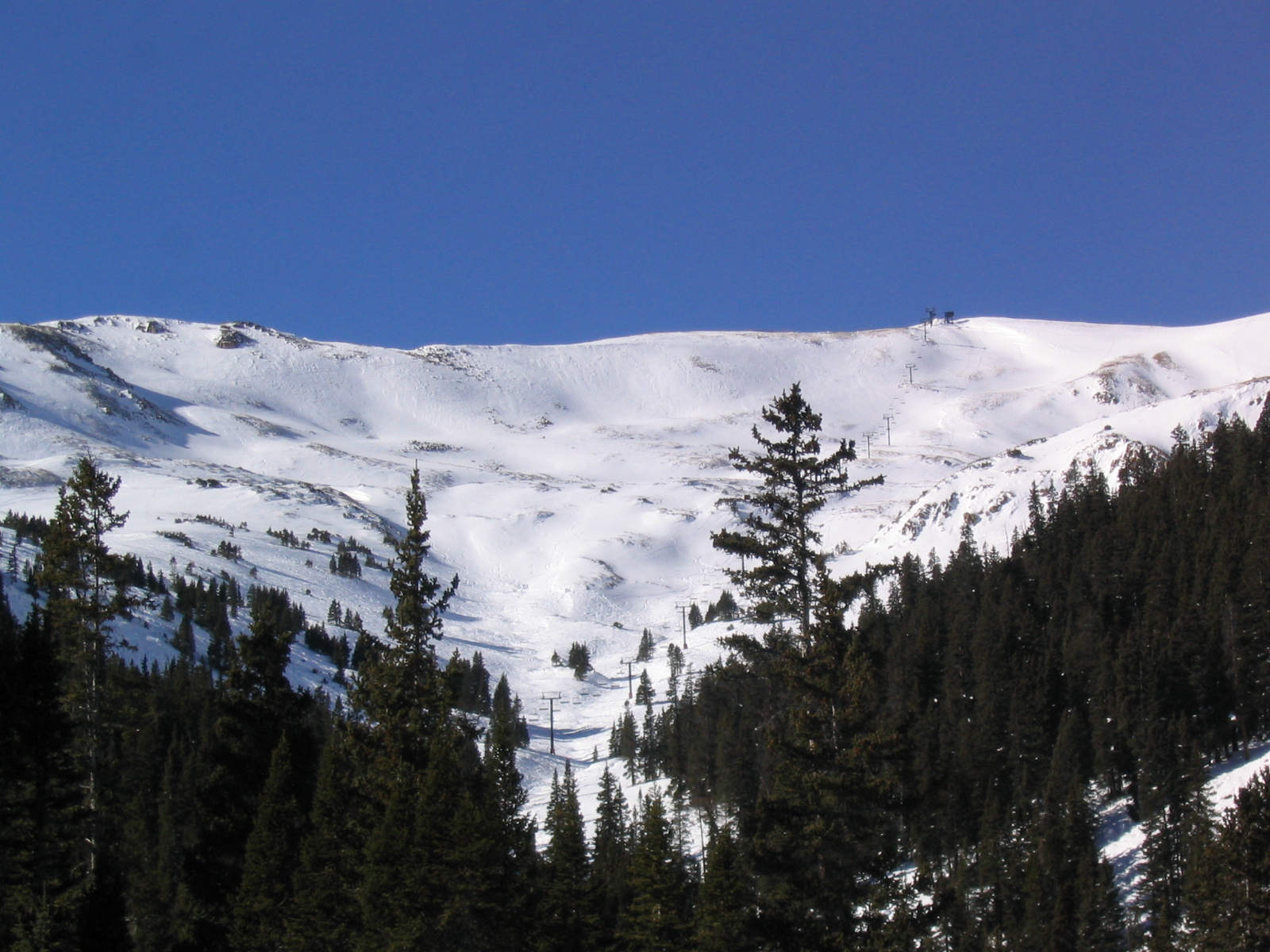
View of the ridge above Loveland Ski Area in 2006.

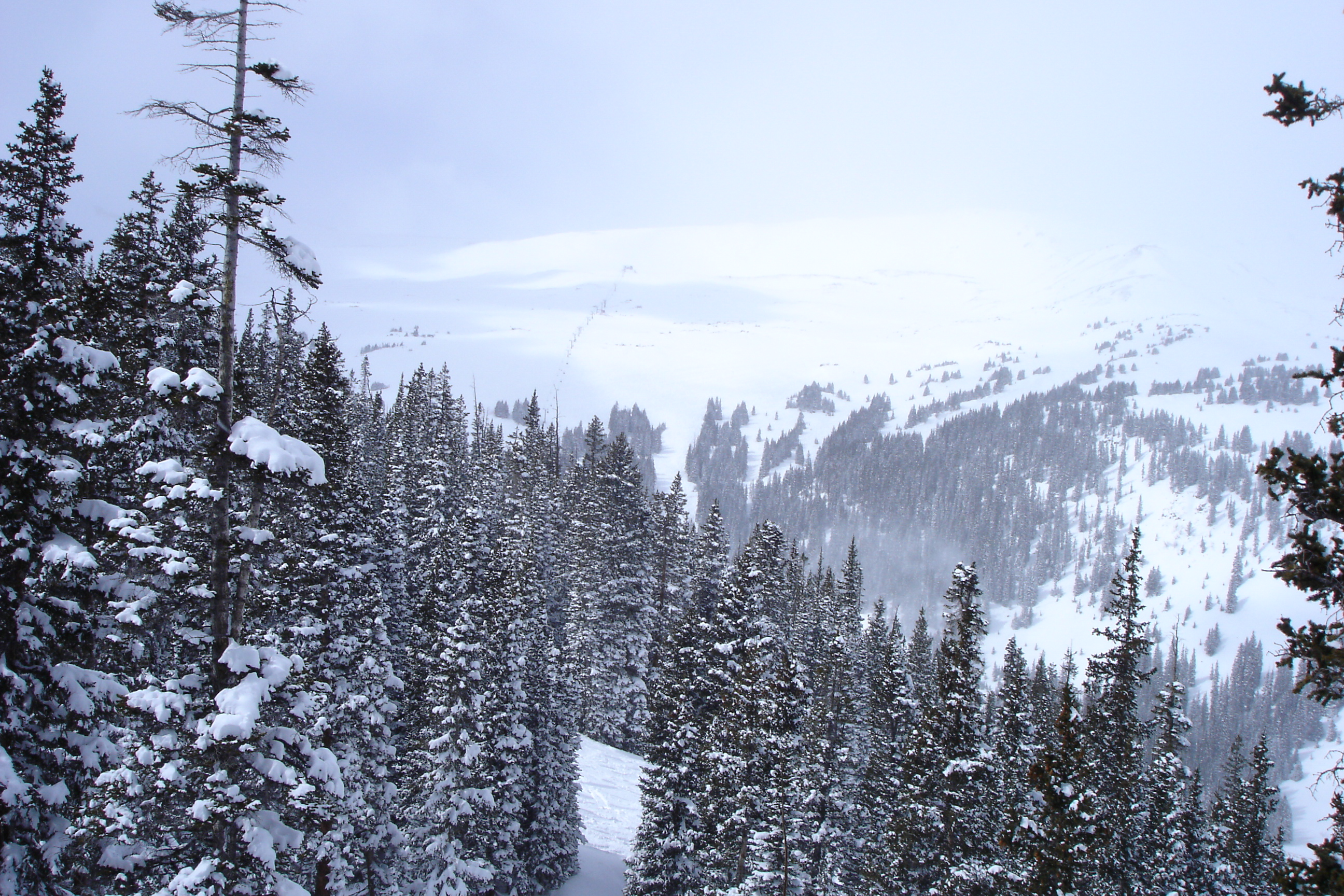
The view from Chair 1 at Loveland Ski Area in 2006.

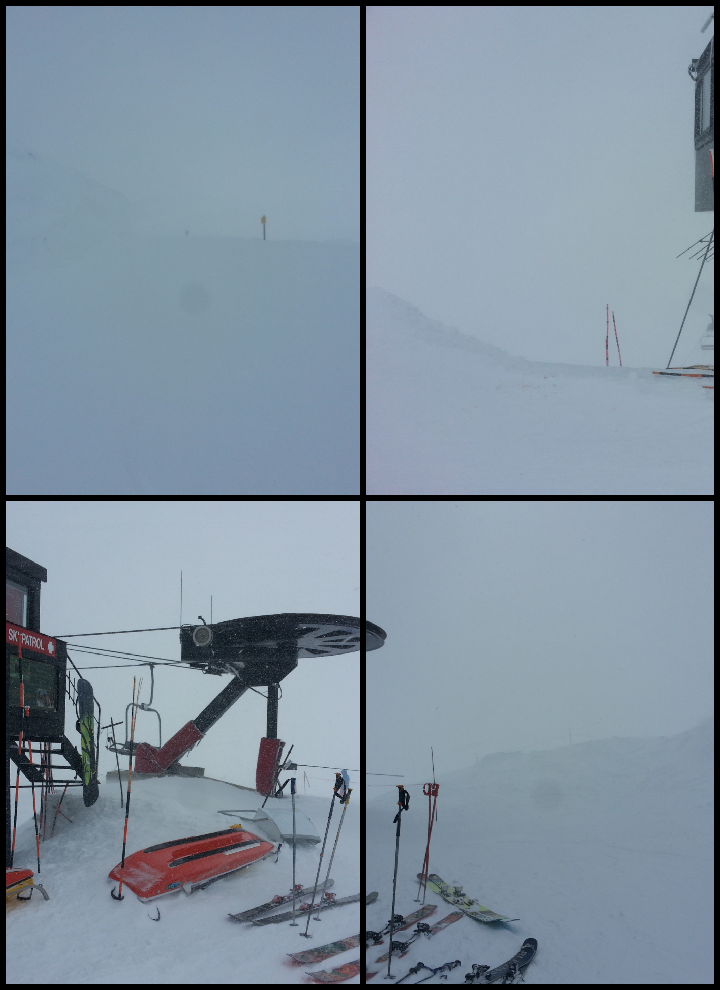
Views of The Ridge from the top of chair 9 at Loveland Basin in 2016.

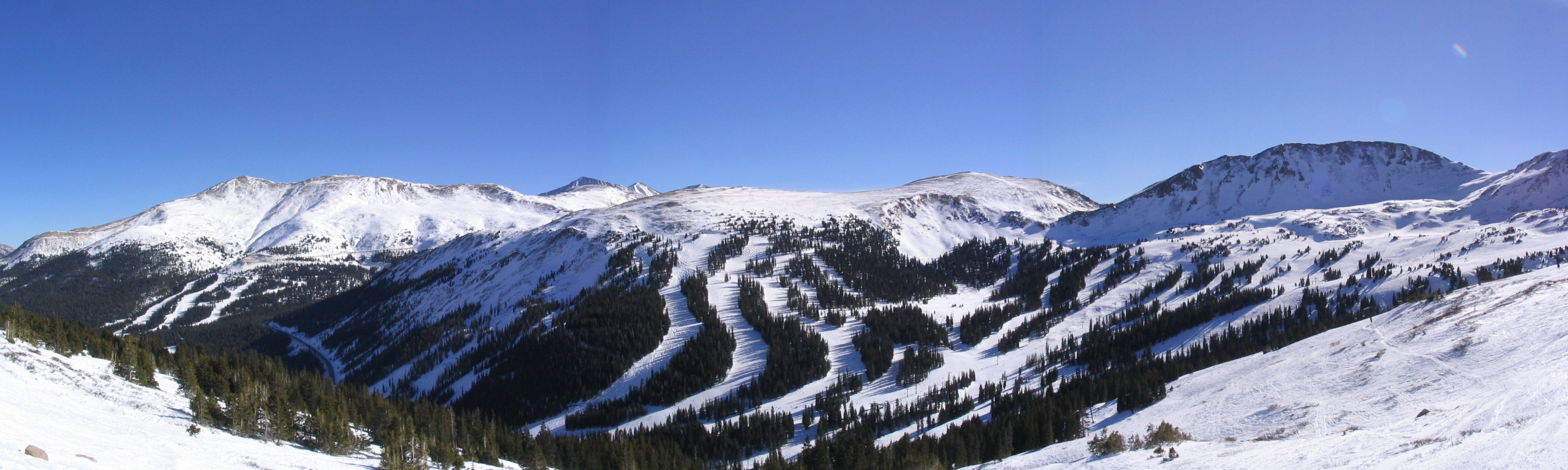
The View from above the Eisenhower Tunnel in 2006.

== Loveland Valley Ski Area ==
Loveland Valley is geared toward beginners. It has two chair lifts, Chair 3, which serves its intermediate and racing runs, and Chair 7, which exclusively serves its beginner slopes, All Smiles and Take Off. Generally, its slopes are gentler which suits itself well to be the home of Loveland's Ski and Ride School.

Loveland Valley has a lodge building that consists of a cafeteria, bar, the Ski and Ride School office, a ticket office, a rental shop, lockers, hygiene services and a retail area.

Loveland Race Club is also located within the Valley. The Club practices and races at the upper end of the Valley's Switchback Trail. Practices are held every afternoon and races are held on the weekend. The club also has a lodge just below the base of Chair 3.

An annual ski race, the Loveland Derby, is held annually at Loveland Valley and is put on by the Loveland Ski Club.

== Ski patrol ==
Loveland has a combination volunteer and paid patrol that services the mountain. It is one of the few patrols in the Rocky Mountain Division that has an active young adult program.

In 2024, Loveland Ski Patrol became the latest to join the United Professional Ski Patrols of America union, part of the Communication Workers of America.

== History ==
Loveland was first opened as a ski area in 1936 by J.C. Blickensderfer, who installed a portable tow rope in what is now Loveland Basin. The following year, operations were taken over by Al Bennett who used a modified Model T to power the tow. In 1941 the area was named Loveland Ski Tow Inc. and through the 1940s the area grew to boast 4 tows.

Many changes occurred during the 1950s and 1960s which made the area much more accessible. In 1955, Loveland Ski Tow Inc. was purchased by stockholders and Pete Seibert, the future co-founder of the Vail Ski Resort, was hired as General Manager. Loveland's first chairlift, Lift 1, opened in 1955. Lift 2 was added in 1957, as was the Mambo Café, which was situated near the base of what is now Lift 4. Lifts 3 and 4 were also constructed during the 1960s. Loveland saw the construction of the Eisenhower Tunnel beginning in 1968, with tunnel openings in 1973 and 1979. The owner Upham and Loveland general manager Otto Werlin conceived the idea of artificial snow from observing the pumps and compressors being used to dig the tunnel. The 1970s decade also saw the installation of two chairlifts: Lift 5, connecting Loveland Basin with Loveland Valley, and Lift 6, replacing a rope-tow south of Lift 2.

The 1980s and 1990s brought about several upgrades to existing equipment. In 1984, snowmaking capabilities were installed. In 1985, Lift 2 was upgraded to a triple chairlift. The late 1980s also saw the construction of expanded lodge facilities at the Valley area. Lift 8, a fixed-grip quad, was installed to access intermediate and advanced terrain in 1990. In 1995, the Basin's lodge was remodeled and expanded. Lift 3 was replaced in 1996 with a fixed-grip quad. 1998 saw the installation of another fixed-grip quad, Lift 9, which provided access to "The Ridge". Prior to Breckenridge Ski Resort's construction of the Imperial Express SuperChair in 2005, Lift 9 was the highest offloading chairlift in North America.

Over a span of 14 years, from 2011 to 2025, a significant modernization of the ski area's chairlifts took place:

- In 2011, the aging Lift 4 was replaced with a triple chairlift.
- For 2015, Lift 2 was split in half, and it was shortened to end at its mid-station. The upper section of the lift was replaced with a new fixed-grip triple named Ptarmigan, running in a similar alignment to the former High 90 Poma platter.
- In 2018, Lift 1, a fixed-grip triple built in 1981, was replaced by a Leitner-Poma high-speed quad, named "Chet's Dream".
- In 2022, Lift 6 was upgraded to a Leitner-Poma triple, replacing a fixed-grip double installed in 1977.
- In 2025, Lift 7, a fixed-grip double built in 1982 and located in Loveland Valley, was replaced by a Leitner-Poma quad (to be operated as a triple) to aid the Loveland Ski and Ride School.

=== Proposed Olympic venue ===
When the International Olympic Committee awarded the 1976 Winter Olympics to Denver in May 1970, the local organizers' proposal included the development of Mount Sniktau as the primary venue for alpine ski racing for downhill and giant slalom, with slalom at Loveland Ski Area. By early 1972, it was decided to move the alpine events to Vail because the proposals did not meet the Olympic standards. After the Colorado voters, in November, rejected public funding for the Olympics, it was relocated to Innsbruck, Austria.

=== Plane crash ===
On a clear Friday afternoon in early October 1970, a chartered airplane carrying half of the Wichita State University football team crashed just northeast of the ski area. A total of forty were on board and only nine survived; the cause was attributed to several pilot errors. First responders were Loveland Ski Patrol, motorists (I-70/US-6) and construction workers at the Eisenhower Tunnel.
