= Grizzly Peak (Mariposa County, California) =

Mountain in California, United States

- Location within California Location within the United States

Highest point
- Elevation: 6,222 ft (1,896 m) NGVD 29
- Prominence: 182 ft (55 m)
- Coordinates: 37°43′47″N 119°33′03″W

Geography
- Location: Yosemite National Park; Mariposa County, California, U.S.
- Parent range: Sierra Nevada
- Topo map: USGS Half Dome

Climbing
- First ascent: 1885 by Charles A. Bailey
- Easiest route: Exposed scramble, class 3

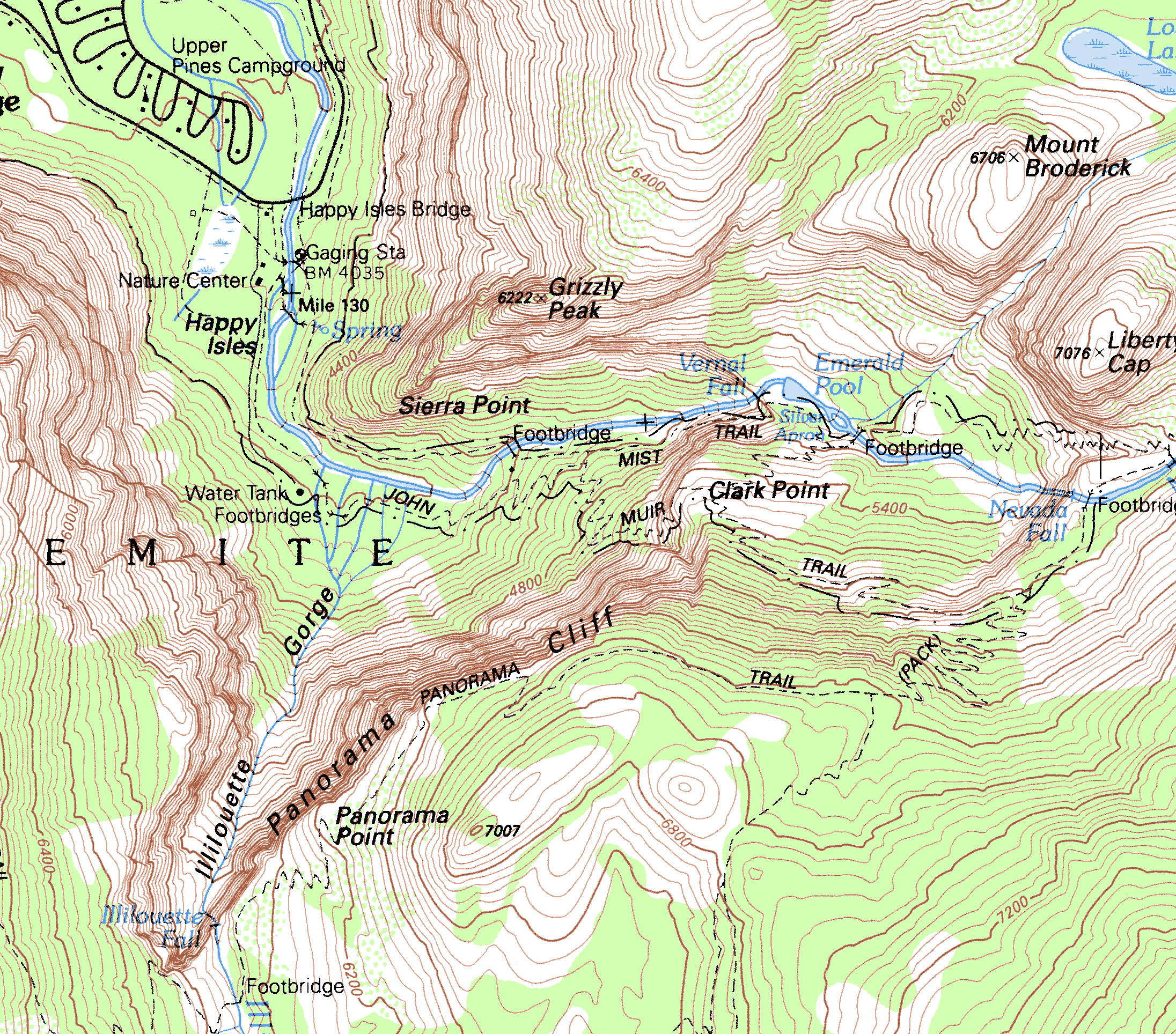
Map showing Grizzly Peak

Grizzly Peak in Yosemite Valley is a promontory on the southwest wall below the popular Half Dome. It can be seen on the hike to Vernal Fall and Nevada Fall, from northeastern Glacier Point, and various other locations in the Yosemite Valley. The top is not accessible by any trail, although rock climbers frequent the peak.
