= Grizzly Peak (Gunnison County, Colorado) =

Mountain in the state of Colorado

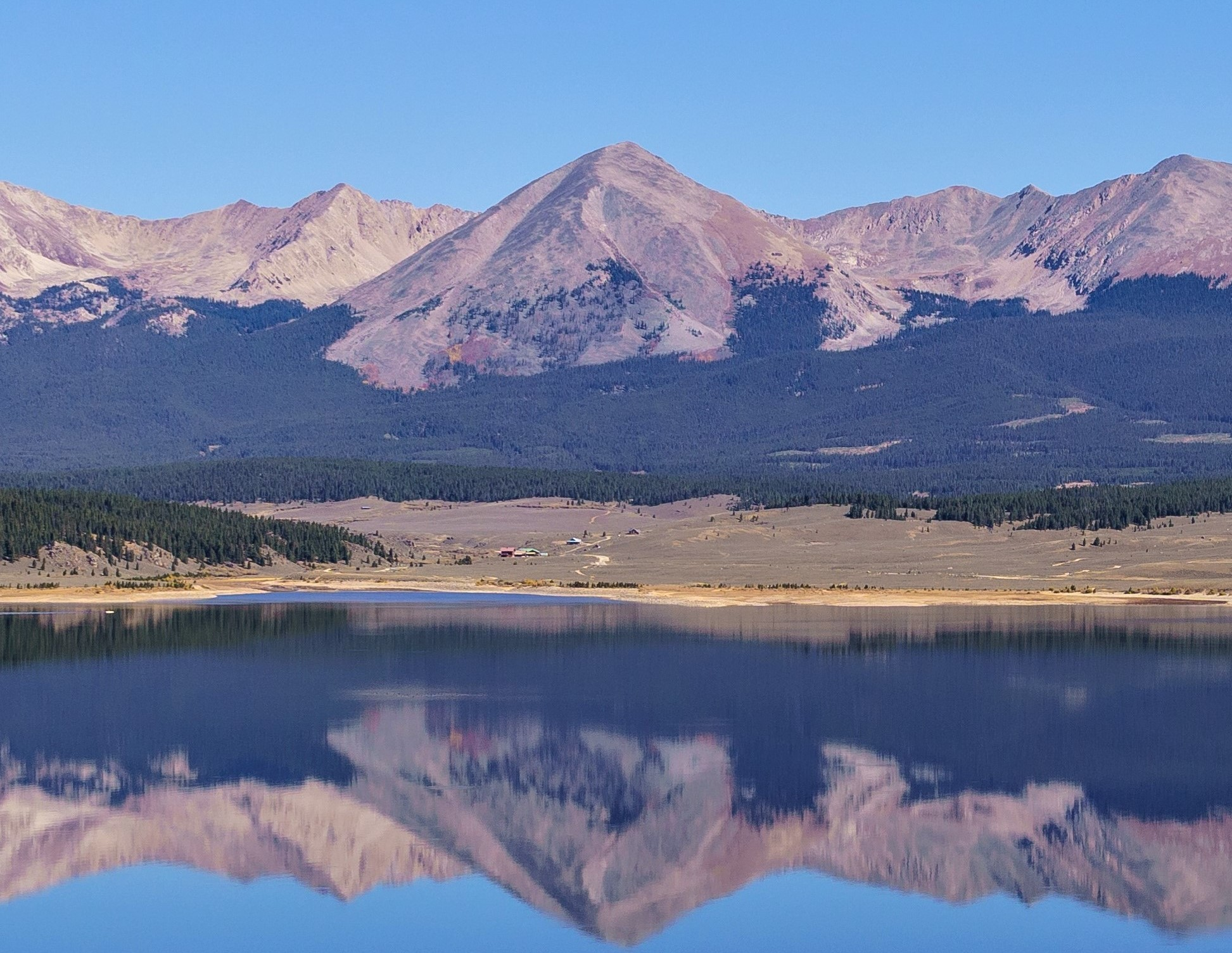
- South aspect, centered

Highest point
- Elevation: 13,309 ft (4,057 m)
- Prominence: 604 ft (184 m)
- Parent peak: Jenkins Mountain (13,440 ft)
- Isolation: 1.94 mi (3.12 km)
- Coordinates: 38°56′33″N 106°31′20″W

Naming
- Etymology: Grizzly

Geography
- Location within Colorado Location within the United States
- Country: United States
- State: Colorado
- County: Gunnison
- Protected area: Collegiate Peaks Wilderness
- Parent range: Rocky Mountains; Sawatch Range; Collegiate Peaks
- Topo map: USGS Pieplant

Climbing
- Easiest route: class 2 hiking

Grizzly Peak is a 13,309-foot-elevation (4,057-meter) mountain summit in Gunnison County, Colorado, United States.

== Description ==
Grizzly Peak is set one-half mile west of the Continental Divide in the Collegiate Peaks which are a subrange of the Sawatch Range. The mountain ranks as the 34th-highest peak in Gunnison County. The peak is located seven miles (11 km) north-northeast of Taylor Park Reservoir in the Collegiate Peaks Wilderness, on land managed by Gunnison National Forest. Precipitation runoff from the mountain's slopes drains into tributaries of the Taylor River, four miles to the southwest. Topographic relief is significant as the summit rises 2,500 feet (762 m) in one mile (1.6 km) along the south slope. The American Discovery Trail traverses the lower southern slope of the peak as it crosses the Continental Divide near Lake Ann and enters Taylor Park. The mountain's toponym has been officially adopted by the United States Board on Geographic Names. There are four other summits in Colorado which are also named Grizzly Peak, the highest of which is 8.5 miles (13.7 km) to the north-northwest and also in the Collegiate Peaks, as well as 18 others among several western states.

== Climate ==
According to the Köppen climate classification system, Grizzly Peak is located in an alpine subarctic climate zone with cold, snowy winters, and cool to warm summers. Due to its altitude, it receives precipitation all year, as snow in winter and as thunderstorms in summer, with a dry period in late spring. Climbers can expect afternoon rain, hail, and lightning from the seasonal monsoon in late July and August.

== Gallery ==
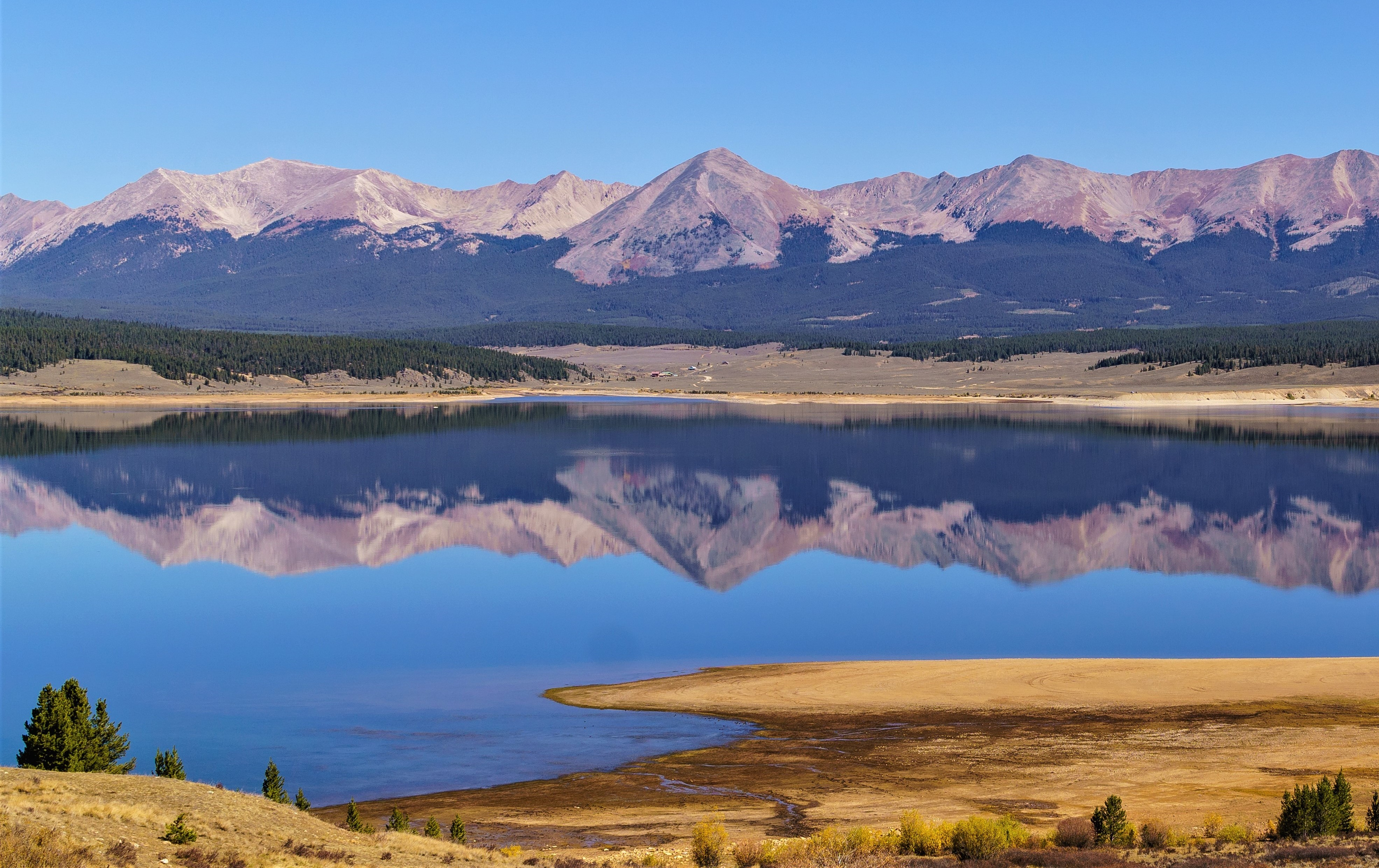
Looking north from Taylor Park Reservoir toward the Continental Divide with Grizzly Peak centered and Jenkins Mountain to the left.

== See also ==
- Grizzly Peak (disambiguation)
- Thirteener
