= Grizzly Peak (Dolores/San Juan Counties, Colorado) =

Mountain in the state of Colorado

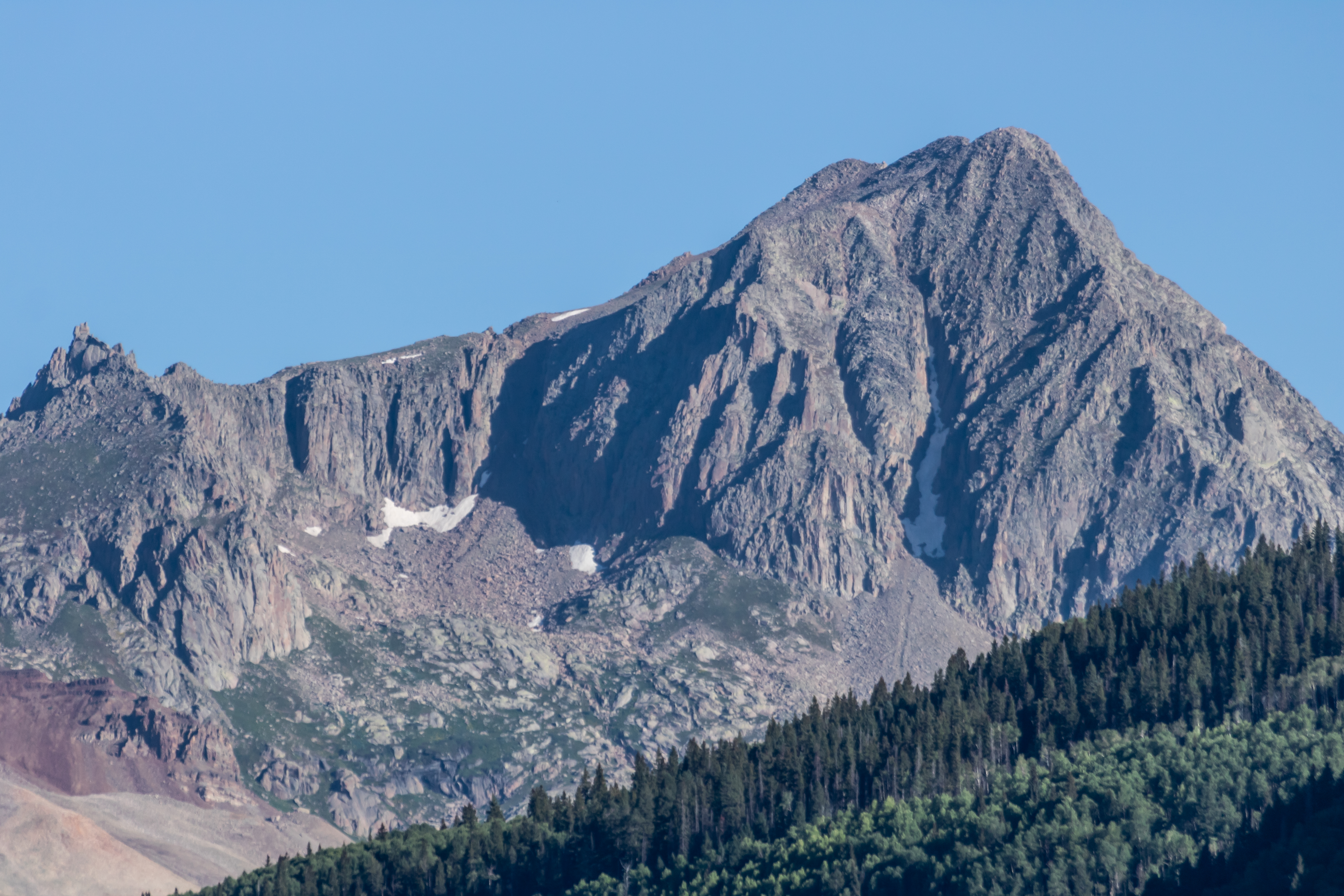
- Southeast aspect

Highest point
- Elevation: 13,738 ft (4,187 m)
- Prominence: 816 ft (249 m)
- Parent peak: San Miguel Peak (13,756 ft)
- Isolation: 1.60 mi (2.57 km)
- Coordinates: 37°45′21″N 107°51′43″W

Naming
- Etymology: Grizzly

Geography
- Location within Colorado Location within the United States
- Country: United States
- State: Colorado
- County: Dolores / San Juan
- Protected area: San Juan National Forest
- Parent range: Rocky Mountains; San Juan Mountains
- Topo map: USGS Ophir

Climbing
- Easiest route: class 2 hiking

Grizzly Peak is a 13,738-foot-elevation (4,187-meter) mountain summit on the boundary shared by Dolores County and San Juan County, in Colorado, United States.

== Description ==
Grizzly Peak is set 17 miles (27 km) west of the Continental Divide in the San Juan Mountains which are a subrange of the Rocky Mountains. The peak is located 33 miles (53 km) north of Durango and 4.35 miles (7.00 km) northwest of Engineer Mountain, on land managed by San Juan National Forest. Grizzly ranks as the fourth-highest peak in Dolores County and 126th-highest in Colorado. Precipitation runoff from the mountain's west slope drains to the Dolores River via Twin Creek, and the east slope drains into Cascade Creek which is a tributary of the Animas River. Topographic relief is significant as the summit rises nearly 2,600 feet (792 m) above Cascade Creek in 0.65 mile (1.05 km). The mountain's toponym has been officially adopted by the United States Board on Geographic Names, and has been printed in publications since 1899. There are four other summits in Colorado which are also named Grizzly Peak, as well as 18 others among several western states.

== Climate ==
According to the Köppen climate classification system, Grizzly Peak is located in an alpine subarctic climate zone with cold, snowy winters, and cool to warm summers. Due to its altitude, it receives precipitation all year, as snow in winter and as thunderstorms in summer, with a dry period in late spring. Climbers can expect afternoon rain, hail, and lightning from the seasonal monsoon in late July and August.

== See also ==
- Grizzly Peak (disambiguation)
- Thirteener

== Gallery ==
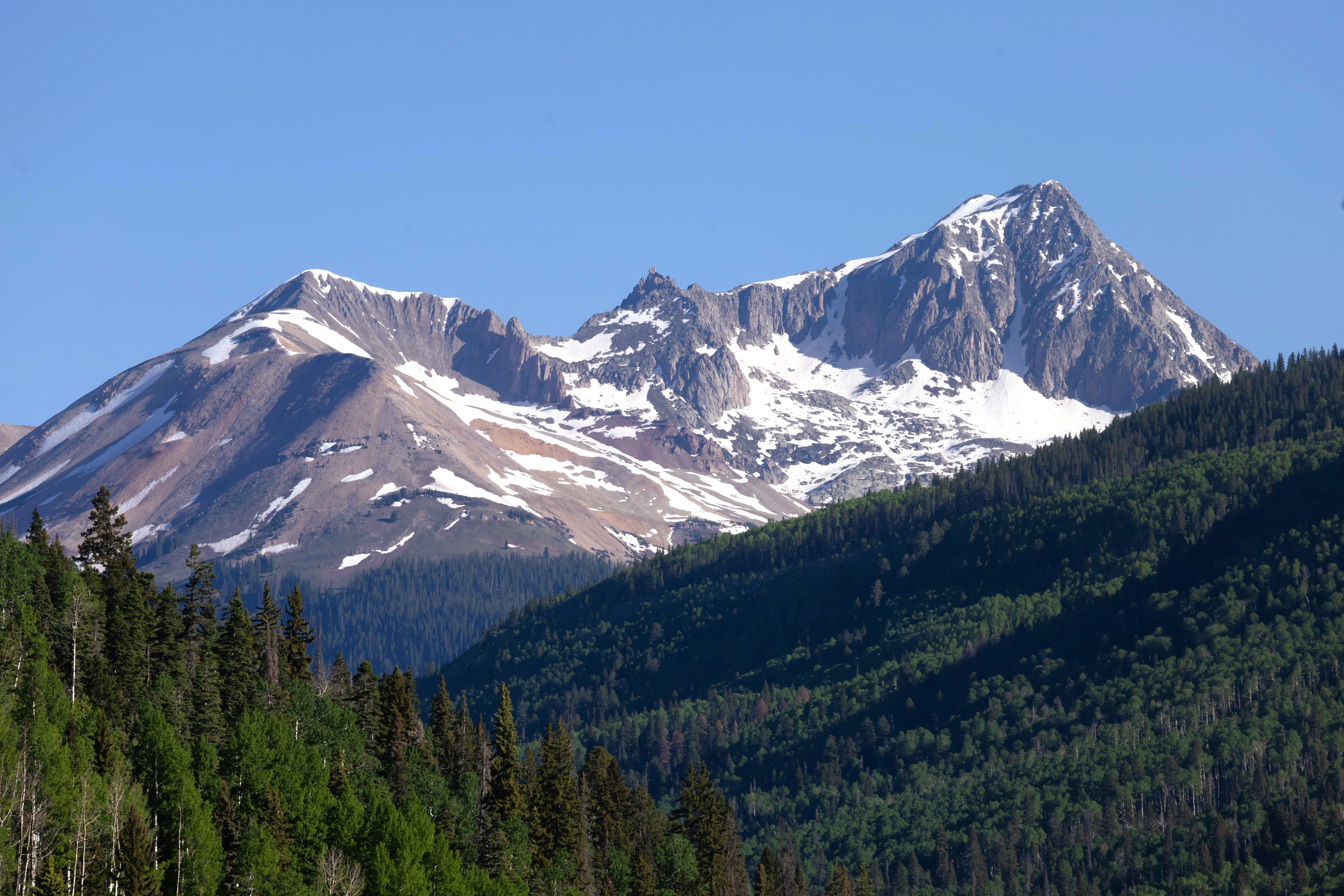
Grizzly Peak from the southeast

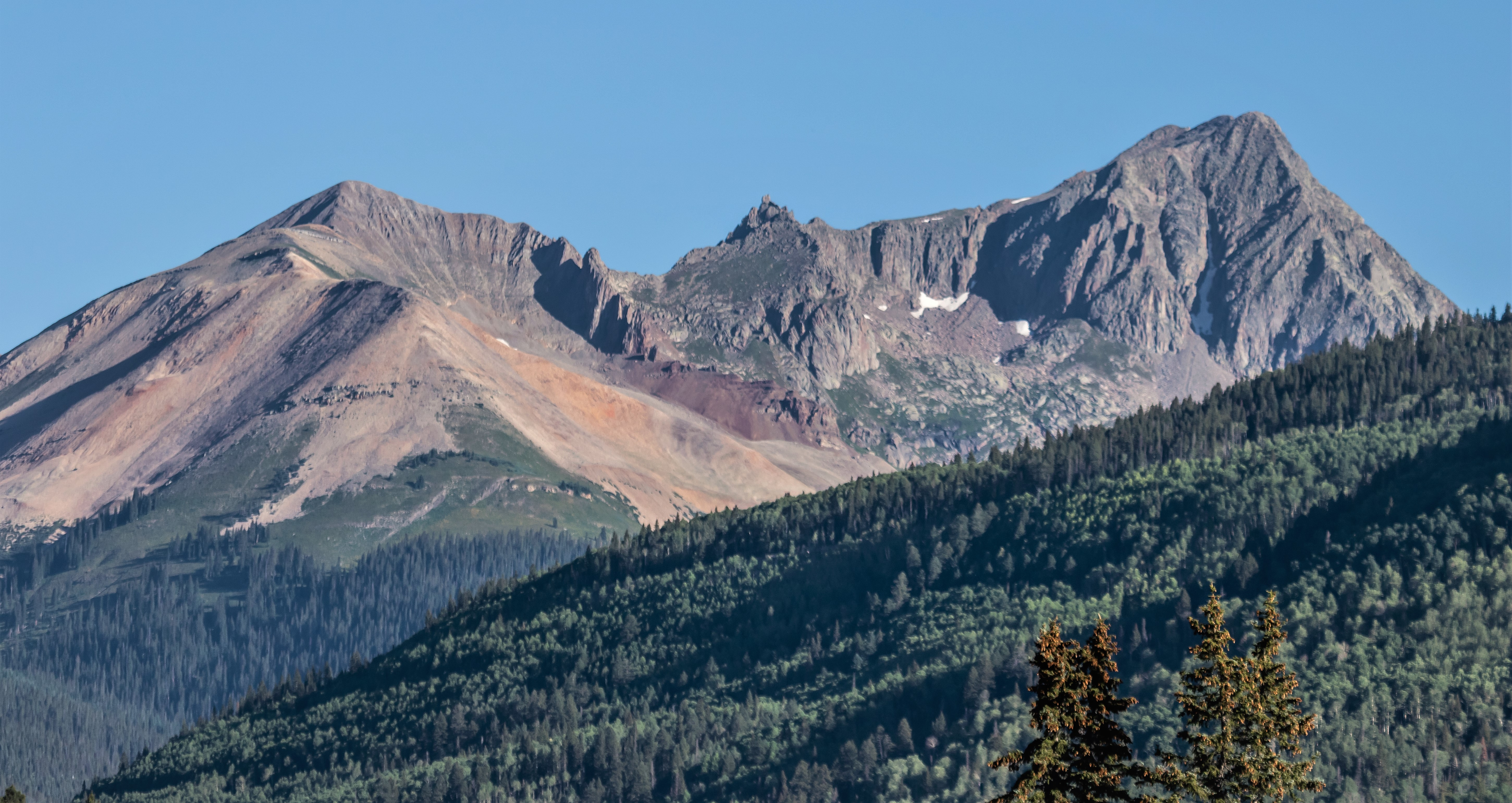
Grizzly Peak from the southeast
