= Eisenhower Tunnel =

Vehicular tunnel in Colorado

Eisenhower–Johnson Memorial Tunnel
- Eisenhower Tunnel
- Interactive map of Eisenhower–Johnson; Memorial Tunnel

Overview
- Location: Approx. 60 miles (100 km) west of Denver, Colorado
- Coordinates: 39.6785°N 105.9200°W
- Route: I-70
- Crosses: Continental Divide

Operation
- Opened: 1973 Eisenhower (westbound); 1979 Johnson (eastbound)
- Operator: Colorado Department of Transportation
- Character: Twin-bore tunnel
- Vehicles per day: 32,260 vehicles (2007)

Technical
- Length: 1.693 mi (2.72 km) westbound 1.697 mi (2.73 km) eastbound
- Max elevation: 11,158 ft (3,401 m) west portal
- Min elevation: 11,013 ft (3,357 m) east portal
- Tunnel clearance: 13.92 ft (4.24 m)
- Width: 40 ft (12.2 m) each
- Grade: 1.64%

The Eisenhower Tunnel, officially the Eisenhower–Edwin C. Johnson Memorial Tunnel, is a dual-bore, four-lane vehicular tunnel in the western United States, approximately 60 miles (97 km) west of Denver, Colorado. The tunnel carries Interstate 70 (I-70) under the Continental Divide in the Rocky Mountains. With a maximum elevation of 11,158 feet (3,401 m) above sea level, it is one of the highest vehicular tunnels in the world. The tunnel is the longest mountain tunnel and highest point on the Interstate Highway System. Opened in 1973, the westbound bore is named after Dwight D. Eisenhower, the U.S. President for whom the Interstate system is also named. The eastbound bore was completed in 1979 and is named for Edwin C. Johnson, a Colorado governor and U.S. Senator who lobbied for an Interstate Highway to be built across Colorado.

== Description ==
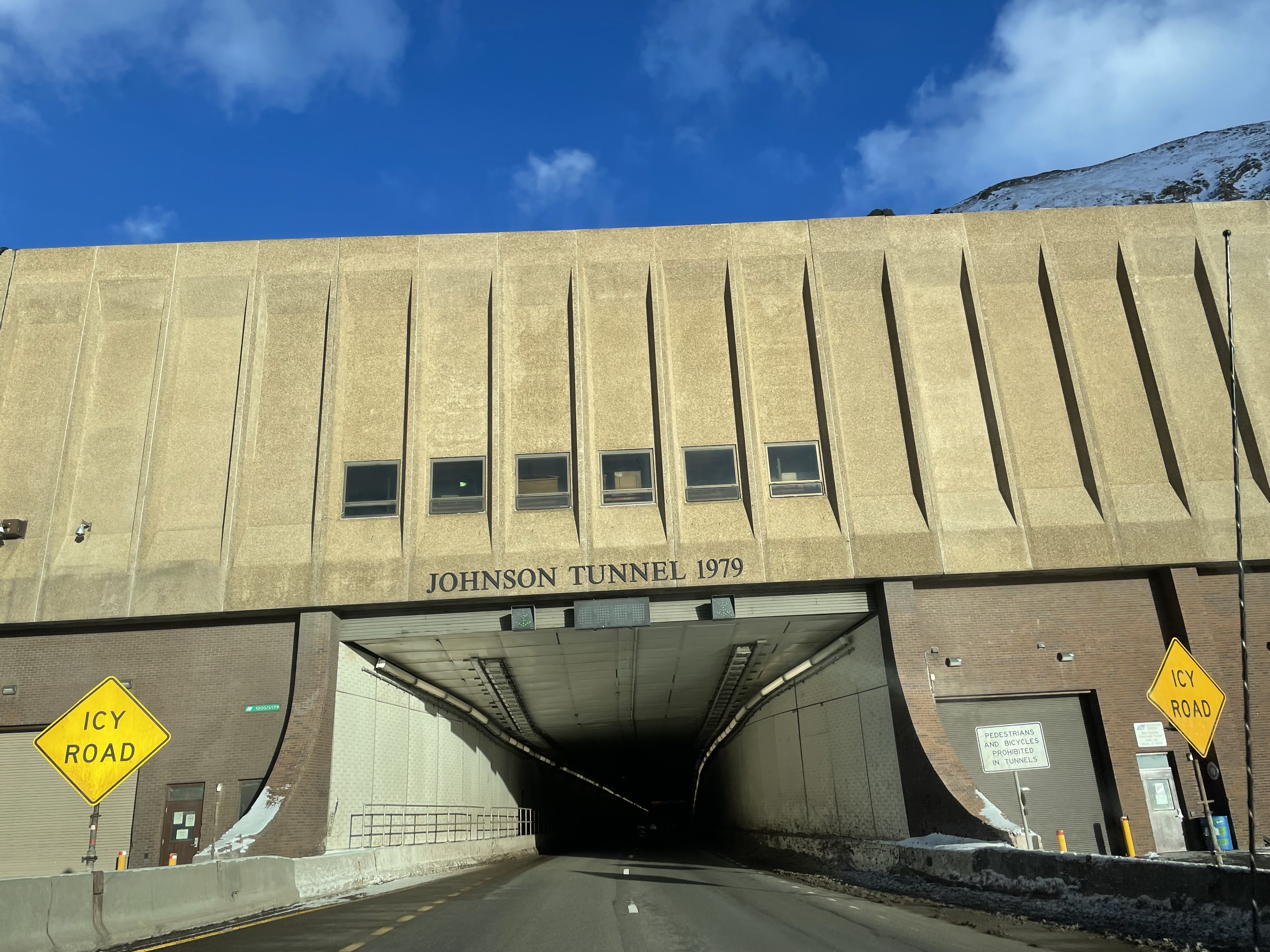
Eastern portal of the Johnson Tunnel in 2022

The Eisenhower Memorial Bore (westbound tunnel) is 1.693 miles (2.72 km) long, while the Edwin C. Johnson Memorial Bore (eastbound tunnel) is 1.697 miles (2.73 km) long. The tunnels are sloped with a 1.64% grade, with an elevation of 11,013 feet (3,357 m) at the east portal and 11,158 feet (3,401 m) at the west portal.

At its dedication, the Eisenhower Tunnel was the highest vehicular tunnel in the world. While it remains the highest vehicular tunnel in the US, and longest mountain tunnel and highest point on the Interstate Highway System, higher tunnels have since been constructed elsewhere, such as the Fenghuoshan Tunnel, a rail tunnel in China.

The tunnel bores measure 48 ft × 40 ft (15 m × 12 m). The traveled portion is a rectangular shape just over 16 ft (4.9 m) tall. The space above is used for forced air ventilation while the space below the roadway is used for water transport and drainage.

As of March 2023, more than 434 million vehicles had passed through the tunnel. This figure includes a significant number of visitors to Colorado's ski resorts.

=== Height restriction ===
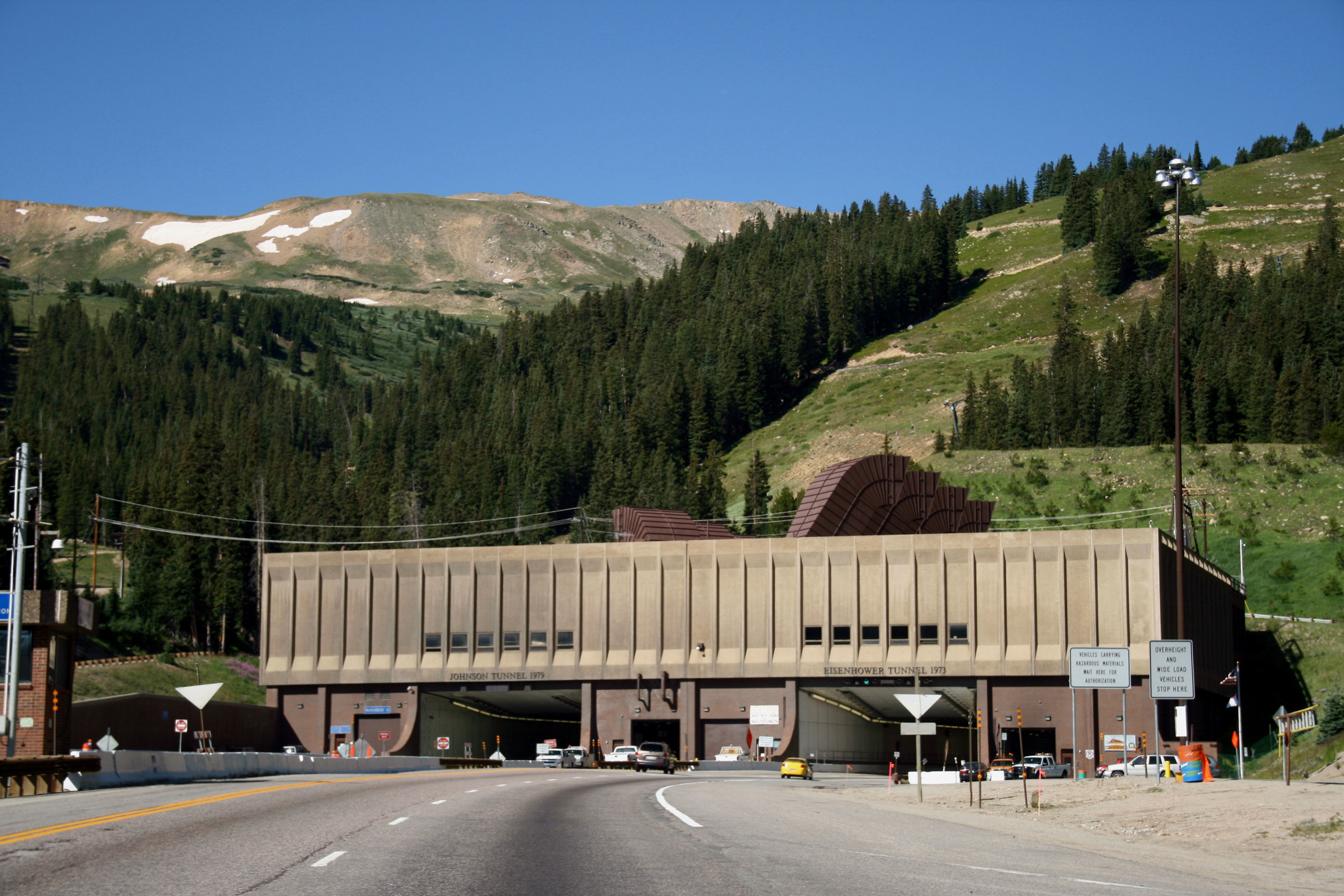
Eastern portal of the tunnel in 2008

Due to additional height restrictions from variable-message signs and lighting systems, the original posted clearance of the tunnels was 13 ft 6 in (4.11 m). The trucking industry lobbied the Colorado Department of Transportation (CDOT) to increase the vertical clearance. In 2007, the tunnel was retrofitted with lower-profile lighting and signs, increasing its clearance by 5 in (13 cm) to 13 ft 11 in (4.24 m).

A height detector near each tunnel entrance sounds a siren and turns traffic signals red, stopping all traffic, if an overheight vehicle attempts to enter the tunnel. The entrance will remain closed until the vehicle is removed from the freeway, which can cause severe delays. CDOT noted that prior to the retrofit, about 20,000 vehicles per year tripped the alarm. The trucking industry argued that many of these trucks were under the height requirement but tripped the alarm due to their air suspensions (which can be lowered during their journey through the tunnel) or due to snow and ice atop the trailer. During this time, the trucking industry estimated the number of alarms would drop by as much as 80% if the clearance could be raised even a few inches.

The 2007 retrofit also added a weigh-in-motion system that calculates a safe speed for trucks on the 7% grades and curves on the departures from the tunnels and displays it to each driver.

=== Alternate route ===
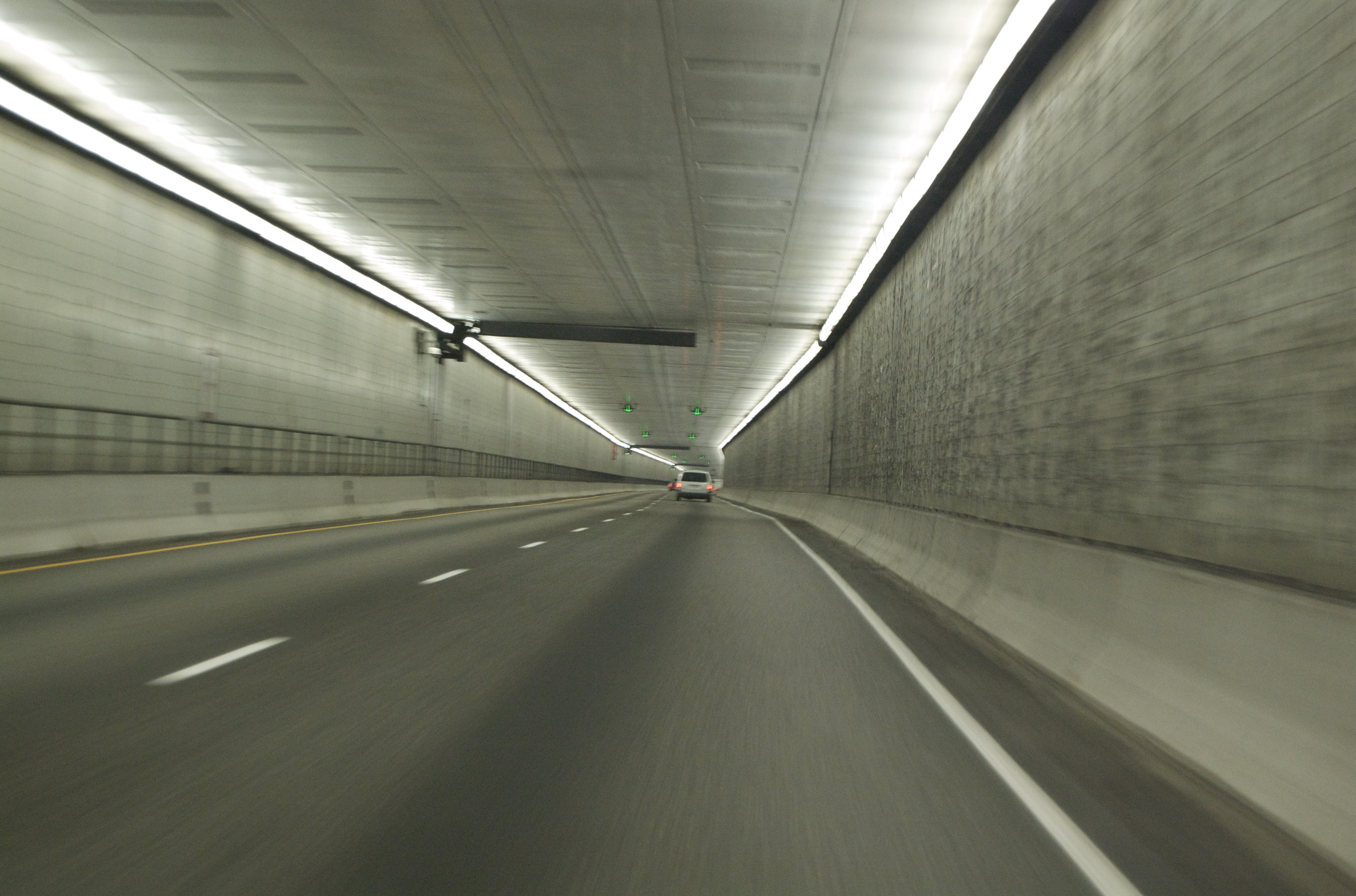
Inside the tunnel in 2008

While the tunnel has largely supplanted the older route of U.S. Highway 6 over Loveland Pass, hazardous material carriers (hazmats), bicycles, and pedestrians are prohibited from the tunnel and must use the pass, which is longer, steeper, and 834 ft (254 m) higher at 11,992 ft (3,655 m). And while the tunnel's route is less formidable than the pass, its approaches are steep nonetheless and have runaway truck ramps.

If Loveland Pass is closed—such as for construction or storms—the hazmat prohibition is temporarily lifted and the tunnel is closed to regular traffic once per hour to allow hazmats to be escorted through the tunnel in a convoy.

== History ==
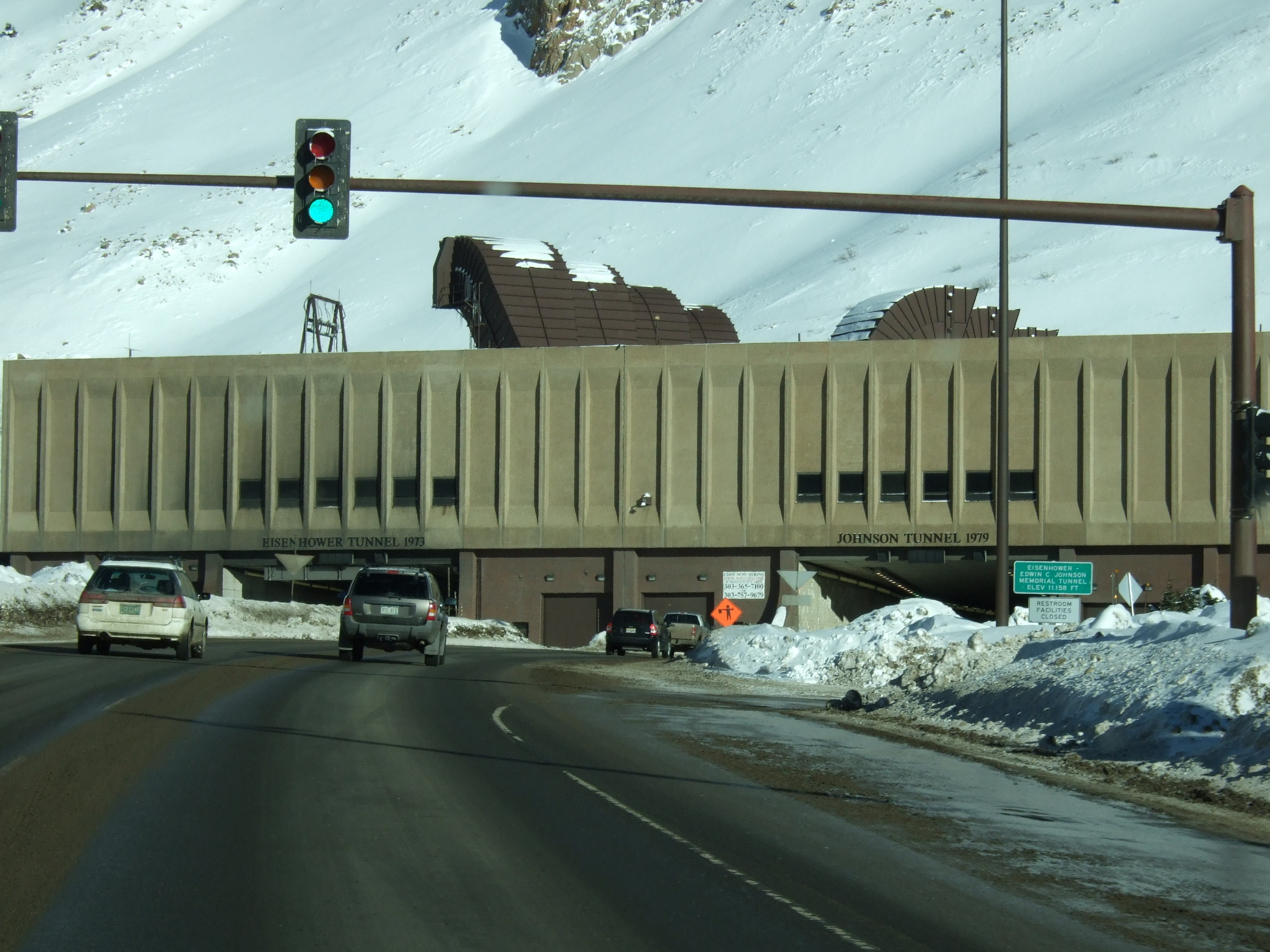
Western portal to the tunnel in 2010. The traffic signal is controlled by a truck height sensor and control personnel.

The idea for a tunnel under Loveland Pass existed since at least the 1950s. William A.H. Loveland had an idea of a tunnel under the divide in 1867, but instead got the wagon road now known as Loveland Pass built. Serious discussion began when the state of Colorado lobbied for the Interstate Highway System to route a transcontinental highway across Colorado. After a round of negotiations with Utah officials, it was decided the best option was to follow the US Route 6 corridor. Engineers recommended tunneling under the pass, rather than attempt to build a route across conforming to Interstate Highway standards.

The Eisenhower–Johnson Memorial Tunnel was known as the Straight Creek Tunnel during construction, named for the waterway that runs along the western approach to the tunnel. Before the tunnel was dedicated, it was renamed to honor Dwight D. Eisenhower and Edwin C. Johnson. The original Pioneer bore to access the two larger bores was "holed through" in late 1964, after fourteen months. Construction on the first bore of the tunnel was started on March 15, 1968. Construction efforts suffered many setbacks and the project went well over time and budget. One of the biggest setbacks was the discovery of fault lines in the path of the tunnel that were not discovered during the pilot bores. The first construction contractor went bankrupt excavating rock in this fault zone. These faults began to slip during construction and emergency measures had to be taken to protect the tunnels and workers from cave-ins and collapses. Despite the best efforts of engineers, three workers were killed boring the first tube and four in boring the second.

Further complicating construction, the boring machines could not work as fast as expected at such high elevations and so the productivity was significantly less than planned. The frustration prompted one engineer to comment, "We were going by the book, but the damned mountain couldn't read." Though the project was supposed to take three years, the tunnel was not opened to traffic until a March 8, 1973, dedication ceremony by Governor John Love. Initially, the northern Eisenhower bore was used for two-way traffic, with one lane for each direction. The amount of traffic through the tunnel exceeded predictions, and efforts soon began to expedite construction on the southern bore. Construction began on the eastbound Edwin C. Johnson tunnel on August 18, 1975, and finished on December 21, 1979. The initial engineering cost estimate for the Eisenhower bore was $42 million, but the actual cost was $108 million (equivalent to $783 million in 2025). Approximately 90% of the funds were paid by the federal government, with the state of Colorado paying the rest. At the time, it set a record for the most expensive federally aided project. The excavation cost for the Johnson bore was $102.8 million (equivalent to $456 million in 2025). Not included in the figures is about $50 million in non-boring expenses during the construction of both tunnels.

Upon opening, it became the highest-elevation tunnel in the world, taking the title from the Salang Tunnel in Afghanistan.

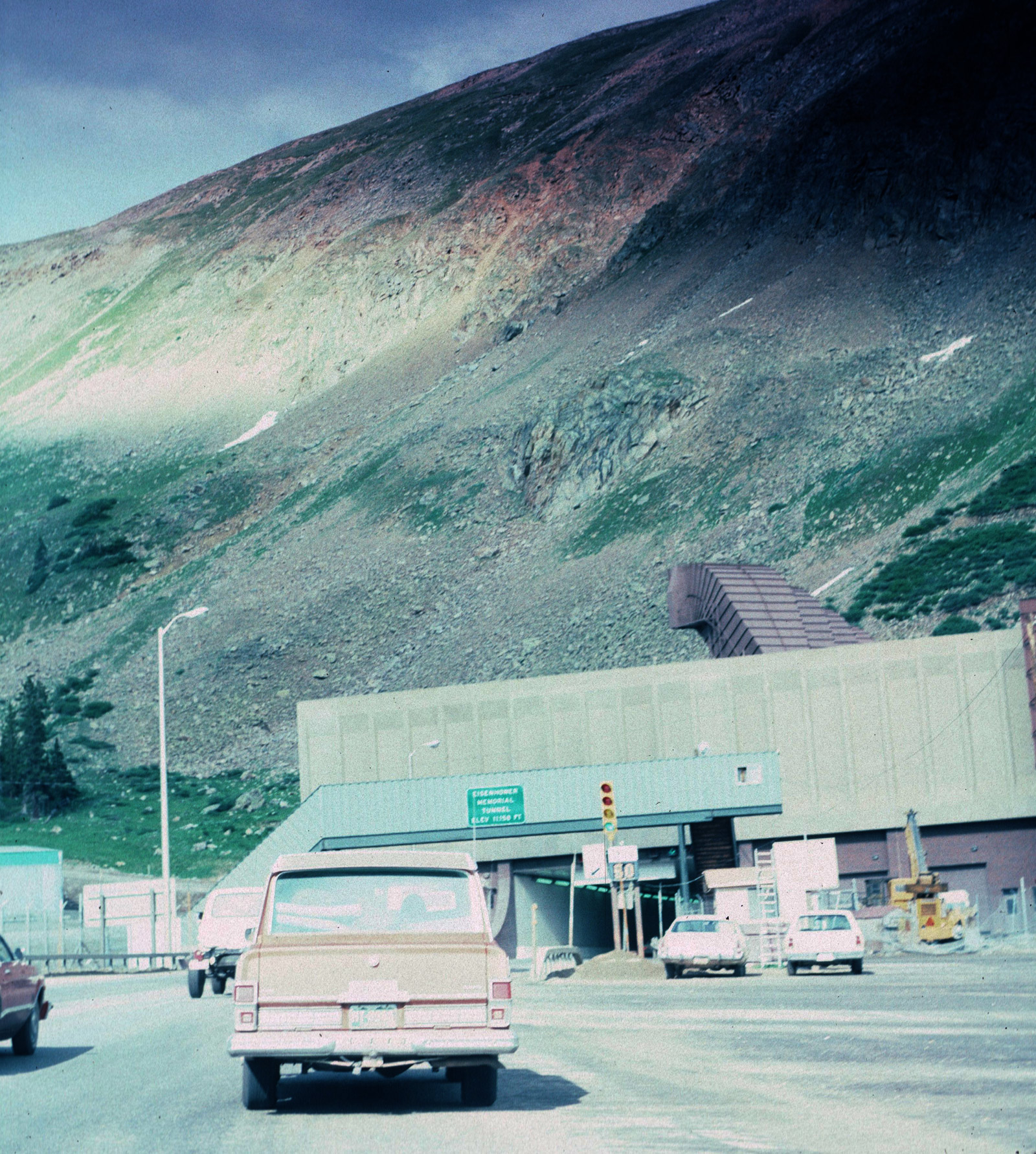
West Portal in summer 1978

The tunnel's construction highlighted issues relevant to the feminist movement. When Janet Bonnema applied for a position as an engineering technician with the Colorado Department of Transportation she was given an assignment on the Straight Creek Tunnels project. Her supervisor misread her resume and thought that he was hiring "James." When the supervisor discovered that the department had hired a woman, she was tasked with doing support work from the office. There was opposition to a woman entering the construction site. One supervisor stated that if she entered, "Those workers would flat walk out of that there tunnel and they'd never come back." The workers, most of whom had a mining background, expressed a common superstition that a woman brought bad luck to a mine. One worker insisted, "It's a jinx. I've seen too many die after a woman was in the tunnel."

Bonnema sued the department for the right to work inside the tunnel. She countered she was in better shape and more agile than most of the men who were working on the tunnel. Emboldened by the passage of an equal rights law in Colorado, she finally entered the tunnel, with an entourage of reporters, on November 9, 1972. Some workers walked off the job, and at least one of them yelled, "Get those women out of here." She remained determined and re-entered the tunnel a few days later. The next time, she dressed in coveralls and was even assigned tasks on the roof of the tunnel overlooking the men below. Surprised that nobody had apparently noticed that she was a woman, she stated, "I had a good disguise." Bonnema continued to dress in coveralls during her subsequent work in the tunnel so as not to attract attention.

In November 2023, CDOT opened an updated operations center and new garage bays at the tunnels.

=== Plane crash during construction ===
On Friday, October 2, 1970, during the tunnel's construction, workers constructing the tunnel were among the first on scene of a plane crash that had occurred less than two miles (3.2 km) northeast of the east portal. A Martin 4-0-4 charter aircraft, one of two carrying the college football team of Wichita State University, crashed just north of the highway (39.6935°N 105.8825°W). Of the 40 passengers and crew on board, only nine survived. The team was on its way to a game with Utah State University in Logan and had recently refueled at Denver's Stapleton International Airport. The plane carrying the team's starters departed Denver and traveled a poorly planned scenic route. The other plane, carrying reserve players, followed the original route through southern Wyoming and landed safely in Logan.

== Water diversion ==
While the Eisenhower Tunnel was primarily intended as a transportation tunnel, it also serves as a water tunnel for water diversion from the western side of the Continental Divide to the eastern side. Water from the Straight Creek watershed (a tributary of the Blue River), along with all seepage entering the tunnel, is discharged into Clear Creek for delivery to the Coors Brewing Company. Typically, the tunnel delivers over 300 acre-feet (370,000 m^{3}) of water per year.

== See also ==
- Lists of tunnels
- List of tunnels in the United States
- Moffat Tunnel, the equivalent for rail traffic, opened in 1928
- Salang Tunnel, another among the highest vehicular tunnels at altitude of 11,200 feet (3,400 m), in Afghanistan
