= Union Pacific Bridge (Two Rivers Bridge) =

Bridge in Kansas City, Kansas, United States

- Coordinates: 39.1141°N 94.6141°W
- Carries: 1 track of Union Pacific Railroad
- Crosses: Kansas River
- Locale: Kansas City, Kansas
- Official name: UPRR Kansas River Bridge 1

Characteristics
- Design: 4 span Thru-Truss

History
- Opened: 1904

The Union Pacific Bridge (Two Rivers Bridge) is the first bridge on the Kansas River at Kansas City. It was built in 1904, and is a four span, through-truss structure carrying a single railroad track. It is located immediately north from the Intercity Viaduct. It replaces the first bridge at this location, which was destroyed by a flood in 1903.
