= Central Avenue Bridge =

Central Avenue Bridge may refer to:

- Central Avenue Bridge (Batesville, Arkansas), listed on the NRHP in Arkansas
- Central Avenue Bridge (Kansas City, Kansas)
- Central Avenue Bridge (Minneapolis)
