= Interstate 670 (Kansas–Missouri) =

Highway in Kansas and Missouri

Interstate 670
- Jay B. Dillingham Freeway
- I-670 highlighted in red

Route information
- Auxiliary route of I-70
- Length: 2.81 mi (4.52 km)
- Existed: 1968–present
- NHS: Entire route

Major junctions
- West end: I-70 / US-24 / US-40 / US-69 / US-169 in Kansas City, KS
- I-35 in Kansas City, MO
- East end: I-70 / US 24 / US 40 / US 71 in Kansas City, MO

Location
- Country: United States
- States: Kansas, Missouri
- Counties: KS: Wyandotte; MO: Jackson

Highway system
- Interstate Highway System; Main; Auxiliary; Suffixed; Business; Future
- Kansas State Highway System; Interstate; US; State; Spurs
- Missouri State Highway System; Interstate; US; State; Supplemental
← I-635	KS	→ K-1
← I-635	MO	→ Route 740

Interstate 670 (I-670) is a 2.81-mile-long (4.52 km) connector highway between I-70 in Kansas City, Kansas, and I-70 in Kansas City, Missouri. The highway provides a more direct route through Downtown Kansas City than the older mainline I-70 and avoids the sharp turn (and reduced speed limit) of the latter at the west end of the Intercity Viaduct. I-670 also makes up the south side of Kansas City's Downtown Loop, where it passes under the southern half of the Kansas City Convention Center.

The road crosses the Kansas River and the West Bottoms, the former location of the Kansas City Stockyards, on the I-670 Viaduct. The leg of the highway west of I-35 is known as the Jay B. Dillingham Freeway. Jay B. Dillingham was a former president of the Stockyards.

== Route description ==
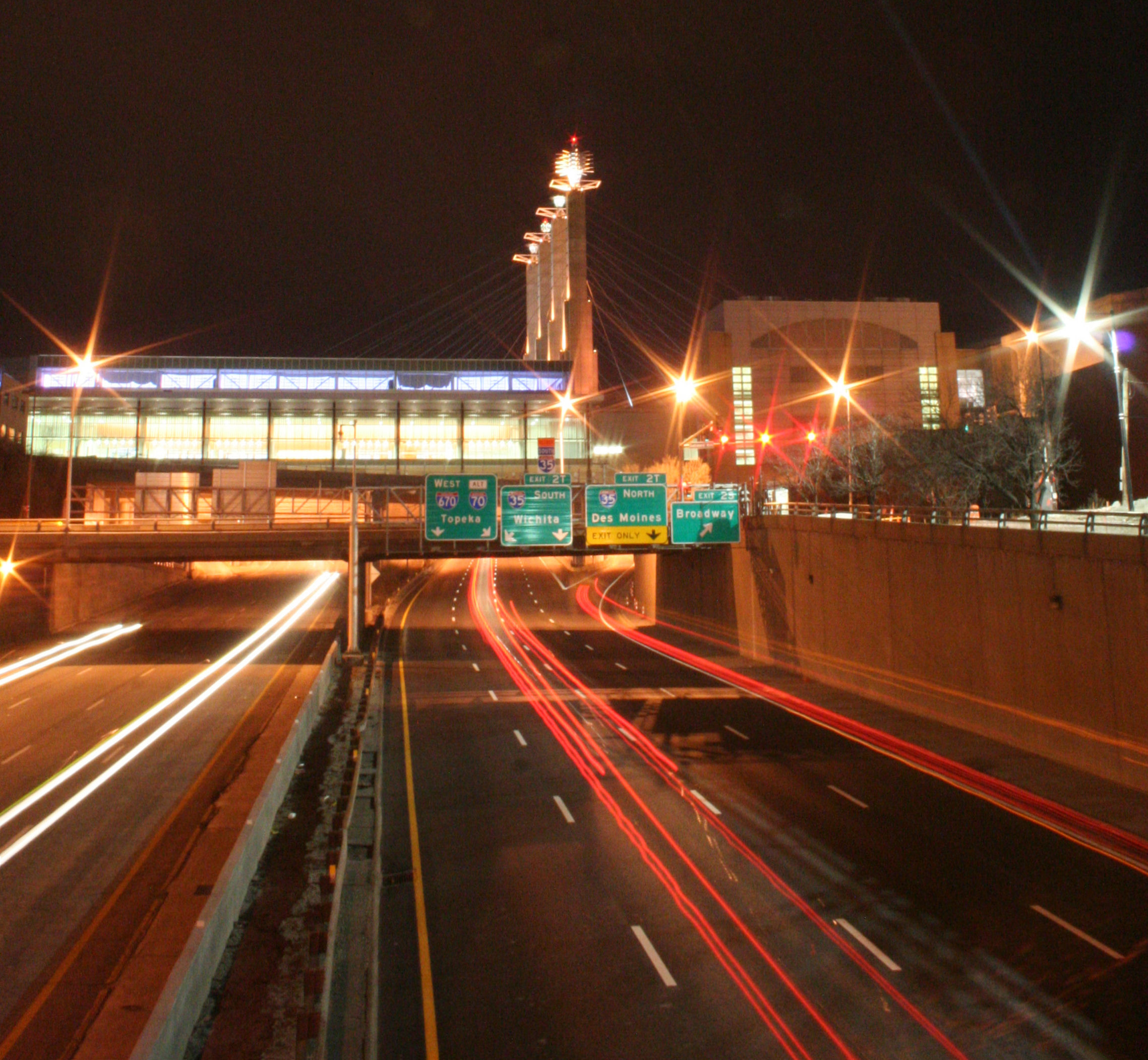
Looking westbound on I-670 passing below the Kansas City Convention Center at night

I-670 begins in Kansas City, Kansas, as ramps from I-70/U.S. Route 24 (US 24)/US 40/US 169 meet to form the freeway just before a bridge over the Kansas River, which is located just south of its confluence with the Missouri River. The freeway then crosses the Kansas–Missouri state line and enters Kansas City, Missouri. The road then has an interchange with I-35 just before passing beneath the Kansas City Convention Center. The freeway passes just to the south of the Kansas City Power & Light District and T-Mobile Center in Downtown Kansas City. It meets up with I-70/US 40 again on the southeastern corner of the downtown area; US 71 comprises the north–south portion of the interchange. In Missouri, I-670 is signed as an alternate route to I-70.

== History ==
The freeway was not part of the original planned freeways around Kansas City in 1955. The section east of the I-35 interchange was built first and finished in 1968. The western portion was not planned until 1971 and was not finished until several years later. By 1987, the freeway was extended slightly westward in the Downtown Kansas City area but was not fully extended to I-70 until 1991, when it was fully opened.

On May 20, 1997, sections of I-670 and I-35 in Downtown Kansas City were closed for the filming of a music video for the U2 song "Last Night on Earth". The closure, which was criticized by a local American Automobile Association official, caused some traffic congestion and was the subject of 50–60 complaints to the city government.

== Exit list ==
State	County	Location	mi	km	Exit	Destinations	Notes
Kansas	Wyandotte	Kansas City	0.00	0.00		I-70 / US-24 / US-40 west / US-69 south – Topeka	I-70 exit 421B
Kansas	Wyandotte	Kansas City	0.39	0.63	1A	Central Avenue	Westbound exit and eastbound entrance
Kansas	Wyandotte	Kansas City	0.47– 0.56	0.76– 0.90	Kansas River bridge		
			0.83 0.00	1.34 0.00	Kansas–Missouri state line		
Missouri	Jackson	Kansas City	0.13– 0.19	0.21– 0.31	1B	Genesee Street / Wyoming Street	
Missouri	Jackson	Kansas City	0.88	1.42	2T	I-35 south – Wichita	I-35 exit 2U
Missouri	Jackson	Kansas City	0.88	1.42	2T	I-35 north / 12th Street	Westbound exit and eastbound entrance; I-35 exit 2U
Missouri	Jackson	Kansas City	1.02	1.64	2S	Broadway	Westbound exit and eastbound entrance. Access to Kansas City Convention Center and Kauffman Center for the Performing Arts.
Missouri	Jackson	Kansas City	1.10	1.77	2R	Central Street	Eastbound exit only; access to Downtown, Kansas City Convention Center, Kauffman Center for the Performing Arts, Power and Light District, and T-Mobile Center.
Missouri	Jackson	Kansas City	1.42	2.29	2Q	Truman Road / Locust Street / Oak Street / Grand Boulevard / Walnut Street / Main Street / Baltimore Avenue	Westbound exit and eastbound entrance. Access to Power and Light District and T-Mobile Center.
Missouri	Jackson	Kansas City	2.10	3.38	2P	13th Street / 14th Street / Charlotte Street / Holmes Street	Westbound exit and eastbound entrance only. Access to Downtown Kansas City, UMKC Medical School, and Truman Medical Center-Hospital Hill.
Missouri	Jackson	Kansas City	2.10	3.38	2N	I-70 west / US 71 north to I-29 / I-35 north – St. Joseph, Des Moines	Eastbound exit and westbound entrance; I-70 exit 2L
Missouri	Jackson	Kansas City	2.10	3.38	2M	US 71 south – Joplin	Eastbound exit and westbound entrance. Access to UMKC Medical School, and Truman Medical Center-Hospital Hill.
Missouri	Jackson	Kansas City	2.10	3.38	2K	12th Street / 11th Street to Charlotte Street / 10th Street / Harrison Street / Troost Avenue	Westbound exit and eastbound entrance
Missouri	Jackson	Kansas City	2.10	3.38	3A	The Paseo	Eastbound exit and entrance and westbound exit only. Access to the American Jazz Museum and the Negro Leagues Baseball Museum.
Missouri	Jackson	Kansas City	2.10	3.38		I-70 / US 24 east / US 40 – St. Louis	I-70 exit 2L
1.000 mi = 1.609 km; 1.000 km = 0.621 mi: Incomplete access
