= Kansas City Convention Center =

Convention center

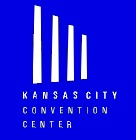
- Interactive map of Kansas City Convention Center
- Location: Kansas City, Missouri
- Coordinates: 39°5′51″N 94°35′16″W
- Operator: Kansas City Convention & Entertainment Facilities

Construction
- Opened: July 8, 1976; 49 years ago
- Expanded: 1994
- Construction cost: $91.7 million
- Architect: Helmut Jahn

Website
- kcconvention.com

The Kansas City Convention Center, originally Bartle Hall Convention Center or Bartle Hall, is a major convention center in Downtown Kansas City, Missouri, USA. It was named for Harold Roe Bartle, a prominent, two-term mayor of Kansas City in the 1950s and early-1960s. Its roof is suspended by four tall art deco inspired pylons, as a component of the Kansas City skyline.

== Overview ==
Kansas City Convention Center is the city's largest complex of multifaceted structures dedicated to meetings and conventions, sports, and entertainment. It has 388,800 square feet (36,120 m^{2}) of column-free exhibit space on one floor, 211,000 square feet (19,600 m^{2}) of tenant finishes, a 200,000-square-foot (20,000 m^{2}) conference center, another 55,000 square feet (5,100 m^{2}) of additional space on two levels, 45 meeting rooms, a 2,400-seat fine arts theater, and an arena that can seat over 10,700 people, along with a 46,450-square-foot (4,300 m^{2}) ballroom that was scheduled for an April 2007 opening. This is all connected to major downtown hotels and underground parking by glass-enclosed skywalks and below-ground walkways. The Barney Allis Plaza is a public square for outdoor receptions, festivals, and concerts.

The exterior of the facility is highlighted by a 30 feet (360 in) high metal panel canopy over pavestone walkway at the main entry. The southern elevation of the building again features a high canopy with fixed blade sunshades and opens onto a decorative concrete plaza designed by Jun Kaneko, a renowned Japanese ceramic artist.

=== Pylons ===
The center sits above Interstate 670, suspended by steel cables supported by four 335 feet (102 m) tall concrete pylons.

The sculptures that crown the pylons, called Sky Stations, were designed by artist R.M. Fischer in 1994. Each is made of aluminum and steel, approximately 24x15-feet in diameter, and between 20 feet (6.1 m) and 25 feet (7.6 m) in height. They were primarily inspired by the 1930s Art Deco chandelier and decorative design elements throughout the adjacent Municipal Auditorium. They were placed atop each pillar via helicopter.

Lightning damage was found to the easternmost Sky Station during an inspection in late 2015. The sculpture was removed for repair on May 8, 2016. The repair project cost $1.6 million, all but $250,000 of which was covered by insurance. The repaired Sky Station was reinstalled on September 18, 2016, and electricians also installed 50 LED lights, as part of the downtown skyline.

== Construction ==
The expansion of Bartle Hall was a significant technical challenge. Construction of the additional convention space was built above a continuously open six-lane freeway, Interstate 670. This required the installation of four 300 feet (90 m) tall pylons to support the facility's roof. This is the largest, column-free, convention environment in the world. It was designed to meet green building standards and achieved the city's first LEED Silver rating.

The general contractor was Walton Construction. The site team included 2 LEED Accredited Professionals documenting and tracking materials, construction methods, recycling, and waste management. Architects were HNTB Architects, BNIM; engineers were Henderson Engineers; and multimedia, acoustics, and IT were by Shen Milsom & Wilke.

In 2000, American Institute of Architects wrote, "The 1976 building is architecturally noteworthy for its structural system of steel trusses that frame directly onto triangular end-frames." Those huge triangles were too heavy for highways, so barges carried them up the Missouri River.

The total project cost was $91.7 million, and it was completed on schedule in July 1994.

== Gallery ==
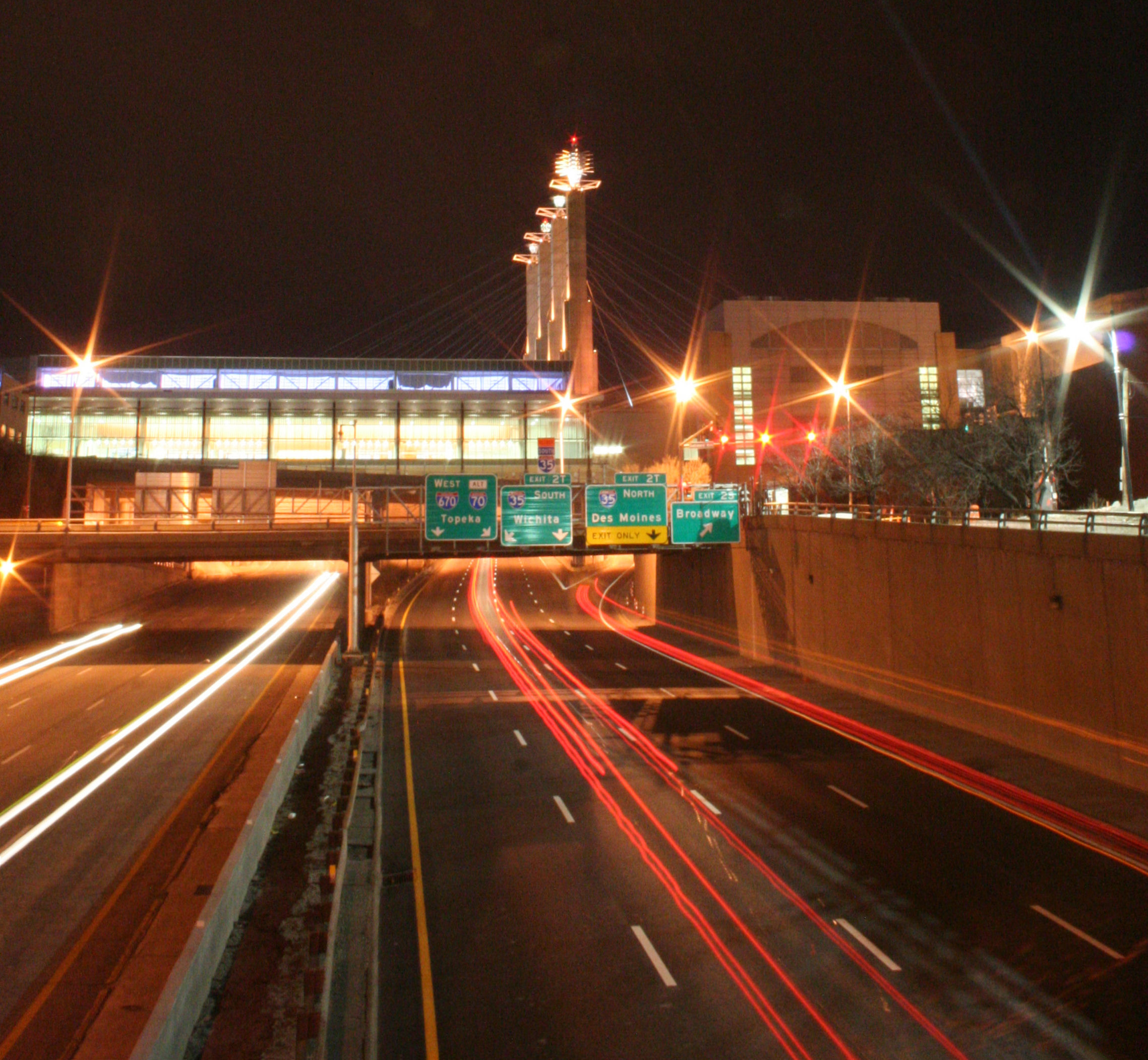
The Center stretches across Interstate 670 in Kansas City.

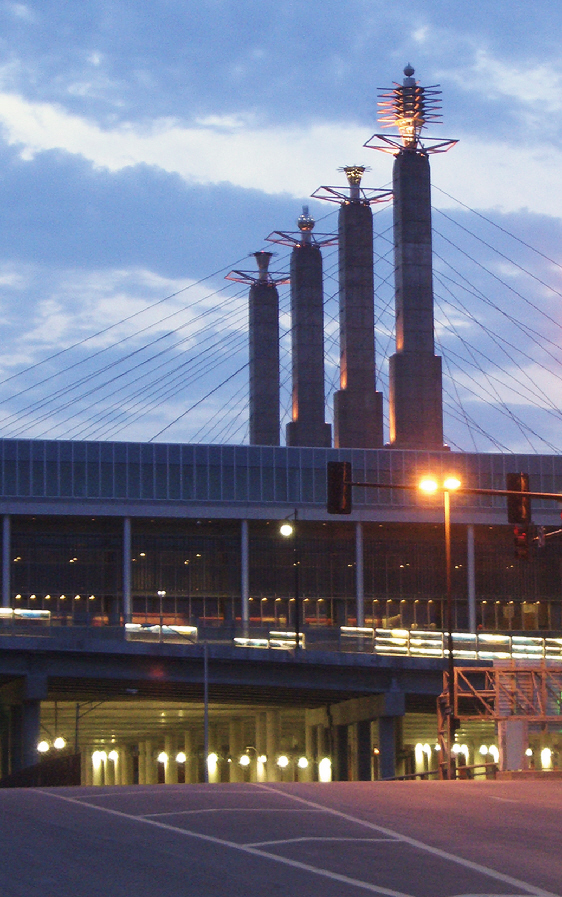
The Center is suspended above Truman Road and Interstate I-670.

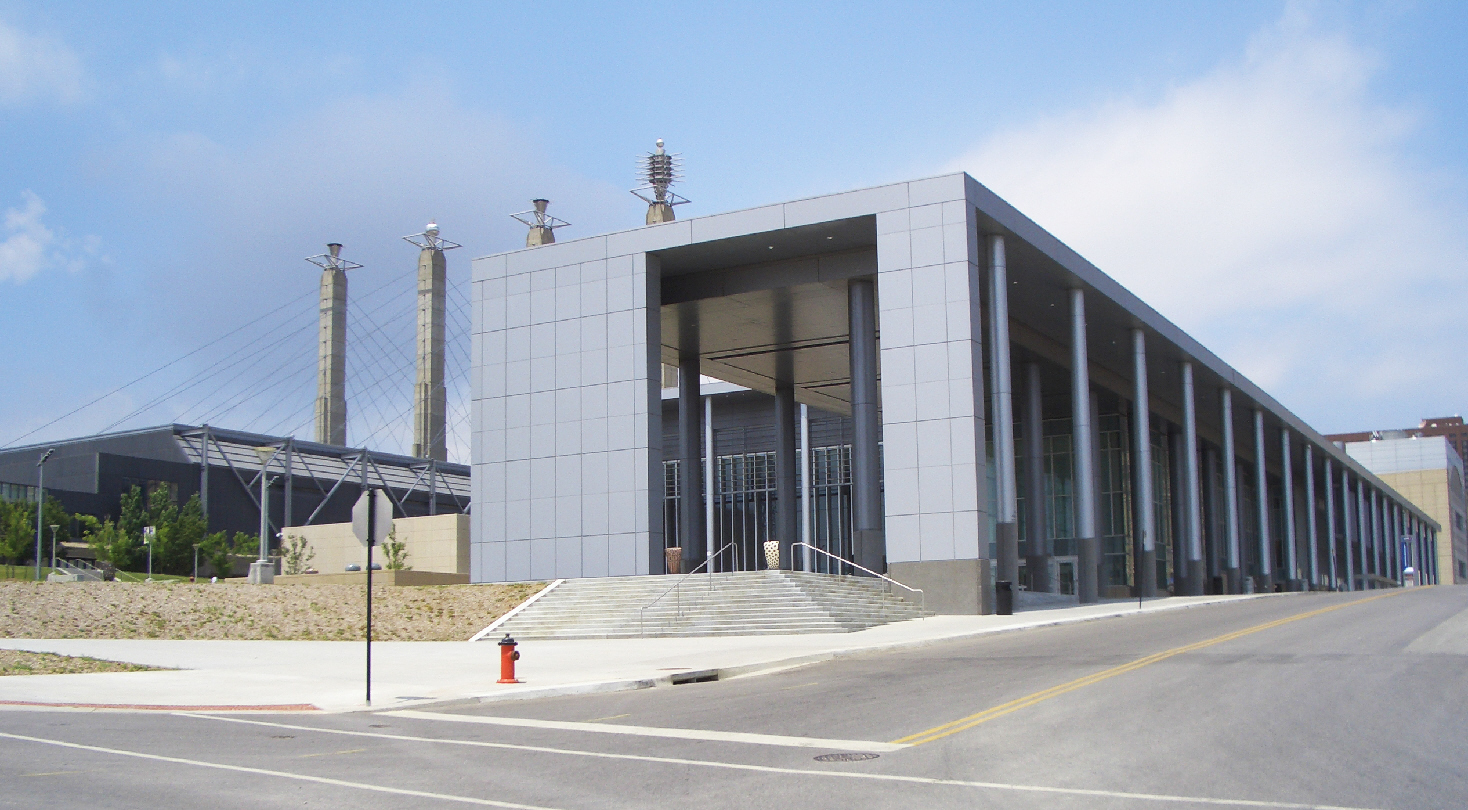
The Center expansion, viewed from 16th Street.

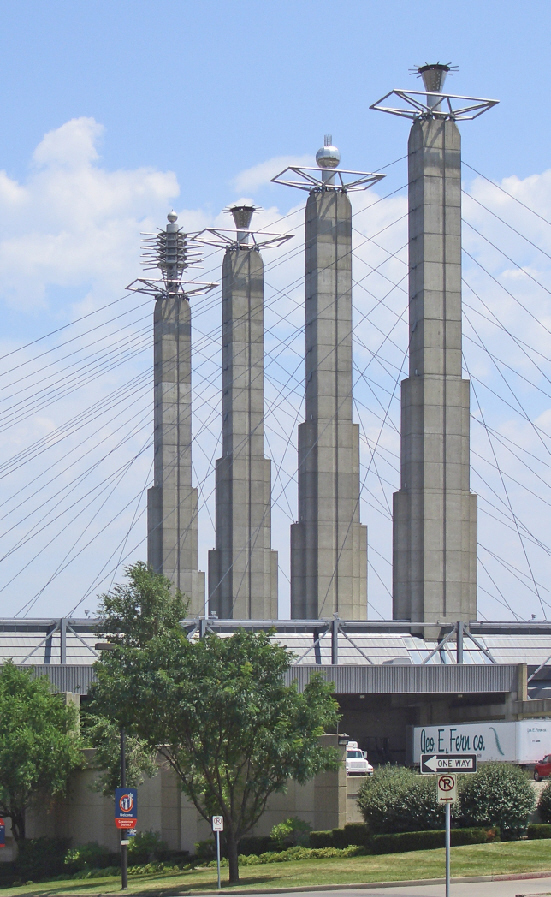
Pylons viewed from W. 12th Street

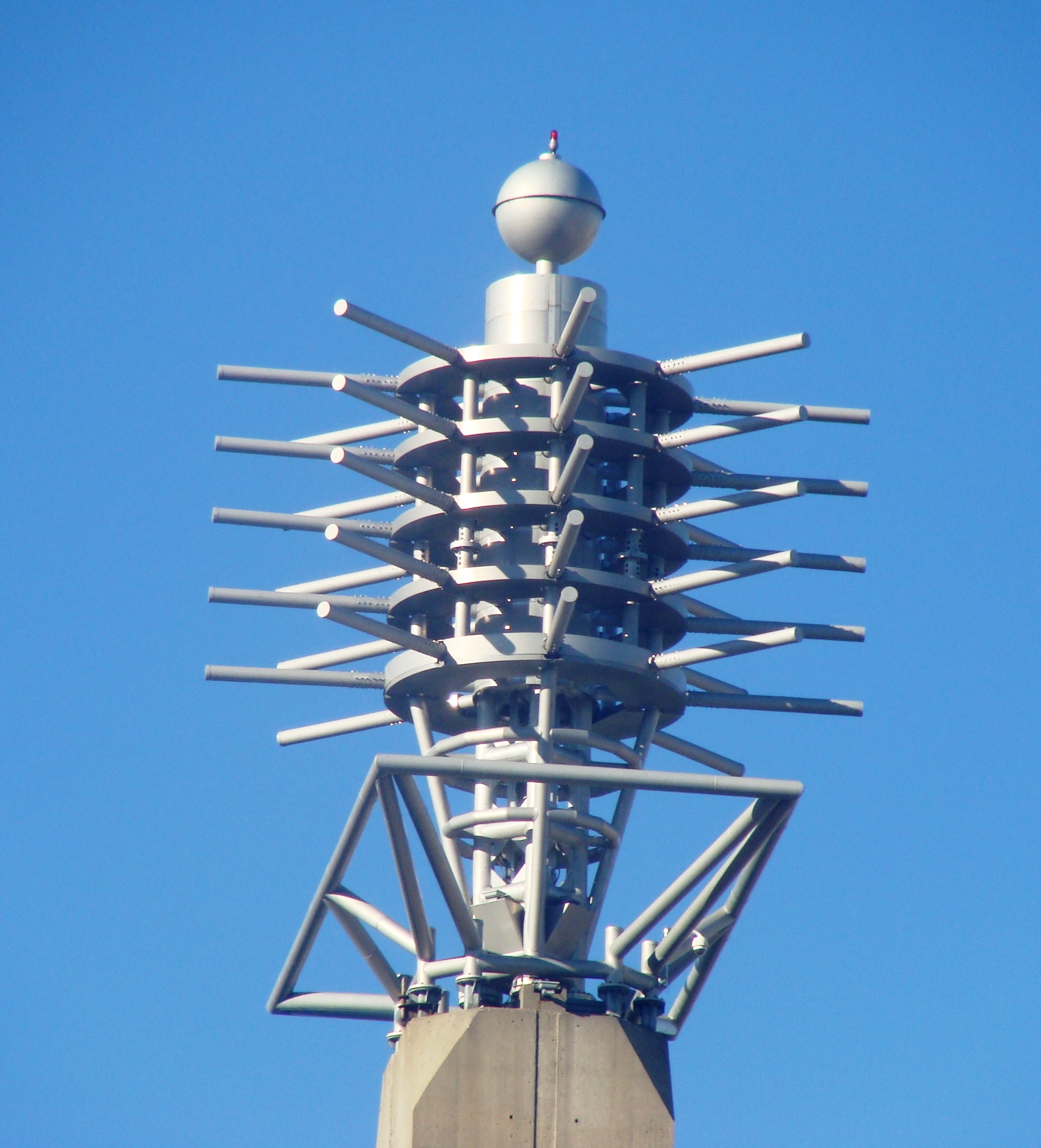
A sculpture

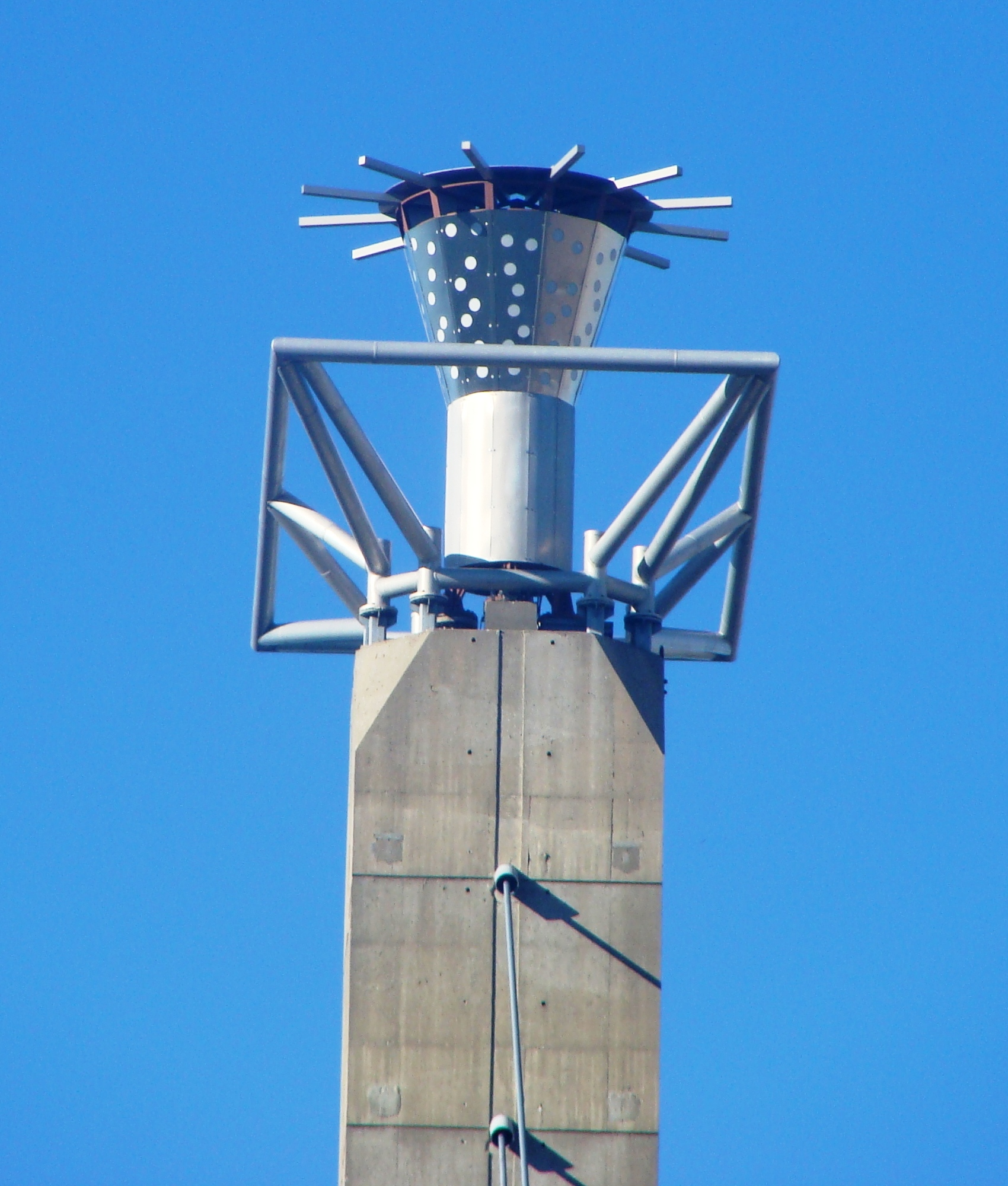
A sculpture

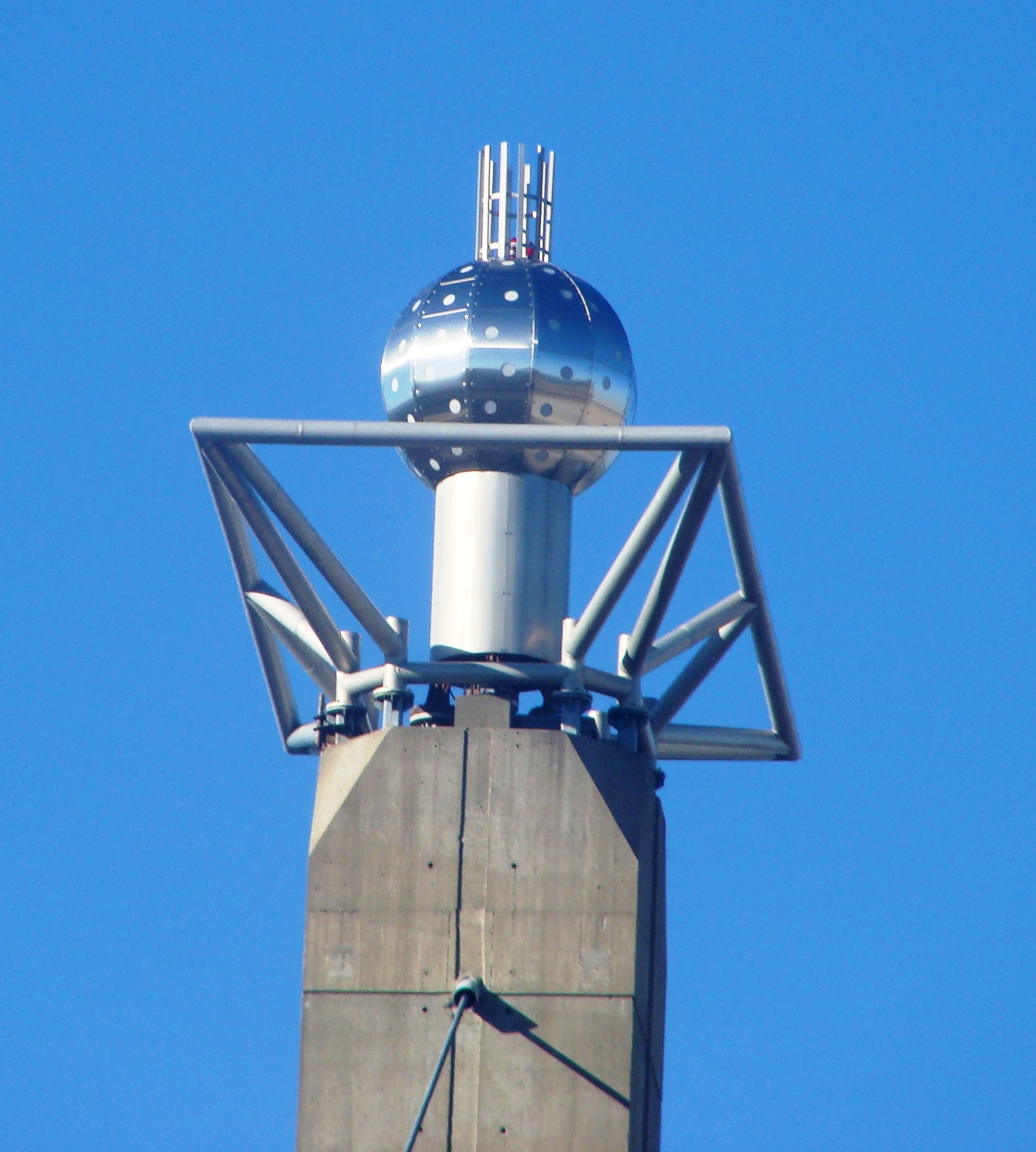
A sculpture

== See also ==
- Empire Towers, another artwork by Fischer located in Indianapolis, Indiana
