= I-670 Viaduct =

Interstate 670 Viaduct
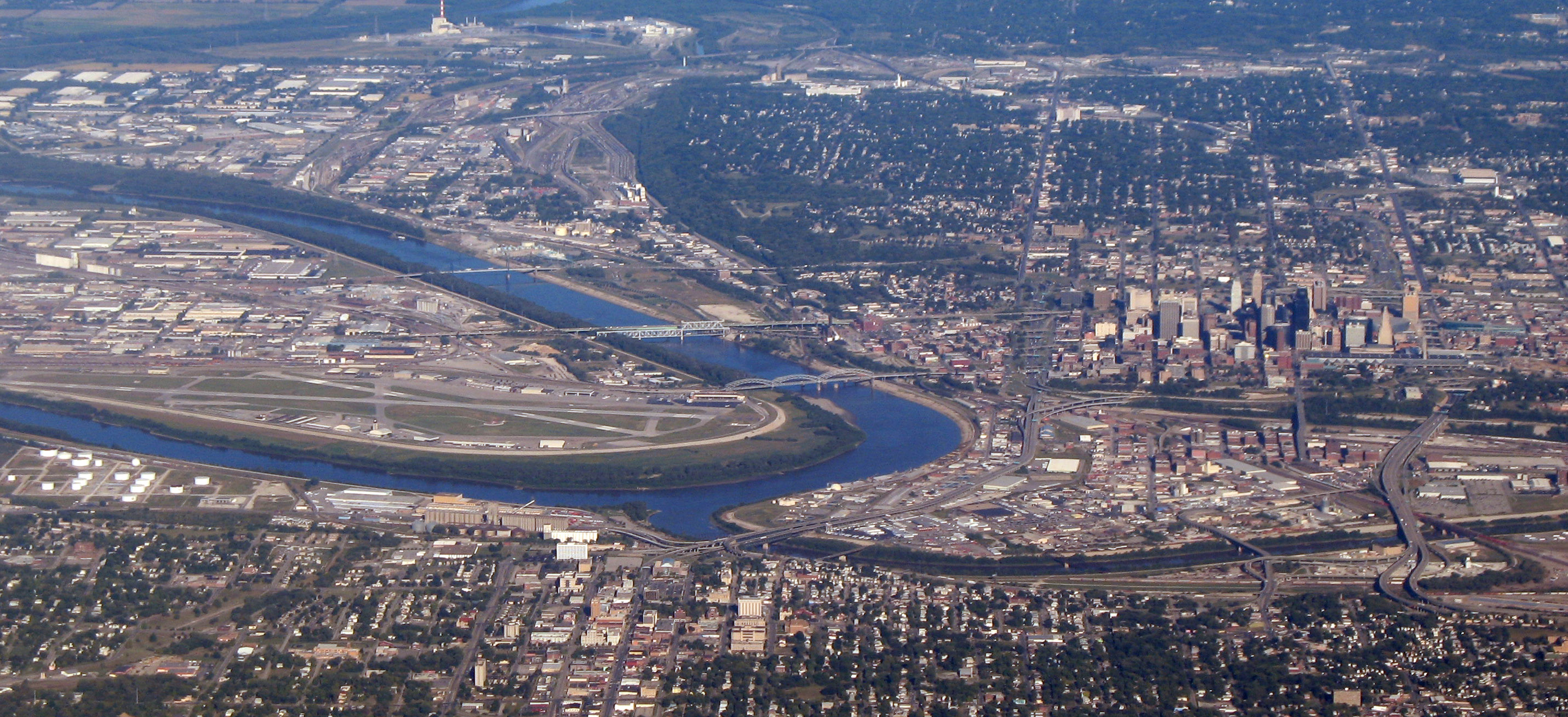
- The I-670 Viaduct is in the lower right corner
- Coordinates: 39.0989°N 94.6127°W
- Carries: 6 lanes of I-670 in Kansas City
- Crosses: Kansas River, West Bottoms, railroad tracks
- Locale: Kansas City, Kansas to Kansas City, Missouri
- Official name: Jay B. Dillingham Freeway Bridge

Characteristics
- Design: Multi-Beam Girder

History
- Opened: 1990

Location
- Interactive map of Interstate 670 Viaduct

The I-670 Viaduct is an automobile crossing of the Kansas River, and West Bottoms in Kansas City, Kansas, and Kansas City, Missouri. It was built in 1990, and carries six lanes (three east, three west) of Interstate 670 through Kansas City. The bridge is also called the Jay B. Dillingham bridge. (Dillingham was the president of the Kansas City Stockyards) It is just north of the Missouri Pacific Bridge, and south of the Central Avenue Bridge (Kansas City) over the Kansas River.
