= Central Avenue Bridge (Kansas City, Kansas) =

- Coordinates: 39.1026°N 94.6152°W
- Carries: 6 lanes of Central Avenue, 2 on lower level, 4 on upper
- Crosses: Kansas River
- Locale: Kansas City, Kansas
- Maintained by: WyCo Unified Government

Characteristics
- Design: Deck Truss

History
- Opened: 1918
- Closed: 2021

Location
- Interactive map of Central Avenue Bridge

The Central Avenue Bridge is two level deck truss bridge over the Kansas River in Kansas City, Kansas. It was built in 1918, and rebuilt in 1984. It is just south of the Kansas City Southern Bridge, and north of the I-670 Viaduct over the Kansas River.

== Closure ==
In February 2021, the bridge closed to all traffic. After structural analysis was conducted, the bridge was evaluated to have extensive deterioration of its bottom truss members.

In January 2026, the Kansas Department of Transportation (KDOT) and the Unified Government announced a plan for joint funding to replace the Central Avenue Bridge along with some KDOT-owned bridges on Central Avenue over I-70 and the Union Pacific Railroad. The following month, a proposal was approved by the Appropriations Committee of the Kansas House of Representatives to delay infrastructure plans in the urbanized area of northeast Kansas and redistribute funds to the other parts of the state. Local officials in Kansas City, Kansas, speculated that the proposal is aimed at the Central Avenue Bridge replacement and is linked to negotiations related to tax incentives for the relocation of the Kansas City Chiefs football team from Kansas City, Missouri to Kansas.
