= Interstate 70 =

East–west Interstate Highway across central US

Interstate 70

Route information
- Length: 2,158.43 mi (3,473.66 km)
- Existed: August 14, 1957–present
- History: Completed in 1992
- NHS: Entire route

Major junctions
- West end: I-15 near Cove Fort, UT
- I-25 in Denver, CO; I-29 / I-35 in Kansas City, MO; I-64 in Wentzville, MO; I-44 in St. Louis, MO; I-55 from East St. Louis to Troy, IL; I-65 / I-69 / I-74 in Indianapolis, IN; I-75 in Vandalia, OH; I-71 in Columbus, OH; I-76 from New Stanton, PA to Breezewood, PA; I-81 in Hagerstown, MD
- East end: I-695 in Woodlawn, MD

Location
- Country: United States
- States: Utah, Colorado, Kansas, Missouri, Illinois, Indiana, Ohio, West Virginia, Pennsylvania, Maryland

Highway system
- Interstate Highway System; Main; Auxiliary; Suffixed; Business; Future

Interstate 70 (I-70) is a major east–west Interstate Highway in the United States that runs from I-15 near Cove Fort, Utah, to I-695 and Maryland Route 570 (MD 570) in Woodlawn, just outside Baltimore, Maryland.

I-70 approximately traces the path of U.S. Route 40 (US 40; the old National Road) east of the Rocky Mountains. West of the Rocky Mountains, the route of I-70 was derived from multiple sources. The Interstate runs through or near many major U.S. cities, including Denver, Topeka, Kansas City, St. Louis, Indianapolis, Columbus, and Baltimore. The sections of the Interstate in Missouri and Kansas have laid claim to be the first Interstate in the United States. The Federal Highway Administration (FHWA) has claimed the section of I-70 through Glenwood Canyon in Colorado, completed in 1992, to be the last piece of the Interstate Highway System, as originally planned, to open to traffic.

The construction of I-70 in Colorado and Utah is considered an engineering marvel, as the route passes through the Eisenhower Tunnel, Glenwood Canyon, and the San Rafael Swell. The Eisenhower Tunnel is the highest point along the Interstate Highway System, with an elevation of 11,158 feet (3,401 m).

== Route description ==
Lengths
| | mi | km |
|---|---|---|
| UT | 231.85 | 373.13 |
| CO | 450.18 | 724.49 |
| KS | 423.68 | 681.85 |
| MO | 249.36 | 401.31 |
| IL | 138.74 | 223.28 |
| IN | 154.96 | 249.38 |
| OH | 225.58 | 363.04 |
| WV | 14.45 | 23.26 |
| PA | 167.92 | 270.24 |
| MD | 91.71 | 147.59 |
| Total | 2,158.43 | 3,473.66 |

=== Utah ===
I-70 begins at an interchange with I-15 near Cove Fort. Heading east, I-70 crosses between the Tushar and Pahvant ranges via Clear Creek Canyon and descends into the Sevier Valley, where I-70 serves Richfield, one of two towns of more than a few hundred people along I-70's path in Utah. The second town with more than a few hundred people served by I-70 is Salina. Upon leaving the valley near Salina, I-70 crosses the 7,923-foot (2,415 m) Salina Summit and then crosses a large geologic formation called the San Rafael Swell.

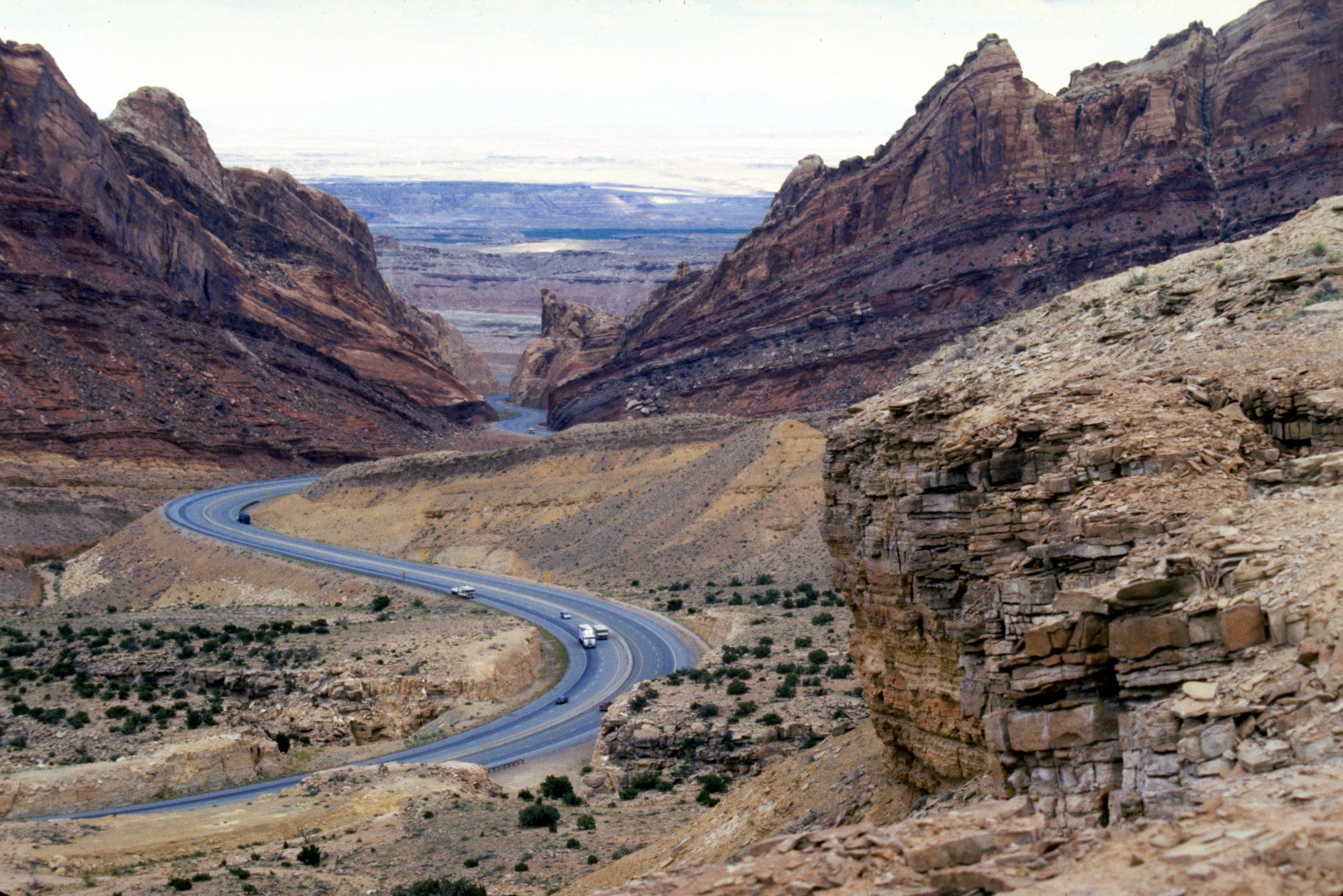
I-70 passes through Spotted Wolf Canyon at the eastern edge of the San Rafael Swell in Utah.

Prior to the construction of I-70, the swell was inaccessible via paved roads and relatively undiscovered. Once this 108-mile (174 km) section was opened to traffic in 1970, it became the longest stretch of Interstate Highway with no services and the first highway in the U.S. built over a completely new route since the Alaska Highway. It also became the longest piece of Interstate Highway to be opened at one time. Although opened in 1970, this section was not formally complete until 1990, when a second steel arch bridge spanning Eagle Canyon was opened to traffic.

Since I-70's construction, the swell has been noted for its desolate beauty. The swell has since been nominated for national park or national monument status on multiple occasions. If the swell is granted this status, it arguably would be the first time a national park owes its existence to an Interstate Highway. Most of the exits in this span are rest areas, brake check areas, and runaway truck ramps with few traditional freeway exits.

I-70 exits the swell near Green River. From Green River to the Colorado state line, I-70 follows the southern edge of the Book Cliffs.

=== Colorado ===
Entering from Utah, I-70 descends into the Grand Valley, where it meets the Colorado River, which provides its path up the western slope of the Rocky Mountains. Here, I-70 serves the Grand Junction metropolitan area before traversing more mountainous terrain.

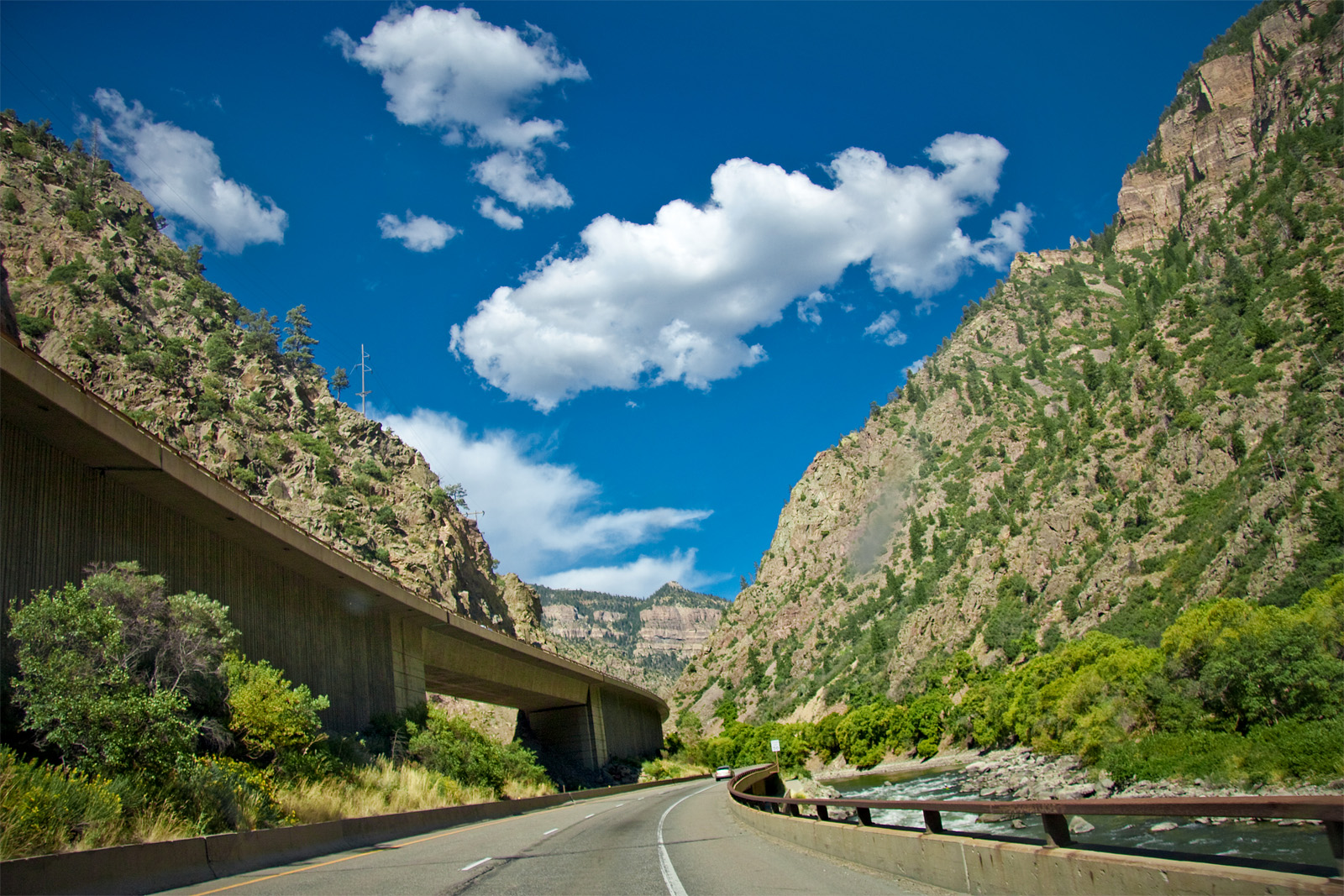
I-70 at Glenwood Canyon

The last section of I-70 to be completed was the 15-mile (24 km) Glenwood Canyon. This stretch was completed in 1992 and was an engineering marvel due to the extremely difficult terrain and narrow space in the canyon, which requires corners that are sharper than normal Interstate standards. Construction was delayed for many years due to environmental concerns. The difficulties in building the road in the canyon were compounded by the fact the Denver and Rio Grande Western Railroad occupied the south bank, and many temporary construction projects took place to keep US 6 open, at the time the only east–west road in the area. Much of the highway is elevated above the Colorado River. The speed limit in this section is 50 mph (80 km/h) due to the limited sight distance and sharp corners.

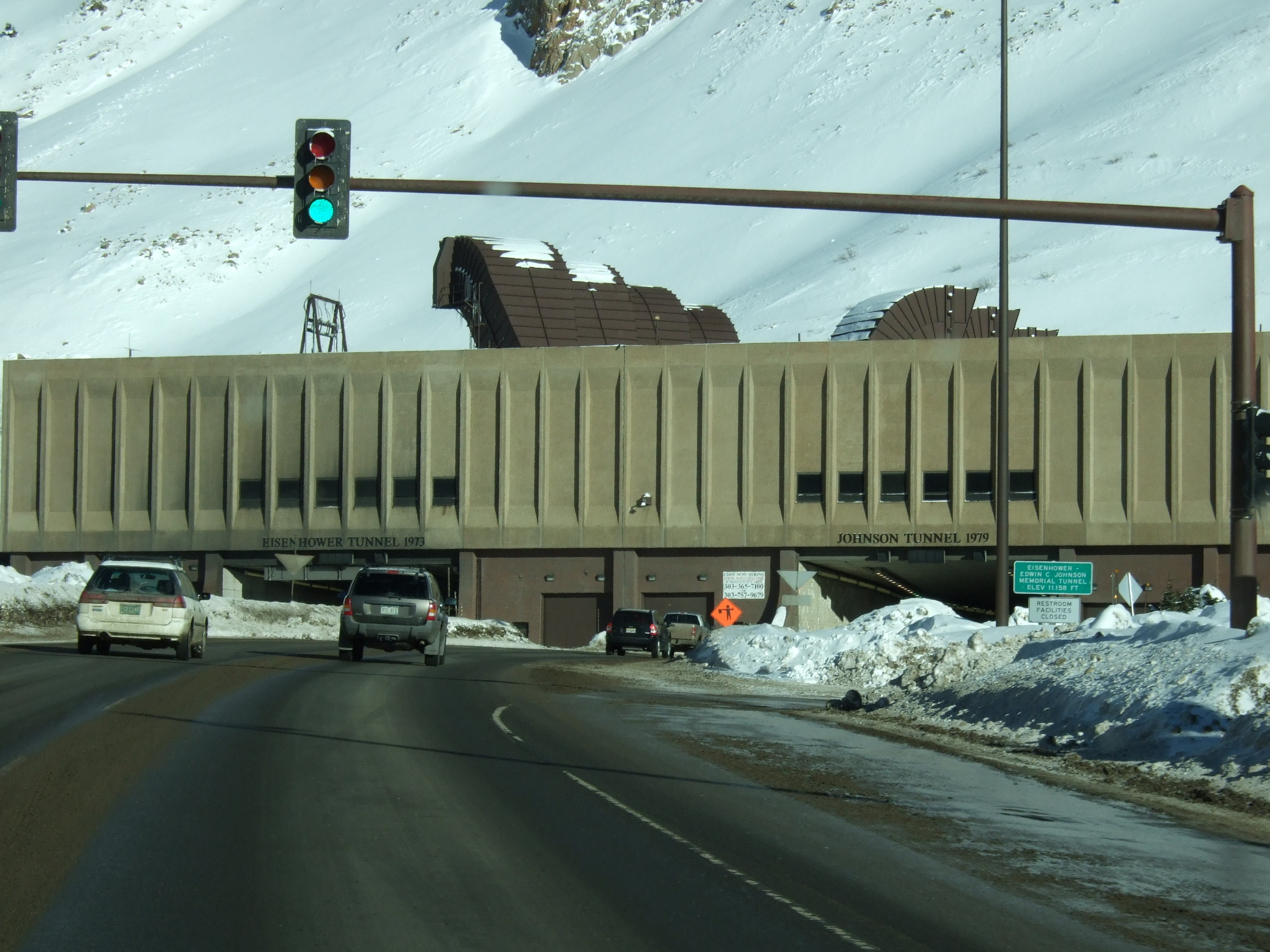
I-70 at the portal of the Eisenhower Tunnel. The traffic signal is controlled from a command center and used for incident management.

The Eisenhower Tunnel, the highest vehicular tunnel in North America and the longest tunnel built under the Interstate program, passes through the Continental Divide.

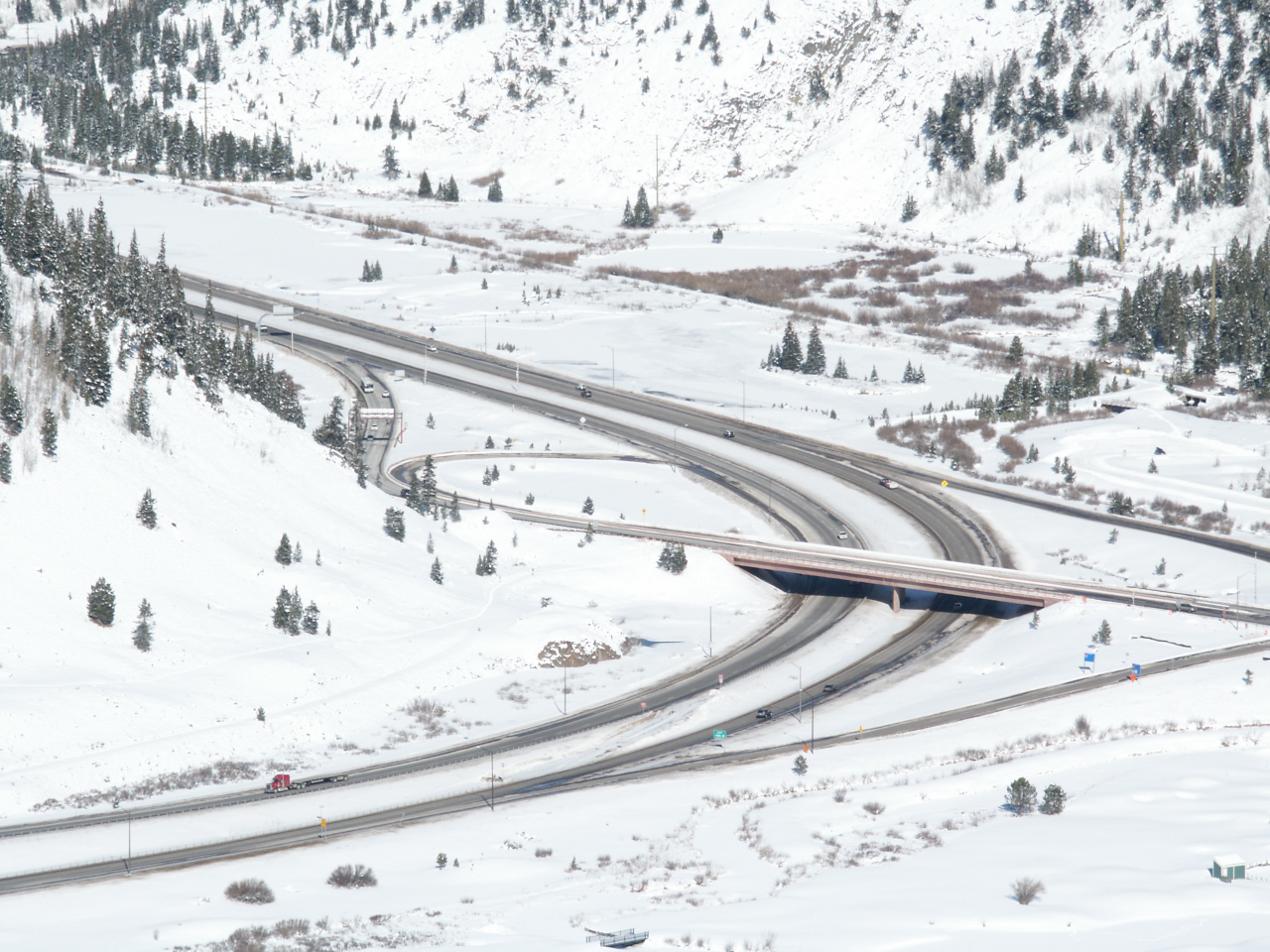
I-70 as it turns north at Copper Mountain, approximately 2.5 miles (4.0 km) from Vail Pass

Because of the rugged and narrow terrain of the Rocky Mountains, I-70 is one of few roads connecting Colorado's ski resorts with Denver.

Descending through the eastern foothills of the Rocky Mountains, one can see the Denver skyline on a clear day. This can fool truckers and other unsuspecting drivers because one must still traverse 10 miles (16 km) of steep grade road before reaching the city. A series of signs warns truckers of the steep grade. As I-70 leaves the foothills, it goes through Denver and intersects I-25, serving as the central east–west artery through the city. Leaving Denver, I-70 levels out and traverses the wide plains through eastern Colorado. East of Denver, I-70 makes a broad turn to the south-southeast for 30 miles (48 km), before reaching Limon and resuming its eastward journey toward Kansas.

=== Kansas ===
Coming from Colorado, I-70 enters the prairie, farmlands, and rolling hills of Kansas. This portion of I-70 was the first segment to be paved and completed in the Interstate Highway System. It is given the nickname "Main Street of Kansas", as the Interstate extends from the western border to the eastern border of the state, covering 424 miles (682 km) and passing through most of the state's principal cities in the process.

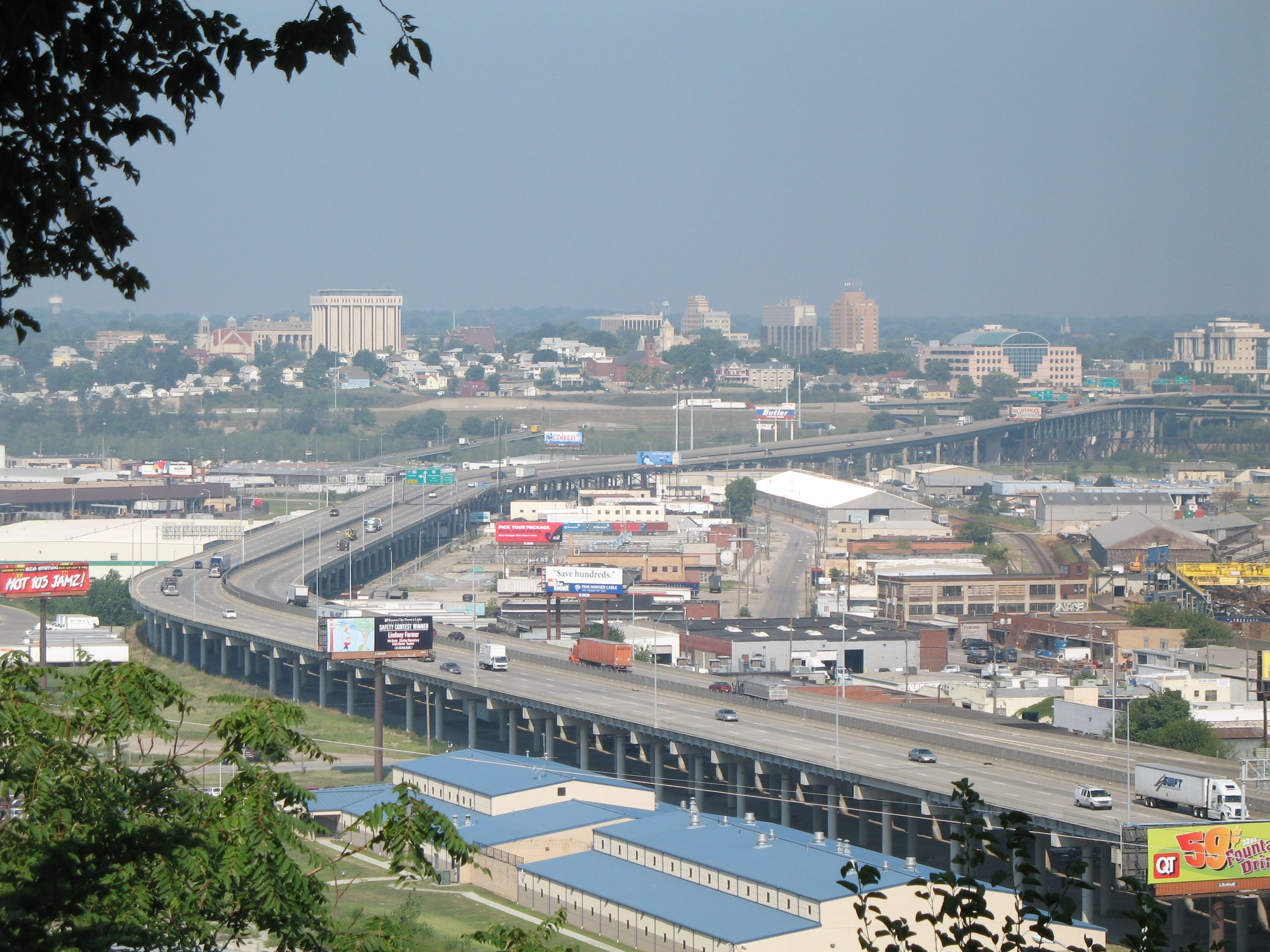
I-70 crossing on the Intercity Viaduct over the Kansas River from Kansas to Missouri in Kansas City

In Salina, I-70 intersects with the north terminus of I-135. In Topeka, I-70 intersects I-470, twice. At the eastern intersection, I-70 joins the Kansas Turnpike and becomes a toll road. This is one of only two sections of I-70 that are tolled, the other being I-70's concurrency with I-76 on the Pennsylvania Turnpike in southwest Pennsylvania. I-70 carries this designation from Topeka to Kansas City, the eastern terminus of the turnpike. About halfway between Topeka and Kansas City, I-70 passes through Lawrence (home to the University of Kansas). The tolled portion of the turnpike ends near Bonner Springs, just west of Kansas City. There is also a third auxiliary route in Topeka, I-335, which runs from I-470 south to meet up with I-35 in the Flint Hills town of Emporia. Just past the Bonner Springs Toll Plaza, I-70 crosses I-435 for the first time, which allows travelers to bypass the downtown traffic via I-435, which encircles the Kansas City metropolitan area. Further down the highway in Kansas City, approximately three miles (4.8 km) before the 18th Street Expressway, I-70 is intersected again by another auxiliary route. This route, I-635, runs from I-35 at its southern terminus up to I-29, just about five miles (8.0 km) across the Missouri River, at its northern terminus. From I-635 to just past the US 169 (7th Street) exit, I-70 runs adjacent Union Pacific Railroad's Armourdale Yard. Here, I-670 (also designated "Alternate 70" on some signs) diverges, providing a more direct route that rejoins I-70 proper a few miles east in Missouri. The highway passes over the former stockyards and railyard when it crosses the Kansas River on the Intercity Viaduct into Downtown Kansas City, Missouri.

=== Missouri ===
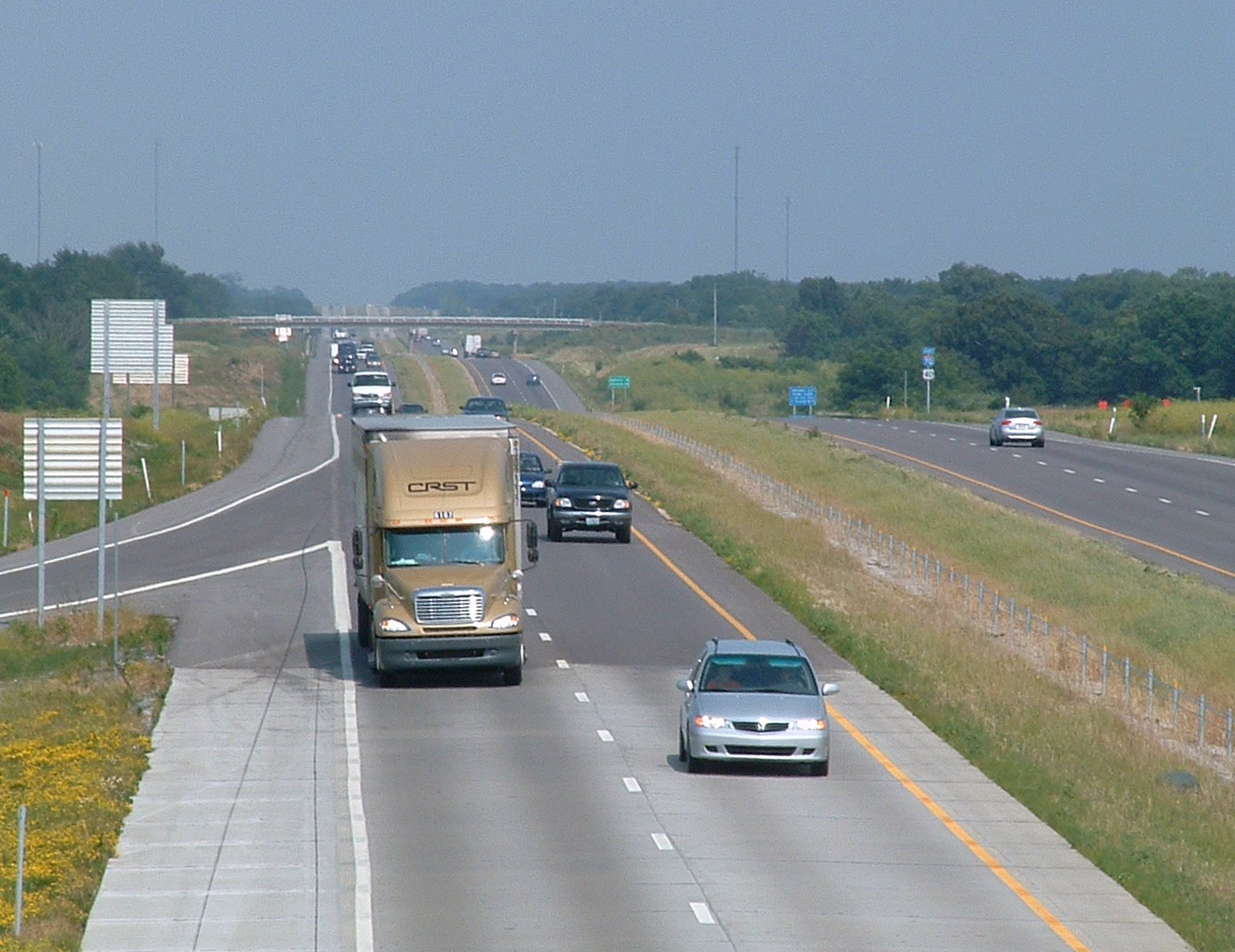
I-70 in Saline County, Missouri

After crossing the Intercity Viaduct, I-70 enters Missouri. It encounters a loop of freeways, called the Downtown Loop, which contains I-70 as well as I-35, I-670, US 24, US 40, US 71, and US 169. In the southern part of this loop, I-670 cuts directly through the downtown while I-70 bypasses the taller buildings a few blocks north near the Missouri River. Westbound I-670 is also designated Alternate I-70. Most of the Interstates in this loop are in their second mile, so all exits (no matter which Interstate the road carries) are numbered 2 and suffixed with every letter of the alphabet except for I, O, and Z, leading to the loop's nickname, the Alphabet Loop.

The section of I-70 in Downtown Kansas City is approximately the southern city limits of "City of Kansas" when it was incorporated in 1853. The first two auto bridges in Missouri mark the city's original boundaries with the Buck O'Neil Bridge (US 169) being the west boundary while the Heart of America Bridge (Route 9) is the east boundary. Another intersection of note is the second traverse of I-435. This is primarily notable because it immediately precedes the Truman Sports Complex (home of both Arrowhead and Kauffman stadiums) and also because the entrance ramps from I-435 northbound onto I-70 eastbound also serve as the exit ramps from I-70 into the Truman Sports Complex parking lots. This section of the Interstate is marked as the "George Brett Super Highway", named after the Kansas City Royals third-base player who played the entirety of his career (1973–1993) at Kauffman Stadium. The last Interstate intersection in the immediate Kansas City metro area is with I-470 in Independence.

After passing Kansas City, I-70 traverses the length of Missouri, west to east. It passes through the largest city between Kansas City and St. Louis, Columbia, which is about halfway between the two major cities and the home of the University of Missouri. The terrain is rolling with some hills and bluffs near rivers. I-70 also crosses the Missouri River twice (as did the original US 40)—at Rocheport, about 15 miles (24 km) west of Columbia, and at St. Charles, about 20 miles (32 km) northwest of St. Louis. Most of the highway on this stretch is four lanes. Various proposals have been made to widen it (at an estimated cost of $3.5 billion) including turning it into a toll road. I-70 eventually gets into Greater St. Louis, and US 40 splits to the south, along with US 61, which does not have a concurrency with I-70. In late 2009, the intersecting road was upgraded to Interstate standards along with the completion of the overhaul of I-64. After this interchange, I-70 intersects two auxiliary routes, I-270 and I-170. After passing several bedroom communities in north St. Louis County, I-70 enters the city limits of St. Louis. It turns east to cross the Mississippi River on the Stan Musial Veterans Memorial Bridge, connecting with an extension of I-44, which takes the former I-70 route through Downtown St. Louis to meet I-55 at its connection to the Poplar Street Bridge.

The 1985 World Series between the Kansas City Royals and St. Louis Cardinals was nicknamed the "I-70 Series" because St. Louis and Kansas City are the two endpoints of I-70 in Missouri, and the highway passes within sight of both the Royals' Kauffman Stadium and, at the time, the Cardinals' Busch Stadium.

=== Illinois ===
After crossing the Stan Musial Veterans Memorial Bridge, I-70 merges with I-55, while I-64 splits off I-55. When the routes intersect I-270, I-55 stays on its own pavement using the mileposts from the Poplar Street Bridge, while I-70 heads east on I-270's pavement using I-270's mileposts. Because of this arrangement, when I-55/I-70 intersects I-270 from the southeast, the exit number is 20 and, in the opposite direction, it is exit 15.

I-70 was rerouted from the Poplar Street Bridge to the Stan Musial Veterans Memorial Bridge north of Downtown St. Louis, which opened in February 2014.

I-70 passes through numerous county seats in Illinois, among them Vandalia, the state capital from 1818 to 1839. It runs concurrently with I-57 around Effingham and then proceeds east toward Indiana.

=== Indiana ===
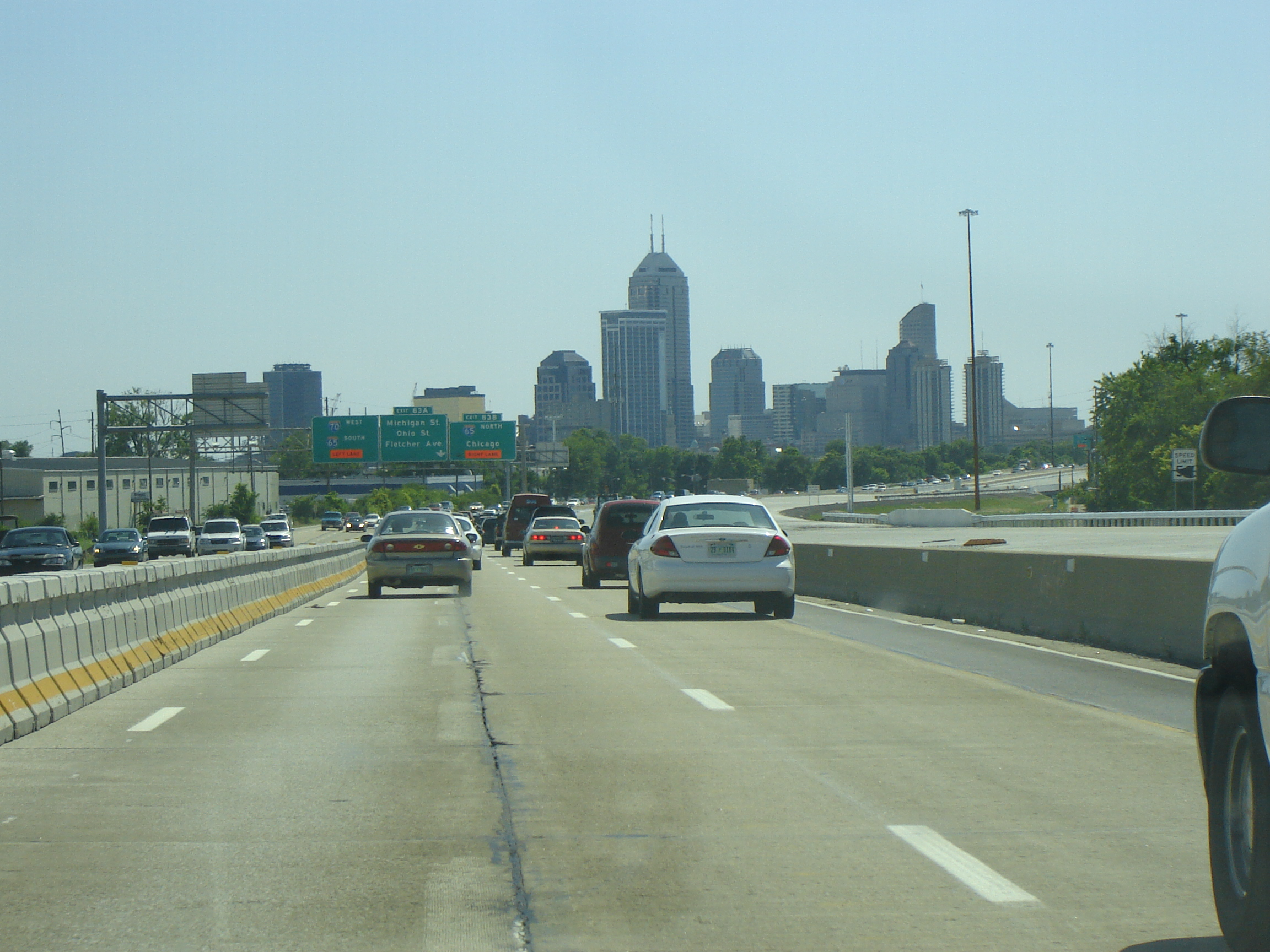
I-70 near its junction with I-65, east of Downtown Indianapolis, Indiana

I-70 enters Indiana just to the west of Terre Haute and then crosses the Wabash River before skirting the city's south side. After passing through miles of gently rolling terrain in rural west-central Indiana, the freeway approaches the major Indianapolis metropolitan area.

The main entrance to Indianapolis International Airport was relocated to I-70's exit 68 on November 11, 2008. Upon nearing the central business district of Indiana's capital city, the visages of Lucas Oil Stadium and the JW Marriott Indianapolis hotel, with the city's skyline as their backdrop, now dominate the view to the north from the freeway. After passing just to the south of the world headquarters for Eli Lilly and Company, I-70 and I-65 have a brief concurrency through the eastern side of Downtown Indianapolis. The junction points of these two major routes are known locally as the "South Split" and "North Split", respectively.

After passing through much of the near northeast side of Indianapolis, I-70 again encounters the I-465 beltway, which carries a multitude of unsigned U.S. Highways and Indiana state roads. I-70 continues on nearly due east from this point, first traveling through suburban Indianapolis and then transitioning into rural east central Indiana, where it passes just to the south of New Castle. Upon reaching the Richmond area, US 35 joins I-70 just before both routes leave Indiana together and enter Ohio.

=== Ohio ===
I-70 enters Ohio just east of the interchange with US 40 at Richmond, Indiana. Immediately to the east of this border, travelers notice a unique teal-blue arch that spans the width of the freeway, with a "Welcome to Ohio" greeting sign above the eastbound lanes. A sign thanking travelers for visiting Ohio is mounted on the other side of the arch for westbound travelers. Continuing eastbound, I-70 intersects I-75 north of Dayton, followed by I-675 on the east side of Dayton. Springfield is the next city, the site of Buck Creek State Park.

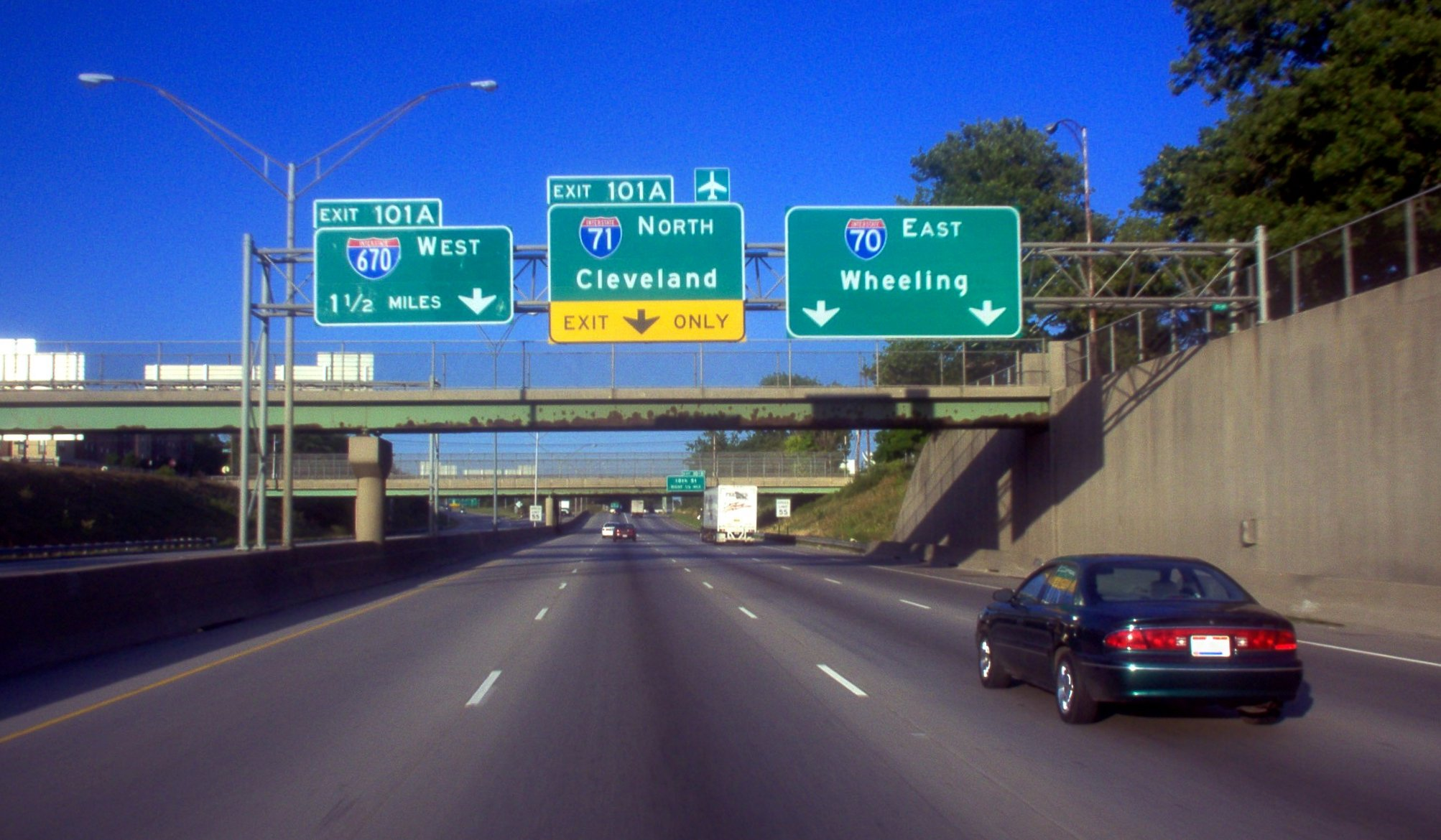
I-70 and I-71 intersection in Columbus, Ohio

I-70 then encounters Columbus. Columbus is bounded by I-270 and is roughly centered on the intersection of I-70 and I-71, which share the same asphalt through a notoriously congested 1.5-mile (2.4 km) stretch locally known as the "South Innerbelt" or, more commonly, "The Split". This stretch has I-71 concurrent with I-70, where I-71 enters and exits from opposite sides of I-70, causing traffic getting on I-70 from I-71 northbound to have to cross four lanes of I-70 traffic to continue on I-71. A similar issue is present for southbound I-71 traffic as well. The Split is being reconstructed ($1.4 billion) and is scheduled to be completed by mid-2026. I-670 connects John Glenn Columbus International Airport with I-270, I-71, and I-70. East of Columbus, I-70 passes through Zanesville and on to Cambridge, where it intersects I-77. Continuing on toward West Virginia, I-70 intersects I-470 just east of St. Clairsville. I-470 is primarily used for through traffic and to avoid The Winter Festival of Lights traffic during the Christmas season from Oglebay Park. In March 1995, a hole (from a former coal mine) opened up on the eastbound side of I-70 in Guernsey County near Old Washington and caused traffic to be rerouted onto US 40 between Old Washington and Cambridge for several months.

=== West Virginia ===
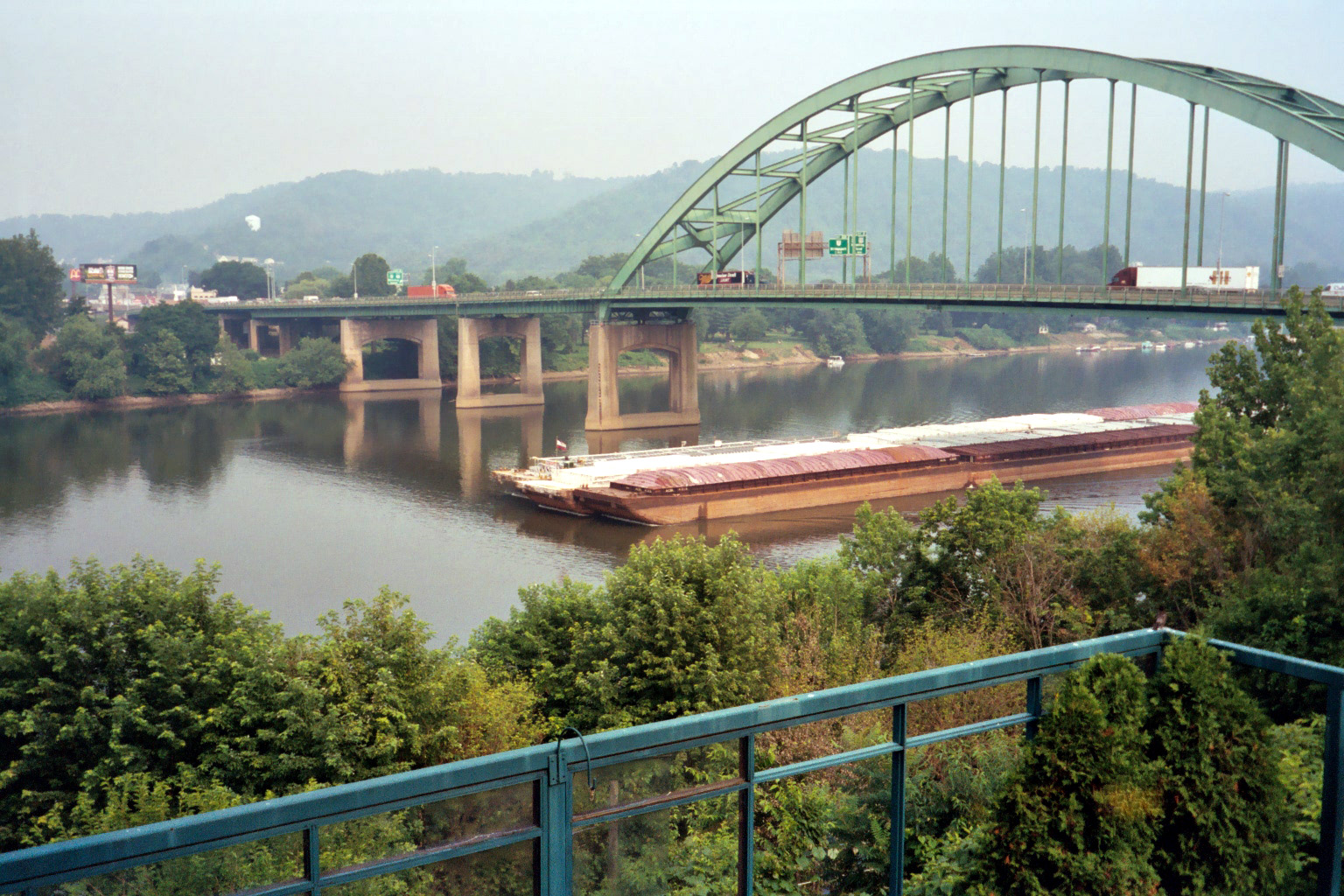
Crossing the Ohio River (Fort Henry Bridge) at Wheeling, West Virginia

The portion of I-70 in West Virginia crosses the Ohio River at Wheeling and runs through the Wheeling Tunnel. I-70 has only one throughlane in each direction at the tunnel. A major interchange was planned but never completed on the east side of the Wheeling Tunnel. Upon merging with I-470, I-70 goes uphill toward Dallas Pike. This part of the road is called "Two Mile Hill", which is known locally for the many accidents at the bottom of the hill. I-70 has brought major development in Ohio County, the only county the route passes through in West Virginia.. On the north side of the highway, a former strip mine was developed into a retail area called The Highlands. This stretch of I-70 is the shortest that I-70 is in any state, traveling only 15 miles (24 km) from the Ohio River to the Pennsylvania border.

=== Pennsylvania ===
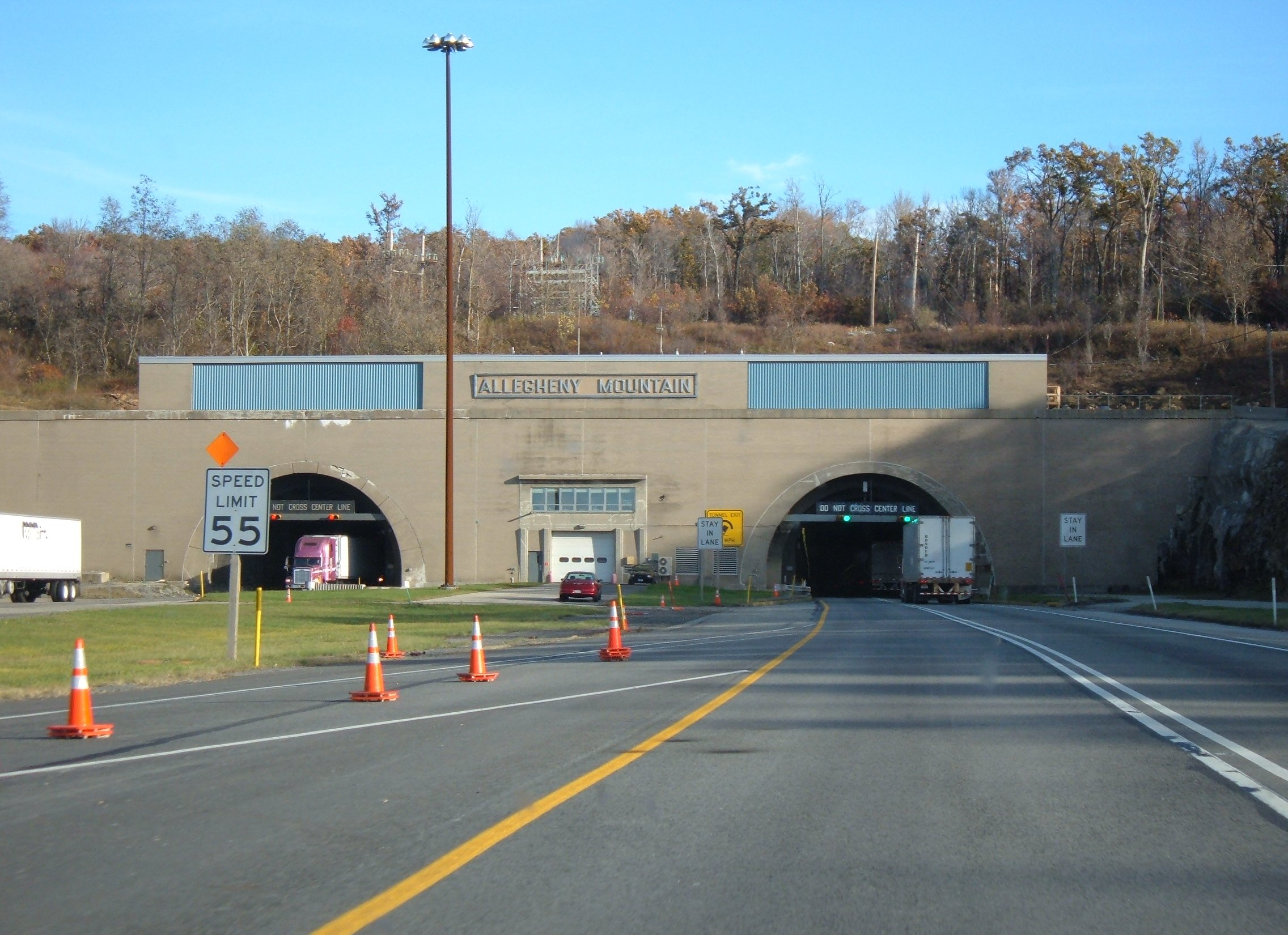
I-70/I-76 at the Allegheny Mountain Tunnel

I-70 was initially envisioned to go through Downtown Pittsburgh but now goes south of it. Its originally planned route was later incorporated into I-376, as well as parts of I-76 and I-79. I-70 also overlaps I-79 near the Pittsburgh suburb of Washington for three miles (4.8 km).

The 38 miles (61 km) of I-70 between Washington and New Stanton is a substandard section of the highway. This section of I-70 used to be Pennsylvania Route 71 (PA 71). It is characterized by sharp curves, limited sight distance, narrow shoulders, and lack of merge lanes at interchanges. Traffic on cloverleaf ramps must weave in the right throughlane of traffic due to the lack of a third lane for entering and exiting traffic. Other on- and offramps effectively function as right-in/right-out interchanges, forcing vehicles to weave in and out of the exit lane. The speed limit on this stretch is 55 mph (89 km/h).

Between New Stanton and Breezewood, I-70 runs concurrent with I-76 on the Pennsylvania Turnpike. This is one of only two tolled sections of I-70, the other being on the Kansas Turnpike between Topeka and Kansas City.

I-70 at the Breezewood exit

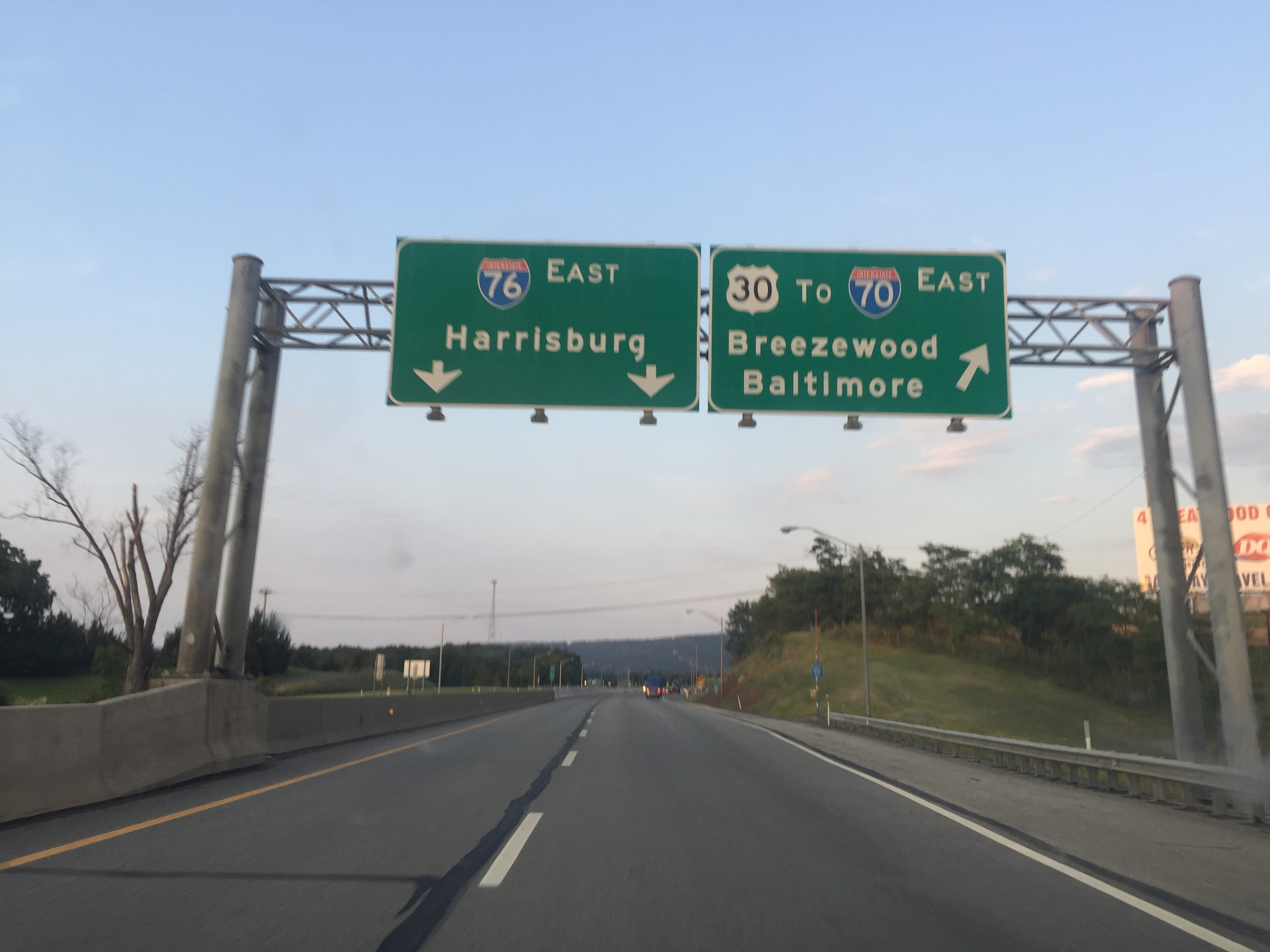
Exit split from I-76

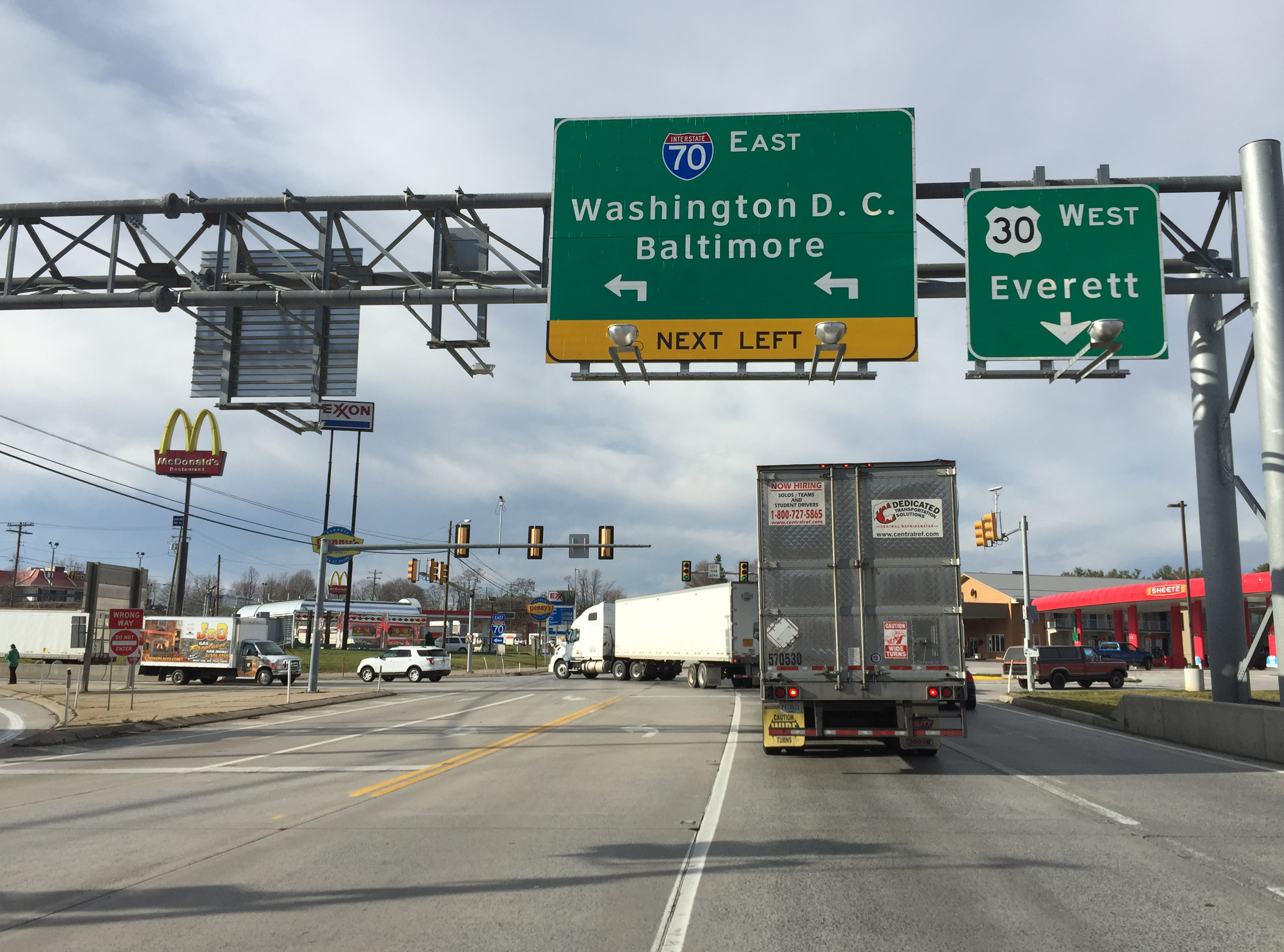
Interchange with US 30

At Breezewood, I-70 leaves the Pennsylvania Turnpike, and travels over part of an old turnpike alignment to a trumpet interchange. Here, I-70 travels west for a few blocks on US 30 past several traffic-lights, before heading south on its own alignment. This stretch of I-70 is one of the few gaps on the Interstate Highway System.

I-70 continues on almost due south from Breezewood to the Maryland state line. This section is posted at 55 mph (89 km/h) and is heavily patrolled. After the border, it meets I-68's eastern end and turns east toward Baltimore and Washington, DC.

=== Maryland ===
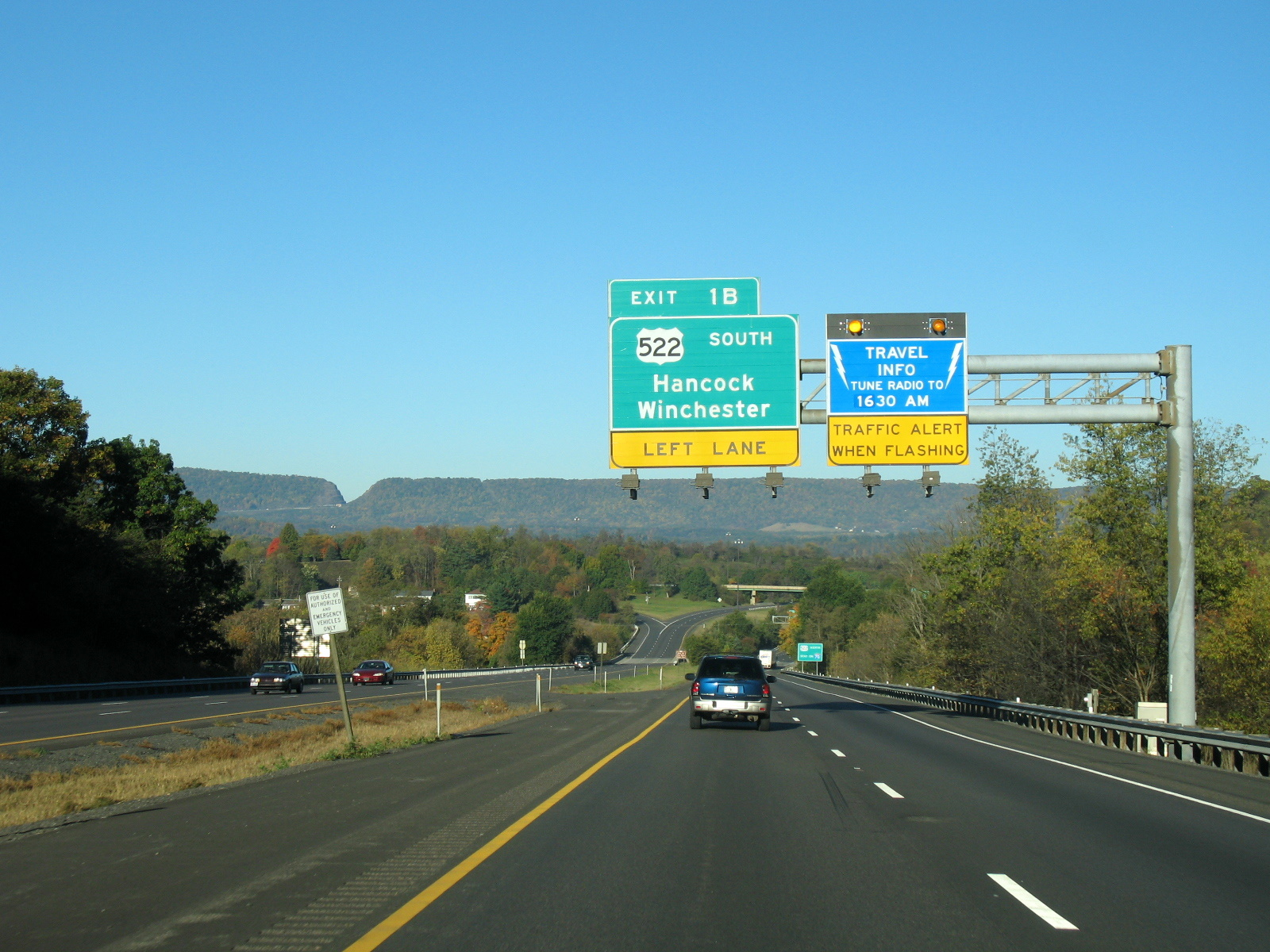
Westbound I-70 in Hancock, Maryland

In Maryland, I-70 runs from the Pennsylvania state line near Hancock east across the central portion of the state toward Baltimore, following the route of the National Road, now known as US 40. It is a major east–west highway in the state, serving the cities of Hagerstown and Frederick and bypassing Ellicott City. East of Frederick, the route was originally designated Interstate 70N (I-70N). The highway serves Washington, DC, via I-270, which was once designated Interstate 70S (I-70S). I-70 indirectly serves a branch of the Washington Metro at Shady Grove station via I-370, which only connects to I-270.

I-70 was planned to end at I-95 in Baltimore, but, due to local opposition, it was only built to MD 122. The section east of I-695 is now MD 570.

== History ==
Besides being the first Interstate to receive a contract for pavement, other oddities happened with I-70 as well.

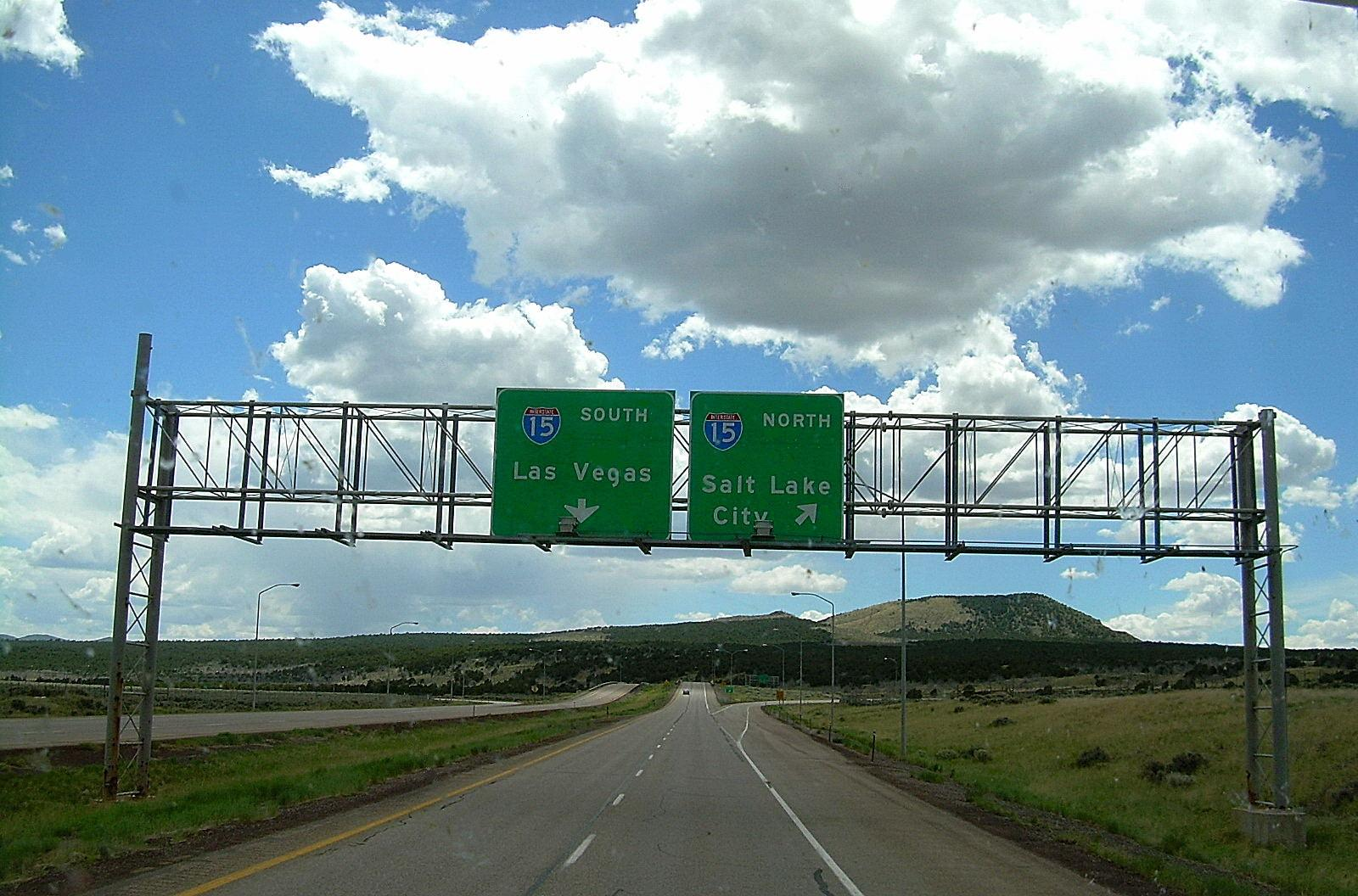
The western terminus in Utah

As first proposed, the western terminus of I-70 was to be Denver. Utah and Colorado, however, pressured the federal government to extend the planned freeway farther west, arguing a direct link between Denver and Salt Lake City was vital for an effective highway system. The proposal was to follow what is now US 6 west and connect to I-15 at Spanish Fork, Utah. Federal planners, influenced by the military, agreed to extend the proposed route of I-70, but not to serve Salt Lake City; the military wanted to better connect Southern California with the Northeastern U.S. This led to I-70's constructed route through the San Rafael Swell terminating at Cove Fort. Many motorists include I-70 as part of their cross-country drives between New York City and Los Angeles (which are accessible to I-70 via other Interstates).

Completed in 1992, the freeway through Glenwood Canyon Colorado was the last major section of freeway on I-70 to be completed and widely heralded as an environmental and engineering success.

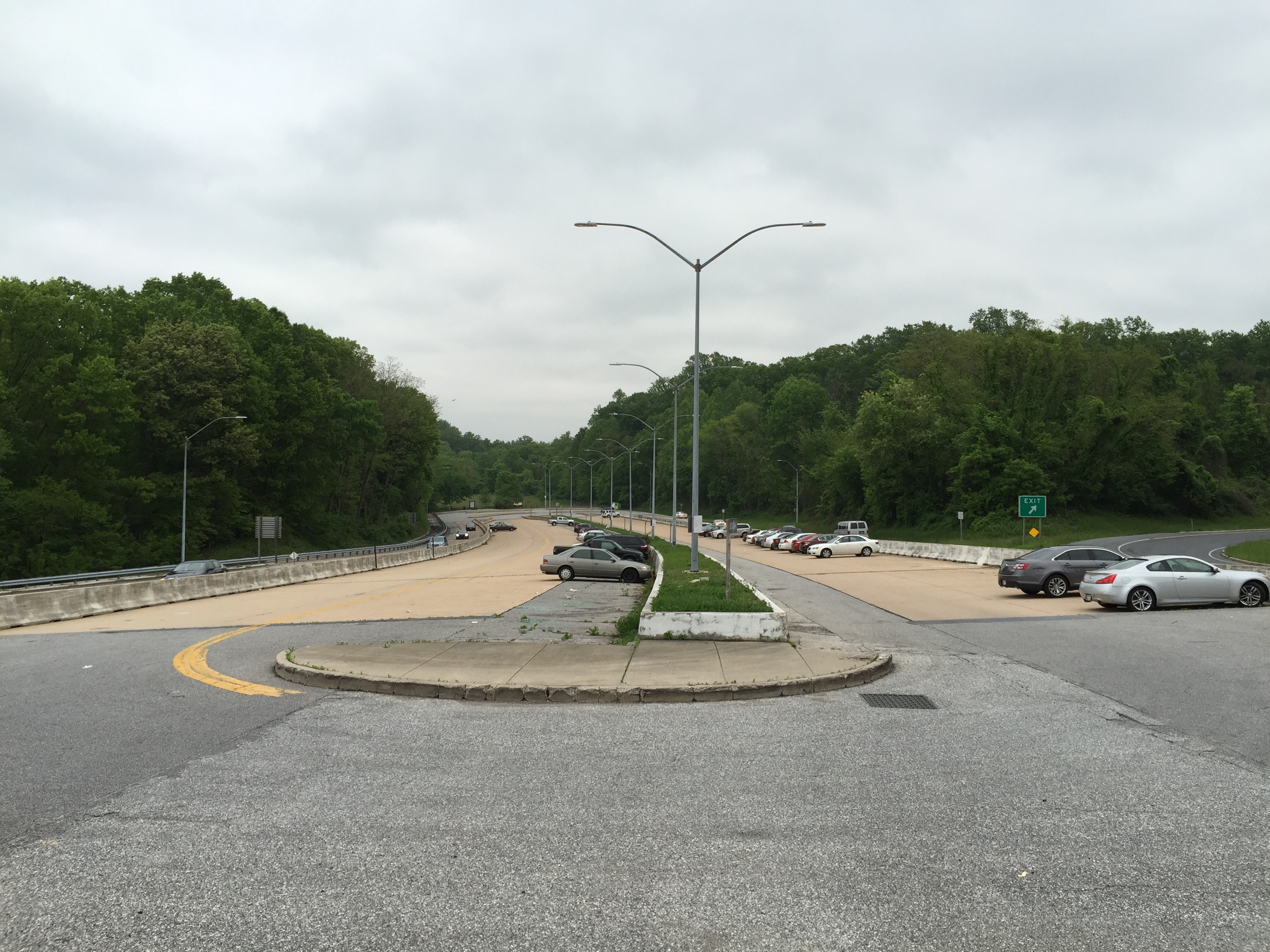
Eastern terminus of MD 570 (formerly I-70) at a park and ride facility in Maryland near MD 122

As a result of freeway revolts in the Baltimore area, I-70 was not completed east of MD 122 to its planned terminus at I-95 within the city of Baltimore, and it now ends at a four-way symmetrical stack interchange with I-695, the Baltimore Beltway. Until November 2014, I-70 ended at a park-and-ride lot at MD 122 as the freeway enters the city of Baltimore at exit 94. Commuters park on the pavement where high-speed freeway lanes were to be. The former freeway from I-695 to MD 122 is being converted into a two-lane parkway to be renamed Cooks Boulevard, maintained by the Maryland State Highway Administration.

The highway gave its name to the I-70 killer, a serial killer who committed a string of murders within a few miles of it in several Midwestern states in the early 1990s. No suspect has ever been apprehended despite the widespread publicity the murders generated, including their being featured several times on the television show America's Most Wanted and Unsolved Mysteries.

It also lends its name to the I-70 strangler, who murdered at least twelve boys and young men whose bodies were discovered along I-70. Though officially unsolved, it is believed that deceased businessman Herb Baumeister, a suspect in over a dozen homicides in Indiana, might have been the perpetrator.

John Allen Muhammad and Lee Boyd Malvo, the duo responsible for the DC sniper attacks, were apprehended at a rest stop on I-70 near Myersville, Maryland, in 2002.

The 1985 World Series was a contest between the St. Louis Cardinals and the Kansas City Royals and won by the Royals. As these cities are primarily connected by I-70, the media has often called the series and the two teams' interleague rivalry the I-70 Series.

== Junction list ==
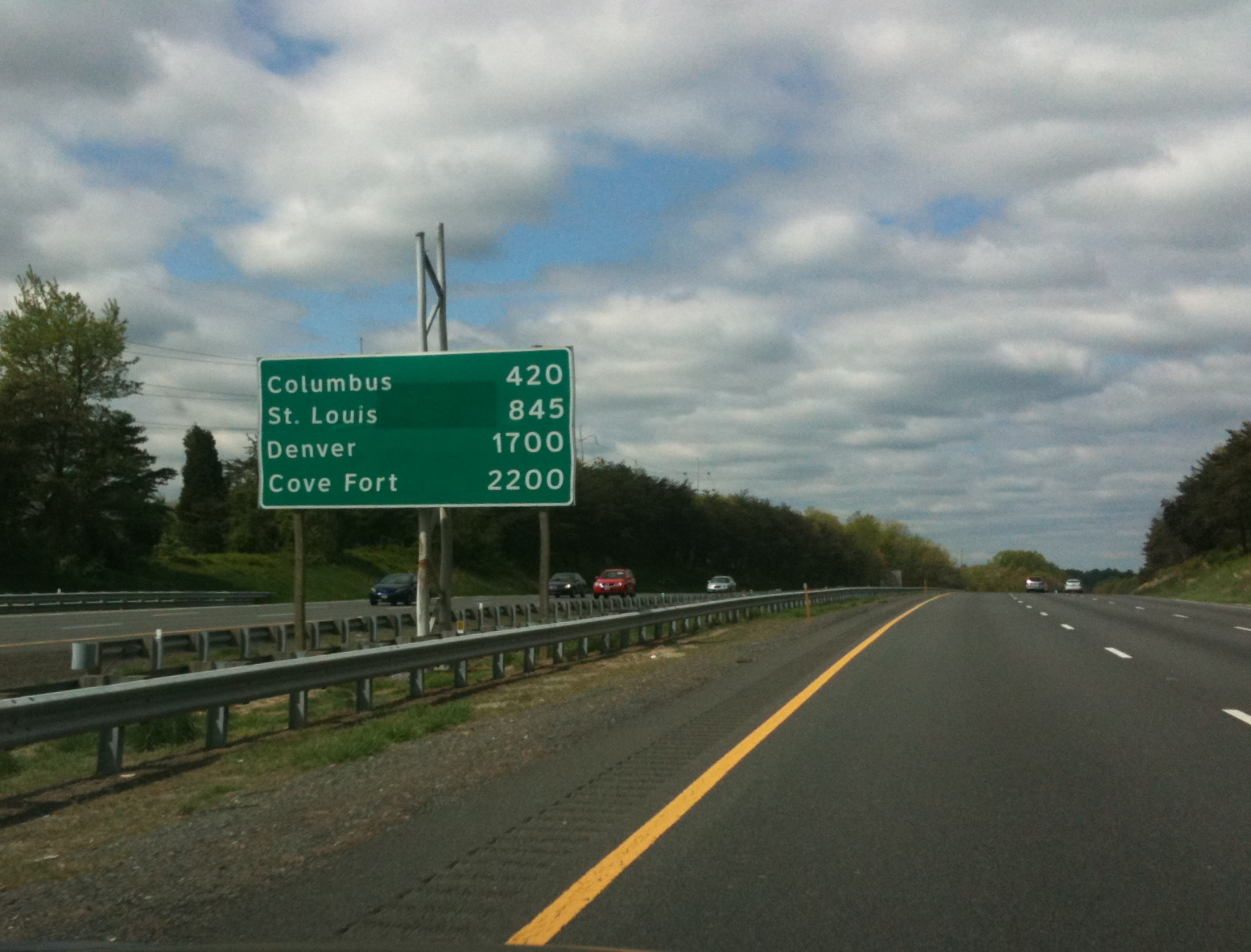
Mileage sign on I-70 west of I-695, Woodlawn, Maryland

Utah
I-15 south-southwest of Cove Fort
US 89 north-northeast of Sevier. The highways travel concurrently to Salina.
US 50 / US 89 in Salina. I-70/US 50 travels concurrently to south-southwest of Mack, Colorado.
US 6 / US 191 west of Green River. I-70/US 6 travels concurrently to south-southwest of Mack, Colorado. I-70/US 191 travels concurrently to west-southwest of Thompson Springs.
Colorado
US 6 / US 50 in Grand Junction
US 6 northeast of Palisade. The highways travel concurrently to Rifle.
US 6 in Chacra. The highways travel concurrently to Gypsum.
US 6 in Eagle-Vail
US 6 / US 24 northwest of Minturn. I-70/US 6 travels concurrently to Silverthorne.
US 6 north-northeast of Keystone. The highways travel concurrently to east of Idaho Springs.
US 40 east of Empire. The highways travel concurrently to east of Idaho Springs.
US 40 north of Evergreen
US 40 north of Evergreen. The highways travel concurrently to north-northwest of Genesee.
US 6 on the Golden–West Pleasant View line
US 40 in West Pleasant View
I-76 in Arvada
US 287 in Denver
I-25 / US 6 / US 85 / US 87 in Denver. I-70/US 6/US 85 travels concurrently through Denver.
I-270 / US 36 in Denver. I-70/US 36 travels concurrently to Byers.
I-225 on the Denver–Aurora city line
US 40 / US 287 in Aurora. The highways travel concurrently to Limon.
US 24 / US 40 / US 287 in Limon
US 24 / US 40 / US 287 east of Limon. I-70/US 24 travels concurrently to Seibert.
US 385 in Burlington
US 24 in Burlington. The highways travel concurrently to south-southwest of Levant, Kansas.
Kansas
US 83 north-northwest of Oakley
US 40 in Oakley. The highways travel concurrently to Topeka.
US 283 in WaKeeney
US 183 in Hays
US 281 south of Russell
I-135 / US 81 northwest of Salina
US 77 in Junction City
I-470 / US 75 in Topeka. I-70/US 75 travels concurrently through Topeka.
I-470 in Tecumseh
US 40 / US 59 in Lawrence
US 24 / US 40 / US 73 in Bonner Springs. I-70/US 24/US 40 travels concurrently to Kansas City, Kansas.
I-435 on the Edwardsville–Kansas City city line
I-635 in Kansas City
US 69 in Kansas City.
I-670 in Kansas City
US 69 / US 169 in Kansas City. I-70/US 169 travels concurrently to Kansas City, Missouri.
Missouri
I-35 in Kansas City. The highways travel concurrently through Kansas City.
I-29 / I-35 / US 24 / US 71 in Kansas City. I-70/US 71 travels concurrently through Kansas City.
I-435 in Kansas City
US 40 on the Kansas City–Independence city line
I-470 in Independence
US 40 in Grain Valley. The highways travel concurrently to Boonville.
US 65 south of Marshall
US 40 west of Columbia. The highways travel concurrently to Wentzville.
US 54 in Kingdom City
I-64 / US 40 / US 61 in Wentzville
I-270 in Bridgeton
US 67 in Bridgeton
I-170 in Berkeley
I-44 in St. Louis
Illinois
I-55 / I-64 / US 40 in East St. Louis. I-55/I-70 travels concurrently to northwest of Troy. I-70/US 40 travels concurrently to Troy.
I-255 in Collinsville
I-55 / I-270 northwest of Troy
US 40 northeast of Highland. The highways travel concurrently to north of Pocahontas.
US 40 northeast of Stubblefield
US 40 in Vandalia
US 51 in Vandalia
US 40 southwest of Brownstown
I-57 southwest of Effingham. The highways travel concurrently to Effingham.
US 45 in Effingham
US 40 east-northeast of Marshall. The highways travel concurrently to Terre Haute, Indiana.
Indiana
US 41 / US 150 in Terre Haute
US 231 in Cloverdale
I-74 / I-465 / US 36 / US 40 in Indianapolis
I-65 in Indianapolis. The highways travel concurrently through Indianapolis.
I-69 / I-465 / US 31 / US 36 / US 52 / US 421 in Indianapolis
US 35 in Richmond. The highways travel concurrently to north-northwest of Campbellstown, Ohio.
US 27 in Richmond
US 40 in Richmond
Ohio
US 127 west-southwest of Lewisburg
I-75 in Vandalia
I-675 northwest of Holiday Valley
US 68 southwest of Springfield
US 40 east of Springfield
US 42 southwest of Gillivan
I-270 in Columbus
I-670 in Columbus
US 40 in Columbus
US 62 in Columbus
I-71 in Columbus. The highways travel concurrently through Columbus.
US 23 / US 33 in Columbus
US 33 in Columbus
US 33 in Columbus
I-270 in Columbus
US 40 southwest of Gratiot
US 40 west-northwest of Zanesville
US 22 / US 40 west-southwest of Norwich
I-77 south-southeast of Cambridge
US 40 south of Old Washington. The highways travel concurrently to west-southwest of Morristown.
US 40 west-southwest of St. Clairsville
US 40 west of St. Clairsville
I-470 east-southeast of St. Clairsville
US 40 east-southeast of St. Clairsville
US 250 in Bridgeport
West Virginia
US 40 / US 250 on Wheeling Island. The highways travel concurrently to Wheeling.
US 40 in Wheeling
US 40 in Wheeling
I-470 in Wheeling
US 40 in Wheeling
Pennsylvania
US 40 southwest of Washington
I-79 north of Washington. The highways travel concurrently to east-southeast of Washington.
US 19 northeast of Washington
I-76 in New Stanton. The highways travel concurrently to southwest of Breezewood.
US 219 in Somerset
I-99 / US 220 north-northwest of Bedford
US 30 in Breezewood. The highways travel concurrently through Breezewood.
US 522 north of Warfordsburg. The highways travel concurrently to Hancock, Maryland.
Maryland
I-68 / US 40 north-northwest of Hancock. I-70/US 40 travels concurrently to south-southwest of Pecktonville.
I-81 in Halfway
US 40 south-southeast of Hagerstown
US 40 in Braddock Heights
US 15 / US 340 in Ballenger Creek
I-270 / US 40 in Frederick. I-70/US 40 travels concurrently to West Friendship.
US 29 in Ellicott City
I-695 in Woodlawn. Freeway continues as MD 570 to Baltimore city line.

== Auxiliary routes ==
A breakdown of I-70's auxiliary routes follows:

- I-270 is a short connector between I-70 and I-25 in Denver, Colorado. It also carries US 36 along its entire length.
- I-470 is a loop around the south side of Topeka, Kansas.
- I-670 is an alternate route of I-70 in Kansas City, Kansas, and Kansas City, Missouri.
- I-470 is a connector between I-70 and I-435 in southeastern Kansas City and Independence, Missouri.
- I-170 is a connector between I-64 and I-270 in St. Louis County, Missouri.
- I-270 loops around the city and county of St. Louis, Missouri. It is supplemented by I-255 to the east.
- I-270 is a beltway around Columbus, Ohio.
- I-670 is a 9.37-mile (15.08 km) highway beginning at I-70 west of Downtown Columbus, Ohio, and terminating at I-270 in eastern Columbus that also provides direct access to John Glenn Columbus International Airport from downtown.
- I-470 is a southern bypass around Wheeling, West Virginia.
- I-270 is a spur to Washington, DC. It was formerly designated I-70S.
- I-370 is a spur to Gaithersburg and Rockville, Maryland, from I-270. It never connects to I-70.
- I-170 was to have been a spur into downtown Baltimore, Maryland, but the short part that opened never connected to I-70 or to any other Interstate Highway. It was decommissioned in 1989, and US 40 is the current designation for the freeway.
