= Empire Towers =

- Artist: R.M. Fischer
- Year: 1985
- Type: Stainless steel, anodized aluminum, electric lights
- Dimensions: 4.9 m (16 ft)
- Location: Indianapolis Art Center; Indianapolis, Indiana, United States; 39°52′39.69″N 86°8′33.13″W
- Owner: Carl Solway Gallery

Empire Towers is a public artwork by sculptor R.M. Fischer. It currently resides on the grounds of the Indianapolis Art Center Indianapolis, Indiana, United States. It is on loan from the Carl Solway Gallery in Cincinnati, Ohio.

== Description ==
Empire Towers consists of two stainless steel grain silos standing tall on four poles. The tops of the silos are capped off with designs that are similar to those found on Royal Guard helmets.

== Artist ==
Sculptor R.M. Fischer uses objects found in the industrial, plumbing and electrical industries to sculpt, by hand, functional artworks. His early works appear metallic and thin, while his current works are seen as having "a decidedly feminine character and deals with a sculptural volume that is more Botero than Giacometti." Often abstract in appearance, his works often seem robot-like in what has been described as "futuristic and nostalgic." His artworks are found in public and private permanent collections worldwide including the Port Authority of New York and New Jersey and Union Square Colonnade in San Francisco's Union Square Park.

Empire Towers was commissioned by art gallery owner Carl Solway to encourage Fischer to create larger-scale sculptures. The "towers" are considered seminal works in Fischer's career, credited with triggering major commissions for the Massachusetts State House, Battery Park, MacArthur Park and the Kansas City Convention Center.

== Information ==
In 1985 Fischer's Empire Towers was chosen, along with artworks by nine other artists, for exhibition at the art symposium Sculpture Chicago `85.
