= Kansas City Southern Bridge =

Kansas City Southern Railway Bridge
- Coordinates: 39.1065°N 94.6173°W
- Carries: formerly 1 track of the Kansas City Southern Railway
- Crosses: Kansas River
- Locale: Kansas City, Kansas
- Maintained by: Kansas City Southern Railway (until closed)

Characteristics
- Design: Thru-Truss

History
- Opened: 1905
- Closed: 1983

Location
- Interactive map of Kansas City Southern Railway Bridge

The Kansas City Southern Bridge is a rail crossing of the Kansas River. It has two main spans, and a smaller span at the west end. It is a thru-truss, and closed to traffic. It was built in 1905, by the Kansas City Southern Railway, and was closed in 1983. The bridge's rails are cut off at each end. It survived the 1951 Kansas City flood. It is located about 100 feet (30 m) south of James Street over the Kansas River.

== See also ==
- Kansas City Southern Railroad Bridge, Cross Bayou, Shreveport, Louisiana
