= Lewis and Clark Viaduct =

Viaducts that cross the Kansas River

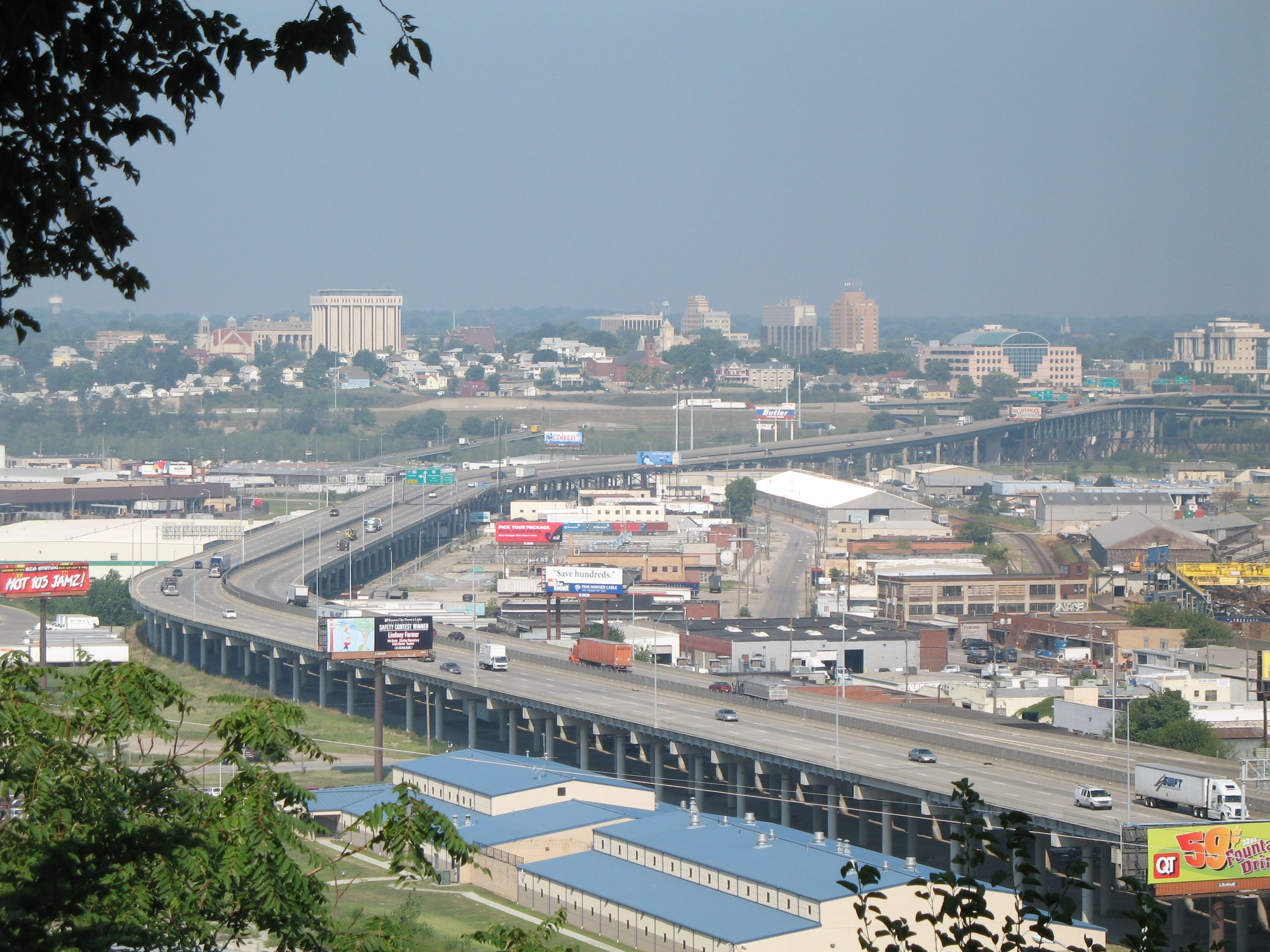
- View of the eastbound viaduct in West Bottoms; the since demolished westbound deck truss can be seen in the distance
- Coordinates: 39.1133°N 94.6149°W
- Carries: 7 lanes of I-70 / US 24 / US 40 / US 169 / Lewis and Clark Trail (3 lanes westbound and 4 lanes eastbound on the upper level); Kaw River Loop (eastbound lower level)
- Crosses: Kansas River, West Bottoms, railroad tracks
- Locale: Kansas City, Kansas–Kansas City, Missouri
- Maintained by: KDOT and MoDOT

Characteristics
- Design: various
- Width: 52 ft (15.8 m)
- Longest span: 3,777 ft (1,151.1 m)
- Clearance above: 29 ft (8.8 m)

History
- Opened: January 29, 1907; 118 years ago (original; since converted eastbound); November 12, 1962; 63 years ago (westbound)

Statistics
- Daily traffic: 23,500 (2008)
- Toll: Historical, abolished in 1918

Location
- Interactive map of Lewis and Clark Viaduct

The Lewis and Clark Viaduct (previously the Intercity Viaduct and historically the Interstate Viaduct; also known as the 6th Street Viaduct or Woodsweather Bridge) are two nine span viaducts that cross the Kansas River in the United States. Designed by Waddell and Hedrick, the first viaduct, a four-lane, deck truss bridge, opened to the public on January 29, 1907, the second bridge, also of the deck truss design, opened to the public on November 12, 1962. It rises above the West Bottoms, and several sets of railroad tracks. The 1907 viaduct is notable for being the first roadway bridge to connect Kansas City, Missouri, with Kansas City, Kansas, non-stop all the way across. It is about 1.5 miles (2.4 km) long and carries Interstate 70/U.S. Route 24/U.S. Route 40/U.S. Route 169 (I-70/US 24/US 40/US 169). The I-670 Viaduct serves as a complementary to the viaduct, it was built in 1990 to the south.

== History ==
=== Early 20th century ===
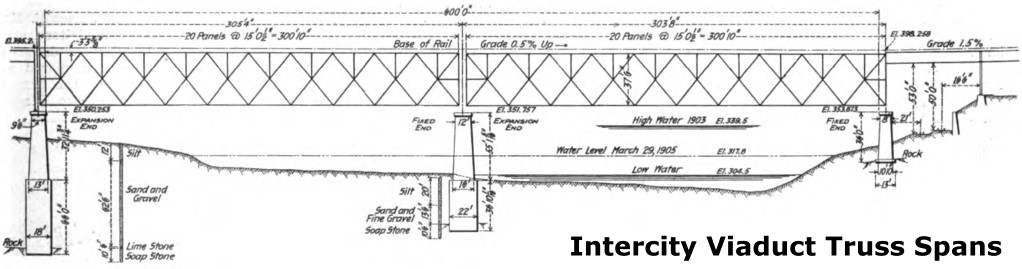
Blueprint of the Kaw River deck truss

The great flood of 1903 inundated all of the West Bottoms, leaving only one of 17 bridges in place that spanned the Kansas River sound enough for use. The need for an viaduct high enough above the flood level, that crossed the Kansas River from Kansas City, Missouri, with bluffs, to the high ground on the Wyandotte County side was recognized. Following this, plans were considered for the building of a new viaduct. Data secured showed there was enough traffic to warrant the building of the viaduct by a private enterprise and capital investment. The bridge design was finalized by the engineering firm Waddell and Hedrick in August 1903. Franchises were secured in September 1904 and successfully financed in early 1905. Groundbreaking ceremonies for construction of the Kansas River west pier began on August 9, 1905. By November, concrete for the piers carrying the deck truss over the Kansas River were already being poured. On February 22, 1906, the first steel land span was completed. By April, the deck truss bridge over the Kansas River was largely completed.

On December 18, the final of the viaducts girder spans were completed. The Intercity (Sixth Street) Viaduct was opened on January 29, 1907. It had a pedestrian walkway, two lanes for wagon traffic, and a pair of streetcar tracks. The viaduct was built in 17 months, and traveled from 6th and Bluff streets in Kansas City, Missouri, to 4th and Minnesota Avenue in Kansas City, Kansas, a distance of 8,400 feet (2,600 m). Of that, 4,031 feet (1,229 m) were in Missouri and 3,742 feet (1,141 m) in Kansas. When it opened, it was 1 3/4 miles (2.8 km) long. It was constructed with v-lacing and has lattice built-up members. Just a year later the Truss span proved its resistant design and survived its first flood.

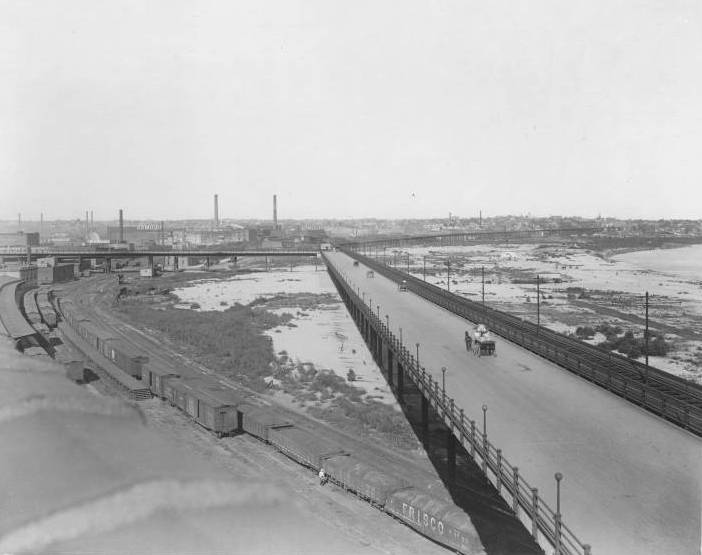
The Intercity Viaduct in 1908, streetcar tracks in view at right

Rather than be forced to pay a toll, drivers simply shunpiked the viaduct. Most did this by traveling on the nearby James Street Bridge, which had no tolls, in order to travel through West Bottoms to 6th and Bluff streets. This caused the bond holders to foreclose, and the enterprise went bankrupt in 1911, effectively closing it to vehicular traffic. The bondholders proposed to demolish the bridge and sell its trusses for scrap metal; these plans were ultimately rejected.

In January 1917, roughly 10 years after the bridge opened, the Kansas Legislature passed a bill giving the Kansas side authority to contract with Kansas City, Missouri. With this act, Kansas City, Kansas, could issue bonds for the purpose of purchasing the Interstate Viaduct for free traffic, this was also done so street car service could be restored. The purchase cost $1,775,000 (equivalent to $28.6 million in 2024) in bargain money, half of the original cost to construct the viaduct. Of the money, Kansas City, Missouri, paid 56 percent, while Kansas City, Kansas paid only 44 percent. In a short ceremony on October 30, 1918, a ribbon-cutting ceremony was held at the state line was led by Mayor Harry Mendenhall of Kansas City, Kansas, and Acting Mayor F.G. Robinson of Kansas City, Missouri, formally reopening the viaduct to traffic.

In 1919, intersections with side roads on the viaduct began to be permanently closed in order to increase safety. The last of these were closed in 1922.

In 1929 announced a plan to add a second level to the truss portion. Construction on a new lower roadway began in early 1930, and would serve as a truck bypass of the upper deck, which would allow the remaining automobiles to have their speed limit raised to be higher than before. This new roadway opened on September 23, 1930. The project also involved constructing a new roadway underneath the viaduct all the way to East Ohio Avenue. With this project, it became possible to increase the speed limit of the upper deck, and in late 1931 legislation was passed to adjust the speed limit from 30 to 40 miles per hour (48 to 64 km/h); this went into effect later that year.

The viaduct's original designers had provided extra space for potential expansion of the deck, though whether it would be for roadway or streetcar expansion had not been determined. In August 1933, city planners began planning to modernize the viaduct, widening the auto roadway to have two extra lanes that did not exist before. In March 1936, work began on this project. It would also involve removing pedestrian walkway and streetcar tracks to allow for the extra two lanes; the latter had already been replaced by a contemporary bus system however. All four lanes were concurrently open by November 30, 1936. With this upgrade, US 40 and US 24 could be routed over it. Later, the city also replaced the old lighting with new sodium-vapor illumination cast on cross arms 26 feet (7.9 m) over the vehicle deck.

In 1939, part of the viaduct was modernized. In 1942, the land adjacent to the viaduct was relandscaped as part of a beautification project.

=== Late 20th century ===
In 1950, the bridge approaches were modified, in addition, four emergency telephones were placed onto it. The viaduct survived the 1951 Great Kansas City flood; it was also the only bridge on the river to remain open to traffic during it.

Beginning in the late 1940s, various proposals were made to connect the viaduct to a grade-separated freeway. By the 1950s, construction began on this highway, I-70, which was a part of the newly formed Interstate Highway System, allowing drivers to cross high stretches of land easily without crossing any at-grade intersections. In 1957, as part of a related project to rehabilitate the James Street Bridge, the lower deck of the bridge began to be raised upward, lowering the clearance in the process. This was completed in 1959. Soon after this, a second viaduct began to be built, as the first bridge was inadequate to accommodate the increased traffic that it would likely carry on its own. On November 12, 1962, the new Intercity Viaduct was opened, with a ribbon-cutting ceremony led by Mayors Paul F. Mitchum and H. Roe Bartle. It was named in honor of Meriwether Lewis and William Clark, who led the Lewis and Clark Expedition in 1804. It was built to the north of the first viaduct and had multiple differences. It was named in honor of Lewis and Clark. It was taller, used bolted truss connections, and only contained a single deck. Additionally, it had a small single-lane truss that stuck out from the side near the Broadway Boulevard intersection; this served as an exit ramp onto the Fairfax Trafficway. It only has three lanes, one less than the eastbound structure, though they are wider. The second span had cost $8 million (equivalent to $63.3 million in 2024) to construct. After westbound traffic began moving over the Lewis and Clark Viaduct, the Intercity viaduct was closed for a significant renovation. This involved tubbing off all of the old steel piers and replacing them with modern concrete piers, replacing its deck, completely demolishing part of the land span on the Kansas side order to construct an interchange, and demolishing then reconstructing parts of the viaduct in order to allow for the addition of on-ramps to serve as exits for I-70. On December 11, 1963, at 11 a.m., the old viaduct opened to eastbound I-70 traffic. The renovations had cost $1,900,000.

On January 25, 1969, both structures were officially rededicated as the Lewis and Clark Viaduct, as an act of legislation between Kansas and Missouri. This was first suggested in January 1966, though was delayed a couple of years.

In 1972, modifications were made to eastbound viaduct in order to prevent traffic onto the westbound one.

In 1978, the viaduct became part of the Lewis and Clark Trail.

In October 1979, work to redeck the eastbound viaduct began. In May 1981, a 1,000-foot (300 m) stretch of the westbound viaduct was reconstructed, despite only being 18 years old, it was not designed the same way as the other sections, did not meet modern steel standards, and had prematurely deteriorated because of this. Two eastbound lanes were reopened in October 1981, generally completing its part of the project. At this point, the westbound viaduct was closed so it could be redecked and have its I-70 ramp reconstructed with a third beam; the former was completed in 1982, making it a redundant structure. Additionally, the westbound ramps onto the Fairfax Trafficway, Washington Boulevard, and Minnesota Avenue, and the eastbound ramp onto the Fairfax Trafficway were given major repairs. Work on the redecking the westbound span was completed in 1984.

In 1986, the eastbound I-70 ramp was reconstructed with a third beam, like its westbound equivalent two years earlier; this made it a redundant structure. In addition, the westbound ramp onto Washington Avenue was repaired again, alongside its eastbound equivalent. In 1987, the eastbound span was rehabilitated, also as part of this, the eastbound ramp onto the Fairfax Trafficway and westbound ramp onto Minnesota Avenue were repaired. In 1988, after one of its supports was damaged by arson, the eastbound viaduct was closed for emergency repairs. In 1989, the eastbound ramp, onto the Fairfax Trafficway and westbound ramp onto Washington Boulevard were reconstructed. In 1990, the eastbound bridge's deck was repaired. In 1991, the viaduct became part of US 169. Both viaducts survived the Great Flood of 1993. In 1992, a project began to reconstruct the viaducts near the Buck O'Neil Bridge. It involved narrowing the roadway near the I-35 overpass to two lanes westbound and three lanes eastbound, though with new shoulders added. Work was completed in 1994.

=== 21st century ===
In 1999, construction work was started on a project to redeck the lower level of the eastbound viaduct to serve pedestrian traffic. It was completed in 2000. In 2002, the eastbound viaduct was repaired, the eastbound and westbound ramps onto Washington Boulevard, Fairfax Trafficway and I-70, in addition the westbound ramp on Minnesota Avenue were repaired. In 2003, the both viaducts' had their deck drainage extended to the lower chord in certain areas to reduce water damage. In 2004, the westbound viaduct had numerous cracks repaired, and its piers were coated in concrete. In 2005, the eastbound I-70 ramp was repaired. In 2006, repairs were made to the expansion joints of both viaducts. On January 29, 2007, the eastbound viaduct celebrated its centennial; several people gathered from West Bottoms on that day, holding lights to honor the bridge. In 2012, a deck patching and overlay project was started on the eastbound span. It was completed in fall 2012.

By the late 2000s, both viaducts had deteriorated significantly, while maintenance did not decrease their structural integrity, they required nearly $1,000,000 a year to keep in a state of competence. They were also considered functionally obsolete due to lacking emergency shoulders among many other things, resulting in the snarling of traffic when an accident or other obstruction occurred. On February 4, 2018, phase 1 of the project was started, and the westbound span was closed in order to demolish and rebuild a 0.58-mile (0.93 km) segment of it, from the 3rd Street intersection to the end of crossing the railroad tracks. In addition, modifications were made to the nearby roadway from there to Broadway Boulevard. After already removing the concrete segment, the Kansas River truss was demolished with explosives at around 8:30 on June 2, 2018. Work transitioned from deconstructing to reconstructing in November 2018. it was delayed due to the 2019 Midwestern U.S. floods. The bridge was reopened on January 23, 2021. Only one week after reopening, one of the westbound viaducts extant approaches were damaged by a truck that crashed into a guardrail at a sharp angle, along with other cars that fell off. On March 15, 2021, a reopening ceremony was held by KDOT secretary Julie Lorenz and U.S. representative Sharince Davids. The project ultimately cost $65,000,000 (equivalent to $74 million in 2024), of which $58,400,000 was federally funded and $6,500,000 million was state paid (equivalent to $66.5 million and $7.4 million in 2024, respectively).

The reconstruction required approximately 8,800,000 pounds (4,000,000 kg) of structural steel, 5,400 feet (1,600 linealm) of concrete girders, 21,000 cubic yards (16,000 m^{3}) of concrete and 310,000,000 pounds (140,000,000 kg) of reinforcing steel. These new piers were constructed in a way so that the old ones did not need to be immediately demolished. They were also more complex, larger, and wider than the old ones. The bridge's lighting was upgraded and expanded across the bridge, previously only he concrete segments had it. Lighting was also added to the Kansa River segment, and the piers were widened to add an adequate shoulder, additionally, repairs were made to other parts of the viaduct.

The eastbound span was closed for resurfacing in October 2021, and emergency repairs to its Gusset plates in September 2024.

=== Future ===
Two future construction projects are currently planned for the crossing.

The first of these would rebuild the eastbound viaducts truss over the Kansas River. Like the original westbound truss, it is considered functionally obsolete, with structure lacking shoulders, and narrow travel lanes. This will result in the closure of eastbound traffic in a similar manner to the westbound span when it was rebuilt. It would also build a dedicated span to act as a walkway that will lie underneath the rebuilt bridge's pier.

The second of these will build dual two lane flyover ramps onto I-70, which will replace the existing left hand exit westbound and one lane entrance eastbound. After completion, the old left hand exit westbound and one lane turn on-ramp eastbound will be demolished. The westbound offramp in particular is dangerous, as a high number of unfamiliar drivers cause accidents due to its confusing left hand exit and lack of shoulders. The westbound viaduct layover was planned during its reconstruction, however, it was not done due to funding constraints. This is not an issue that the eastbound on-ramp has, due to its lower grade, warning beacons, and being a right hand exit. However, it is only one lane wide, meaning it does not meet current Interstate Highway standards.
