= Missouri Pacific Bridge =

Missouri Pacific Railroad Bridge
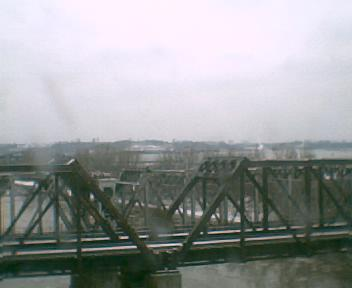
- Missouri Pacific Bridge in foreground, Union Pacific Intermodel Bridge in background
- Coordinates: 39.0981°N 94.6123°W
- Carries: formerly 1 track of Missouri Pacific Railroad, now carries 1 track of Union Pacific railroad
- Crosses: Kansas River
- Official name: UPRR Kansas River Bridge 2
- Maintained by: Union Pacific Railroad

Characteristics
- Design: 4 span Thru-Truss

History
- Opened: 1909

The Missouri Pacific Railroad bridge was built in 1909, by the MoPac. In 1984 it was merged with Union Pacific in the Missouri Pacific-Union Pacific merger. The bridge is upstream of I-670, over the Kansas River. It is open to traffic.

It is the sister bridge to the Union Pacific Intermodal Bridge.
