= Avon, Colorado =

Town in Colorado, US

- Home rule town
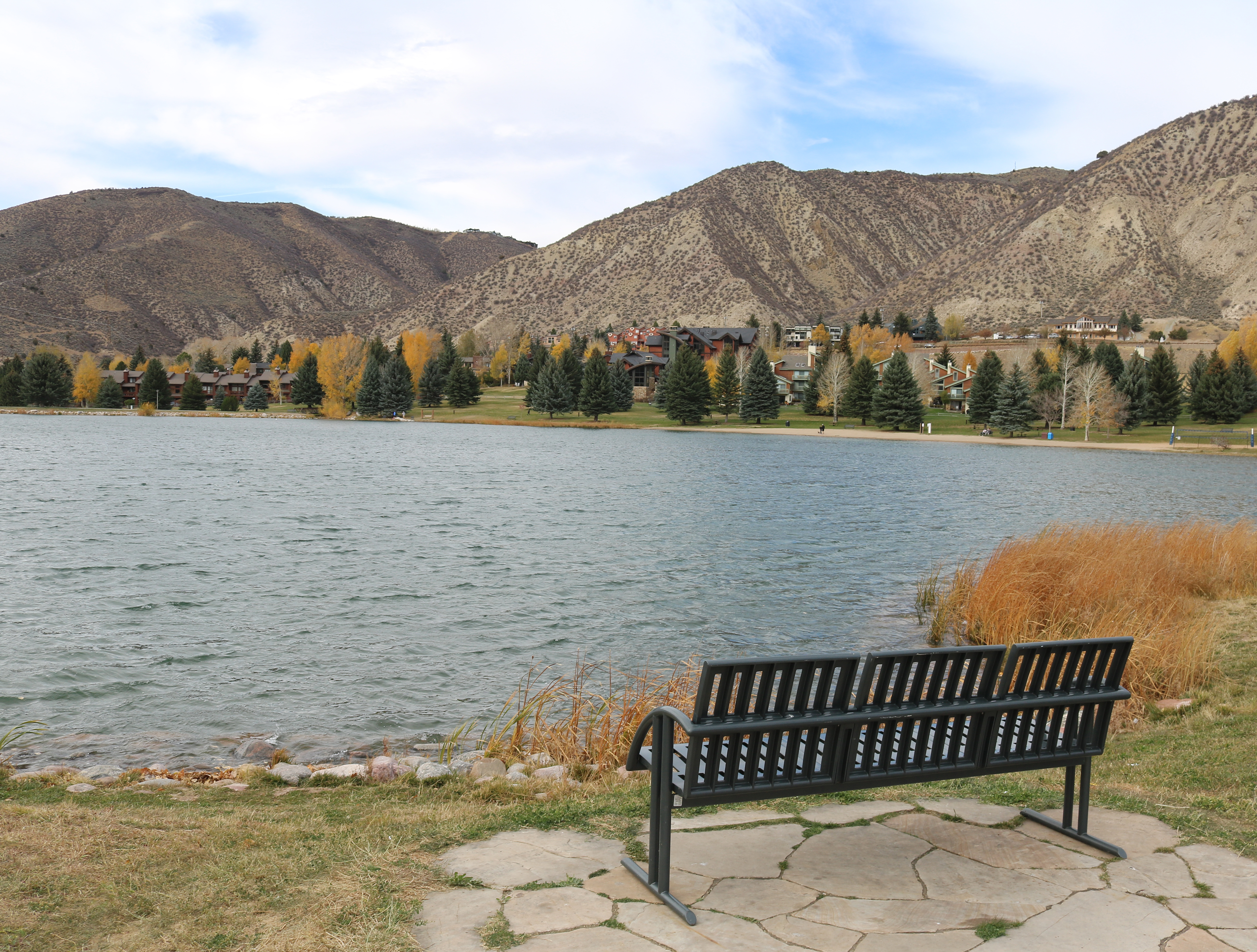
- Nottingham Lake in Avon

- Flag Logo

- Location of the Town of Avon in Eagle County, Colorado
- Coordinates: 39°37′55″N 106°29′22″W
- Country: United States
- State: Colorado
- County: Eagle

Government
  - Type: Home rule town

Area
  - Total: 8.424 sq mi (21.819 km^{2})
  - Land: 8.349 sq mi (21.625 km^{2})
  - Water: 0.075 sq mi (0.194 km^{2})
- Elevation: 7,431 ft (2,265 m)

Population (2020)
  - Total: 6,072
  - Density: 727/sq mi (281/km^{2})
- Time zone: UTC−07:00 (MST)
  - Summer (DST): UTC−06:00 (MDT)
- ZIP Code: 81620
- Area code: 970
- GNIS town ID: 2411658
- FIPS code: 08-04110
- Website: www.avon.org

Avon is a home rule town located in Eagle County, Colorado, United States. The town population was 6,072 at the 2020 United States census. The town is a part of the Edwards, CO Micropolitan Statistical Area. Avon is the gateway to the Beaver Creek Resort which lies about two miles (3 km) south of the town. It was the previous site of Vail Resorts before the company moved its physical headquarters to Broomfield, Colorado, in 2006. The town is the home of Liberty Skis, an independent ski manufacturing company.

== History ==
The town began as a railway station in 1889. Originally spelled "Avin", the name was later changed to "Avon". Avon was incorporated in August 1978.

== Geography ==
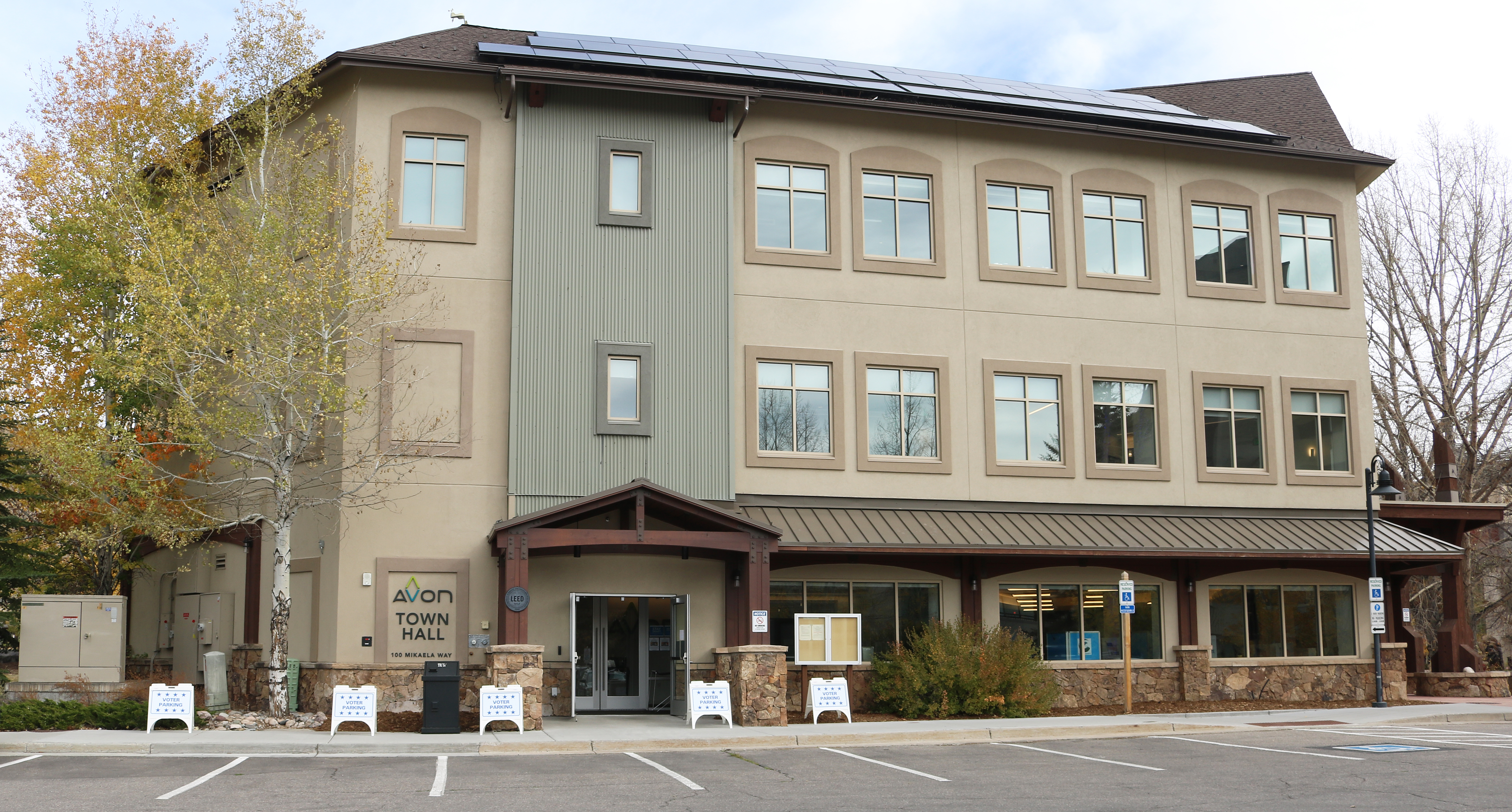
Avon Town Hall

Avon is located along Interstate 70, U.S. Highway 6, and the Eagle River.

At the 2020 United States census, the town had a total area of 5,392 acres (21.819 km^{2}) including 48 acres (0.194 km^{2}) of water. The town rests at 7,430 feet (2265 m) elevation.

One popular destination within Avon is Nottingham Lake, which offers a beach area and paddleboard/pedalboat rentals in the summer. Next to the lake is the Harry A. Nottingham Park and Pavilion, which serves as the location for an annual art festival, a summer concert series, and other activities.

== Demographics ==
Historical population
Census	Pop.	Note	%±
1980	640		—
1990	1,798		180.9%
2000	5,561		209.3%
2010	6,447		15.9%
2020	6,072		−5.8%
U.S. Decennial Census

=== 2020 census ===
As of the 2020 census, Avon had a population of 6,072. The median age was 35.6 years. 20.6% of residents were under the age of 18 and 8.1% of residents were 65 years of age or older. For every 100 females there were 117.6 males, and for every 100 females age 18 and over there were 122.0 males age 18 and over.

87.5% of residents lived in urban areas, while 12.5% lived in rural areas.

There were 2,375 households in Avon, of which 31.8% had children under the age of 18 living in them. Of all households, 43.3% were married-couple households, 27.1% were households with a male householder and no spouse or partner present, and 19.2% were households with a female householder and no spouse or partner present. About 23.6% of all households were made up of individuals and 4.4% had someone living alone who was 65 years of age or older.

There were 3,804 housing units, of which 37.6% were vacant. The homeowner vacancy rate was 0.6% and the rental vacancy rate was 4.6%.

Racial composition as of the 2020 census
Race	Number	Percent
White	3,768	62.1%
Black or African American	68	1.1%
American Indian and Alaska Native	43	0.7%
Asian	157	2.6%
Native Hawaiian and Other Pacific Islander	4	0.1%
Some other race	1,115	18.4%
Two or more races	917	15.1%
Hispanic or Latino (of any race)	2,365	38.9%

=== 2000 census ===
As of the 2000 census, there were 5,561 people, 1,890 households, and 971 families residing in the town. The population density was 695.9 inhabitants per square mile (268.7/km^{2}). There were 2,557 housing units at an average density of 320.0 per square mile (123.6/km^{2}). The racial makeup of the town was 72.52% White, 0.79% African American, 0.68% Native American, 0.99% Asian, 0.05% Pacific Islander, 21.79% from other races, and 3.16% from two or more races. Hispanic or Latino of any race were 39.96% of the population.

There were 1,890 households, out of which 27.0% had children under the age of 18 living with them, 39.4% were married couples living together, 5.9% had a female householder with no husband present, and 48.6% were non-families. 21.3% of all households were made up of individuals, and 1.1% had someone living alone who was 65 years of age or older. The average household size was 2.81 and the average family size was 3.23.

In the town, the population was spread out, with 20.6% under the age of 18, 17.5% from 18 to 24, 47.1% from 25 to 44, 13.3% from 45 to 64, and 1.4% who were 65 years of age or older. The median age was 29 years. For every 100 females, there were 141.5 males. For every 100 females age 18 and over, there were 144.0 males.

The median income for a household in the town was $56,921, and the median income for a family was $52,339. Males had a median income of $33,053 versus $30,703 for females. The per capita income for the town was $30,115. About 7.1% of families and 13.9% of the population were below the poverty line, including 13.1% of those under age 18 and none of those age 65 or over.

== Neighborhoods ==
Avon includes a number of neighborhoods including Wildridge, Eagle-Vail, Wildwood, Mountain Star.

== Transportation ==
Town of Avon offers free public transportation comprising four bus routes. CORE Transit provides service within Eagle County, with routes linking Avon with Vail, Minturn, Leadville, Edwards, Eagle, Gypsum and Dotsero. Fares range from $3 to $5 per trip.

Avon does not have an active airport. Air passengers use either Eagle County Airport, located 27 miles (43 km) west, or Denver International Airport, located 130 miles (210 km) east. There had previously been a STOLport (Short Take-Off and Landing) facility in Avon, located between Chapel Place and Traer Creek Plaza. Its outline can be seen on aerial and satellite photography (a road overlays parts of the old runway).

=== Major highways ===
- Interstate 70 runs east-west through the middle of Avon. to the east, it connects the town to Vail and Denver. To the west, it connects Avon to Gypsum and Grand Junction, ending at the intersection with Interstate 15, in Utah.
- US 6 begins in Bishop, California, and ends in Provincetown, Massachusetts, serving 12 other states. As in Colorado it runs mostly parallel to Interstates 70 and 76, it can be used as an alternate route from Avon to Edwards, Eagle and Gypsum.

A local four-lane access road spans the Eagle River on a 150-foot (46 m) bridge, constructed in 1992, that was christened "Bob" as the result of a local naming contest. Avon received national attention for the humorous name and made "Bob the Bridge" the theme for several local festivals.

== Economy ==
=== Top employers ===
According to Avon's 2020 Comprehensive Annual Financial Report, the top employers in the city are:

#	Employer	# of Employees
1	The Westin Riverfront Resort & Spa	330
2	Walmart	250
3	City Market	139
4	Maya, Mexican Kitchen	132
5	Eagle River Water & Sanitation District	115
6	Home Depot	112
7	Christie Lodge	105
8	Town of Avon	99
9	Colorado Mountain Medical - Avon	71
10	Sheraton Mountain Vista	47

== Education ==
It is in the Eagle County School District RE 50.

== Sister cities ==
- Lech am Arlberg, Austria

== See also ==
- Beaver Creek Resort
- Edwards, CO Micropolitan Statistical Area
