= Eagle-Vail, Colorado =

Unincorporated community in Colorado, US

- Unincorporated community
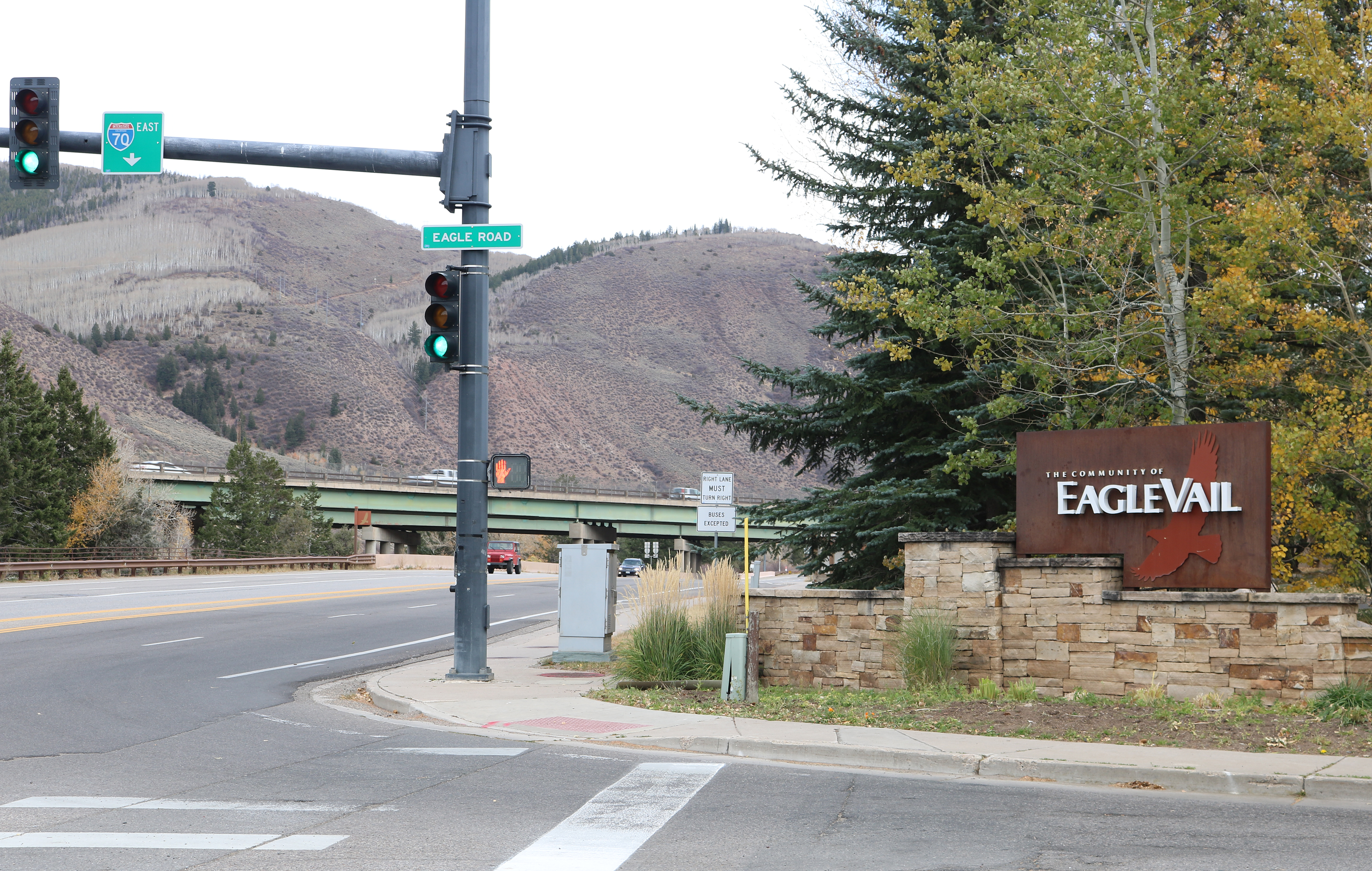
- U.S. Route 6 and Eagle Road in EagleVail.

- Location of Eagle-Vail in Eagle County, Colorado
- Coordinates: 39°37′07″N 106°29′13″W
- Country: United States
- State: Colorado
- County: Eagle

Government
  - Type: Unincorporated community
- Elevation: 7,602 ft (2,317 m)

Population (2000)
  - Total: 2,887
- Time zone: UTC-7 (MST)
  - Summer (DST): UTC-6 (MDT)
- ZIP code: Avon 81620
- GNIS feature ID: 2408700

Eagle-Vail is an unincorporated community in Eagle County, Colorado, United States. Eagle-Vail is located along Interstate 70 and the Eagle River. A former census-designated place (CDP), the population was 2,887 at the 2000 census.

== Location ==
The area is located in the heart of the Eagle River Valley in Eagle County. Located between Vail and Avon, Eagle-Vail is a residential community of 1,400+ homes with a diverse mix of year-round residents and second homeowners. Eagle Vail is managed by the Eagle-Vail Metro District and Eagle-Vail Property Owners Association and is the site of the Eagle-Vail Golf Club.

== Demographics ==
former Eagle-Vail CDP
Year	Pop.	±%
1990	1,922	—
2000	2,887	+50.2%
Source: United States Census Bureau

== Eagle-Vail transportation ==
Eagle-Vail is served by Eagle County Airport, which is near Gypsum.

Interstate 70 runs east-west through the middle of Eagle-Vail. U.S. Route 6 also passes through the community.

Eagle-Vail is served by ECO Transit, a bus public transportation service.
