= No Name, Colorado =

Census-designated place in Garfield County, CO, USA

- Census-designated place
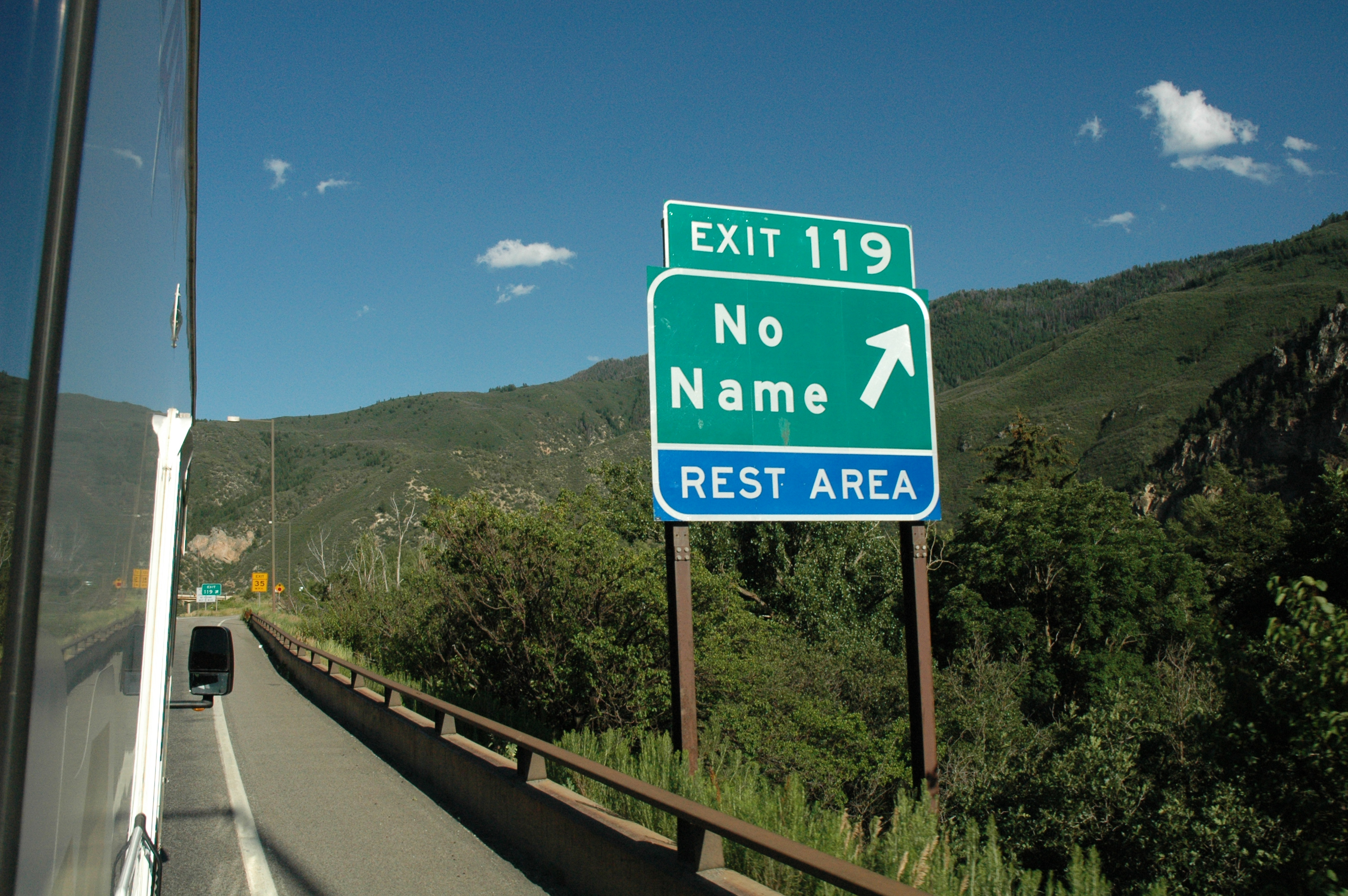
- Sign at Exit 119 of Interstate 70

- Location of the No Name CDP in Garfield County, Colorado
- Coordinates: 39°33′35″N 107°17′34″W
- Country: United States
- State: Colorado
- County: Garfield County

Government
  - Type: unincorporated community

Area
  - Total: 0.179 sq mi (0.463 km^{2})
  - Land: 0.179 sq mi (0.463 km^{2})
  - Water: 0 sq mi (0.000 km^{2})
- Elevation: 5,870 ft (1,790 m)

Population (2020)
  - Total: 117
  - Density: 654/sq mi (253/km^{2})
- Time zone: UTC-7 (MST)
  - Summer (DST): UTC-6 (MDT)
- ZIP Code: Glenwood Springs 81601
- Area code: 970
- GNIS feature ID: 2583271

No Name is a census-designated place (CDP) in and governed by Garfield County, Colorado, United States. The CDP is a part of the Glenwood Springs, CO Micropolitan Statistical Area. The population of the No Name CDP was 117 at the United States Census 2020. The Glenwood Springs post office (Zip Code 81601) serves the area.

== Geography ==
No Name is located east of Glenwood Springs, off exit 119 of Interstate 70/U.S. Route 6 (I-70/US 6) in Glenwood Canyon. It is named for No Name Creek and No Name Canyon. The No Name Tunnel of I-70/US 6 is nearby. It has frequently been noted on lists of unusual place names.

The No Name CDP has an area of 114 acres (0.463 km^{2}), all land.

== Demographics ==
No Name CDP, Colorado
Year	Pop.	±%
2010	123	—
2020	117	−4.9%
Source: United States Census Bureau

The United States Census Bureau initially defined the No Name CDP for the United States Census 2010.

== Education ==
It is in the Roaring Fork School District RE-1.

== See also ==
- List of census-designated places in Colorado
