= Interstate 70 in Colorado =

Section of Interstate Highway in Colorado, United States

Interstate 70
- I-70 highlighted in red

Route information
- Maintained by CDOT
- Length: 449.589 mi (723.543 km)
- History: Designated in 1956; Completed in 1992
- NHS: Entire route
- Restrictions: No hazardous goods allowed in the Eisenhower Tunnel

Major junctions
- West end: I-70 / US 6 / US 50 at the Utah state line near Mack
- US 50 in Grand Junction; US 6 at various locations; US 24 near Vail; US 40 near Empire; I-76 in Arvada; I-25 / US 87 in Denver; I-270 / US 36 in Denver; I-225 in Aurora; US 40 / US 287 in Aurora; E-470 in Aurora
- East end: I-70 / US-24 at the Kansas state line in Kanorado, Kansas

Location
- Country: United States
- State: Colorado
- Counties: Mesa, Garfield, Eagle, Summit, Clear Creek, Jefferson, Denver, Adams, Arapahoe, Elbert, Lincoln, Kit Carson

Highway system
- Interstate Highway System; Main; Auxiliary; Suffixed; Business; Future; Colorado State Highway System; Interstate; US; State; Scenic
← SH 69	→ I-70 BL

Interstate 70 (I-70) is a transcontinental Interstate Highway in the United States, stretching from Cove Fort, Utah, to Baltimore, Maryland. In Colorado, the highway traverses an east–west route across the center of the state. In western Colorado, the highway connects the metropolitan areas of Grand Junction and Denver via a route through the Rocky Mountains. In eastern Colorado, the highway crosses the Great Plains, connecting Denver with metropolitan areas in Kansas and Missouri. Bicycles and other non-motorized vehicles, normally prohibited on Interstate Highways, are allowed on those stretches of I-70 in the Rockies where no other through route exists.

The United States Department of Transportation (USDOT) lists the construction of I-70 among the engineering marvels undertaken in the Interstate Highway System and cites four major accomplishments: the section through the Dakota Hogback, Eisenhower Tunnel, Vail Pass, and Glenwood Canyon. The Eisenhower Tunnel, with a maximum elevation of 11,158 feet (3,401 m) and length of 1.7 miles (2.7 km), is the longest mountain tunnel and highest point along the Interstate Highway System. The portion through Glenwood Canyon was completed on October 14, 1992. This was one of the final pieces of the Interstate Highway System to open to traffic and is one of the most expensive rural highways per mile built in the country. The Colorado Department of Transportation (CDOT) earned the 1993 Outstanding Civil Engineering Achievement Award from the American Society of Civil Engineers for the completion of I-70 through the canyon.

When the Interstate Highway System was in the planning stages, the western terminus of I-70 was proposed to be at Denver. The portion west of Denver was included in the plans after lobbying by Governor Edwin C. Johnson, for whom one of the tunnels along I-70 is named. East of Idaho Springs, I-70 was built along the corridor of U.S. Highway 40 (US 40), one of the original transcontinental U.S. Highways. West of Idaho Springs, I-70 was built along the route of US 6, which was extended into Colorado during the 1930s.

== Route description ==
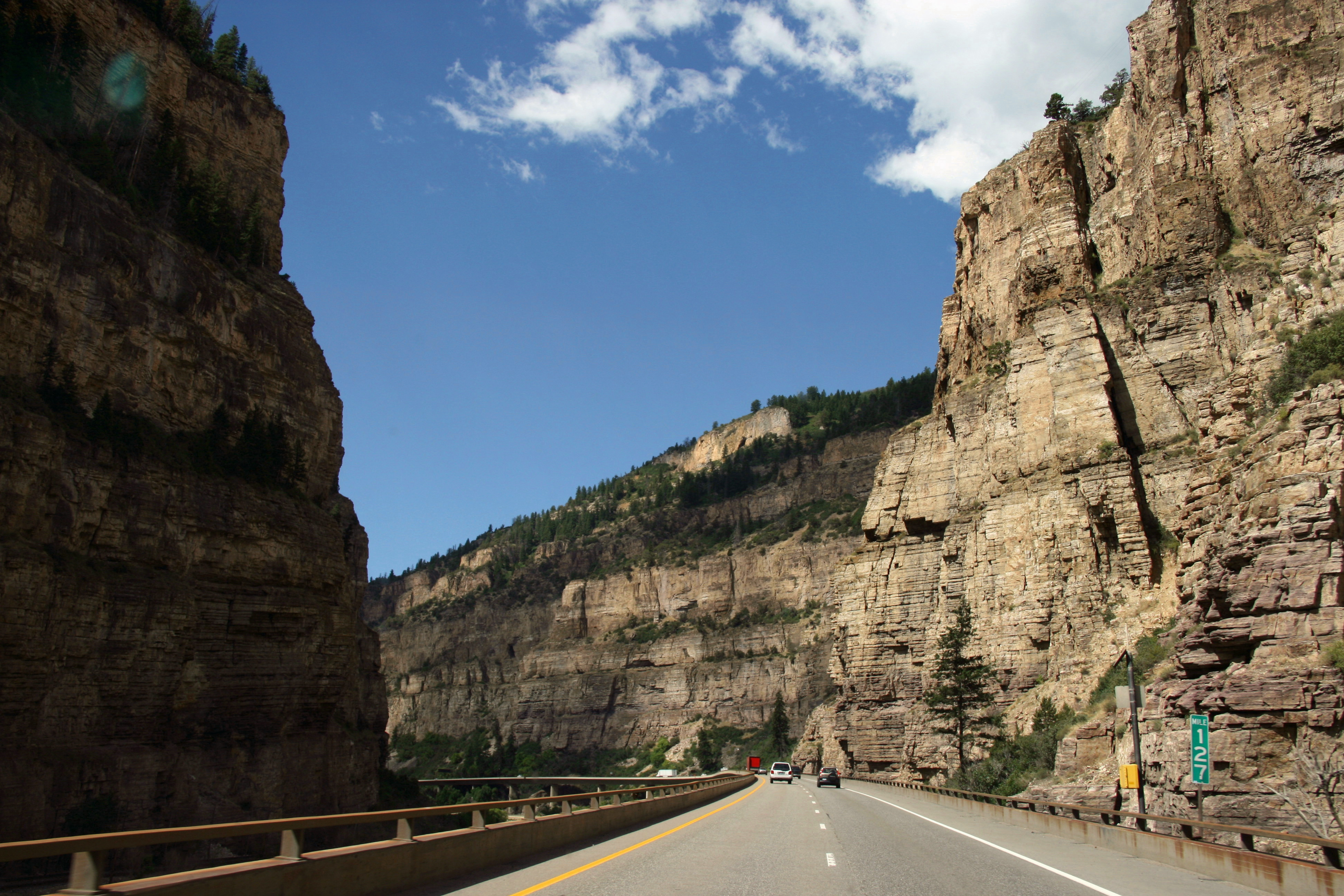
Westbound I-70 on a viaduct inside Glenwood Canyon, paralleling the Colorado River and former Denver and Rio Grande Western Railroad (now Union Pacific) main line

=== Colorado River ===
I-70 enters Colorado from Utah, concurrent with US 6 and US 50, on a plateau between the north rim of Ruby Canyon of the Colorado River and the south rim of the Book Cliffs. The plateau ends just past the state line and the highway descends into the Grand Valley, formed by the Colorado River and its tributaries. The Grand Valley is home to several towns and small cities that form the Grand Junction Metropolitan Statistical Area, the largest conurbation in the area regionally known as the Western Slope. The highway directly serves the communities of Fruita, Grand Junction, and Palisade. Grand Junction is the largest city between Denver and Salt Lake City and serves as the economic hub of the area. The freeway passes to the north of downtown, while US 6 and US 50 retain their original routes through downtown. US 6 rejoins I-70 east of Grand Junction; US 50 departs on a course toward Pueblo.

I-70 exits the valley through De Beque Canyon, a path carved by the Colorado River that separates the Book Cliffs from Battlement Mesa. The river and its tributaries provide the course for the ascent up the Rocky Mountains. In the canyon, I-70 enters the Beavertail Mountain Tunnel, the first of several tunnels built to route the freeway across the Rockies. This tunnel design features a curved side wall, unusual for tunnels in the United States, where most tunnels feature a curved roof and flat side walls. Engineers borrowed a European design to give the tunnel added strength. After the canyon winds past the Book Cliffs, the highway follows the Colorado River through a valley containing the communities of Parachute and Rifle.

=== Glenwood Canyon ===
East of the city of Glenwood Springs, the highway enters Glenwood Canyon. Both the federal and state departments of transportation have praised the engineering achievement required to build the freeway through the narrow gorge while preserving the natural beauty of the canyon. A 12-mile (19 km) section of roadway features the No Name Tunnel, Hanging Lake Tunnel, Reverse Curve Tunnel, 40 bridges and viaducts, and miles of retaining walls. Through a significant portion of the canyon, the eastbound lanes extend cantilevered over the Colorado River and the westbound lanes are suspended on a viaduct several feet above the canyon floor. Along this run, the freeway hugs the north bank of the Colorado River, while the Central Corridor of the Union Pacific Railroad (formerly the Denver and Rio Grande Western Railroad) occupies the south bank.

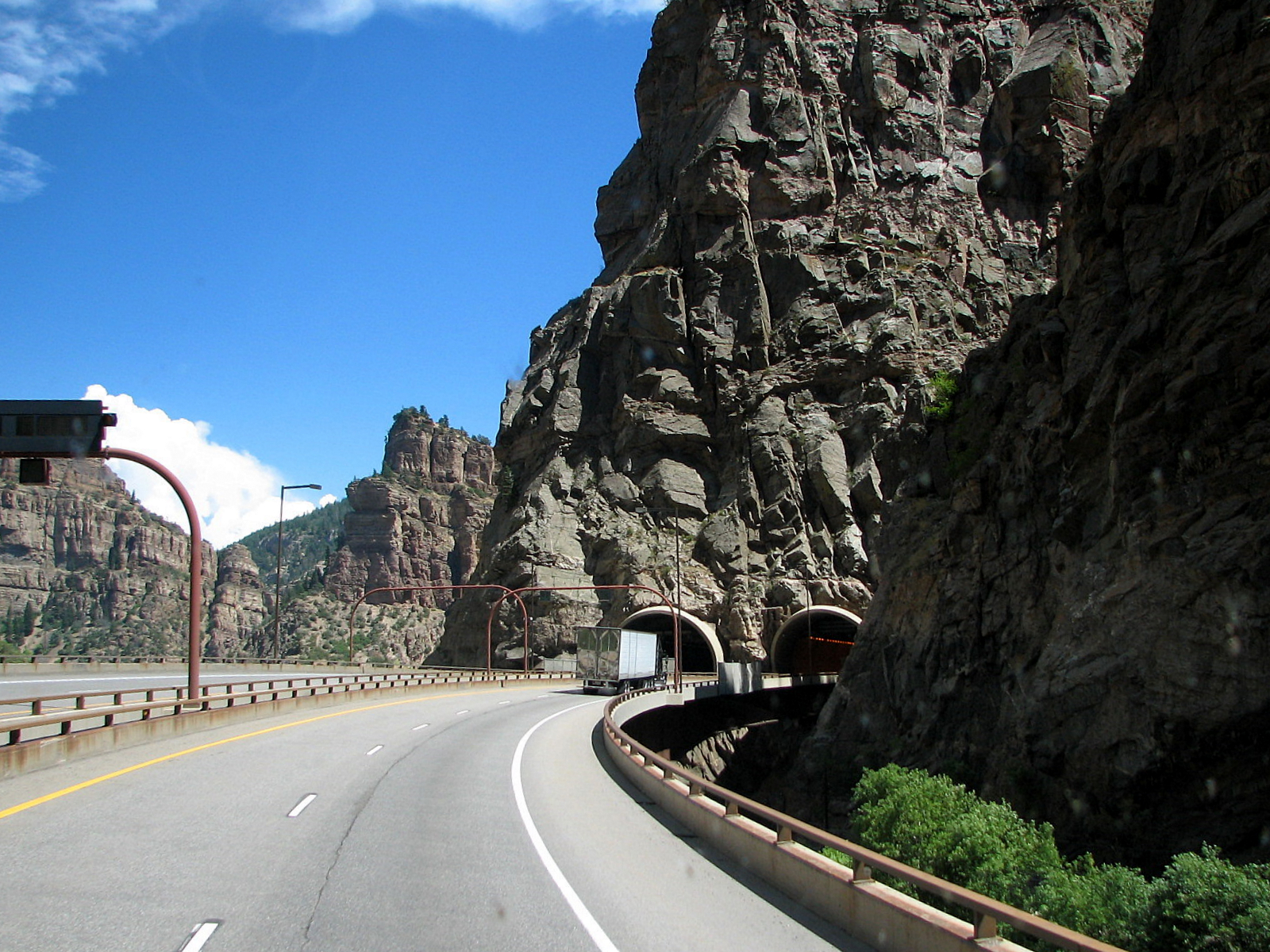
The western portal of the Hanging Lake Tunnel; at this point in the canyon both the river and the railroad are directly below the freeway viaducts.

To minimize the hazards along this portion, a command center staffed with emergency response vehicles and tow trucks on standby monitors cameras along the tunnels and viaducts in the canyon. Traffic signals have been placed at strategic locations to stop traffic in the event of an accident, and variable message signs equipped with radar guns will automatically warn motorists exceeding the design speed of one of the curves.

=== Rocky Mountains ===
The highway departs the Colorado River near Dotsero, the name given to the railroad separation for the two primary mountain crossings, the original via Tennessee Pass/Royal Gorge and the newer and shorter Moffat Tunnel route. I-70 uses a separate route between the two rail corridors. From this junction, I-70 follows the Eagle River toward Vail Pass, at an elevation of 10,666 feet (3,251 m). In this canyon, I-70 reaches the western terminus of US 24, which meanders through the Rockies before rejoining I-70. US 24 is known as the Highway of the Fourteeners, from the concentration of mountains exceeding 14,000 feet (4,300 m) along the highway corridor. Along the ascent, I-70 serves the ski resort town of Vail and the ski areas of Beaver Creek Resort, Vail Ski Resort, and Copper Mountain.

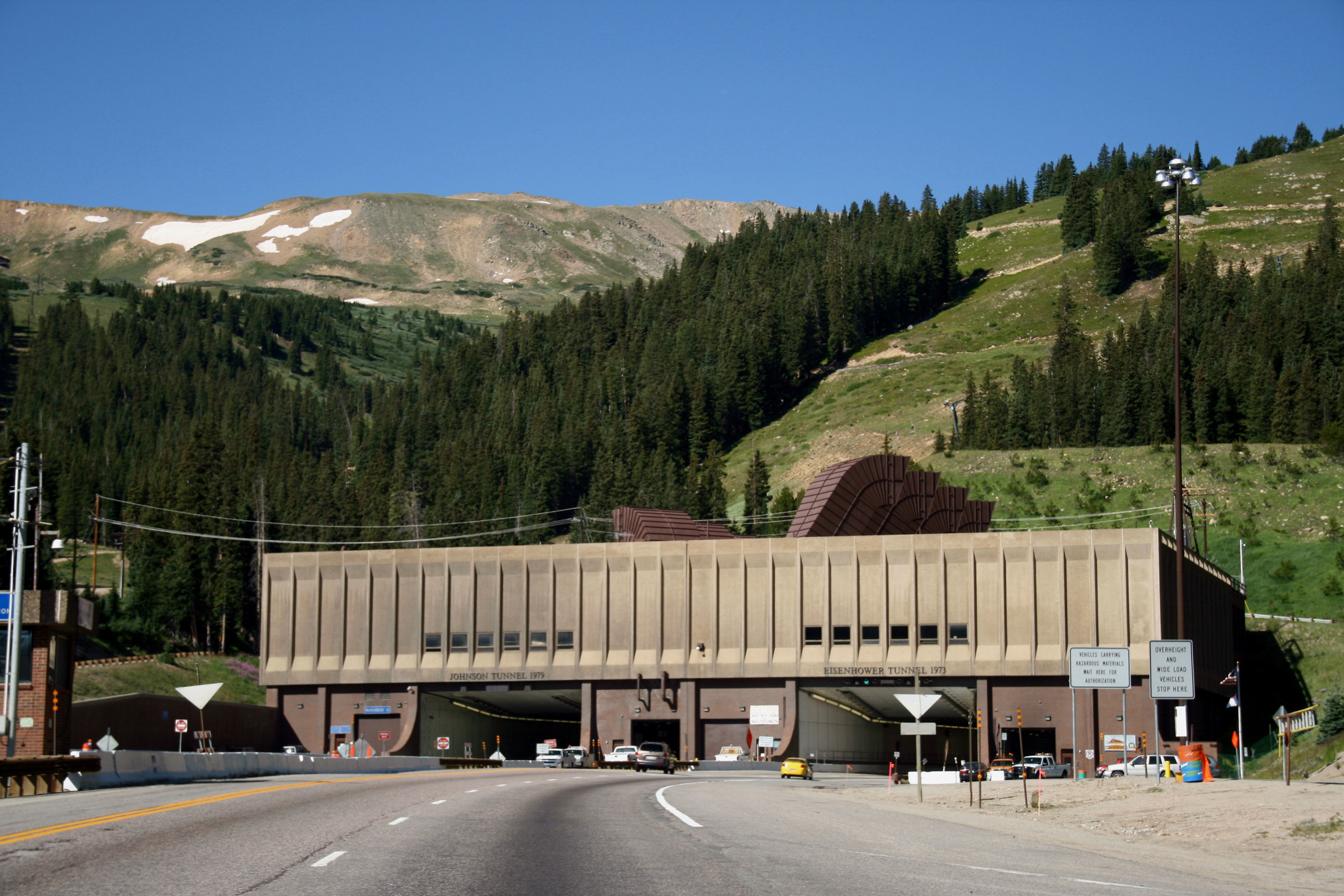
Entrance to the Eisenhower Tunnel

The construction of the freeway over Vail Pass is also listed as an engineering marvel. One of the challenges of this portion is the management of the wildlife that roams this area. Several parts of the approach to the pass feature large fences that prevent wildlife from crossing the freeway and direct the animals to one of several underpasses. At least one underpass is located along a natural migratory path and has been landscaped to encourage deer to cross.

The highway descends to Dillon Reservoir, near the town of Frisco, and begins one final ascent to the Eisenhower Tunnel, where the freeway crosses the Continental Divide. At the time of dedication, this tunnel was the highest vehicular tunnel in the world, at 11,158 feet (3,401 m). As of 2010, the facility was still the highest vehicular tunnel in the US. The Eisenhower Tunnel is noted as both the longest mountain tunnel and the highest point on the Interstate Highway System. The tunnel has a command center, staffed with 52 full-time employees, to monitor traffic, remove stranded vehicles, and maintain generators to keep the tunnel's lighting and ventilation systems running in the event of a power failure. Signals are placed at each entrance and at various points inside the tunnel to close lanes or stop traffic in an emergency. There are several active and former ski resorts in the vicinity of the tunnel, including Breckenridge Ski Resort, Keystone Resort, Arapahoe Basin, Loveland Ski Area, Berthoud Pass Ski Area, and Winter Park Resort.

=== Clear Creek ===
The freeway follows Clear Creek down the eastern side of the Rockies, passing through the Veterans Memorial Tunnels near Idaho Springs. Farther to the east, I-70 departs the US 6 corridor, which continues to follow Clear Creek through a narrow, curving gorge. The Interstate, however, follows the corridor of US 40 out of the canyon. The highway crests a small mountain near Genesee Park to descend into Mount Vernon Canyon to exit the Rocky Mountains. This portion features grade-warning signs with unusual messages, such as "Trucks: Don't be fooled", "Truckers, you are not down yet", and "Are your brakes adjusted and cool?". Runaway truck ramps are a prominent feature along this portion of I-70, with a total of seven used along the descent of either side the Continental Divide to stop trucks with failed brakes.

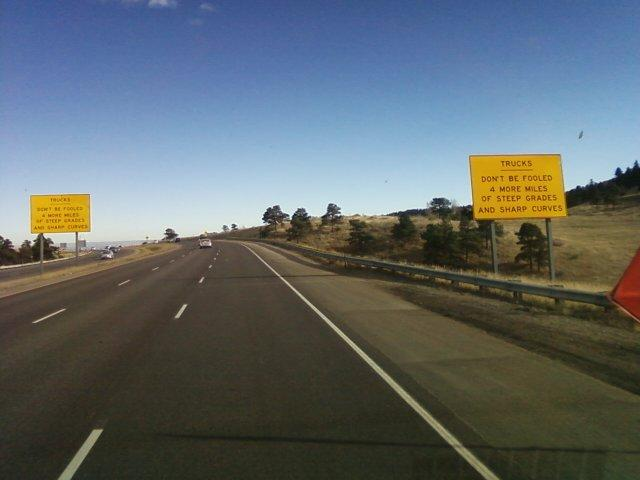
Warning sign stating, "Trucks, Don't be Fooled—4 more miles [6.4 km] of steep grades and sharp curves"

The last geographic feature of the Rocky Mountains traversed before the highway reaches the Great Plains is the Dakota Hogback. The path through the hogback features a massive cut that exposes various layers of rock millions of years old. The site includes a nature study area for visitors.

=== Great Plains ===
As the freeway passes from the Rocky Mountains to the Great Plains, I-70 enters the Denver metropolitan area, part of a larger urban area called the Front Range Urban Corridor. The freeway arcs around the northern edge of the LoDo district, the common name of the lower downtown area of Denver. Through the downtown area, US 40 is routed along Colfax Avenue, which served as the primary east–west artery through the Denver area before the construction of I-70. Through downtown, US 6 is routed along 6th Avenue before departing the I-70 corridor to join I-76 on a northeast course toward Nebraska. The freeway meets I-25 in an interchange frequently called the Mousetrap. From I-25 on to I-225, I-70 serves—together with those two Interstates—as part of an inner beltway around Denver.

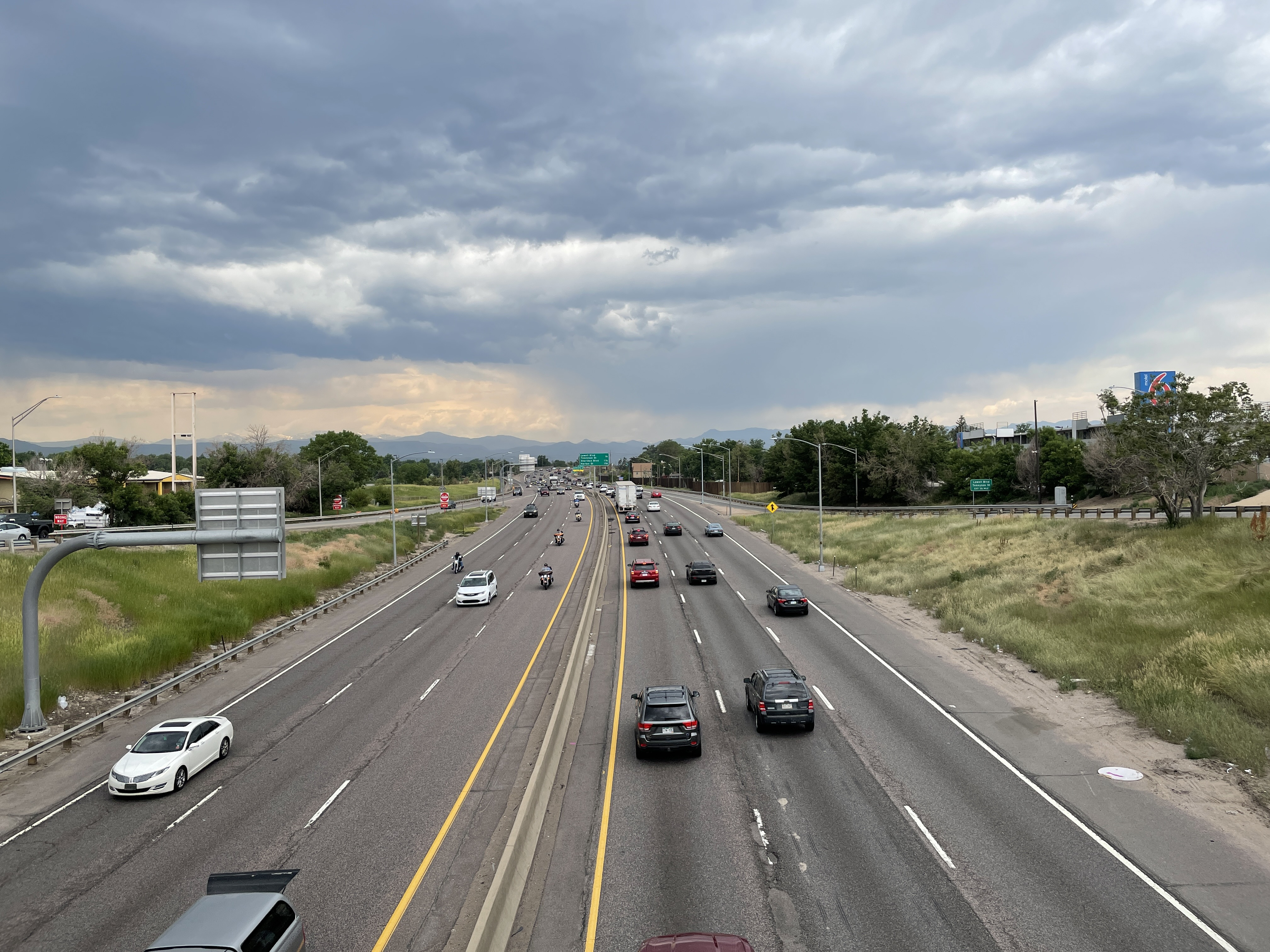
I-70 westbound at the US 287 interchange in Denver

I-70 has one official branch in Colorado, I-270, which connects the Interstate with the Denver–Boulder Turnpike. Where these two freeways merge is the busiest portion of I-70 in the state, with an average of 183,000 vehicles per day as of 2009. While State Highway 470 (SH 470) and E-470 are not officially branches of I-70, they are remnants of plans for an I-470 outer beltway around Denver that were canceled when the allocated funds were spent elsewhere.

Leaving Denver, the highway serves the redevelopment areas on the former site of Stapleton International Airport; runway 17R/35L crossed over the Interstate at the runway's midsection. East of Aurora, I-70 rejoins the alignment of US 40 at Colfax Avenue. The freeway proceeds east across the Great Plains, briefly dipping south to serve the city of Limon, which bills itself as Hub City because of the many rail and road arteries that intersect there. I-70 enters Kansas near Burlington, a small community known for having one of the oldest carousels in the United States.

== History ==
In 1944, a report to the United States Congress outlined several interregional highways, among which was a freeway from the east along the US 40 corridor that ended in Denver. After Colorado officials lobbied successfully, the designation was extended west over the Rocky Mountains following US 6. The origins of both the US 40 and US 6 predate the United States Numbered Highway System, using established transcontinental trails.

=== Earlier routes ===
Before the formation of the US Highway System, the country relied on an informal network of roads, organized by various competing interests, collectively called the auto trail system. The surveyors of most trails chose either South Pass in Wyoming or a southern route through New Mexico to traverse the Rocky Mountains. Both options were less formidable than the higher mountain passes in Colorado but left the state without a transcontinental artery. When the planners of the Lincoln Highway also decided to cross the Rockies in Wyoming, officials pressed for a loop to branch from the main route in Nebraska, enter Colorado, and return to the main route in Wyoming. When the Lincoln Highway opened in 1913, it was routed this way, but the loop proved impractical and was removed in 1915.

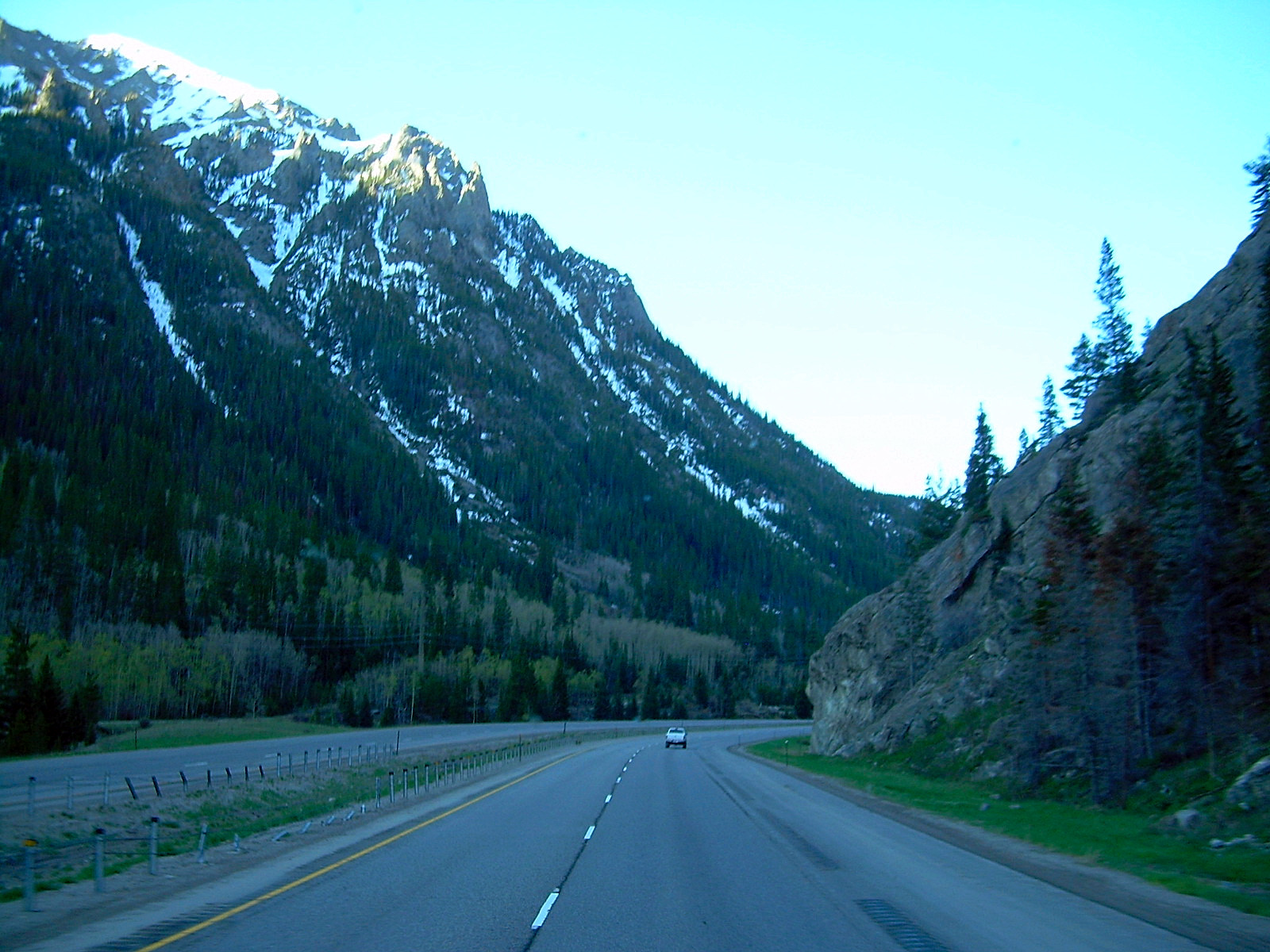
I-70 crossing the Rocky Mountains

After losing the connection to the Lincoln Highway, in 1922 officials convinced planners of the Victory Highway to traverse the state. The highway entered Colorado from Kansas along what was previously called the Smoky Hill Trail. The highway crossed the mountains along a trail blazed by a railroad surveyor and captain in the American Civil War, cresting at Berthoud Pass. After a round of political infighting between Utah and Nevada, the Victory Highway would become the Lincoln Highway's main rival for San Francisco-bound traffic. When the U.S. Highway system was unveiled in 1926, the Victory Highway was numbered US 40.

While US 6 was also one of the original 1926 US Highways, the road originally served the portion of the country east of the Rocky Mountains. The highway was not extended to the Pacific coast until 1937, mostly following the Midland Trail. Around the time the U.S. Highway system was formed, the portion of the Midland Trail through Glenwood Canyon, known as the Taylor State Road, was destroyed by a flood. When US 6 was extended, the Works Progress Administration was rebuilding the road through the canyon and the Public Works Administration was nearing completion of a new highway over Vail Pass. In western Colorado, US 6 was routed concurrent with US 50 from the Utah state line to Grand Junction and eventually replaced US 24 from Grand Junction to near Vail. To keep these routes over the Rockies competitive with alternatives in other states, the Colorado Department of Highways relied on ingenuity to keep the roads safe. The department pioneered new machines to clear snow and various bridge and culvert designs to protect the roads from flooding.

=== Interstate Highway planning ===
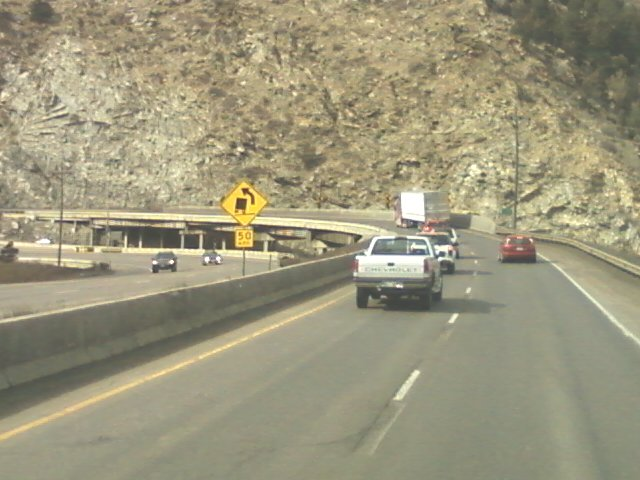
I-70 descending into Clear Creek Canyon

Governor Edwin C. Johnson, for whom one of the tunnels along I-70 was later named, was a primary force in persuading the planners of the Interstate Highway System to extend the highway across the state. He stated to the Senate subcommittee in 1955:

You are going to have a four-lane highway through Wyoming. You are going to build two four-lane highways through New Mexico and Arizona. Colorado needs to be able to compete with our neighboring states. We do not want to take anything away from them. We do not want them to get way out ahead of us, either, because these interstate highways are going to be very attractive highways for the East and West to travel on.

Colorado held several meetings to convince reluctant Utah officials they would benefit from a freeway link between Denver and Salt Lake City. Utah officials expressed concerns that, given the terrain between these cities, this link would be difficult to build. They later expressed concerns that the construction would drain resources from completing Interstate Highways they deemed to have a higher priority. Colorado officials persisted, presenting three alternatives to route I-70 west of Denver, using the corridors of US 40, US 6, and a route starting at Pueblo, proceeding west along US 50/US 285/US 24. In March 1955, Colorado officials succeeded in convincing Utah officials with the state legislature passing a resolution supporting a link with Denver. The two states jointly issued a proposal to Congress that would extend the plans for I-70 along the US 6 corridor. Under this proposal, the freeway would terminate at I-15 near Spanish Fork, Utah, linking the Front Range and Wasatch Front metropolitan areas.

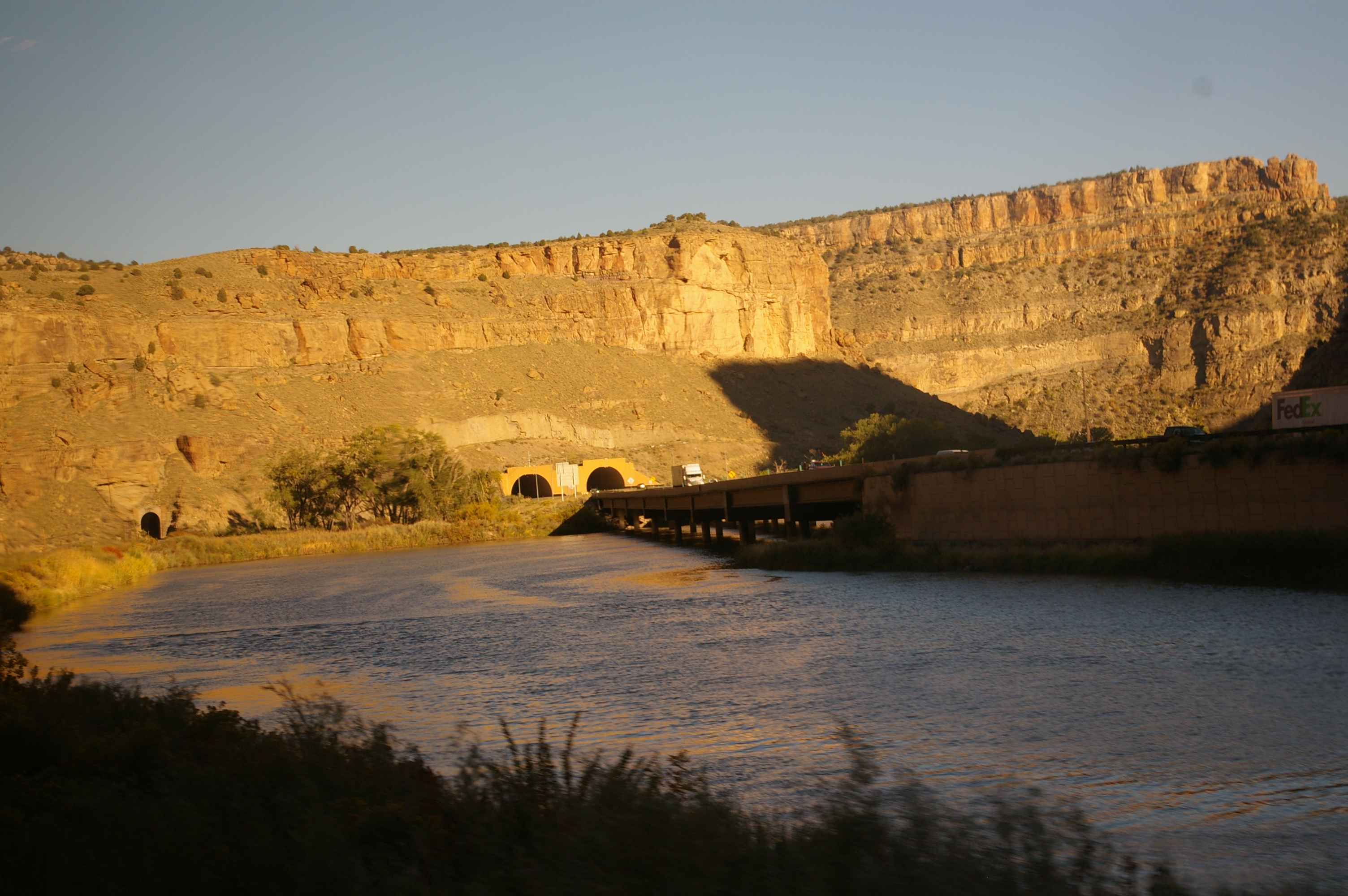
Beavertail Mountain tunnel as seen from Amtrak's California Zephyr

Congress approved the extension of I-70; however, the route still had to be approved by the representatives of the military on the planning committee. Military representatives were concerned that plans for this new highway network did not have a direct connection from the central part of the country to Southern California; and further felt Salt Lake City was adequately connected. Military planners approved the extension but moved the western terminus south to Cove Fort, using I-70 as part of a link between Denver with Los Angeles instead of Salt Lake City. Utah officials objected to the modification, complaining they were being asked to build a long and expensive freeway that would serve no populated areas of the state. After being told this was the only way the military would approve the extension, Utah officials agreed to build the freeway along the approved route.

=== Construction ===
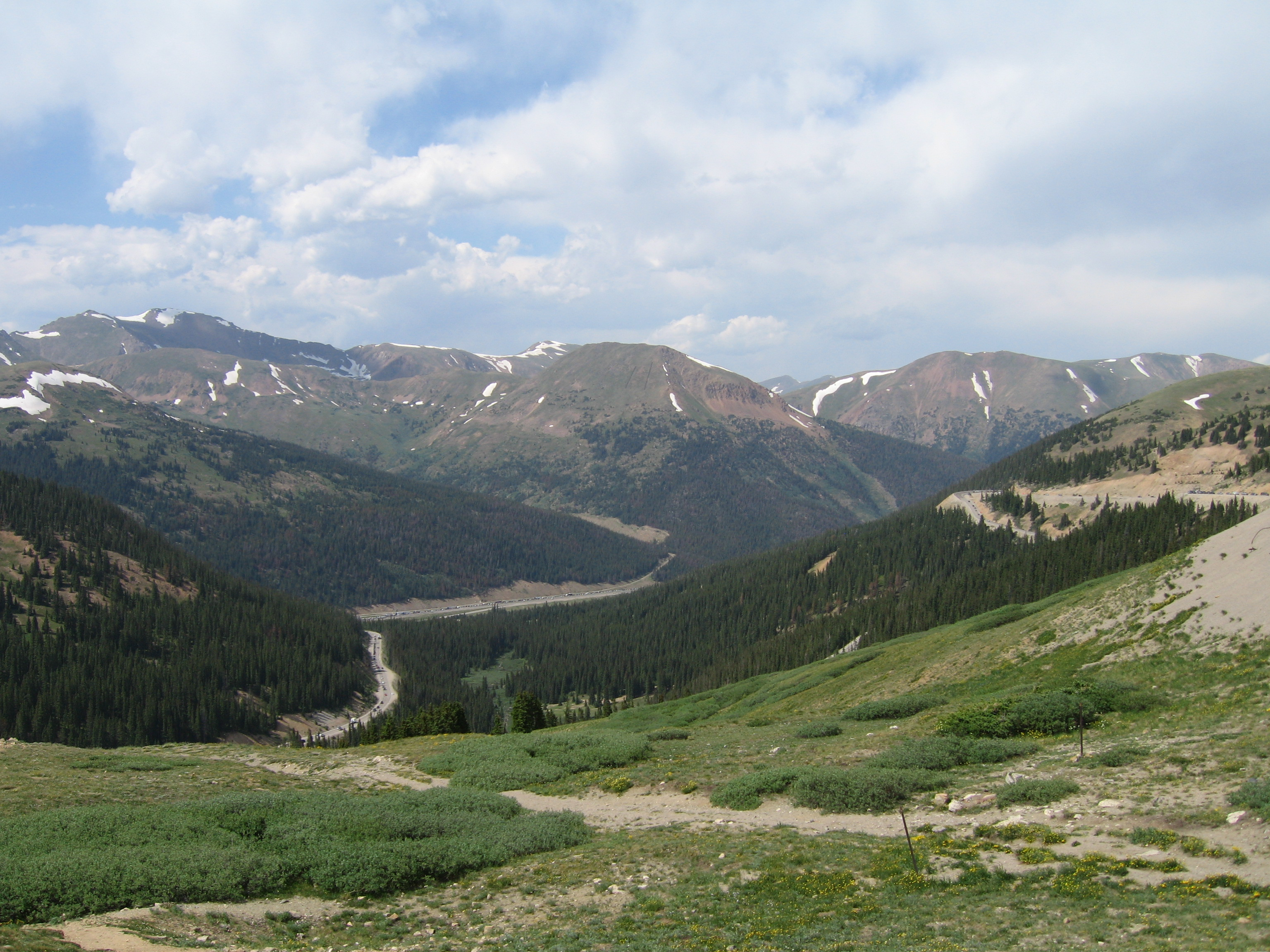
View from Loveland Pass, showing a hairpin turn along the US 6 alignment on top right, and the straighter I-70 emerging from the Eisenhower Tunnel on the left

The first Colorado portion of I-70 opened to traffic in 1961. This section bypassed and linked Idaho Springs to the junction where US 6 currently separates from I-70 west of the city. The majority of the alignment through Denver was completed by 1964. The Mousetrap reused some structures that were built in 1951, before the formation of the Interstate Highway System. The last piece east of Denver opened to traffic in 1977.

==== Eisenhower Tunnel ====
Planning on how to route the freeway over the Rocky Mountains began in the early 1960s. The US 6 corridor crosses two passes: Loveland Pass, at an elevation of 11,992 feet (3,655 m), and Vail Pass, at 10,666 feet (3,251 m). Engineers recommended tunneling under Loveland Pass to bypass the steep grades and hairpin curves required to navigate US 6. The project was originally called the Straight Creek Tunnel, after the waterway that runs along the western approach. The tunnel was later renamed the Eisenhower–Johnson Memorial Tunnel, after President Dwight D. Eisenhower and Colorado Governor Edwin C. Johnson.

Construction on the first bore of the tunnel was started on March 15, 1968. Construction efforts suffered many setbacks, and the project went well over time and budget. One of the biggest setbacks was the discovery of fault lines in the path of the tunnel that were not discovered during the pilot bores. These faults began to slip during construction and emergency measures had to be taken to protect the tunnels and workers from cave-ins and collapses. A total of nine workers were killed during the construction of both bores. Further complicating construction was that the boring machines could not work as fast as expected at such high altitudes, and the productivity was significantly less than planned. The frustration prompted one engineer to comment, "We were going by the book, but the damned mountain couldn't read." The first bore was dedicated March 8, 1973. Initially, this tunnel was used for two-way traffic, with one lane for each direction. The amount of traffic through the tunnel exceeded predictions, and efforts soon began to expedite construction on the second tube (the Johnson bore), which was finished on December 21, 1979. The initial engineering cost estimate for the Eisenhower bore was $42 million; the actual cost was $108 million (equivalent to $597 million in 2025). Approximately 90 percent of the funds were paid by the federal government, with the state of Colorado paying the rest. At the time, this figure set a record for the most expensive federally aided project. The excavation cost for the Johnson bore was $102.8 million (equivalent to $456 million in 2025).

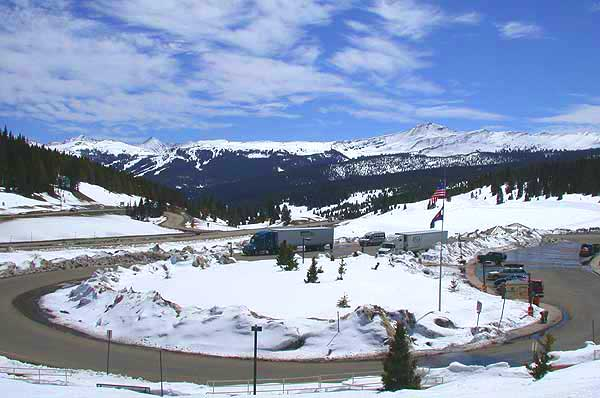
Rest area along I-70 at the top of Vail Pass

The tunnel construction became involved in the women's rights movement due to advocacy by Janet Bonnema after she was subjected to gender-based discrimination after being hired as an engineering technician for the construction of the Straight Creek Tunnel in 1970. Bonnema was restricted from entering the tunnel due to the miners' superstition that women who entered underground mines and tunnels would bring bad luck. In 1972, Bonnema filed a $100,000 class action suit against CDOT, citing Title VII of the Civil Rights Act of 1964. As Colorado voters had passed the Equal Rights Amendment that year, the state settled Bonnema's case out of court for $6,730. Bonnema entered the tunnel for the first time on November 9, 1972, prompting 66 workers to temporarily walk off the job; most returned the next day. She continued with the project until the tunnel opened.

==== Vail Pass ====
While designing the Eisenhower Tunnel, controversies erupted over how to build the portions over Vail Pass and Glenwood Canyon. The route of US 6 over Vail Pass has a distinctive "V" shape. Initially, engineers thought they could shorten the route of I-70 by about 10 miles (16 km) by tunneling from Gore Creek to South Willow Creek, an alternative known as the Red Buffalo Tunnel. This alternative sparked a nationwide controversy as it would require an easement across federally protected lands, through what is now called the Eagles Nest Wilderness. After the US Secretary of Agriculture refused to grant the easement, the engineers agreed to follow the existing route across Vail Pass. The engineers added infrastructure to accommodate wildlife and had significant portions of the viaducts constructed offsite and lifted in place to minimize the environmental footprint. The grade over Vail Pass reaches seven percent.

==== Glenwood Canyon ====
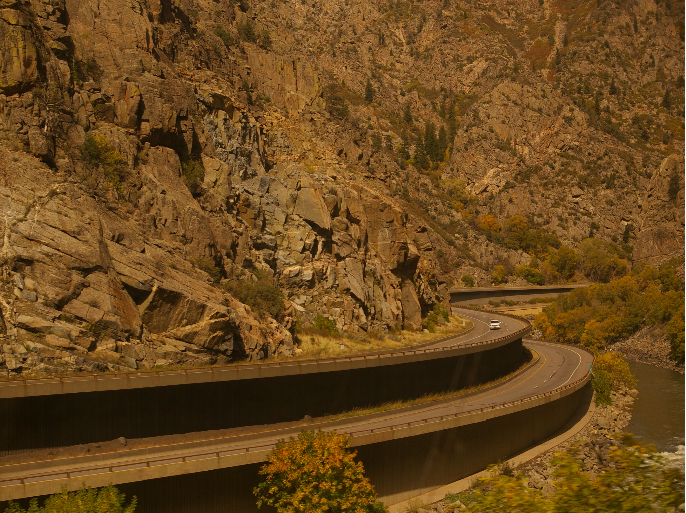
I-70 in Glenwood Canyon as seen from Amtrak's California Zephyr

Glenwood Canyon has served as the primary transportation artery through the Rocky Mountains, even before the creation of U.S. Highways. Railroads have used the canyon since 1887, and a dirt road was built through the canyon in the early 20th century. The first paved road was built from 1936 to 1938 at a cost of $1.5 million (equivalent to $26.9 million in 2025).

With the Eisenhower Tunnel finished, the last remaining obstacle for I-70 to be an interstate commercial artery was the two lane, non-freeway portion in Glenwood Canyon. Construction had started on this section in the 1960s with a small section opening to traffic in 1966. The remainder was stopped due to environmentalist protests that caused a 30-year controversy. The original design was criticized as "the epitome of environmental insensitivity". Engineers scrapped the original plans and started work on a new design that would minimize additional environmental impacts. A new design was underway by 1971, which was approved in 1975; however, environmental groups filed lawsuits to stop construction, and the controversy continued even when construction finally resumed in 1981. The final design included 40 bridges and viaducts, three additional tunnel bores (two were completed before construction was stopped in the 1960s), and 15 miles (24 km) of retaining walls for a stretch of freeway 12 miles (19 km) long. The project was further complicated by the need to build the four-lane freeway without disturbing the operations of the railroad. This required using special and coordinated blasting techniques. Engineers designed two separate tracks for the highway, one elevated above the other, to minimize the footprint in the canyon. The final design was praised for its environmental sensitivity. A Denver architect who helped design the freeway proclaimed, "Most of the people in western Colorado see it as having preserved the canyon." He further stated, "I think pieces of the highway elevate to the standard of public art." A portion of the project included shoring up the banks of the Colorado River to repair damage and remove flow restrictions created in the initial construction of US 6 in the 1930s.

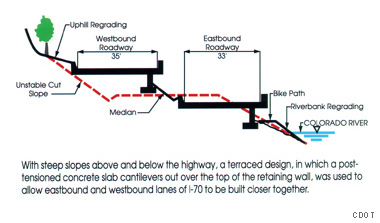
CDOT drawing showing how reusing the existing footprint of US 6 combined with elevating two lanes helped minimize the environmental impact of the freeway on Glenwood Canyon

The freeway was finally completed on October 14, 1992, in a ceremony covered nationwide. Most coverage celebrated the engineering achievement or noted this was the last major piece of the Interstate Highway System to open to traffic. However, newspapers in western Colorado celebrated the end of the frustrating traffic delays. For most of the final 10 years of construction, only a single lane of traffic that reversed direction every 30 minutes remained open in the canyon. One newspaper proudly proclaimed "You heard right. For the first time in more than 10 years, construction delays along that 12-mile [19 km] stretch of Interstate 70 will be non-existent."

The cost was $490 million (equivalent to $1.01 billion in 2025) to build 12 miles (19 km), 40 times the average cost per mile predicted by the planners of the Interstate Highway System. This figure exceeded that of I-15 through the Virgin River Gorge, which was previously proclaimed the most expensive rural freeway in the country. The construction of I-70 through Glenwood Canyon earned 30 awards for CDOT, including the 1993 Outstanding Civil Engineering Achievement Award from the American Society of Civil Engineers. At the dedication, it was claimed that I-70 through Glenwood Canyon was the final piece of the Interstate Highway System to open to traffic. For this reason, the system was proclaimed to be complete. However, at the time, there were still two sections of the original Interstate Highway System that had not been constructed: a section of I-95 in central New Jersey, that was not completed until 2018, and a section of I-70 in Breezewood, Pennsylvania.

==== Realignments ====
In 2022, CDOT replaced a 1.8-mile (2.9 km) viaduct that formerly carried I-70 between Brighton Boulevard and Colorado Boulevard in Denver with a below-grade highway. The $1.2 billion project, financed through a public–private partnership with Kiewit and Meridiam, added new express toll lanes; the below-grade freeway was covered with a four-acre (1.6 ha) park between Clayton and Columbine streets. Traffic was moved onto the new alignment in late 2022; however, the project was not fully complete until July 2023.

In 2023 CDOT initiated a safety improvement project to re-align the descent from Floyd Hill into Clear Creek Canyon, which will include moving lanes to a viaduct over other lanes, to allow more room for banking and regrading curves in the narrow gorge. The project is expected to be complete in 2029.

=== Incidents ===
On August 1, 1984, a truck carrying six torpedoes for the US Navy overturned while navigating a ramp at the Mousetrap, a complex interchange. The situation was made worse as no one answered at the phone number provided with the cargo, and an unknown liquid was leaking from one of the torpedoes. It took more than three hours before any military personnel arrived on the scene, US Army personnel from a nearby base. The incident left thousands of cars stranded and Denver's transportation network paralyzed for about eight hours. Approximately 50 residents in the area were evacuated. Investigations later revealed that the truck driver was previously intercepted by the Colorado State Patrol, who specifically warned the driver to avoid the Mousetrap and provided the driver with an alternate route. The Navy promised reforms after being criticized for providing an unstaffed phone number with a hazardous cargo shipment, a violation of federal law, and failing to notify Denver officials about the shipment. The Mousetrap was grandfathered into the Interstate Highway System, with some structures built in 1951. The incident provided momentum to rebuild the interchange with a more modern and safer design. Construction began in several phases in 1987, and the last bridge was dedicated in 2003.

In 2014, mile-marker 420 was altered by CDOT to read "Mile 419.99" following repeat thefts of the original sign due to the significance of the number 420 in cannabis culture.

In 2019, a fiery crash killed four people and injured dozens. A previous, non-fatal accident in Wheat Ridge had resulted in backed up traffic for several miles. At the time of the second collision, the backup extended into Lakewood past the Colorado Mills Parkway exit. A semi-trailer truck descending the grades as the freeway entered the greater Denver area, driven by Rogel Aguilera Mederos, attempted to downshift, but he was unable re-engage the transmission. This resulted in the vehicle rapidly increasing in speed, with witnesses seeing the truck out of control near the Genesee exit, nine miles (14 km) from where the accident would occur. Witnesses also testified seeing the brakes smoking while the truck descended the hill. The driver passed at least one runaway truck ramp without entering, as well as four other exits where he could have exited the freeway. As the truck approached the backed up traffic, the driver attempted to swerve to the side of the road to avoid a collision but was unable as other trucks had already blocked this path while similarly attempting to avoid a collision. The truck collided with the backup and exploded. Over a dozen other vehicles were involved in the collision and four people died. The driver was charged with numerous offenses, including assault and vehicular homicide and initially sentenced to 110 years. This was controversial, due to the length of the sentence and the opinions of some victims and witnesses that the owner of the truck bore more responsibility. The company had previously been fined and cited for numerous brake-related violations as well as employing inexperienced truck drivers who were not fluent in English. Aguilera testified through an interpreter in his own defense and pleaded for mercy saying, "I ask God too many times why them and not me? Why did I survive that accident?". He also blamed his employer, testifying he was instructed to take back roads from the trip's origin in Wyoming and avoid the more commonly used road from Wyoming, I-25. Shortly after the accident, CDOT announced a location for an additional runaway truck ramp in this area.

After the 2020 Grizzly Creek Fire, I-70 was closed in Glenwood Canyon in August 2021 due to significant damage by debris from the fire, causing large detours. The damage after the 2021 landslides required lengthy reconstruction of the road; the highway partially reopened on August 14, 2021.

=== Legacy ===
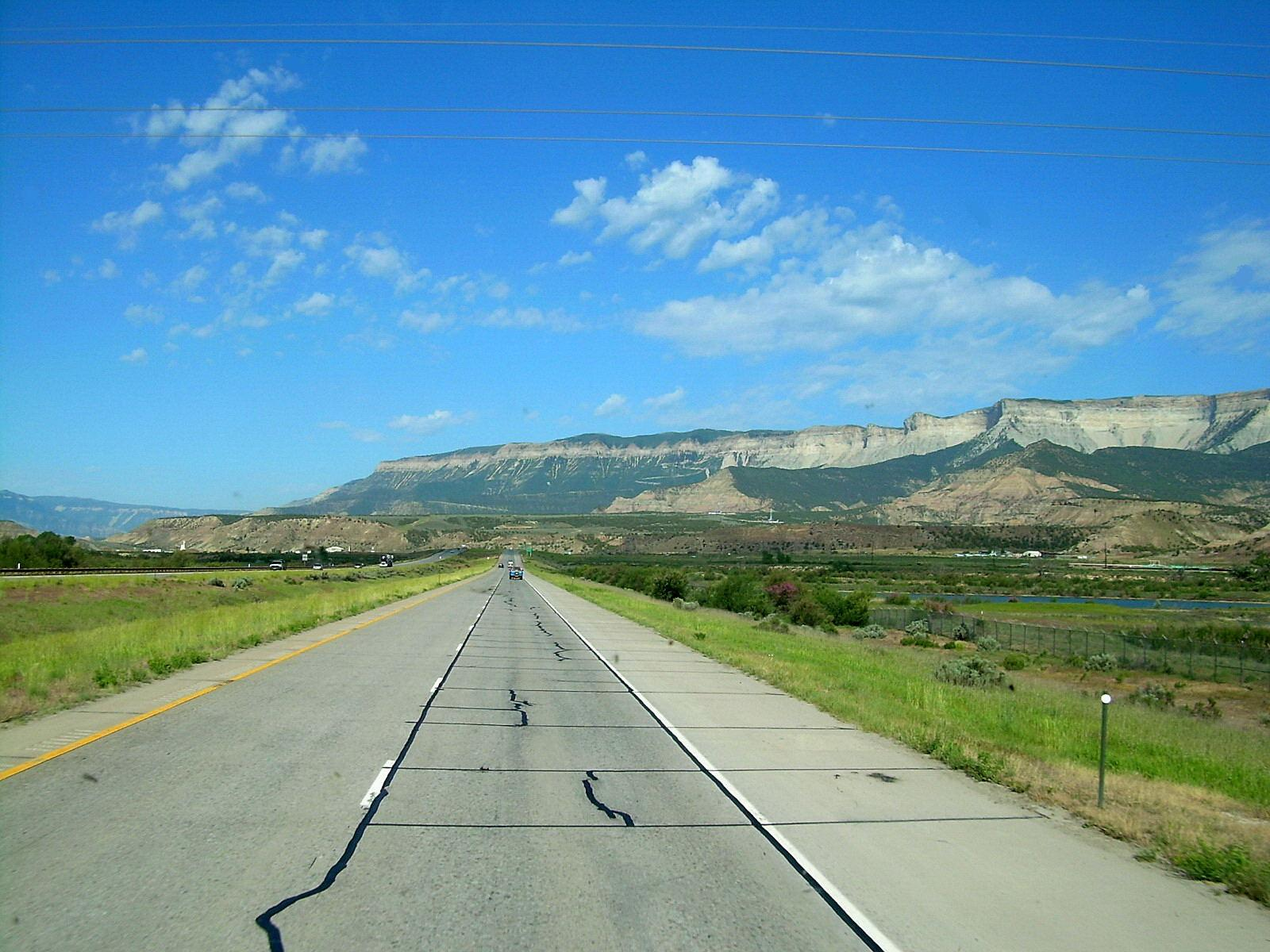
I-70 through the Colorado Plateau

When first approved, the extension of I-70 from Denver to Cove Fort was criticized in some area newspapers as a road to nowhere; an information liaison specialist with USDOT in Baltimore, Maryland—the eastern terminus of I-70—claims people have asked "did we think Baltimoreans were so desperate to get to Cove Fort that we were willing to pay $4 billion to get them there?" However, a resident engineer with USDOT has called the extension one of the "crown jewels" of the Interstate Highway System. In Colorado, the freeway helped unite the state, despite the two halves being separated by the formidable Rocky Mountains. The Eisenhower Tunnel alone is credited with saving up to an hour from the drive across the state. Prior to I-70's construction, the highway through Glenwood Canyon was one of the most dangerous in the state. With the improvements, the accident rate has dropped 40 percent even though traffic through the canyon has substantially increased. CDOT is considering the nomination of various portions of I-70 as a National Historic Landmark, even though the freeway will not qualify as historical for several decades.

The freeway is credited with enhancing Colorado's ski industry. The ski resort town of Vail did not exist until I-70 began construction, with developers working in close partnership with CDOT. By 1984, the I-70 corridor between Denver and Grand Junction contained the largest concentration of ski resorts in the country. The towns and cities along the corridor have experienced significant growth, luring recreational visitors from the Denver area. As one conservationist lamented, I-70 "changed rural Colorado into non-rural Colorado".

== Exit list ==
County	Location	mi	km	Exit	Destinations	Notes
Mesa		0.000	0.000		I-70 west (US 6 / US 50 west) – Green River	Continuation into Utah
Mesa		1.814	2.919	2	Rabbit Valley	
Mesa	Mack	11.106	17.873	11	Mack ( US 6 / US 50 east)	Eastern end of concurrency with US 6/US 50
Mesa		15.081	24.271	15	SH 139 north – Loma, Rangely	Southern terminus of SH 139
Mesa	Fruita	19.444	31.292	19	SH 340 to US 6 (US 50) – Fruita	
Mesa	Grand Junction	25.563	41.140	26	I-70 BL east / US 6 / US 50 – Grand Junction	Diverging diamond interchange; Grand Junction appears only on eastbound signage
Mesa	Grand Junction	27.570	44.370	28	24 Road Redlands Parkway	
Mesa	Grand Junction	31.351	50.455	31	Horizon Drive	
Mesa		36.644	58.973	37	I-70 BL west to US 6 – Clifton, Delta, Grand Junction	Delta appears only on eastbound signage; US 6 and Grand Junction appear only on westbound signage
Mesa	Palisade	41.578	66.913	42	To US 6 – Palisade	US 6 appears only on eastbound signage
Mesa		43.682	70.299	44	US 6 west – Palisade	Westbound exit and eastbound entrance; western end of concurrency with US 6
Mesa		45.332	72.955	45	Cameo	
Mesa		46.867	75.425	47	James M. Robb – Colorado River State Park, Island Acres	Former port of entry
Mesa		49.015	78.882	49	SH 65 south to SH 330 east – Grand Mesa, Collbran	
Mesa		50.381	81.080	Beavertail Tunnel		
Mesa		61.648	99.213	62	De Beque (US 6 east)	Eastern end of concurrency with US 6
Garfield	Parachute	72.230	116.243	72	US 6 to CR 215 north – West Parachute	Dumbbell interchange; opened October 31, 2012
Garfield	Parachute	74.661	120.155	75	Parachute, Battlement Mesa	
Garfield		81.236	130.737	81	Rulison	
Garfield	Rifle	86.850	139.772	87	West Rifle (US 6)	
Garfield	Rifle	90.422	145.520	90	SH 13 north – Rifle, Meeker	Eastbound entrance ramp includes direct entrance from Airport Road
Garfield		93.991	151.264	94	Garfield County Regional Airport	
Garfield	Silt	97.427	156.794	97	I-70 BS north – Silt	
Garfield		105.260	169.400	105	New Castle	
Garfield	Chacra	109.000	175.418	109	Canyon Creek (US 6 west)	Western end of concurrency with US 6
Garfield	Chacra	111.328	179.165	111	South Canyon	
Garfield	Glenwood Springs	114.295	183.940	114	West Glenwood (US 6 east)	Dumbbell interchange; eastern end of concurrency with US 6
Garfield	Glenwood Springs	116.380	187.295	116	SH 82 east (Grand Avenue) / US 6 west – Glenwood Springs, Aspen	Partial dumbbell interchange; western end of concurrency with US 6
Garfield		118.640	190.933	119	No Name	
Garfield		120.954	194.657	121	Grizzly Creek to Hanging Lake	Hanging Lake appears only on westbound signage
Garfield		122.660	197.402	123	Shoshone	Eastbound exit and westbound entrance
Garfield		125.061	201.266	125	Hanging Lake	Eastbound exit and westbound entrance
Garfield		125.269	201.601	Hanging Lake Tunnel		
Garfield		128.317	206.506	129	Bair Ranch	
Eagle		133.384– 134.053	214.661– 215.737	133	Dotsero	
Eagle	Gypsum	139.533	224.557	140	Gypsum (US 6 east)	Eastern end of concurrency with US 6
Eagle	Eagle	146.648	236.007	147	Eagle	
Eagle		156.547	251.938	157	SH 131 north – Wolcott, Steamboat Springs	
Eagle		162.782	261.972	163	I-70 BS south – Edwards	
Eagle	Avon	166.635	268.173	167	Avon	
Eagle	Avon	168.157	270.622	168	William J. Post Boulevard – Avon East Entrance	
Eagle	Eagle-Vail	168.758	271.590	169	US 6 – Eagle-Vail	Westbound exit and eastbound entrance
Eagle		171.105	275.367	171	US 6 west / US 24 east – Minturn, Leadville	Western end of concurrency with US 6; western terminus of US 24
Eagle	Vail	173.319	278.930	173	West Vail	
Eagle	Vail	176.057	283.336	176	Vail Ski Area – Vail Museum	
Eagle	Vail	179.866	289.466	180	East Vail	
Vail Pass		189.981	305.745	Elevation 10,662 feet (3,250 m)		
Summit		190.095	305.928	190	Shrine Pass Road – Vail Pass rest area	
Summit		195.298	314.302	195	SH 91 south – Copper Mountain, Leadville	
Summit		197.854	318.415	198	Officers Gulch	
Summit	Frisco	200.995	323.470	201	Main Street – Frisco, Breckenridge	Breckenridge appears only on eastbound signage; Main Street appears only on westbound signage
Summit	Frisco	202.352	325.654	203	SH 9 south – Frisco, Breckenridge	Western end of concurrency with SH 9; Breckenridge appears only on westbound signage
Summit	Silverthorne	205.423	330.596	205	SH 9 north (Blue River Parkway) / US 6 east – Silverthorne, Dillon	Eastern end of concurrency with US 6/SH 9
Continental Divide		213.651– 215.340	343.838– 346.556	Eisenhower Tunnel		
Clear Creek		216.185	347.916	216	US 6 west – Loveland Pass	Western end of concurrency with US 6
Clear Creek		218.346	351.394	218	(no name)	Connects to Herman Gulch Road
Clear Creek		221.297	356.143	221	Bakerville	
Clear Creek	Silver Plume	225.719	363.260	226	Silver Plume	
Clear Creek	Georgetown	227.910	366.786	228	Georgetown	
Clear Creek		231.889	373.189	232	US 40 west – Empire, Granby	Western end of concurrency with US 40
Clear Creek		233.047	375.053	233	Lawson	Eastbound exit only
Clear Creek		234.209	376.923	234	Downieville, Dumont, Lawson	Dumont appears only on eastbound signage; Lawson appears only on westbound signage
Clear Creek		235.005	378.204	235	Dumont	Westbound exit and eastbound entrance
Clear Creek		237.660	382.477	238	Fall River Road	
Clear Creek	Idaho Springs	238.704– 239.267	384.157– 385.063	239	I-70 BL east – Idaho Springs	No eastbound entrance; I-70 Bus. appears only on eastbound signage
Clear Creek	Idaho Springs	239.652	385.683	240	SH 103 / Mount Blue Sky Scenic Byway – Mt. Blue Sky	
Clear Creek	Idaho Springs	241.125	388.053	241	I-70 BL west – Idaho Springs	I-70 Bus. appears only on westbound signage
Clear Creek	Idaho Springs	242.292	389.931	Veterans Memorial Tunnels		
Clear Creek	Idaho Springs	242.980	391.038	243	Hidden Valley, Central City	
Clear Creek		244.260	393.098	244	US 6 / US 40 east – Golden	Left exit eastbound; left entrance westbound; no eastbound entrance; eastern end of concurrency with US 6/US 40
Clear Creek		246.602	396.867	247	Beaver Brook, Floyd Hill	Eastbound exit and westbound entrance
Jefferson		247.604	398.480	248	Beaver Brook, Floyd Hill	Westbound exit and eastbound entrance
Jefferson		250.769	403.574	251	El Rancho	Eastbound exit and westbound entrance
Jefferson		251.318	404.457	252	SH 74 (Evergreen Parkway) / US 40 west	Westbound exit and eastbound entrance; western end of concurrency with US 40
Jefferson		252.244	405.947	253	Chief Hosa	
Jefferson		253.528	408.014	254	US 40 east – Genesee Park	Eastern end of concurrency with US 40
Jefferson		255.974	411.950	256	Lookout Mountain	
Jefferson		258.722	416.373	259	US 40 east – Golden, Morrison	Eastbound signage
Jefferson		258.722	416.373	259	CR 93 – Morrison	Westbound signage
Jefferson	Golden	259.803	418.112	260	SH 470 – Boulder, Colorado Springs	SH 470 exit 1; no westbound exit or eastbound entrance from SH 470 EB
Jefferson		261.030	420.087	261	US 6 east (6th Avenue)	Eastbound exit and westbound entrance
Jefferson		261.630	421.053	262	US 40 / I-70 BL (Colfax Avenue) to US 6	I-70 Bus. appears only on eastbound signage; US 6 appears only on westbound signage
Jefferson	Lakewood	262.571	422.567	263	Colorado Mills Parkway – Denver West	
Jefferson	Wheat Ridge	264.341	425.416	264	Youngfield Street / 32nd Avenue	
Jefferson	Wheat Ridge	265.343	427.028	265	SH 58 west – Golden, Central City	
Jefferson	Wheat Ridge	265.726	427.645	266	SH 72 (Ward Road) / 44th Avenue	
Jefferson	Wheat Ridge	267.402	430.342	267	SH 391 (Kipling Street)	
Jefferson	Arvada	269.005	432.922	269A	SH 121 (Wadsworth Boulevard)	
Jefferson	Arvada	269.242	433.303	269B	I-76 east – Fort Morgan	Eastbound left exit and westbound entrance; western terminus of I-76
Jefferson	Wheat Ridge–Lakeside line	270.000	434.523	270	SH 95 (Sheridan Boulevard) / Harlan Street	SH 95 (Sheridan Blvd.) not signed westbound
Jefferson–Denver county line	Lakeside–Denver line	270.496	435.321	271A	SH 95 (Sheridan Boulevard)	Westbound exit and eastbound entrance
City and County of Denver		271.549	437.016	271B	Lowell Boulevard / Tennyson Street	Westbound exit and eastbound entrance
City and County of Denver		272.005	437.750	272	US 287 (Federal Boulevard)	
City and County of Denver		273.015	439.375	273	Pecos Street	
City and County of Denver		274.062	441.060	274	US 6 west / US 85 south / I-25 (US 87) – Fort Collins, Colorado Springs	The Mousetrap; western end of concurrency with US 6/US 85; exit 214A on I-25
City and County of Denver		274.607	441.937	275A	Washington Street	Eastbound access is part of exit 274
City and County of Denver		275.252	442.975	275B	Brighton Boulevard (SH 265 north) / York Street	York St. signed eastbound only
City and County of Denver		275.545	443.447	275C	York Street / Josephine Street	Closed; was eastbound exit and westbound entrance
City and County of Denver		276.080	444.308	276A	US 6 east / US 85 north (Vasquez Boulevard)	Eastern end of concurrency with US 6/US 85; westbound access via exit 276
City and County of Denver		276.572	445.099	276B	SH 2 (Colorado Boulevard) / Dahlia Street	Eastbound exit and westbound entrance
City and County of Denver		276.572	445.099	276	SH 2 (Colorado Boulevard) to US 6 east / US 85 north (Vasquez Boulevard)	Westbound exit and eastbound entrance
City and County of Denver		276.797– 278.319	445.462– 447.911	277	Holly Street / Monaco Street / Dahlia Street	Monaco St. signed eastbound only, Dahlia St. signed westbound only
City and County of Denver		278.548	448.280	278	SH 35 (Quebec Street) / Monaco Street	Monaco St. signed westbound only
City and County of Denver		279.086	449.145	279A	I-270 west (US 36 west) – Fort Collins, Boulder	Westbound exit and eastbound entrance; western end of concurrency with US 36
City and County of Denver		279.591	449.958	279B	Central Park Boulevard	
City and County of Denver		280.567	451.529	280	Havana Street	
City and County of Denver		281.560	453.127	281	Peoria Street	Westbound access is part of exit 282
Denver–Adams county line	Denver–Aurora line	282.271– 283.180	454.271– 455.734	282	I-225 south – Aurora, Colorado Springs	Exit 12 on I-225
Adams	Aurora	283.532	456.301	283	Chambers Road	
Adams	Aurora	283.623	456.447	284	Peña Boulevard east – Denver International Airport	Eastbound exit and westbound entrance; westbound connection made via exit 285
Adams	Aurora	284.627	458.063	285	Airport Boulevard	
Adams	Aurora	285.727	459.833	286	Tower Road	
Adams	Aurora			287	Picadilly Road	Diverging diamond interchange
Adams–Arapahoe county line	Aurora	288.219	463.844	288	I-70 BL / US 40 west / US 287 north (Colfax Avenue)	Left exit westbound; no westbound entrance; I-70 Bus. appears only on westbound signage; western end of concurrency with US 40/US 287
Adams–Arapahoe county line	Aurora	289.028	465.145	289	E-470 – Fort Collins, Colorado Springs	Exit 20 on E-470
Adams–Arapahoe county line	Aurora				Aerotropolis Parkway	Under construction
Adams–Arapahoe county line	Aurora	292.128	470.134	292	SH 36 east (Airpark Road)	Former US 36 east
Adams–Arapahoe county line		295.256	475.168	295	I-70 BS north – Watkins	
Adams–Arapahoe county line		299.328	481.722	299	Manila Road	
Adams–Arapahoe county line	Bennett	304.360	489.820	304	SH 79 north – Bennett	
Adams–Arapahoe county line	Bennett	305.259	491.267	305	Kiowa	Eastbound exit only
Adams–Arapahoe county line	Bennett	305.784	492.112	306	SH 36 – Kiowa, Bennett	No eastbound signage; no eastbound entrance; former US 36
Arapahoe		310.165	499.162	310	Strasburg	
Arapahoe		315.913	508.413	316	US 36 east / SH 36 west – Byers	Eastern end of concurrency with US 36; unsigned SH 36 is former US 36 west
Arapahoe		322.086	518.347	322	Peoria	
Arapahoe	Deer Trail	328.329	528.394	328	I-70 BS south – Deer Trail	
Elbert		336.787	542.006	336	Lowland	
Elbert		340.354	547.747	340	I-70 BS west – Agate	
Elbert		348.731	561.228	348	Cedar Point	
Elbert		352.340	567.036	352	SH 86 west – Kiowa	
Elbert		354.537	570.572	354	(no name)	
Lincoln	Limon	359.499	578.558	359	I-70 BL east to US 24 / SH 71 – Limon	Eastbound signage
Lincoln	Limon	359.499	578.558	359	US 24 – Colorado Springs	Westbound signage
Lincoln	Limon	361.743	582.169	361	I-70 BL to SH 71 – Limon	SH 71 appears only on eastbound signage
Lincoln		363.025	584.232	363	US 40 east / US 287 south – Hugo, Kit Carson	Eastbound signage; eastern end of concurrency with US 40/US 287
Lincoln		363.025	584.232	363	I-70 BL / US 24 west to SH 71 – Limon	Westbound signage; western end of concurrency with US 24
Lincoln		371.482	597.842	371	Genoa, Hugo	Hugo appears only on westbound signage
Lincoln		376.520	605.950	376	Bovina	
Lincoln	Arriba	383.496	617.177	383	Arriba	
Kit Carson		394.564	634.989	395	Flagler	
Kit Carson	Seibert	405.065	651.889	405	US 24 east / SH 59 – Seibert	Eastern end of concurrency with US 24
Kit Carson		411.961	662.987	412	Vona	
Kit Carson		419.311	674.816	419	SH 57 – Stratton	
Kit Carson		428.824	690.125	429	Bethune	
Kit Carson	Burlington	436.788	702.942	437	I-70 BL / US 385 (Lincoln Street)	I-70 Bus. appears only on eastbound signage
Kit Carson	Burlington	438.225	705.255	438	I-70 BL / US 24 (Rose Avenue)	I-70 Bus. appears only on westbound signage; western end of concurrency with US 24
Kit Carson		449.589	723.543		I-70 east / US-24 east – Goodland, Salina	Continuation into Kansas
1.000 mi = 1.609 km; 1.000 km = 0.621 mi: Concurrency terminus; Incomplete access; Unopened

== See also ==
- Business routes of Interstate 70 in Colorado

Interstate 70
Previous state: Utah	Colorado	Next state: Kansas
