= Mousetrap (Denver) =

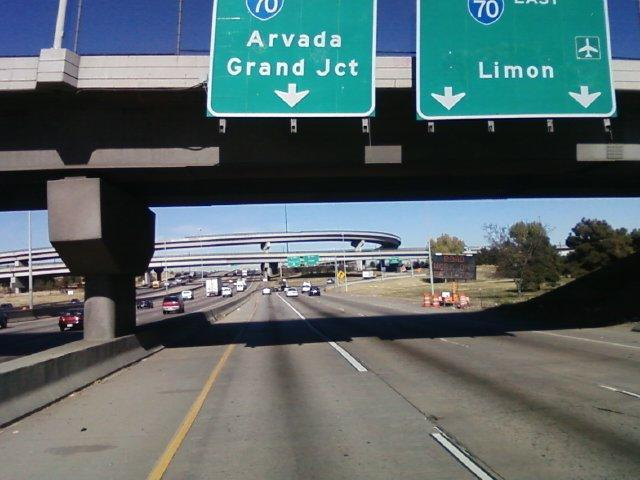
- Interstate 25 northbound offramp to Interstate 70

Location
- Denver, Colorado
- Coordinates: 39.779305°N 104.989793°W
- Roads at junction: I-25; I-70

Construction
- Type: Clover-stack Interchange
- Constructed: 1951
- Maintained by: CDOT

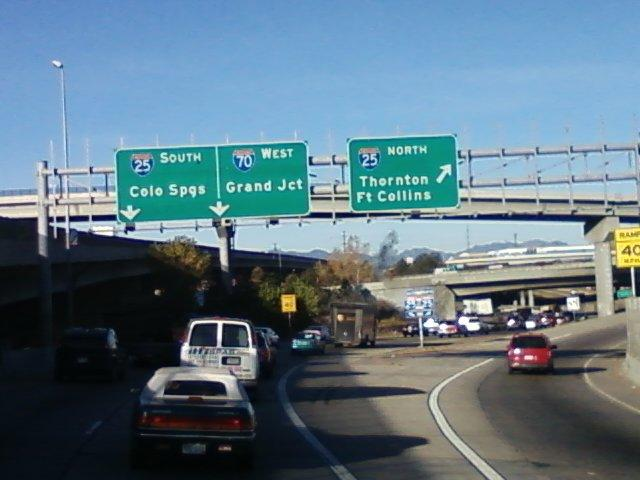
Interstate 70 westbound off ramp to Interstate 25

The Mousetrap is an informal name for the interchange of Interstate 25 and Interstate 70 in the northern part of Denver, Colorado, United States. The interchange pre-dates the Interstate Highway System, originally built as an intersection between two local roads in 1951. The interchange was completely rebuilt, starting in 1987. The re-design was prompted from an incident where a U.S. Navy truck hauling torpedoes overturned, causing panic and major disruptions in the city.

== History ==
The interchange was built in 1951, as an intersection between 46th Avenue, and U.S. Highway 87. The name "mousetrap" was coined by the long-time airborne radio traffic reporter Don Martin in the 1960s, calling the interchange "a maze that could trap a mouse". In the original design, interchange ramps included sharp curves, some of which were left exits instead of right exits. When construction began on Interstate 70, the alignment of 46th Avenue was used for the freeway, while Interstate 25 was built directly over top of the alignment of US 87. Although the design of the Mousetrap did not conform to Interstate Highway standards, the interchange was grandfathered into the Interstate Highway system.

== U.S. Navy torpedo incident ==
One accident at the Mousetrap had national ramifications. On August 1, 1984, a truck carrying six torpedoes to Connecticut for the U.S. Navy overturned. The situation was made worse as no one answered at the phone number provided with the cargo, and an unknown liquid was leaking from one of the torpedoes. It took more than three hours before any military personnel arrived on the scene—U.S. Army personnel from a nearby base. The incident left thousands of cars stranded and Denver's transportation network paralyzed for about eight hours. Approximately 50 residents in the area were evacuated. Investigations later revealed that the truck driver did not follow a recommended route provided by the state police, and was specifically warned to avoid the Mousetrap. The Navy promised reforms after being criticized for not providing a valid, staffed phone number with a hazardous cargo shipment, a violation of federal law, and failing to notify Denver officials about the shipment. The incident provided momentum to rebuild the interchange with a more modern and safer design. Construction began in several phases in 1987 and the last bridge was dedicated in 2003.
