= Wildridge, Colorado =

Coordinates: 38.7967°N 104.8203°W

Wildridge, Colorado is located above the commercial core of Avon on the opposite side of the Eagle Valley from Beaver Creek. Note that hiking can be done over the peak to the Vail town side.

== Community Association ==
The Wildridge neighborhood faces a number of challenges because it was created as a Homeowners' association community with no source of funding to operate to make changes to the original PUD. As such there is no governing body to protect the rights of the Wildridge residents and they are often left out of benefits shared by the other Avon taxpayer base such as bus service.

== Bus Service ==
Bus Service did once exist to the Wildridge community but it was dropped many years ago. It has been on the ballot several times by candidates but has never been approved. As such the residents do not enjoy bus service to the ski resorts while parking and gasoline expenses increase.
