= Dotsero, Colorado =

Unincorporated community in Colorado, US

- Census-designated place
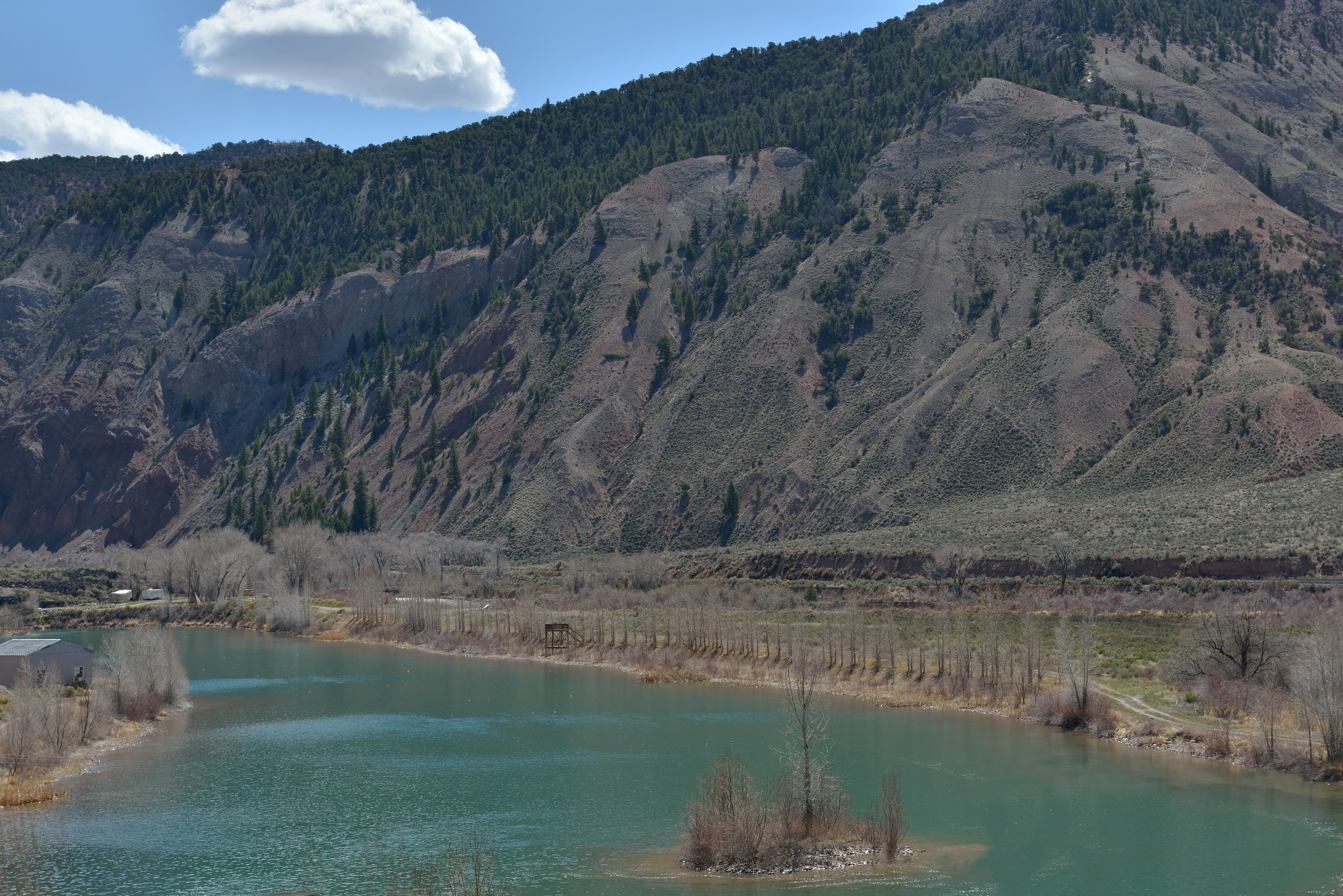
- Confluence of the Eagle and the Colorado rivers at Dotsero

- Location of the Dotsero CDP in Eagle County, Colorado
- Coordinates: 39°38′46″N 107°03′55″W
- Country: United States
- State: Colorado
- County: Eagle

Government
  - Type: unincorporated community
  - Body: Eagle County

Area
  - Total: 1.551 sq mi (4.017 km^{2})
  - Land: 1.356 sq mi (3.511 km^{2})
  - Water: 0.195 sq mi (0.506 km^{2})
- Elevation: 6,155 ft (1,876 m)

Population (2020)
  - Total: 1,172
- Time zone: UTC−07:00 (MST)
  - Summer (DST): UTC−06:00 (MDT)
- ZIP code: Gypsum 81637
- Area codes: 970/748
- GNIS town ID: 2583232
- FIPS code: 08-021155

Dotsero is an unincorporated community and a census-designated place (CDP) located in and governed by Eagle County, Colorado, United States. The CDP is a part of the Edwards, CO Micropolitan Statistical Area. The population of the Dotsero CDP was 1,172 at the United States Census 2020. The Gypsum post office (Zip Code 81637) serves the area.

== History ==
Dotsero is an important railroad junction point on the Central Corridor of the Union Pacific Railroad (formerly Denver and Rio Grande Western Railroad until 1992), on its Denver to Salt Lake City line. The railroad, built in 1881 by the then narrow gauge Denver & Rio Grande, was en route westward from Pueblo, Colorado through the Royal Gorge of the Arkansas River and over Tennessee Pass, passing through the site of Dotsero and onward to Grand Junction.

Through the years, efforts were made to have a more direct connection between Denver and Salt Lake that did not require detouring through Pueblo. The Denver and Salt Lake Railroad (D&SL) built a line west from Denver and entered the Colorado River canyon near Bond, Colorado, about 40 miles (64 km) Northeast of Dotsero. The D&SL was never finished as a separate route to Salt Lake City; however, it was eventually acquired by the D&RGW, who built a connection between Dotsero and Orestod (Dotsero spelled backwards) near Bond. This connection, commonly known as the Dotsero Cutoff, was completed on June 15, 1934 and finally provided Denver with a direct link to Salt Lake City, making Dotsero the junction between the old and new routes to Denver. After completion the old route over Tennessee pass remained in use as a secondary route, but has been dormant since 1997.

The Dotsero, Colorado, post office operated from June 29, 1883, until February 29, 1948. The Gypsum, Colorado, post office (ZIP code 81637) now serves the area. The Dotsero station existed from the construction of the standard gauge railroad line to Glenwood Springs in the 1890s.

=== Etymology ===
Ferdinand Hayden published an extensive survey of central and southwest Colorado in 1877, and used the location of the town of Dotsero as his "Dot Zero" (reference point) for his survey maps.

== Geography ==
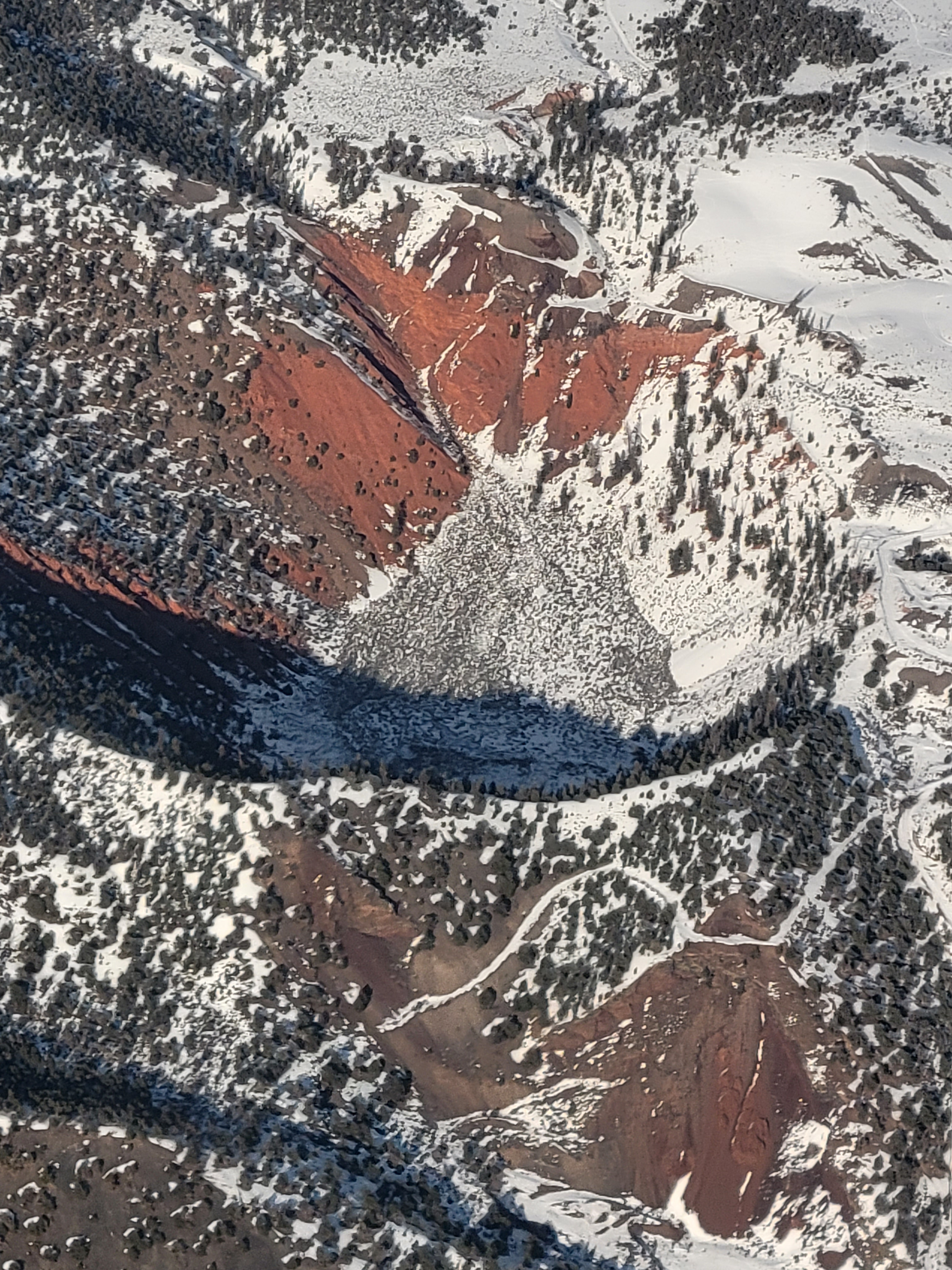
Aerial photo of Dotsero Crater.

Dotsero is located at the confluence of the Eagle River with the Colorado River, along U.S. Highway 6 and Interstate 70, near the head of Glenwood Canyon, approximately 5 miles (8 km) west of Gypsum.

The Dotsero CDP has an area of 993 acres (4.017 km^{2}), including 125 acres (0.506 km^{2}) of water.

=== Dotsero Volcano ===
Dotsero is built at the base of Colorado's most recently active volcano, the Dotsero Volcano, which, according to the United States Geological Survey, erupted 4,140 years ago. The volcano is still classified as active by the USGS and is the only active volcano within Colorado.

The main industry at Dotsero for years consisted of making cinderblocks from the volcano.

== Demographics ==
=== 2020 census ===
As of the 2020 census, Dotsero had a population of 1,172. The median age was 29.1 years. 33.5% of residents were under the age of 18 and 3.8% of residents were 65 years of age or older. For every 100 females there were 114.7 males, and for every 100 females age 18 and over there were 120.7 males age 18 and over.

94.8% of residents lived in urban areas, while 5.2% lived in rural areas.

There were 327 households in Dotsero, of which 49.5% had children under the age of 18 living in them. Of all households, 65.1% were married-couple households, 14.7% were households with a male householder and no spouse or partner present, and 12.2% were households with a female householder and no spouse or partner present. About 8.5% of all households were made up of individuals and 1.8% had someone living alone who was 65 years of age or older.

There were 334 housing units, of which 2.1% were vacant. The homeowner vacancy rate was 0.0% and the rental vacancy rate was 0.0%.

Racial composition as of the 2020 census
Race	Number	Percent
White	435	37.1%
Black or African American	3	0.3%
American Indian and Alaska Native	16	1.4%
Asian	5	0.4%
Native Hawaiian and Other Pacific Islander	0	0.0%
Some other race	298	25.4%
Two or more races	415	35.4%
Hispanic or Latino (of any race)	831	70.9%

=== 2010 census ===
The United States Census Bureau initially defined the Dotsero CDP for the United States Census 2010.

Dotsero CDP, Colorado
Year	Pop.	±%
2010	705	—
2020	1,172	+66.2%
Source: United States Census Bureau

== See also ==
- Edwards, CO Micropolitan Statistical Area
