= Eagle Valley High School =

Location
- 641 Valley Road; Gypsum, Colorado 81637; United States; 39°38′36″N 106°56′53″W

Information
- Type: Public high school
- School district: Eagle County School District RE-50
- CEEB code: 060725
- Principal: Tom LaFramboise
- Staff: 95
- Teaching staff: 65.16 (FTE)
- Grades: 9-12
- Enrollment: 1,003 (2023–2024)
- Student to teacher ratio: 15.39
- Campus type: Rural
- Colors: Black, white, red
- Mascot: Hot Stuff the Little Devil
- Website: evhs.eagleschools.net

Eagle Valley High School (EVHS) is a four-year public high school located in Gypsum, Colorado.

== Academics ==
Both Advanced Placement and dual-enrollment courses are available at the school. Four adjunct Colorado Mountain College educators teach there.

$11,834 is spent per student.

The student-to-teacher ratio is 17.7.

== Enrollment ==
EVHS has 950 students enrolled. Of those, approximately 51% are Hispanic, 46% are Caucasian, and 3% are classified as "other." 52% identify as male, 44% identify as female. 28% of students are classified as economically disadvantaged. 23% are in the free lunch program. 6% are in the reduced-price lunch program.

== Faculty ==
EVHS has approximately 95 staff members: sixty-two teachers, four Colorado Mountain College adjunct faculty, four counselors, and four administrators.

== Ratings ==
U.S. News ranks EVHS 3,949th nationally, 98th on the state scale, and third in the Eagle County School District as of 2024.
