= Hanging Lake Tunnel =

Tunnel in Colorado

Coordinates: 39.588575°N 107.186007°W

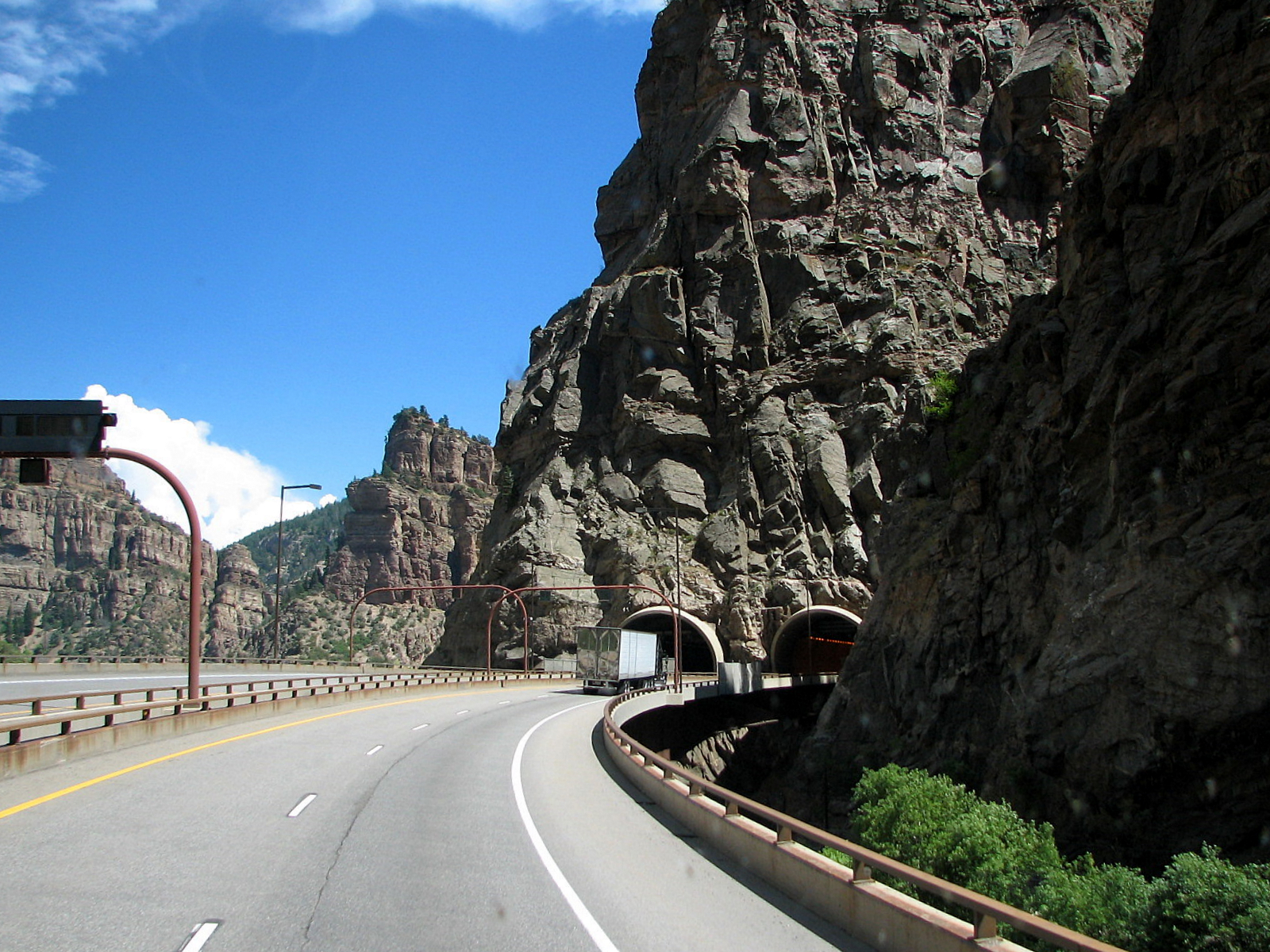
- Western Portal to the Tunnel
- Interactive map of Hanging Lake Tunnel

Overview
- Location: Garfield County, Colorado, United States
- Route: I-70 / US 6

Operation
- Work began: 1980
- Opened: October 14, 1992

Technical
- Length: 4,000 feet (1,200 m)
- No. of lanes: 2

The Hanging Lake Tunnel is a dual bore highway tunnel carrying Interstate 70 (I-70) and U.S. Highway 6 (US 6) through the southern wall of Glenwood Canyon, just east of exit 125 in Garfield County, Colorado, United States. The tunnel is named for Hanging Lake, which resides in a side canyon to Glenwood Canyon and is accessible via a trail head at a rest area near the western portal of the tunnel.

== Description ==
Each bore is 4,000 feet (1,200 m) long. The tunnels house a command center, which is accessed from a hangar door inside. The command center monitors cameras through the canyon, and are used to control variable message signs to slow down or re-direct traffic, engage contraflow in the event of an accident, and dispatch tow trucks. This command center also monitors the tunnels under Wolf Creek Pass along US 160. The height limit for vehicles is 16'4" (not oversize loads)

== History ==
Construction began on the Glenwood Canyon Area in 1980, being one of the last portions of the Interstate highway system to be completed. The tunnels were completed in 1992 as part of the larger Glenwood Canyon project along I-70, totalling $490 million.

On March 30, 2007, the eastbound bore of the Hanging Lake Tunnel was closed after a large crack was discovered in its ceiling. Both directions of traffic were routed through the westbound bore until the first week of December 2007 while repairs were made.
