= Glenwood Canyon =

Scenic canyon in Colorado

Coordinates: 39.575°N 107.223°W

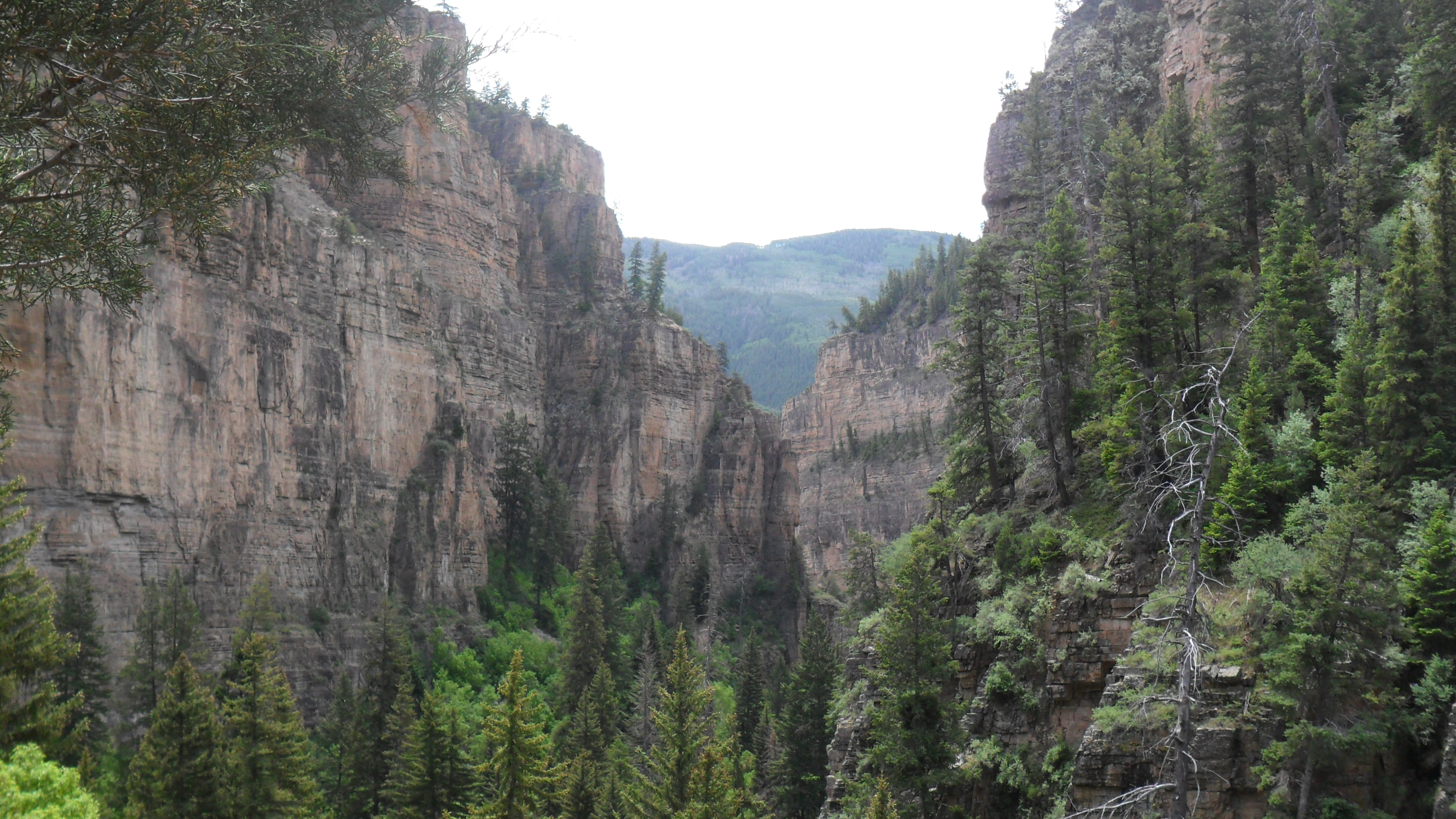
View down Glenwood Canyon from Hanging Lake

Glenwood Canyon is a rugged scenic 12.5 mi (20 km) canyon in western Colorado in the United States. Its walls climb as high as 1,300 feet (400 m) above the Colorado River. It is the largest such canyon on the Upper Colorado. The canyon, which has historically provided the routes of railroads and highways through western Colorado, currently furnishes the routes of Interstate 70 and the Union Pacific's Central Corridor between Denver and Grand Junction.

== Location ==
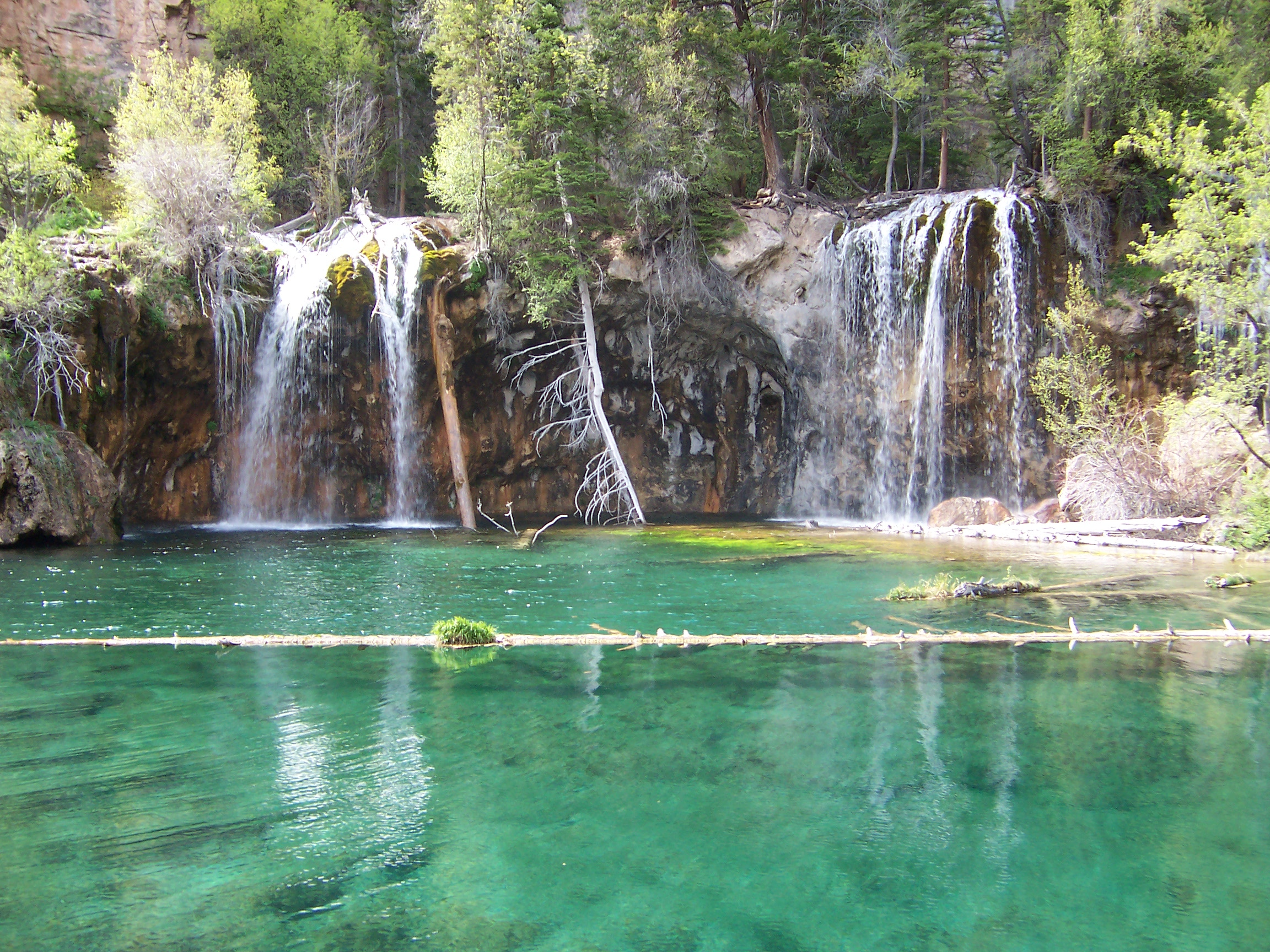
Hanging Lake is located in Glenwood Canyon

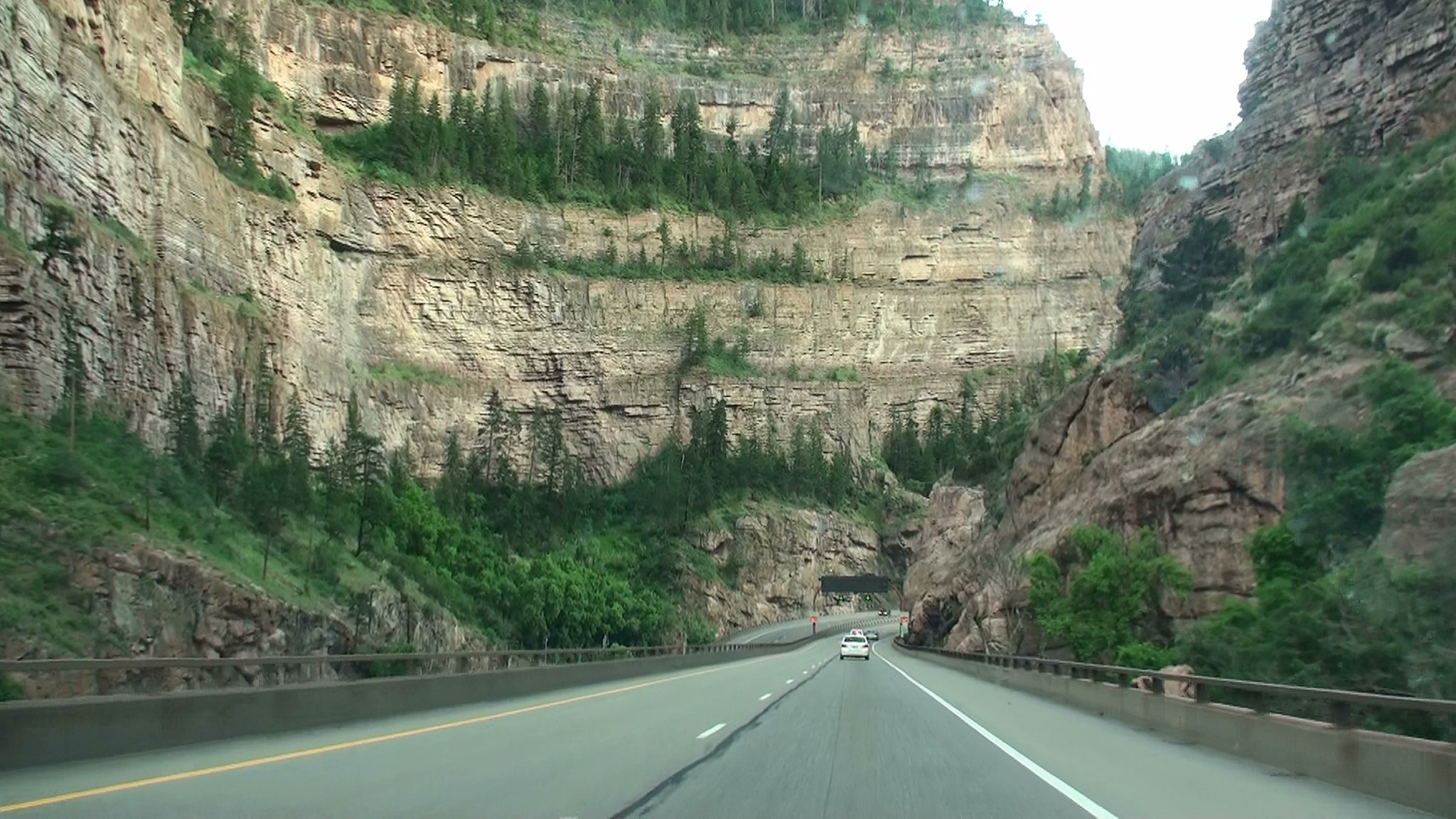
I-70 (westbound) through Glenwood Canyon

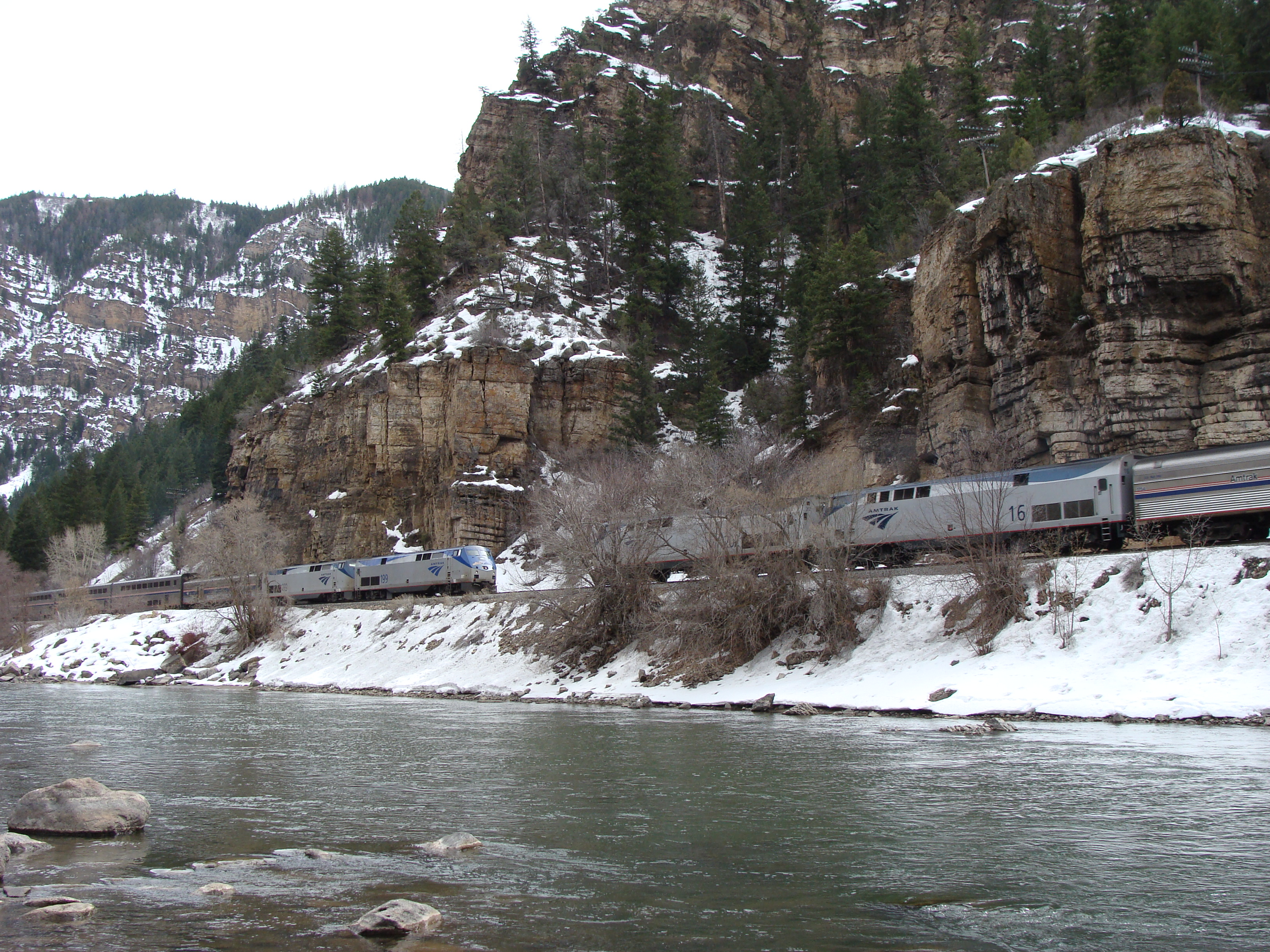
The eastbound and westbound California Zephyrs meet in the Glenwood Canyon

The canyon stretches from near Dotsero, where the Colorado receives the Eagle River, downstream in a west-southwest direction to just east of Glenwood Springs, on the mouth of the Roaring Fork. Most of the canyon is in Garfield County, with the upper portion near Dotsero lying in Eagle County.

== Geology ==
The canyon was formed relatively recently in Pleistocene time by the rapid cutting of the Colorado down through layers of sedimentary rock. The upper layers of the canyon are sandstone from Pennsylvanian and Mississippian. Sections of the lower canyon walls are made of Cambrian rock. The Mississippian layer that is prominent throughout much of the upper rim sections of the canyon is part of the Leadville Formation.

== Railroads ==
In 1906, the canyon provided the route of the Taylor State Road, a gravel road that was the first route for automobiles through the Colorado Rockies. The canyon also provided the route for the Denver and Rio Grande Western Railroad in the late 19th century. Through acquisitions, the line is currently part of the Union Pacific system, comprising part of its Central Corridor between Denver and Grand Junction.

As Glenwood Canyon was one of the iconic scenic views along the California Zephyr passenger train, a monument to the dome car design was originally installed in the canyon. In the 1990s, the monument was relocated to the Colorado Railroad Museum in Golden to make way for the construction on Interstate 70.

== Interstate 70 ==
The canyon is widely considered one of the most scenic natural features on the Interstate Highway System of the United States. Foot access to the canyon is available at four rest areas along Interstate 70 in the canyon. The Hanging Lake Rest Area (exit 125) provides access to the canyon along a stretch where I-70 is concealed in the Hanging Lake Tunnel. The freeway is also prone to rockslides in the canyon, such as the ones that closed it in February 2016 and July 2021.

== See also ==
- Gore Canyon
