= Gypsum, Colorado =

Town in Colorado, United States

- Home rule municipality
- Town of Gypsum
- Location of the Town of Gypsum in Eagle County, Colorado
- Coordinates: 39°38′40″N 106°56′25″W
- Country: United States
- State: Colorado
- County: Eagle County
- Incorporated (town): November 25, 1911

Government
  - Type: Home rule municipality

Area
  - Home rule municipality: 8.966 sq mi (23.222 km^{2})
  - Land: 8.851 sq mi (22.924 km^{2})
  - Water: 0.115 sq mi (0.298 km^{2})
- Elevation: 6,401 ft (1,951 m)

Population (2020)
  - Home rule municipality: 8,040
  - Density: 908/sq mi (351/km^{2})
  - Metro: 55,731
  - CSA: 134,774
- Time zone: UTC−07:00 (MST)
  - Summer (DST): UTC−06:00 (MDT)
- ZIP code: 81637
- Area code: 970
- FIPS code: 08-33695
- GNIS feature ID: 2412716
- Website: www.townofgypsum.com

The Town of Gypsum is the home rule municipality that is the most populous municipality in Eagle County, Colorado, United States. The town population was 8,040 at the 2020 United States census, a +24.13% increase since the 2010 United States census. Gypsum is a part of the Edwards, CO Micropolitan Statistical Area. Gypsum is the home of an American Gypsum drywall plant and mine.

== History ==
The town was named for nearby gypsum deposits, and was incorporated in 1911.

== Geography ==
Gypsum is located in western Eagle County in the valley of the Eagle River, a west-flowing tributary of the Colorado River. U.S. Route 6 passes through the center of town, leading east (upriver) 7 miles (11 km) to Eagle, the county seat. Interstate 70 runs along the northern edge of Gypsum, with access from Exit 140. I-70 leads east 133 miles (214 km) to Denver and west 110 miles (180 km) to Grand Junction.

At the 2020 United States census, the town had a total area of 5,738 acres (23.222 km^{2}) including 74 acres (0.298 km^{2}) of water.

=== Climate ===
This climate type is dominated by the winter season, a long, bitterly cold period with short, clear days, relatively little precipitation mostly in the form of snow, and low humidity. According to the Köppen Climate Classification system, Gypsum has a subarctic climate, abbreviated "Dfc" on climate maps.

Climate data for Gypsum, Colorado
Month	Jan	Feb	Mar	Apr	May	Jun	Jul	Aug	Sep	Oct	Nov	Dec	Year
Mean daily maximum °F (°C)	33 (1)	39 (4)	46 (8)	57 (14)	68 (20)	78 (26)	86 (30)	82 (28)	75 (24)	62 (17)	46 (8)	33 (1)	59 (15)
Mean daily minimum °F (°C)	3 (−16)	8 (−13)	19 (−7)	26 (−3)	32 (0)	37 (3)	44 (7)	42 (6)	33 (1)	26 (−3)	15 (−9)	5 (−15)	24 (−4)
Average precipitation inches (mm)	0.9 (23)	0.6 (15)	0.8 (20)	0.8 (20)	0.8 (20)	0.9 (23)	1.2 (30)	1.1 (28)	1 (25)	0.9 (23)	0.7 (18)	0.9 (23)	10.5 (270)
Source: Weatherbase

=== Moon simulation ===
The variable terrain around Gypsum was certified in August 2025 as suitable for training astronauts for moon landing missions. Astronauts visiting the local High-Altitude Army National Guard Aviation Training Site land helicopters to refine their landing skills on disorienting slopes with variable surfaces and dynamic lighting and shadow conditions.

== Demographics ==
Historical population
Census	Pop.	Note	%±
1920	164		—
1930	165		0.6%
1940	245		48.5%
1950	345		40.8%
1960	358		3.8%
1970	420		17.3%
1980	743		76.9%
1990	1,750		135.5%
2000	3,654		108.8%
2010	6,477		77.3%
2020	8,040		24.1%
U.S. Decennial Census

=== 2020 census ===
As of the 2020 census, Gypsum had a population of 8,040. The median age was 33.8 years. 27.9% of residents were under the age of 18 and 7.5% of residents were 65 years of age or older. For every 100 females there were 109.9 males, and for every 100 females age 18 and over there were 108.1 males age 18 and over.

96.1% of residents lived in urban areas, while 3.9% lived in rural areas.

There were 2,531 households in Gypsum, of which 47.3% had children under the age of 18 living in them. Of all households, 65.1% were married-couple households, 14.8% were households with a male householder and no spouse or partner present, and 13.9% were households with a female householder and no spouse or partner present. About 11.9% of all households were made up of individuals and 4.1% had someone living alone who was 65 years of age or older.

There were 2,611 housing units, of which 3.1% were vacant. The homeowner vacancy rate was 0.6% and the rental vacancy rate was 3.3%.

Racial composition as of the 2020 census
Race	Number	Percent
White	4,577	56.9%
Black or African American	26	0.3%
American Indian and Alaska Native	123	1.5%
Asian	76	0.9%
Native Hawaiian and Other Pacific Islander	2	0.0%
Some other race	1,424	17.7%
Two or more races	1,812	22.5%
Hispanic or Latino (of any race)	3,949	49.1%

=== 2000 census ===
As of the census of 2000, there were 3,654 people, 1,150 households, and 917 families residing in the town. The population density was 992.8 inhabitants per square mile (383.3/km^{2}). There were 1,210 housing units at an average density of 328.8 per square mile (127.0/km^{2}). The racial makeup of the town was 81.28% White, 0.16% Black, 1.31% Native American, 0.22% Asian, 0.05% Pacific Islander, 15.00% from other races, and 1.97% from two or more races. Hispanic or Latino of any race were 31.31% of the population.

There were 1,150 households, out of which 51.2% had children under the age of 18 living with them, 68.8% were married couples living together, 6.8% had a female householder with no husband present, and 20.2% were non-families. 12.3% of all households were made up of individuals, and 1.3% had someone living alone who was 65 years of age or older. The average household size was 3.17 and the average family size was 3.47.

In the town, the population was spread out, with 33.1% under the age of 18, 8.8% from 18 to 24, 38.7% from 25 to 44, 17.2% from 45 to 64, and 2.2% who were 65 years of age or older. The median age was 30 years. For every 100 females, there were 110.2 males. For every 100 females age 18 and over, there were 109.7 males.

The median income for a household in the town was $59,671, and the median income for a family was $62,384. Males had a median income of $40,139 versus $29,764 for females. The per capita income for the town was $21,790. About 4.4% of families and 5.5% of the population were below the poverty line, including 6.4% of those under age 18 and 9.0% of those age 65 or over.

== Infrastructure ==
=== Transportation ===
Gypsum is the location of the Eagle County Regional Airport (EGE), a popular regional airport used in the winter to transport skiers to nearby Vail, 35 miles (56 km) to the east.

Gypsum is also the location of several CORE TRANSIT stops, there are stops at Jules Dr, Eagle Valley High School, Eagle County Regional Airport, Cooley Mesa Rd, and Navajo Rd. $1 fee for youth and $3 fee for adults, and for the elderly, a $1 fee.

=== Education ===
It is in the Eagle County School District RE 50.

Schools include:

- Eagle Valley High School
- Gypsum Creek Middle School
- Red Hill Elementary School
- Gypsum Elementary School

== American Gypsum ==
The largest industry in the town is American Gypsum's (formerly Centex and before that, Eagle Gypsum Limited) drywall plant. The facility produces a variety of wallboard products, which is shipped by both rail and truck. The company also operates an open pit gypsum mine in the hills north of town. The mine currently in operation is the second to have been located in the area. Its grade is quickly dropping, and the company intends to close and reclaim it soon. A new mine, roughly a mile away, has been permitted, and is currently in the development stage. Unlike most surface mines, which utilize drill and blast methods to recover material, the Eagle mine uses machines similar to pavement mills (Wirtgen 2200 SM Surface Miners) to cut 6-inch-deep (150 mm) swaths through the relatively soft rock. Front-end loaders then sort the material by color (white is gypsum, brown is waste) and load it into trucks to be hauled either to the plant or to waste piles.

== See also ==
- Edwards-Glenwood Springs, CO Combined Statistical Area
- Edwards, CO Micropolitan Statistical Area
