= List of United States tornadoes in May 2018 =

This page documents all tornadoes confirmed by various weather forecast offices of the National Weather Service in the United States in May 2018. Tornado counts are considered preliminary until final publication in the database of the National Centers for Environmental Information.

== United States yearly total ==
Confirmed tornadoes by Enhanced Fujita rating
EFU	EF0	EF1	EF2	EF3	EF4	EF5	Total
15	619	399	76	12	0	0	1,121

== May ==
Confirmed tornadoes by Enhanced Fujita rating
EFU	EF0	EF1	EF2	EF3	EF4	EF5	Total
8	116	40	4	1	0	0	169

=== May 1 event ===
List of confirmed tornadoes – Tuesday, May 1, 2018 (Note: All dates are based on the local time zone where the tornado touched down; however, all times are in Coordinated Universal Time for consistency.)
EF#	Location	County / Parish	State	Start Coord.	Time (UTC)	Path length	Max width
EF0	WNW of Aurora	Hamilton	NE	40.9156°N 98.1455°W	21:35–21:37	0.01 mi (0.016 km)	50 yd (46 m)
EF0	A landspout tornado overturned a center pivot.						
EF0	S of Doniphan	Hall	NE	40.7427°N 98.3604°W	21:50–22:00	1.96 mi (3.15 km)	25 yd (23 m)
EF0	A tornado damaged an outbuilding; debris from the structure caused further damage to a nearby home. Other structures in the area sustained window, soffit, and garage door damage.						
EF0	Chester area	Republic, Thayer	KS, NE	39.9682°N 97.6727°W	22:44–22:54	8.17 mi (13.15 km)	125 yd (114 m)
EF0	Multiple people observed a tornado. No damage occurred.						
EF0	S of Beloit	Mitchell	KS	39.2502°N 98.1469°W	23:09–23:10	0.01 mi (0.016 km)	25 yd (23 m)
EF0	A storm chaser videoed a brief tornado. No damage occurred.						
EF1	NE of Glasco	Cloud	KS	39.4012°N 97.7314°W	23:59–00:20	8.9 mi (14.3 km)	225 yd (206 m)
EF1	Several small outbuildings had their roofs peeled back or were totally destroyed. A house on a farmstead suffered shingle damage, and power poles were downed.						
EF0	N of Ellsworth	Ellsworth	KS	38.836°N 98.2405°W	00:08–00:09	0.35 mi (0.56 km)	50 yd (46 m)
EF0	A tornado briefly touched down over open country. No damage occurred.						
EF0	N of Aurora	Cloud	KS	39.4491°N 97.6107°W	00:15–00:39	7.79 mi (12.54 km)	30 yd (27 m)
EF0	A few softwood trees were snapped or uprooted.						
EF0	WSW of Krider	Gage	NE	40.07°N 96.77°W	00:23–00:25	0.25 mi (0.40 km)	75 yd (69 m)
EF0	A trained storm spotter reported a brief tornado.						
EF3	SSW of Tescott to W of Minneapolis	Saline, Ottawa	KS	38.94°N 97.883°W	00:41–01:10	15.78 mi (25.40 km)	880 yd (800 m)
EF3	A large and intense wedge tornado heavily damaged or destroyed several outbuildings, including a few well-built metal structures. A metal storage trailer was rolled, and another was blown away and not found. A pickup truck was tossed 300 yd (270 m), ground scouring occurred, and a detached garage was swept away. Near the end of the path, a home had its entire roof ripped off and sustained collapse of multiple exterior walls. Another home sustained severe roof and window damage, many trees were snapped or uprooted, and three power poles were snapped. The tornado may have been stronger than EF3 intensity though it struck little structures to indicate a higher intensity.						
EF1	NW of Morganville	Clay	KS	39.494°N 97.348°W	01:49–02:08	8.13 mi (13.08 km)	200 yd (180 m)
EF1	A farmstead, trees, and powerlines were damaged.						
EF1	E of Oak Hill	Clay	KS	39.2474°N 97.3287°W	01:56–02:15	11.89 mi (19.14 km)	50 yd (46 m)
EF1	An outbuilding had its roof panels ripped off, trees were snapped or uprooted, and three power poles were toppled.						

=== May 2 event ===
List of confirmed tornadoes – Wednesday, May 2, 2018
EF#	Location	County / Parish	State	Start Coord.	Time (UTC)	Path length	Max width
EF0	W of Tescott	Ottawa	KS	39.022°N 97.915°W	21:05	0.01 mi (0.016 km)	20 yd (18 m)
EF0	The public reported a brief tornado in an open field.						
EF0	Lake Altus-Lugert	Greer, Kiowa	OK	34.926°N 99.328°W	21:25–21:28	1.7 mi (2.7 km)	30 yd (27 m)
EF0	A number of storm chasers observed a tornado with only minor tree damage.						
EFU	SE of Lone Wolf	Kiowa	OK	34.953°N 99.213°W	21:38–21:40	1.2 mi (1.9 km)	30 yd (27 m)
EFU	A deputy reported a tornado with no known damage.						
EF0	S of McPherson	McPherson	KS	38.2357°N 97.5514°W	21:51–21:58	1.98 mi (3.19 km)	75 yd (69 m)
EF0	A tornado was photographed over open country. No damage occurred.						
EF0	SW of Blue Rapids	Marshall	KS	39.583°N 96.7142°W	22:30–22:33	2.32 mi (3.73 km)	30 yd (27 m)
EF0	A hay barn was destroyed, a home sustained minor shingle and window damage, three poles were blown down, and trees were snapped.						
EFU	NNW of Vernon	Wilbarger	TX	34.2169°N 99.3235°W	22:46	0.2 mi (0.32 km)	25 yd (23 m)
EFU	A storm chaser observed a brief tornado.						
EF0	E of Blue Rapids	Marshall	KS	39.6811°N 96.5196°W	22:47–22:56	7.73 mi (12.44 km)	60 yd (55 m)
EF0	Several small sheds or outbuildings were destroyed. One home sustained damage to its vinyl siding and had its antenna bent, and a second home sustained minor shingle loss. Trees were snapped as well.						
EFU	N of Davidson	Tillman	OK	34.258°N 99.079°W	23:10	0.5 mi (0.80 km)	20 yd (18 m)
EFU	Storm chasers reported a tornado with no known damage.						
EFU	ENE of Davidson	Tillman	OK	34.27°N 98.977°W	23:21–23:22	0.4 mi (0.64 km)	20 yd (18 m)
EFU	Storm chasers reported a tornado with no known damage.						
EF1	E of Davidson	Tillman	OK	34.2311°N 98.9415°W	23:26–23:28	1.6 mi (2.6 km)	50 yd (46 m)
EF1	A home suffered light roof damage and trees were snapped.						
EF1	S of Hollister	Tillman	OK	34.2934°N 98.8763°W	23:34–23:43	5.5 mi (8.9 km)	150 yd (140 m)
EF1	A few outbuildings were damaged and power lines were pushed over.						
EF2	SW of Loveland	Tillman	OK	34.324°N 98.809°W	23:47–23:56	4.1 mi (6.6 km)	600 yd (550 m)
EF2	Several outbuildings were damaged or destroyed, and power poles and trees were snapped.						
EF0	NNW of Cassoday	Butler	KS	38.0536°N 96.6675°W	23:51–23:52	0.83 mi (1.34 km)	75 yd (69 m)
EF0	Law enforcement observed a tornado over an open field. No damage occurred.						
EFU	SSE of Grandfield	Tillman	OK	34.195°N 98.676°W	00:02–00:07	3.5 mi (5.6 km)	50 yd (46 m)
EFU	A reported tornado caused no known damage.						
EF1	ENE of Loveland	Tillman, Cotton	OK	34.329°N 98.689°W	00:07–00:13	3 mi (4.8 km)	250 yd (230 m)
EF1	Power poles were broken.						
EF0	SW of Mound City	Holt	MO	40.0751°N 95.3446°W	00:18–00:22	4.01 mi (6.45 km)	25 yd (23 m)
EF0	A large pole barn was destroyed, docks and boats were damaged, and several camper trailers were overturned.						
EF0	WSW of Hartford	Lyon	KS	38.2829°N 95.998°W	00:45	0.01 mi (0.016 km)	20 yd (18 m)
EF0	Radio media relayed a picture of a possible tornado.						
EF0	WSW of Lebo	Coffey	KS	38.408°N 95.91°W	00:51	0.01 mi (0.016 km)	25 yd (23 m)
EF0	Radio media relayed a picture of a small dust swirl.						
EF1	NW of Rush Springs	Grady	OK	34.753°N 98.056°W	00:55–01:06	10 mi (16 km)	400 yd (370 m)
EF1	An unoccupied mobile home was destroyed. Other homes, outbuildings, and trees were damaged.						
EF1	S of Amber	Grady	OK	35.13°N 97.947°W	00:58–01:06	5.5 mi (8.9 km)	100 yd (91 m)
EF1	A barn, an RV, and power poles were damaged.						
EF0	SSE of Olivet	Osage	KS	38.436°N 95.723°W	01:04	0.01 mi (0.016 km)	25 yd (23 m)
EF0	Emergency management relayed report of a brief tornado.						
EF1	E of Amber	Grady	OK	35.16°N 97.866°W	01:05–01:06	0.4 mi (0.64 km)	25 yd (23 m)
EF1	A carport was destroyed, a roof was damaged, and trees were snapped.						
EF1	Northeastern Norman to W of Lake Thunderbird	Cleveland	OK	35.2516°N 97.4296°W	01:42–01:51	8 mi (13 km)	400 yd (370 m)
EF1	A tornado caused mainly tree damage in Norman and areas to the northeast, though one home lost part of its roof. Outbuildings and fences were damaged, and a metal carport was flipped over as well.						
EF1	Northern Purcell	McClain, Cleveland	OK	34.992°N 97.394°W	01:48–01:53	4.7 mi (7.6 km)	40 yd (37 m)
EF1	Outbuildings were destroyed and large trees were uprooted in the northern part of Purcell.						
EF1	Leawood	Johnson	KS	38.874°N 94.6922°W	02:09–02:17	4.72 mi (7.60 km)	25 yd (23 m)
EF1	Over 100 trees were damaged, 20 windows were blown out at Overland Trail Middle School, and several power poles were snapped.						
EF1	ENE of Macomb	Pottawatomie	OK	35.157°N 96.974°W	02:19–02:20	0.75 mi (1.21 km)	50 yd (46 m)
EF1	A tornado moved through generally unoccupied valley, but damaged one outbuilding.						
EF0	Belton	Cass	MO	38.8111°N 94.5321°W	02:22	0.01 mi (0.016 km)	10 yd (9.1 m)
EF0	Large tree branches were snapped.						
EF0	Southern Raytown	Jackson	MO	38.9688°N 94.4835°W	02:24–02:29	1.61 mi (2.59 km)	25 yd (23 m)
EF0	Trees were uprooted, one of which caused significant damage to a house.						
EF0	Raytown	Jackson	MO	38.9945°N 94.4735°W	02:26–02:29	1.29 mi (2.08 km)	25 yd (23 m)
EF0	Trees were uprooted, some of which fell on homes and caused damage.						
EF0	SSW of Ozona	Val Verde, Crockett	TX	30.2832°N 101.5035°W	03:39–03:44	0.75 mi (1.21 km)	50 yd (46 m)
EF0	A tornado impacted a hunting camp, damaging RVs and power lines while uprooting a few trees. A rating has not yet been assigned.						

=== May 3 event ===
List of confirmed tornadoes – Thursday, May 3, 2018
EF#	Location	County / Parish	State	Start Coord.	Time (UTC)	Path length	Max width
EF1	N of Ozark	Christian	MO	37.0554°N 93.2124°W	07:10–07:13	1.5 mi (2.4 km)	100 yd (91 m)
EF1	Several structures suffered roof damage. Outbuildings were destroyed and trees were snapped.						
EF0	WSW of Rogersville	Greene	MO	37.0921°N 93.1038°W	07:17–07:18	0.29 mi (0.47 km)	50 yd (46 m)
EF0	A barn was destroyed and trees were uprooted.						
EF1	NE of Squires	Douglas	MO	36.8435°N 92.6028°W	07:45–07:47	0.78 mi (1.26 km)	75 yd (69 m)
EF1	An outbuilding was destroyed and trees were snapped or uprooted.						
EF1	W of Byng	Pontotoc	OK	34.848°N 96.759°W	13:22–13:23	0.25 mi (0.40 km)	25 yd (23 m)
EF1	Two vacant mobile homes, one house, and trees were damaged.						
EF1	S of Cecil	Franklin	AR	35.3286°N 94.0039°W	18:09–18:19	9.5 mi (15.3 km)	550 yd (500 m)
EF1	A tornado snapped or uprooted trees, destroyed outbuildings, and damaged chicken houses. A home and nearby barn suffered roof damage.						
EF1	NW of Penn Yan	Yates	NY	42.7139°N 77.1529°W	00:19–00:21	1.11 mi (1.79 km)	100 yd (91 m)
EF1	A barn was collapsed, several trees were downed, and a fence was blown down.						
EF0	SSW of Prairie City	Jasper	IA	41.5479°N 93.2512°W	00:46–00:47	0.43 mi (0.69 km)	25 yd (23 m)
EF0	Trees were damaged.						
EF0	NNE of Percy	Marion	IA	41.4875°N 93.2459°W	00:48–00:50	1.07 mi (1.72 km)	25 yd (23 m)
EF0	Trees were damaged.						
EF0	E of Prairie City	Jasper	IA	41.6012°N 93.1442°W	00:56–00:57	0.39 mi (0.63 km)	25 yd (23 m)
EF0	Trees were damaged.						
EF0	NW of Olin	Jones	IA	42.0012°N 91.1489°W	04:15–04:16	0.01 mi (0.016 km)	10 yd (9.1 m)
EF0	A 150 lb (68 kg) fire hydrant was displaced 15–20 ft (4.6–6.1 m), and a small metal shed was lofted 70 ft (21 m) away.						

=== May 4 event ===
List of confirmed tornadoes – Friday, May 4, 2018
EF#	Location	County / Parish	State	Start Coord.	Time (UTC)	Path length	Max width
EF1	Southeastern Charlestown to Webster	Cheshire, Sullivan, Merrimack	NH	43.1461°N 72.447°W	01:18–01:55	37.55 mi (60.43 km)	300 yd (270 m)
EF1	A weak but long-tracked tornado caused minor to moderate damage along its path, impacting areas in and around Charlestown, Langdon, Lempster, Bradford, Warner and Webster. The most intense damage from this tornado occurred in Warner. This is the second longest-tracked and second earliest tornado on record in New Hampshire going back to 1950.						

=== May 8 event ===
List of confirmed tornadoes – Tuesday, May 8, 2018
EF#	Location	County / Parish	State	Start Coord.	Time (UTC)	Path length	Max width
EF0	NW of Vilas	Miner	SD	44.04°N 97.63°W	01:20–01:21	0.11 mi (0.18 km)	50 yd (46 m)
EF0	A trained storm spotter reported a brief tornado over open fields. No damage occurred.						

=== May 9 event ===
List of confirmed tornadoes – Wednesday, May 9, 2018
EF#	Location	County / Parish	State	Start Coord.	Time (UTC)	Path length	Max width
EF0	N of Fennimore	Grant	WI	43.0307°N 90.6464°W	18:31–18:33	1.55 mi (2.49 km)	70 yd (64 m)
EF0	A machine shed and barn were damaged, windows were blown out of a house, and trees were toppled.						
EF0	S of Richfield	Washington	WI	43.2091°N 88.3449°W	21:50–22:01	5.22 mi (8.40 km)	50 yd (46 m)
EF0	Minor tree and structure damage occurred as a result of this weak tornado.						
EF0	SW of Moore	Judith Basin	MT	46.91°N 109.78°W	23:28–23:33	0.69 mi (1.11 km)	50 yd (46 m)
EF0	Multiple pictures showed a tornado lofting dirt into the air. No damage occurred.						

=== May 11 event ===
List of confirmed tornadoes – Friday, May 11, 2018
EF#	Location	County / Parish	State	Start Coord.	Time (UTC)	Path length	Max width
EF0	SE of Winnemucca	Humboldt	NV	40.84°N 117.34°W	18:05–18:06	0.01 mi (0.016 km)	25 yd (23 m)
EF0	A trained storm spotter reported a brief tornado touchdown.						
EF0	NE of Winnemucca	Humboldt	NV	41.15°N 117.52°W	19:25–19:26	0.01 mi (0.016 km)	15 yd (14 m)
EF0	A trained storm spotter observed a brief tornado cross a dirt road.						

=== May 13 event ===
List of confirmed tornadoes – Sunday, May 13, 2018
EF#	Location	County / Parish	State	Start Coord.	Time (UTC)	Path length	Max width
EF1	Gray	Somerset	PA	40.1377°N 79.1034°W	21:34–21:35	0.54 mi (0.87 km)	100 yd (91 m)
EF1	A tornado inflicted roof or siding damage to several buildings. Numerous trees were snapped or uprooted in Gray, some of which fell on homes. A carport was flipped, and a trailer was moved about 6 ft (1.8 m).						
EF1	N of Kantner	Somerset	PA	40.1164°N 78.9219°W	21:55–21:56	0.29 mi (0.47 km)	100 yd (91 m)
EF1	Dozens of trees were snapped or uprooted.						
EF0	W of Buffalo Mills	Bedford	PA	39.9524°N 78.6731°W	22:19–22:20	0.49 mi (0.79 km)	100 yd (91 m)
EF0	An EF0 tornado knocked down a couple dozen trees in a rural area just south of Brant Hollow Road to the west of Buffalo Mills.						

=== May 14 event ===
List of confirmed tornadoes – Monday, May 14, 2018
EF#	Location	County / Parish	State	Start Coord.	Time (UTC)	Path length	Max width
EF0	NW of The Acreage	Palm Beach	FL	26.7823°N 80.2867°W	09:34–09:38	1.52 mi (2.45 km)	50 yd (46 m)
EF0	A weak tornado caused minor damage to homes and trees.						
EF0	Merritt Island	Brevard	FL	28.3519°N 80.6613°W	14:35–14:36	0.12 mi (0.19 km)	50 yd (46 m)
EF0	A waterspout moved onshore at a mobile home park, causing minor damage.						
EF0	NW of Indiantown	Martin	FL	27.1675°N 80.5853°W	16:25–16:26	0.13 mi (0.21 km)	50 yd (46 m)
EF0	A large tree was uprooted, a screen porch sustained minor damage, and a portion of a metal roof was ripped off a barn.						
EF0	NW of Arkansas City	Cowley	KS	37.1309°N 97.0716°W	23:35–23:37	0.27 mi (0.43 km)	50 yd (46 m)
EF0	Three power poles were downed.						
EF0	NW of Arkansas City	Cowley	KS	37.09°N 97.07°W	23:40–23:41	0.08 mi (0.13 km)	50 yd (46 m)
EF0	Local fire department reported a brief tornado touchdown.						
EF0	Maple City	Cowley	KS	37.0407°N 96.7519°W	02:26–02:35	2.11 mi (3.40 km)	50 yd (46 m)
EF0	Large electrical transmission lines were downed. A tree was uprooted too.						
EF2	E of Maple City	Cowley	KS	37.0601°N 96.7227°W	02:45–02:56	0.8 mi (1.3 km)	75 yd (69 m)
EF2	Three or four heavy power poles were downed, and some trees were damaged.						
EF1	NE of Maple City	Cowley	KS	37.0694°N 96.7103°W	02:48–03:11	4.23 mi (6.81 km)	75 yd (69 m)
EF1	Several large trees and a barn were damaged.						
EF0	NE of Winfield	Cowley	KS	37.2859°N 96.9179°W	02:53–02:55	0.26 mi (0.42 km)	50 yd (46 m)
EF0	Some trees were damaged.						
EF1	NE of Winfield	Cowley	KS	37.2765°N 96.9021°W	02:56–03:04	2.31 mi (3.72 km)	50 yd (46 m)
EF1	Trees were damaged.						
EF0	WSW of Burden	Cowley	KS	37.2894°N 96.8274°W	03:06–03:11	1.64 mi (2.64 km)	50 yd (46 m)
EF0	Sporadic but extensive tree damage was observed.						
EF0	NW of Cedar Vale	Chautauqua	KS	37.1165°N 96.5284°W	03:22–03:24	0.45 mi (0.72 km)	50 yd (46 m)
EF0	Law enforcement reported a tornado over open country.						

=== May 15 event ===
List of confirmed tornadoes – Tuesday, May 15, 2018
EF#	Location	County / Parish	State	Start Coord.	Time (UTC)	Path length	Max width
EF1	E of Saugerties to Tivoli	Ulster, Dutchess	NY	42.0814°N 74.0019°W	18:29–18:35	4.26 mi (6.86 km)	175 yd (160 m)
EF1	Trees were downed along the path, some of which landed on homes, vehicles, and power lines.						
EF1	E of Waymart	Wayne	PA	41.5898°N 75.3719°W	19:05–19:06	0.22 mi (0.35 km)	25 yd (23 m)
EF1	Several trees were snapped or uprooted. Homes sustained minor damage to their roofs, as well as loss of gutters and mesh screening for porches.						
EF1	Northeastern Winsted	Litchfield	CT	41.9298°N 73.065°W	19:44–19:46	0.68 mi (1.09 km)	175 yd (160 m)
EF1	A tornado uprooted and sheared off trees, and damaged homes and power lines in the northeastern part of Winsted.						
EFU	Barkhamsted Reservoir	Litchfield	CT	41.9296°N 72.9576°W	19:52–19:53	0.39 mi (0.63 km)	100 yd (91 m)
EFU	A waterspout formed over Barkhamsted Reservoir but caused no damage.						
EF1	Enola	Cumberland	PA	40.3119°N 76.948°W	20:15–20:16	0.08 mi (0.13 km)	40 yd (37 m)
EF1	A shed was destroyed, a house and a vehicle sustained minor damage, and a few dozen trees were toppled.						
EF0	Newburgh	Orange	NY	41.5359°N 74.0123°W	20:16–20:17	0.64 mi (1.03 km)	50 yd (46 m)
EF0	1 death – A brief tornado moved through the Balmville neighborhood in Newburgh. Several trees were sheared off or were uprooted. One tree fell on a moving vehicle, killing a person inside.						
EF2	Kent	Putnam	NY	41.4996°N 73.6847°W	20:29–20:30	1.18 mi (1.90 km)	100 yd (91 m)
EF2	A low-end EF2 tornado struck Kent, damaging a Dunkin' Donuts and the roof of a strip mall. The most intense damage occurred in a wooded area near the end of the path, where numerous large trees were snapped or uprooted in a convergent pattern.						
EF1	Patterson	Putnam	NY	41.4929°N 73.5854°W	20:32–20:34	2.92 mi (4.70 km)	75 yd (69 m)
EF1	Multiple trees were snapped and uprooted along an intermittent path through Patterson.						
EF1	Southbury to Oxford	New Haven	CT	41.4664°N 73.1691°W	20:53–21:01	3.67 mi (5.91 km)	400 yd (370 m)
EF1	Numerous trees were snapped or uprooted, and the roof of a school in Oxford was damaged.						
EF1	Eastern Beacon Falls to W of Sleeping Giant State Park	New Haven	CT	41.4385°N 73.0466°W	21:01–21:08	7.36 mi (11.84 km)	600 yd (550 m)
EF1	This tornado touched down in Beacon Falls before it dissipated within a larger area of damaging straight-line winds near Sleeping Giant State Park. A barn was destroyed and numerous trees were snapped or uprooted along the path.						
EF0	E of Palmer	Christian	IL	39.4581°N 89.3357°W	21:37–21:44	1.84 mi (2.96 km)	25 yd (23 m)
EF0	Emergency management reported a tornado. No damage occurred.						
EF0	SSE of Pearl	Greene, Pike	IL	39.4191°N 90.603°W	23:21–23:23	0.86 mi (1.38 km)	50 yd (46 m)
EF0	A landspout tornado was widely documented. No damage occurred.						

=== May 16 event ===
List of confirmed tornadoes – Wednesday, May 16, 2018
EF#	Location	County / Parish	State	Start Coord.	Time (UTC)	Path length	Max width
EF0	WNW of Qulin	Butler	MO	36.6351°N 90.337°W	00:00–00:15	5.9 mi (9.5 km)	50 yd (46 m)
EF0	A door was ripped off a shop building and brought down an electrical service wire before landing on an adjacent side of the building. Small tree limbs were snapped as well.						

=== May 17 event ===
List of confirmed tornadoes – Thursday, May 17, 2018
EF#	Location	County / Parish	State	Start Coord.	Time (UTC)	Path length	Max width
EF0	SSE of Monette	Craighead	AR	35.8744°N 90.3514°W	18:32–18:35	0.85 mi (1.37 km)	50 yd (46 m)
EF0	Trained storm spotters observed a weak tornado in a field. No damage occurred.						

=== May 18 event ===
List of confirmed tornadoes – Friday, May 18, 2018
EF#	Location	County / Parish	State	Start Coord.	Time (UTC)	Path length	Max width
EF0	SW of Estes Park	Larimer	CO	40.3134°N 105.6482°W	20:39–20:40	0.01 mi (0.016 km)	25 yd (23 m)
EF0	A brief tornado touched down but caused no damage.						
EF0	E of Friend	Finney	KS	38.25°N 100.79°W	00:25–00:29	0.72 mi (1.16 km)	50 yd (46 m)
EF0	A storm chaser reported a tornado that caused no damage.						
EF0	S of Tasco	Sheridan	KS	39.1744°N 100.3019°W	00:36–00:37	0.01 mi (0.016 km)	25 yd (23 m)
EF0	A storm chaser reported a brief tornado.						
EF0	NE of Syracuse	Hamilton	KS	38.0601°N 101.5904°W	01:55–02:02	0.91 mi (1.46 km)	50 yd (46 m)
EF0	This was the first of three landspout tornadoes in close proximity as reported by a storm chaser. No damage occurred.						
EF0	NNE of Syracuse	Hamilton	KS	38.1406°N 101.6197°W	02:17–02:22	0.73 mi (1.17 km)	50 yd (46 m)
EF0	This was the second of three landspout tornadoes in close proximity as reported by a storm chaser. No damage occurred.						
EF0	NNE of Syracuse	Hamilton	KS	38.23°N 101.58°W	02:25–02:29	0.47 mi (0.76 km)	50 yd (46 m)
EF0	This was the final of three landspout tornadoes in close proximity as reported by a storm chaser. No damage occurred.						

=== May 19 event ===
List of confirmed tornadoes – Saturday, May 19, 2018
EF#	Location	County / Parish	State	Start Coord.	Time (UTC)	Path length	Max width
EF0	W of Pawhuska	Osage	OK	36.6375°N 96.5922°W	19:59–20:01	1.9 mi (3.1 km)	100 yd (91 m)
EF0	A barn suffered some roof damage, and large tree limbs were snapped.						
EF1	N of Pleasant Hope	Polk	MO	37.4785°N 93.3062°W	23:25–23:29	2.3 mi (3.7 km)	100 yd (91 m)
EF1	Several outbuildings were damaged. A home sustained damage to its roof. Numerous trees were snapped or uprooted.						
EF1	N of Pleasant Hope	Polk	MO	37.5025°N 93.2799°W	23:28–23:29	2 mi (3.2 km)	100 yd (91 m)
EF1	Two barns were destroyed while a third suffered roof damage. Numerous trees were uprooted.						
EF1	SW of Bedford	Bedford	VA	37.2779°N 79.5621°W	01:36–01:38	1 mi (1.6 km)	100 yd (91 m)
EF1	About 50 trees were damaged, snapped, or uprooted.						

=== May 20 event ===
List of confirmed tornadoes – Sunday, May 20, 2018
EF#	Location	County / Parish	State	Start Coord.	Time (UTC)	Path length	Max width
EF0	NW of Wayne	McClain	OK	34.885°N 97.423°W	05:17–05:22	7 mi (11 km)	50 yd (46 m)
EF0	Four outbuildings, the roof of one home, and trees were damaged.						
EF1	Northern Leander	Williamson	TX	30.5905°N 97.8241°W	13:22–13:43	5.12 mi (8.24 km)	50 yd (46 m)
EF1	Several houses sustained roof damage in the northern part of Leander. Tree damage occurred as well.						

=== May 21 event ===
List of confirmed tornadoes – Monday, May 21, 2018
EF#	Location	County / Parish	State	Start Coord.	Time (UTC)	Path length	Max width
EF0	Bandelier National Monument	Sandoval	NM	35.69°N 106.3°W	23:15–23:16	3.84 mi (6.18 km)	20 yd (18 m)
EF0	A trained storm spotter observed a brief tornado.						
EF0	WSW of Agate	Elbert	CO	39.4°N 104.17°W	23:15–23:16	0.01 mi (0.016 km)	50 yd (46 m)
EF0	A tornado briefly touched down in an open field. No damage occurred.						
EF0	E of Cedarvale	Torrance	NM	34.38°N 105.64°W	01:50–01:51	0.28 mi (0.45 km)	20 yd (18 m)
EF0	Storm chasers reported a brief landspout tornado.						
EF0	E of Socorro	Lincoln	NM	34.11°N 105.52°W	02:07–02:10	2.39 mi (3.85 km)	50 yd (46 m)
EF0	Trained storm spotters reported a tornado.						
EF0	N of Mount Orab	Brown	OH	39.053°N 83.9283°W	02:04–02:07	1.85 mi (2.98 km)	75 yd (69 m)
EF0	Numerous trees were snapped or uprooted. A residence sustained minor roof damage and had its chimney blown off.						

=== May 22 event ===
List of confirmed tornadoes – Tuesday, May 22, 2018
EF#	Location	County / Parish	State	Start Coord.	Time (UTC)	Path length	Max width
EF0	SSE of Mountain City	Elko	NV	41.73°N 115.92°W	20:00–20:01	0.01 mi (0.016 km)	10 yd (9.1 m)
EF0	The public recorded a high elevation tornado. No damage occurred.						

=== May 23 event ===
List of confirmed tornadoes – Wednesday, May 23, 2018
EF#	Location	County / Parish	State	Start Coord.	Time (UTC)	Path length	Max width
EFU	SW of Picacho	Lincoln	NM	47.14°N 104.89°W	20:10–20:25	2.22 mi (3.57 km)	400 yd (370 m)
EFU	Storm chasers observed a large wedge tornado.						
EF0	S of Picacho	Lincoln	NM	33.16°N 105.24°W	21:06–21:20	4.05 mi (6.52 km)	200 yd (180 m)
EF0	Storm chasers observed a tornado.						
EF0	NW of Glendive	Dawson	MT	47.14°N 104.89°W	01:42–01:43	0.28 mi (0.45 km)	10 yd (9.1 m)
EF0	A brief rope tornado was photographed by an NWS employee. No damage occurred.						

=== May 24 event ===
List of confirmed tornadoes – Thursday, May 24, 2018
EF#	Location	County / Parish	State	Start Coord.	Time (UTC)	Path length	Max width
EF0	NW of Screven	Wayne	GA	31.52°N 82.05°W	22:15	0.1 mi (0.16 km)	20 yd (18 m)
EF0	A couple of homes sustained minor damage as a result of this weak tornado.						

=== May 25 event ===
List of confirmed tornadoes – Friday, May 25, 2018
EF#	Location	County / Parish	State	Start Coord.	Time (UTC)	Path length	Max width
EF0	ENE of Minnesota Lake	Faribault	MN	43.8444°N 93.7624°W	19:40–19:43	0.41 mi (0.66 km)	20 yd (18 m)
EF0	A landspout tornado briefly touched down. No damage occurred.						
EF0	SE of Bartlett	Wheeler	NE	41.76°N 98.39°W	22:30–22:45	0.85 mi (1.37 km)	10 yd (9.1 m)
EF0	Photos and video verified a landspout tornado. No damage occurred.						
EF0	W of Akron	Boone	NE	41.73°N 98.27°W	22:36–22:40	0.1 mi (0.16 km)	50 yd (46 m)
EF0	Nebraska State Patrol reported a landspout tornado.						
EF0	ESE of Sweetwater	Beckham	OK	35.398°N 99.815°W	00:26	0.05 mi (0.080 km)	10 yd (9.1 m)
EF0	A storm chaser observed a landspout tornado.						

=== May 27 event ===
Florida event was associated with Tropical Storm Alberto.

List of confirmed tornadoes – Sunday, May 27, 2018
EF#	Location	County / Parish	State	Start Coord.	Time (UTC)	Path length	Max width
EF0	ESE of Palm City	Martin	FL	27.1393°N 80.1901°W	20:04–20:05	0.05 mi (0.080 km)	10 yd (9.1 m)
EF0	A tornado damaged power lines, railroad signals, and trees.						
EF0	E of Neoga	Cumberland	IL	39.3302°N 88.395°W	21:30–21:36	0.81 mi (1.30 km)	25 yd (23 m)
EF0	Law enforcement reported a landspout tornado. No damage occurred.						
EF2	E of Federal	Laramie	WY	41.2747°N 105.1089°W	21:20–21:32	1 mi (1.6 km)	500 yd (460 m)
EF2	A large cone tornado caused high-end EF2 damage, tearing the roof and a few exterior walls from a frame home. Another house had its roof torn off, a manufactured home lost it roof and garage. Numerous livestock and camper trailers were tossed, sheds and garages were destroyed, and multiple other homes sustained roof damage.						
EFU	NNW of Cheyenne	Laramie	WY	41.40073°N 104.88017°W	22:21–22:23	0.64 mi (1.03 km)	100 yd (91 m)
EFU	A tornado crossed Interstate 25 near the Whitaker exit, damaging a car.						
EF0	NNE of Burlington	Kit Carson	CO	39.4599°N 102.1996°W	23:43–23:47	1.54 mi (2.48 km)	200 yd (180 m)
EF0	Two storm chasers reported a tornado. No damage occurred.						
EF0	ENE of Beaver City	Newton	IN	40.9111°N 87.3446°W	23:58–23:59	0.1 mi (0.16 km)	25 yd (23 m)
EF0	A brief landspout tornado occurred over open field. No damage occurred.						

=== May 28 event ===
South Carolina event was associated with Tropical Storm Alberto.

List of confirmed tornadoes – Monday, May 28, 2018
EF#	Location	County / Parish	State	Start Coord.	Time (UTC)	Path length	Max width
EF0	E of Cameron	Calhoun	SC	33.5494°N 80.6966°W	19:06–19:07	0.29 mi (0.47 km)	150 yd (140 m)
EF0	A community center roof and garage door were damaged, a roof was torn off a baseball dugout, and metal roofing was ripped from a church. Fencing, signs, and trees were damaged.						
EF0	Strawberry Reservoir	Wasatch	UT	40.1438°N 111.1321°W	19:10–19:12	0.28 mi (0.45 km)	5 yd (4.6 m)
EF0	A highly visible tornado passed over the Strawberry Reservoir. No damage occurred, and the tornado was caught on video and photographed by many people.						
EF0	NNE of Rand	Jackson	CO	40.5266°N 106.1398°W	19:15–19:25	0.1 mi (0.16 km)	50 yd (46 m)
EF0	Trained storm spotters observed a tornado over open country. No damage occurred.						
EF0	S of Hill City	Graham	KS	39.1907°N 99.8292°W	19:19–19:27	4.48 mi (7.21 km)	100 yd (91 m)
EF0	A trained storm spotter reported a tornado. No damage occurred.						
EF0	SE of Plover	Pocahontas	IA	42.8511°N 94.5836°W	19:20–19:22	0.87 mi (1.40 km)	30 yd (27 m)
EF0	A brief landspout tornado kicked up dirt in a field. No damage occurred.						
EF0	ESE of South Pass	Fremont	WY	42.3367°N 108.7514°W	21:00–21:01	0.49 mi (0.79 km)	20 yd (18 m)
EF0	The public reported a brief tornado that remained over open country.						
EF0	Snowville	Box Elder	UT	41.9697°N 112.714°W	21:15–21:17	0.1 mi (0.16 km)	5 yd (4.6 m)
EF0	The public observed a brief tornado. No damage occurred.						
EF0	NE of Granger	Sweetwater	WY	41.5959°N 109.9419°W	21:39–21:43	3.45 mi (5.55 km)	25 yd (23 m)
EF0	The public observed a tornado that remained over open country.						
EF0	N of Flagler	Kit Carson	CO	39.5529°N 103.0966°W	22:19–22:27	0.01 mi (0.016 km)	100 yd (91 m)
EF0	An NWS employee reported a tornado.						
EF0	E of Thurman	Washington	CO	39.58°N 103.08°W	22:22–22:30	0.01 mi (0.016 km)	50 yd (46 m)
EF0	Multiple chasers reported a tornado with no damage.						
EF0	N of Flagler	Kit Carson	CO	39.5259°N 103.0154°W	23:00–23:04	1.29 mi (2.08 km)	150 yd (140 m)
EF0	An NWS employee reported a tornado.						
EF0	SE of Anton	Washington	CO	39.69°N 103.03°W	23:00–23:03	0.01 mi (0.016 km)	50 yd (46 m)
EF0	Storm chasers observed two tornadoes in close proximity. Crop damage likely occurred.						
EF0	SE of Anton	Washington	CO	39.65°N 103.08°W	23:00–23:07	0.01 mi (0.016 km)	50 yd (46 m)
EF0	Storm chasers observed two tornadoes in close proximity. Crop damage likely occurred.						
EF0	SSE of Goodrich	Morgan	CO	40.29°N 104.04°W	23:10–23:15	0.01 mi (0.016 km)	50 yd (46 m)
EF0	Crops sustained minor damage.						
EF0	WSW of Cope	Kit Carson	CO	39.5378°N 102.9588°W	23:10–23:21	1.84 mi (2.96 km)	150 yd (140 m)
EF0	This was one of two tornadoes ongoing at the same time.						
EF0	WSW of Cope	Kit Carson	CO	39.5198°N 102.9918°W	23:10–23:32	2.59 mi (4.17 km)	200 yd (180 m)
EF0	This was the second of two tornadoes ongoing at the same time. An irrigation pivot was damaged.						
EF0	WSW of Cope	Kit Carson	CO	39.65°N 102.92°W	23:11–23:27	0.1 mi (0.16 km)	50 yd (46 m)
EF0	This was one of three tornadoes that formed in close proximity to one another. No damage occurred.						
EF0	WSW of Cope	Washington	CO	39.62°N 103.07°W	23:15–23:39	3.5 mi (5.6 km)	50 yd (46 m)
EF0	This was the second of three tornadoes that formed in close proximity to one another. No damage occurred.						
EF0	WSW of Cope	Washington	CO	39.65°N 102.92°W	23:23–23:39	0.01 mi (0.016 km)	50 yd (46 m)
EF0	This was the final of three tornadoes that formed in close proximity to one another. No damage occurred.						
EF0	NNW of Seibert	Kit Carson	CO	39.4553°N 102.9712°W	23:26–23:28	0.01 mi (0.016 km)	150 yd (140 m)
EF0	An NWS employee reported a tornado from a long distance away.						
EF0	ENE of Thurman	Washington	CO	39.6°N 103.05°W	23:29–23:32	0.01 mi (0.016 km)	50 yd (46 m)
EF0	A trained storm spotter reported a tornado. No damage occurred.						
EF0	S of Grover	Weld	CO	40.77°N 104.23°W	23:34–23:35	0.01 mi (0.016 km)	50 yd (46 m)
EF0	Several power lines were downed by this tornado.						
EF0	N of Vona	Kit Carson	CO	39.4726°N 102.7293°W	23:35–23:36	0.01 mi (0.016 km)	100 yd (91 m)
EF0	An NWS employee observed a brief tornado						
EF0	S of Keota	Weld	CO	40.62°N 104.07°W	23:37–23:38	0.01 mi (0.016 km)	50 yd (46 m)
EF0	Several power lines were downed by this tornado.						
EF1	Southeastern Cope	Washington	CO	39.66°N 102.85°W	23:42–23:45	0.01 mi (0.016 km)	50 yd (46 m)
EF1	A brief tornado moved through the southeastern part of Cope, severely damaging a carport and a garage. Debris was scattered and a pine tree was uprooted as well.						
EF0	SSE of Goodrich	Morgan	CO	40.29°N 104.04°W	00:24–00:29	0.01 mi (0.016 km)	50 yd (46 m)
EF0	Minor crop and property damage was observed.						
EF0	E of Fort Morgan	Morgan	CO	40.32°N 103.73°W	00:32–00:37	0.01 mi (0.016 km)	50 yd (46 m)
EF0	The fire department reported a tornado. No damage occurred.						
EF0	S of Goodwell	Texas	OK	36.542°N 101.638°W	00:41–00:42	0.26 mi (0.42 km)	50 yd (46 m)
EF0	A barn was collapsed by this tornado.						
EF1	W of Hardesty	Texas	OK	36.622°N 101.272°W	01:21–01:24	2.02 mi (3.25 km)	200 yd (180 m)
EF1	A main double transmission line and four smaller power poles were snapped. Fencing, a carport, a large storage container, and trees were damaged. The storage container and a watering trough were pushed 10–30 ft (3.0–9.1 m).						

=== May 29 event ===
List of confirmed tornadoes – Tuesday, May 29, 2018
EF#	Location	County / Parish	State	Start Coord.	Time (UTC)	Path length	Max width
EF0	NE of Ames	Story	IA	42.0533°N 93.5533°W	20:58–21:01	0.3 mi (0.48 km)	30 yd (27 m)
EF0	A member of the public recorded a landspout tornado.						
EF0	N of Ensign	Gray, Ford	KS	37.6719°N 100.2833°W	21:44–21:54	4.11 mi (6.61 km)	100 yd (91 m)
EF0	A likely intense stovepipe tornado remained over open farm fields, avoiding structures along its path. However, muddy farm fields were scoured out to a depth of 8 in (20 cm) in some areas. Crop debris was deposited in power lines as well.						
EF0	W of Mobeetie	Gray	TX	35.5°N 100.57°W	22:36–22:37	0.1 mi (0.16 km)	50 yd (46 m)
EF0	A storm chaser observed a brief tornado in an open field. No damage occurred.						
EF0	S of Mobeetie	Wheeler	TX	35.48°N 100.43°W	23:09–23:10	0.1 mi (0.16 km)	50 yd (46 m)
EF0	A skycam and chaser reports confirmed a tornado over open country.						
EF0	NW of Leisure City	Miami-Dade	FL	25.4915°N 80.4501°W	00:00–00:03	0.33 mi (0.53 km)	25 yd (23 m)
EF0	A residence sustained minor property and tree damage. A car rental facility suffered minor damage to its metal carport.						
EF1	SSE of Waynoka	Woods	OK	36.5852°N 98.8789°W	00:25–00:31	2.5 mi (4.0 km)	20 yd (18 m)
EF1	A historic hotel in Waynoka had its roof ripped off. A few trees and many limbs were downed.						
EF0	Belleville	Republic	KS	39.82°N 97.6273°W	01:12–01:14	0.3 mi (0.48 km)	30 yd (27 m)
EF0	Tree limbs were downed.						

=== May 30 event ===
List of confirmed tornadoes – Wednesday, May 30, 2018
EF#	Location	County / Parish	State	Start Coord.	Time (UTC)	Path length	Max width
EF0	SW of Joshua	De Soto	FL	27.1902°N 81.7471°W	13:01–13:03	0.78 mi (1.26 km)	50 yd (46 m)
EF0	A barn was destroyed.						
EF0	ESE of Bordulac	Foster	ND	47.3826°N 98.9408°W	17:15–17:30	0.89 mi (1.43 km)	50 yd (46 m)
EF0	The public reported a persistent landspout tornado. No damage occurred.						
EF0	N of Marseilles	LaSalle	IL	41.3802°N 88.6832°W	00:30–00:50	0.9 mi (1.4 km)	30 yd (27 m)
EF0	A storm chaser videoed a landspout tornado. No damage occurred.						
EF0	SSW of Bristol	Fillmore	MN	43.5129°N 92.2036°W	00:40–00:43	0.46 mi (0.74 km)	8 yd (7.3 m)
EF0	A shed was damaged.						
EF0	W of Troy	Miami	OH	40.0393°N 84.3038°W	00:46–00:48	0.1 mi (0.16 km)	30 yd (27 m)
EF0	A weak and brief tornado destroyed an outbuilding and damaged several trees.						

=== May 31 event ===
List of confirmed tornadoes – Thursday, May 31, 2018
EF#	Location	County / Parish	State	Start Coord.	Time (UTC)	Path length	Max width
EF0	SE of Manning	Dunn	ND	47.11°N 102.62°W	19:43–19:46	0.32 mi (0.51 km)	50 yd (46 m)
EF0	A trained storm spotter reported a tornado. No damage occurred.						
EF1	Idaho National Laboratory	Bingham	ID	43.4709°N 112.7636°W	22:00–22:30	12 mi (19 km)	25 yd (23 m)
EF1	Two snow fences were heavily damaged, with multiple steel posts twisted. Vinyl and steel cables attached to the fences were ripped apart. Large metal pieces used to hold the cables together were snapped or thrown. A sign was toppled to the ground, sagebrush was partially or completely torn from the ground, and several small lava rocks were tossed.						
EF0	S of Richardton	Stark	ND	46.8122°N 102.3243°W	22:19–22:24	0.42 mi (0.68 km)	50 yd (46 m)
EF0	A storm chaser reported a tornado that caused no damage.						
EF0	S of Monteview	Jefferson	ID	43.6695°N 112.53°W	22:31–22:36	3 mi (4.8 km)	10 yd (9.1 m)
EF0	A trained storm spotter observed a rope tornado.						
EF0	N of Glen Ullin	Morton	ND	46.9358°N 101.83°W	23:15–23:17	0.25 mi (0.40 km)	50 yd (46 m)
EF0	A storm chaser reported a tornado that caused no damage.						
EF1	E of Fruitland	Cape Girardeau	MO	37.453°N 89.5378°W	00:44–00:49	2.21 mi (3.56 km)	150 yd (140 m)
EF1	Dozens of trees were snapped or uprooted. Several power poles were snapped from fallen trees.						
EF1	S of Wolf Lake	Union	IL	37.481°N 89.4697°W	00:54–01:02	3.11 mi (5.01 km)	150 yd (140 m)
EF1	One barn was destroyed while a second, large equipment barn was collapsed. A one-story home was partially shifted off its foundation and had a window broken. Dozens of trees were damaged.						
EF0	S of Wolf Lake	Union	IL	37.4662°N 89.456°W	00:55–00:59	1.12 mi (1.80 km)	50 yd (46 m)
EF0	The roof of a barn was collapsed on one side. Several tree limbs were broken.						

== See also ==
- Tornadoes of 2018
- List of United States tornadoes in April 2018
- List of United States tornadoes from June to July 2018
