= Colorado State Highway 57 =

State highway in La Plata County, Colorado, U.S.

State Highway 57
- Colorado Avenue

Route information
- Maintained by Colorado Department of Transportation
- Length: 0.534 mi (859 m)
- Existed: c. 1920s–present

Major junctions
- South end: I-70 south of Stratton
- North end: US 24 in Stratton

Location
- Country: United States
- State: Colorado
- Counties: Kit Carson

Highway system
- Colorado State Highway System; Interstate; US; State; Scenic
← SH 56	→ SH 58

State Highway 57 (SH 57) is a short, 0.534-mile (0.859 km) state highway in Kit Carson County, Colorado, United States, that connects Interstate 70 (I‑70), south of Stratton with U.S. Route 24 (US 24) in Stratton.

== Route description ==
SH 57 begins at a diamond interchange with I‑70 (I‑70 Exit 419) just south of Stratton. I‑70 heads west toward Vona, Limon, and Denver and east toward Bethune, Burlington, and eventually, Hays, Kansas. County Road 30.5 heads very briefly south before ending shortly after a connection with the north end of County Road 31 [CR 31]--the former routing of SR 57.) From its southern terminus, SH 57 heads northward for about 0.2 miles (0.32 km) before the city limits of Stratton. SH 57 quickly crosses Claremont Street/Seventh Street, followed by Sixth and Fifth streets, before reaching an intersection with US 24 (Fourth Street), its northern terminus. (US 24 heads east toward Bethune and Burlington and west toward Vona, Seibert, and Limon. Colorado Avenue continues north to CR 30.5.)

The route is entirely unsigned; there are no signs designating the route as SH 57. However, the Colorado Department of Transportation (CDOT) still recognizes it as a state highway and maintains it as needed.

== Traffic ==
As of 2021, approximately 2000 cars used the route daily.

== History ==
The route was established in the 1920s. At the time of its establishment, the route was far longer than it is today, extending nearly 25 miles (40 km). It began at US 24 in Stratton and headed north to Kirk and on to U.S. Route 36. In 1939, SH 57 was extended south for 8-mile (13 km); however, most of this extension was removed in 1954, leaving only 9 miles (14 km) around Stratton. This entire remaining length was paved by 1956. The highway was linked to I‑70 in 1966 when the Interstate Highway System was built, and the 8-mile (13 km) stretch north of US 24 was removed from the numbered route in 1992, leaving the approximately one-half-mile (0.80 km) routing seen today.

== Major intersections ==
The entire route is in Kit Carson County.

Location	mi	km	Destinations	Notes
	0.000	0.000	CR 30.5 – CR 31	Continuation south beyond southern terminus; SH 57 previously continued south along what is now CR 31
	0.000	0.000	I-70 west (Dwight D. Eisenhower Highway) – Vona, Limon, Denver I-70 east (Dwight D. Eisenhower Highway) – Bethune, Burlington, Hays (Kansas)	Southern terminus; Diamond interchange, I-70 Exit 419
Stratton	0.534	0.859	US 24 east (4th Street) – Bethune, Burlington US 24 west (4th Street) – Vona, Seibert, Limon	Northern terminus; SH 57 previously continued briefly east (concurrent with US 24), before heading north to Kirk and US 36
Stratton	0.534	0.859	Colorado Avenue north – CR 30.5	Continuation north beyond northern terminus
1.000 mi = 1.609 km; 1.000 km = 0.621 mi

== See also ==
- List of state highways in Colorado
