= KNAB =

KNAB or Knab may refer to:

- KNAB (AM), radio station (1140 AM) licensed to Burlington, Colorado, United States
- KNAB-FM, radio station (104.1 FM) licensed to Burlington, Colorado, United States
- Corruption Prevention and Combating Bureau in Latvia
- Kohanimeandmebaas, the database of place names maintained by the Institute of the Estonian Language, and its accompanying transliteration system
- Knab, Dutch bank operated by Aegon
- Knab (surname)
