= Burlington School District RE-6J =

School district in Colorado, United States

Address
- 2600 Rose Avenue Burlington, Colorado, 80807; United States
- Coordinates: 39°18′6″N 102°17′1″W

District information
- Type: Unified school district
- Grades: PK–12
- Superintendent: Shane Walkinshaw
- Business administrator: Rina Barkhuizen
- School board: 7 members
- Chair of the board: Darrenn Bennett
- Schools: 3
- Budget: $9,655,000
- NCES District ID: 0802670

Students and staff
- Students: 768
- Teachers: 45.69 (on an FTE basis)
- Staff: 101.20 (on an FTE basis)
- Student–teacher ratio: 16.81
- District mascot: Cougar
- Colors: Red and black

Other information
- Website: burlingtonk12.org

Burlington School District RE-6J is a public school district in Kit Carson County, Colorado, United States, based in Burlington, Colorado.

== Schools ==
Burlington School District RE-6J has one elementary school, one middle school and one high school.

=== Elementary schools ===
- Burlington Elementary School

=== Middle schools ===
- Burlington Middle School

=== High school ===
- Burlington High School
