= Vona, Colorado =

Town in Kit Carson County, Colorado, United States

- Town
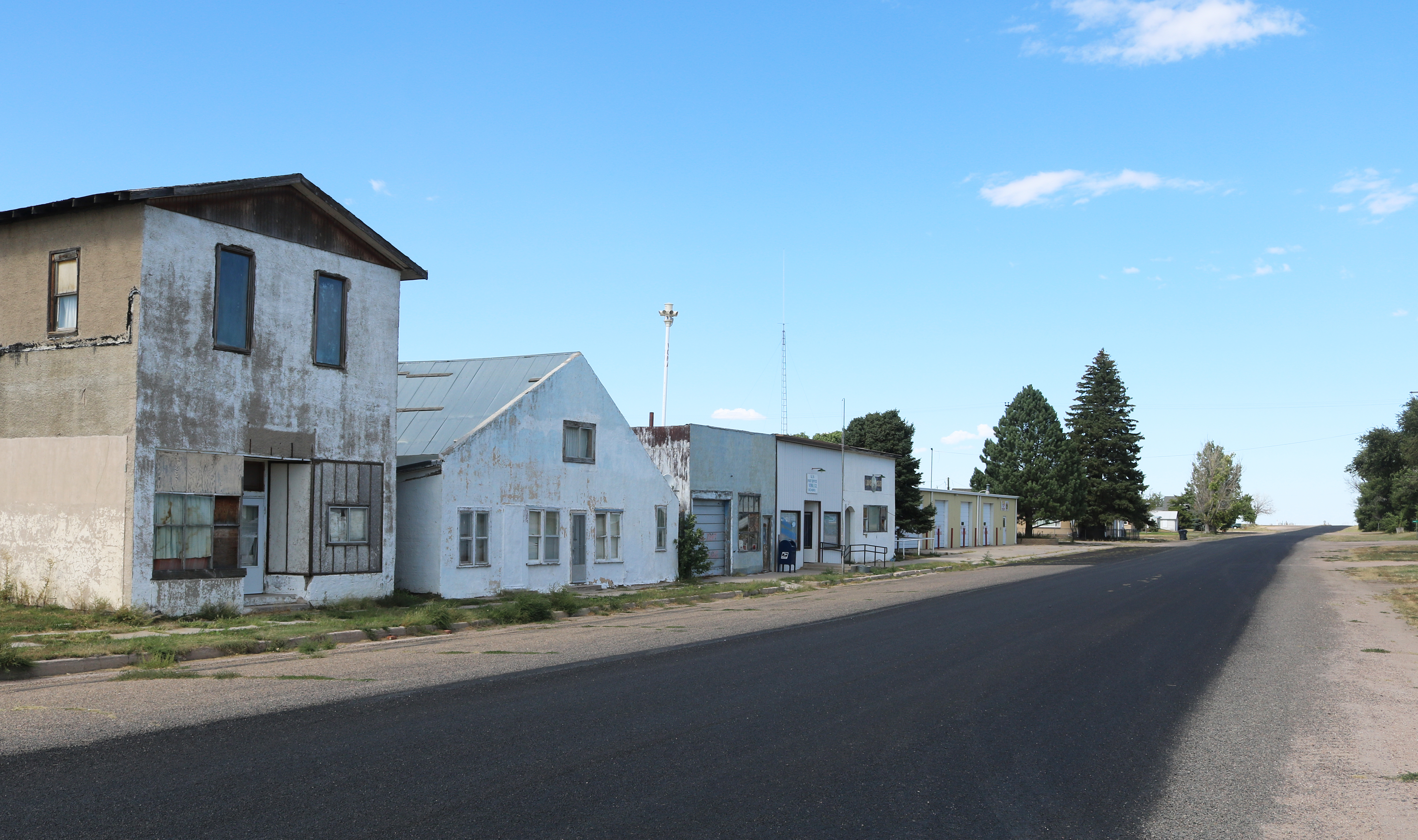
- 1st Avenue (2019)

- Location within Kit Carson County and Colorado
- Coordinates: 39°18′08″N 102°44′36″W
- Country: United States
- State: Colorado
- County: Kit Carson
- Incorporated: August 9, 1919

Government
  - Type: Statutory Town

Area
  - Total: 0.22 sq mi (0.57 km^{2})
  - Land: 0.22 sq mi (0.57 km^{2})
  - Water: 0 sq mi (0.00 km^{2})
- Elevation: 4,505 ft (1,373 m)

Population (2020)
  - Total: 95
  - Density: 430/sq mi (170/km^{2})
- Time zone: UTC−7 (MST)
  - Summer (DST): UTC−6 (MDT)
- ZIP Code: 80861
- Area code: 719, 970
- FIPS code: 08-81690
- GNIS ID: 2413437

Vona is a statutory town in Kit Carson County, Colorado, United States. The population was 95 at the 2020 census.

== History ==
Vona was named after Vona, the niece of an attorney from Burlington by the name of Pearl S. King. In 1936, a fire destroyed half of Vona's business district.

== Geography ==
Vona is located at 39°18′10″N 102°44′39″W.

According to the United States Census Bureau, the town has a total area of 0.2 square miles (0.52 km^{2}), all of it land.

== Demographics ==
Historical population
Census	Pop.	Note	%±
1920	268		—
1930	183		−31.7%
1940	226		23.5%
1950	209		−7.5%
1960	130		−37.8%
1970	114		−12.3%
1980	94		−17.5%
1990	104		10.6%
2000	95		−8.7%
2010	106		11.6%
2020	95		−10.4%
U.S. Decennial Census

== Transportation ==
Interstate 70 passes just south of Vona. The Vona exit from I-70 is exit 412. U.S. Highway 24 runs just north of the interstate, from Seibert through Vona, Stratton and Bethune to Burlington.

== See also ==
- List of municipalities in Colorado
