= Burlington State Armory =

- U.S. National Register of Historic Places
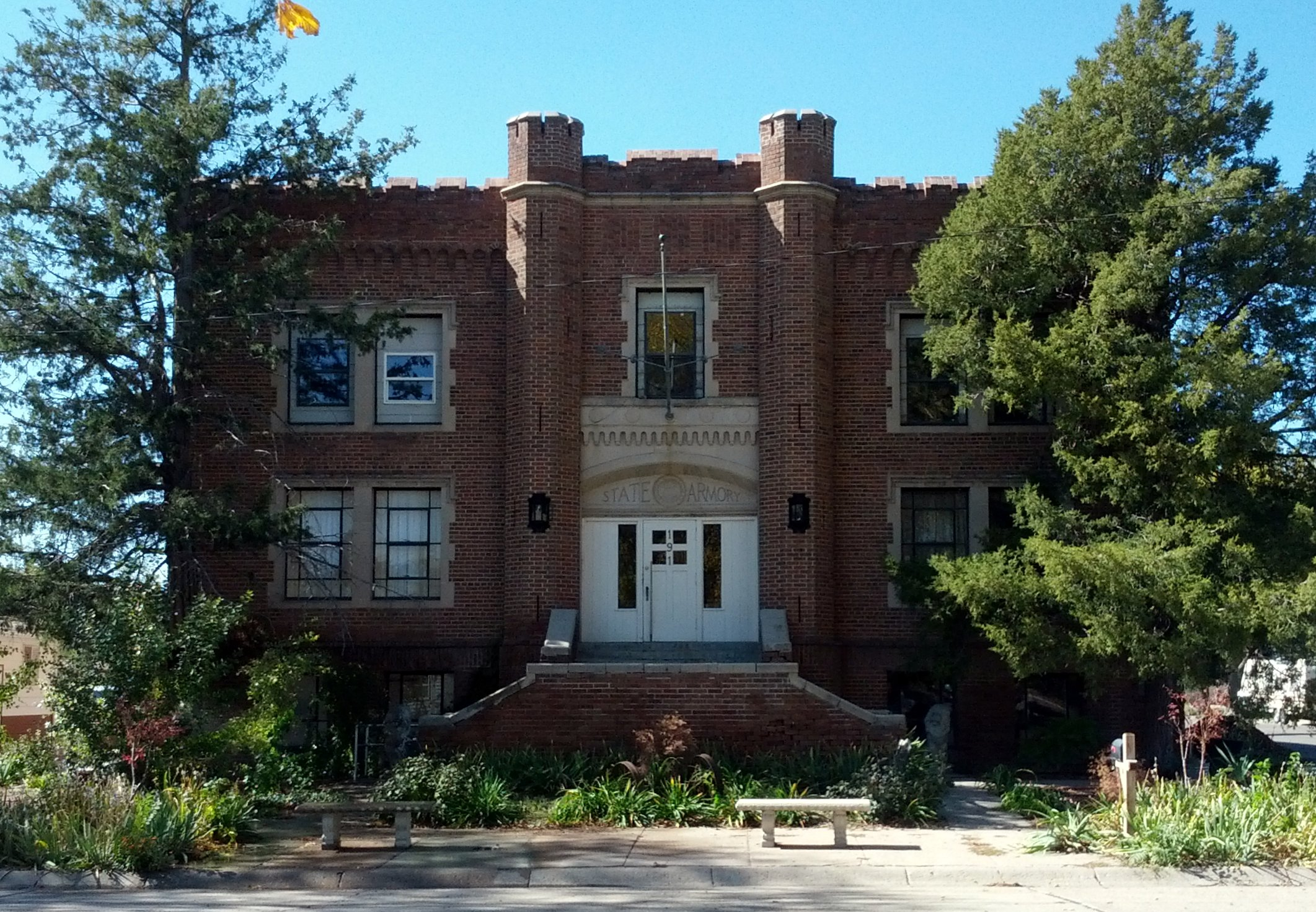
- Burlington State Armory

- Location within Colorado Location within the United States
- Location: Kit Carson County, Colorado; 191 14th St; Burlington, Colorado 80807
- Coordinates: 39°18′08″N 102°16′05″W
- Built: 1926
- Architect: Sidney Frazier
- Architectural style: Tudor Revival
- NRHP reference No.: 84000859
- Added to NRHP: September 20, 1984

Burlington State Armory is a historic building located at 191 14th St. in Burlington, Colorado.

== History ==
The Burlington State Armory was constructed by National Guard captain Sidney Frazier in 1926. He had designed numerous buildings in Colorado, Wyoming, Nebraska, Utah, and Washington including the Chemistry Building at Colorado State University. It is the only state armory in east-central Colorado and was used by the public for community gatherings and social events. On June 4, 1951, a Burlington resident held a funeral for himself in the Armory prior to his death.

The two-story building was designed with Tudor Revival architecture and contains similar features to other armories of the time, which included "a battlement roofline, a central pavilion with twin polygonal towers flanking the entrance, and a massive central doorway". It was added to the National Register of Historic Places in 1984.
