= Susan Phillips (politician) =

American politician

Susan C. Phillips (born June 18, 1949) is a Republican member of the Missouri House of Representatives. She lives in Kansas City.

She was born in Burlington, Colorado and graduated from Burlington High School. She went on to attend Atlantic Airline School and Maple Woods Community College of the Metropolitan Community Colleges of Kansas City.

Phillips was first elected to the Missouri House of Representatives in a special election in 1999, winning reelection in 2000, 2002, and 2004. She left office after being term limited in 2006. While in office, she served on the following committees: Children and Families (chair), Local Government, and Workforce Development and Workplace Safety.

She is a conservative Republican, and her primary interests include small business, child welfare, limiting abortion, preserving second amendment rights, and traditional marriage.

== Memberships ==
She is a member of the Riverside and Northland Chambers of Commerce, the River of Life Church, the National Federation of Independent Business, Western Missouri's Shooter Alliance, Platte Republican Association, Platte County Federation of Republican Women, and currently serves as Missouri Chair of the American Legislative Exchange Council (ALEC) and Missouri House Sponsor of TeenPact.

== Personal life ==
She is married to Keith Phillips. They have three children: Chris, Hannah, and Asher.
