= Colorado State Highway 58 =

Highway in Jefferson County, Colorado

State Highway 58
- Golden Freeway
- SH 58 highlighted in red

Route information
- Maintained by CDOT
- Length: 5.627 mi (9.056 km)
- Existed: 1920s–present

Major junctions
- West end: US 6 / SH 93 in Golden
- East end: I-70 in Wheat Ridge

Location
- Country: United States
- State: Colorado
- Counties: Jefferson

Highway system
- Colorado State Highway System; Interstate; US; State; Scenic
← SH 57	→ SH 59

State Highway 58 (SH 58) is a 5.627 mi (9.056 km) state highway in Jefferson County, Colorado. It begins at an at-grade intersection with US 6 and SH 93 in Golden and ends in Wheat Ridge. It is a freeway for its entire length except for its west junction, which is a signal light. The entire route is known as the Golden Freeway.

== Route description ==
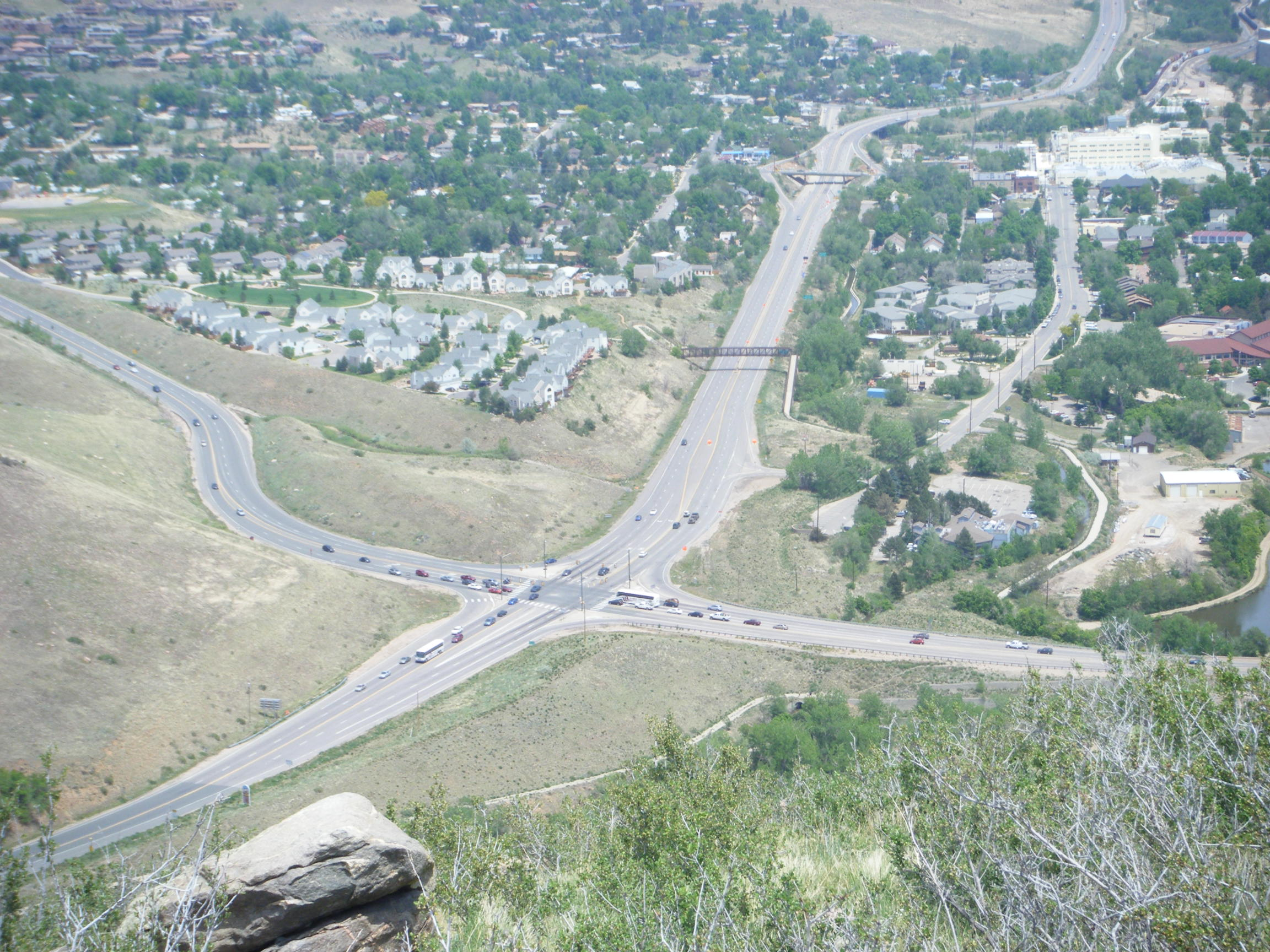
Intersection of SH 58, SH 93 and US 6 in Golden as seen from Mount Zion

The freeway begins at the junction with U.S. Highway 6 and State Highway 93 in Golden with a traffic signal. It then heads eastward as a freeway and interchanges with Washington Avenue, and after about a mile, it leaves the city of Golden. After another half mile, after having a westbound exit only with Boyd Street, it briefly enters and leaves the Golden city limit. After crossing over the Croke Canal, it has an exit at McIntyre Street. After entering the Wheat Ridge city limit, the route ends at a three-level interchange with Interstate 70.

The Iron Horse Motel at 17115 W. 44th Ave (closed) and the Colorado Railroad Museum at 17155 W. 44th Avenue are on the old SH 58 or 44th Avenue. 44th Avenue was State Highway 58 before the highway designation was assigned to the current route south of W. 44th Ave. Most of the current road is in unincorporated Jefferson County bounded by Wheat Ridge and Golden. The Coors property runs from McIntyre St. to Ford St. in Golden on the south side of SH 58.

== History ==
The route was established in the 1920s, with a western terminus at SH 119 north of Blackhawk and an eastern terminus at Federal Boulevard near Denver. A small business loop was added from Blackhawk to the intersection of SH 58 and SH 119.

=== Freeway bypass ===
In 1955, Jefferson County announced plans for a four-lane freeway between US 6 in Golden and the Valley Highway in Denver, approximately following West 44th Avenue from Golden to Mount Olivet Cemetery and West 48th Avenue to the Valley Highway, which the Golden Chamber of Commerce endorsed as beneficial to the city's economy and traffic conditions. The Colorado Department of Highways (CDH) adopted the West 48th Avenue portion of the corridor for Interstate 70, and, by 1958, had adopted the West 44th Avenue corridor for a realignment of SH 58, but had not allocated funding to it. Over the following years, the city and county continued to request funds for the project, and, in 1963, CDH budgeted to begin construction of the new SH 58. By this year, the east end of the highway had been cut back to Sheridan Boulevard.

An alignment for the freeway through Golden along Seventh Street was chosen in 1964 over a less costly routing along Tenth Street, with plans for a full diamond interchange at Washington Avenue and westbound right-in/right-out access from the Sunshine Park neighborhood. In August 1964, the state began acquiring the right-of-way for the first segment of the freeway between US 6 and Ford Street, including twenty-three homes and the former "Governor's Mansion."

By 1967, the segment of SH 58 between Wadsworth and Sheridan Boulevards had been removed from the state highway system. The freeway was completed in Golden by 1968, and CDH advanced plans to extend thereto a recently completed segment of I-70 near Youngfield Street, bypassing West 44th Avenue. The design called for an entrance ramp from West 44th Avenue, a full diamond interchange at McIntyre Street, and a partial interchange at I-70. Although the county proposed additional ramps between SH 58 and I-70, they were rejected due to the cost of additional bridges over Clear Creek and concerns over their proximity to other ramps on I-70. In May 1973, the freeway between Golden and I-70 opened to traffic, and the bypassed section of West 44th Avenue was removed from the state highway system.

=== Later development ===
The SH 93 Golden Bypass opened in July 1991, realigning SH 93 to meet US 6 and SH 58 at an at-grade intersection in west Golden. This intersection replaced an interchange between US 6 and SH 58 at the same location.

In 2002, in anticipation of development in the area, CDOT proposed adding ramps to the I-70/SH 58 interchange for the movements that were not included in its initial construction. After Wheat Ridge annexed land southwest of the interchange for a Cabela's-anchored development in 2005, the city and CDOT studied additional transportation network changes in the area; the recommended alternative included a new interchange on SH 58 at Cabela Drive, the development's primary road, connecting Holman Street on the north to West 32nd Avenue at Zinnia Street. The new ramps between I-70 and SH 58 were completed in December 2008, but, following Cabela's withdrawal from the development, the Holman Street interchange was not constructed.

CDOT began a project to replace the bridge over Ford Street in Golden in 2013. During construction, the temporary closure of the nearby "fishhook" entrance ramp from Clearview Parkway east of Boyd Street was made permanent with support from the Golden city council. A berm was installed in the ramp's place to reduce highway noise in the adjacent Sunshine Park neighborhood.

In 2016, Evergreen Devco Inc. purchased the Cabela's parcel west of I-70 to develop under the name Clear Creek Crossing. Coors Brewing Company retained ownership of the northern parcels adjacent to SH 58, and, without plans to develop them, CDOT and the Federal Highway Administration determined the Holman Street interchange would not be necessary to handle the anticipated traffic levels; however, the layout of Clear Creek Crossing allows for the connection to be made if the northern parcels are developed in the future.

== Exit list ==
The entire route is in Jefferson County.

Location	mi	km	Exit	Destinations	Notes
Golden	0.000	0.000	-	US 6 / SH 93 north – Idaho Springs, Boulder	Western terminus; southern terminus of SH 93; at-grade intersection
Golden	0.719	1.157	1A	Washington Ave	
Golden	2.360	3.798	1B	Boyd Street	Westbound exit only
	3.817	6.143	3	McIntyre Street	
Wheat Ridge	5.627	9.056	5	I-70 – Denver, Grand Junction	Eastern terminus; Exit 5A for I-70 east (Denver) and Exit 5B for I-70 west (Grand Junction); I-70 exit 265
1.000 mi = 1.609 km; 1.000 km = 0.621 mi: Incomplete access
