= Elitch Gardens Carousel =

Carousel in Burlington, Colorado

- Philadelphia Toboggan Company Carousel #6
- U.S. National Register of Historic Places
- U.S. National Historic Landmark
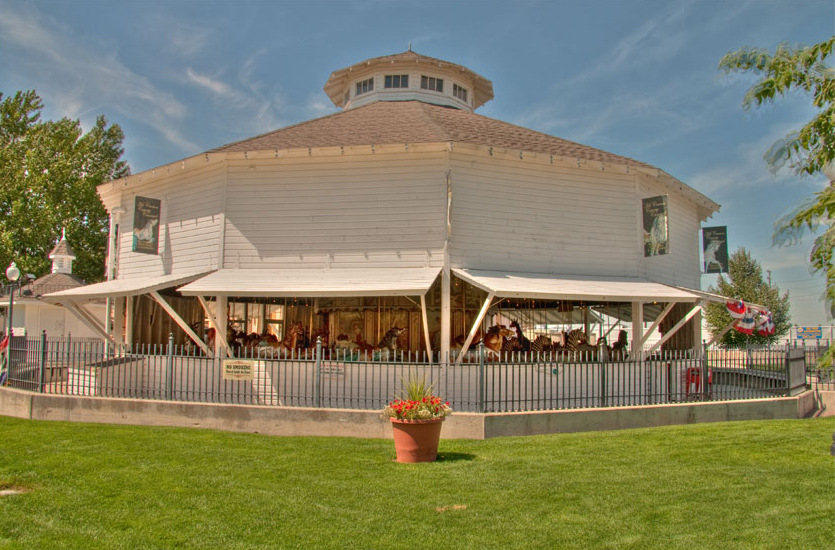
- The carousel in 2009

- Location within Colorado Location within the United States
- Location: Kit Carson County Fairgrounds; 815 15th Street; Burlington, Colorado 80807
- Coordinates: 39°18′36″N 102°16′10″W
- Built: 1905
- Architect: Philadelphia Toboggan Company
- NRHP reference No.: 78000861

Significant dates
- Added to NRHP: December 19, 1978
- Designated NHL: February 27, 1987

Elitch Gardens Carousel, also known as Philadelphia Toboggan Company Carousel #6 or as the Kit Carson County Carousel, is a 1905 Philadelphia Toboggan Company carousel located near Burlington, Colorado.

== History ==
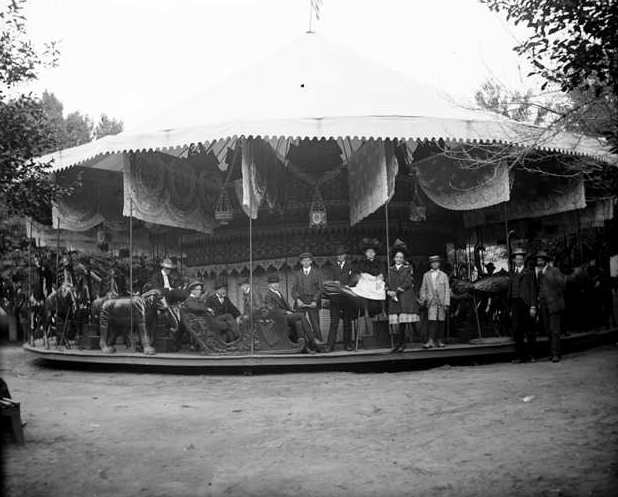
Not PTC #6 but a possible earlier Carousel at Elitch's

Philadelphia Toboggan Company Carousel #6 was manufactured in 1905 for Elitch Gardens. It was used at the park every summer until 1928, when the park acquired a new carousel also made by the Philadelphia Toboggan Company (PTC #51) and sold the existing carousel and band organ to Kit Carson County for $1,200, including the cost of delivery by train to Burlington. During the Depression, the carousel spent six years in storage, re-entering use in 1937.

Restoration of the carousel's band organ began in 1976. The Kit Carson County Carousel was added to the National Register of Historic Places in 1978 and designated a National Historic Landmark in 1987. Restoration efforts continued in 1987 with work to restore the original paint to the animals, chariots, and the outer rim, new siding applied to the carousel building and Victorian-inspired landscaping. A second restoration to the carousel animals took place in 1992. Grants financed research into and restoration of the carousel's original lighting, machinery room, moldings on the paintings, and the Wurlitzer band organ in 1997.

=== 1981 theft and return ===
In May 1981, thieves removed three small horses and a donkey from the carousel during a heavy rainstorm. The animals were later recovered from a Salina, Kansas, warehouse and returned to the carousel following a parade through Burlington in October 1981. Commemorative markers on the carousel mark the recovered animals' locations.

== Carousel details ==
Type: 3 rows, Park, Stationary, all wood composition
Figures: 25 standing horses, 4 chariots; standing horses include 2 burros, 3 camels, 1 dog, 3 deer, 3 giraffes, 3 goats, 1 hippocampus, 1 lion, 1 tiger, and 3 zebras
Music: 1909 Wurlitzer 155 "Monster" military band organ

It is the only antique carousel in America retaining its original paint on both the scenery panels and the animals, and it is the only surviving menagerie (having other animals in addition to horses) carousel made by Philadelphia Toboggan Company.

== See also ==
- Amusement rides on the National Register of Historic Places
- National Register of Historic Places listings in Kit Carson County, Colorado
- List of National Historic Landmarks in Colorado
