= Cope, Colorado =

Unincorporated community in Colorado, US

- Census-designated place
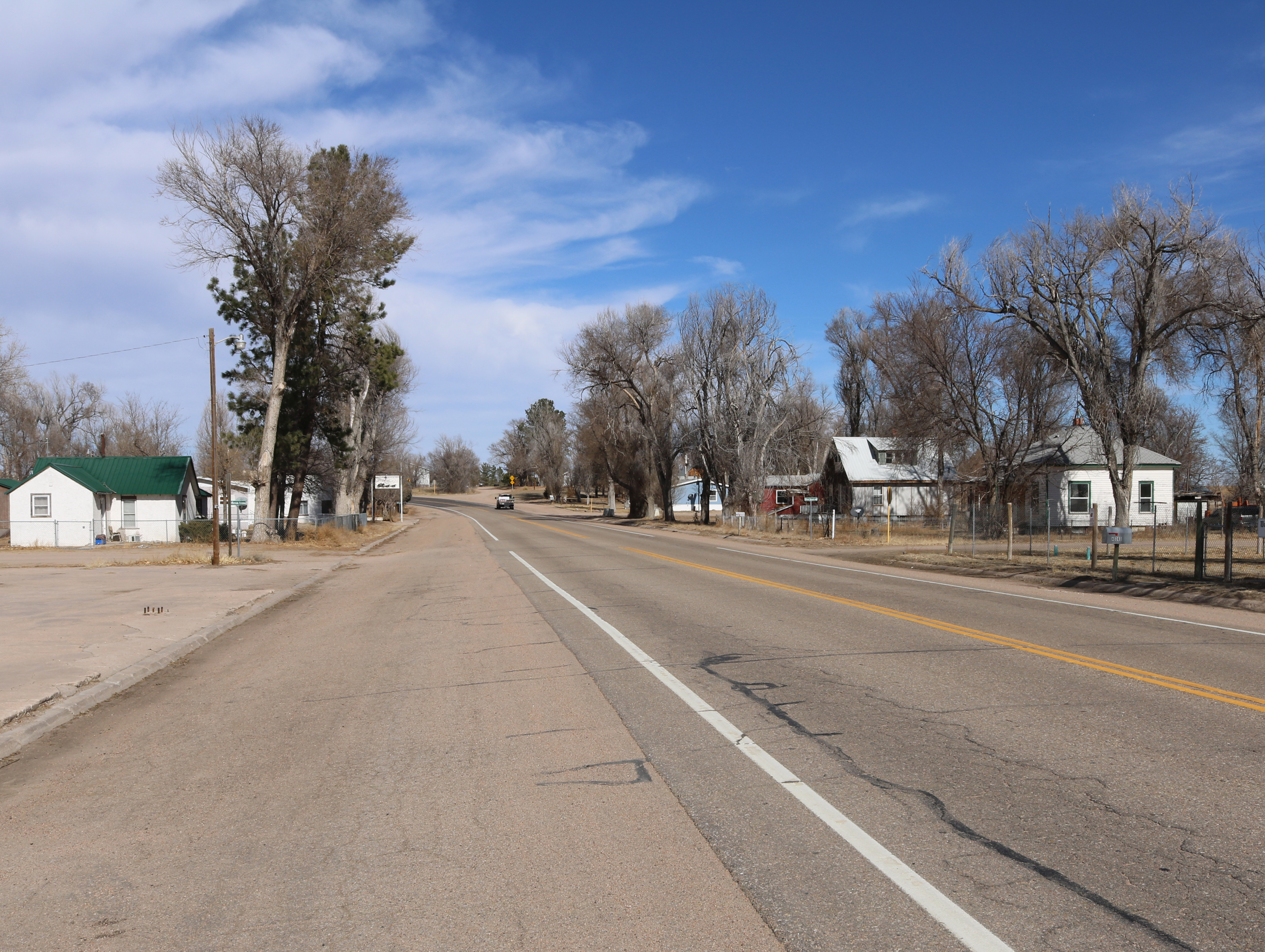
- U.S. Route 36 in Cope (2017)

- Location of the Cope CDP, Colorado. Cope (Colorado)
- Coordinates: 39°40′09″N 102°51′00″W
- Country: United States
- State: Colorado
- County: Washington

Government
  - Type: Unincorporated community
  - Body: Washington County

Area
  - Total: 1.827 sq mi (4.731 km^{2})
  - Land: 1.796 sq mi (4.651 km^{2})
  - Water: 0.031 sq mi (0.080 km^{2})
- Elevation: 4,429 ft (1,350 m)

Population (2020)
  - Total: 53
  - Density: 30/sq mi (11/km^{2})
- Time zone: UTC−07:00 (MST)
  - Summer (DST): UTC−06:00 (MDT)
- ZIP code: 80812
- Area codes: 970/748
- GNIS CDP ID: 2805926
- FIPS code: 08-17100

Cope is an unincorporated town, a post office, and a census-designated place (CDP) located in and governed by Washington County, Colorado, United States. The population was 53 at the 2020 census. The Cope post office has the ZIP Code 80812.

== History ==
The Cope, Colorado, post office opened on July 16, 1889. The community was named after Johnathon C. Cope, a railroad official.

== Geography ==
At the 2020 United States Census, the Cope CDP had an area of 1,169 acres (4.731 km^{2}), including 20 acres (0.080 km^{2}) of water.

== Demographics ==
The United States Census Bureau defined the Cope CDP for the United States Census 2020.

Cope CDP, Colorado
Year	Pop.	±%
2020	53	—
Source: United States Census Bureau

== See also ==
- List of census-designated places in Colorado
