= Picacho, New Mexico =

Unincorporated community in New Mexico, United States

- Unincorporated community
- Location within New Mexico Location within the United States
- Coordinates: 33°21′06″N 105°08′42″W
- Country: United States
- State: New Mexico
- County: Lincoln
- Elevation: 4,987 ft (1,520 m)
- Time zone: UTC-7 (Mountain (MST))
  - Summer (DST): UTC-6 (MDT)
- ZIP codes: 88343
- Area code: 575
- GNIS feature ID: 899845

Picacho is an unincorporated community located in Lincoln County, New Mexico, United States. The community is located on U.S. Route 70, 30.5 miles (49.1 km) east of Ruidoso. Picacho has a post office with ZIP code 88343, which opened on June 11, 1891.

== Climate ==
According to the Köppen Climate Classification system, Picacho has a cold semi-arid climate, abbreviated "BSk" on climate maps. The hottest temperature recorded in Picacho was 106 °F (41.1 °C) on June 26–27, 1994, while the coldest temperature recorded was −14 °F (−25.6 °C) on February 3, 2011.

Climate data for Picacho, New Mexico, 1991–2020 normals, extremes 1980–2019
| Month | Jan | Feb | Mar | Apr | May | Jun | Jul | Aug | Sep | Oct | Nov | Dec | Year |
|---|---|---|---|---|---|---|---|---|---|---|---|---|---|
| Record high °F (°C) | 78 (26) | 83 (28) | 87 (31) | 93 (34) | 98 (37) | 106 (41) | 104 (40) | 104 (40) | 100 (38) | 93 (34) | 84 (29) | 80 (27) | 106 (41) |
| Mean maximum °F (°C) | 71.6 (22.0) | 74.2 (23.4) | 79.6 (26.4) | 84.8 (29.3) | 92.1 (33.4) | 98.5 (36.9) | 97.3 (36.3) | 94.4 (34.7) | 91.5 (33.1) | 86.0 (30.0) | 78.0 (25.6) | 72.2 (22.3) | 99.9 (37.7) |
| Mean daily maximum °F (°C) | 57.8 (14.3) | 61.3 (16.3) | 67.8 (19.9) | 74.6 (23.7) | 82.0 (27.8) | 90.4 (32.4) | 89.9 (32.2) | 88.3 (31.3) | 83.5 (28.6) | 75.4 (24.1) | 65.2 (18.4) | 57.2 (14.0) | 74.5 (23.6) |
| Daily mean °F (°C) | 42.2 (5.7) | 45.1 (7.3) | 51.1 (10.6) | 57.6 (14.2) | 65.5 (18.6) | 73.7 (23.2) | 75.6 (24.2) | 74.2 (23.4) | 68.4 (20.2) | 58.9 (14.9) | 49.0 (9.4) | 41.8 (5.4) | 58.6 (14.8) |
| Mean daily minimum °F (°C) | 26.6 (−3.0) | 28.9 (−1.7) | 34.4 (1.3) | 40.6 (4.8) | 49.0 (9.4) | 57.0 (13.9) | 61.3 (16.3) | 60.1 (15.6) | 53.3 (11.8) | 42.4 (5.8) | 32.7 (0.4) | 26.3 (−3.2) | 42.7 (6.0) |
| Mean minimum °F (°C) | 11.1 (−11.6) | 11.6 (−11.3) | 18.0 (−7.8) | 25.3 (−3.7) | 35.9 (2.2) | 45.7 (7.6) | 53.2 (11.8) | 52.0 (11.1) | 41.0 (5.0) | 27.7 (−2.4) | 17.4 (−8.1) | 7.1 (−13.8) | 4.7 (−15.2) |
| Record low °F (°C) | 1 (−17) | −14 (−26) | 5 (−15) | 14 (−10) | 26 (−3) | 35 (2) | 43 (6) | 44 (7) | 32 (0) | 7 (−14) | 3 (−16) | −12 (−24) | −14 (−26) |
| Average precipitation inches (mm) | 0.35 (8.9) | 0.35 (8.9) | 0.54 (14) | 0.69 (18) | 1.04 (26) | 1.45 (37) | 2.15 (55) | 2.85 (72) | 2.54 (65) | 1.14 (29) | 0.48 (12) | 0.60 (15) | 14.18 (360.8) |
| Average snowfall inches (cm) | 3.0 (7.6) | 1.7 (4.3) | 0.9 (2.3) | 0.3 (0.76) | 0.0 (0.0) | 0.0 (0.0) | 0.0 (0.0) | 0.0 (0.0) | 0.0 (0.0) | 0.3 (0.76) | 1.0 (2.5) | 5.2 (13) | 12.4 (31.22) |
| Average precipitation days (≥ 0.01 in) | 2.4 | 1.9 | 2.3 | 2.4 | 3.9 | 4.7 | 7.0 | 8.7 | 6.6 | 4.0 | 2.3 | 2.7 | 48.9 |
| Average snowy days (≥ 0.1 in) | 1.4 | 0.9 | 0.5 | 0.1 | 0.0 | 0.0 | 0.0 | 0.0 | 0.0 | 0.2 | 0.5 | 1.7 | 5.3 |
Source 1: NOAA
Source 2: National Weather Service (mean maxima/minima 1981–2010)
