= KNAB-FM =

- Burlington, Colorado; United States
- Frequency: 104.1 MHz
- Branding: KNAB FM 104.1

Programming
- Format: Country
- Affiliations: Citadel Broadcasting, Westwood One

Ownership
- Owner: KNAB, Inc.

History
- First air date: March 7, 1980

Technical information
- Licensing authority: FCC
- Facility ID: 35205
- Class: C1
- ERP: 51,000 watts
- HAAT: 110 meters
- Transmitter coordinates: 39°17′41″N 102°15′37″W

Links
- Public license information: Public file; LMS
- Website: KNAB-FM Online

KNAB-FM (104.1 FM, The Peoples Choice) is a radio station broadcasting a country music format. Licensed to Burlington, Colorado, U.S., the station is currently owned by Knab and features programming from Citadel Broadcasting and Westwood One.
