= Loveland, Oklahoma =

- Town
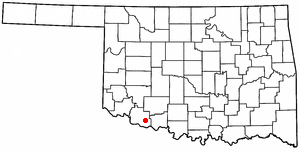
- Location of Loveland, Oklahoma
- Coordinates: 34°18′17″N 98°46′15″W
- Country: United States
- State: Oklahoma
- County: Tillman

Area
  - Total: 0.23 sq mi (0.59 km^{2})
  - Land: 0.22 sq mi (0.58 km^{2})
  - Water: 0 sq mi (0.00 km^{2})
- Elevation: 1,073 ft (327 m)

Population (2020)
  - Total: 13
  - Density: 57.6/sq mi (22.24/km^{2})
- Time zone: UTC-6 (Central (CST))
  - Summer (DST): UTC-5 (CDT)
- ZIP codes: 73546, 73553
- Area code: 580
- FIPS code: 40-44150
- GNIS feature ID: 2412921

Loveland is a town in Tillman County, Oklahoma, United States. It is located about 38 miles southwest of Lawton, Oklahoma. The population was 13 at the 2020 Census. Loveland once had a post office that has since closed. The post office was popular around Valentine's Day, when people often drove many miles to have their valentines postmarked "Loveland".

== Geography ==
According to the United States Census Bureau, the town has a total area of 0.2 square miles (0.52 km^{2}), all land.

== Demographics ==
Historical population
Census	Pop.	Note	%±
1920	191		—
1930	106		−44.5%
1940	101		−4.7%
1950	96		−5.0%
1960	90		−6.2%
1970	36		−60.0%
1980	21		−41.7%
1990	13		−38.1%
2000	14		7.7%
2010	13		−7.1%
2020	13		0.0%
U.S. Decennial Census

=== 2020 census ===
As of the 2020 census, Loveland had a population of 13. The median age was 51.5 years. 0.0% of residents were under the age of 18 and 30.8% of residents were 65 years of age or older. For every 100 females there were 44.4 males, and for every 100 females age 18 and over there were 44.4 males age 18 and over.

0.0% of residents lived in urban areas, while 100.0% lived in rural areas.

There were 7 households in Loveland, of which 57.1% had children under the age of 18 living in them. Of all households, 42.9% were married-couple households, 0.0% were households with a male householder and no spouse or partner present, and 57.1% were households with a female householder and no spouse or partner present. About 14.3% of all households were made up of individuals and 0.0% had someone living alone who was 65 years of age or older.

There were 7 housing units, of which 0.0% were vacant. The homeowner vacancy rate was 0.0% and the rental vacancy rate was 0.0%.

Racial composition as of the 2020 census
Race	Number	Percent
White	9	69.2%
Black or African American	0	0.0%
American Indian and Alaska Native	0	0.0%
Asian	0	0.0%
Native Hawaiian and Other Pacific Islander	0	0.0%
Some other race	4	30.8%
Two or more races	0	0.0%
Hispanic or Latino (of any race)	4	30.8%

=== 2000 census ===
As of the census of 2000, there were 14 people, 6 households, and 6 families residing in the town. The population density was 62.1 inhabitants per square mile (24.0/km^{2}). There were 8 housing units at an average density of 35.5 per square mile (13.7/km^{2}). The racial makeup of the town was 92.86% White and 7.14% African American.

There were 6 households, out of which 33.3% had children under the age of 18 living with them, 100.0% were married couples living together, and 0.0% were non-families. No households were made up of individuals, and none had someone living alone who was 65 years of age or older. The average household size was 2.33 and the average family size was 2.33.

In the town, the population was spread out, with 14.3% under the age of 18, 14.3% from 18 to 24, 21.4% from 25 to 44, 35.7% from 45 to 64, and 14.3% who were 65 years of age or older. The median age was 43 years. For every 100 females, there were 133.3 males. For every 100 females age 18 and over, there were 100.0 males.

The median income for a household in the town was $25,000, and the median income for a family was $25,000. Males had a median income of $17,500 versus $0 for females. The per capita income for the town was $7,777. None of the population and none of the families were below the poverty line.
