= KNAB (AM) =

- Burlington, Colorado; United States
- Frequency: 1140 kHz
- Branding: KNAB 1140 AM 93.9 FM

Programming
- Format: Adult standards
- Affiliations: Citadel Broadcasting, Westwood One

Ownership
- Owner: KNAB, Inc.

History
- First air date: July 11, 1967

Technical information
- Licensing authority: FCC
- Facility ID: 35206
- Class: D
- Power: 1,000 watts day 10 watts night
- Transmitter coordinates: 39°17′41″N 102°15′38.7″W
- Translator: 93.9 K230CD (Burlington)

Links
- Public license information: Public file; LMS
- Website: knabradio.com

KNAB (1140 AM, The Peoples Choice) is a radio station broadcasting an adult standards music format. Licensed to Burlington, Colorado, United States. The station is currently owned by KNAB, Inc. and features programming from Citadel Broadcasting and Westwood One.
