= Bethune, Colorado =

Statutory town in Kit Carson County, Colorado, United States

- statutory town
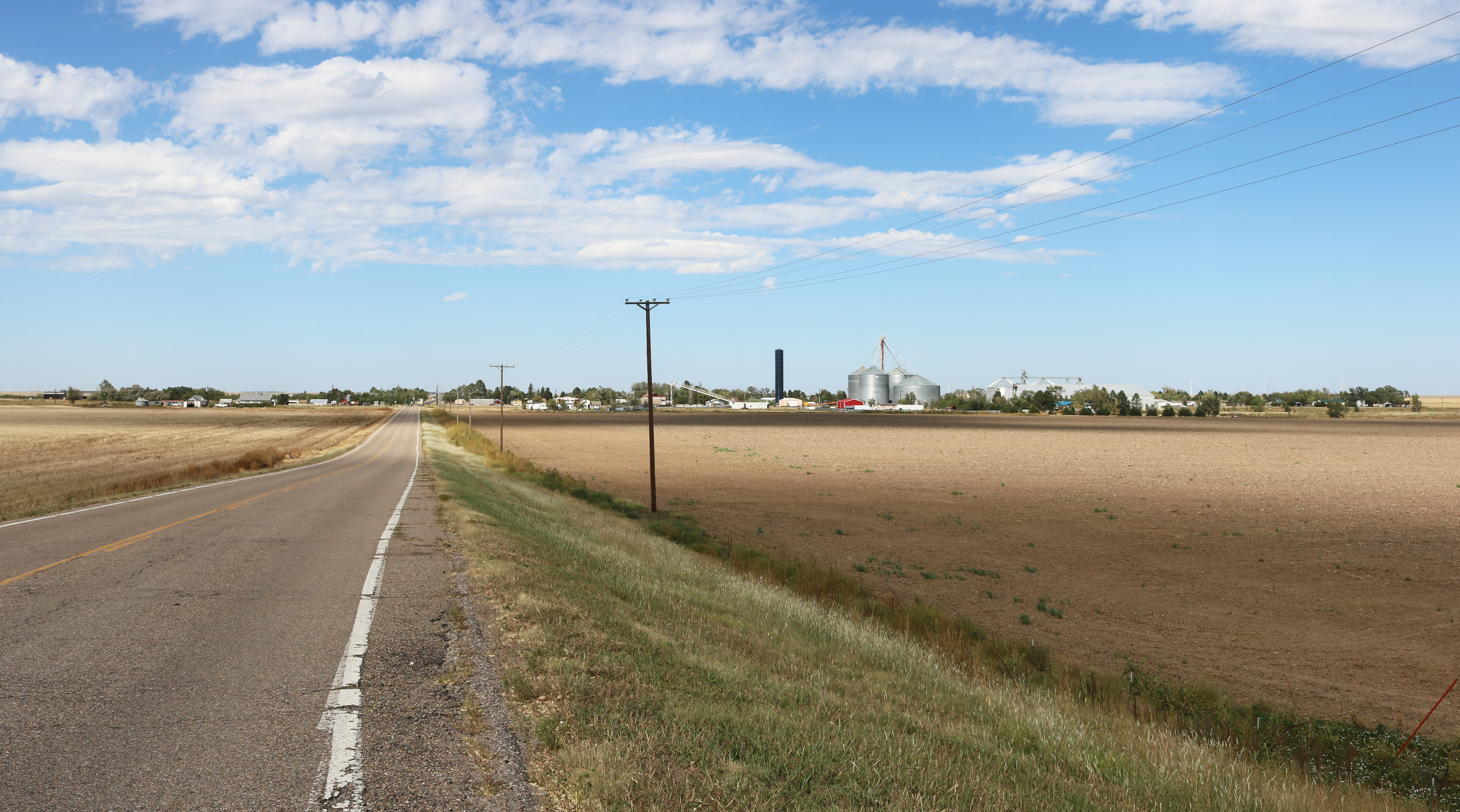
- Bethune from County Road 40 and I70 (2019)

- Seal

- Location within Kit Carson County and Colorado
- Coordinates: 39°18′14″N 102°25′24″W
- Country: United States
- State: Colorado
- County: Kit Carson
- Incorporated: June 10, 1926

Government
  - Type: statutory town

Area
  - Total: 0.162 sq mi (0.420 km^{2})
  - Land: 0.162 sq mi (0.420 km^{2})
  - Water: 0 sq mi (0.000 km^{2})
- Elevation: 4,259 ft (1,298 m)

Population (2020)
  - Total: 183
  - Density: 1,130/sq mi (436/km^{2})
- Time zone: UTC−07:00 (MST)
  - Summer (DST): UTC−06:00 (MDT)
- ZIP Code: 80805
- Area code: 719
- GNIS town ID: 2411684
- FIPS code: 08-06530

Bethune is a statutory town located in Kit Carson County, Colorado, United States. The town population was 183 at the 2020 United States census. It is located along U.S. Highway 24 that is north of an exit on Interstate 70.

== History ==
The Bethune, Colorado, post office opened on January 19, 1889. The Town of Bethune was incorporated on June 10, 1926.

== Geography ==
At the 2020 United States census, the town had a total area of 104 acres (0.420 km^{2}), all of it land.

== Demographics ==
Historical population
| Census | Pop. | Note | %± |
|---|---|---|---|
| 1930 | 97 | | — |
| 1940 | 79 | | −18.6% |
| 1950 | 71 | | −10.1% |
| 1960 | 70 | | −1.4% |
| 1970 | 99 | | 41.4% |
| 1980 | 149 | | 50.5% |
| 1990 | 173 | | 16.1% |
| 2000 | 225 | | 30.1% |
| 2010 | 237 | | 5.3% |
| 2020 | 183 | | −22.8% |
U.S. Decennial Census

According to the most recent Census Bureau demographics available, released in December 2018, Bethune has a population of 227, making it the 5th largest town or city in population out of 10 total in the area. The city with the highest population in the area is Burlington, with a population of 5,468. Burlington is the county seat of Kit Carson County.

From the census of 2000, there were 225 people, 74 households, and 58 families residing in Bethune. The population density was 1,476.8 inhabitants per square mile (570.2/km^{2}). There were 81 housing units at an average density of 531.7 per square mile (205.3/km^{2}). The racial makeup of the town was 73.78% White, 0.89% Native American, 0.44% Asian, 23.56% from other races, and 1.33% from two or more races. Hispanic or Latino of any race were 31.11% of the population.

There were 74 households, out of which 48.6% had children under the age of 18 living with them, 66.2% were married couples living together, 8.1% had a female householder with no husband present, and 21.6% were non-families. 20.3% of all households were made up of individuals, and 6.8% had someone living alone who was 65 years of age or older. The average household size was 3.04 and the average family size was 3.50.

In the town, the population was spread out, with 35.6% under the age of 18, 11.6% from 18 to 24, 28.0% from 25 to 44, 17.3% from 45 to 64, and 7.6% who were 65 years of age or older. The median age was 27 years. For every 100 females, there were 106.4 males. For every 100 females age 18 and over, there were 101.4 males.

The median income for a household in the town was $28,958, and the median income for a family was $30,833. Males had a median income of $23,750 versus $16,250 for females. The per capita income for the town was $13,994. About 21.9% of families and 27.8% of the population were below the poverty line, including 41.8% of those under the age of eighteen and none of those 65 or over.

== Notable people ==
Notable individuals who were born in or have lived in Bethune include:

- Denver Pyle (1920-1997), actor

== See also ==
- List of municipalities in Colorado
