= Burlington, Colorado =

Home-rule city in Kit Carson County, Colorado, United States

- Home rule city
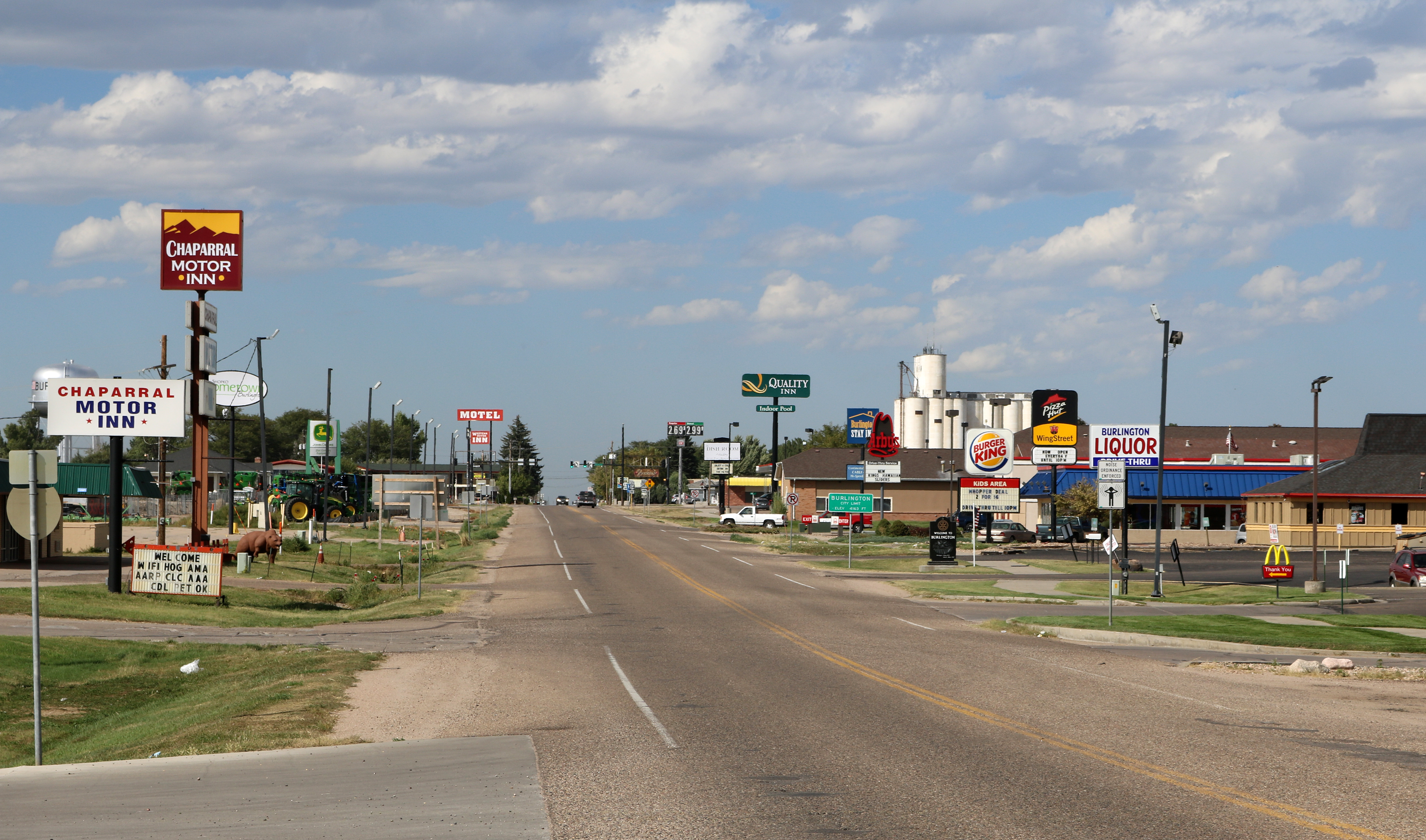
- South Lincoln Street in Burlington (2019)

- Location within Kit Carson County and Colorado
- Coordinates: 39°18′15″N 102°15′28″W
- Country: United States
- State: Colorado
- County: Kit Carson
- Incorporated: 1888

Government
  - Type: Home rule city

Area
  - Total: 2.153 sq mi (5.575 km^{2})
  - Land: 2.153 sq mi (5.575 km^{2})
  - Water: 0 sq mi (0.000 km^{2})
- Elevation: 4,167 ft (1,270 m)

Population (2020)
  - Total: 3,172
  - Density: 1,474/sq mi (569.0/km^{2})
- Time zone: UTC−07:00 (MST)
  - Summer (DST): UTC−06:00 (MDT)
- ZIP Code: 80807
- Area code: 719
- FIPS code: 08-10600
- GNIS town ID: 2409946
- Website: burlingtoncolo.com

Burlington is the home rule city that is the county seat of, and the most populous municipality in, Kit Carson County, Colorado, United States. The city population was 3,172 at the 2020 United States census.

== History ==
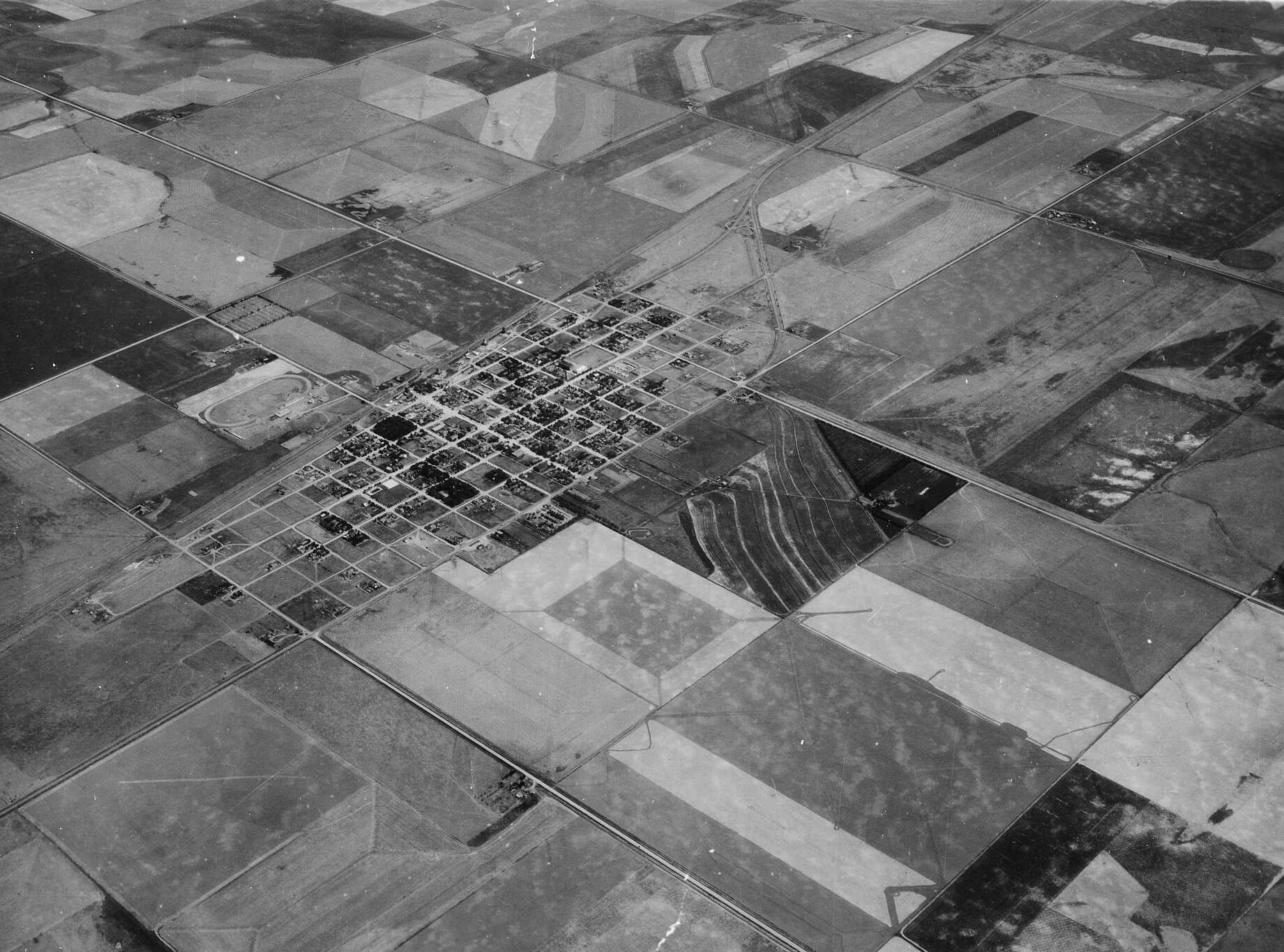
Burlington, 1943

Burlington was originally laid out one mile west of its present location in 1887 by a man named Lowell in anticipation of the arrival of the railroad. In addition to having the location wrong, Lowell also did not have title to the land. When the railroad did arrive, the Chicago, Rock Island and Pacific Railroad, it built its depot at the present site of Burlington and those who had built in Old Burlington moved their buildings to the new townsite.

The Burlington, Colorado, post office opened on April 29, 1887, and the Town of Burlington was incorporated on January 12, 1888. Trains began running in 1888. "The Settlement", about 12 miles northwest of Burlington, was settled by German immigrants from Russia, many from Hoffnungstal, South Russia, who, in addition to their homesteads, built Congregational and Lutheran churches.

Burlington, CO is on the Loewen database of possible sundown towns, although Tougaloo College recognizes that it is "surely not" still one.

== Geography ==
Burlington is located on the High Plains in eastern Colorado.

At the 2020 United States census, the city had a total area of 1,378 acres (5.575 km^{2}), all of it land.

The easternmost interchange in Colorado on Interstate 70 is located at Burlington, 12 miles (19 km) west of the Kansas state line.

=== Climate ===
Burlington has a typical High Plains cool semi-arid climate with hot, dry summers punctuated by occasional heavy thunderstorm rains, and cold, very dry winters. Snowfall is occasionally heavy, with an average annual amount of 33.7 inches (86 cm) – but mostly the winter weather is very dry and extremely variable in temperatures. More than 33 afternoons (over a third) each winter can be expected to reach or exceed 50 °F (10 °C), but 4.9 mornings each year will drop to or under 0 °F (−17.8 °C) and 24.3 afternoons do not top freezing.

Climate data for Burlington, Colorado, 1991–2020 normals, extremes 1903–present
Month	Jan	Feb	Mar	Apr	May	Jun	Jul	Aug	Sep	Oct	Nov	Dec	Year
Record high °F (°C)	79 (26)	85 (29)	99 (37)	95 (35)	100 (38)	112 (44)	113 (45)	109 (43)	104 (40)	100 (38)	87 (31)	81 (27)	113 (45)
Mean maximum °F (°C)	66.6 (19.2)	69.5 (20.8)	79.8 (26.6)	85.6 (29.8)	92.0 (33.3)	99.2 (37.3)	101.3 (38.5)	98.8 (37.1)	95.6 (35.3)	88.7 (31.5)	76.5 (24.7)	67.0 (19.4)	102.2 (39.0)
Mean daily maximum °F (°C)	43.8 (6.6)	46.2 (7.9)	56.5 (13.6)	64.0 (17.8)	73.6 (23.1)	85.2 (29.6)	90.5 (32.5)	87.9 (31.1)	80.5 (26.9)	67.4 (19.7)	53.8 (12.1)	44.0 (6.7)	66.1 (19.0)
Daily mean °F (°C)	30.6 (−0.8)	32.6 (0.3)	41.4 (5.2)	48.8 (9.3)	59.1 (15.1)	70.3 (21.3)	75.5 (24.2)	73.3 (22.9)	65.3 (18.5)	52.0 (11.1)	40.0 (4.4)	31.1 (−0.5)	51.7 (10.9)
Mean daily minimum °F (°C)	17.3 (−8.2)	19.0 (−7.2)	26.3 (−3.2)	33.7 (0.9)	44.6 (7.0)	55.4 (13.0)	60.5 (15.8)	58.7 (14.8)	50.0 (10.0)	36.7 (2.6)	26.1 (−3.3)	18.2 (−7.7)	37.2 (2.9)
Mean minimum °F (°C)	−1.2 (−18.4)	1.3 (−17.1)	9.5 (−12.5)	19.5 (−6.9)	31.1 (−0.5)	45.2 (7.3)	52.8 (11.6)	50.5 (10.3)	36.9 (2.7)	20.4 (−6.4)	9.8 (−12.3)	0.8 (−17.3)	−6.3 (−21.3)
Record low °F (°C)	−25 (−32)	−23 (−31)	−22 (−30)	−3 (−19)	21 (−6)	31 (−1)	36 (2)	37 (3)	20 (−7)	−1 (−18)	−8 (−22)	−22 (−30)	−25 (−32)
Average precipitation inches (mm)	0.36 (9.1)	0.59 (15)	1.01 (26)	2.00 (51)	2.70 (69)	2.80 (71)	3.36 (85)	2.69 (68)	1.29 (33)	1.42 (36)	0.52 (13)	0.51 (13)	19.25 (489.1)
Average snowfall inches (cm)	5.3 (13)	6.8 (17)	5.8 (15)	3.9 (9.9)	0.3 (0.76)	0.0 (0.0)	0.0 (0.0)	0.0 (0.0)	0.0 (0.0)	2.7 (6.9)	3.7 (9.4)	5.2 (13)	33.7 (84.96)
Average extreme snow depth inches (cm)	3.1 (7.9)	3.5 (8.9)	2.7 (6.9)	1.8 (4.6)	0.3 (0.76)	0.0 (0.0)	0.0 (0.0)	0.0 (0.0)	0.0 (0.0)	1.9 (4.8)	2.4 (6.1)	3.0 (7.6)	7.6 (19)
Average precipitation days (≥ 0.01 in)	3.1	3.5	4.2	6.2	8.7	7.8	8.3	7.3	3.9	5.1	3.2	3.4	64.7
Average snowy days (≥ 0.1 in)	3.0	3.1	2.6	1.4	0.2	0.0	0.0	0.0	0.0	1.0	2.0	3.1	16.4
Source 1: NOAA
Source 2: National Weather Service

== Demographics ==
Historical population
Census	Pop.	Note	%±
1890	146		—
1900	183		25.3%
1910	368		101.1%
1920	991		169.3%
1930	1,280		29.2%
1940	1,280		0.0%
1950	2,247		75.5%
1960	2,090		−7.0%
1970	2,828		35.3%
1980	3,107		9.9%
1990	2,941		−5.3%
2000	3,678		25.1%
2010	4,254		15.7%
2020	3,172		−25.4%
U.S. Decennial Census

=== 2020 census ===
As of the 2020 census, Burlington had a population of 3,172. The median age was 36.4 years. 26.4% of residents were under the age of 18 and 17.5% of residents were 65 years of age or older. For every 100 females there were 95.6 males, and for every 100 females age 18 and over there were 92.1 males age 18 and over.

0.0% of residents lived in urban areas, while 100.0% lived in rural areas.

There were 1,256 households in Burlington, of which 33.2% had children under the age of 18 living in them. Of all households, 50.0% were married-couple households, 18.7% were households with a male householder and no spouse or partner present, and 25.8% were households with a female householder and no spouse or partner present. About 29.7% of all households were made up of individuals and 13.5% had someone living alone who was 65 years of age or older.

There were 1,470 housing units, of which 14.6% were vacant. The homeowner vacancy rate was 1.6% and the rental vacancy rate was 20.0%.

Racial composition as of the 2020 census
Race	Number	Percent
White	2,265	71.4%
Black or African American	10	0.3%
American Indian and Alaska Native	25	0.8%
Asian	22	0.7%
Native Hawaiian and Other Pacific Islander	7	0.2%
Some other race	408	12.9%
Two or more races	435	13.7%
Hispanic or Latino (of any race)	950	29.9%

=== 2010 census ===
As of the census of 2010, there were 4,191 people, 1,478 households, and ? families residing in the city. The population density was 1,995.7 inhabitants per square mile (770.5/km^{2}). There were 1,478 housing units at an average density of 703.8 per square mile (271.7/km^{2}). The racial makeup of the city was 84.3% White, 6.2% African American, 1.2% Native American, 0.5% Asian, 0.1% Pacific Islander, 8.5% from other races, and 0.90% from two or more races. Hispanic or Latino of any race were 27.5% of the population.

There were 1,287 households, out of which 32.9% had children under the age of 18 living with them, 53.0% were married couples living together, 8.6% had a female householder with no husband present, and 34.7% were non-families. 30.3% of all households were made up of individuals, and 13.9% had someone living alone who was 65 years of age or older. The average household size was 2.47 and the average family size was 3.11.

In the city, the population was spread out, with 25.2% under the age of 18, 8.6% from 18 to 24, 32.8% from 25 to 44, 19.7% from 45 to 64, and 13.7% who were 65 years of age or older. The median age was 36 years. For every 100 females, there were 121.6 males. For every 100 females age 18 and over, there were 126.2 males.

=== Income and poverty ===
The median income for a household in the city was $33,854, and the median income for a family was $42,500. Males had a median income of $29,167 versus $19,018 for females. The per capita income for the city was $16,054. About 12.2% of families and 14.8% of the population were below the poverty line, including 20.3% of those under age 18 and 15.8% of those age 65 or over.

== Government ==
Burlington is a home rule municipality.

== Education ==
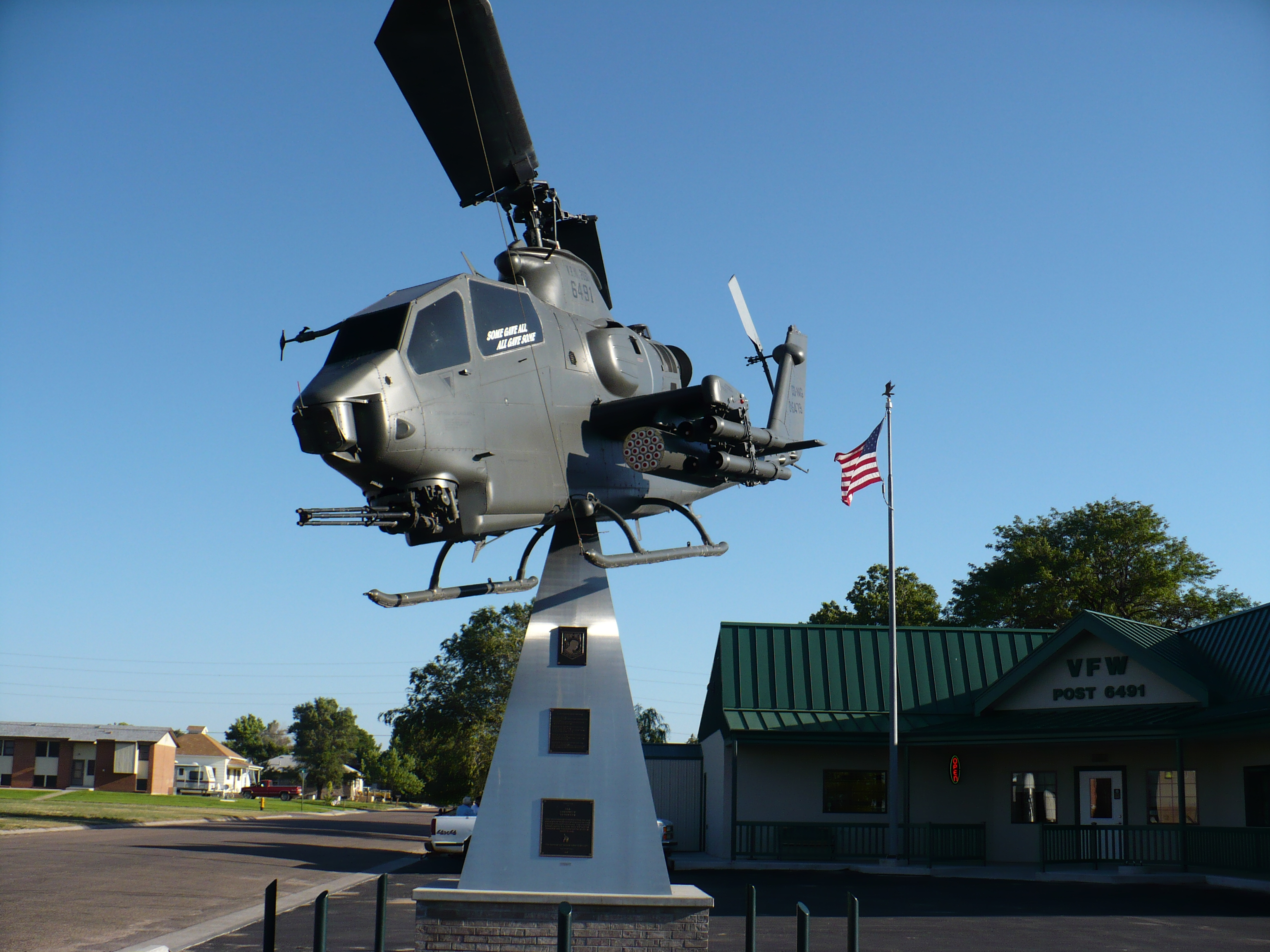
An AH-1 Cobra on display outside of the VFW Post in Burlington

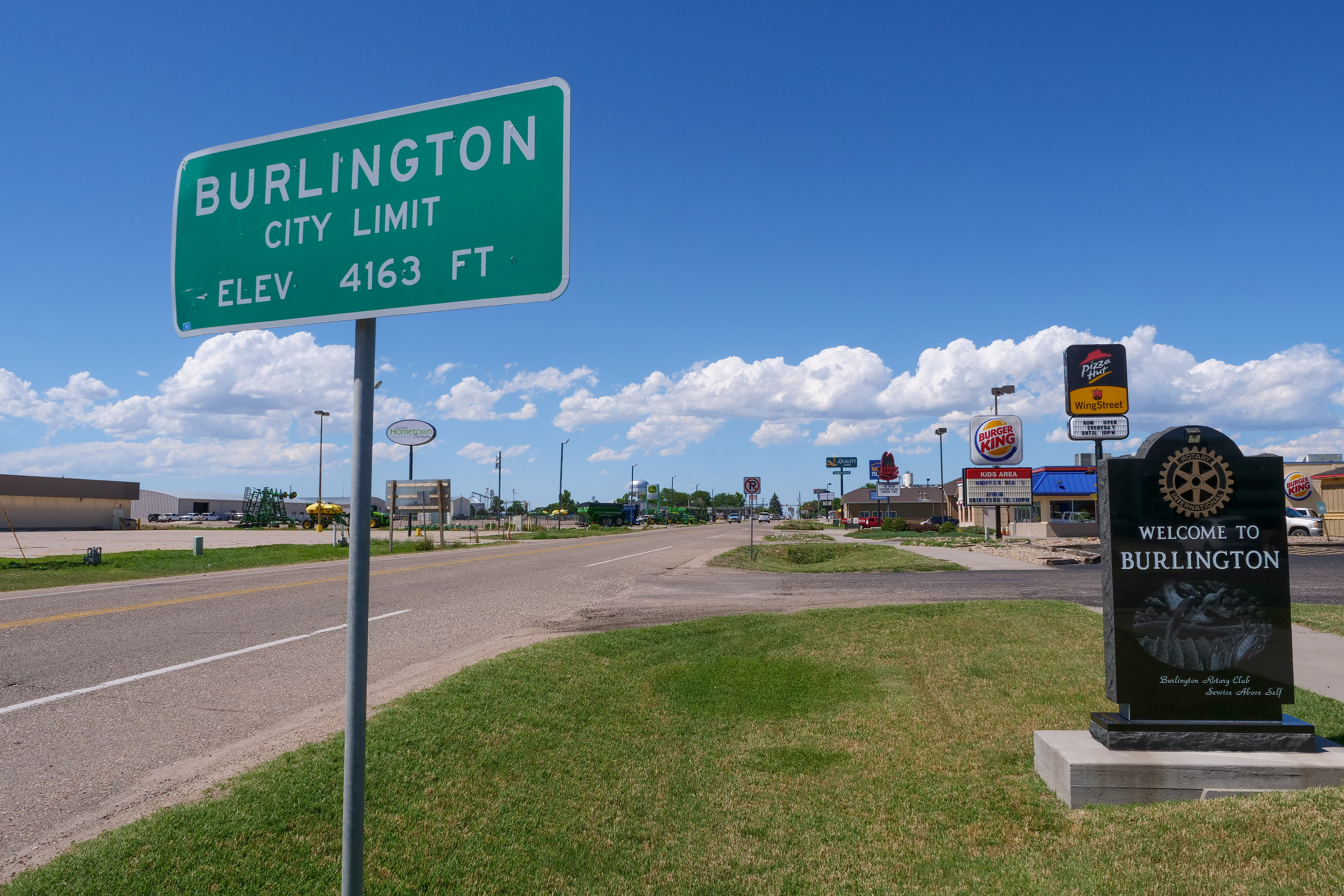
Burlington welcome sign

Burlington Public Schools are part of the Burlington Public School District RE-6J. The district has one elementary school, one middle school and one high school. Burlington also has several private schools.

Burlington Elementary School, Burlington Middle School and Burlington High School are located in Burlington.

Morgan Community College operates a regional center in Burlington, providing higher education services to Burlington and the nearby communities of Cheyenne Wells, Idalia, Joes, Seibert and Stratton.

== Media ==
=== Print ===
Burlington has a weekly newspaper, The Burlington Record. A run of 3 years, 1910–1912, of the Kit Carson County Record is archived in the Colorado Historic Newspapers Collection.

=== Radio ===
The following radio stations are licensed to Burlington:

AM

Frequency	Callsign	Format	Notes
1140	KNAB	Adult Standards/MOR	

FM

Frequency	Callsign	Format	Notes
88.1	K201FK	Christian	Translator of KAWZ, Twin Falls, Idaho
89.5	K208CH	Contemporary Christian	Translator of KTLF, Colorado Springs
104.1	KNAB-FM	Country	

== National Historic Landmark ==
- Kit Carson County Carousel (National Historic Landmark)

== Notable people ==
Notable individuals who were born in or have lived in Burlington include:

- Robert P. Kerr (1892–1960), film director, actor, screenwriter
- Mike Lounge (1946–2011), engineer, astronaut
- Beau McCoy (1980- ), Nebraska state legislator
- Susan Phillips (1949- ), Missouri state legislator

== See also ==
- Elitch Gardens Carousel
