= Stratton, Colorado =

Town in Kit Carson County, Colorado, United States

- Town
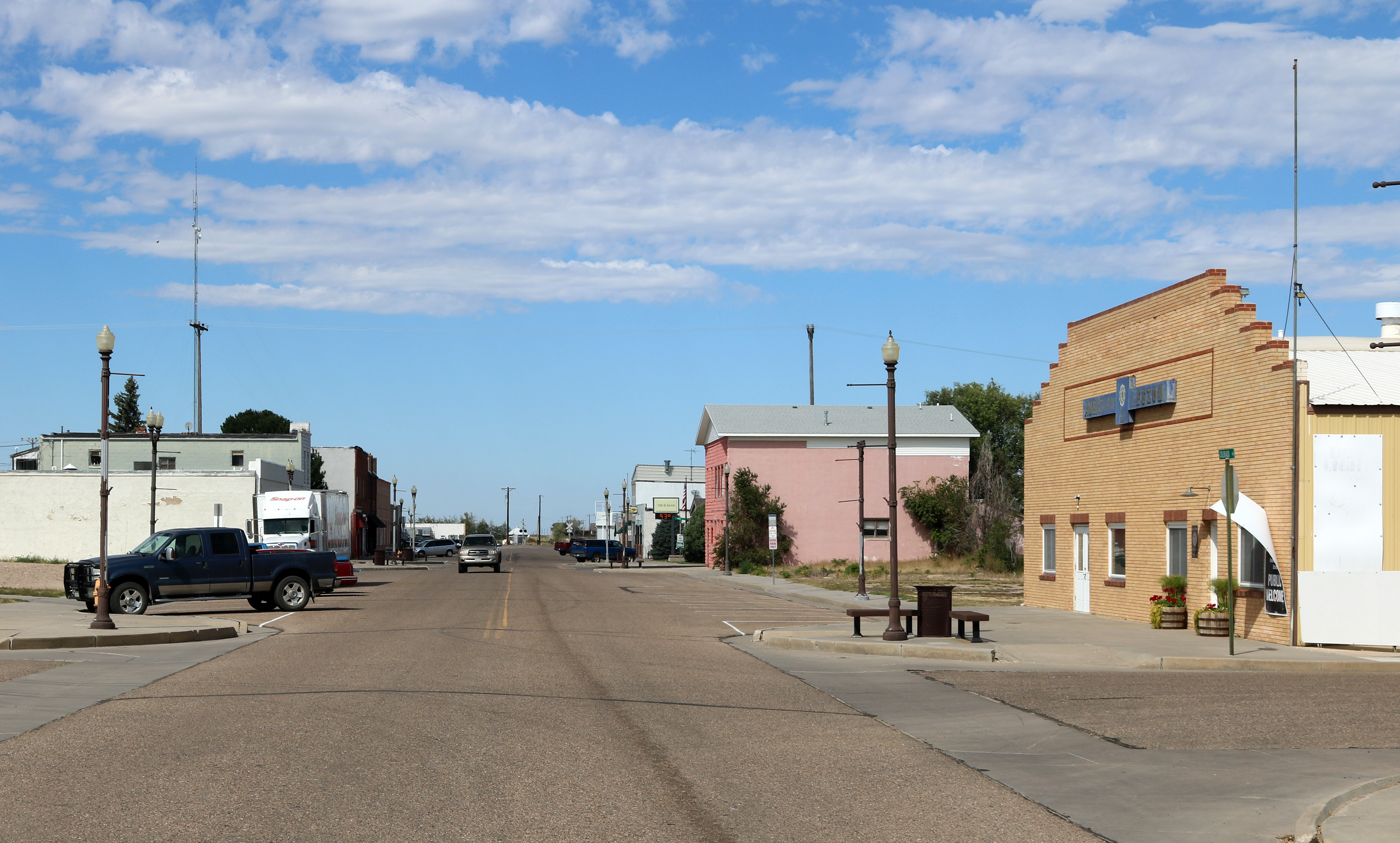
- Looking north along Colorado Avenue (2019)

- Location within Kit Carson County and Colorado
- Coordinates: 39°18′10″N 102°36′12″W
- Country: United States
- State: Colorado
- County: Kit Carson
- Incorporated: April 15, 1917

Government
  - Type: Statutory Town
  - Mayor: Matthew Brachtenbach

Area
  - Total: 0.51 sq mi (1.33 km^{2})
  - Land: 0.51 sq mi (1.33 km^{2})
  - Water: 0 sq mi (0.00 km^{2})
- Elevation: 4,413 ft (1,345 m)

Population (2020)
  - Total: 656
  - Density: 1,280/sq mi (493/km^{2})
- Time zone: UTC−7 (MST)
  - Summer (DST): UTC−6 (MDT)
- ZIP Code: 80836
- Area code: 719
- FIPS code: 08-74485
- GNIS ID: 204821
- Website: townofstratton.colorado.gov

Stratton is a statutory town in Kit Carson County, Colorado, United States. The population was 656 at the 2020 census. Stratton was named in honor of the gold miner and philanthropist Winfield Scott Stratton.

== Geography ==
According to the United States Census Bureau, the town has a total area of 0.5 square miles (1.3 km^{2}), all of it land.

=== Climate ===
Climate data for Stratton, Colorado, 1991–2020 normals, extremes 1934–2012
Month	Jan	Feb	Mar	Apr	May	Jun	Jul	Aug	Sep	Oct	Nov	Dec	Year
Record high °F (°C)	77 (25)	80 (27)	85 (29)	93 (34)	99 (37)	106 (41)	108 (42)	105 (41)	101 (38)	94 (34)	83 (28)	83 (28)	108 (42)
Mean maximum °F (°C)	66.3 (19.1)	67.4 (19.7)	78.3 (25.7)	84.8 (29.3)	90.3 (32.4)	98.0 (36.7)	101.0 (38.3)	98.3 (36.8)	94.6 (34.8)	86.2 (30.1)	75.0 (23.9)	66.4 (19.1)	101.5 (38.6)
Mean daily maximum °F (°C)	43.0 (6.1)	46.1 (7.8)	56.0 (13.3)	63.2 (17.3)	73.2 (22.9)	84.2 (29.0)	89.6 (32.0)	87.5 (30.8)	79.7 (26.5)	66.7 (19.3)	52.6 (11.4)	43.7 (6.5)	65.5 (18.6)
Daily mean °F (°C)	30.4 (−0.9)	32.8 (0.4)	41.3 (5.2)	48.5 (9.2)	58.8 (14.9)	69.6 (20.9)	75.1 (23.9)	73.3 (22.9)	64.7 (18.2)	51.8 (11.0)	39.5 (4.2)	31.3 (−0.4)	51.4 (10.8)
Mean daily minimum °F (°C)	17.7 (−7.9)	19.6 (−6.9)	26.5 (−3.1)	33.7 (0.9)	44.5 (6.9)	54.9 (12.7)	60.7 (15.9)	59.1 (15.1)	49.6 (9.8)	36.9 (2.7)	26.4 (−3.1)	18.8 (−7.3)	37.4 (3.0)
Mean minimum °F (°C)	−0.9 (−18.3)	−0.3 (−17.9)	9.0 (−12.8)	19.1 (−7.2)	30.7 (−0.7)	41.4 (5.2)	51.5 (10.8)	50.7 (10.4)	35.9 (2.2)	21.2 (−6.0)	9.9 (−12.3)	−0.3 (−17.9)	−9.0 (−22.8)
Record low °F (°C)	−22 (−30)	−26 (−32)	−19 (−28)	3 (−16)	16 (−9)	30 (−1)	40 (4)	40 (4)	20 (−7)	6 (−14)	−6 (−21)	−24 (−31)	−26 (−32)
Average precipitation inches (mm)	0.41 (10)	0.58 (15)	0.81 (21)	2.24 (57)	2.72 (69)	2.68 (68)	3.34 (85)	2.87 (73)	0.93 (24)	1.18 (30)	0.62 (16)	0.43 (11)	18.81 (479)
Average snowfall inches (cm)	4.1 (10)	5.2 (13)	6.0 (15)	5.6 (14)	0.0 (0.0)	0.0 (0.0)	0.0 (0.0)	0.0 (0.0)	0.4 (1.0)	2.7 (6.9)	6.1 (15)	3.8 (9.7)	33.9 (84.6)
Average precipitation days (≥ 0.01 in)	3.3	3.4	4.5	6.3	9.0	8.3	9.9	8.6	4.7	5.2	3.9	3.2	70.3
Average snowy days (≥ 0.1 in)	3.5	3.3	3.4	2.1	0.0	0.0	0.0	0.0	0.2	1.0	3.0	3.2	19.7
Source 1: NOAA
Source 2: National Weather Service (mean maxima/minima 1981–2010)

== Demographics ==
Historical population
Census	Pop.	Note	%±
1920	421		—
1930	507		20.4%
1940	623		22.9%
1950	720		15.6%
1960	680		−5.6%
1970	790		16.2%
1980	705		−10.8%
1990	649		−7.9%
2000	669		3.1%
2010	658		−1.6%
2020	656		−0.3%
U.S. Decennial Census

== Education ==
The community is served by Stratton Senior High School.

== Transportation ==
- Interstate 70
- U.S. Highway 24

== See also ==
- List of municipalities in Colorado
