= Kit Carson County, Colorado =

County in Colorado, United States

- County
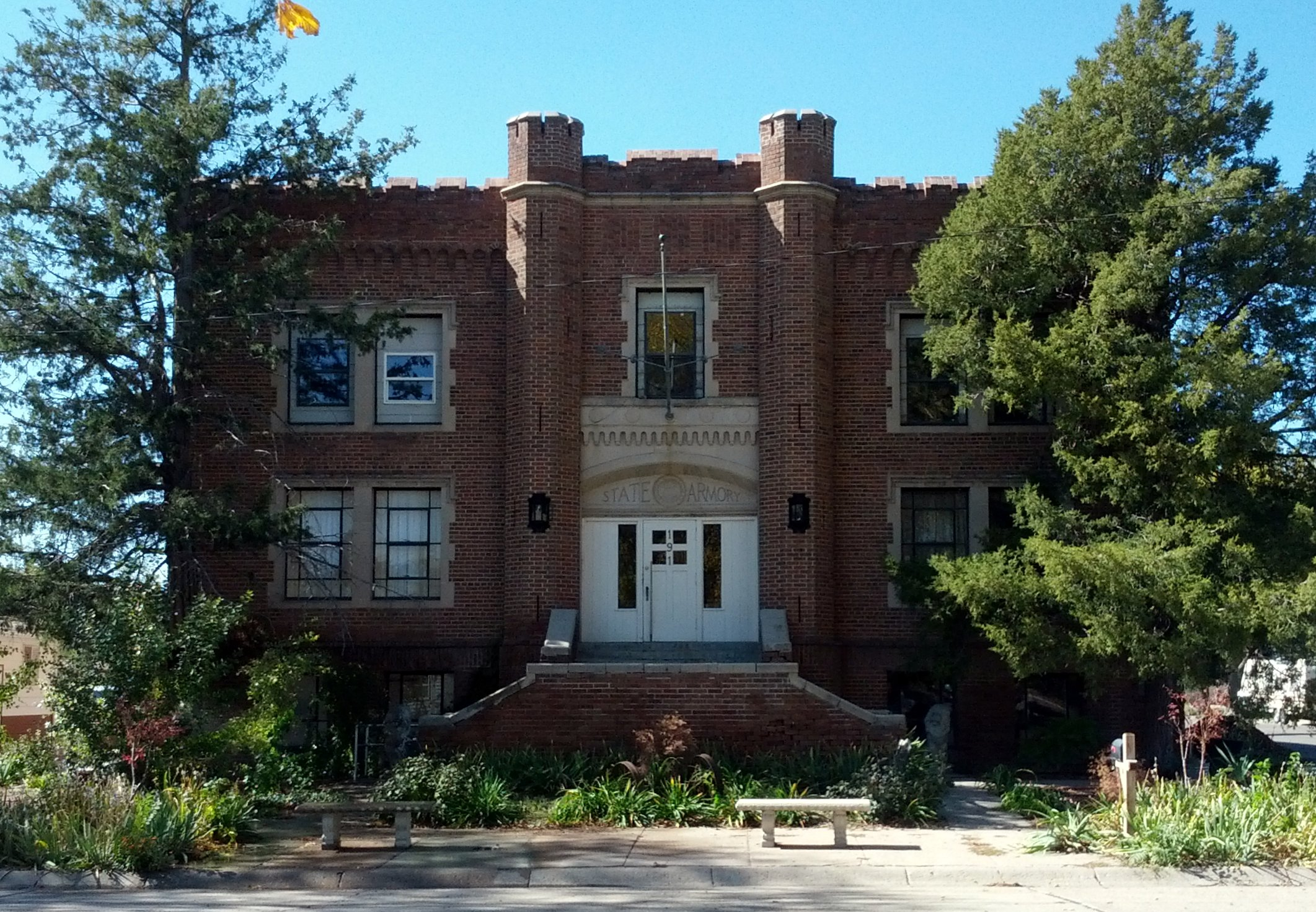
- Burlington State Armory in Burlington

- Location within the U.S. state of Colorado
- Coordinates: 39.31°N 102.60°W
- Country: United States
- State: Colorado
- Founded: April 11, 1889
- Named for: Kit Carson
- Seat: Burlington
- Largest city: Burlington

Area
  - Total: 2,162 sq mi (5,600 km^{2})
  - Land: 2,161 sq mi (5,600 km^{2})
  - Water: 0.9 sq mi (2.3 km^{2}) 0.04%

Population (2020)
  - Total: 7,087
  - Estimate (2025): 7,069 ▼
  - Density: 3.280/sq mi (1.266/km^{2})
- Time zone: UTC−7 (Mountain)
  - Summer (DST): UTC−6 (MDT)
- Congressional district: 4th
- Website: kitcarsoncounty.colorado.gov

Kit Carson County is a county located in the U.S. state of Colorado. As of the 2020 census, the population was 7,087. The county seat is Burlington. The county was established in 1889 and named for American frontiersman and Indian fighter Kit Carson.

== Geography ==
According to the U.S. Census Bureau, the county has a total area of 2,162 square miles (5,600 km^{2}), of which 2,161 square miles (5,600 km^{2}) is land and 0.9 square miles (2.3 km^{2}) (0.04%) is water.

=== Adjacent counties ===
- Yuma County (north)
- Cheyenne County, Kansas (northeast/Central Time border)
- Sherman County, Kansas (east)
- Wallace County, Kansas (southeast)
- Cheyenne County (south)
- Lincoln County (west)
- Washington County (northwest)

=== Major highways ===
- Interstate 70
- I-70 BS
- I-70 BL
- U.S. Highway 24
- U.S. Highway 385
- State Highway 59

== Demographics ==
Historical population
Census	Pop.	Note	%±
1890	2,472		—
1900	1,580		−36.1%
1910	7,483		373.6%
1920	8,915		19.1%
1930	9,725		9.1%
1940	7,512		−22.8%
1950	8,600		14.5%
1960	6,957		−19.1%
1970	7,530		8.2%
1980	7,599		0.9%
1990	7,140		−6.0%
2000	8,011		12.2%
2010	8,270		3.2%
2020	7,087		−14.3%
2025 (est.)	7,069	▼	−0.3%
U.S. Decennial Census; 1790-1960 1900-1990; 1990-2000 2010-2020

=== 2020 census ===
As of the 2020 census, the county had a population of 7,087. Of the residents, 25.1% were under the age of 18 and 19.3% were 65 years of age or older; the median age was 40.2 years. For every 100 females there were 101.6 males, and for every 100 females age 18 and over there were 98.5 males. 0.0% of residents lived in urban areas and 100.0% lived in rural areas.

Kit Carson County, Colorado – Racial and ethnic composition Note: the US Census treats Hispanic/Latino as an ethnic category. This table excludes Latinos from the racial categories and assigns them to a separate category. Hispanics/Latinos may be of any race.
Race / ethnicity (NH = Non-Hispanic)	Pop 2000	Pop 2010	Pop 2020	% 2000	% 2010	% 2020
White alone (NH)	6,678	6,320	5,306	83.36%	76.42%	74.87%
Black or African American alone (NH)	136	217	21	1.70%	2.62%	0.30%
Native American or Alaska Native alone (NH)	36	48	24	0.45%	0.58%	0.34%
Asian alone (NH)	26	34	30	0.32%	0.41%	0.42%
Pacific Islander alone (NH)	3	6	5	0.04%	0.07%	0.07%
Other race alone (NH)	4	3	32	0.05%	0.04%	0.45%
Mixed race or Multiracial (NH)	33	68	260	0.41%	0.82%	3.67%
Hispanic or Latino (any race)	1,095	1,574	1,409	13.67%	19.03%	19.88%
Total	8,011	8,270	7,087	100.00%	100.00%	100.00%

The racial makeup of the county was 79.7% White, 0.3% Black or African American, 0.6% American Indian and Alaska Native, 0.4% Asian, 0.1% Native Hawaiian and Pacific Islander, 8.6% from some other race, and 10.1% from two or more races. Hispanic or Latino residents of any race comprised 19.9% of the population.

There were 2,893 households in the county, of which 30.5% had children under the age of 18 living with them and 21.9% had a female householder with no spouse or partner present. About 29.5% of all households were made up of individuals and 13.2% had someone living alone who was 65 years of age or older.

There were 3,410 housing units, of which 15.2% were vacant. Among occupied housing units, 70.2% were owner-occupied and 29.8% were renter-occupied. The homeowner vacancy rate was 1.5% and the rental vacancy rate was 16.3%.

=== 2000 census ===
At the 2000 census there were 8,011 people, 2,990 households, and 2,081 families living in the county. The population density was 4 people per square mile (1.5 people/km^{2}). There were 3,430 housing units at an average density of 2 units per square mile (0.77 units/km^{2}). The racial makeup of the county was 87.28% White, 1.74% Black or African American, 0.51% Native American, 0.32% Asian, 0.04% Pacific Islander, 9.20% from other races, and 0.91% from two or more races. 13.67% of the population were Hispanic or Latino of any race. Of the 2,990 households 33.60% had children under the age of 18 living with them, 59.40% were married couples living together, 6.30% had a female householder with no husband present, and 30.40% were non-families. 27.20% of households were one person and 12.50% were one person aged 65 or older. The average household size was 2.50 and the average family size was 3.07.

The age distribution was 26.70% under the age of 18, 7.50% from 18 to 24, 29.00% from 25 to 44, 22.20% from 45 to 64, and 14.60% 65 or older. The median age was 37 years. For every 100 females there were 112.20 males. For every 100 females age 18 and over, there were 112.10 males.

The median household income was $33,152 and the median family income was $41,867. Males had a median income of $28,700 versus $19,978 for females. The per capita income for the county was $16,964. About 9.40% of families and 12.10% of the population were below the poverty line, including 16.60% of those under age 18 and 11.10% of those age 65 or over.

== Politics ==
United States presidential election results for Kit Carson County, Colorado
Year	Republican		Democratic		Third party(ies)	
Year	No.	%	No.	%	No.	%
1892	277	54.10%	0	0.00%	235	45.90%
1896	252	51.12%	229	46.45%	12	2.43%
1900	384	58.36%	259	39.36%	15	2.28%
1904	514	66.67%	219	28.40%	38	4.93%
1908	983	54.10%	752	41.39%	82	4.51%
1912	569	25.08%	719	31.69%	981	43.23%
1916	1,030	37.06%	1,571	56.53%	178	6.41%
1920	1,872	65.48%	796	27.84%	191	6.68%
1924	2,108	60.21%	720	20.57%	673	19.22%
1928	2,486	67.37%	1,137	30.81%	67	1.82%
1932	1,835	42.55%	2,289	53.07%	189	4.38%
1936	1,980	50.76%	1,730	44.35%	191	4.90%
1940	2,481	68.69%	1,100	30.45%	31	0.86%
1944	2,471	72.27%	937	27.41%	11	0.32%
1948	1,873	58.88%	1,281	40.27%	27	0.85%
1952	2,511	71.03%	998	28.23%	26	0.74%
1956	2,243	70.96%	911	28.82%	7	0.22%
1960	2,248	66.88%	1,103	32.82%	10	0.30%
1964	1,316	40.71%	1,906	58.95%	11	0.34%
1968	1,977	61.08%	1,026	31.70%	234	7.23%
1972	2,316	70.89%	824	25.22%	127	3.89%
1976	1,888	52.28%	1,647	45.61%	76	2.10%
1980	2,622	71.78%	790	21.63%	241	6.60%
1984	2,762	77.06%	778	21.71%	44	1.23%
1988	2,262	64.41%	1,196	34.05%	54	1.54%
1992	1,801	49.23%	925	25.29%	932	25.48%
1996	2,068	60.26%	1,073	31.26%	291	8.48%
2000	2,542	73.51%	809	23.40%	107	3.09%
2004	2,721	77.70%	729	20.82%	52	1.48%
2008	2,455	71.32%	912	26.50%	75	2.18%
2012	2,785	75.23%	838	22.64%	79	2.13%
2016	2,967	80.15%	536	14.48%	199	5.38%
2020	3,144	81.22%	662	17.10%	65	1.68%
2024	3,083	83.37%	556	15.04%	59	1.60%

United States Senate election results for Kit Carson County, Colorado2
Year	Republican		Democratic		Third party(ies)	
Year	No.	%	No.	%	No.	%
2020	3,138	82.25%	628	16.46%	49	1.28%

United States Senate election results for Kit Carson County, Colorado3
Year	Republican		Democratic		Third party(ies)	
Year	No.	%	No.	%	No.	%
2022	2,408	79.52%	531	17.54%	89	2.94%

Colorado Gubernatorial election results for Kit Carson County
Year	Republican		Democratic		Third party(ies)	
Year	No.	%	No.	%	No.	%
2022	2,465	81.46%	475	15.70%	86	2.84%

Like all the High Plains, Kit Carson County is powerfully Republican. Since 1920, it has been won only twice by a Democratic presidential candidate – during the landslides of 1932 and 1964. Along with Elbert County and Rio Blanco County, it was one of three Colorado counties to be won by Alf Landon in 1936. The Republican leaning in the county has increased in recent elections, with Donald Trump performing better in 2016 than any Republican in county history. He surpassed this record in 2020, and again in 2024.

In other statewide elections, Kit Carson County also leans strongly Republican. At a gubernatorial level, it has been won by Democrat Roy Romer in 1990 – when he carried all but four counties statewide – and by Constitution Party candidate Tom Tancredo in 2010.

== Recreation ==
=== National historic landmark ===
- Philadelphia Toboggan Company Carousel #6, National Historic Landmark

=== Historic trail ===
- Smoky Hill Trail

== Communities ==
=== City ===
- Burlington

=== Towns ===
- Bethune
- Flagler
- Seibert
- Stratton
- Vona

== See also ==
- National Register of Historic Places listings in Kit Carson County, Colorado
- List of counties in Colorado
