= Argentine Pass =

Mountain pass in Colorado, USA

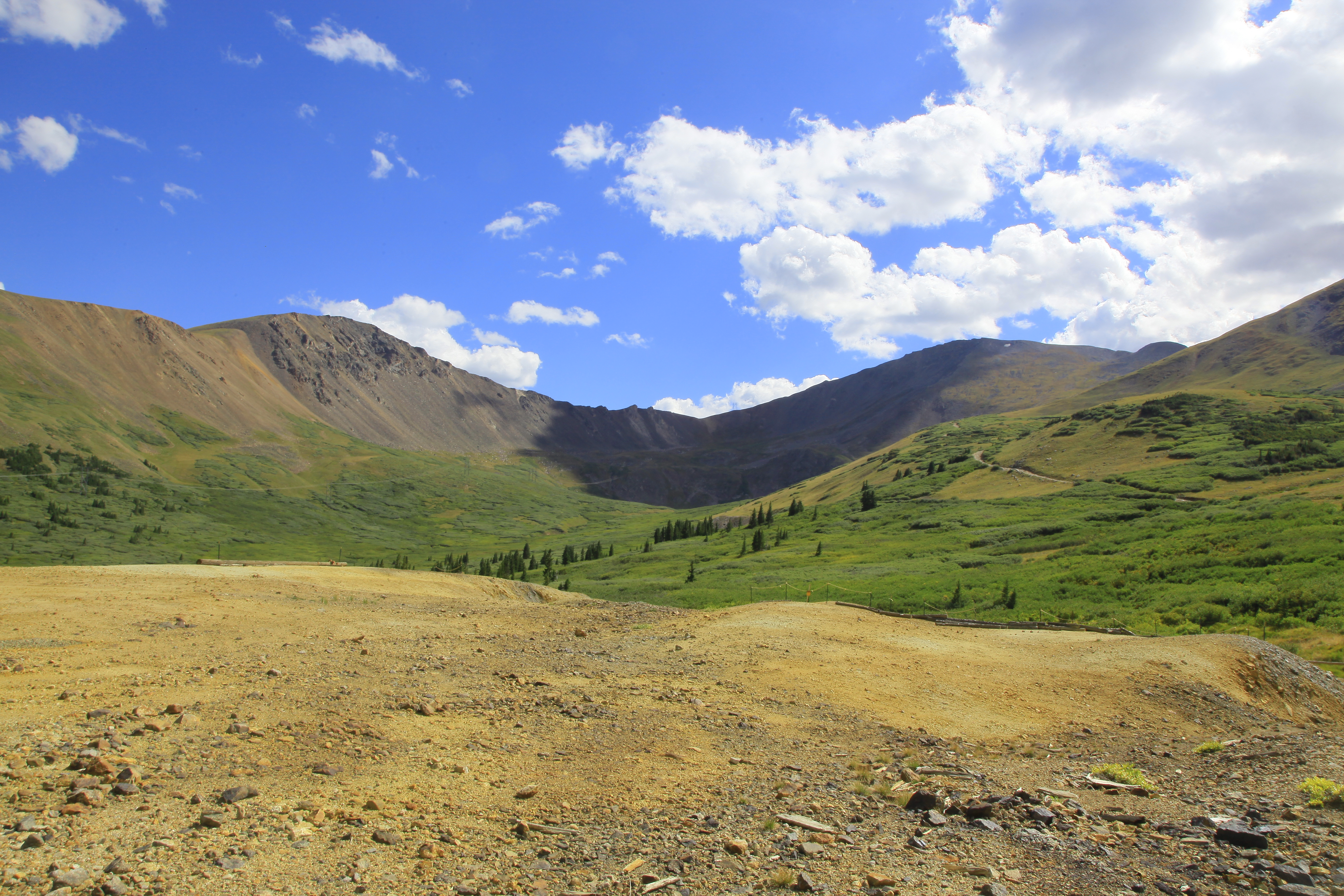
- The mountains along Argentine Pass as seen from the ghost town of Waldorf, in September 2022.
- Interactive map of Argentine Pass
- Elevation: 13,207 ft (4,025 m)
- Traversed by: Unimproved road

Third Approach
- Location: Clear Creek / Summit counties, Colorado, U.S.
- Range: Front Range
- Coordinates: 39°37′31″N 105°46′57″W
- Topo map: USGS Grays Peak

Argentine Pass, elevation 13,207 ft (4,025 m), is a high mountain pass that crosses the Continental Divide in the Front Range of the Rocky Mountains of central Colorado in the United States. Argentine Pass is located on the crest of the Front Range along the boundary southwest of Georgetown and is the highest named vehicle-accessible pass in the state.

Some early references use other names for the pass. An 1867 description of the trip from Georgetown into the valley of the Snake River refers to it as Sanderson Pass. A lithograph caption from 1869 calls it the Snake River Pass.

== Geography ==
Argentine Pass is 0.94 miles (1.51 km) north of Argentine Peak and 0.95 miles (1.53 km) southwest of Mount Edwards. To the east is the valley of Leavenworth Creek, a tributary that joins the South Clear Creek south of Georgetown. To the west is the Horseshoe Basin, a deep glacial cirque at the head of the Peru Creek, a tributary that joins the Snake River just north of Montezuma.

The continental divide at Argentine Pass serves as the boundary between Clear Creek and Summit counties.

The pass was formerly used by a toll road and stagecoach route. The trail on the west side of the pass is the remains of this road. To the east, the Argentine Central Railway ran from Georgetown to the pass from 1906 to 1918. The Jeep trail to the pass follows the grade of this abandoned railroad.

== History ==
On September 14, 1864, former provisional territorial governor Robert Steele, along with James Huff and Robert Layton, discovered silver high on the slopes of McClellan Mountain, 1.85 mi (2.97 km) north of what we now call Argentine Pass. The mountains of this region are predominantly granite and gneiss, with veins containing silver-rich galena and blende (sphalerite), as well as iron pyrite, cupriferous pyrite (chalcopyrite), and some tetrahedrite. This was the first major discovery of silver ore in Colorado. They named the deposit the Belmont Lode (from the French for "beautiful mountain"), and the surrounding area came to be known as the Argentine mining district (from argentum, Latin for silver). The discovery led to the growth of Georgetown as an early center of the silver mining industry in Colorado, although development was slowed by a general ignorance of how to properly treat the ore, by the high cost of transportation from the mines, and by the climate at that altitude. Eventually, both sides of the pass were heavily mined, and the district was divided into the East Argentine and West Argentine Districts, joined by the pass. Many remains of mining activity remain visible today.

Work began on a toll road over Argentine Pass in 1869; the toll was typically one dollar for a team and wagon. In 1883, the road was purchased by Clear Creek County and Summit County as a public highway; in the same year, the Denver, South Park and Pacific Railroad reached Dillon, diverting most of the freight traffic from the toll road. The stagecoach fare from Georgetown to Chihuahua, 15 miles (24 km) away by road over the pass, was $2.50 in 1885. Under county management, the road was never well maintained, and it gradually became impassable to teams and wagons. The town of Waldorf was established as a rest stop on the east side of the pass.

In 1875, the Hayden Survey reported the Argentine Pass wagon road to be the highest wagon road in Colorado; at the time, it was the primary route from Georgetown to the mining camps in the Blue River Valley (Breckenridge and Montezuma).

Colorado Telephone laid the first telephone line across Argentine Pass in 1899; this was a twisted-pair line resting directly on the ground, but it was replaced a year later with submarine cable. The cable, which carried six toll lines, required intensive maintenance and was entirely replaced three times before its use was abandoned in 1909. Conies (pikas) chewing on the line caused major damage, as did rock slides. From 1909 to 1916, twisted pair lines were used again, with annual replacement. Finally, in the summer of 1916, Mountain States Telephone & Telegraph Company installed a heavily engineered overhead line, hauling supplies by rail to Waldorf and then onward by pack train. This line, only 1.3 miles (2.1 km) long, cost more than 7 miles (11 km) of a comparable line in more forgiving territory; the cost was justified because it was the only telephone connection from Denver to Leadville and the western half of the state.

In mid 1909, the Central Colorado Power Co. began delivering power over the Shoshone Transmission Line from Glenwood Springs to Denver. This three-phase 90 kV line was split into two parallel lines as much as one mile (1.6 km) apart for the 3-mile (4.8 km) segment that crossed Argentine Pass from below Waldorf in the east to Argentine in the west (both are ghost towns today). As currently routed, this line crosses the Continental Divide 1.25 miles (2.01 km) south of Argentine Pass, just south of Argentine Peak.

The Vidler Tunnel under Argentine Pass began with the Horseshoe tunnel, a silver mine. Reese Vidler purchased the mine in 1902 with a plan to extend it under the Continental Divide as a railroad tunnel. Tunneling progressed about 700 feet (210 m) from the west portal and 5,110 feet (1,560 m) from the east portal before work stopped in 1911 (after several changes in ownership). In 1952, Herbert T. Young purchased the unfinished tunnel, along with water rights on the west side of the divide, intending to finish the tunnel as a water tunnel. The 1.4-mile (2.3 km) tunnel was completed in late 1968, and is currently owned by the City of Golden. In 2007, major repairs were completed to the east portal and the mined-out area of the Flossie Vein. This water diversion project has a capacity of 31.5 cubic feet per second (0.89 m^{3}/s) with an average annual diversion of around 650 acre-feet (802,000 m^{3}).

== Climate ==
The peak wind speed recorded at the pass as of 1912 was 165 miles per hour (266 km/h), at which point the measuring equipment was blown away. Temperatures as low as −59 °F (−51 °C) were recorded, along with snow drifts as deep as 30 feet (9 m) and persisting until August. This climate data appears to have been taken by the builders of the Shoshone Transmission Line.

== The road today ==
Vehicle travel is only possible on the Georgetown side of the pass during the summer months by a four-wheel drive vehicle with high-clearance. The trail on the Horseshoe Basin side is only accessible by foot or by mountain bike. The pass is the highest point on the American Discovery Trail.
