= Snake River Falls (Colorado) =

Waterfall in Colorado, US

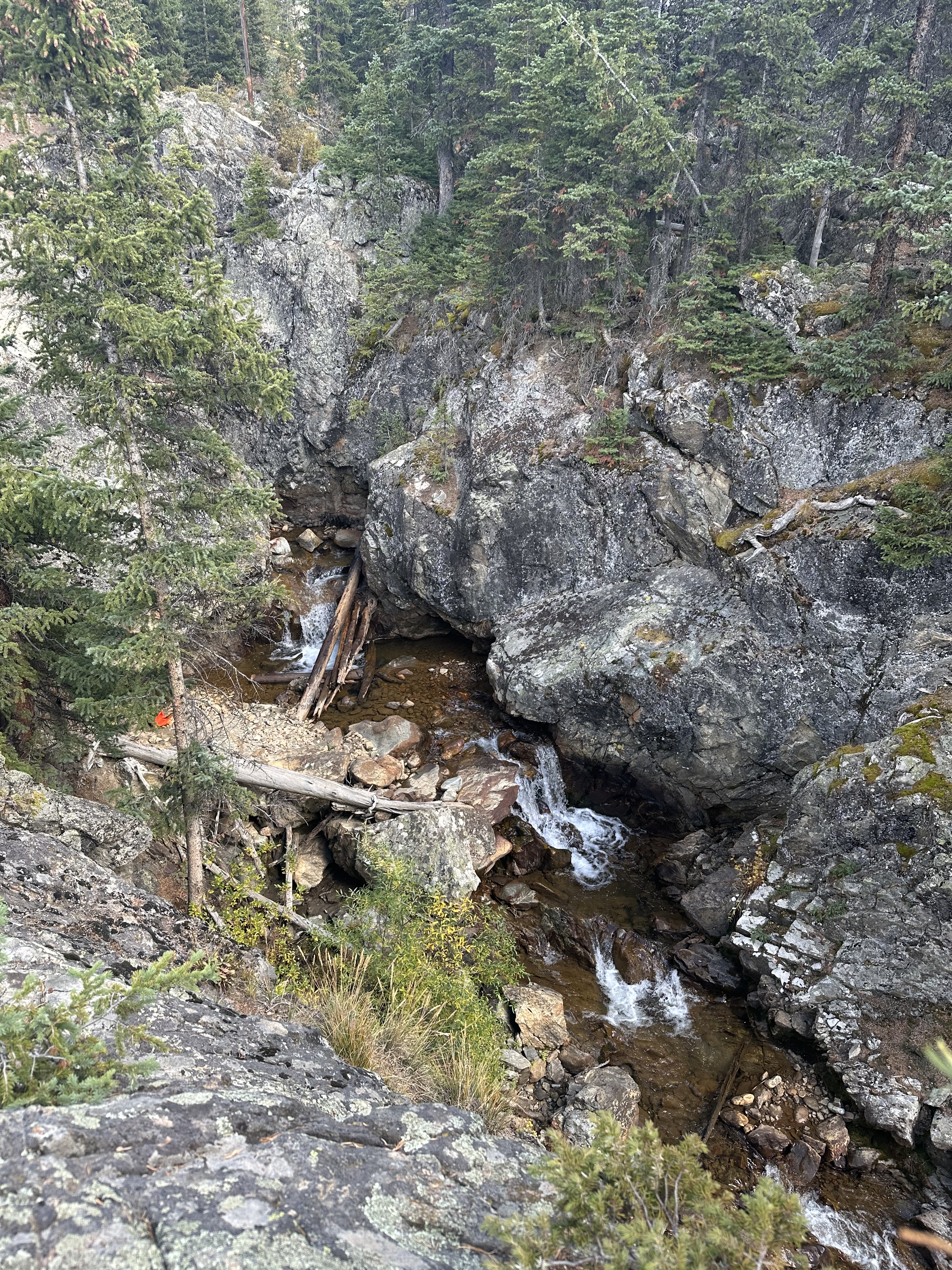

- Location within Colorado
- Coordinates: 39°38′25″N 105°52′54″W
- Elevation: 10,571 ft (3,222 m)
- Watercourse: North Fork Snake River

Snake River Falls is a waterfall located west of Arapahoe Basin on the North Fork Snake River.
