= Lenawee Mountain =

Mountain in Colorado, United States

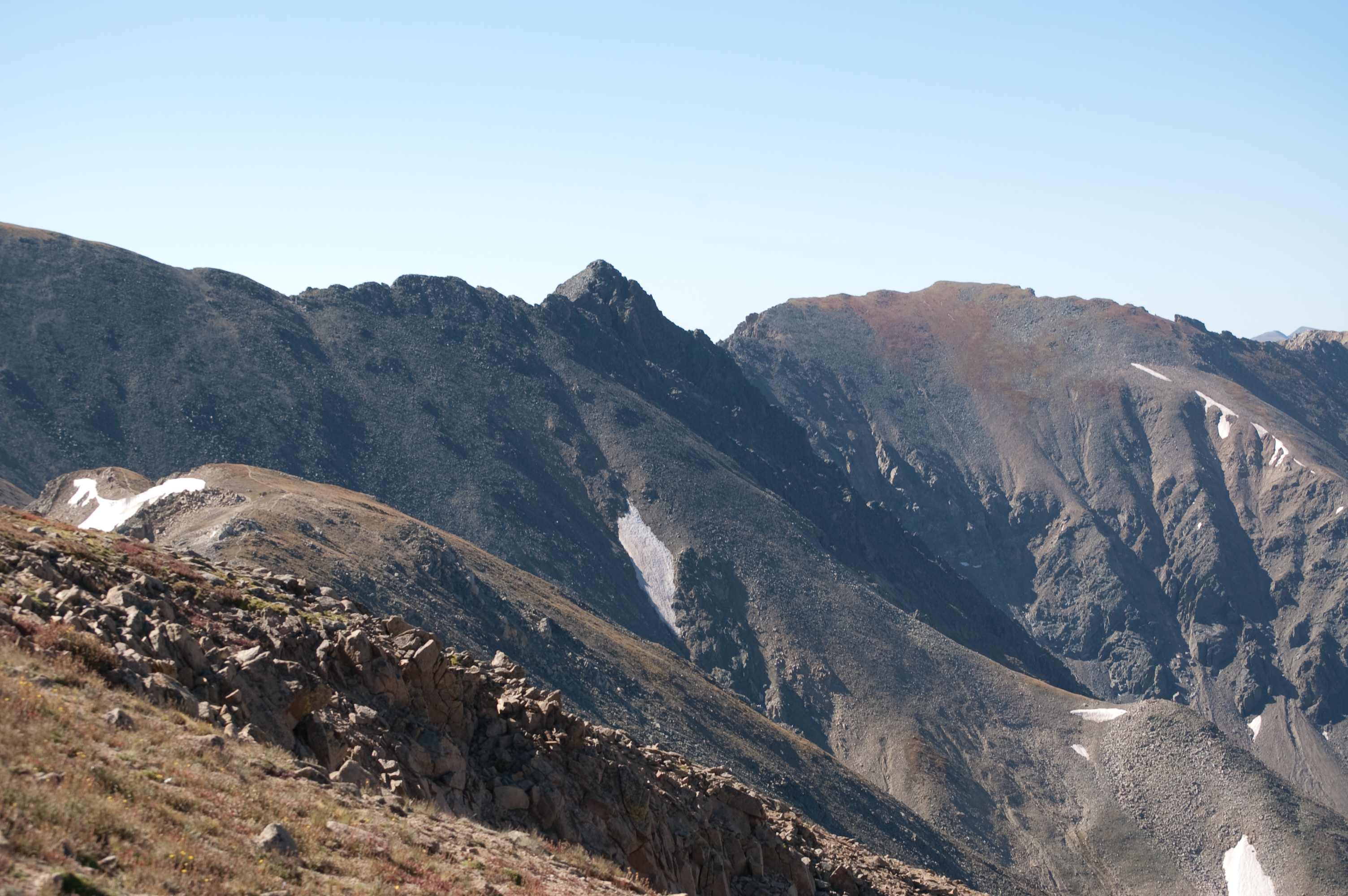

Highest point
- Elevation: 13,186 ft (4,019 m)
- Coordinates: 39°37′48″N 105°51′20″W, 39°37′28″N 105°52′11″W

Geography
- Location within Colorado
- Location: Dillon, Summit County, Colorado, U.S.
- Topo map: USGS Grays Peak

Lenawee Mountain is a mountain east of Dillon in Summit County, Colorado. Porcupine Peak lies west of Lenawee Mountain and Grizzly Peak is located northeast. The Arapahoe Basin ski area is located on a portion of the mountain.
