= Porcupine Peak =

Mountain in Colorado, United States

- Location within Colorado

Highest point
- Elevation: 11,798 ft (3,596 m)
- Coordinates: 39°37′01″N 105°53′55″W

Geography
- Location: Dillon, Summit County, Colorado, U.S.
- Topo map: USGS Keystone

Porcupine Peak is a mountain east of Dillon in Summit County, Colorado. Located east of Porcupine Peak is Lenawee Mountain and Independence Mountain and Bear Mountain is located south.
