= Frisco Bay =

Frisco Bay can refer to:

- Frisco Bay, Dillon Reservoir, Colorado
- San Francisco Bay, California
