= Shoshone Transmission Line =

Electric power transmission line

The Shoshone Transmission Line was an early and notable electric power transmission line, now recorded on the List of IEEE Milestones. The line takes its name from the power plant at its west end which generates hydroelectric power below the Shoshone Rapids in Glenwood Canyon.

The line began service on July 17, 1909, conveying power from the 15 MW Shoshone Generating Station, outside of Glenwood Springs to Denver, serving substations in Leadville, Dillon and Idaho Springs. At the east end of the line, it was connected to the utility's Boulder Canyon Hydroelectric Plant powered from the Barker Meadow Reservoir. In the event of a break in the line, either power plant could supply customers along the line.

As originally built, the line was 153.4 miles (246.9 km) long, crossing the Continental Divide at Hagerman Pass (at altitude 12,055 feet or 3,674 m), Fremont Pass (at altitude 11,346 feet or 3,458 m) and Argentine Pass (at altitude 13,532 feet or 4,125 m). For many years, this was the highest electric power transmission line in the world. The three-phase line operated at 90 kV and was supported 1400 steel towers 44 feet (13 m) high on an average spacing of 730 feet (220 m) .

A secondary power line from the backbone of the Shoshone line connected it to a steam generating station at Leadville, as well as to many of the mines in the Leadville region. At Dillon, a secondary line served the numerous gold dredges of the Breckenridge placer mining district. Connections were also made to smaller hydroelectric plants at Dillon and Idaho Springs.

In 1951 and 1952, the Public Service Company of Colorado replaced the hemp-cored 6-strand copper cable on the Shoshone line with steel-core aluminum cable. By this time, the Shoshone generating station had been upgraded to 14.4 MW. New towers were installed in the 1970s, with some changes in the path of the line.

The severe climate and mountain terrain along the line are a challenge. Within a few years of construction, sleet buildups of as much a 6 inches (15 cm) had been observed on wires along the line. Several towers were buckled and demolished by wind force alone—wind speeds of over 165 miles per hour (266 km/h) were measured at one point along the line, leading to metal fatigue at the points where insulators support the power line. In the vicinity of the high passes, snow depths as great as 35 feet (11 m) have been measured. Avalanches along the line have been known to damage multiple transmission towers in remote locations.

The IEEE has honored the line for its length, and for deployment in difficult terrain and unusually harsh weather patterns.
