= J. Luther Mauney =

American Lutheran bishop (1907–1990)

The Reverend Dr J. Luther Mauney
- President (Bishop)
- Church: Lutheran Church in America
- Diocese: Virginia Synod
- Elected: 1948
- In office: 1948–1976
- Successor: The Reverend Virgil (Buck) Moyer

Orders
- Ordination: 1934 by North Carolina Synod, United Lutheran Church in America

Personal details
- Born: May 27, 1907
- Died: January 29, 1990

The Reverend Dr Jacob Luther Mauney (May 22, 1907 – January 29, 1990) was an American Lutheran pastor who served as President (Bishop) of the Virginia Synod from 1948 to 1976.

== Biography ==
Mauney was born on May 22, 1907, to The Reverend John David and Bessie Miller Frantz Mauney. Mauney's father, Pastor John D. Mauney (1878–1947), served Lutheran congregations in the Carolinas and was a professor at Lenoir-Rhyne College.

Mauney was ordained on May 24, 1934, with a Bachelor of Divinity from Southern Seminary, and earned a Doctor of Divinity from Lenoir-Rhyne in 1948. He married Ruth Boger Barrier on September 3, 1935, and served a variety of congregations in Virginia. Mauney served as President of the Virginia Council of Churches, and on the boards of Southern Seminary and of Virginia Lutheran Homes. He served on the Parish Education Board of the United Lutheran Church in America and on the Pensions Board and the Court of Adjudication of the Lutheran Church in America. He was on the boards of Roanoke College, Marion College, Emory and Henry College, the Lutheran Children's Home, the National Lutheran Home, and the Virginia Synod Executive Council.

He was named President Emeritus of the Virginia Synod upon his retirement in 1976, and died on January 29, 1990.
