= Richard F. Bansemer =

American Lutheran pastor (born 1940)

The Reverend Richard F. Bansemer
- Bishop
- Church: Evangelical Lutheran Church in America
- Diocese: Virginia Synod
- Elected: 1987
- In office: 1987–1999
- Predecessor: The Reverend Buck Moyer
- Successor: The Reverend James F. Mauney

Orders
- Ordination: 1966 by Florida Synod, Lutheran Church in America

Personal details
- Born: May 26, 1940

The Reverend Richard F. Bansemer (born May 26, 1940) is a Lutheran pastor who served as Bishop of the Virginia Synod from 1987-1999. Richard F. Bansemer was born to Reinhold Matthias and Oralee Ann Brierly Bansemer.

Bansemer was ordained in 1966, with a Bachelor of Divinity from Southern Seminary. He holds honorary Doctor of Divinity Degrees from Roanoke College in Salem, Virginia, and from Newberry College, Newberry, South Carolina. He married Miss Mary Ann Troutman in 1971. The Reverend Bansemer served University Lutheran in Gainesville Florida (1966-1968), and then St. John parish in Roanoke from 1968-1973, and was then called to serve as pastor and mission developer of Lord of the Mountains Lutheran in Dillon, Colorado. From 1978-1987 he served Rural Retreat Parish (Grace and St. Paul) in Rural Retreat, Virginia, and then served as Bishop of the Virginia Synod from 1987 until his retirement in 1999.
