= Arapahoe Basin =

Ski area in Colorado, USA

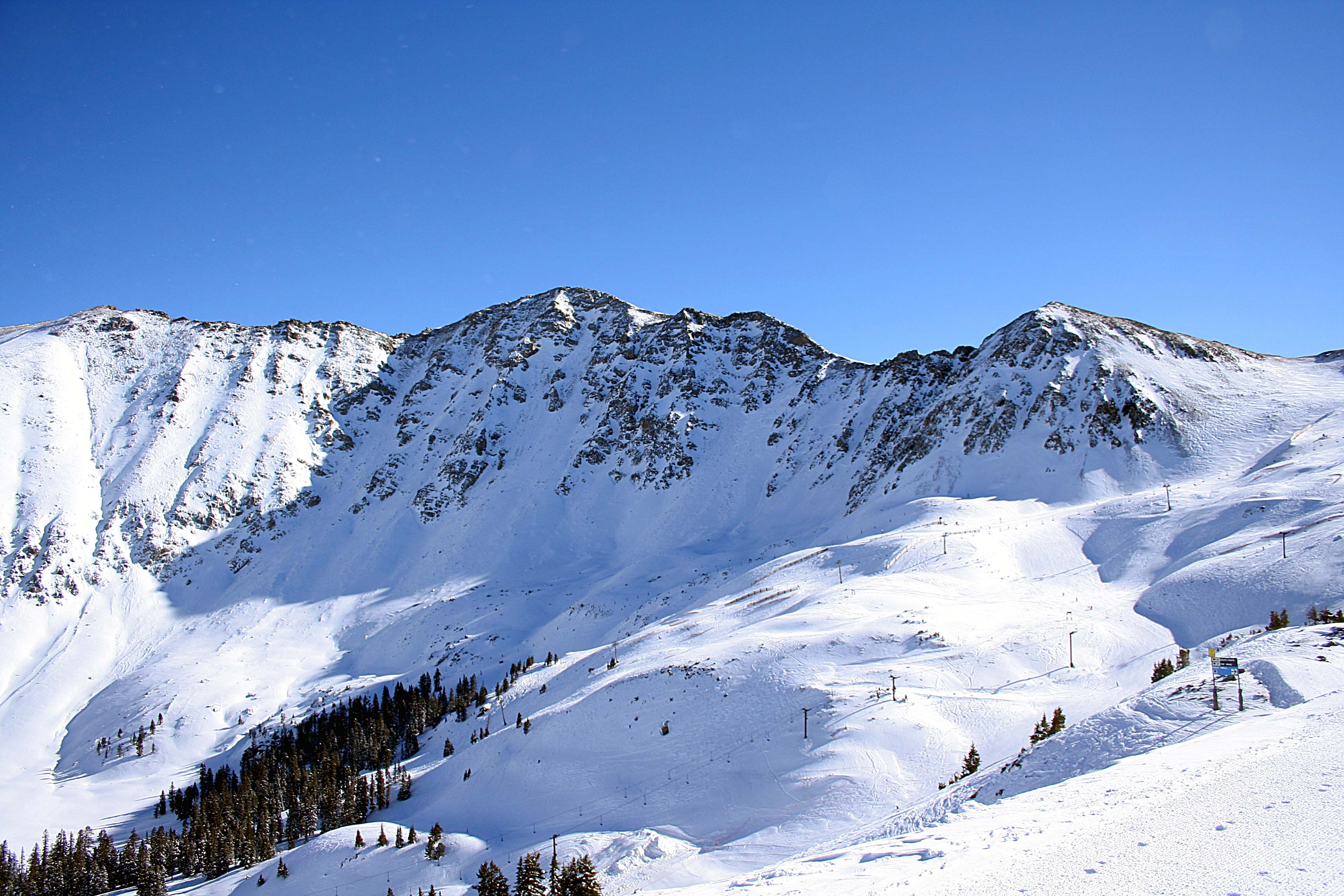
- Arapahoe Basin's East Wall in December 2005

- Location in Colorado Arapahoe Basin (the United States)
- Location: White River National Forest; Summit County, Colorado, U.S.
- Nearest city: Keystone; Denver: 6 miles (10 km)
- Coordinates: 39°38′30″N 105°52′18″W
- Owner: Alterra Mountain Company
- Vertical: 2,530 ft (771 m)
- Top elevation: 13,050 ft (3,978 m)
- Base elevation: 10,780 ft (3,286 m)
- Skiable area: 1,428 acres (5.78 km^{2})
- Trails: 145 : 7% Easiest : 20% More Difficult : 49% Most Difficult : 24% Extreme
- Longest run: 1.5 miles (2.4 km)
- Lift system: 6 chairs (1 high-speed six pack, 1 high speed quad, 3 fixed grip quads, 1 double), 2 magic carpets and 1 surface lift
- Terrain parks: None
- Snowfall: 350 in (890 cm)
- Snowmaking: 125 acres (0.51 km^{2})
- Night skiing: No
- Website: arapahoebasin.com

Arapahoe Basin (/əˈræpəhoʊ/ ə-RAP-ə-hoh; often shortened to A-Basin, or simply The Basin) is an alpine ski area in the Rocky Mountains of the United States, in the Arapaho National Forest of Colorado. Arapahoe Basin is known for its extended season and its extreme terrain. Arapahoe Basin is located south of Loveland Pass on U.S. Highway 6 in Summit County. The resort's terrain spans over 1,400 acres, serving up a mix of groomed runs, moguls, cornices, and glades. It features a lift-served vertical drop of 2,270 feet and is served by nine lifts, with easy access to 145 trails. Additionally, there is a significant amount of hike-to terrain which expands the in-bounds area appeal. There is also an abundance of non-winter activities available.

== Geography and climate ==
The Arapahoe Basin East Wall has a summit elevation of 13,050 feet (3,978 m), which is among the highest in-bounds skiable terrain in North America. Due to its high elevation and its mostly north-to-northeast face, the Basin's ski season is much longer than most resorts in North America. It continues to run lifts until June, sometimes lasting well into the summer, and since snowmaking was installed in 2002 it often begins its ski operations in mid-October. Its earliest opening on record was October 9, 2009, and its latest was August 10, 1995.

Arapahoe Basin is located just below Loveland Pass and offers views of the Continental Divide (which it borders) from the lifts. From the top of the ski area there are views of Lake Dillon, Breckenridge, Keystone, Montezuma, and Loveland Pass.

The Basin is located about 68 miles (109 km) west of Denver.

== Ski area information ==
=== Lodges/Restaurants ===
A-Basin has five day lodges. At the base is the "6th Alley", a year-round, day and evening restaurant/bar with indoor and outdoor dining on a two-story deck. Also, is the "Legends Cafe", a breakfast or lunch cafeteria. The "Black Mountain Lodge" sits mid-mountain, at the top of the Black Mountain Express, serving Barbecue and a day lodge style menu. "Il Rifugio" at 12,456 feet, is the highest-elevation restaurant in North America, offering a European-style bistro specializing in wine and charcuterie pairings featuring both imported and local-to-Colorado meats and cheeses. Near the top of Lenawee Lift, "Steilhang Hut" is Arapahoe Basin's newest on-mountain restaurant, serving Colorado-made specialty sausages, Colorado-brewed German draft beer, soft pretzels, and strudel made by a local Denver bakery.

There is no overnight lodging at Arapahoe Basin. The nearest lodging is located at the Keystone ski area, six miles to the west. Arapahoe Basin is also a short drive from several other towns including Breckenridge, Frisco, Dillon, Silverthorne, Silver Plume, and Georgetown.

=== Terrain services ===
Arapahoe Basin is mostly known for advanced and expert terrain, but also has runs for the novice and intermediate skier, as well as a children's program. The Black Mountain Express, Molly Hogan, and Pika Place & Hogan's Magic Carpet (both surface conveyors) lifts, service easy runs.

Pika Place is located close to the base area lodge and has a carpet conveyor for kids and beginner skiers.

Hogan's Magic Carpet, on the bunny slope, is conveniently located adjacent to the closest base area parking area. It is for beginners getting prepared to ride the nearby Molly Hogan chair lift.

Molly Hogan is a slow lift running over the bunny slope, for use by those just learning to ride a chair lift.

Black Mountain Express services greens, blues, and four blacks: The Gulch which runs parallel to Black Mountain Express; Exhibition which runs under the chair and features bumps, steep terrain, and a fair number of jumps; "Lower Standard", & "Lower International" which can be accessed from the standard race traverse.

The Pallavicini double services mostly black and double black terrain on the west side of the mountain, though it is possible to take some blues back to the base and to ski the "WestWall". The Pallavicini face itself, a group of steep runs with moguls, is rated double black diamond. It provides gated access to Steep Gullies, an even more challenging area.

The Lenawee Express takes skiers to the top of the mountain, where they can access blues, blacks, and the East and West Walls. On the West Wall there is a blue called Cornice Run where skiers can take leaps from windblown cornices. The East Wall has some of the most difficult terrain at Arapahoe Basin. The Lower East Wall is rated black diamond and can be reached without hiking. Open primarily in late winter and spring, the Upper East Wall is rated double black diamond extreme and is only accessible on foot. A hike of approximately 30 minutes will take guests to the North Pole, a very steep descent through rocky terrain over avalanche-blasted territory. Along the ridge prior to the North Pole is a group of chutes accessed through notches in the cliff band. One chute actually requires some rock downclimbing to reach skiable snow, an interesting experience in ski boots while holding a pair of skis. These chutes are often only a couple of ski widths wide and require mountaineering skiing ability. Most of the terrain is prone to avalanches and is regularly blasted by the ski patrol before they declare the wall open. The Lower and Upper East Wall is bisected by the East Wall Traverse which is quite long and accesses a lot of difficult-to-reach territory from above and below, leaving prime snow conditions available for those willing to make the trek. The entire East Wall is not groomed and should not be taken lightly since evacuation by the ski patrol in this area is a difficult undertaking.

The Zuma lift services blue, black and double black trails over the backside of Arapahoe Basin in "Montezuma Bowl". Montezuma Bowl offers everything from groomed intermediate runs to advanced cornice runs. It has mostly southern exposure.

The "Beavers Area" is 468 acres of terrain serviced by a fixed grip quad. It is a bowl to the northwest of Pallavinci, with blue and black rated runs. The full terrain includes open powder bowls, tree skiing, and rocky chutes, as well as two intermediate groomed runs.

== History ==
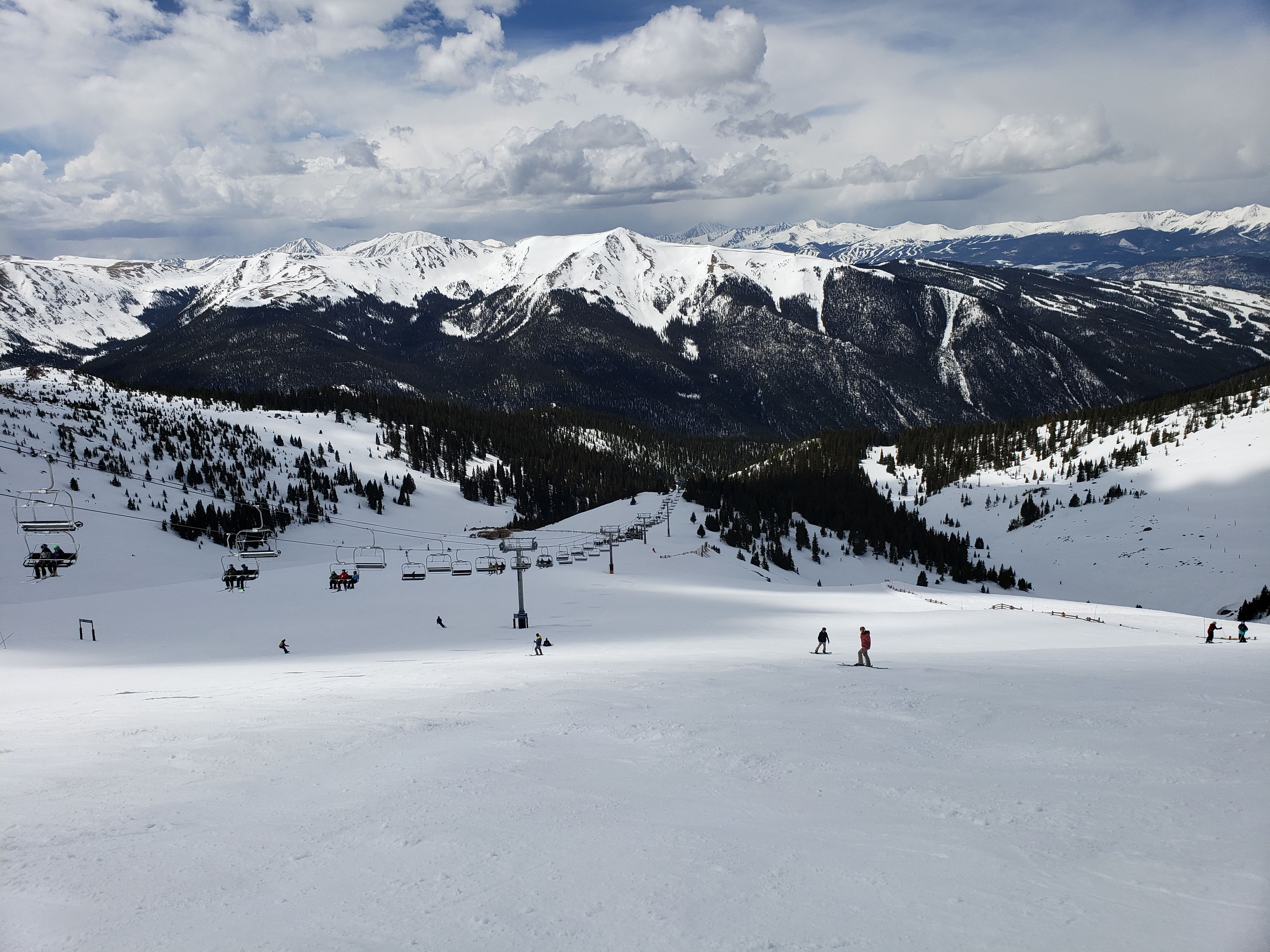
Skiers ski past the Zuma ski lift in the Montezuma Bowl area in April 2019. Keystone Resort and Breckenridge Ski Resort can be seen in the background, at the far right and top right respectively.

Larry and Marnie Jump, Max Dercum, and Sandy Shaufler started Arapahoe Basin in 1945. The first year it was open for skiing was 1946. The ski area was sold in 1972 to Joe Jankovsky. He in turn sold the area to Ralston Purina in 1978. In 1996, the ski area was purchased by Vail Resorts, however, anti-trust action by the Department of Justice forced Vail to sell in 1997 to Dundee Resort Development of Canada (now DREAM). In February 2024, Alterra entered into an agreement to purchase Arapahoe Basin, and the deal officially closed on November 19, 2024.

Arapahoe Basin became the first ski resort in the United States to open for the 2006–2007 season on October 13. It repeated for the 2007–2008 ski area by opening at 9:00 a.m. on October 10. This was the area's earliest opening in 61 years and the earliest opening in North America for the season. Arapahoe Basin opened for the 2009–2010 season on Friday, October 9, the earliest start in its history.

During the 2007–2008 season, Arapahoe Basin expanded into Montezuma Bowl, with the largest terrain expansion in the nation for that season. Facing southwest towards Keystone, it provided a back bowl. In 2010, Leitner-Poma replaced the Exhibition lift on the lower mountain with a high speed quad, the Black Mountain Express lift, Arapahoe Basin's first detachable lift. In November 2016, 468 acres were approved by the Forest Service and added to the ski area. Of those 468 acres, 329 opened for the 2017–2018 season; 232 in the Beavers section and 129 in the Steep Gullies section. Initially, the terrain was accessible by a 30-minute hike and contained expert and extreme terrain only. A fixed-grip quad chair lift was built in the summer of 2018.

In February 2019, Arapahoe Basin announced it was ending its 20+ year partnership with Vail Resorts and its Epic Pass at the end of the 2018–19 season. On August 2, 2019, Arapahoe Basin announced it would join the Ikon Pass starting with the 2019–2020 winter season.

For the 2020–2021 season, Arapahoe Basin's last two Yan double chairlifts were replaced with new lifts from Leitner-Poma. Pallavicini was replaced with a double, while Molly Hogan was replaced with a fixed grip quad. For the 2022–2023 season, the ski area received its second high speed lift with the replacement of Lenawee Mountain with a high speed six pack.

== Summer activities ==
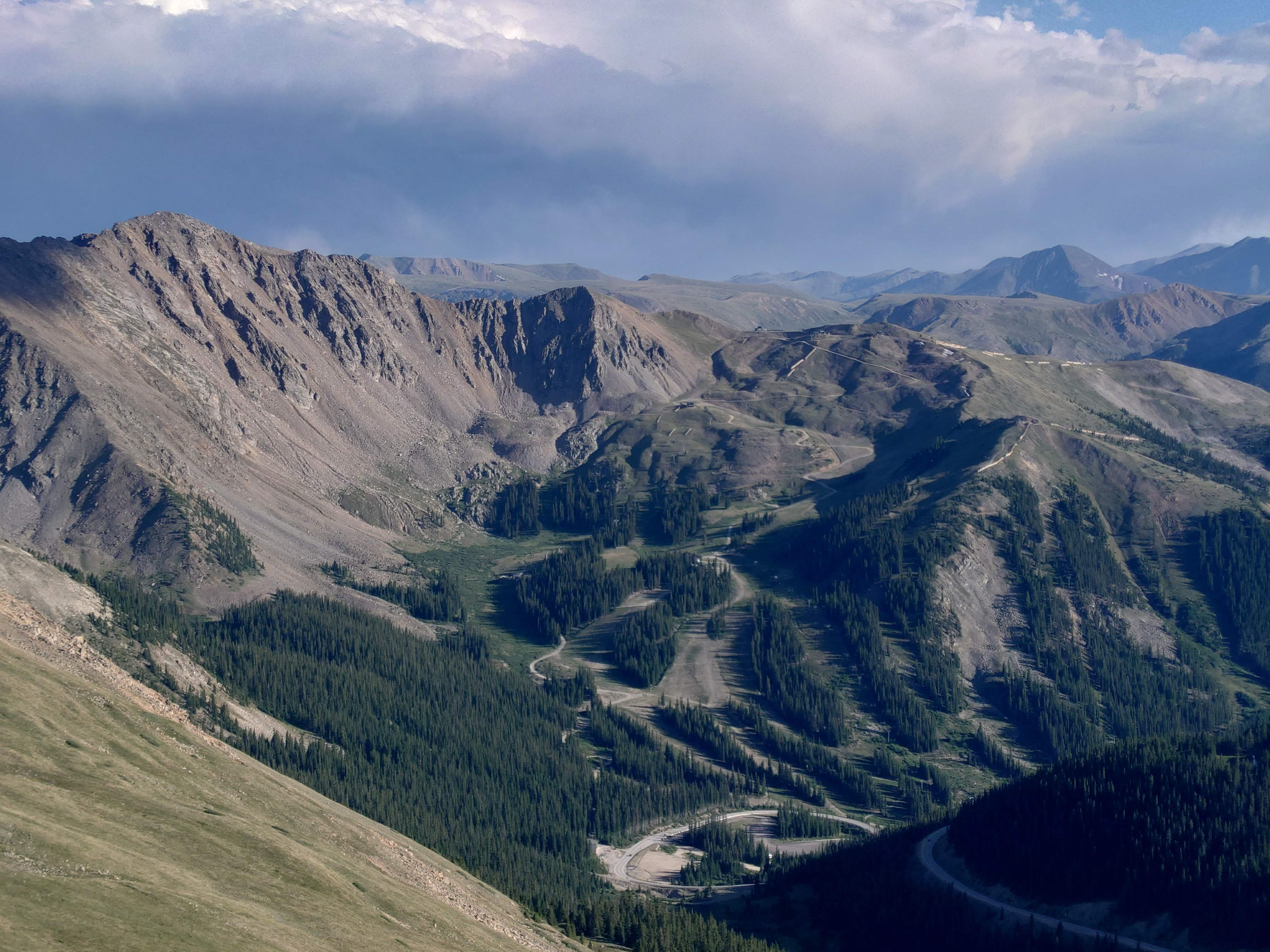
The north side of the ski area in summer 2026

- Restaurant
- Scenic lift tides
- Via ferrata
- Mountain/road biking
- Hiking
- Disc golf
- Aerial adventure Park
- Special events: Concerts, Nature Talks/Tours, Yoga Sessions, Competitions, Special Training and guidance, etc.

== Statistics ==
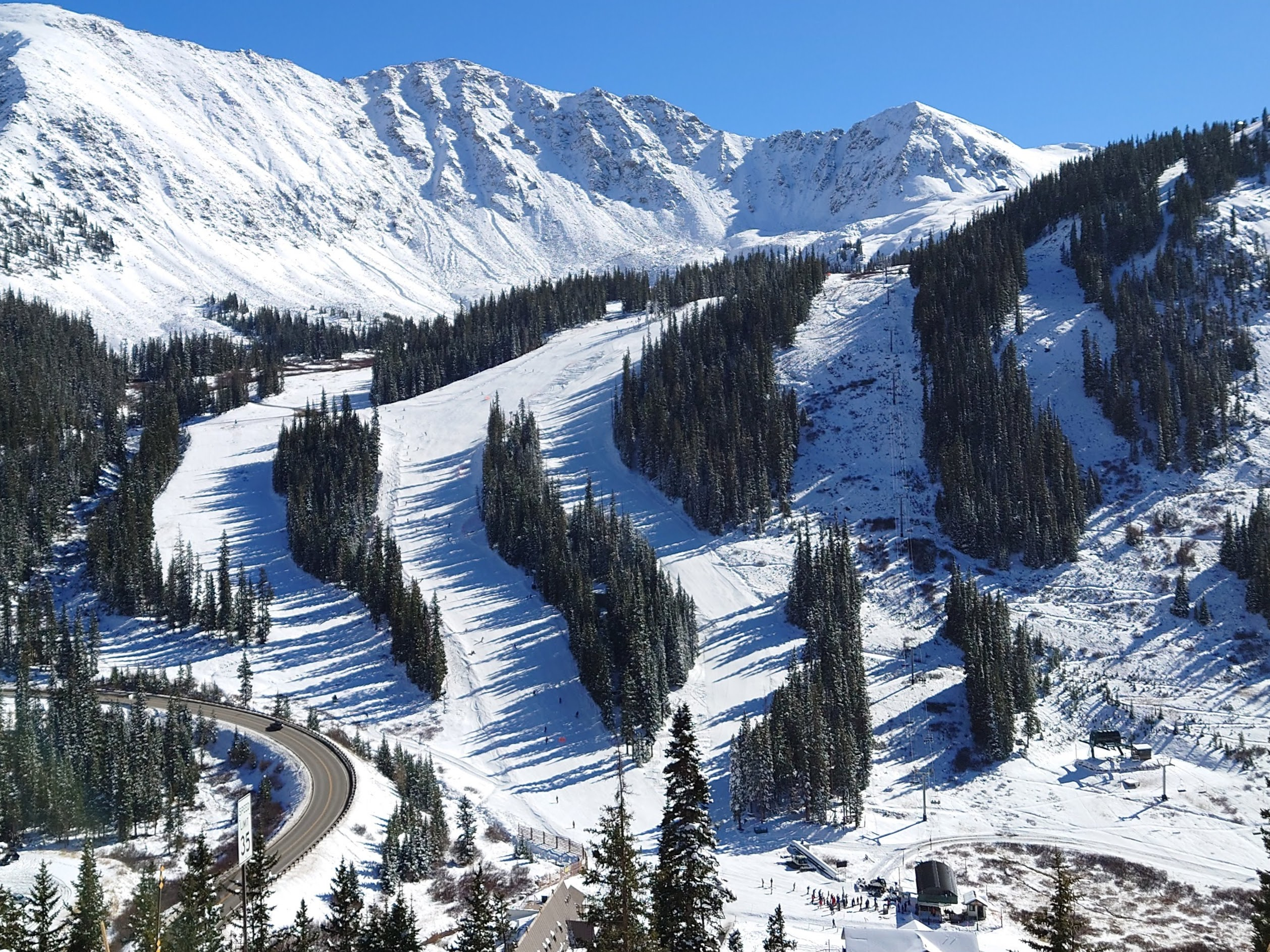
The base area and lower trails of Arapahoe Basin on October 28, 2022, 5 days after it opened for the season.

=== Elevation ===
- Lowest in-bounds point: 10,520 ft (3,207 m)
- Base: 10,780 ft (3,286 m)
- Summit: 13,050 ft (3,978 m)
- Vertical rise: 2,530 ft (771 m)

=== Trails ===
- Skiable area: 1,428 acres (5.78 km^{2})
- Trails: 145 total (7% easiest, 20% intermediate, 49% advanced, 24% expert)
- Longest run: 1.5 miles (2.4 km)
- Average annual snowfall: 350 inches (890 cm)

=== Lifts ===
Arapahoe Basin has a total of six chairlifts, and three surface lifts. All of the chairlifts at the resort are manufactured by Leitner-Poma, with most of the lift fleet being modernized throughout most of the 2010s. The oldest chairlift on the mountain is the Zuma quad, which was built in 2007.

| Name | Type | Builder | Year built | Vertical (feet) | Length (feet) | Drive | Notes |
|---|---|---|---|---|---|---|---|
| Lenawee Express | Six Pack | Leitner-Poma | 2022 | 1018 | 4002 | Bottom | Built to replace the Lenawee Triple chairlift, which was also a Leitner-Poma model. |
| Black Mountain Express | High-Speed Quad | Leitner-Poma | 2010 | 717 | 2875 | Top | Replaced a Yan triple chair called "Exhibition" in 2010. |
| Beavers | Quad | Leitner-Poma | 2018 | 1501 | 4123 | Top | Operates on the backside of the mountain, in the "Beaver Bowl". It opened hundreds of new skiable acres when built in 2018. |
| Zuma | Quad | Leitner-Poma | 2007 | 1113 | 4117 | Top | The mountains first four-person chairlift, and is the oldest lift in operation at A-Basin. |
| Molly Hogan | Quad | Leitner-Poma | 2020 | 57 | 398 | Top | One of the shortest quad chairlifts in the world, and only has two towers. |
| Pallavicini | Double | Leitner-Poma | 2020 | 1325 | 3512 | Bottom | Built to replace a historic Yan double chair of the same name in 2020. |

=== Resort Historical Opening and Closing Dates During Snowmaking Era ===
Arapahoe Basin and Loveland compete yearly for the #RaceToOpen. Ski enthusiasts from around the world watch to see who will open first. Below are the opening dates during the Snowmaking Era.

Season Open Date (Day of Week)

- 2003–2004 October 30 (Thursday)
- 2004–2005 October 22 (Friday)
- 2005–2006 October 23 (Friday)
- 2006–2007 October 13 (Friday)
- 2007–2008 October 10 (Wednesday)
- 2008–2009 October 15 (Wednesday)
- 2009–2010 October 9 (Friday) *Earliest opening
- 2010–2011 October 25 (Monday)
- 2011–2012 October 13 (Thursday)
- 2012–2013 October 17 (Wednesday)
- 2013–2014 October 13 (Sunday)
- 2014–2015 October 17 (Friday)
- 2015–2016 October 29 (Thursday)
- 2016–2017 October 21 (Friday)
- 2017–2018 October 13 (Friday)
- 2018–2019 October 19 (Friday)
- 2019–2020 October 11 (Friday)
- 2020–2021 November 9 (Monday)
- 2021–2022 October 17 (Sunday)
- 2022–2023 October 23 (Sunday)
- 2023–2024 October 29 (Sunday)
- 2024–2025 November 2 (Saturday)
- 2025-2026 October 26 (Sunday)

=== Zuma Bowl Opening and Closing Dates ===
Season Open Date Close Date Total Days Open for Zuma Bowl

- 2007-8 January 12, 2008 – May 22, 2008 – 132 Days
- 2008-9 December 30, 2008 – May 14, 2009 – 136 Days
- 2009–10 February 24, 2010 – May 16, 2010 – 82 Days
- 2010–11 December 18, 2010 – June 5, 2011 – 170 Days
- 2011–12 February 24, 2012 – March 25, 2012 – 31 Days
- 2012–13 February 13, 2013 – May 27, 2013 – 104 Days
- 2013–14 January 10, 2014 – June 1, 2014 – 143 Days
- 2014–15 December 29, 2014 – June 3, 2015 – 157 Days
- 2015–16 December 23, 2015 – June 3, 2016 – 164 Days
- 2016–17 December 23, 2016 – June 3, 2017 – 164 Days
- 2017–18 January 13, 2018 – May 16, 2018
- 2018–19 December 7, 2018 – TBD
  - 2019–20 Closed EARLY DUE TO COVID, Reopened partial mountain with reservations June 1.
- 2020–21 – TBD
- 2021–22 TBD – May 7

=== Benchmark Dates ===
- Earliest opening – October 9, 2009
- Latest Closing – August 10, 1995
- The installation of snowmaking in 2002 changed the opening from a mid-November/mid-December date to mid-October.
- Longest Season – 2018–2019. That season had 258 operating days lasting from October 19, 2018, through July 4, 2019.
- In the past 22 seasons (data from 2015)
  - East Wall opened 6 times in January
  - East Wall opened 6 times in February
  - East Wall opened 8 times in March
  - East Wall did not open during 2 dry years
  - Those years include the 2001–2002 snow year and the 2011–2012 snow year
