= Argentine Central Railway =

Narrow gauge railway in Colorado

Overview
- Headquarters: Waldorf, Colorado
- Locale: Colorado
- Dates of operation: 1906–1918

Technical
- Track gauge: 3 ft (914 mm)

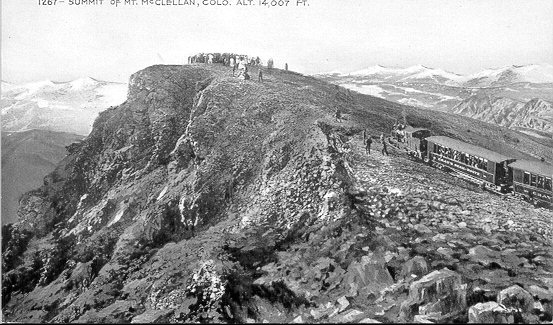
The Argentine Central Railway reached the summit of Mount McClellan

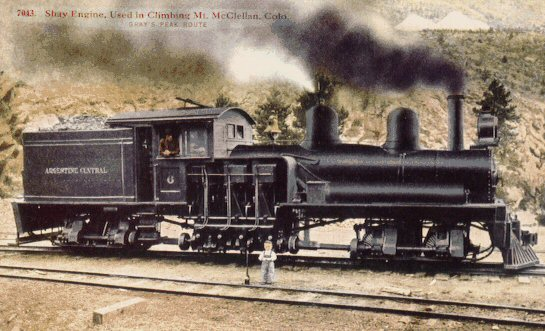
Shay locomotive of the Argentine Central

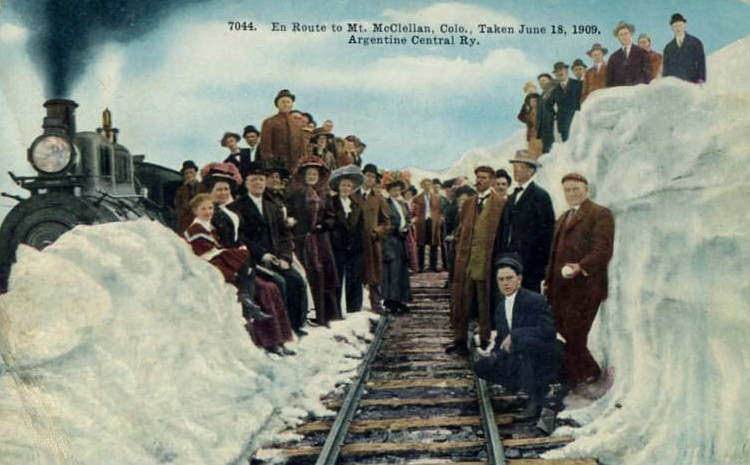
Passengers on the railway in 1909.

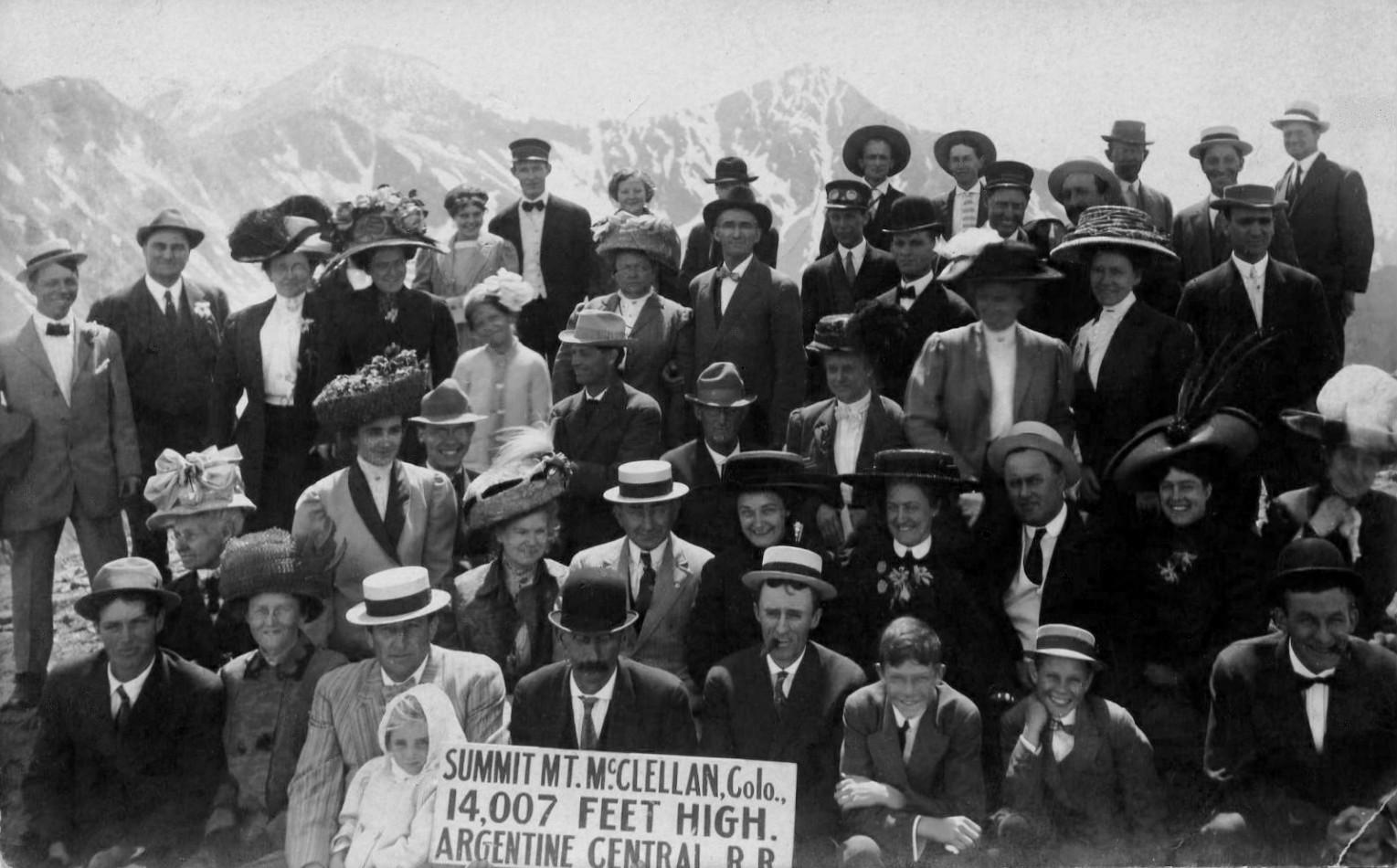
Passengers atop Mount McClellan in 1910.

The Argentine Central Railway was a 3 ft (914 mm) narrow gauge railroad in the United States built from the Colorado and Southern Railway at Silver Plume, Colorado, to Waldorf, Colorado, (now a ghost town) and onward to the summit of Mount McClellan. Construction began on August 1, 1905, and the line was opened to Waldorf a year later on August 1, 1906, a distance of about 16 miles. It was financed and organised by Edward J. Wilcox, owner of 65 mining properties in the Argentine region that were consolidated into the Waldorf Mining and Milling Company in 1902. His headquarters at Waldorf was accessible only by pack mule for much of the year.

As well as serving the silver mining operations of the region, the railroad was also intended for the tourist trade, ascending 13,587 ft (4,141 m) Mount McClellan and intending to reach the summit of 14,270 ft (4,350 m) Grays Peak nearby. It was believed at the time that Mount McClellan was 14,007 ft (4,269 m) high, but this was later disproved. It remains the highest altitude reached by a regular adhesion railway (as opposed to a rack railway) in the United States.

The line was steeply graded and sharply curved, with a standard of 6% grade maximum and 32° minimum curvature (181 feet (55 m) radius); even so, it required six switchbacks on the ascent. Due to these grades, geared steam locomotives were used exclusively, the railroad rostering a total of seven two-truck Shay locomotives.

As well as ascending to Argentine Pass and Grays Peak, Wilcox purchased the Vidler Tunnel, a project begun in 1902 to expand an existing silver mine into a railroad tunnel under the pass. The line would have extended onward to Keystone, Colorado, and a junction with the Denver, South Park and Pacific Railroad. Work on the project stopped in 1911, by which time the tunnel was three-quarters completed. The tunnel project was revived as a highway tunnel in 1952, and the 1.4 mile tunnel was completed as a water diversion tunnel in 1969.

The fall of silver prices after the Panic of 1907 ruined Wilcox, causing him to sell the railroad in 1908 for only $44,000, taking an estimated loss of $256,000 on the line. The buyer, David W. Brown of Colorado, planned an expansion in the tourist traffic and revitalised the concept of reaching Grays Peak, but the money was never there. The line went bankrupt and a receiver was appointed on August 3, 1911; it did not operate during 1911 and 1912.

The assets of the bankrupt Argentine Central were offered for auction in a Sheriff's sale on May 29, 1912. The sale netted just $5,000, a price so low that the district court ordered a resale. The second sale, on June 2, raised $20,000, but this too was set aside; the final sale, to William Rogers on Aug. 19, was for $20,002. Arguments about whether the rolling stock of the railroad was properly included in the sale led to a lawsuit that was resolved in the Colorado Supreme Court in 1915.

A consortium of local business interests led by William Rogers reorganized it as the Georgetown and Gray's Peak Railway leased to and operated by the Argentine and Gray's Peak Railway Company. At this point, the line had 3 locomotives and 16 freight cars. While the new owners were mostly interested in freight traffic, the tourist business brought in sufficient money that it was resumed for the 1913 summer season. Rogers transferred the controlling interest in the line for the next season to his associate, egg producer Fred W. Blankenbuhler.

Blankenbuhler replaced the Shay locomotives and most of the freight cars with 40-passenger gasoline-powered railcars for the 1916 season. Some of the last freight hauled over the 9-miles from Silver Plume to Waldorf was 100,000 pounds (50 tons) of telephone poles, wire, insulators and supplies for Mountain States Telephone & Telegraph in the summer of 1917. This was for the Argentine Pass segment of a long-distance telephone line from Denver to Leadville. Because the railroad was exclusively a tourist line at this time, all freight had to be hauled at night or early in the morning. The freight charge for this load of telephone supplies was $500, or $1.11 per ton-mile. In contrast, the average freight rate in the United States in 1915 was under $0.008 per ton-mile.

Despite the costs saved by the switch to self-propelled railcars, the railroad was not profitable without the regular freight traffic it had previously carried. Notice to abandon was posted on October 24, 1918, and approved on November 9; the tracks were removed in the summer of 1919.
