= Argentine Peak =

Mountain in the state of Colorado

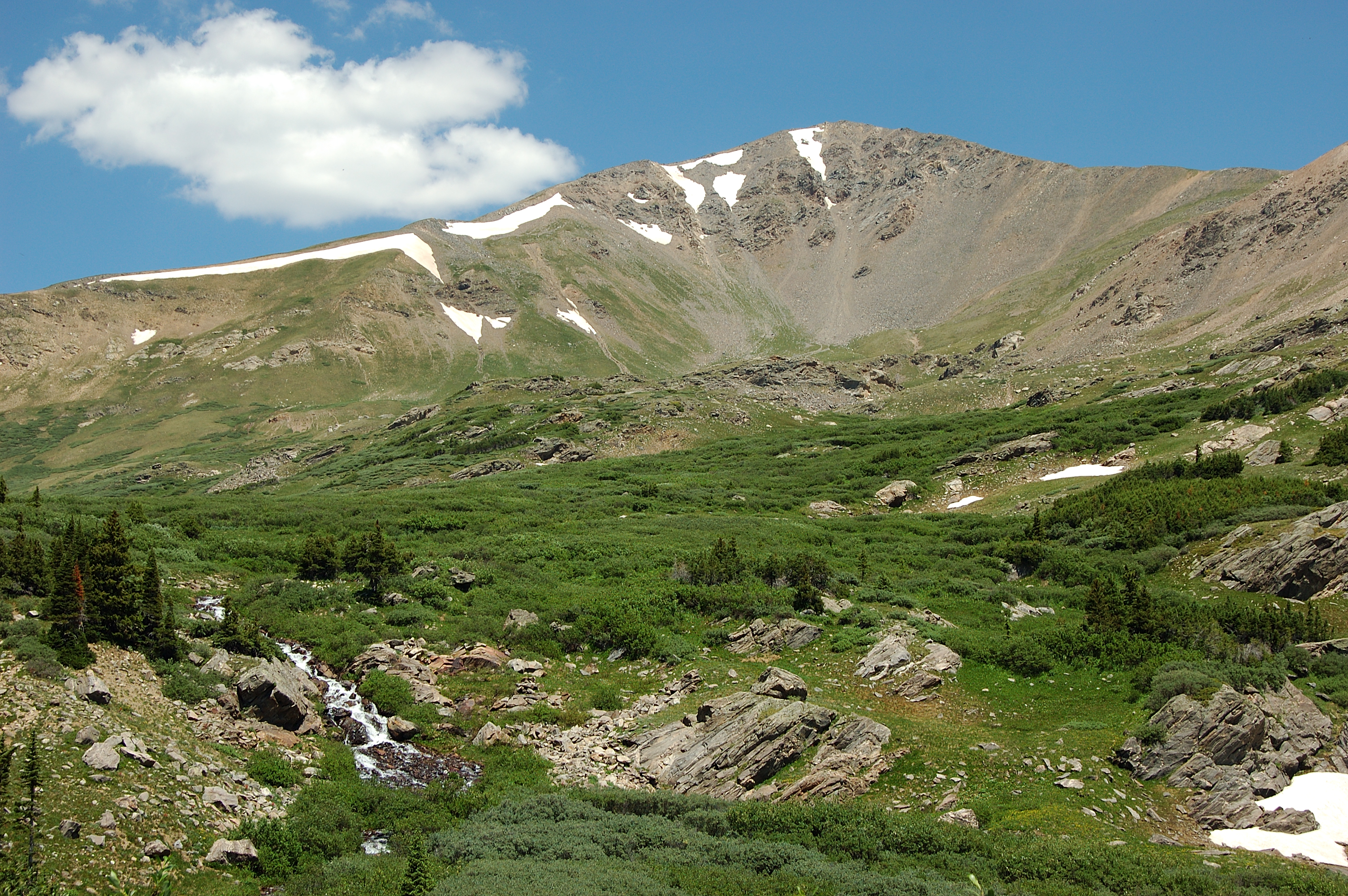
- Argentine Peak, July 2006

Highest point
- Elevation: 13,743 ft (4,189 m)
- Prominence: 638 ft (194 m)
- Isolation: 1.49 mi (2.40 km)
- Coordinates: 39°36′44″N 105°46′38″W

Geography
- Location within Colorado
- Location: Continental Divide between Clear Creek and Summit counties, Colorado, United States
- Parent range: Front Range
- Topo map(s): USGS 7.5' topographic map Montezuma, Colorado

Climbing
- Easiest route: Hike

Argentine Peak is a high mountain summit in the Front Range of the Rocky Mountains of North America. The 13,743-foot (4,189 m) thirteener is located in Arapaho National Forest, 8.5 miles (13.6 km) southwest by south (bearing 211°) of Georgetown, Colorado, United States. The summit lies on the Continental Divide between Clear Creek and Summit counties.

The peak is approximately 1 mile south of Argentine Pass. The peak and the pass take their names from the Argentine District, Colorado's first major silver mining district. Argentum is the Latin word for silver, for the silver ore found in the area.

== Climate ==
Climate data for Argentine Peak 39.6103 N, 105.7774 W, Elevation: 13,327 ft (4,062 m) (1991–2020 normals)
Month	Jan	Feb	Mar	Apr	May	Jun	Jul	Aug	Sep	Oct	Nov	Dec	Year
Mean daily maximum °F (°C)	19.5 (−6.9)	18.4 (−7.6)	25.3 (−3.7)	32.8 (0.4)	41.1 (5.1)	51.8 (11.0)	57.9 (14.4)	55.3 (12.9)	49.0 (9.4)	38.0 (3.3)	26.5 (−3.1)	19.8 (−6.8)	36.3 (2.4)
Daily mean °F (°C)	9.5 (−12.5)	8.6 (−13.0)	14.5 (−9.7)	20.6 (−6.3)	29.4 (−1.4)	39.6 (4.2)	45.9 (7.7)	43.9 (6.6)	37.6 (3.1)	27.1 (−2.7)	16.8 (−8.4)	10.0 (−12.2)	25.3 (−3.7)
Mean daily minimum °F (°C)	−0.4 (−18.0)	−1.2 (−18.4)	3.7 (−15.7)	8.5 (−13.1)	17.6 (−8.0)	27.4 (−2.6)	33.9 (1.1)	32.5 (0.3)	26.1 (−3.3)	16.2 (−8.8)	7.1 (−13.8)	0.2 (−17.7)	14.3 (−9.8)
Average precipitation inches (mm)	3.24 (82)	3.23 (82)	3.15 (80)	3.76 (96)	2.84 (72)	1.89 (48)	3.19 (81)	3.05 (77)	2.18 (55)	2.07 (53)	2.71 (69)	2.98 (76)	34.29 (871)
Source: PRISM Climate Group

== See also ==
- List of Colorado mountain ranges
- List of Colorado mountain summits
  - List of Colorado fourteeners
  - List of Colorado 4000 meter prominent summits
  - List of the most prominent summits of Colorado
- List of Colorado county high points
