= Pass Lake =

Lake in Summit County, Colorado, United States

- Location of Pass Lake within Colorado
- Location: Summit County, Colorado
- Coordinates: 39°39′17″N 105°52′44″W
- Surface elevation: 11,834 feet (3,607 m)

Pass Lake is a small lake located south of Loveland Pass in Summit County, Colorado. Pass Lake drains east via an unnamed stream which flows into North Fork Snake River. The Pass Lake Picnic Area is located by the lake.
