= Dillon Reservoir =

Fresh water reservoir in Summit County, Col., US

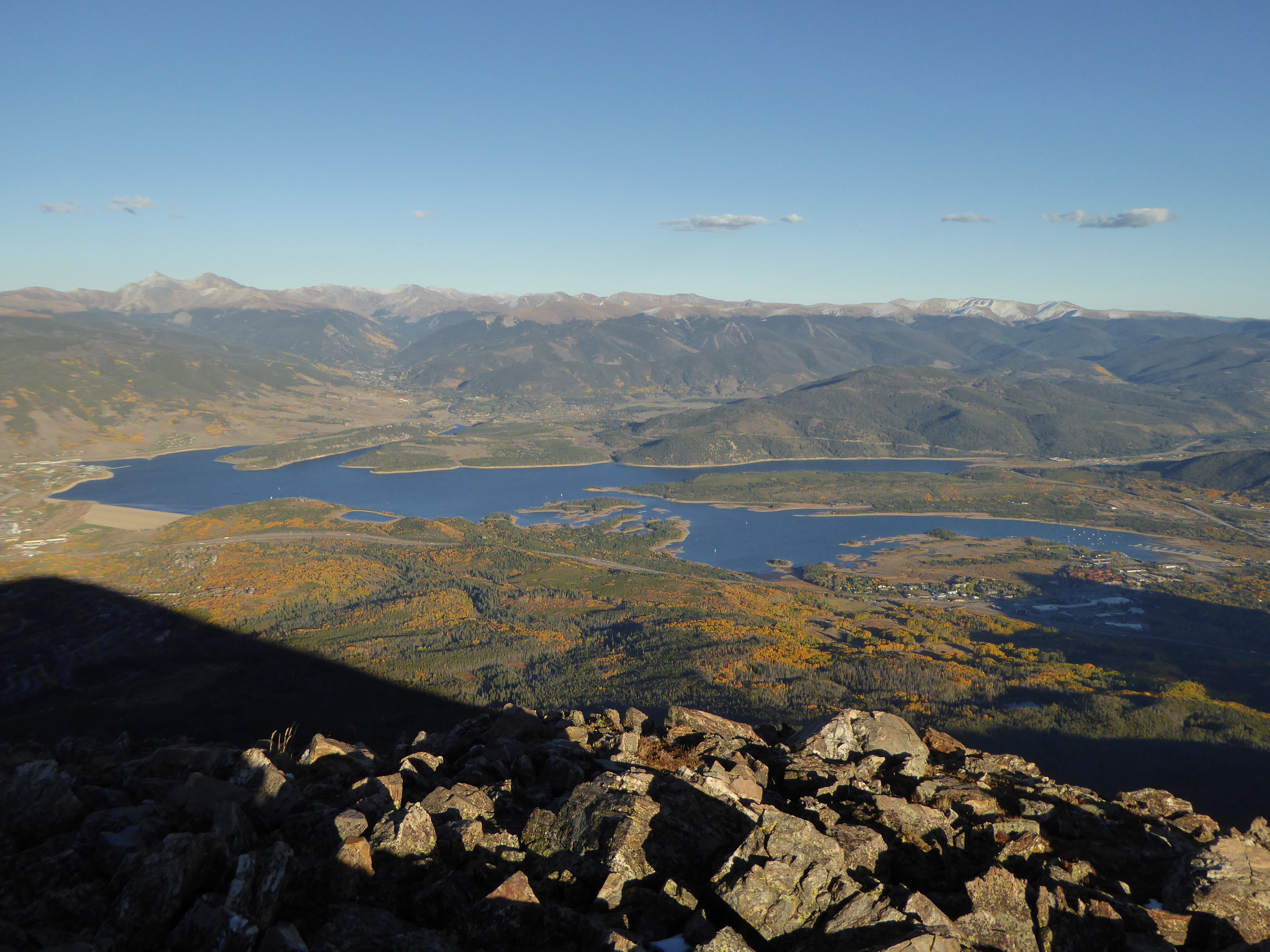
- Dillon Reservoir as seen from Buffalo Mountain, with Dillon Dam seen at left

- Location within Colorado Location within the United States
- Location: Summit County, Colorado, United States
- Coordinates: 39°36′27″N 106°03′18″W
- Type: Reservoir
- Primary inflows: Blue River, Snake River
- Primary outflows: Blue River
- Basin countries: United States
- Surface area: 3,233 acres (1,308 ha)
- Water volume: 250,000 acre⋅ft (310,000,000 m^{3})
- Shore length^{1}: 26.8 mi (43.1 km)
- Surface elevation: 9,017 ft (2,748 m)
- ^{1} Shore length is not a well-defined measure.

Dillon Reservoir, sometimes referred to as Lake Dillon, is a large fresh water reservoir located in Summit County, Colorado, United States, south of I-70 and bordered by the towns of Frisco, Silverthorne, and Dillon. It is a reservoir for the city of Denver, and its waters are under the control of Denver Water. Popular ski areas are close to the reservoir, including Copper Mountain, Keystone, Arapahoe Basin, and Breckenridge.

== History ==
In 1859, a large party of gold-seekers led by Ruben Spalding discovered gold near the headwaters of the Blue River, which prompted a population surge in Summit County, Colorado. By October 1859, nearly 100 miners had camped along the river. By 1880, the human population of Summit county had swelled to 5,459. In 1881, Dillon Mining Company patented a 320-acre (130 ha) parcel and divided it into lots to establish the trade-post town of Dillon along the northeast bank of the Snake River, which is part of what was then called Blue River Valley. The town of Dillon was incorporated in 1883, but soon relocated to the west bank of the Blue River when the Denver and Rio Grande Railroad came to Blue River Valley but had bypassed Dillon. Dillon was moved a second time in 1892 when the Denver, South Park and Pacific Railroad arrived from the northeast. The town was located at the confluence of three rivers: the Blue, Snake, and Tenmile Creek to provide one station for the two railroad lines. In 1890, Dillon's population was 133, less than 20% as large as Breckenridge at the time. Prior to its third move to the present location in 1961, the town had grown to 814 residents, the largest town in Summit County, however, most of this population consisted of construction workers for the dam.

The idea to dam the Blue River and divert the water to Denver originated in the early 1900s. The Denver Water Board acquired most of the land needed for the reservoir for the price of back taxes during the Great Depression when many Dillon residents were unable to pay property taxes. By then, the board had already acquired most of the water rights in the valley; in 1956, it notified the remaining residents and business owners they must sell and leave by September 15, 1961. Dam construction began in 1961 and was completed in 1963. The dam is earth-filled, 5,888 feet (1.12 mi; 1.79 km) in length, and rises 231 feet (70 m) above the Blue River stream bed.

The dam diverts water from the Blue River Basin through the 23.3-mile (37.5 km) Harold D. Roberts Tunnel under the continental divide into the South Platte River Basin. Tunneling began in 1942 and the tunnel was holed-through in early 1960, with construction completed 1962. Curiously, alternative routes were still under consideration as late as the mid-1950s. Tunneling began from the east portal, just west of Grant on the North Fork of the South Platte River, but was eventually done from both ends as well as from a 916-foot (279 m) deep access shaft 1.7 miles (2.7 km) northwest of Montezuma. At its deepest, the tunnel passes 4,465 feet (1,361 m) below the surface near Santa Fe Peak on the continental divide. The tunnel is fully lined, with an inside diameter of 10.25 feet (3.12 m), and it permits a flow of 1,020 cubic feet per second (29 m^{3}/s). In a typical year, about 60,000 acre⋅ft (74 million m^{3}) of water pass through the tunnel.

The Denver Water Board set aside a 172 acres (70 ha) site for a new Town of Dillon; it had acquired a portion of the Fred Phillips Ranch at the northeast edge of what was to be Dillon Reservoir. Residents and businesses were responsible for the expense of moving their structures. Many chose not to, but the Dillon Community Church, Town Hall, and Arapaho Café and Motel were moved to the new town, and still exist today. The original church building is now a museum operated by the local Historical Society with many Dillon artifacts of the late 1800s and early 1900s. Also, 327 graves were moved to a new 39-acre (16 ha) cemetery northeast of the new town site.

Several buildings ended up in neighboring towns. Antler's Café and Bar and the Kremmling Store were moved to Frisco. The Hamilton–Dillon Hotel was moved to Breckenridge. The Mint Bar, Old Dillon Inn, Wildwood Bar, the post office and a general store were moved to what later became Silverthorne. Most of the rest of Old Dillon's homes and buildings were demolished. Once cleared, the valley was ready for the reservoir, which was completed in 1963. After its third move, Dillon's population shrank to 57 people, smaller than Breckenridge, Silverthorne, or Frisco.

== Tourism ==
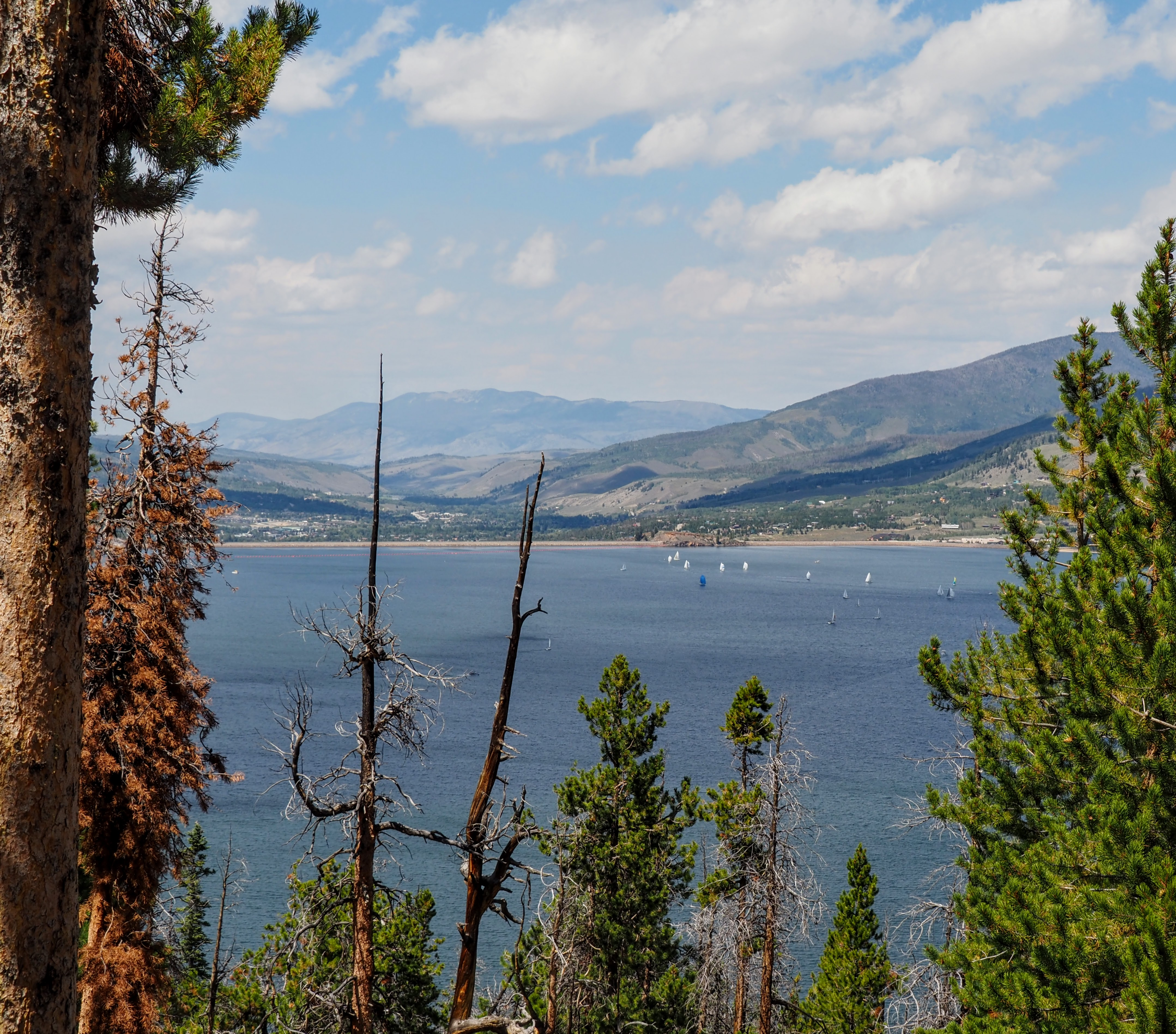
Dillon Reservoir and Dillon Dam, with boaters in the summer, as seen from Sapphire Point

During ski season, thousands of people flock to the Dillon Reservoir area, since it is close to four ski resorts. Keystone Ski Resort is a large tourist destination that is located approximately 5 miles (8.0 km) away. Breckenridge, one of the largest ski resorts in Colorado, is located approximately 7 miles (11 km) from Dillon Reservoir. Copper Mountain is located approximately 8 miles (13 km) from Dillon Reservoir. Arapahoe Basin is a medium-sized resort that is approximately 10 miles (16 km) from the lake.

The reservoir itself is a center of attraction for the area. During the winter months, ice fishing and snowmobiling are common activities. In warmer months, the towns of Dillon and Frisco each have marinas on the reservoir. Dillon Marina hosts many weekend racing regattas and also provides sailboats for rent. The Dillon Yacht Club is based out of the Dillon Marina and also hosts many sailing events. Dillon Reservoir is stocked every year with 50,000 rainbow trout by Colorado Parks and Wildlife.

Adjacent to the marina is the Dillon Amphitheater, an open-air amphitheater which hosts free and paid concerts and community events throughout the summer.

Due to Dillon Reservoir's proximity to the towns of Dillon, Silverthorne, and Frisco, the lake has many lodging, camping, and RV facilities.

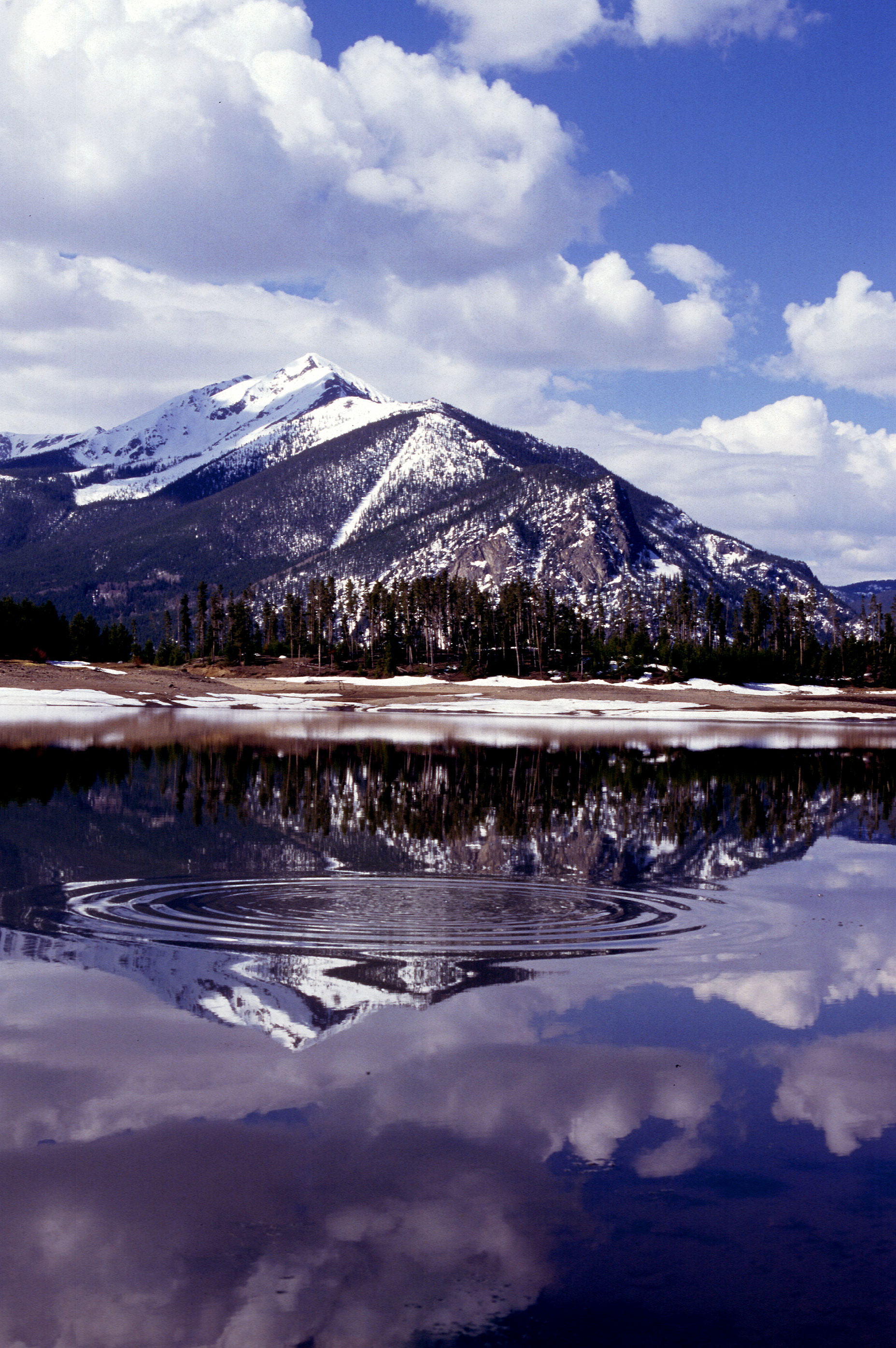
Spring snowmelt fills Dillon Reservoir

Dillon Reservoir has a popular 18 miles (29 km) paved bike path that winds around the entire reservoir. The path can be accessed at any point around the reservoir. Starting in Frisco and going clockwise, it goes behind the Summit Middle School, marshlands, and continues across the Dam road. It passes the towns of Silverthorne and Dillon. Once into Summit Cove subdivision, the path climbs over Swan Mountain and reaches its highest elevation of 9,500 feet (2,900 m) above sea level at the top at Sapphire Point, which is 1,100 feet (340 m) above the lowest point of the bike path. This is a popular lookout over Dillon Reservoir and much of Summit County. The path dissolves into the road on the other side. Bikers and cars must share the road. At the bottom, the path resumes near Summit High School. The path goes behind the hospital and back into Frisco.

== Weather ==
Dillon averages 127 inches (10.6 ft; 3.2 m) of annual snowfall. It generally snows from late September to mid-May. There are nearly 300 days of sun during the year, and this keeps the area snow totals lower than the average amount of precipitation the area receives. Almost every day of the year, some sort of precipitation will fall from the sky, with July generally being the wettest month of the year. July is usually the warmest month of the year also with the average high around 73 °F (23 °C). January is the coldest month of the year with the average high being around 31 °F (−1 °C). The average low in July is 40 °F (4 °C), and the average low in January is 2 °F (−17 °C).

== Geography ==
Dillon Reservoir has a maximum elevation of 9,017 feet (2,748 m) above sea level and a capacity of 257,304 acre-feet (320 million cubic meters). Its shore length is approximately 26.8 miles (43.1 km). Dillon Dam is 5,888 feet (1,795 m) long and 231 feet (70 m) wide. The average depth of the reservoir is 79 feet (24 m). The deepest depth of the Reservoir is 220 feet (67 m). It has a regulated water level and it has a catchment area of 330 square miles (850 km^{2}). It contains Silver Dollar Island.

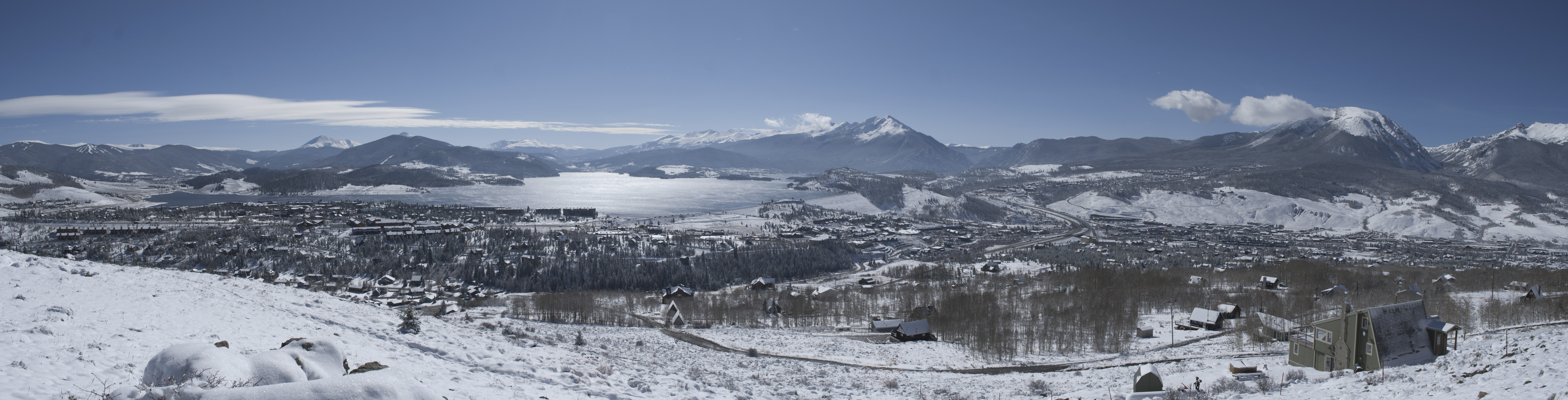
Panoramic view of the Dillon Reservoir and surrounding towns.

== Security issues ==
In 2008, residents of surrounding areas found Dillon Dam Road closed on numerous occasions for security reasons.

In January 2008, the Summit County Sheriff Dept. found two men videotaping a music video on the dam road, already closed at the time for weather purposes. As is protocol for possible threats involving dams, the FBI were asked to investigate the situation as well. The men were cleared of any suspicious activity though the dam remained closed for a short time afterward.

On July 8, Denver Water closed the dam road to all traffic apart from emergency vehicles, pedestrians and bicyclists, leading to a lawsuit against the utility company by Summit County representatives. Despite having spent $10 million on increasing security measures for the dam since September 11, the utility felt the dam was still at risk of possible threats, especially to the town of Silverthorne, which lies north of, and directly beneath the dam.

The dam road was re-opened on July 25, but with strict stipulations imposed by Denver Water, including weight restrictions on vehicles, officers in security vehicles being placed on either end of the dam at any time during the day, and closing the road from 10 p.m. to 6 a.m. Emergency vehicles requiring the use of the road during the closed hours must lower the steel barricades on both ends to get through.

In 2011, the Dillon Dam Road was closed completely for several weeks while security was revamped with new guard shacks on either end of the structure, improved lighting and roundabouts. With the completion of the project in October, the road was reopened 24 hours a day with guards stationed on either end around the clock.

== Water use ==
Dillon Reservoir is the largest water storage facility owned and operated by Denver Water. The reservoir has a capacity of 257,304 acre-feet (320 million cubic meters) of water. Of that, 249,000 acre-feet (307,000,000 m^{3}) is "usable" water. "Usable" is defined as being free to use due to legal, operational, or physical constraints. Customers of Denver Water number upwards of 1.3 million people who annually consume 265,000 acre-feet (327,000,000 m^{3}) of water.

To reach that level, Denver Water uses several sources of which Dillon Reservoir provides forty percent of the total amount, or 106,000 acre-feet (131,000,000 m^{3}). The reservoir has an annual median usable water level of ninety-two percent.

One acre-foot (1,230 m^{3}; 326,000 US gal) of water will, on average, service 2.5 single-family households per year.

As Dillon reservoir is on the west side of the continental divide, in 1962 the Harold D. Roberts Tunnel was completed to bring water to Denver across the Divide. Because of the large concentration of population of the eastern side of the state, and the concentration of water sources on the western slope, the State of Colorado, and Denver Water have determined it necessary to transfer water from west to east in order to support the population.

== Service area ==
The Denver Water service area extends from the borders of Highlands Ranch north to about 56th Avenue, with further coverage to Denver International Airport and Interstate 25 at 88th Avenue. The service area also extends from the west edge of Aurora to the east edge of Morrison. The exception in this region is that Denver Water does not cover the City of Englewood. Legally, Denver Water is not obligated to, nor does it provide customers the information of which watershed their tap water originated.

== See also ==
- Dillon, CO
- Dillon Amphitheater
- Frisco, CO
- List of largest reservoirs of Colorado
