= Buck Moyer =

American Lutheran bishop (1920–2015)

The Reverend Dr Virgil A. Moyer, Jr.
- Bishop (President)
- Church: Evangelical Lutheran Church in America
- Diocese: Virginia Synod
- Elected: 1976
- In office: 1976–1987
- Predecessor: J. Luther Mauney
- Successor: Richard F. Bansemer

Orders
- Ordination: 1945 by Virginia Synod, Lutheran Church in America

Personal details
- Born: October 28, 1920
- Died: June 1, 2015 (aged 94) Waynesboro, Virginia

The Reverend Doctor Virgil A. (Buck) Moyer, Jr. (October 28, 1920 – June 1, 2015) was a Lutheran pastor who served as president and Bishop of the Virginia Synod from 1976 to 1987.

Virgil A. Moyer, Jr. was born on October 28, 1920, to Virgil Albert Sr. and Ruth McCune Moyer. Moyer was ordained in 1945, with a Bachelor of Divinity from Southern Seminary, and earned a Doctor of Divinity from Roanoke College in 1977. He married Jaqueline Mildred Jones in 1945, and served a variety of congregations in Virginia. Moyer was instrumental in planning for the synod's merger into the Evangelical Lutheran Church in America on January 1, 1988. He supported creation of the Metropolitan Washington Synod and the alignment of the synod into Region 9 of the ELCA. In 1971 he led the development of Caroline Furnace Camp while serving as Assistant to the President of the Synod (1959-1968). He also served as regional mission consultant for the Lutheran Church in America's Division for Mission in North America (1973-1976). He was named President Emeritus of the Virginia Synod upon his retirement in 1987.
