= James F. Mauney =

American Lutheran bishop

The Reverend James F. Mauney
- Bishop Emeritus
- Church: Evangelical Lutheran Church in America
- Diocese: Virginia Synod
- Elected: 1999
- In office: 1999–2017
- Predecessor: The Reverend Richard F. Bansemer
- Successor: The Reverend Robert F. Humphrey

Orders
- Ordination: 1978 by Lutheran Theological Southern Seminary, Lutheran Church in America

The Reverend James F. Mauney is a Lutheran pastor who served as Bishop of the Virginia Synod from 1999-2017. James Foltz Mauney was born to The Rev. Marshall F. Mauney and Laura Virginia Foltz Mauney of Norfolk, VA. His father served as pastor at First Lutheran, Norfolk, for 20 years.

Rev. James F. Mauney was first elected bishop in 1999, succeeding the Rev. Richard F. Bansemer. Mauney had served since 1988 as an assistant to Bansemer. Born in Lynchburg, Va., and raised in Norfolk, Va., Jim Mauney graduated from Lenoir-Rhyne College, Hickory, N.C., and Lutheran Theological Southern Seminary (LTSS), Columbia, S.C. Lenoir-Rhyne is one of 28 Evangelical Lutheran Church in America colleges and universities; LTSS is one of eight ELCA seminaries. He was ordained in 1978 and served as pastor of Christ Lutheran Church, San Diego CA, and Christ Lutheran Church, Richmond VA. Bishop Mauney and his wife Lynda are the parents of an adult daughter. They are members of College Evangelical Lutheran Church, Salem. In 2017, Bishop Mauney retired and was designated Bishop Emeritus of the Virginia Synod ELCA.
