= North Fork Snake River =

Physical characteristics
- Source
  - location: Summit County, Colorado
  - coordinates: 39°39′45″N 105°52′17″W
- Mouth
  - location: Confluence with Snake
  - coordinates: 39°36′18″N 105°56′31″W
  - elevation: 9,350 ft (2,850 m)

Basin features
- Progression: Snake—Blue—Colorado
- Waterfalls: Snake River Falls

The North Fork Snake River is a tributary of the Snake River in central Colorado in the United States. It flows from a source near Loveland Pass to a confluence with the Snake River in Keystone. Pass Lake is a secondary source of the river.

== See also ==
- List of rivers of Colorado
- List of tributaries of the Colorado River
