= Dillon Amphitheater =

Amphitheater in Dillon, Colorado, U.S.

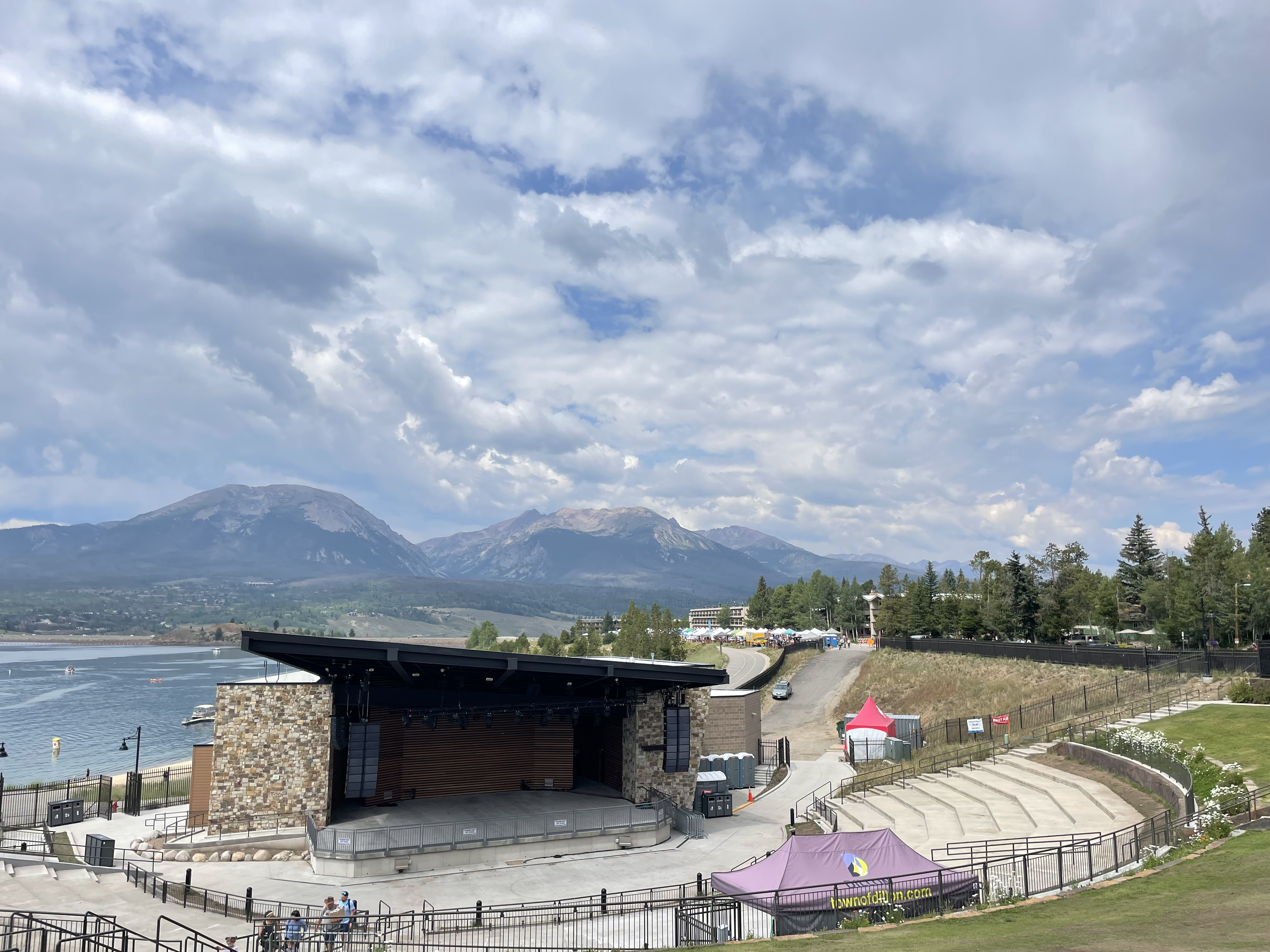
- Interactive map of Dillon Amphitheater
- Location: 135 W Lodgepole; Dillon, Colorado, US
- Coordinates: 39°37′33″N 106°2′49″W
- Elevation: 9,050 feet (2,760 m)
- Operator: Dillon, Colorado
- Capacity: 3,656

Construction
- Opened: 1993; 33 years ago
- Renovated: 2017-2018

Website
- dillonamp.com

The Dillon Amphitheater is an open-air amphitheater built on the north shore of the Dillon Reservoir in Dillon, Colorado, about 65 miles (105 km) west of Denver, Colorado.

== History ==
In the first 25 years following its construction in 1993, it was used mainly as a community bandshell with free shows held on weekends throughout the summer, hosting local artists and acts ranging from country to jazz.

In 2017, in effort by the town to revitalize the community and attract larger acts and audiences, significant renovation efforts to the facility began. While initial concept plans of the new facility drew criticism from the community over its design and potential impacts to views of the surrounding nature, revisions were made to the design to better align the facility with the rest of the "town's character". At a final cost of $9.7 million, the renovation included a complete rebuild of the bandshell and stage, new green rooms and storage areas, a concession space, as well as additional restrooms and a walking plaza. The seating bowl is the only structure remaining from the original facility.

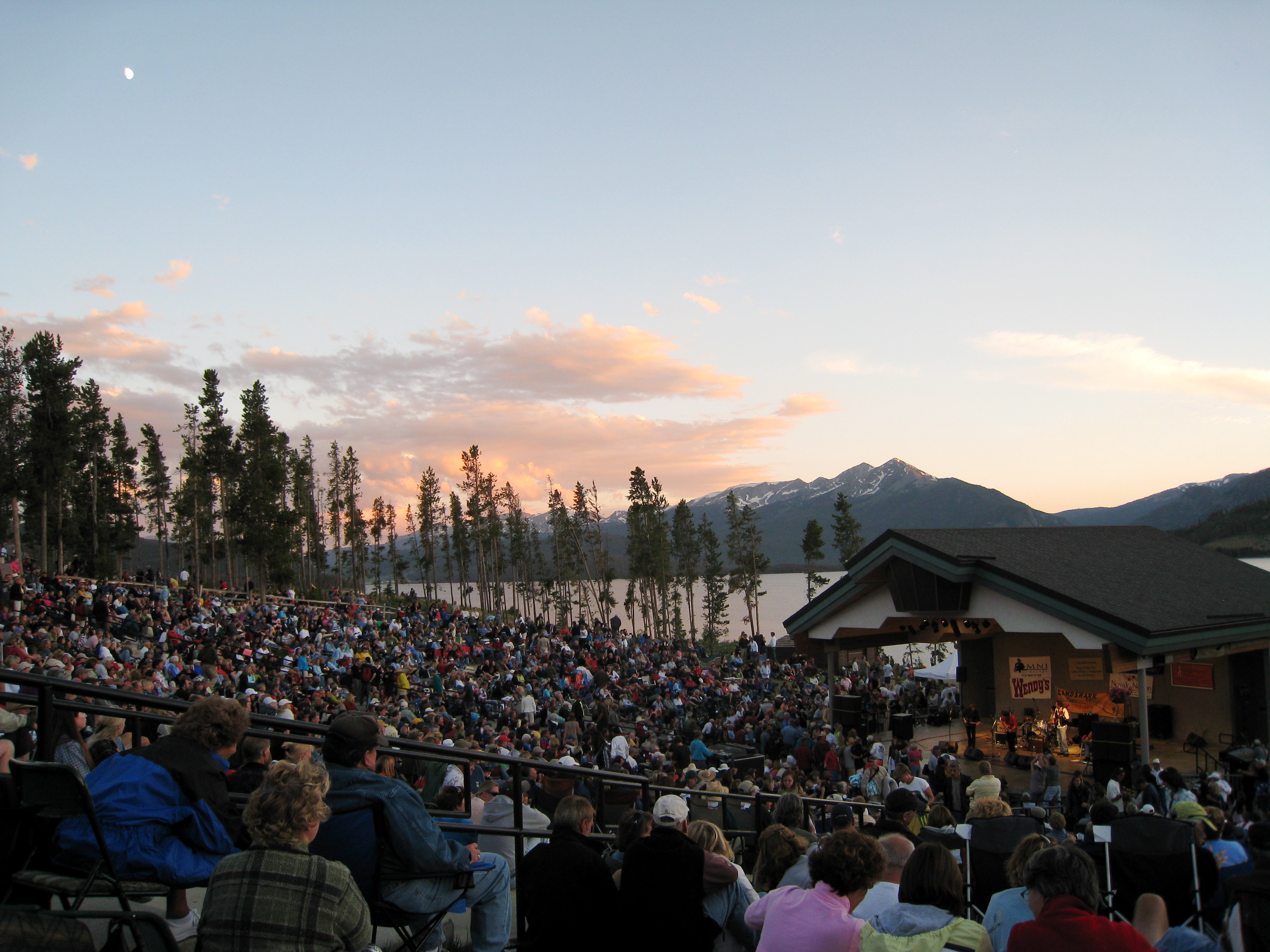
Photo from Dillon's free summer concert series, showing the original bandshell

The revamped facility opened in 2018 with a performance by The String Cheese Incident. Other notable acts that have since played the venue include Bob Dylan, Caamp, The B-52s, Brothers Osborne, Shakey Graves, Pretty Lights, among many others. Free concerts are still held, along with other events, including "Movies on the Water", "Yoga at the Amphitheater", and country-western dancing.

== See also ==
- List of contemporary amphitheatres
