= Snake River (Colorado) =

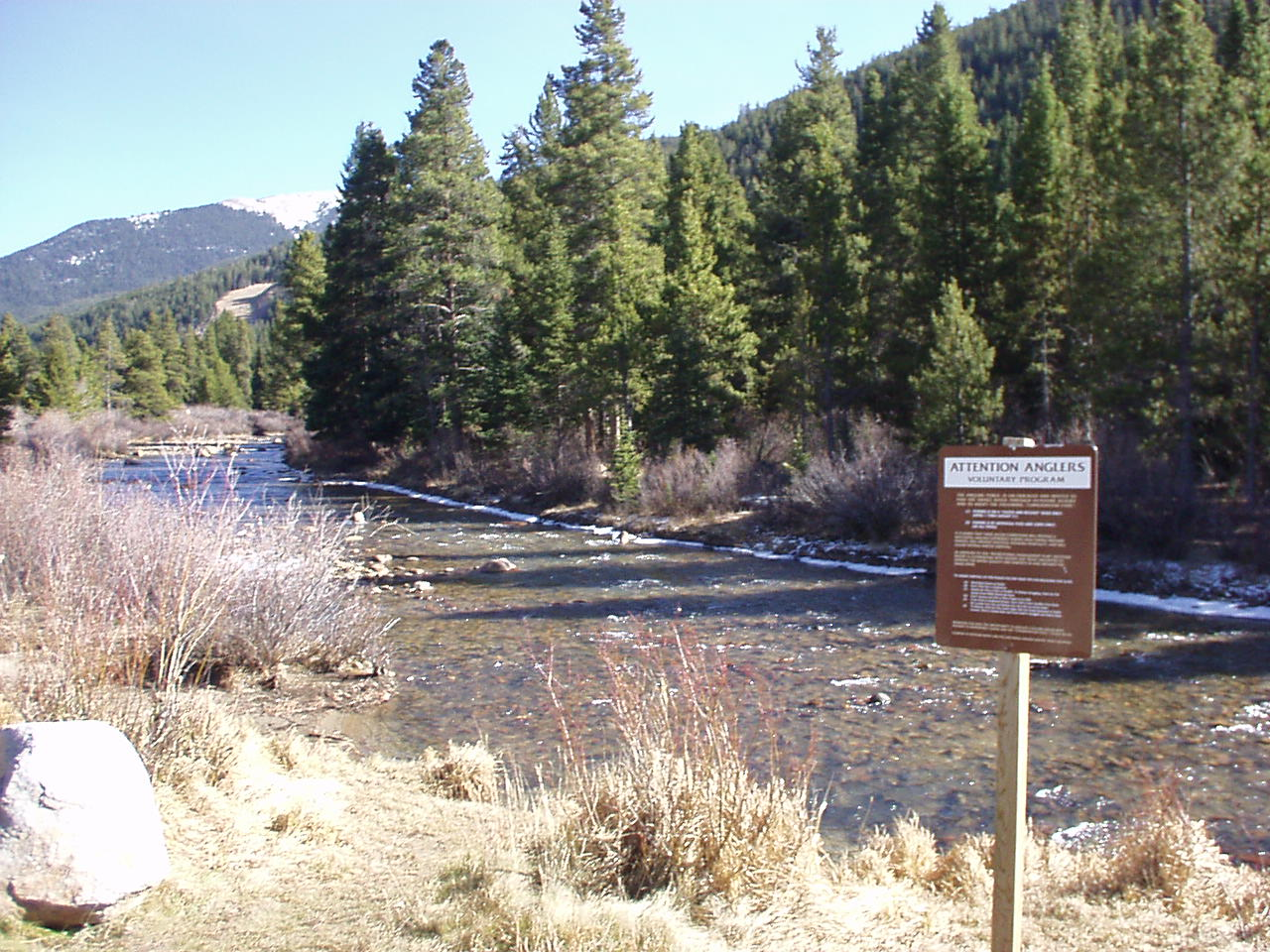
- Snake River near Keystone

Physical characteristics
- Source
  - location: Summit County, Colorado
  - coordinates: 39°32′01″N 105°51′16″W
- Mouth: Dillon Reservoir
  - location: Confluence with Blue at Dillon Reservoir
  - coordinates: 39°36′55″N 106°03′15″W
  - elevation: 9,022 ft (2,750 m)
- Length: 15 mi (24 km)

Basin features
- Tributaries
  - left: Deer Creek, Soda Creek
  - right: North Fork Snake River

The Snake River is a short tributary of the Blue River, approximately 15 miles (24 km) long, in central Colorado in the United States. It drains a mountainous area on the west side of the Front Range in southeastern Summit County east of Keystone.

It rises near the continental divide near Webster Pass along the Summit-Park county line and descends through a steep canyon to the north past the former mining camp of Montezuma, then turns west to flow past Keystone, where it joins the Blue from the east as an arm of Dillon Reservoir.

== See also ==
- List of rivers of Colorado
- List of tributaries of the Colorado River
