= Montezuma, Colorado =

Town in Colorado, United States

Town of Montezuma, Colorado
- Statutory Town
- Location of Montezuma in Summit County, Colorado.
- Coordinates: 39°34′53″N 105°52′04″W
- Country: United States
- State: Colorado
- County: Summit County
- Founded: 1865
- Incorporated: September 1881

Government
  - Type: Statutory Town

Area
  - Total: 0.081 sq mi (0.21 km^{2})
  - Land: 0.081 sq mi (0.21 km^{2})
  - Water: 0 sq mi (0.00 km^{2})
- Elevation: 10,302 ft (3,140 m)

Population (2020)
  - Total: 74
  - Density: 910/sq mi (350/km^{2})
- Time zone: UTC-7 (MST)
  - Summer (DST): UTC-6 (MDT)
- ZIP code: 80435
- Area code: 970
- FIPS code: 08-51690
- GNIS feature ID: 2413008
- Highways: none (connected to US 6 5 miles away by Montezuma Road)
- Website: www.townofmontezuma.com

The Town of Montezuma is a statutory town located in eastern Summit County, Colorado, United States. The town population was 74 at 2020 United States census. The town is a former mining camp that sits at an elevation of 10,200 feet (3,110 m), just west of the Continental Divide, nestled among mountains that reach an elevation of 12,000-13,000 feet (3,700-4,000 m) around it. It is situated in the upper valley of the Snake River above the ski resort of Keystone in the Rocky Mountains.

== Description ==
The town, which is named for Montezuma, the Emperor of the Aztecs, consists largely of historical buildings and houses lining unpaved streets at the end of the paved county road that ascends the Snake River from Keystone near the west side of Loveland Pass. The town sits in a high steep valley surrounded by forested peaks offering good access to higher national forest land destinations. The paved road up from Keystone leads mainly through national forest right up to the entrance of town, which is marked by a sign over the county road.

The town retains many older structures, some of them dating from the late 19th century, such as the picturesque school house dating from the 1880s, now a State of Colorado Historical Site. The town is often included in lists of ghost towns in the Colorado Rockies, but it nevertheless retains a small population of full-time residents, as well as many absentee homeowners.

From 2004 until 2009, a small low-powered FM station (KMZM 96.5 then 96.7), which was receivable only near and in the town, operated from one of the houses.

Montezuma has some of the most popular backcountry skiing, biking, snowmobiling, snowshoeing and hiking trails in Summit County. Montezuma is listed as one of Colorado's top scenic places in John Fielder's Best of Colorado.

== History ==
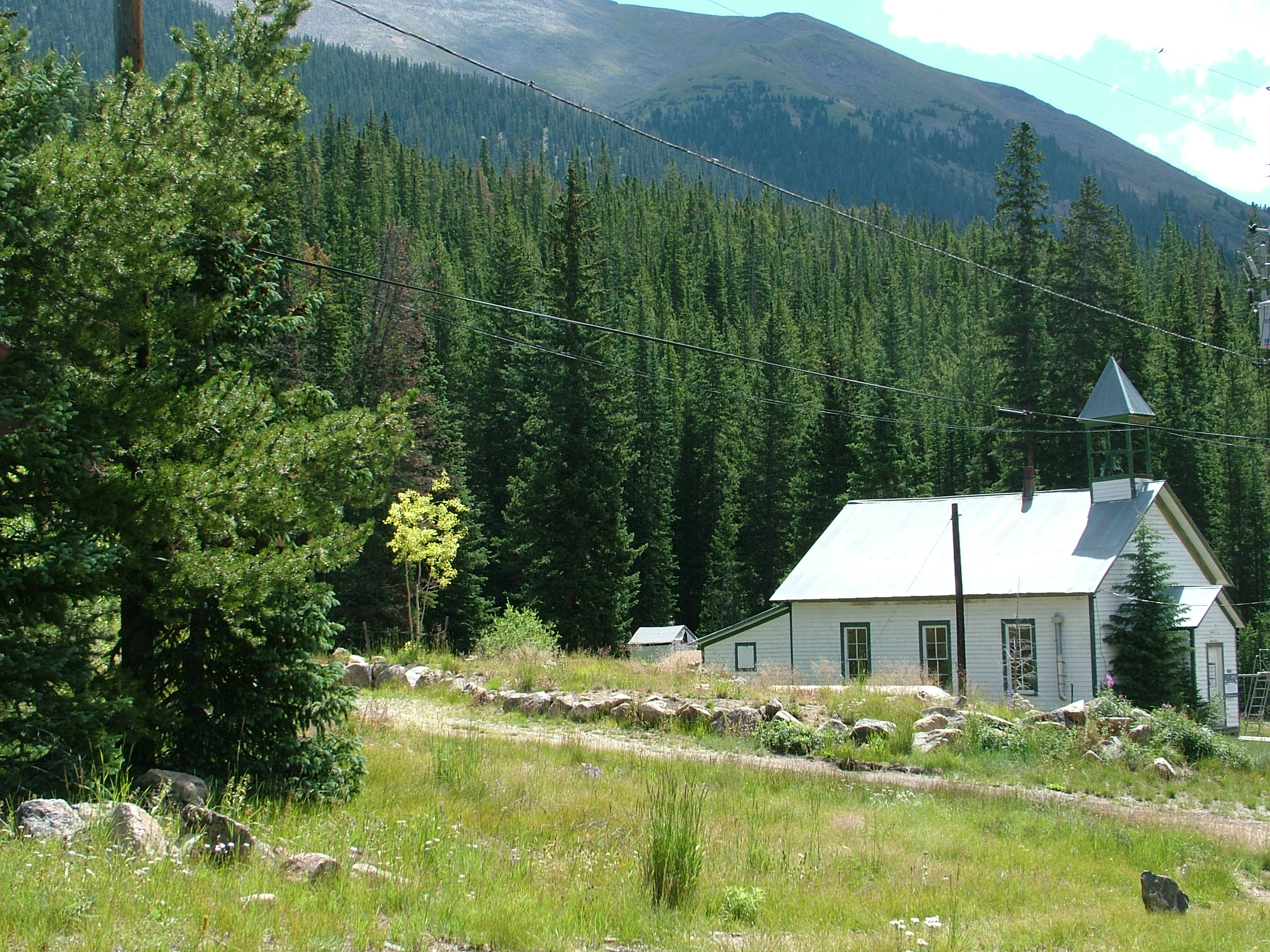
The Montezuma schoolhouse, where the children of Montezuma attended school from the late 1800s through the 1950s.

The town was founded in 1865 following the discovery of silver in the vicinity of nearby Argentine Pass. It was populated by prospectors coming over the passes from nearby Georgetown. The town was incorporated in 1881. A local newspaper, the Montezuma Mill Run, began publishing in 1882. In its inaugural issue, the Mill Run described the town as having two hotels, three stores, three saloons, two blacksmiths, one shoemaker, and a number of restaurants and boarding houses.

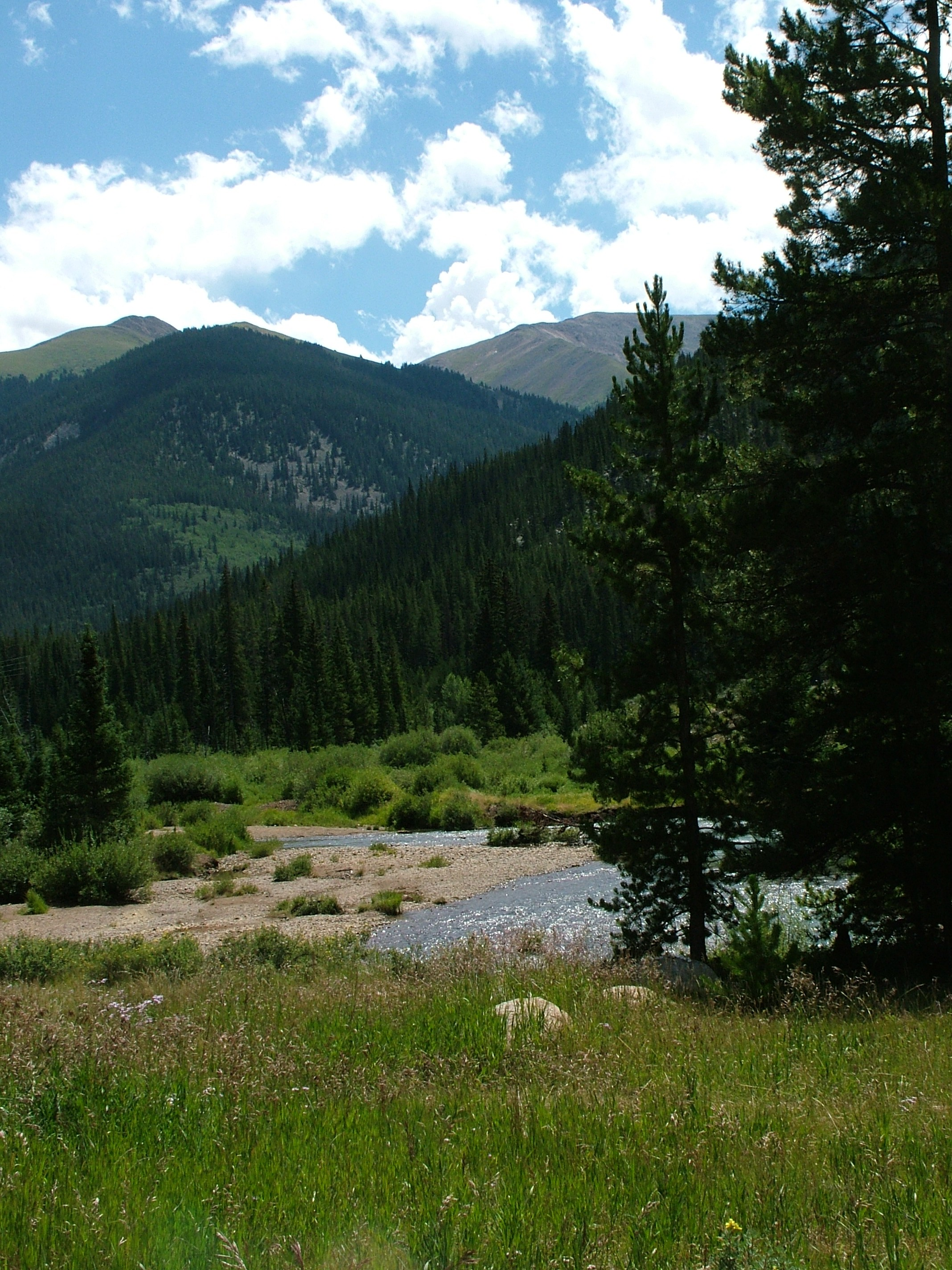
Between Keystone and Montezuma

In 1890, at the height of the Colorado Silver Boom, the population reached nearly 10,000. At the time, the town had two stores, a post office, two hotels (the Summit House and the Rocky Mountain House), and a sawmill. It eventually had a smelter, as well, which allowed local separation of the silver and lead ores, which are typically found together in the region. At the town's peak, the mountainside around the town was location of numerous mines on the Belle and Blance lodes, operated by the Sts. John Mining Company, after which the nearby ghost town of Saints John is named. Saints John now consists of three cabins near timberline, at 10,764 feet.

The town experienced a steep decline after the Silver Bust in 1893. It experienced a slight revival in mining interest in 1940, but has remained fairly quiet since World War II. The town has experienced five major fires throughout its history, including ones in 1949 and 1958 which destroyed many of the historic structures, including the Summit House, which burned in the fire of Christmas 1958. Other fires in the 1970s and 1980s destroyed additional historic buildings and businesses, leaving the town with little current economic base. Presently, the town is experiencing a high surge of interest as the value of real estate in proximity to ski areas and with access to wilderness increases substantially.

== Geography ==
At 10,200 feet (3,100 m) elevation, the town is among the few (perhaps just four) incorporated towns or cities in the United States at elevation higher than 10,000 feet (3,000 m).

According to the United States Census Bureau, the town has a total area of 0.1 square miles (0.26 km^{2}), all of it land.

=== Climate ===
Montezuma has a subarctic climate (Dfc) with short, mild summers and long, cold winters.

Climate data for Montezuma, Colorado
Month	Jan	Feb	Mar	Apr	May	Jun	Jul	Aug	Sep	Oct	Nov	Dec	Year
Record high °F (°C)	56 (13)	55 (13)	65 (18)	64 (18)	75 (24)	84 (29)	85 (29)	78 (26)	78 (26)	76 (24)	62 (17)	61 (16)	85 (29)
Mean daily maximum °F (°C)	33 (1)	34 (1)	38 (3)	44 (7)	53 (12)	64 (18)	70 (21)	68 (20)	61 (16)	51 (11)	40 (4)	33 (1)	49.1 (9.5)
Mean daily minimum °F (°C)	11 (−12)	11 (−12)	15 (−9)	22 (−6)	31 (−1)	40 (4)	45 (7)	43 (6)	36 (2)	28 (−2)	18 (−8)	11 (−12)	25.9 (−3.4)
Record low °F (°C)	−28 (−33)	−28 (−33)	−20 (−29)	−14 (−26)	2 (−17)	9 (−13)	27 (−3)	24 (−4)	9 (−13)	−9 (−23)	−21 (−29)	−23 (−31)	−28 (−33)
Average rainfall inches (mm)	0.72 (18)	0.93 (24)	1.93 (49)	2.55 (65)	1.98 (50)	1.93 (49)	2.70 (69)	3.01 (76)	1.64 (42)	1.36 (35)	1.38 (35)	1.01 (26)	21.14 (538)
Source: weather.com

== Demographics ==
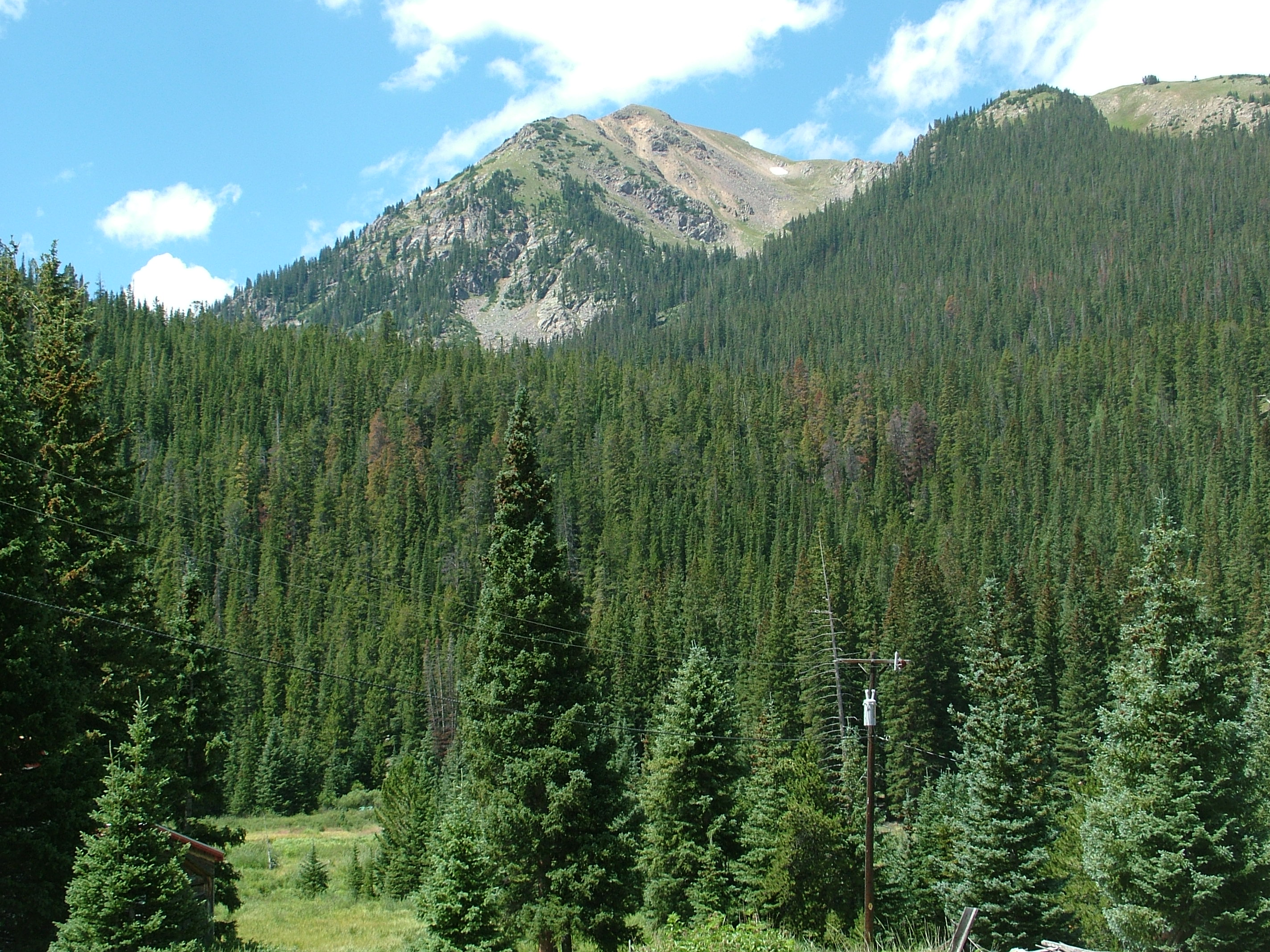
View of one of the mountains that encircle the town.

Historical population
Census	Pop.	Note	%±
1900	40		—
1910	134		235.0%
1920	69		−48.5%
1930	38		−44.9%
1940	59		55.3%
1950	48		−18.6%
1960	17		−64.6%
1990	60		—
2000	42		−30.0%
2010	65		54.8%
2020	74		13.8%

As of the census of 2000, there were 42 people, 20 households, and 6 families residing in the town. The population density was 548.4 inhabitants per square mile (211.7/km^{2}). There were 35 housing units at an average density of 457.0 per square mile (176.4/km^{2}). The racial make up of the city was 100% White. 2.4% of the population were Hispanic or Latino of any race.

There were 20 households, out of which 25.0% had children under the age of 18 living with them, 25.0% were married couples living together, and 70.0% were non-families. 35.0% of all households were made up of individuals, and none had someone living alone who was 65 years of age or older. The average household size was 2.10 and the average family size was 3.33.

In the town, the population was spread out, with 19.0% under the age of 18, 11.9% from 18 to 24, 50.0% from 25 to 44, 19.0% from 45 to 64. The median age was 36 years.

The median income for a household in the town was $38,750, and the median income for a family was $53,750. Males had a median income of $36,250 versus $16,250 for females. The per capita income for the town was $31,924.

== See also ==
- List of ghost towns in Colorado
