= Dillon, Colorado =

Town in Colorado, US

- Home rule town
- Town of Dillon
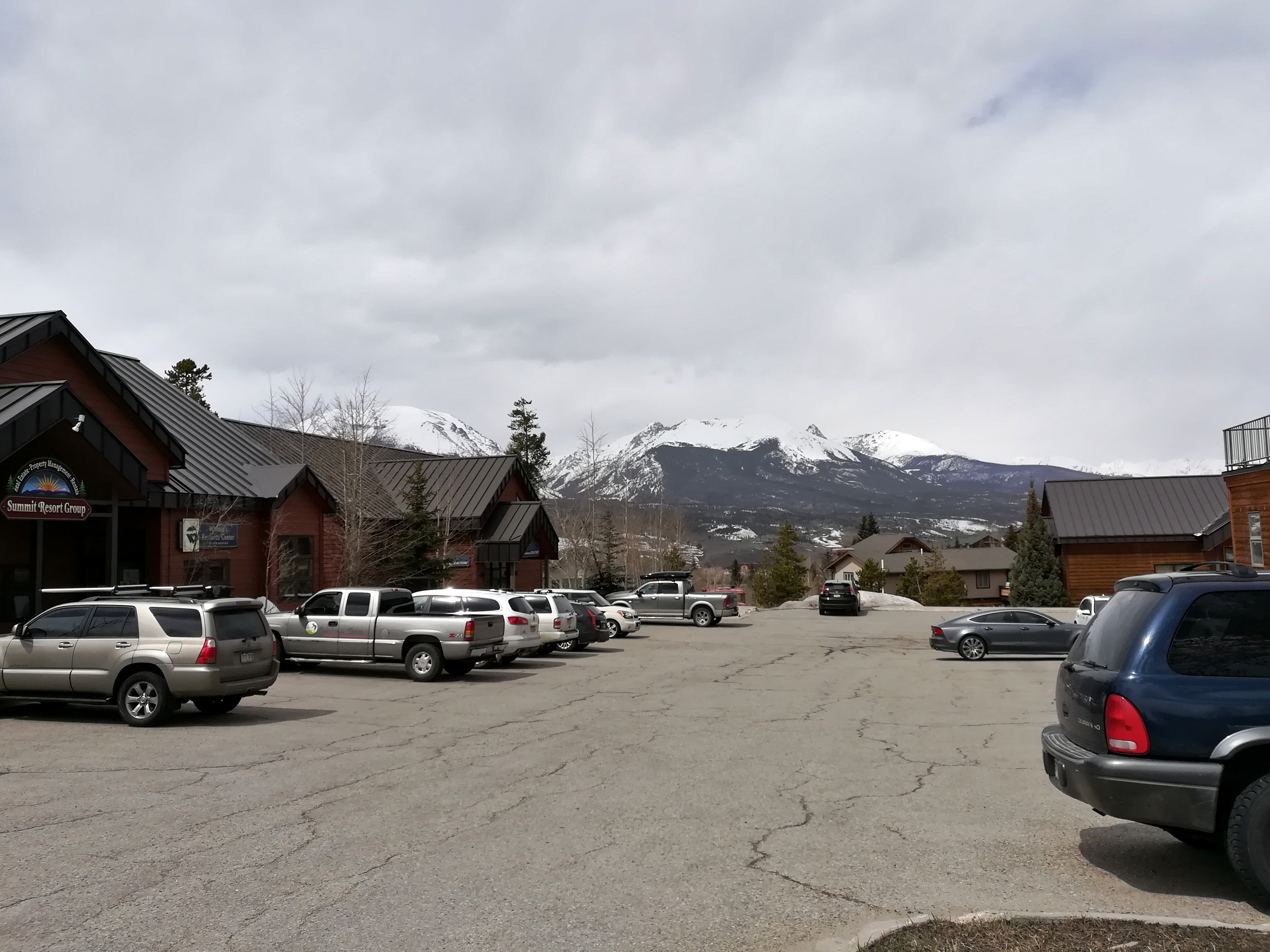
- Dillon, Colorado

- Location of the Town of Dillon in Summit County, Colorado
- Coordinates: 39°37′30″N 106°02′35″W
- Country: United States
- State: Colorado
- County: Summit
- Incorporated: January 26, 1883

Government
  - Type: home rule town
  - Mayor: Carolyn Skowyra

Area
  - Total: 2.324 sq mi (6.018 km^{2})
  - Land: 1.494 sq mi (3.869 km^{2})
  - Water: 0.830 sq mi (2.149 km^{2})
- Elevation: 9,111 ft (2,777 m)

Population (2020)
  - Total: 1,064
  - Density: 712/sq mi (275/km^{2})
- Time zone: UTC−07:00 (MST)
  - Summer (DST): UTC−06:00 (MDT)
- ZIP code: 80435
- Area codes: 970/748
- GNIS place ID: 169442
- GNIS town ID: 2412431
- FIPS code: 08-20440
- Website: www.townofdillon.com

Dillon is a home rule town located in Summit County, Colorado, United States. The town population was 1,064 at the 2020 United States census, a +17.70% increase since the 2010 United States census.

== History ==
The original town of Dillon was built as a stage stop and trading post on the northeast side of the Snake River. The town was named for Tom Dillon, a prospector. The Dillon, Colorado, post office opened on October 24, 1879, and the Town of Dillon was incorporated on January 26, 1883. By 1892, the town had been relocated twice, both times in order to be closer to railroad lines that were extended into the area. All three of these historic townsites were situated very close to the Blue River Valley confluence where the Snake River and Tenmile Creek flowed in, and this area is now referred to collectively as "Old Dillon".

During the Great Depression, Denver Water began acquiring land around Dillon. In 1956, residents and business owners in Dillon were notified that they would need to sell their property and move out, because Denver Water was about to begin construction on a dam just downstream from the town, and the resulting reservoir (which would help supply water to Front Range communities) was going to flood Dillon and the surrounding valley. About a mile to the north and approximately 160 feet (50 m) higher in elevation, some land on a hillside was set aside for the current townsite, which is now situated on the shoreline of Dillon Reservoir.

== Geography ==
At the 2020 United States census, the town had a total area of 1,487 acres (6.018 km^{2}) including 531 acres (2.149 km^{2}) of water. Dillon Dam and its reservoir (Lake Dillon) are adjacent. The continental divide is approximately ten miles (16 km) east.

=== Climate ===
According to the Köppen climate classification, Dillon has an alpine subarctic climate (Dfc). Summer days are usually warm, but with nights dropping close to freezing. Winter days are cold, with massive amounts of snowfall.

Climate data for Dillon, Colorado, 1991–2020 normals, extremes 1910–present
Month	Jan	Feb	Mar	Apr	May	Jun	Jul	Aug	Sep	Oct	Nov	Dec	Year
Record high °F (°C)	61 (16)	60 (16)	63 (17)	76 (24)	80 (27)	87 (31)	89 (32)	87 (31)	84 (29)	77 (25)	65 (18)	61 (16)	89 (32)
Mean maximum °F (°C)	46.3 (7.9)	48.4 (9.1)	55.3 (12.9)	62.9 (17.2)	71.1 (21.7)	78.9 (26.1)	82.2 (27.9)	80.0 (26.7)	76.1 (24.5)	69.0 (20.6)	57.7 (14.3)	48.5 (9.2)	82.5 (28.1)
Mean daily maximum °F (°C)	31.1 (−0.5)	33.4 (0.8)	40.5 (4.7)	47.5 (8.6)	57.6 (14.2)	69.1 (20.6)	75.0 (23.9)	72.5 (22.5)	66.2 (19.0)	54.1 (12.3)	41.1 (5.1)	31.7 (−0.2)	51.7 (10.9)
Daily mean °F (°C)	16.3 (−8.7)	18.5 (−7.5)	25.5 (−3.6)	32.8 (0.4)	41.8 (5.4)	50.8 (10.4)	56.6 (13.7)	54.7 (12.6)	47.9 (8.8)	37.4 (3.0)	26.2 (−3.2)	17.3 (−8.2)	35.5 (1.9)
Mean daily minimum °F (°C)	1.5 (−16.9)	3.6 (−15.8)	10.5 (−11.9)	18.1 (−7.7)	25.9 (−3.4)	32.6 (0.3)	38.1 (3.4)	36.9 (2.7)	29.7 (−1.3)	20.7 (−6.3)	11.4 (−11.4)	3.0 (−16.1)	19.3 (−7.0)
Mean minimum °F (°C)	−15.5 (−26.4)	−14.5 (−25.8)	−7.2 (−21.8)	3.8 (−15.7)	15.2 (−9.3)	25.0 (−3.9)	31.7 (−0.2)	31.0 (−0.6)	20.4 (−6.4)	5.9 (−14.5)	−7.7 (−22.1)	−14.5 (−25.8)	−19.2 (−28.4)
Record low °F (°C)	−44 (−42)	−45 (−43)	−38 (−39)	−25 (−32)	−8 (−22)	11 (−12)	22 (−6)	20 (−7)	4 (−16)	−17 (−27)	−30 (−34)	−46 (−43)	−46 (−43)
Average precipitation inches (mm)	0.95 (24)	0.99 (25)	1.15 (29)	1.42 (36)	1.34 (34)	1.13 (29)	1.87 (47)	1.91 (49)	1.40 (36)	0.98 (25)	0.88 (22)	0.87 (22)	14.89 (378)
Average snowfall inches (cm)	18.0 (46)	17.0 (43)	17.5 (44)	17.3 (44)	6.4 (16)	0.7 (1.8)	0.0 (0.0)	0.0 (0.0)	1.1 (2.8)	7.1 (18)	14.6 (37)	15.8 (40)	115.5 (292.6)
Average extreme snow depth inches (cm)	11.5 (29)	12.9 (33)	9.9 (25)	6.1 (15)	2.9 (7.4)	0.6 (1.5)	0.0 (0.0)	0.0 (0.0)	0.7 (1.8)	3.9 (9.9)	5.2 (13)	8.4 (21)	15.8 (40)
Average precipitation days (≥ 0.01 in)	11.7	11.3	11.3	11.3	9.6	8.3	11.9	13.5	9.9	8.1	9.5	10.9	127.3
Average snowy days (≥ 0.1 in)	9.7	9.6	9.4	8.8	3.0	0.4	0.0	0.0	0.5	3.7	8.0	9.1	62.2
Source 1: NOAA
Source 2: National Weather Service

== Demographics ==
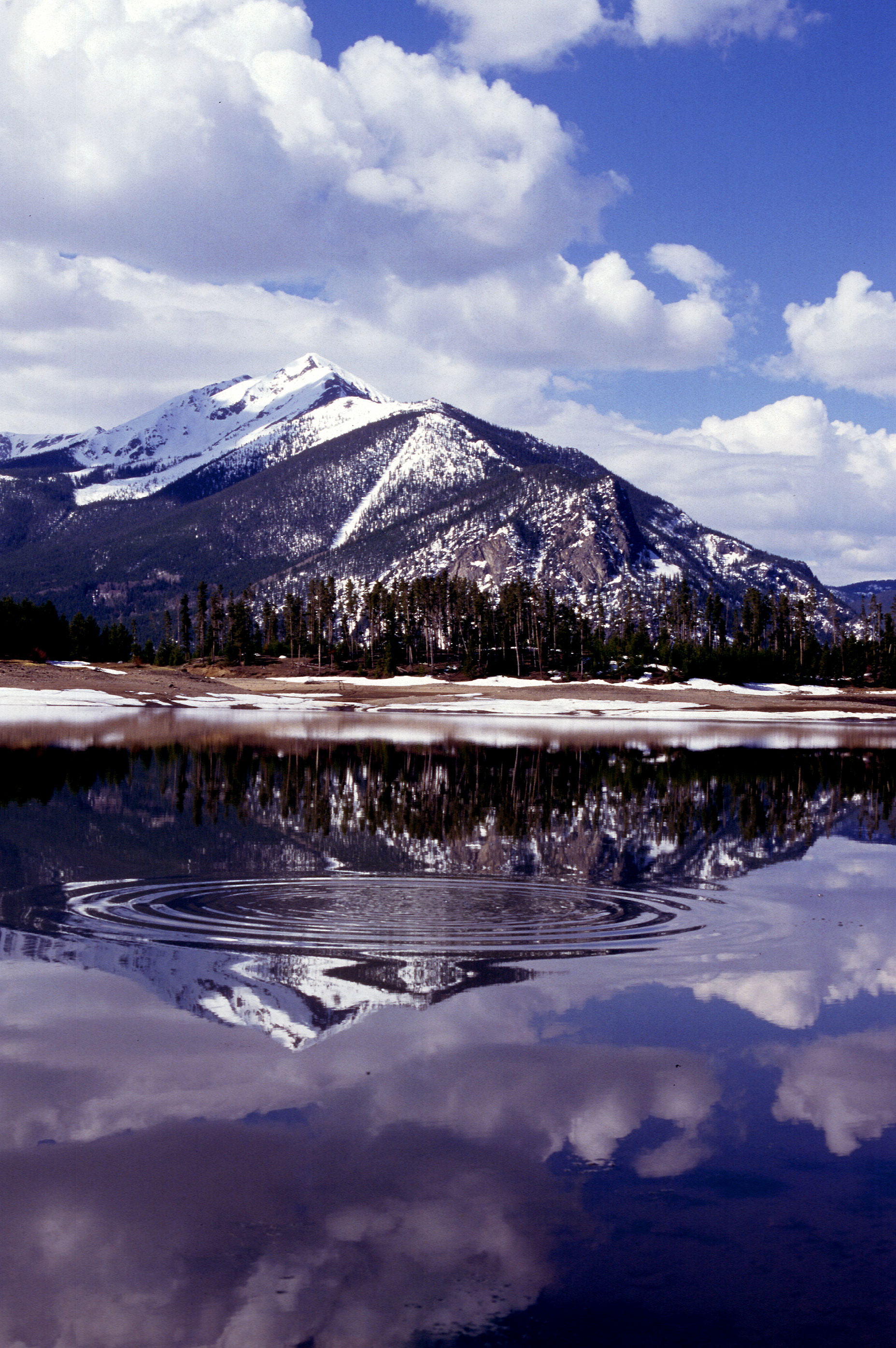
Spring snowmelt fills Lake Dillon.

Historical population
Census	Pop.	Note	%±
1890	133		—
1900	143		7.5%
1910	134		−6.3%
1920	126		−6.0%
1930	92		−27.0%
1940	161		75.0%
1950	191		18.6%
1960	814		326.2%
1970	182		−77.6%
1980	337		85.2%
1990	553		64.1%
2000	802		45.0%
2010	904		12.7%
2020	1,064		17.7%
U.S. Decennial Census

=== 2020 census ===
As of the 2020 census, Dillon had a population of 1,064. The median age was 41.6 years. 13.5% of residents were under the age of 18 and 16.9% of residents were 65 years of age or older. For every 100 females there were 118.9 males, and for every 100 females age 18 and over there were 116.0 males age 18 and over.

100.0% of residents lived in urban areas, while 0.0% lived in rural areas.

There were 519 households in Dillon, of which 21.4% had children under the age of 18 living in them. Of all households, 35.8% were married-couple households, 30.1% were households with a male householder and no spouse or partner present, and 24.1% were households with a female householder and no spouse or partner present. About 34.9% of all households were made up of individuals and 10.6% had someone living alone who was 65 years of age or older.

There were 1,369 housing units, of which 62.1% were vacant. The homeowner vacancy rate was 1.2% and the rental vacancy rate was 23.1%.

Racial composition as of the 2020 census
Race	Number	Percent
White	846	79.5%
Black or African American	19	1.8%
American Indian and Alaska Native	2	0.2%
Asian	3	0.3%
Native Hawaiian and Other Pacific Islander	4	0.4%
Some other race	98	9.2%
Two or more races	92	8.6%
Hispanic or Latino (of any race)	183	17.2%

=== 2000 census ===
As of the 2000 census, there were 802 people, 369 households, and 195 families residing in the town. The population density was 523.0 inhabitants per square mile (201.9/km^{2}). There were 1,280 housing units at an average density of 834.7 per square mile (322.3/km^{2}). The racial makeup of the town was 95.64% White, 0.87% African American, 1.00% Native American, 0.12% Asian, 1.87% from other races, and 0.50% from two or more races. Hispanic or Latino of any race were 10.35% of the population.

There were 369 households, out of which 21.4% had children under the age of 18 living with them, 42.5% were married couples living together, 7.3% had a female householder with no husband present, and 46.9% were non-families. 31.7% of all households were made up of individuals, and 6.0% had someone living alone who was 65 years of age or older. The average household size was 2.17 and the average family size was 2.62.

In the town, the population was spread out, with 15.5% under the age of 18, 10.8% from 18 to 24, 39.2% from 25 to 44, 25.6% from 45 to 64, and 9.0% who were 65 years of age or older. The median age was 37 years. For every 100 females, there were 123.4 males. For every 100 females age 18 and over, there were 125.2 males.

The median income for a household in the town was $49,821, and the median income for a family was $59,107. Males had a median income of $36,304 versus $26,042 for females. The per capita income for the town was $32,727. About 4.7% of families and 6.3% of the population were below the poverty line, including 9.2% of those under age 18 and 4.4% of those age 65 or over.

== Notable people ==
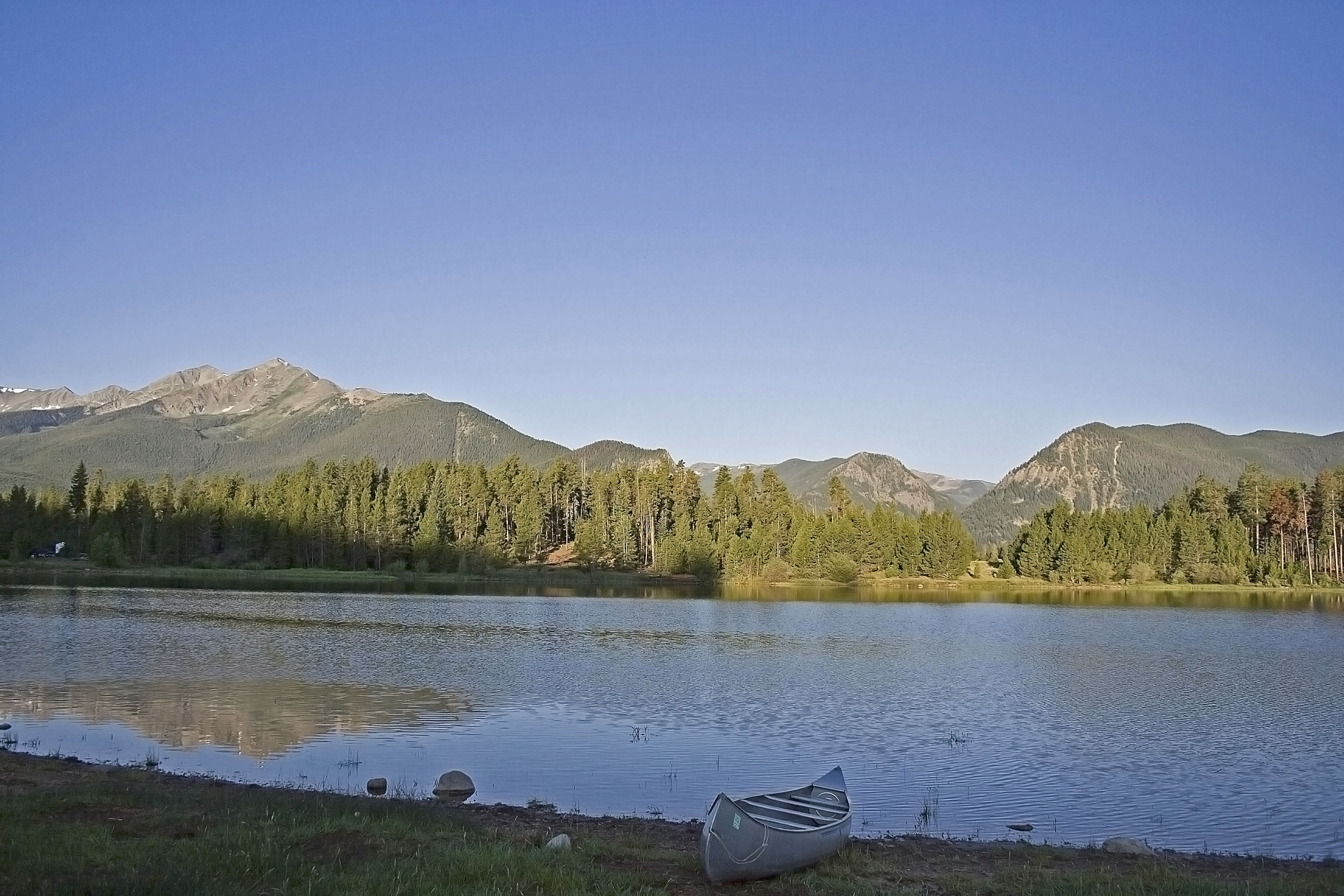
Lake Dillon in summer.

Notable individuals who were born in or have lived in Dillon include:

- Richard F. Bansemer, Lutheran pastor
- Frederic J. Brown III, U.S. Army lieutenant general
- Millie Hamner, Colorado state legislator
- Enid Markey (1894–1981), actress
- Julie McCluskie, member of the Colorado House of Representatives
- Duane D. Pearsall (1922–2010), smoke detector entrepreneur
- Christine Scanlan, Colorado state legislator

== See also ==
- Breckenridge, CO Micropolitan Statistical Area
- Dillon Amphitheater
