= List of municipalities in Colorado =

Coordinates: 38.9972°N 105.5478°W

The location of the State of Colorado in the United States of America

The 64 counties of the U.S. State of Colorado

The U.S. State of Colorado has 272 active municipalities, comprising 197 towns, 73 cities, and two consolidated city and county governments. (Note: 1. At the 2000 United States Census, the State of Colorado had 269 active municipalities, comprising 196 towns, 72 cities, and one consolidated city and county government.; 2. On February 7, 2001, the City of Centennial was incorporated.; 3. On November 15, 2001, the City of Broomfield became the City and County of Broomfield, increasing the number of Colorado counties to 64.; 4. On June 30, 2004, the Town of Watkins was incorporated, but on November 30, 2006, the Town of Watkins was dissolved.; 5. On November 6, 2007, the City of Castle Pines North was incorporated.; 6. Thus, at the 2010 United States Census, the State of Colorado had 271 active municipalities, comprising 196 towns, 73 cities, and two consolidated city and county governments.; 7. On November 2, 2010, the City of Castle Pines North changed its name to the City of Castle Pines.; 8. On November 4, 2014, the property owners of Carbonate, Colorado, voted to reactivate the Town of Carbonate.; 9. Thus, at the 2020 United States Census, the State of Colorado had 272 active municipalities, comprising 197 towns, 73 cities, and two consolidated city and county governments.; 10. On April 3, 2023, the Town of Keystone was incorporated.; 11. On November 7, 2023, voters approved a Home Rule Charter for the Town of Erie.; 12. On July 28, 2026, the Town of Hartman was declared abandoned.; 13. Thus, the State of Colorado continues to have 272 active municipalities, comprising 197 towns, 73 cities, and two consolidated city and county governments.) The City and County of Denver, the state capital, is the oldest and most populous municipality in Colorado. On December 3, 1859, the extralegal Territory of Jefferson granted a charter to the consolidated City of Denver, Auraria, and Highland. The Town of Keystone, incorporated on April 3, 2023, is the newest Colorado municipality. On July 28, 2026, the Colorado Secretary of State declared that the Town of Hartman had been abandoned after all the town trustees had resigned.

Colorado municipalities range in population from the City and County of Denver with a 2020 population of 715,522, to the Town of Carbonate, which has had no year-round population since the 1890 Census due to its severe winter weather and difficult access. (Note: For the most recent population estimates, see the List of Colorado municipalities by population.) The City of Black Hawk with a 2020 population of 127 is the least populous Colorado city, while the Town of Castle Rock with a 2020 population of 73,158 is the most populous Colorado town.

At the 2020 United States Census, 4,299,942 of the 5,773,714 Colorado residents (74.47%) lived in one of the 271 municipalities active at the time. (Note: The 2020 statistics exclude the Town of Carbonate and the Town of Keystone which were not active in 2020, but include the Town of Hartman which is no longer active.) Another 714,417 residents (12.37%) lived in one of the 210 census-designated places, while the remaining 759,355 residents (13.15%) lived in the many rural and mountainous areas of the state.

In 2020, only 1,968 square miles (5,097 km^{2}) of Colorado's 103,642 square miles (268,431 km^{2}) of land area (1.90%) were incorporated in the 271 active municipalities. The City of Colorado Springs with 195 square miles (506 km^{2}) of land area was the most extensive municipality, while the Town of Sawpit with 19 acres (0.078 km^{2}) of land area was the least extensive. The City of Glendale with a 2020 population density of 8,117 residents per square mile (3,134/km^{2}) was the most densely populated municipality, while the Town of Bonanza with a 2020 population density of 38 residents per square mile (15/km^{2}) was the least densely populated municipality after Carbonate.

== Municipal government ==
Colorado municipalities operate under various types of municipal governing authority — consolidated city and county, home rule municipality (which may be either a city and county, city, or a town), statutory city, statutory town, and territorial charter municipality. State law makes relatively few distinctions between a city and a town. The charter of a home rule municipality may designate either a city or town municipal title. In general, cities are more populous than towns, although long-term population changes may skew this considerably, as illustrated by the City of Black Hawk and the Town of Castle Rock.

Neither village nor civil township is a type of civil division in the State of Colorado. The cities of Cherry Hills Village and Greenwood Village and the towns of Log Lane Village, Mountain Village, and Snowmass Village have the word "village" at the end of their names.

Nineteen Colorado municipalities extend into two counties, while two cities – Aurora and Littleton – extend into three counties.

=== Consolidated city and county ===
In the State of Colorado, only Denver and Broomfield have consolidated city and county governments. The City and County of Denver operates under Article XX, Section 4 of the Constitution of the State of Colorado; and Title 30, Article 11, Section 101 of the Colorado Revised Statutes. Denver has an elected mayor and a city council of 13 members with 11 members elected from council districts and two members elected at large. The City and County of Broomfield operates under Article XX, Sections 10–13 of the Constitution of the State of Colorado. Broomfield has an appointed city and county manager, an elected mayor, and a city council of 11 members composed of the mayor and two members elected from each of five wards.

=== Home rule municipality ===
As of 2026, Colorado has 103 home rule municipalities, of which 62 are designated cities and 41 are designated towns. Home rule municipalities are self-governing under Article 20 of the Constitution of the State of Colorado; Title 31, Article 1, Section 202 of the Colorado Revised Statutes; and the home rule charter of each municipality. The state-authorized home rule charter determines the form of government. Home rule gives local municipalities the power to make legislation relevant to their areas, exercising control over issues of local concern while minimizing state intervention in municipal affairs.

=== Statutory city ===
As of 2026, Colorado has 11 statutory cities that operate under Title 31, Article 1, Section 203 and Article 4, Section 100 or Section 200 of the Colorado Revised Statutes. A statutory city must have a population of at least 2,000 at the time of incorporation or reorganization, although three have lost population since. Statutory cities have an elected mayor and a city council composed of the mayor and two members elected from each ward. A statutory city may petition to reorganize as a Section 200 statutory city with an appointed city manager and a city council with two members elected from each ward and one member elected at large. The mayor may be the city council member elected at large or the city council may appoint a mayor.

=== Statutory town ===
As of 2026, Colorado has 155 statutory towns that operate under Title 31, Article 1, Section 203 and Article 4, Part 3 of the Colorado Revised Statutes. The statutory town of Creede uses the official title "City of Creede". Likewise, Garden City, Lake City, Orchard City, and Sugar City are legally statutory towns and "city" is only a part of their names.

Statutory towns have an elected mayor and a board of trustees composed of the mayor and four or six additional members elected at large. Colorado statutory cities and towns are limited to exercising powers that are granted by the state and are subject to provisions and limitations imposed by the state and are similar to villages in other states such as the villages of the State of New York.

=== Territorial charter municipality ===
The Town of Georgetown is the only municipality that still operates under a charter granted by the Territory of Colorado. The town operates under Article 14, Section 13 of the Charter & Constitution of the Colorado Territory enacted on January 28, 1868. The town mayor is called the police judge, and the town council is called the board of selectmen.

== Active municipalities ==
For the most recent population data, see the List of Colorado municipalities by population.
Select the OpenStreetMap link at the right to view the location of these municipalities.
For the official municipal boundaries map, see the Colorado municipal boundaries map.

†	County seat
#	State capital

The 272 active municipalities of the U.S. State of Colorado
Municipality	Type of government	County (Note: Three Colorado county seats: Brighton, Central City, and Littleton, extend into adjacent counties.) (Note: The unincorporated community of Conejos, a census-designated place (CDP), is the seat of Conejos County. Conejos is the last unincorporated county seat in Colorado.)	Population			2020 land area	2020 population density	Date of incorporation
Municipality	Type of government	County	2020	2010	Change	2020 land area	2020 population density	Date of incorporation
Aguilar	Statutory town	Las Animas	456	538	−15.24%	0.392 sq mi 1.016 km^{2}	1162/sq mi 449/km^{2}	January 10, 1894
Akron† (Note: Akron has been the seat of Washington County, Colorado since the county was created on February 9, 1887.)	Statutory town	Washington	1,757	1,702	+3.23%	2.772 sq mi 7.180 km^{2}	634/sq mi 245/km^{2}	September 22, 1887
Alamosa† (Note: Alamosa has been the seat of Alamosa County, Colorado since the county was created on March 8, 1913.)	Home rule city	Alamosa	9,806	8,780	+11.69%	7.598 sq mi 19.679 km^{2}	1291/sq mi 498/km^{2}	August 12, 1878
Alma	Statutory town (Note: Located at an elevation of 10,361 feet (3,158 m), the Town of Alma, Colorado has been the highest elevation populated municipality in the United States since 1890.)	Park	296	270	+9.63%	0.434 sq mi 1.123 km^{2}	683/sq mi 264/km^{2}	December 2, 1873
Antonito	Statutory town	Conejos	647	781	−17.16%	0.427 sq mi 1.105 km^{2}	1516/sq mi 586/km^{2}	December 29, 1889
Arriba	Statutory town	Lincoln	202	193	+4.66%	0.499 sq mi 1.292 km^{2}	405/sq mi 156/km^{2}	August 29, 1918
Arvada	Home rule city	Jefferson, Adams	124,402	106,433	+16.88%	38.910 sq mi 100.776 km^{2}	3197/sq mi 1,234/km^{2}	August 24, 1904
Aspen† (Note: Aspen has been the seat of Pitkin County, Colorado since the county was created on February 23, 1881.)	Home rule city	Pitkin	7,004	6,658	+5.20%	3.858 sq mi 9.992 km^{2}	1815/sq mi 701/km^{2}	April 1, 1881
Ault	Statutory town	Weld	1,887	1,519	+24.23%	1.728 sq mi 4.476 km^{2}	1092/sq mi 422/km^{2}	April 11, 1904 (Note: Ault was originally incorporated on April 11, 1904 as the Town of Bergdorf.)
Aurora (Note: The City of Aurora is the 51st most populous U.S. municipality.) (Note: The City of Aurora is a principal city of the Denver-Aurora-Centennial, CO Metropolitan Statistical Area and the Denver-Aurora-Greeley, CO Combined Statistical Area.)	Home rule city	Arapahoe, Adams, Douglas	386,261	325,078	+18.82%	160.130 sq mi 414.734 km^{2}	2412/sq mi 931/km^{2}	May 5, 1903 (Note: Aurora was originally incorporated on May 5, 1903 as the Town of Fletcher.)
Avon	Home rule town	Eagle	6,072	6,447	−5.82%	8.349 sq mi 21.625 km^{2}	727/sq mi 281/km^{2}	February 24, 1978
Basalt	Home rule town	Eagle, Pitkin	3,984	3,857	+3.29%	1.991 sq mi 5.158 km^{2}	2000/sq mi 772/km^{2}	August 26, 1901
Bayfield	Statutory town	La Plata	2,838	2,333	+21.65%	1.646 sq mi 4.264 km^{2}	1724/sq mi 666/km^{2}	August 18, 1906
Bennett	Statutory town	Adams, Arapahoe	2,862	2,308	+24.00%	5.795 sq mi 15.008 km^{2}	494/sq mi 191/km^{2}	January 22, 1930
Berthoud	Statutory town	Larimer, Weld	10,332	5,105	+102.39%	12.933 sq mi 33.497 km^{2}	799/sq mi 308/km^{2}	August 28, 1888
Bethune	Statutory town	Kit Carson	183	237	−22.78%	0.162 sq mi 0.420 km^{2}	1128/sq mi 436/km^{2}	June 10, 1926
Black Hawk	Home rule city	Gilpin	127	118	+7.63%	2.653 sq mi 6.871 km^{2}	47.9/sq mi 18.5/km^{2}	June 12, 1886
Blanca	Statutory town	Costilla	322	385	−16.36%	1.833 sq mi 4.747 km^{2}	175.7/sq mi 67.8/km^{2}	May 18, 1910
Blue River	Statutory town	Summit	877	849	+3.30%	2.463 sq mi 6.379 km^{2}	356/sq mi 137/km^{2}	1961
Bonanza	Statutory town	Saguache	17	16	+6.25%	0.437 sq mi 1.133 km^{2}	38.9/sq mi 15.0/km^{2}	January 13, 1881 (Note: Bonanza was originally incorporated on January 13, 1881 as the Town of Bonanza City.)
Boone	Statutory town	Pueblo	305	339	−10.03%	0.379 sq mi 0.981 km^{2}	805/sq mi 311/km^{2}	September 22, 1956
Boulder† (Note: The City of Boulder is the principal city of the Boulder, CO Metropolitan Statistical Area.) (Note: On November 28, 1859, the Provisional Government of the Territory of Jefferson created 12 counties, with Boulder City as the seat of Jackson County, Jefferson Territory. On November 1, 1861, the new Territory of Colorado created 17 original counties, with Boulder City as the seat of Boulder County, Colorado Territory, and since statehood on August 1, 1876, Boulder has been the seat of Boulder County, Colorado.)	Home rule city	Boulder	108,250	97,385	+11.16%	26.327 sq mi 68.188 km^{2}	4112/sq mi 1,588/km^{2}	November 4, 1871 (Note: Boulder was originally incorporated by the Territory of Colorado on November 4, 1871 as the City of Boulder City.)
Bow Mar	Statutory town	Arapahoe, Jefferson	853	866	−1.50%	0.662 sq mi 1.714 km^{2}	1289/sq mi 498/km^{2}	August 1958
Branson	Statutory town	Las Animas	57	74	−22.97%	0.245 sq mi 0.634 km^{2}	232.9/sq mi 89.9/km^{2}	March 26, 1921
Breckenridge† (Note: The Town of Breckenridge is the principal city of the Breckenridge, CO Micropolitan Statistical Area.) (Note: On November 28, 1859, the Provisional Government of the Territory of Jefferson created 12 counties, with Breckenridge as the seat of Saratoga County, Jefferson Territory. On January 18, 1860, the spelling of the town's name was changed to Breckinridge in honor of U.S. Vice President John Cabell Breckinridge. On December 2, 1861, after John Breckinridge accepted a commission as a brigadier general in the Confederate States Army, the town changed its name back to the original Breckenridge. In 1862, county voters selected Breckenridge as the new seat of Summit County, Colorado Territory, and since statehood on August 1, 1876, the seat of Summit County, Colorado.)	Home rule town	Summit	5,078	4,540	+11.85%	6.047 sq mi 15.661 km^{2}	840/sq mi 324/km^{2}	March 3, 1880
Brighton† (Note: Brighton has been the seat of Adams County, Colorado since the county was created on November 15, 1902.)	Home rule city	Adams, (Note: The City of Brighton is the seat of Adams County, but extends into Weld County.); Weld	40,083	33,352	+20.18%	21.247 sq mi 55.030 km^{2}	1887/sq mi 728/km^{2}	September 1, 1887
Brookside	Statutory town	Fremont	236	233	+1.29%	0.474 sq mi 1.227 km^{2}	498/sq mi 192/km^{2}	1888
Broomfield† (Note: The City and County of Broomfield was consolidated on November 15, 2001.)	Consolidated city and county	Broomfield (Note: As a consolidated city and county, the City and County of Broomfield is its own county seat.)	74,112	55,889	+32.61%	32.968 sq mi 85.387 km^{2}	2248/sq mi 868/km^{2}	June 6, 1961 (Note: The City and County of Broomfield was consolidated on November 15, 2001.)
Brush	Statutory city	Morgan	5,339	5,463	−2.27%	2.831 sq mi 7.331 km^{2}	1886/sq mi 728/km^{2}	November 24, 1884
Buena Vista (Note: Buena Vista served as the seat of Chaffee County, Colorado from 1888 until 1928.)	Statutory town	Chaffee	2,855	2,617	+9.09%	3.452 sq mi 8.942 km^{2}	827/sq mi 319/km^{2}	November 8, 1879
Burlington† (Note: Burlington has been the seat of Kit Carson County, Colorado since the county was created on April 11, 1889.)	Home rule city	Kit Carson	3,172	4,254	−25.43%	2.152 sq mi 5.575 km^{2}	1474/sq mi 569/km^{2}	January 12, 1888
Calhan	Statutory town	El Paso	762	780	−2.31%	0.828 sq mi 2.144 km^{2}	921/sq mi 355/km^{2}	May 10, 1919
Campo	Statutory town	Baca	103	109	−5.50%	0.144 sq mi 0.374 km^{2}	713/sq mi 275/km^{2}	March 6, 1950
Cañon City† (Note: The City of Cañon City is a principal city of the Cañon City, CO Micropolitan Statistical Area and the Pueblo-Cañon City, CO Combined Statistical Area.) (Note: On November 1, 1861, the new Territory of Colorado created 17 original counties, with Cañon City as the seat of Fremont County, Colorado Territory, and since statehood on August 1, 1876, the seat of Fremont County, Colorado. Cañon City has also been spelled Canon City and Canyon City.)	Home rule city	Fremont	17,141	16,400	+4.52%	12.392 sq mi 32.095 km^{2}	1383/sq mi 534/km^{2}	April 3, 1872
Carbonate (Note: Carbonate served as the original seat of Garfield County, Colorado for several months after the county was created on February 10, 1883. On November 4, 2014, the property owners of Carbonate, Colorado voted 9 to 0 to reactivate the town government despite having no year-round residents since the 1890 United States census.)	Statutory town	Garfield	0	0	NA	0.992 sq mi 2.569 km^{2}	0/sq mi 0/km^{2}	April 13, 1883
Carbondale	Home rule town	Garfield	6,434	6,427	+0.11%	2.022 sq mi 5.237 km^{2}	3182/sq mi 1,229/km^{2}	April 26, 1888
Castle Pines	Home rule city	Douglas	11,036	10,360	+6.53%	9.594 sq mi 24.849 km^{2}	1150/sq mi 444/km^{2}	November 6, 2007 (Note: The City of Castle Pines North was incorporated on November 6, 2007. An election on November 2, 2010, changed the name to the City of Castle Pines.)
Castle Rock† (Note: In 1874, county voters selected Castle Rock as the new seat of Douglas County, Colorado Territory, and since statehood on August 1, 1876, the seat of Douglas County, Colorado.)	Home rule town	Douglas	73,158	48,231	+51.68%	34.290 sq mi 88.811 km^{2}	2134/sq mi 824/km^{2}	May 17, 1881
Cedaredge	Home rule town	Delta	2,279	2,253	+1.15%	1.961 sq mi 5.078 km^{2}	1162/sq mi 449/km^{2}	May 2, 1907
Centennial (Note: The City of Centennial is a principal city of the Denver-Aurora-Centennial, CO Metropolitan Statistical Area.)	Home rule city	Arapahoe	108,418	100,377	+8.01%	29.721 sq mi 76.976 km^{2}	3648/sq mi 1,408/km^{2}	February 7, 2001
Center	Statutory town	Saguache, Rio Grande	1,929	2,230	−13.50%	0.864 sq mi 2.238 km^{2}	2232/sq mi 862/km^{2}	January 18, 1907
Central City† (Note: On November 28, 1859, the Provisional Government of the Territory of Jefferson created 12 counties, with Central City as the seat of Mountain County, Jefferson Territory. On November 1, 1861, the new Territory of Colorado created 17 original counties, with Central City as the seat of Gilpin County, Colorado Territory, and since statehood on August 1, 1876, the seat of Gilpin County, Colorado. Central City uses the municipal title City of Central.)	Home rule city	Gilpin, (Note: The City of Central is the seat of Gilpin County, but extends into an uninhabited area of Clear Creek County.); Clear Creek	779	663	+17.50%	2.160 sq mi 5.594 km^{2}	361/sq mi 139/km^{2}	June 12, 1886
Cheraw	Statutory town	Otero	237	252	−5.95%	0.180 sq mi 0.467 km^{2}	1314/sq mi 507/km^{2}	April 17, 1917
Cherry Hills Village	Home rule city	Arapahoe	6,442	5,987	+7.60%	6.201 sq mi 16.061 km^{2}	1039/sq mi 401/km^{2}	July 19, 1945
Cheyenne Wells† (Note: Cheyenne Wells has been the seat of Cheyenne County, Colorado since the county was created on March 25, 1889.)	Statutory town	Cheyenne	758	846	−10.40%	1.070 sq mi 2.770 km^{2}	709/sq mi 274/km^{2}	May 14, 1890
Coal Creek (Note: The Town of Coal Creek should not be confused with the Coal Creek CDP.)	Statutory town	Fremont	364	343	+6.12%	1.194 sq mi 3.092 km^{2}	305/sq mi 118/km^{2}	February 11, 1882
Cokedale	Statutory town	Las Animas	127	129	−1.55%	0.205 sq mi 0.531 km^{2}	619/sq mi 239/km^{2}	March 15, 1948
Collbran	Statutory town	Mesa	369	708	−47.88%	0.558 sq mi 1.446 km^{2}	661/sq mi 255/km^{2}	July 22, 1908
Colorado Springs† (Note: The City of Colorado Springs is the 40th most populous U.S. municipality.) (Note: The City of Colorado Springs is the principal city of the Colorado Springs, CO Metropolitan Statistical Area.) (Note: In 1873, county voters selected Colorado Springs as the new seat of El Paso County, Colorado Territory, and since statehood on August 1, 1876, the seat of El Paso County, Colorado.)	Home rule city	El Paso	478,961	416,427	+15.02%	195.399 sq mi 506.082 km^{2}	2451/sq mi 946/km^{2}	June 19, 1886
Columbine Valley	Statutory town	Arapahoe	1,502	1,256	+19.59%	0.982 sq mi 2.543 km^{2}	1530/sq mi 591/km^{2}	July 2, 1959
Commerce City	Home rule city	Adams	62,418	45,913	+35.95%	36.002 sq mi 93.246 km^{2}	1734/sq mi 669/km^{2}	December 18, 1952 (Note: Commerce City was originally incorporated on December 18, 1952 as the Town of Commerce Town.)
Cortez† (Note: Cortez has been the seat of Montezuma County, Colorado since the county was created on April 16, 1889.)	Home rule city	Montezuma	8,766	8,482	+3.35%	6.230 sq mi 16.136 km^{2}	1407/sq mi 543/km^{2}	November 10, 1902
Craig† (Note: The City of Craig is a principal city of the Craig, CO Micropolitan Statistical Area and the Steamboat Springs-Craig, CO Combined Statistical Area.) (Note: On August 28, 1889, Yampa changed its name to Craig. Craig has been the seat of Moffat County, Colorado since the county was created on February 27, 1911.)	Home rule city	Moffat	9,060	9,464	−4.27%	5.073 sq mi 13.138 km^{2}	1786/sq mi 690/km^{2}	July 15, 1908
Crawford	Statutory town	Delta	403	431	−6.50%	0.251 sq mi 0.651 km^{2}	1603/sq mi 619/km^{2}	December 19, 1910
Creede† (Note: In 1892, two rival municipalities with the name Creede were incorporated in the Creede Mining District of southwestern Colorado. On March 19, 1892, the Town of Creede was incorporated around the Creede, Colorado, post office along Willow Creek in Saguache County. On June 13, 1892, the rival City of Creede was incorporated around the Amethyst, Colorado, post office just 1.1 miles (1.8 km) south along Willow Creek. On March 27, 1893, Mineral County was created, and on November 7, 1893, county voters selected the City of Creede as the new county seat. To avoid further confusion, the United States Post Office Department changed the name of the Creede post office to North Creede, Colorado, on November 28 1908, and changed the name of the Amethyst post office to Creede, Colorado, on February 9, 1909. As silver mining declined, both municipalities lost population, and in 1916, the City of Creede became a statutory town, but continued to use the appellation City of Creede to distinguish itself from its northern rival. On April 15, 1919, the North Creede post office closed, and the Town of Creede soon ceased operation. It was not until July 23, 2026, that the Colorado Secretary of State declared the Town of Creede abandoned. The Geographic Names Information System (GNIS) uses the name "Town of the City of Creede" to identify the county seat and sole surviving municipality of Mineral County.)	Statutory town	Mineral	257	290	−11.38%	0.950 sq mi 2.460 km^{2}	271/sq mi 104/km^{2}	May 19, 1892
Crested Butte	Home rule town	Gunnison	1,639	1,487	+10.22%	0.836 sq mi 2.166 km^{2}	1960/sq mi 757/km^{2}	July 15, 1880
Crestone	Statutory town	Saguache	141	127	+11.02%	0.385 sq mi 0.996 km^{2}	367/sq mi 142/km^{2}	January 24, 1902
Cripple Creek† (Note: Fremont changed its name to Morland on December 9, 1891; then changed it back to Fremont on February 4, 1892; then changed it to Cripple Creek on June 20, 1892. Cripple Creek has been the seat of Teller County, Colorado since the county was created on March 23, 1899.)	Statutory city	Teller	1,155	1,189	−2.86%	1.522 sq mi 3.941 km^{2}	759/sq mi 293/km^{2}	June 9, 1892
Crook	Statutory town	Logan	133	110	+20.91%	0.135 sq mi 0.349 km^{2}	987/sq mi 381/km^{2}	September 23, 1918
Crowley	Statutory town	Crowley	166	176	−5.68%	0.225 sq mi 0.584 km^{2}	736/sq mi 284/km^{2}	October 10, 1921
Dacono	Home rule city	Weld	6,297	4,152	+51.66%	8.790 sq mi 22.766 km^{2}	716/sq mi 277/km^{2}	September 23, 1908
De Beque	Statutory town	Mesa	493	504	−2.18%	2.727 sq mi 7.063 km^{2}	180.8/sq mi 69.8/km^{2}	January 18, 1890
Deer Trail	Statutory town	Arapahoe	1,068	546	+95.60%	1.175 sq mi 3.044 km^{2}	909/sq mi 351/km^{2}	February 3, 1920
Del Norte† (Note: On February 10, 1874, the Territory of Colorado created Rio Grande County, Colorado Territory with Del Norte as the original county seat, until statehood on August 1, 1876, when Del Norte became the seat of Rio Grande County, Colorado.)	Statutory town	Rio Grande	1,458	1,686	−13.52%	0.983 sq mi 2.547 km^{2}	1483/sq mi 572/km^{2}	November 15, 1895
Delta† (Note: Delta has been the seat of Delta County, Colorado since the county was created on February 11, 1883.)	Home rule city	Delta	9,035	8,915	+1.35%	13.274 sq mi 34.378 km^{2}	681/sq mi 263/km^{2}	October 24, 1882
Denver # (Note: The City and County of Denver is the 19th most populous U.S. municipality.) (Note: The City and County of Denver is the principal city of the Denver-Aurora-Centennial, CO Metropolitan Statistical Area and the Denver-Aurora-Greeley, CO Combined Statistical Area.) (Note: On August 24, 1859, voters of the Pike's Peak mining region approved the formation of the Provisional Government of the Territory of Jefferson with Denver City as the territorial capital. On November 28, 1859, the extralegal territory created 12 counties, with Denver City as the seat of Arrappahoe County, Jefferson Territory. On December 3, 1859, the Jefferson Territory granted a charter to the consolidated City of Denver, Auraria, and Highland, still commonly known as Denver City. On November 13, 1860, the Jefferson Territory moved its capital to Golden City. On February 28, 1861, U.S. President James Buchanan signed An Act to provide a temporary Government for the Territory of Colorado, which designated Denver City as the original capital of the Colorado Territory. On June 6, 1861, the Jefferson Territory officially yielded to the new territory. On November 1, 1861, the Colorado Territory created 17 original counties, with Denver City as the original seat of Arapahoe County. On November 7, 1861, the Colorado Territory reincorporated the city as the City of Denver City. On July 7, 1862, the Colorado Territory moved its capital to Colorado City. On February 13, 1866, the city shortened its name to the City of Denver. Denver served again as the capital of the Colorado Territory from December 9, 1867, until statehood on August 1, 1876, when Denver became the (first and only) capital of the State of Colorado. The City and County of Denver was consolidated on December 1, 1902.) (Note: Denver has retained its "Mile-High City" elevation of 5,280 feet (1,609.344 m) despite advances in scientific measurement. When the National Geodetic Survey makes adjustments to the North American Vertical Datum (NAVD), the State of Colorado moves the official mile-high elevation point up or down the west steps of the Colorado State Capitol to reflect the changes. Most of Denver actually lies above this elevation.)	Consolidated city and county	Denver (Note: As a consolidated city and county, the City and County of Denver is its own county seat.)	715,522	600,158	+19.22%	153.075 sq mi 396.463 km^{2}	4674/sq mi 1,805/km^{2}	December 3, 1859
Dillon	Home rule town	Summit	1,064	904	+17.70%	1.494 sq mi 3.869 km^{2}	712/sq mi 275/km^{2}	January 26, 1883
Dinosaur	Statutory town	Moffat	243	339	−28.32%	0.930 sq mi 2.408 km^{2}	261/sq mi 101/km^{2}	December 18, 1947 (Note: Dinosaur was originally incorporated on December 18, 1947 as the Town of Artesia.)
Dolores	Statutory town	Montezuma	885	936	−5.45%	0.664 sq mi 1.721 km^{2}	1332/sq mi 514/km^{2}	July 19, 1900
Dove Creek† (Note: Dove Creek has served as the seat of Dolores County, Colorado since 1945.)	Statutory town	Dolores	635	735	−13.61%	0.572 sq mi 1.483 km^{2}	1109/sq mi 428/km^{2}	June 15, 1939
Durango† (Note: The City of Durango is the principal city of the Durango, CO Micropolitan Statistical Area.) (Note: Durango has served as the seat of La Plata County, Colorado since 1881.)	Home rule city	La Plata	19,071	16,887	+12.93%	14.708 sq mi 38.093 km^{2}	1297/sq mi 501/km^{2}	April 27, 1881
Eads† (Note: Eads has served as the seat of Kiowa County, Colorado since 1902.)	Statutory town	Kiowa	672	609	+10.34%	0.478 sq mi 1.237 km^{2}	1407/sq mi 543/km^{2}	January 29, 1916
Eagle† (Note: Castle changed its name to Eagle on September 3, 1891. Eagle has served as the seat of Eagle County, Colorado since 1921.)	Home rule town	Eagle	7,511	6,508	+15.41%	5.641 sq mi 14.611 km^{2}	1331/sq mi 514/km^{2}	April 5, 1905
Eaton	Statutory town	Weld	5,802	4,365	+32.92%	3.160 sq mi 8.185 km^{2}	1836/sq mi 709/km^{2}	December 5, 1892
Eckley	Statutory town	Yuma	232	257	−9.73%	0.473 sq mi 1.225 km^{2}	491/sq mi 189/km^{2}	June 16, 1920
Edgewater	Home rule city	Jefferson	5,005	5,170	−3.19%	0.695 sq mi 1.799 km^{2}	7206/sq mi 2,782/km^{2}	November 5, 1904
Elizabeth	Statutory town	Elbert	1,675	1,358	+23.34%	1.999 sq mi 5.178 km^{2}	838/sq mi 323/km^{2}	October 9, 1890
Empire	Statutory town	Clear Creek	345	282	+22.34%	0.269 sq mi 0.695 km^{2}	1286/sq mi 496/km^{2}	April 12, 1882
Englewood	Home rule city	Arapahoe	33,659	30,255	+11.25%	6.564 sq mi 17.002 km^{2}	5127/sq mi 1,980/km^{2}	May 9, 1903
Erie	Home rule town	Weld, Boulder	30,038	18,135	+65.64%	19.737 sq mi 51.118 km^{2}	1522/sq mi 588/km^{2}	November 16, 1874
Estes Park	Statutory town	Larimer	5,904	5,858	+0.79%	6.822 sq mi 17.668 km^{2}	865/sq mi 334/km^{2}	April 17, 1917
Evans (Note: Evans served as the seat of Weld County, Colorado Territory from 1870 until 1874 and again from 1875 until statehood on August 1, 1876, when it became the seat of Weld County, Colorado until the following year.)	Home rule city	Weld	22,165	18,537	+19.57%	10.182 sq mi 26.372 km^{2}	2177/sq mi 840/km^{2}	November 15, 1885
Fairplay† (Note: On November 7, 1867, county voters selected Fair Play as the new seat of Park County, Colorado Territory, and since statehood on August 1, 1876, the seat of Park County, Colorado. On October 1, 1924, Fair Play changed its name to Fairplay, and has continued to serve as county seat.)	Statutory town	Park	724	679	+6.63%	1.147 sq mi 2.971 km^{2}	631/sq mi 244/km^{2}	November 15, 1872
Federal Heights	Home rule city	Adams	14,382	11,467	+25.42%	1.776 sq mi 4.599 km^{2}	8099/sq mi 3,127/km^{2}	May 19, 1940
Firestone	Statutory town	Weld	16,381	10,147	+61.44%	13.568 sq mi 35.141 km^{2}	1207/sq mi 466/km^{2}	October 8, 1908
Flagler	Statutory town	Kit Carson	567	561	+1.07%	1.370 sq mi 3.547 km^{2}	414/sq mi 160/km^{2}	November 2, 1916
Fleming	Statutory town	Logan	428	408	+4.90%	0.489 sq mi 1.267 km^{2}	875/sq mi 338/km^{2}	May 5, 1917
Florence	Statutory city	Fremont	3,822	3,881	−1.52%	4.276 sq mi 11.076 km^{2}	894/sq mi 345/km^{2}	September 13, 1887
Fort Collins† (Note: The City of Fort Collins is the principal city of the Fort Collins-Loveland, CO Metropolitan Statistical Area.) (Note: In 1868, county voters selected Fort Collins as the new seat of Larimer County, Colorado Territory, and since statehood on August 1, 1876, the seat of Larimer County, Colorado.)	Home rule city	Larimer	169,810	143,986	+17.94%	57.212 sq mi 148.179 km^{2}	2968/sq mi 1,146/km^{2}	February 12, 1883
Fort Lupton	Statutory city	Weld	7,955	7,377	+7.84%	12.146 sq mi 31.459 km^{2}	655/sq mi 253/km^{2}	January 15, 1890
Fort Morgan† (Note: The City of Fort Morgan is the principal city of the Fort Morgan, CO Micropolitan Statistical Area.) (Note: Fort Morgan has been the seat of Morgan County, Colorado since the county was created on February 19, 1889.)	Home rule city	Morgan	11,597	11,315	+2.49%	5.334 sq mi 13.815 km^{2}	2174/sq mi 839/km^{2}	June 15, 1887
Fountain	Home rule city	El Paso	29,802	25,846	+15.31%	22.501 sq mi 58.277 km^{2}	1324/sq mi 511/km^{2}	April 23, 1903
Fowler	Statutory town	Otero	1,253	1,182	+6.01%	0.559 sq mi 1.448 km^{2}	2241/sq mi 865/km^{2}	August 25, 1900
Foxfield	Statutory town	Arapahoe	754	685	+10.07%	1.323 sq mi 3.427 km^{2}	570/sq mi 220/km^{2}	December 15, 1994
Fraser	Statutory town	Grand	1,400	1,224	+14.38%	3.457 sq mi 8.953 km^{2}	405/sq mi 156/km^{2}	June 15, 1953
Frederick	Statutory town	Weld	14,513	8,679	+67.22%	15.096 sq mi 39.099 km^{2}	961/sq mi 371/km^{2}	September 9, 1908
Frisco	Home rule town	Summit	2,913	2,683	+8.57%	1.672 sq mi 4.331 km^{2}	1742/sq mi 673/km^{2}	December 3, 1880
Fruita	Home rule city	Mesa	13,395	12,646	+5.92%	7.892 sq mi 20.439 km^{2}	1697/sq mi 655/km^{2}	April 18, 1894
Garden City	Statutory town	Weld	254	234	+8.55%	0.113 sq mi 0.292 km^{2}	2253/sq mi 870/km^{2}	September 14, 1936
Genoa	Statutory town	Lincoln	153	139	+10.07%	0.310 sq mi 0.804 km^{2}	493/sq mi 190/km^{2}	July 27, 1905
Georgetown† (Note: In 1867, county voters selected Georgetown as the new seat of Clear Creek County, Colorado Territory, and since statehood on August 1, 1876, the seat of Clear Creek County, Colorado.)	Territorial charter municipality	Clear Creek	1,118	1,034	+8.12%	0.997 sq mi 2.583 km^{2}	1121/sq mi 433/km^{2}	January 28, 1868
Gilcrest	Statutory town	Weld	1,029	1,034	−0.48%	0.811 sq mi 2.100 km^{2}	1269/sq mi 490/km^{2}	March 18, 1912
Glendale	Home rule city	Arapahoe	4,613	4,184	+10.25%	0.568 sq mi 1.472 km^{2}	8117/sq mi 3,134/km^{2}	May 19, 1952
Glenwood Springs† (Note: On June 25, 1883, Defiance changed its name to Barlow, and several months later, county voters selected Barlow as the new seat of Garfield County, Colorado. On March 28, 1884, Barlow changed its name to Glenwood Springs, and Glenwood Springs continues to serve as county seat.)	Home rule city	Garfield	9,963	9,614	+3.63%	5.835 sq mi 15.114 km^{2}	1707/sq mi 659/km^{2}	September 4, 1885
Golden† (Note: On November 6, 1860, the Provisional Government of the Territory of Jefferson designated Golden City as the new seat of Jefferson County, Jefferson Territory, and on November 13, 1860, it designated Golden City as its new territorial capital. On November 1, 1861, the new Territory of Colorado created 17 original counties, with Golden City as the original seat of Jefferson County, Colorado Territory. Golden City served as the third capital of the Colorado Territory from August 14, 1862, until December 9, 1867. On June 27, 1876, Golden City shortened its name to Golden, and since statehood on August 1, 1876, Golden has been the seat of Jefferson County, Colorado.)	Home rule city	Jefferson	20,399	18,867	+8.12%	9.634 sq mi 24.953 km^{2}	2117/sq mi 817/km^{2}	January 2, 1871 (Note: Golden was originally incorporated by the Territory of Colorado on January 2, 1871 as the City of Golden City.)
Granada	Statutory town	Prowers	445	517	−13.93%	0.685 sq mi 1.775 km^{2}	649/sq mi 251/km^{2}	July 25, 1887
Granby	Statutory town	Grand	2,079	1,864	+11.53%	12.681 sq mi 32.845 km^{2}	163.9/sq mi 63.3/km^{2}	December 11, 1905
Grand Junction† (Note: The City of Grand Junction is the principal city of the Grand Junction, CO Metropolitan Statistical Area.) (Note: On May 26, 1882, Ute changed its name to Grand Junction. Grand Junction has been the seat of Mesa County, Colorado since the county was created on February 11, 1883.)	Home rule city	Mesa	65,560	58,566	+11.94%	39.634 sq mi 102.652 km^{2}	1654/sq mi 639/km^{2}	July 22, 1882
Grand Lake (Note: Grand Lake served as the seat of Grand County, Colorado from 1882 until 1888. On June 30, 1895, Grand Lake changed its name to Grandlake; then changed it back to Grand Lake on April 1, 1938.)	Statutory town	Grand	410	471	−12.95%	1.032 sq mi 2.672 km^{2}	397/sq mi 153/km^{2}	June 23, 1944
Greeley† (Note: The City of Greeley is the principal city of the Greeley, CO Metropolitan Statistical Area.) (Note: Greeley served as the seat of Weld County, Colorado Territory from 1874 until 1875. Greeley has served as the seat of Weld County, Colorado since 1877.)	Home rule city	Weld	108,795	92,889	+17.12%	48.933 sq mi 126.735 km^{2}	2223/sq mi 858/km^{2}	November 15, 1885
Green Mountain Falls	Statutory town	El Paso, Teller	646	640	+0.94%	1.099 sq mi 2.847 km^{2}	588/sq mi 227/km^{2}	August 19, 1880
Greenwood Village	Home rule city	Arapahoe	15,691	13,925	+12.68%	8.267 sq mi 21.412 km^{2}	1898/sq mi 733/km^{2}	September 19, 1950
Grover	Statutory town	Weld	157	137	+14.60%	0.595 sq mi 1.542 km^{2}	264/sq mi 102/km^{2}	October 6, 1916
Gunnison† (Note: Gunnison has been the seat of Gunnison County, Colorado since the county was created on March 9, 1877.)	Home rule city	Gunnison	6,560	5,854	+12.06%	4.849 sq mi 12.558 km^{2}	1353/sq mi 522/km^{2}	March 1, 1880
Gypsum	Home rule town	Eagle	8,040	6,477	+24.13%	8.851 sq mi 22.924 km^{2}	908/sq mi 351/km^{2}	November 25, 1911
Haswell	Statutory town	Kiowa	71	68	+4.41%	0.803 sq mi 2.079 km^{2}	88.5/sq mi 34.2/km^{2}	September 2, 1920
Haxtun	Statutory town	Phillips	981	946	+3.70%	0.595 sq mi 1.542 km^{2}	1648/sq mi 636/km^{2}	July 30, 1909
Hayden (Note: On January 29, 1877, the state created Routt County, Colorado and designated Hayden as the original county seat. Hayden served as county seat until 1878.)	Home rule town	Routt	1,941	1,810	+7.24%	3.278 sq mi 8.490 km^{2}	592/sq mi 229/km^{2}	May 5, 1906
Hillrose	Statutory town	Morgan	312	264	+18.18%	0.189 sq mi 0.488 km^{2}	1656/sq mi 639/km^{2}	May 20, 1919
Holly	Statutory town	Prowers	837	802	+4.36%	0.723 sq mi 1.874 km^{2}	1157/sq mi 447/km^{2}	September 4, 1903
Holyoke† (Note: Holyoke has been the seat of Phillips County, Colorado since the county was created on March 27, 1889.)	Home rule city	Phillips	2,346	2,313	+1.43%	2.470 sq mi 6.396 km^{2}	950/sq mi 367/km^{2}	May 31, 1888
Hooper	Statutory town	Alamosa	81	103	−21.36%	0.252 sq mi 0.653 km^{2}	321/sq mi 124/km^{2}	May 20, 1898
Hot Sulphur Springs† (Note: Hot Sulphur Springs served as the original seat of Grand County, Colorado Territory since the county was created on February 2, 1874, and with statehood on August 1, 1876, the seat of Grand County, Colorado until 1882 and then again from 1888 to present. On June 26, 1894, Hot Sulphur Springs changed its name to Sulphur Springs, then changed it back to Hot Sulphur Springs on February 15, 1912.)	Statutory town	Grand	687	663	+3.62%	0.769 sq mi 1.992 km^{2}	893/sq mi 345/km^{2}	April 1, 1903
Hotchkiss	Statutory town	Delta	875	944	−7.31%	0.926 sq mi 2.399 km^{2}	945/sq mi 365/km^{2}	March 14, 1901
Hudson	Statutory town	Weld	1,651	2,356	−29.92%	5.896 sq mi 15.271 km^{2}	280/sq mi 108/km^{2}	April 2, 1914
Hugo† (Note: Hugo has been the seat of Lincoln County, Colorado since the county was created on April 11, 1889.)	Statutory town	Lincoln	787	730	+7.81%	0.912 sq mi 2.362 km^{2}	863/sq mi 333/km^{2}	June 21, 1909
Idaho Springs (Note: On November 1, 1861, the Territory of Colorado created 17 original counties, with Idaho as the original seat of Clear Creek County, Colorado Territory, serving until 1867. On April 7, 1876, Idaho changed its name to Idaho Springs.)	Statutory city	Clear Creek	1,782	1,717	+3.79%	2.253 sq mi 5.835 km^{2}	791/sq mi 305/km^{2}	November 15, 1885
Ignacio (Note: Ignacio is the headquarters of the Southern Ute Indian Tribe.)	Statutory town	La Plata	852	697	+22.24%	0.512 sq mi 1.325 km^{2}	1665/sq mi 643/km^{2}	July 7, 1913
Iliff	Statutory town	Logan	246	266	−7.52%	0.191 sq mi 0.495 km^{2}	1287/sq mi 497/km^{2}	February 20, 1906
Jamestown	Statutory town	Boulder	256	274	−6.57%	0.575 sq mi 1.489 km^{2}	445/sq mi 172/km^{2}	June 22, 1883
Johnstown	Home rule town	Weld, Larimer	17,303	9,887	+75.01%	13.792 sq mi 35.722 km^{2}	1255/sq mi 484/km^{2}	May 13, 1907
Julesburg† (Note: On May 26, 1886, Denver Junction changed its name to Julesburg. Julesburg has been the seat of Sedgwick County, Colorado since the county was created on April 9, 1889.)	Statutory town	Sedgwick	1,307	1,225	+6.69%	1.512 sq mi 3.916 km^{2}	864/sq mi 334/km^{2}	November 18, 1886
Keenesburg	Statutory town	Weld	1,250	1,127	+10.91%	7.540 sq mi 19.529 km^{2}	165.8/sq mi 64.0/km^{2}	June 4, 1919
Kersey	Statutory town	Weld	1,495	1,454	+2.82%	2.022 sq mi 5.236 km^{2}	740/sq mi 286/km^{2}	December 3, 1908
Keystone (Note: Keystone population and area prior to April 3, 2023, are for the Keystone CDP.)	Home rule town	Summit	1,369	1,079	+26.88%	41.402 sq mi 107.230 km^{2}	33.1/sq mi 12.8/km^{2}	April 3, 2023
Kim	Statutory town	Las Animas	63	74	−14.86%	0.379 sq mi 0.981 km^{2}	166.3/sq mi 64.2/km^{2}	1974
Kiowa† (Note: On February 2, 1874, the Territory of Colorado created Elbert County, Colorado Territory, with Kiowa as the county seat, and since statehood on August 1, 1876, the seat of Elbert County, Colorado.)	Home rule town	Elbert	725	723	+0.28%	0.862 sq mi 2.231 km^{2}	842/sq mi 325/km^{2}	December 30, 1912
Kit Carson (Note: Kit Carson served as the seat of Greenwood County, Colorado Territory for the four years it existed from February 11, 1870, until February 6, 1874.)	Statutory town	Cheyenne	255	233	+9.44%	0.584 sq mi 1.513 km^{2}	437/sq mi 169/km^{2}	July 13, 1931
Kremmling	Statutory town	Grand	1,509	1,444	+4.50%	1.308 sq mi 3.389 km^{2}	1153/sq mi 445/km^{2}	May 14, 1904
La Jara	Statutory town	Conejos	730	818	−10.76%	0.408 sq mi 1.056 km^{2}	1790/sq mi 691/km^{2}	November 11, 1910
La Junta† (Note: La Junta has been the seat of Otero County, Colorado since the county was created on March 25, 1889.)	Home rule city	Otero	7,322	7,077	+3.46%	3.186 sq mi 8.252 km^{2}	2298/sq mi 887/km^{2}	April 23, 1881
La Veta	Statutory town	Huerfano	862	800	+7.75%	1.367 sq mi 3.539 km^{2}	631/sq mi 244/km^{2}	June 16, 1886
Lafayette	Home rule city	Boulder	30,411	24,453	+24.37%	9.223 sq mi 23.888 km^{2}	3297/sq mi 1,273/km^{2}	January 6, 1890
Lake City† (Note: In 1875, county voters selected Lake City as the new seat of Hinsdale County, Colorado Territory, and since statehood on August 1, 1876, the seat of Hinsdale County, Colorado.)	Statutory town	Hinsdale	432	408	+5.88%	0.828 sq mi 2.144 km^{2}	522/sq mi 201/km^{2}	September 19, 1884
Lakeside (Note: The present Town of Lakeside in Jefferson County should not be confused with the former Town of Lakeside in Summit County.)	Statutory town	Jefferson	16	8	+100.00%	0.188 sq mi 0.486 km^{2}	85.3/sq mi 32.9/km^{2}	November 25, 1907
Lakewood	Home rule city	Jefferson	155,984	142,980	+9.09%	43.473 sq mi 112.595 km^{2}	3588/sq mi 1,385/km^{2}	June 24, 1969
Lamar† (Note: Lamar has been the seat of Prowers County, Colorado since the county was created on April 11, 1889.)	Home rule city	Prowers	7,687	7,804	−1.50%	5.212 sq mi 13.500 km^{2}	1475/sq mi 569/km^{2}	December 5, 1886
Larkspur	Home rule town	Douglas	206	183	+12.57%	1.591 sq mi 4.120 km^{2}	129.5/sq mi 50.0/km^{2}	1979
Las Animas† (Note: On February 11, 1870, the Territory of Colorado created Bent County, Colorado Territory, with Las Animas serving as the original county seat for only a few months. Las Animas served as county seat again from 1872 until 1875, when the county seat was moved to West Las Animas. With statehood on August 1, 1876, West Las Animas became the seat of Bent County, Colorado. On September 4, 1886, West Las Animas changed its name to Las Animas, and Las Animas has served as the county seat since.)	Statutory city	Bent	2,300	2,410	−4.56%	1.626 sq mi 4.212 km^{2}	1414/sq mi 546/km^{2}	May 15, 1886
LaSalle	Statutory town	Weld	2,359	1,955	+20.66%	0.958 sq mi 2.480 km^{2}	2464/sq mi 951/km^{2}	1910 (Note: LaSalle was originally incorporated in 1910 as the Town of La Salle.)
Leadville† (Note: Leadville has served as the seat of Lake County, Colorado since it was re-created on February 10, 1879.)	Statutory city	Lake	2,633	2,602	+1.19%	1.174 sq mi 3.039 km^{2}	2244/sq mi 866/km^{2}	February 18, 1878
Limon	Statutory town	Lincoln	2,043	1,880	+8.67%	3.162 sq mi 8.190 km^{2}	646/sq mi 249/km^{2}	November 18, 1909
Littleton† (Note: Voters selected Littleton as the seat of South Arapahoe County, Colorado, which was renamed and re-created on November 15, 1902. Littleton has remained the seat since the county name was changed back to Arapahoe County, Colorado on April 11, 1903.)	Home rule city	Arapahoe, (Note: The City of Littleton is the seat of Arapahoe County, but extends into both Jefferson and Douglas counties.); Jefferson, Douglas	45,652	41,737	+9.38%	12.629 sq mi 32.709 km^{2}	3615/sq mi 1,396/km^{2}	March 13, 1890
Lochbuie	Statutory town	Weld, Adams	8,088	4,726	+71.14%	3.685 sq mi 9.543 km^{2}	2195/sq mi 848/km^{2}	May 1974
Log Lane Village	Statutory town	Morgan	913	873	+4.58%	0.196 sq mi 0.508 km^{2}	4655/sq mi 1,797/km^{2}	June 12, 1956
Lone Tree	Home rule city	Douglas	14,253	10,218	+39.49%	9.808 sq mi 25.403 km^{2}	1453/sq mi 561/km^{2}	November 1995
Longmont	Home rule city	Boulder, Weld	98,885	86,270	+14.62%	28.778 sq mi 74.536 km^{2}	3436/sq mi 1,327/km^{2}	November 15, 1885
Louisville	Home rule city	Boulder	21,226	18,376	+15.51%	7.964 sq mi 20.626 km^{2}	2665/sq mi 1,029/km^{2}	June 3, 1882
Loveland (Note: The City of Loveland is a principal city of the Fort Collins-Loveland, CO Metropolitan Statistical Area.)	Home rule city	Larimer	76,378	66,859	+14.24%	34.419 sq mi 89.146 km^{2}	2219/sq mi 857/km^{2}	April 30, 1881
Lyons	Statutory town	Boulder	2,209	2,033	+8.66%	1.349 sq mi 3.493 km^{2}	1638/sq mi 632/km^{2}	April 10, 1891
Manassa	Statutory town	Conejos	947	991	−4.44%	0.931 sq mi 2.412 km^{2}	1017/sq mi 393/km^{2}	June 6, 1889
Mancos	Statutory town	Montezuma	1,196	1,336	−10.48%	0.642 sq mi 1.662 km^{2}	1864/sq mi 720/km^{2}	November 30, 1894
Manitou Springs	Home rule city	El Paso	4,858	4,992	−2.68%	3.149 sq mi 8.157 km^{2}	1542/sq mi 596/km^{2}	January 25, 1888
Manzanola	Statutory town	Otero	341	434	−21.43%	0.284 sq mi 0.736 km^{2}	1200/sq mi 463/km^{2}	July 9, 1900
Marble	Statutory town	Gunnison	133	131	+1.53%	0.360 sq mi 0.932 km^{2}	370/sq mi 143/km^{2}	1899
Mead	Statutory town	Weld	4,781	3,405	+40.41%	13.001 sq mi 33.672 km^{2}	368/sq mi 142/km^{2}	March 17, 1908
Meeker† (Note: Meeker has been the seat of Rio Blanco County, Colorado since the county was created on March 25, 1889.)	Statutory town	Rio Blanco	2,374	2,475	−4.08%	3.589 sq mi 9.295 km^{2}	661/sq mi 255/km^{2}	November 10, 1885
Merino	Statutory town	Logan	281	284	−1.06%	0.152 sq mi 0.393 km^{2}	1852/sq mi 715/km^{2}	January 4, 1917
Milliken	Statutory town	Weld	8,386	5,610	+49.48%	12.815 sq mi 33.191 km^{2}	654/sq mi 253/km^{2}	October 1, 1910
Minturn	Home rule town	Eagle	1,033	1,027	+0.58%	8.018 sq mi 20.766 km^{2}	128.8/sq mi 49.7/km^{2}	November 23, 1904
Moffat	Statutory town	Saguache	108	116	−6.90%	1.666 sq mi 4.314 km^{2}	64.8/sq mi 25.0/km^{2}	April 20, 1911
Monte Vista	Home rule city	Rio Grande	4,247	4,444	−4.43%	2.633 sq mi 6.820 km^{2}	1613/sq mi 623/km^{2}	September 27, 1886
Montezuma	Statutory town	Summit	74	65	+13.85%	0.079 sq mi 0.205 km^{2}	935/sq mi 361/km^{2}	1881
Montrose† (Note: The City of Montrose is the principal city of the Montrose, CO Micropolitan Statistical Area.) (Note: Montrose has been the seat of Montrose County, Colorado since the county was created on February 11, 1883.)	Home rule city	Montrose	20,291	19,132	+6.06%	18.477 sq mi 47.854 km^{2}	1098/sq mi 424/km^{2}	May 1, 1882
Monument	Home rule town	El Paso	10,399	5,530	+88.05%	6.843 sq mi 17.724 km^{2}	1520/sq mi 587/km^{2}	May 14, 1881
Morrison	Home rule town	Jefferson	396	428	−7.48%	1.645 sq mi 4.260 km^{2}	240.8/sq mi 93.0/km^{2}	January 29, 1906
Mount Crested Butte	Home rule town	Gunnison	941	801	+17.48%	2.068 sq mi 5.355 km^{2}	455/sq mi 176/km^{2}	1974
Mountain View	Home rule town	Jefferson	541	507	+6.71%	0.093 sq mi 0.241 km^{2}	5814/sq mi 2,245/km^{2}	October 11, 1904
Mountain Village	Home rule town	San Miguel	1,264	1,320	−4.24%	3.300 sq mi 8.547 km^{2}	383/sq mi 148/km^{2}	March 10, 1995
Naturita	Statutory town	Montrose	485	546	−11.17%	0.615 sq mi 1.594 km^{2}	788/sq mi 304/km^{2}	November 30, 1951
Nederland	Statutory town	Boulder	1,471	1,445	+1.80%	1.480 sq mi 3.833 km^{2}	994/sq mi 384/km^{2}	November 15, 1885
New Castle	Home rule town	Garfield	4,923	4,518	+8.96%	2.517 sq mi 6.520 km^{2}	1956/sq mi 755/km^{2}	March 27, 1890
Northglenn	Home rule city	Adams, Weld	38,131	35,789	+6.54%	7.359 sq mi 19.058 km^{2}	5182/sq mi 2,001/km^{2}	April 19, 1969
Norwood	Statutory town	San Miguel	535	518	+3.28%	0.283 sq mi 0.733 km^{2}	1890/sq mi 730/km^{2}	August 20, 1903
Nucla	Statutory town	Montrose	585	711	−17.72%	0.694 sq mi 1.797 km^{2}	843/sq mi 326/km^{2}	March 14, 1915
Nunn	Statutory town	Weld	504	416	+21.15%	3.964 sq mi 10.267 km^{2}	127.1/sq mi 49.1/km^{2}	March 28, 1908
Oak Creek	Statutory town	Routt	889	884	+0.57%	0.356 sq mi 0.922 km^{2}	2497/sq mi 964/km^{2}	December 26, 1907
Olathe	Statutory town	Montrose	2,019	1,849	+9.19%	1.502 sq mi 3.890 km^{2}	1344/sq mi 519/km^{2}	October 16, 1907
Olney Springs	Statutory town	Crowley	315	345	−8.70%	0.241 sq mi 0.623 km^{2}	1310/sq mi 506/km^{2}	May 27, 1912
Ophir	Home rule town	San Miguel	197	159	+23.90%	0.235 sq mi 0.609 km^{2}	838/sq mi 323/km^{2}	1881
Orchard City	Statutory town	Delta	3,142	3,119	+0.74%	11.521 sq mi 29.840 km^{2}	273/sq mi 105/km^{2}	May 25, 1912
Ordway† (Note: Ordway has been the seat of Crowley County, Colorado since the county was created on May 29, 1911.)	Statutory town	Crowley	1,066	1,080	−1.30%	0.771 sq mi 1.998 km^{2}	1382/sq mi 534/km^{2}	September 4, 1900
Otis	Statutory town	Washington	511	475	+7.58%	0.413 sq mi 1.070 km^{2}	1237/sq mi 478/km^{2}	March 27, 1917
Ouray† (Note: Ouray has been the seat of Ouray County, Colorado since the county was created on January 18, 1877, although the name of the county was changed to Uncompahgre County for the three days from February 27 to March 2, 1883.)	Home rule city	Ouray	898	1,000	−10.20%	0.863 sq mi 2.234 km^{2}	1041/sq mi 402/km^{2}	March 24, 1884
Ovid	Statutory town	Sedgwick	271	318	−14.78%	0.156 sq mi 0.403 km^{2}	1742/sq mi 672/km^{2}	December 21, 1925
Pagosa Springs† (Note: Pagosa Springs has been the seat of Archuleta County, Colorado since the county was created on April 14, 1885.)	Home rule town	Archuleta	1,571	1,727	−9.03%	5.033 sq mi 13.036 km^{2}	312/sq mi 121/km^{2}	March 18, 1891
Palisade	Statutory town	Mesa	2,565	2,692	−4.72%	1.188 sq mi 3.078 km^{2}	2158/sq mi 833/km^{2}	April 4, 1904
Palmer Lake	Statutory town	El Paso	2,636	2,420	+8.93%	3.049 sq mi 7.896 km^{2}	865/sq mi 334/km^{2}	March 12, 1889
Paoli	Statutory town	Phillips	51	34	+50.00%	0.296 sq mi 0.766 km^{2}	172.4/sq mi 66.6/km^{2}	August 6, 1930
Paonia	Statutory town	Delta	1,447	1,451	−0.28%	0.821 sq mi 2.127 km^{2}	1762/sq mi 680/km^{2}	September 3, 1902
Parachute	Home rule town	Garfield	1,390	1,085	+28.11%	1.806 sq mi 4.679 km^{2}	769/sq mi 297/km^{2}	April 1, 1908 (Note: Parachute was originally incorporated on April 1, 1908 as the Town of Grand Valley.)
Parker	Home rule town	Douglas	58,512	45,297	+29.17%	22.335 sq mi 57.847 km^{2}	2620/sq mi 1,011/km^{2}	May 1981
Peetz	Statutory town	Logan	213	238	−10.50%	0.223 sq mi 0.578 km^{2}	954/sq mi 369/km^{2}	May 17, 1917
Pierce	Statutory town	Weld	1,097	834	+31.53%	1.858 sq mi 4.812 km^{2}	590/sq mi 228/km^{2}	August 30, 1918
Pitkin	Statutory town	Gunnison	72	66	+9.09%	0.258 sq mi 0.668 km^{2}	279/sq mi 108/km^{2}	April 5, 1880
Platteville	Statutory town	Weld	2,955	2,485	+18.91%	3.073 sq mi 7.960 km^{2}	961/sq mi 371/km^{2}	January 1, 1887
Poncha Springs	Statutory town	Chaffee	925	737	+25.51%	2.984 sq mi 7.729 km^{2}	310/sq mi 120/km^{2}	December 16, 1880
Pritchett	Statutory town	Baca	112	140	−20.00%	0.233 sq mi 0.604 km^{2}	480/sq mi 185/km^{2}	January 24, 1929
Pueblo† (Note: The City of Pueblo is the principal city of the Pueblo, CO Metropolitan Statistical Area and the Pueblo-Cañon City, CO Combined Statistical Area.) (Note: On November 28, 1859, the Provisional Government of the Territory of Jefferson created 12 counties, with Pueblo as the seat of Fountain County, Jefferson Territory. On November 1, 1861, the new Territory of Colorado created 17 original counties, with Pueblo as the seat of Pueblo County, Colorado Territory, and since statehood on August 1, 1876, the seat of Pueblo County, Colorado.)	Home rule city	Pueblo	111,876	106,595	+4.95%	55.382 sq mi 143.439 km^{2}	2020/sq mi 780/km^{2}	November 15, 1885
Ramah	Statutory town	El Paso	111	123	−9.76%	0.246 sq mi 0.637 km^{2}	451/sq mi 174/km^{2}	July 18, 1927
Rangely	Statutory town	Rio Blanco	2,299	2,365	−2.79%	4.304 sq mi 11.148 km^{2}	534/sq mi 206/km^{2}	August 27, 1946
Raymer (Note: Raymer is served by the New Raymer post office, creating some confusion about the town's name.)	Statutory town	Weld	110	96	+14.58%	0.784 sq mi 2.031 km^{2}	140.3/sq mi 54.2/km^{2}	1919
Red Cliff (Note: Red Cliff served as the original seat of Eagle County, Colorado since the county was created on February 11, 1883, until 1921. Red Cliff changed its name to Redcliff on February 7, 1895; then changed it back to Red Cliff on April 1, 1979.)	Statutory town	Eagle	257	267	−3.75%	0.244 sq mi 0.632 km^{2}	1053/sq mi 407/km^{2}	December 18, 1880
Rico (Note: Rico served as the original seat of Dolores County, Colorado since the county was created on March 4, 1881, until 1945.)	Home rule town	Dolores	288	265	+8.68%	0.678 sq mi 1.757 km^{2}	425/sq mi 164/km^{2}	February 25, 1880
Ridgway	Home rule town	Ouray	1,183	924	+28.03%	1.848 sq mi 4.787 km^{2}	640/sq mi 247/km^{2}	April 2, 1891
Rifle (Note: The City of Rifle is the principal city of the Rifle, CO Micropolitan Statistical Area.)	Home rule city	Garfield	10,437	9,172	+13.79%	7.034 sq mi 18.219 km^{2}	1484/sq mi 573/km^{2}	August 18, 1905
Rockvale	Statutory town	Fremont	511	487	+4.93%	2.040 sq mi 5.283 km^{2}	250.5/sq mi 96.7/km^{2}	September 30, 1886
Rocky Ford	Statutory city	Otero	3,876	3,957	−2.05%	1.679 sq mi 4.348 km^{2}	2309/sq mi 891/km^{2}	August 19, 1887
Romeo	Statutory town	Conejos	302	404	−25.25%	0.233 sq mi 0.604 km^{2}	1295/sq mi 500/km^{2}	September 4, 1923
Rye	Statutory town	Pueblo	206	153	+34.64%	0.094 sq mi 0.244 km^{2}	2187/sq mi 844/km^{2}	November 22, 1937
Saguache† (Note: On December 29, 1866, the Territory of Colorado created Saguache County, Colorado Territory with Saguache as the county seat, and since statehood on August 1, 1876, the seat of Saguache County, Colorado.) (Note: The name "Saguache" is pronounced /səˈwætʃ/. This name comes from the Ute language noun "sawup" /səˈwʌp/ meaning "sand dunes". The Spanish language version of this name is usually spelled "Saguache", while the English language version is usually spelled "Sawatch".)	Statutory town	Saguache	539	485	+11.13%	0.394 sq mi 1.021 km^{2}	1367/sq mi 528/km^{2}	August 13, 1891
Salida† (Note: On March 28, 1881, Arkansas changed its name to Salida. Salida has served as the seat of Chaffee County, Colorado since 1928.)	Statutory city	Chaffee	5,666	5,236	+8.21%	2.792 sq mi 7.230 km^{2}	2030/sq mi 784/km^{2}	March 23, 1891
San Luis† (Note: San Luis de la Culebra was settled on April 9, 1851. In 1863, county voters selected San Luis as the new seat of Costilla County, Colorado Territory, and since statehood on August 1, 1876, the seat of Costilla County, Colorado. San Luis is the oldest continuously occupied community in Colorado.)	Statutory town	Costilla	598	629	−4.93%	0.567 sq mi 1.468 km^{2}	1055/sq mi 407/km^{2}	1968
Sanford	Home rule town	Conejos	879	879	0.00%	1.460 sq mi 3.782 km^{2}	602/sq mi 232/km^{2}	April 9, 1907
Sawpit	Statutory town	San Miguel	38	40	−5.00%	0.030 sq mi 0.078 km^{2}	1262/sq mi 487/km^{2}	1896
Sedgwick	Statutory town	Sedgwick	172	146	+17.81%	0.389 sq mi 1.008 km^{2}	442/sq mi 171/km^{2}	January 28, 1918
Seibert	Statutory town	Kit Carson	172	181	−4.97%	0.343 sq mi 0.888 km^{2}	502/sq mi 194/km^{2}	June 21, 1917
Severance	Statutory town	Weld	7,683	3,165	+142.75%	9.098 sq mi 23.563 km^{2}	844/sq mi 326/km^{2}	November 20, 1920
Sheridan	Home rule city	Arapahoe	6,105	5,664	+7.79%	2.223 sq mi 5.758 km^{2}	2746/sq mi 1,060/km^{2}	April 1, 1890
Sheridan Lake (Note: On September 20, 1887, Bee changed its name to Sheridan Lake; then changed it back to Bee on October 15, 1887; then changed it back again to Sheridan Lake on October 27, 1887. Sheridan Lake served as the original seat of Kiowa County, Colorado since the county was created on April 11, 1889, until 1902.)	Statutory town	Kiowa	55	88	−37.50%	0.311 sq mi 0.804 km^{2}	177.2/sq mi 68.4/km^{2}	June 11, 1951
Silt	Home rule town	Garfield	3,536	2,930	+20.68%	1.655 sq mi 4.287 km^{2}	2136/sq mi 825/km^{2}	May 19, 1915
Silver Cliff (Note: Silver Cliff served as the seat of Custer County, Colorado from 1886 until 1928.)	Statutory town	Custer	609	587	+3.75%	15.458 sq mi 40.035 km^{2}	39.4/sq mi 15.2/km^{2}	February 10, 1879
Silver Plume	Home rule town	Clear Creek	207	170	+21.76%	0.259 sq mi 0.670 km^{2}	800/sq mi 309/km^{2}	September 24, 1880
Silverthorne	Home rule town	Summit	4,402	3,887	+13.25%	4.001 sq mi 10.363 km^{2}	1100/sq mi 425/km^{2}	September 5, 1967
Silverton† (Note: On January 31, 1876, the Territory of Colorado created San Juan County, Colorado Territory with Silverton as the county seat, and since statehood on August 1 of that year, the seat of San Juan County, Colorado.)	Statutory town	San Juan	622	637	−2.35%	0.835 sq mi 2.162 km^{2}	745/sq mi 288/km^{2}	November 15, 1885
Simla	Statutory town	Elbert	601	618	−2.75%	0.616 sq mi 1.596 km^{2}	975/sq mi 377/km^{2}	January 15, 1913
Snowmass Village	Home rule town	Pitkin	3,096	2,826	+9.55%	27.782 sq mi 71.955 km^{2}	111.4/sq mi 43.0/km^{2}	1977
South Fork	Statutory town	Rio Grande	510	386	+32.12%	2.498 sq mi 6.470 km^{2}	204.2/sq mi 78.8/km^{2}	May 19, 1992
Springfield† (Note: Springfield has been the seat of Baca County, Colorado since the county was created on April 16, 1889.)	Statutory town	Baca	1,325	1,451	−8.68%	1.126 sq mi 2.917 km^{2}	1176/sq mi 454/km^{2}	January 16, 1889
Starkville	Statutory town	Las Animas	62	59	+5.08%	0.073 sq mi 0.189 km^{2}	850/sq mi 328/km^{2}	March 2, 1954
Steamboat Springs† (Note: The City of Steamboat Springs is the principal city of the Steamboat Springs, CO Micropolitan Statistical Area and the Steamboat Springs-Craig, CO Combined Statistical Area.) (Note: Steamboat Springs has served as the seat of Routt County, Colorado since 1912.)	Home rule city	Routt	13,224	12,088	+9.40%	9.888 sq mi 25.609 km^{2}	1337/sq mi 516/km^{2}	July 19, 1900
Sterling† (Note: The City of Sterling is the principal city of the Sterling, CO Micropolitan Statistical Area.) (Note: Sterling has been the seat of Logan County, Colorado since the county was created on February 25, 1887.)	Home rule city	Logan	13,735	14,777	−7.05%	7.583 sq mi 19.641 km^{2}	1811/sq mi 699/km^{2}	December 3, 1884
Stratton	Statutory town	Kit Carson	656	658	−0.30%	0.514 sq mi 1.331 km^{2}	1277/sq mi 493/km^{2}	April 15, 1917
Sugar City	Statutory town	Crowley	259	258	+0.39%	0.385 sq mi 0.997 km^{2}	673/sq mi 260/km^{2}	July 2, 1900
Superior	Statutory town	Boulder, Jefferson	13,094	12,483	+4.89%	3.933 sq mi 10.186 km^{2}	3329/sq mi 1,285/km^{2}	June 10, 1904
Swink	Statutory town	Otero	604	617	−2.11%	0.280 sq mi 0.725 km^{2}	2158/sq mi 833/km^{2}	June 6, 1906
Telluride† (Note: On July 26, 1880, Columbia changed its name to Telluride. Telluride has been the seat of San Miguel County, Colorado since the county was created on March 2, 1883.)	Home rule town	San Miguel	2,607	2,325	+12.13%	2.222 sq mi 5.755 km^{2}	1173/sq mi 453/km^{2}	February 10, 1887 (Note: Telluride was originally incorporated on February 10, 1887 as the Town of Columbia.)
Thornton	Home rule city	Adams, Weld	141,867	118,772	+19.44%	35.924 sq mi 93.043 km^{2}	3949/sq mi 1,525/km^{2}	June 12, 1956
Timnath	Home rule town	Larimer	6,487	625	+937.92%	6.565 sq mi 17.004 km^{2}	988/sq mi 381/km^{2}	July 6, 1920
Trinidad† (Note: On February 9, 1866, the Territory of Colorado created Las Animas County, Colorado Territory with Trinidad as its seat until statehood on August 1, 1876, when it became the seat of Las Animas County, Colorado.)	Home rule city	Las Animas	8,329	9,096	−8.43%	9.385 sq mi 24.306 km^{2}	888/sq mi 343/km^{2}	December 30, 1879
Two Buttes	Statutory town	Baca	34	43	−20.93%	0.248 sq mi 0.642 km^{2}	137.2/sq mi 53.0/km^{2}	October 19, 1911
Vail	Home rule town	Eagle	4,835	5,305	−8.86%	4.706 sq mi 12.188 km^{2}	1027/sq mi 397/km^{2}	1966
Victor	Statutory city	Teller	379	397	−4.53%	0.287 sq mi 0.744 km^{2}	1319/sq mi 509/km^{2}	July 16, 1894
Vilas	Statutory town	Baca	98	114	−14.04%	0.128 sq mi 0.331 km^{2}	767/sq mi 296/km^{2}	June 25, 1888
Vona	Statutory town	Kit Carson	95	106	−10.38%	0.221 sq mi 0.573 km^{2}	429/sq mi 166/km^{2}	August 9, 1919
Walden† (Note: Walden has been the seat of Jackson County, Colorado since the county was created on May 5, 1909.)	Statutory town	Jackson	606	608	−0.33%	0.335 sq mi 0.868 km^{2}	1808/sq mi 698/km^{2}	December 2, 1890
Walsenburg† (Note: In 1874, county voters selected Walsenburgh as the new seat of Huerfano County, Colorado Territory, and since statehood on August 1, 1876, the seat of Huerfano County, Colorado. On October 20, 1887, Walsenburgh changed its name to Tourist; then changed it back Walsenburgh on November 29, 1887; then shortened it to Walsenburg on December 22, 1892.)	Statutory city	Huerfano	3,049	3,068	−0.62%	2.990 sq mi 7.743 km^{2}	1020/sq mi 394/km^{2}	June 16, 1873
Walsh	Statutory town	Baca	543	546	−0.55%	0.447 sq mi 1.158 km^{2}	1214/sq mi 469/km^{2}	July 19, 1928
Ward	Home rule town	Boulder	128	150	−14.67%	0.536 sq mi 1.387 km^{2}	239/sq mi 92.3/km^{2}	June 9, 1896
Wellington	Statutory town	Larimer	11,047	6,289	+75.66%	3.630 sq mi 9.401 km^{2}	3043/sq mi 1,175/km^{2}	November 10, 1905
Westcliffe† (Note: Westcliffe has served as the seat of Custer County, Colorado since 1928.)	Statutory town	Custer	435	568	−23.42%	1.235 sq mi 3.198 km^{2}	352/sq mi 136/km^{2}	November 21, 1887
Westminster	Home rule city	Adams, Jefferson	116,317	106,114	+9.62%	31.585 sq mi 81.806 km^{2}	3683/sq mi 1,422/km^{2}	May 24, 1911
Wheat Ridge	Home rule city	Jefferson	32,398	30,166	+7.40%	9.344 sq mi 24.200 km^{2}	3467/sq mi 1,339/km^{2}	August 20, 1969
Wiggins	Statutory town	Morgan	1,401	893	+56.89%	1.323 sq mi 3.426 km^{2}	1059/sq mi 409/km^{2}	October 11, 1974
Wiley	Statutory town	Prowers	437	405	+7.90%	0.311 sq mi 0.806 km^{2}	1404/sq mi 542/km^{2}	January 28, 1909
Williamsburg	Statutory town	Fremont	731	662	+10.42%	3.532 sq mi 9.148 km^{2}	207/sq mi 79.9/km^{2}	April 7, 1888
Windsor	Home rule town	Weld, Larimer	32,716	18,644	+75.48%	25.629 sq mi 66.379 km^{2}	1277/sq mi 493/km^{2}	April 15, 1890
Winter Park	Home rule town	Grand	1,033	999	+3.40%	16.889 sq mi 43.743 km^{2}	61.2/sq mi 23.6/km^{2}	September 1, 1979
Woodland Park	Home rule city	Teller	7,920	7,200	+10.00%	6.611 sq mi 17.123 km^{2}	1198/sq mi 463/km^{2}	June 6, 1891
Wray† (Note: Wray has served as the seat of Yuma County, Colorado since 1902.)	Home rule city	Yuma	2,358	2,342	+0.68%	3.479 sq mi 9.010 km^{2}	678/sq mi 262/km^{2}	June 22, 1906
Yampa	Statutory town	Routt	399	429	−6.99%	0.240 sq mi 0.622 km^{2}	1661/sq mi 641/km^{2}	February 25, 1907
Yuma (Note: Yuma served as the original seat of Yuma County, Colorado from the creation of the county on March 15, 1889, until 1902.)	Home rule city	Yuma	3,456	3,524	−1.93%	3.172 sq mi 8.214 km^{2}	1090/sq mi 421/km^{2}	March 24, 1887
Active Colorado municipalities			4,299,942	3,671,234	+17.13%	1,968 sq mi 5097 km^{2}	2,185/sq mi 844/km^{2}	

=== Active municipalities in multiple counties ===
Twenty-one active Colorado municipalities currently extend into more than one county.

Colorado municipalities in multiple counties
Municipality	Counties	2020 Census population		
Municipality	Counties	Total	by county	%
Arvada	Jefferson	124,402	121,510	98%
Arvada	Adams	124,402	2,892	2%
Aurora	Arapahoe	386,261	336,035	87%
Aurora	Adams	386,261	47,720	12%
Aurora	Douglas	386,261	2,506	1%
Basalt	Eagle	3,984	2,917	73%
Basalt	Pitkin	3,984	1,067	27%
Bennett	Adams	2,862	2,443	85%
Bennett	Arapahoe	2,862	419	15%
Berthoud	Larimer	10,332	10,071	97%
Berthoud	Weld	10,332	261	3%
Bow Mar	Arapahoe	853	587	69%
Bow Mar	Jefferson	853	266	31%
Brighton†	Adams	40,083	39,718	99%
Brighton†	Weld	40,083	365	1%
Center	Saguache	1,929	1,885	98%
Center	Rio Grande	1,929	44	2%
Central City†	Gilpin	779	779	100%
Central City†	Clear Creek	779	0	0%
Erie	Weld	30,038	17,387	58%
Erie	Boulder	30,038	12,651	42%
Green Mountain Falls	El Paso	646	622	96%
Green Mountain Falls	Teller	646	24	4%
Johnstown	Weld	17,303	12,547	73%
Johnstown	Larimer	17,303	4,756	27%
Littleton†	Arapahoe	45,652	42,702	94%
Littleton†	Jefferson	45,652	2,310	5%
Littleton†	Douglas	45,652	640	1%
Lochbuie	Weld	8,088	8,087	99.99%
Lochbuie	Adams	8,088	1	0.01%
Longmont	Boulder	98,885	97,587	99%
Longmont	Weld	98,885	1,298	1%
Northglenn	Adams	38,131	38,106	99.93%
Northglenn	Weld	38,131	25	0.07%
Superior	Boulder	13,094	13,094	100%
Superior	Jefferson	13,094	0	0%
Thornton	Adams	141,867	141,867	100%
Thornton	Weld	141,867	0	0%
Timnath	Larimer	6,487	6,482	99.92%
Timnath	Weld	6,487	5	0.08%
Westminster	Adams	116,317	71,240	61%
Westminster	Jefferson	116,317	45,077	39%
Windsor	Weld	32,716	24,997	76%
Windsor	Larimer	32,716	7,719	24%

== Former municipalities ==
The following sortable table is an incomplete list of municipalities formerly incorporated in the State of Colorado.

Formerly incorporated municipalities of Colorado
Municipality	Type of government	County	Date incorporated	Date deactivated (Note: Many of the municipalities declared abandoned in the 21st century had actually been defunct for many years.)
Acequia (Note: On November 14, 2007, the Colorado Department of State declared the Douglas County towns of Acequia, Deckers, Douglas, Frankstown, Greenland, Huntsville, Lehigh, Louviers, Russelville, and West Creek abandoned.)	Statutory town	Douglas	1885	November 14, 2007
Argo (Note: On December 1, 1902, the new City and County of Denver annexed the enclosed towns of Argo, Berkeley, Elyria, Globeville, Montclair, and Valverde.)	Statutory town	Denver	1880	December 1, 1902
Barnum (Note: The City of Denver annexed the Town of Barnum on September 3, 1896.)	Statutory town	Denver	1887	September 3, 1896
Berkeley (Note: The Town of North Denver was incorporated in June 1892, and was renamed the Town of Berkeley in 1898.) (Note: The area of southwestern Adams County north of the former Town of Berkeley is known today as Berkley, Colorado.)	Statutory town	Denver	June 1892	December 1, 1902
Boston (Note: In 2005, the Colorado Secretary of State declared the Summit County towns of Boston, Braddoks, Carbonateville, Clinton City, Conger’s Camp, Cow Camp, Curtin, Decatur, Delaware Flats, Dickey, Dyersville, Excelsior, Farnham, Keystone, Kokomo, Lakeside, Lincoln, Masontown, Naomi, Parkville, Recen, Rexford, Robinson, Saints John, Swan City, Swandyke, Tiger, Uneva Lake, Valdoro, Wapiti, and Wheeler abandoned.)	Statutory town	Summit	NA	2005
Braddoks (Note: The Town of Braddoks was also spelled Braddock. The site was previously known as Delaware City.)	Statutory town	Summit	NA	2005
Carbonateville	Statutory town	Summit	NA	2005
Chihuahua (Note: On August 22, 2013, the Colorado Department of State declared the Town of Chihuahua, Colorado, abandoned.)	Statutory town	Summit	NA	August 22, 2013
Clinton City	Statutory town	Summit	NA	2005
Colfax (Note: The City of Denver annexed the Town of Colfax on June 23, 1897.)	Statutory town	Denver	1891	June 23, 1897
Colorado City (Note: The City of Colorado Springs annexed Colorado City on June 10, 1917.)	Statutory city	El Paso	1887	June 10, 1917
Conger's Camp	Statutory town	Summit	NA	2005
Cow Camp	Statutory town	Summit	NA	2005
Town of Creede	Statutory town	Mineral	March 19, 1892	July 23, 2026
Critchell (Note: In 2005, the Colorado Secretary of State declared the Town of Critchell abandoned.)	Statutory town	Jefferson	NA	2005
Crystal City	Statutory town	Gunnison	August 26, 1881	NA
Curtin	Statutory town	Summit	NA	2005
Decatur	Statutory town	Summit	NA	2005
Deckers	Statutory town	Douglas	1885	November 14, 2007
Delaware Flats	Statutory town	Summit	NA	2005
Dickey	Statutory town	Summit	NA	2005
Douglas	Statutory town	Douglas	1885	November 14, 2007
Dyersville	Statutory town	Summit	NA	2005
Elyria	Statutory town	Denver	August 2, 1890	December 1, 1902
Excelsior	Statutory town	Summit	NA	2005
Farnham	Statutory town	Summit	NA	2005
Frankstown (Note: Frankstown, Colorado, is now known as Franktown.)	Statutory town	Douglas	1885	November 14, 2007
Globeville	Statutory town	Denver	1891	December 1, 1902
Greenland	Statutory town	Douglas	1885	November 14, 2007
Harman (Note: The City of Denver annexed the Town of Harman on February 20, 1895.)	Statutory town	Denver	1886	February 20, 1895
Hartman (Note: On July 28, 2026, the Colorado Secretary of State declared that the Town of Hartman had been abandoned pursuant to 31-3-201 C.R.S.)	Statutory town	Prowers	May 14, 1910	July 28, 2026
Highlands (Note: The City of Denver annexed the Town of Highlands on July 24, 1896.)	Statutory town	Denver	April 8, 1875	July 24, 1896
Huntsville (Note: The long extinct Town of Huntsville was replaced by the new Town of Larkspur on October 16, 1979.)	Statutory town	Douglas	NA	November 14, 2007
Keota	Statutory town	Weld	April 17, 1919	February 19, 1991
Keystone (Note: On February 8, 2024, a new Town of Keystone was incorporated.)	Statutory town	Summit	NA	2005
Kokomo (Note: In 1881, most of the Town of Kokomo was destroyed by fire.)	Statutory town	Summit	NA	2005
Lakeside	Statutory town	Summit	NA	2005
Lehigh	Statutory town	Douglas	NA	November 14, 2007
Lincoln	Statutory town	Summit	NA	2005
Louviers	Statutory town	Douglas	1906	November 14, 2007
Masontown	Statutory town	Summit	NA	2005
Montclair	Statutory town	Denver	1888	December 1, 1902
Naomi	Statutory town	Summit	NA	2005
Parkville	Statutory town	Summit	NA	2005
Prospect Heights	Statutory town	Fremont	May 31, 1905	June 24, 1994
Recen	Statutory town	Summit	NA	2005
Rexford	Statutory town	Summit	NA	2005
Robinson	Statutory town	Summit	November 26, 1880	2005
Rosedale	Statutory town	Weld	1939	February 4, 1987
Russelville	Statutory town	Douglas	NA	November 14, 2007
Saints John (Note: The site of Saints John, Colorado was previously known as Coleyville.)	Statutory town	Summit	NA	2005
South Denver (Note: The City of Denver annexed the Town of South Denver on February 7, 1894.)	Statutory town	Denver	August 9, 1886	February 7, 1894
Swan City	Statutory town	Summit	NA	2005
Swandyke	Statutory town	Summit	NA	2005
Tiger	Statutory town	Summit	NA	2005
Uneva Lake	Statutory town	Summit	NA	2005
Valdoro	Statutory town	Summit	NA	2005
Valverde	Statutory town	Denver	1899	December 1, 1902
Wapiti	Statutory town	Summit	NA	2005
Watkins	Home rule town	Adams	June 30, 2004	November 30, 2006
West Creek (Note: West Creek, Colorado, is also spelled Westcreek)	Statutory town	Douglas	NA	November 14, 2007
Wheeler	Statutory town	Summit	NA	2005

== See also ==
- Bibliography of Colorado
- Geography of Colorado
- History of Colorado
- Index of Colorado-related articles
- List of census-designated places in Colorado
- List of Colorado-related lists
- List of counties in Colorado
- List of populated places in Colorado
- Outline of Colorado
