= Copper Mountain, Colorado =

Unincorporated community in Colorado, US

- Census-designated place
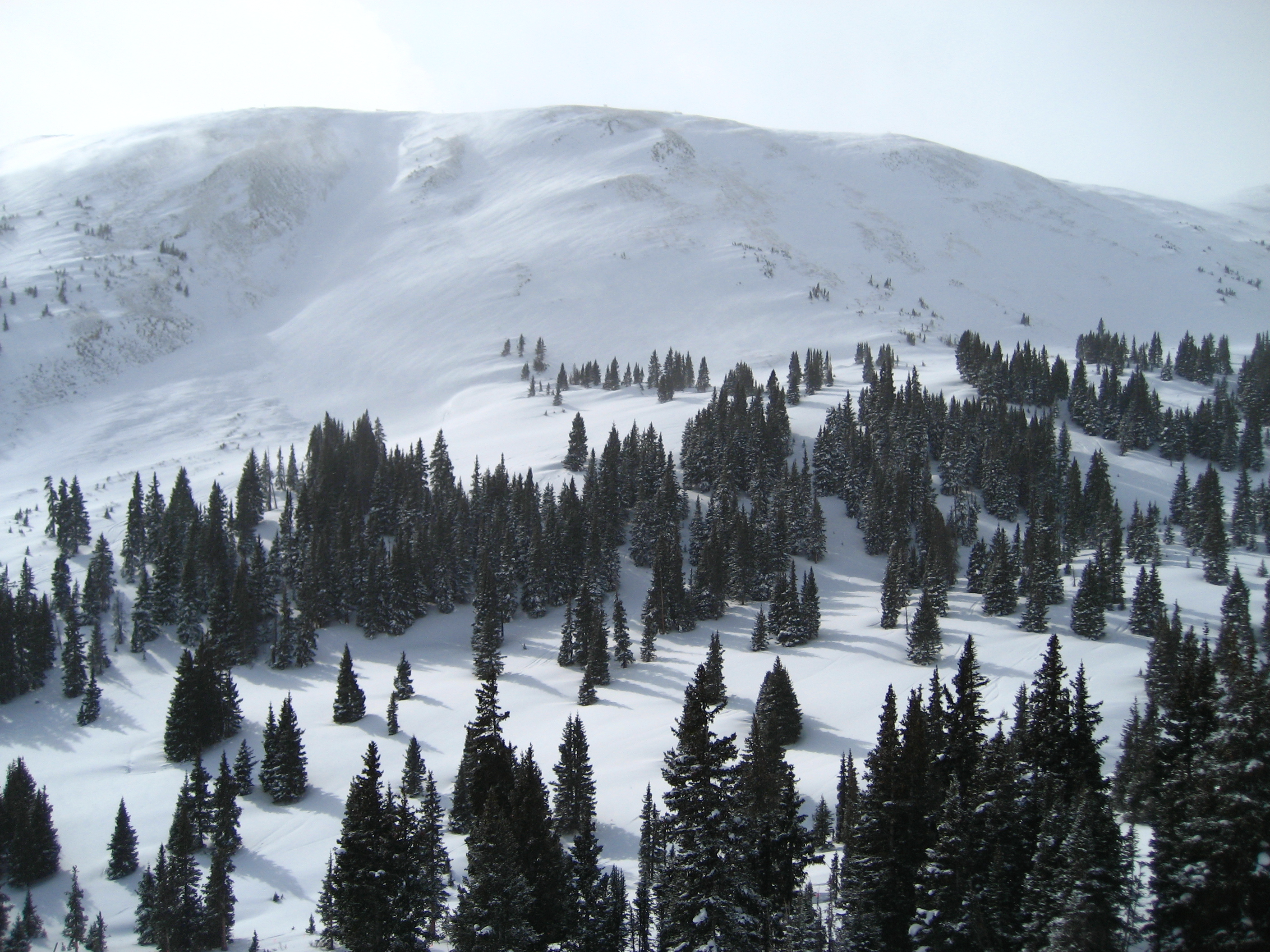
- Tucker Mountain at Copper Mountain Resort

- Location of the Copper Mountain CDP in Summit County, Colorado
- Coordinates: 39°29′50″N 106°13′23″W
- Country: United States
- State: Colorado
- County: Summit

Government
  - Type: unincorporated community
  - Body: Summit County

Area
  - Total: 32.058 sq mi (83.030 km^{2})
  - Land: 32.058 sq mi (83.030 km^{2})
  - Water: 0 sq mi (0.000 km^{2})
- Elevation: 11,362 ft (3,463 m)

Population (2020)
  - Total: 650
  - Density: 20/sq mi (7.8/km^{2})
- Time zone: UTC−07:00 (MST)
  - Summer (DST): UTC−06:00 (MDT)
- ZIP code: (Frisco) 80443
- Area codes: 970/748
- GNIS CDP ID: 2583226
- FIPS code: 08-17150
- Website: https://www.coppercolorado.com/

Copper Mountain is an unincorporated community and a census-designated place (CDP) located in and governed by Summit County, Colorado, United States. The CDP is a part of the Breckenridge, CO Micropolitan Statistical Area. The population of the Copper Mountain CDP was 650 at the United States Census 2020. The Copper Mountain Consolidated Metropolitan District provides services. The Frisco post office (Zip Code 80443) serves the area. The Copper Mountain CDP includes the Copper Mountain Ski Resort and Copper Mountain village.

== History ==
Copper Mountain was originally named "Wheeler" for a local judge and developer. The Wheeler, Colorado, post office operated from April 1, 1880, until May 14, 1894. The Town of Wheeler incorporated as a statutory town, but was declared abandoned in 2005. (Note: In 2005, the Colorado Secretary of State declared the Summit County towns of Boston, Braddoks, Carbonateville, Clinton City, Conger’s Camp, Cow Camp, Curtin, Decatur, Delaware Flats, Dickey, Dyersville, Excelsior, Farnham, Keystone, Kokomo, Lakeside, Lincoln, Masontown, Naomi, Parkville, Recen, Rexford, Robinson, Saints John, Swan City, Swandyke, Tiger, Uneva Lake, Valdoro, Wapiti, and Wheeler abandoned.)

The Copper Mountain Ski Resort opened in 1972, and wished to change the former town's name. The naming question was settled by a decision from the Board on Geographic Names, which ruled in favor of "Copper Mountain" in 1977. The Copper Mountain, Colorado, post office opened on September 8, 1977, but the Frisco, Colorado, post office (ZIP code 80443) now serves the area.

== Geography ==
Copper Mountain is located approximately 20 miles (32 km) north-northeast of Leadville in the White River National Forest.

At the 2020 United States Census, the Copper Mountain CDP had an area of 20,517 acres (83.030 km^{2}), all land.

== Demographics ==
The United States Census Bureau initially defined the Copper Mountain CDP for the United States Census 2010.

Copper Mountain CDP, Colorado
Year	Pop.	±%
2010	385	—
2020	650	+68.8%
Source: United States Census Bureau

== See also ==
- Breckenridge, CO Micropolitan Statistical Area
- Copper Mountain Ski Resort
