= Jones Gulch =

Coordinates: 39°36′16.45″N 105°55′47.57″W

Jones Gulch is a valley in Summit County, Colorado. The nearest major town is Dillon, Colorado.

Jones Gulch is a valley located between Independence and Dercum Mountain, directly south east from the resort town of Keystone, Colorado. At the bottom of the valley lies an abandoned mining settlement consisting of a few (still standing) homes and some mining equipment. The settlement can be accessed by trails that approach from the north side of Dercum Mountain. To the east, the western face of Independence mountain trailed by a mining road connecting the settlement with old mine shafts.
