= Hartman, Colorado =

Unincorporated community in Prowers County, Colorado, United States

- Unincorporated community
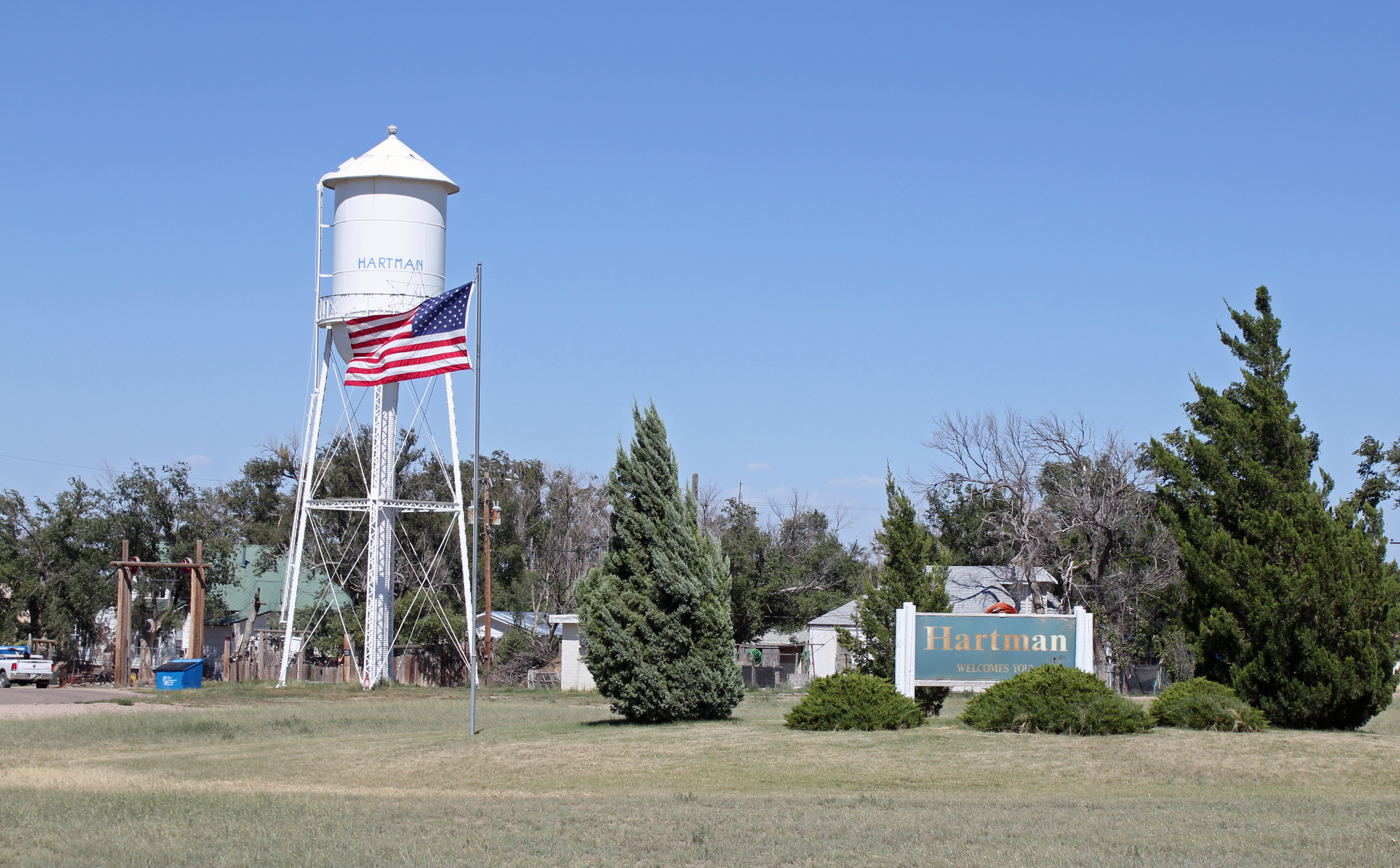
- Welcome sign and water tower (2013)

- Location with Prowers County and Colorado
- Coordinates: 38°7′14″N 102°13′9″W
- Country: United States
- State: Colorado
- County: Prowers
- Incorporated: May 14, 1910
- Abandoned: July 28, 2026

Area
  - Total: 0.275 sq mi (0.711 km^{2})
  - Land: 0.275 sq mi (0.711 km^{2})
  - Water: 0 sq mi (0 km^{2})
- Elevation: 3,586 ft (1,093 m)

Population (2020)
  - Total: 56
  - Density: 200/sq mi (79/km^{2})
- Time zone: UTC-7 (MST)
  - Summer (DST): UTC-6 (MDT)
- ZIP Code: 81043 (PO Box)
- Area code: 719
- FIPS code: 08-34520
- GNIS ID: 2412730

Hartman is an unincorporated community and former statutory town in Prowers County, Colorado, United States. The town population was 56 at the 2020 United States census. In 2026 the town was officially declared abandoned, at the request of the remaining residents. The town is located north of SH-196.

== History ==
A post office called Hartman has been in operation since 1908. The community was named after W. P. Hartman, a railroad official.

The town has one historic site, the old Hartman Gymnasium. The circa 1938 gymnasium is associated with New Deal programs in Prowers County. The building is the only example of Works Progress Administration (WPA) construction in Hartman and one of only a few such projects in the county. Its use as a community center continues to contribute to the social history of Hartman. As of 2026, the town has a post office and no businesses.

Due to conflicts and physical altercations between the town's residents, all of the existing town trustees resigned in January 2026, with the mayor pro tempore charged with disorderly conduct, resulting in subsequent closure of the town's bank account and post office box. Town records were turned over to Prowers County officials, who reached out to state officials for assistance with town administration. Although Prowers County manages maintenance of roads and law enforcement, Hartman maintains its own water supply. Due to deteriorating maintenance and quality testing issues, the water supply has been under a boil advisory since September 2025, and the collapse of the local government in 2026 has threatened the provision of water due to inability to purify the water. On July 28, 2026, the Colorado Secretary of State declared that the Town of Hartman had been abandoned pursuant to 31-3-201 C.R.S., effectively giving Prowers County control of all remaining functions and local services.

== Geography ==
At the 2020 United States census, the town had a total area of 176 acres (0.711 km^{2}), all of it land.

== Demographics ==
Historical population
Census	Pop.	Note	%±
1920	175		—
1930	269		53.7%
1940	148		−45.0%
1950	181		22.3%
1960	164		−9.4%
1970	129		−21.3%
1980	122		−5.4%
1990	108		−11.5%
2000	111		2.8%
2010	81		−27.0%
2020	56		−30.9%
U.S. Decennial Census

As of the census of 2000, there were 111 people, 40 households, and 31 families residing in the town. The population density was 365.6 inhabitants per square mile (141.2/km^{2}). There were 50 housing units at an average density of 164.7 per square mile (63.6/km^{2}). The racial makeup of the town was 86.49% White, 0.90% Native American, 7.21% from other races, and 5.41% from two or more races. Hispanic or Latino of any race were 36.94% of the population.

There were 40 households, out of which 42.5% had children under the age of 18 living with them, 57.5% were married couples living together, 12.5% had a female householder with no husband present, and 22.5% were non-families. 22.5% of all households were made up of individuals, and 15.0% had someone living alone who was 65 years of age or older. The average household size was 2.78 and the average family size was 3.23.

In the town, the population was spread out, with 34.2% under the age of 18, 9.9% from 18 to 24, 27.0% from 25 to 44, 15.3% from 45 to 64, and 13.5% who were 65 years of age or older. The median age was 33 years. For every 100 females, there were 105.6 males. For every 100 females age 18 and over, there were 92.1 males.

The median income for a household in the town was $23,750, and the median income for a family was $24,375. Males had a median income of $16,250 versus $25,417 for females. The per capita income for the town was $11,816. About 32.4% of families and 42.7% of the population were below the poverty line, including 60.5% of those under the age of 18 and 5.9% of those 65 and older.
