= Greenland, Colorado =

Unincorporated community in Douglas County, CO, USA

- Unincorporated community
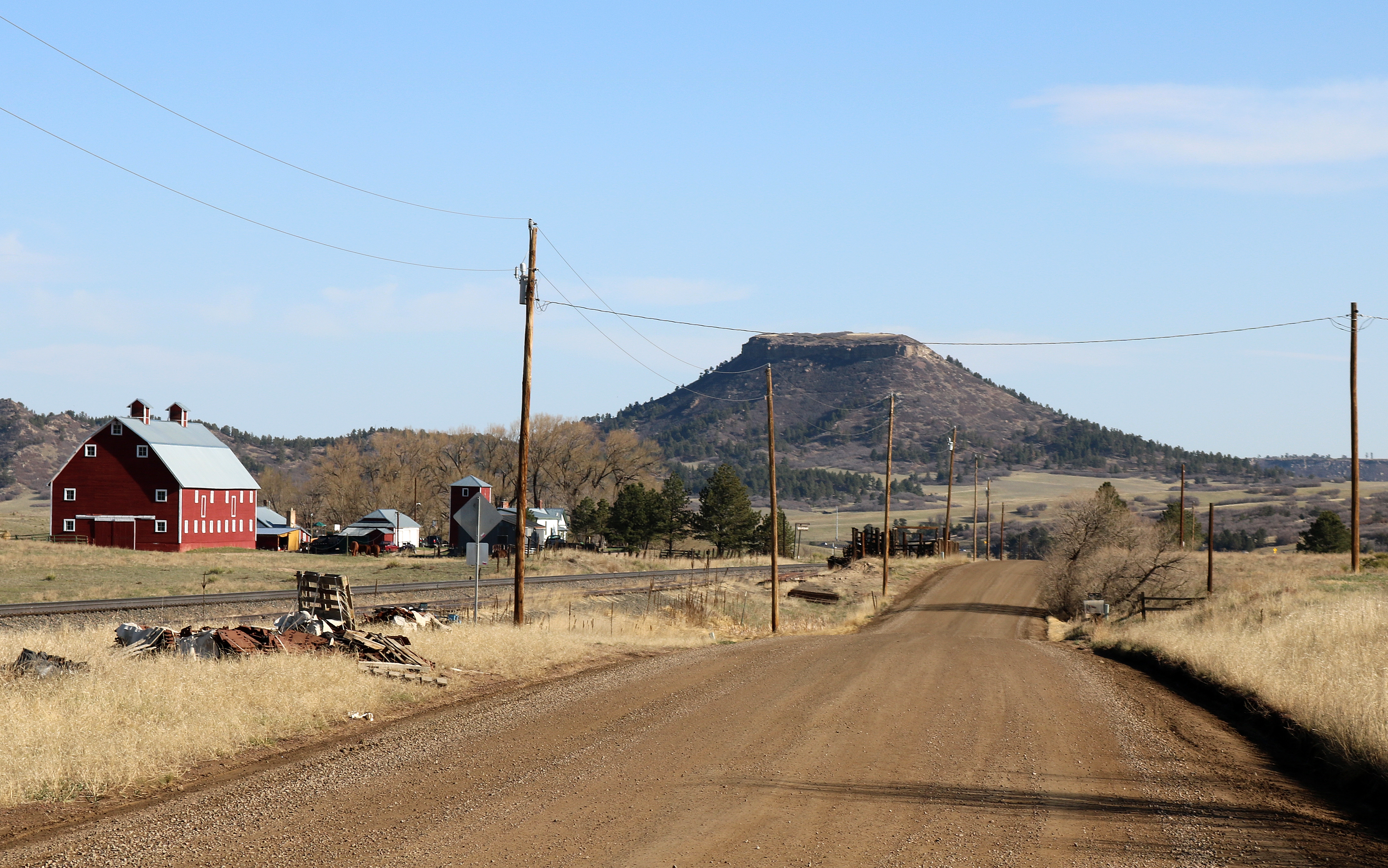
- East Noe Road in Greenland, with Larkspur Butte in the distance.

- Location in Douglas County and the state of Colorado
- Coordinates: 39°10′57″N 104°51′19″W
- Country: United States
- State: Colorado
- County: Douglas County

Government
  - Type: Unincorporated Community

Area
  - Total: 1.4 sq mi (3.5 km^{2})
  - Land: 1.4 sq mi (3.5 km^{2})
  - Water: 0 sq mi (0 km^{2})
- Elevation: 6,907 ft (2,105 m)
- Time zone: UTC-7 (MST)
  - Summer (DST): UTC-6 (MDT)
- ZIP code: 80118 (Larkspur)
- Area code: 303
- FIPS code: 08-43550
- GNIS feature ID: 193187

Greenland is an unincorporated community in Douglas County, Colorado, United States. Greenland is located off Exit 167 on Interstate 25. The largest nearby incorporated towns are Larkspur and Monument: Larkspur lies about 7 miles northeast and Monument about 13 miles south of the community. The U.S. Post Office at Larkspur (ZIP Code 80118) now serves the Greenland postal addresses.

A post office called Greenland was established in 1873, and remained in operation until 1959. The community was named for the green character of the original town site.

== Activities ==
A series of trail races of varying distances are held in Greenland each May. Douglas County Division of Open Space and Natural Resources manages Spruce Meadows Open Space and Trail, which is located on the southern edge of Greenland. Spruce Meadows Trail is a largely flat 8.6 mile-long path near Spruce Mountain that affords a view of Pikes Peak.

== Transportation ==
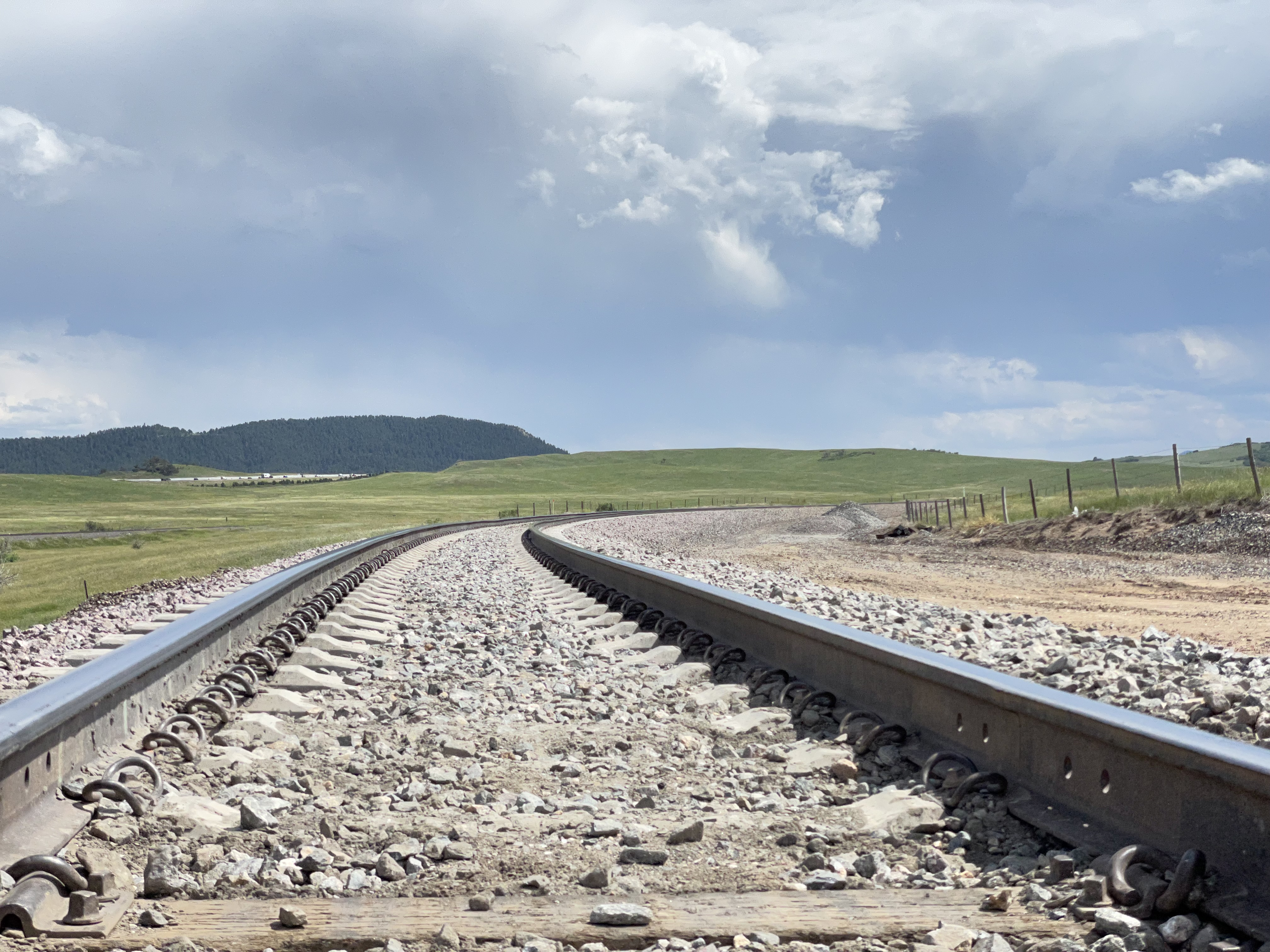
Colorado Joint Line tracks in Greenland, Colorado, in July 2021

=== Roads ===
Greenland is Directly served by I-25, US-85 and US-87 via. exit 167 at Noe Rd. But it is also served by SH-105.

=== Rail ===
The Colorado Joint Line (owned by Union Pacific and BNSF) operates through Greenland. There are no passenger trains that operate in and out of Greenland, though.

== See also ==
- Colorado municipalities
- Front Range Urban Corridor
