= Bonanza, Colorado =

Statutory town in Saguache County, Colorado, United States

Bonanza, Colorado Bonanza City
- Statutory town
- Town of Bonanza
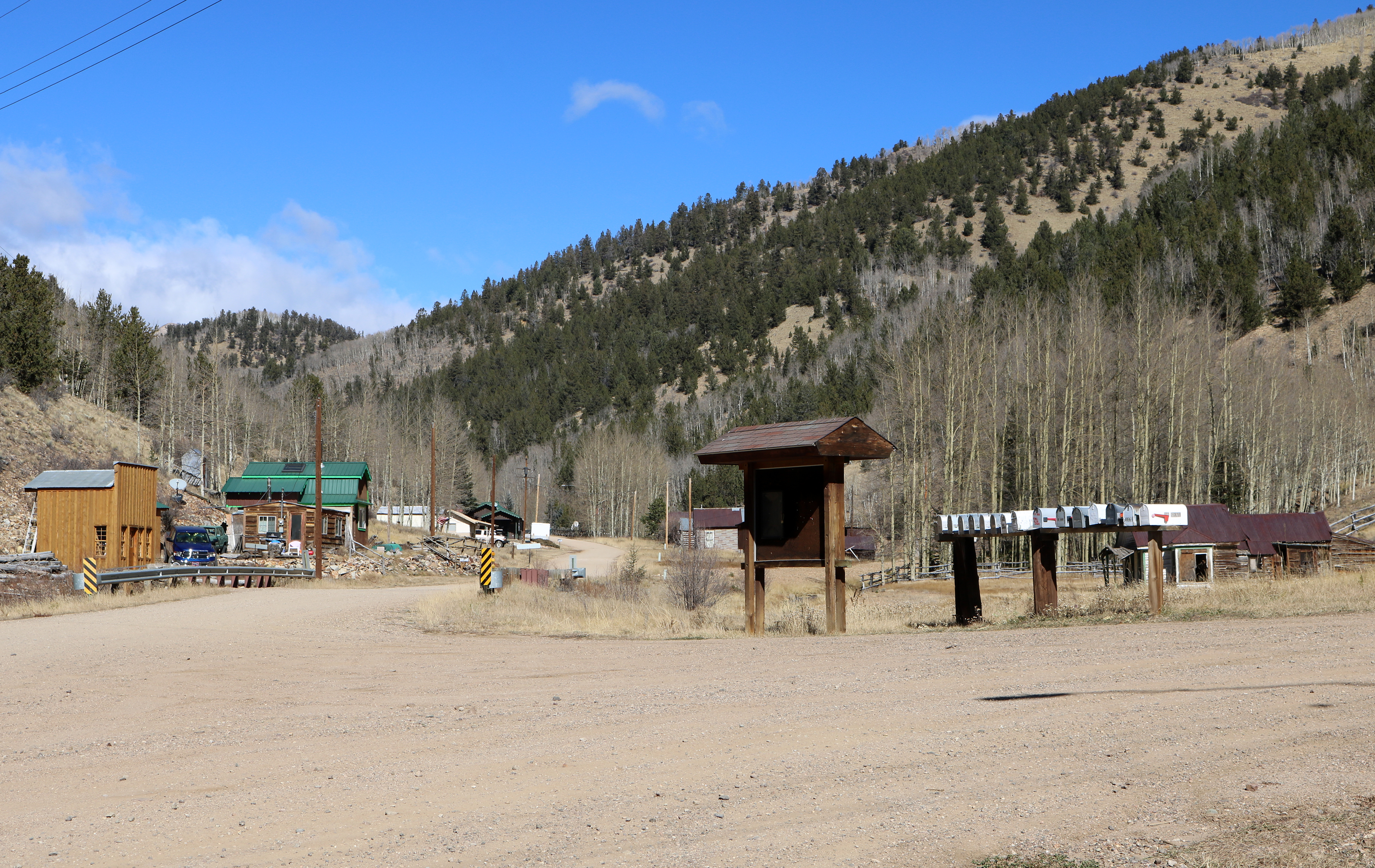
- Main Street and 1st Avenue in Bonanza.

- Location of the Town of Bonanza in Saguache County, Colorado
- Coordinates: 38°17′48″N 106°08′31″W
- Country: United States
- State: Colorado
- County: Saguache
- Incorporated: 1881-01-13, as the Town of Bonanza City

Government
  - Type: statutory town

Area
  - Total: 0.437 sq mi (1.133 km^{2})
  - Land: 0.437 sq mi (1.133 km^{2})
  - Water: 0 sq mi (0.000 km^{2})
- Elevation: 9,479 ft (2,889 m)

Population (2020)
  - Total: 17
- Time zone: UTC−07:00 (MST)
  - Summer (DST): UTC−06:00 (MDT)
- ZIP Code: Villa Grove CO 81155
- GNIS town ID: 2411706
- FIPS code: 07571

Bonanza is a statutory town located in Saguache County, Colorado, United States. The town population was 17 at the 2020 United States census. Formerly known as Bonanza City, Bonanza is a largely abandoned former silver mining town.

== History ==
In 1880, Tom Cooke of Salida stumbled upon ore deposits while searching for horses. Prospectors flocked to this location and the town of Bonanza City was founded. The Bonanza, Colorado, post office opened on August 12, 1880, and the Town of Bonanza City was incorporated on January 13, 1881. In the first two years of its existence, its population ballooned to between 1,000 and 1,500. At the time, population of mining towns was determined by the number of saloons and dance halls instead of a census taker and at this time, Bonanza City had 36 saloons and 7 dance halls. The Bonanza post office closed on May 14, 1938. The town shortened its name to the Town of Bonanza.

Token coin with the value of $1.00, issued by the Rawley Mine Commissary in Bonanza

== Geography ==
At the 2020 United States census, the town had a total area of 280 acres (1.133 km^{2}), all of it land.

== Demographics ==
Historical population
Census	Pop.	Note	%±
1890	96		—
1900	141		46.9%
1910	96		−31.9%
1920	91		−5.2%
1930	445		389.0%
1940	140		−68.5%
1950	51		−63.6%
1960	19		−62.7%
1970	10		−47.4%
1980	8		−20.0%
1990	16		100.0%
2000	14		−12.5%
2010	16		14.3%
2020	17		6.3%
U.S. Decennial Census

As of the census of 2000, there were 14 people, 7 households, and 3 families residing in the town. The population density was 31.9 inhabitants per square mile (12.3/km^{2}). There were 33 housing units at an average density of 75.3 per square mile (29.1/km^{2}). The racial makeup of the town was 71.43% White, 7.14% Asian, and 21.43% from two or more races.

There were 7 households, out of which 14.3% had children under the age of 18 living with them, 42.9% were married couples living together, and 57.1% were non-families. 42.9% of all households were made up of individuals, and none had someone living alone who was 65 years of age or older. The average household size was 2.00 and the average family size was 3.00.

In the town, the population was spread out, with 7.1% under the age of 18, 28.6% from 18 to 24, 14.3% from 25 to 44, 50.0% from 45 to 64, . The median age was 44 years. For every 100 females, there were 180.0 males. For every 100 females age 18 and over, there were 160.0 males.

The median income for a household in the town was $63,750, and the median income for a family was $27,000. The per capita income for the town was $66,857. None of the population and none of the families were below the poverty line.

== See also ==
- List of municipalities in Colorado
