= Westcreek, Colorado =

Unincorporated community in Douglas County, CO, USA

- Census-designated place
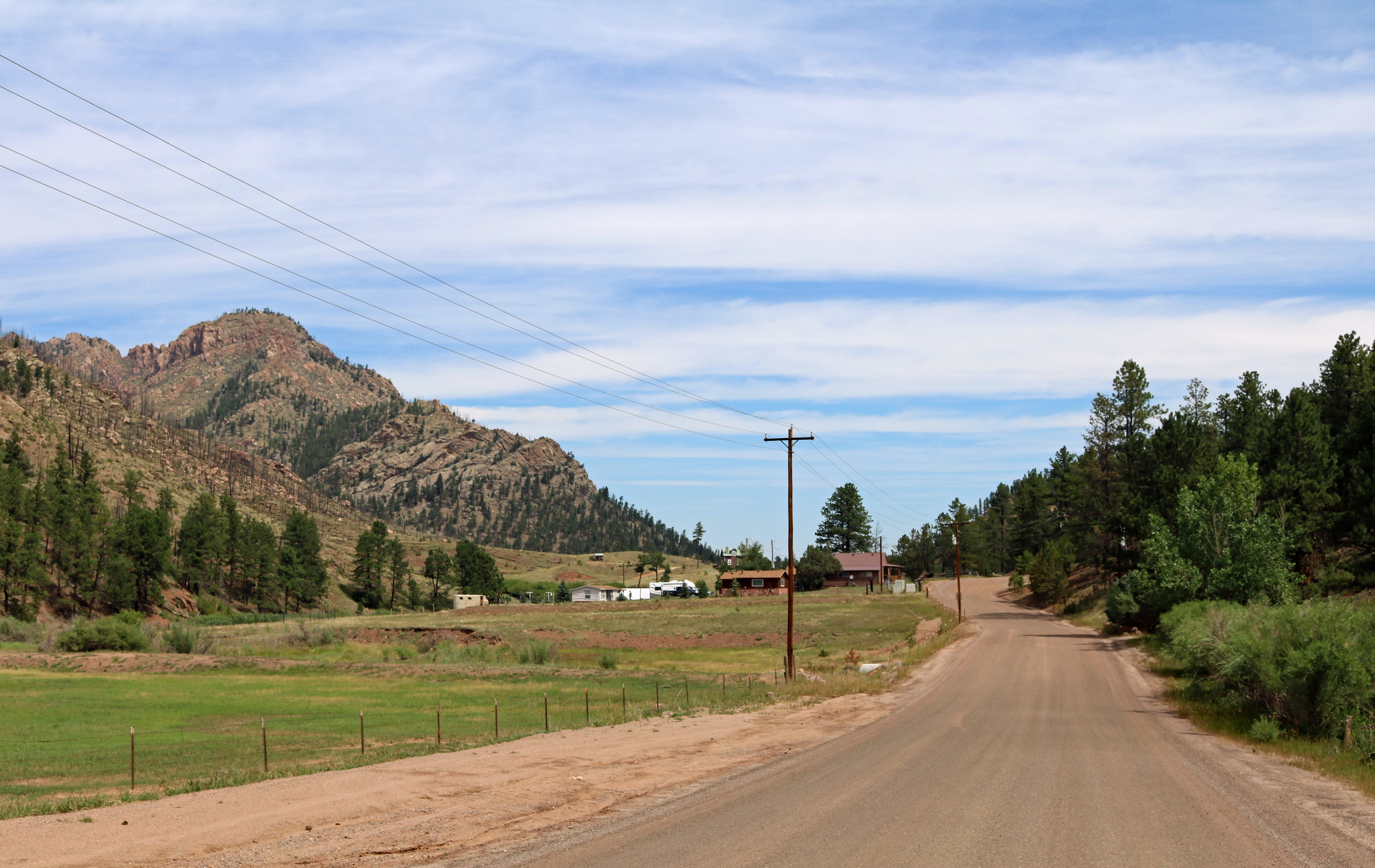
- Westcreek Road in Westcreek.

- Location of the Westcreek CDP in Douglas County, Colorado
- Coordinates: 39°09′00″N 105°09′45″W
- Country: United States
- State: Colorado
- County: Douglas County

Government
  - Type: Unincorporated community

Area
  - Total: 1.260 sq mi (3.263 km^{2})
  - Land: 1.218 sq mi (3.155 km^{2})
  - Water: 0.042 sq mi (0.108 km^{2})
- Elevation: 7,487 ft (2,282 m)

Population (2020)
  - Total: 120
  - Density: 99/sq mi (38/km^{2})
- Time zone: UTC-7 (MST)
  - Summer (DST): UTC-6 (MDT)
- ZIP Code: Sedalia 80135
- Area codes: 303 & 720
- GNIS feature ID: 2409571

Westcreek is an unincorporated community and a census-designated place (CDP) located in and governed by Douglas County, Colorado, United States. The CDP is a part of the Denver–Aurora–Lakewood, CO Metropolitan Statistical Area. The population of the Westcreek CDP was 120 at the United States Census 2020. The Sedalia post office (Zip Code 80135) serves the area.

== Geography ==
Westcreek is located in southwestern Douglas County. It is in the valley of West Creek, a north-flowing tributary of Horse Creek and part of the South Platte River watershed.

Colorado State Highway 67 passes through the community, leading north down the West Creek/Horse Creek valley 9 miles (14 km) to Deckers and southeast 15 miles (24 km) to Woodland Park.

The Westcreek CDP has an area of 806 acres (3.263 km^{2}), including 27 acres (0.108 km^{2}) of water.

== Demographics ==
The United States Census Bureau initially defined the Westcreek CDP for the United States Census 2000.

Westcreek CDP, Colorado
| Year | Pop. | ±% |
|---|---|---|
| 2000 | 105 | — |
| 2010 | 129 | +22.9% |
| 2020 | 120 | −7.0% |
Source: United States Census Bureau

== Education ==
The Douglas County School District covers the entire county, including Westcreek.

== See also ==
- Denver-Aurora-Boulder, CO Combined Statistical Area
- Denver-Aurora-Broomfield, CO Metropolitan Statistical Area
