= Acequia, Colorado =

Unincorporated community in Douglas County, Colorado, United States

- unincorporated community
- Location of Acequia, Colorado. Acequia (Colorado)
- Coordinates: 39°31′25″N 105°01′41″W
- Country: United States
- State: Colorado
- County: Douglas

Government
  - Type: Unincorporated community
  - Body: Douglas County
- Elevation: 5,554 ft (1,693 m)
- Time zone: UTC-7 (MST)
  - Summer (DST): UTC-6 (MDT)
- GNIS pop ID: 182621

Acequia is an unincorporated community located in Douglas County, Colorado, United States.

== History ==
The Acequia, Colorado Territory, post office operated from January 30, 1874, until June 9, 1881, and again from April 22, 1887, until July 14, 1900. Acequia is a Spanish word, taken from Andalusī Arabic "السِّاقِيَة", meaning "canal" or "channel", so the name was likely in reference to the nearby High Line Canal. Colorado became a state on August 1, 1876.

== See also ==
- Front Range Urban Corridor
- List of populated places in Colorado
