= Tiger, Colorado =

Ghost town in Summit County, Colorado

Tiger
- Mining ghost town
- Location within the state of Colorado
- Coordinates: 39°31′22″N 105°57′44″W
- Country: United States
- State: Colorado
- County: Summit
- Elevation: 9,669 ft (2,947 m)
- Time zone: UTC-7 (Mountain (MST))
  - Summer (DST): UTC-6 (MDT)
- ZIP codes: 80424
- GNIS feature ID: 203919

Tiger is an extinct town in Summit County, Colorado, United States.

A post office called Tiger was established in 1919, and remained in operation until 1940. The community took its name from the Royal Tiger Mines Company. The town site was destroyed before 1995 by the Forest Service in order to be used as a snowmobile track.
