= Dyersville, Colorado =

Ghost town in Summit County, Colorado, United States

- ghost town
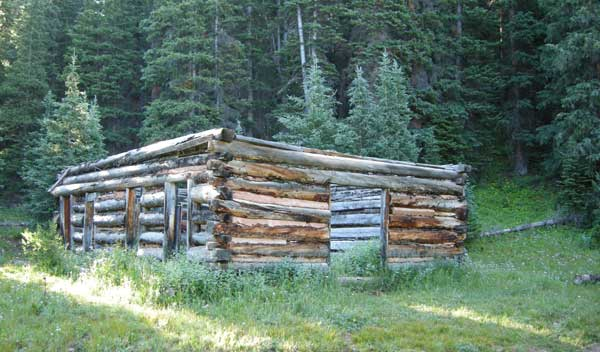
- The remains of Dyersville.

- Location of Dyersville, Colorado. Dyersville (Colorado)
- Coordinates: 39.4205°N 105.9839°W
- Country: United States
- State: Colorado
- County: Summit
- Elevation: 10,880 ft (3,320 m)
- Time zone: UTC−07:00 (MST)
  - Summer (DST): UTC−06:00 (MDT)
- ZIP code: (Breckenridge) 80424
- Area codes: 970/748

Dyersville was a mining town — now a ghost town — in Summit County, Colorado, United States. It was named after Methodist minister John Lewis Dyer. Nothing remains of the town except the roofless walls of a couple of log cabins.

== History ==
Methodist minister and prospector John Lewis Dyer, better known as "Father" Dyer, built a cabin in a secluded location along the upper reaches of Indiana Creek in January 1881. He was soon joined in his seclusion by miners and merchants connected to the nearby Warrior's Mark mine. The community named itself after its first resident, Father Dyer. The community never had its own post office. The Breckenridge, Colorado, post office (ZIP code 80424) serves the area.

== Notable residents ==
- John Lewis Dyer, pioneer Methodist minister.

== Geography ==
The site of Dyersville is located in Summit County in Indiana Gulch, 6 miles (10 km) southeast of Breckenridge.

== See also ==
- Breckenridge, CO Micropolitan Statistical Area
- List of ghost towns in Colorado
