= Parkville, Summit County, Colorado =

Ghost town in Summit County, Colorado

Parkville
- Ghost town
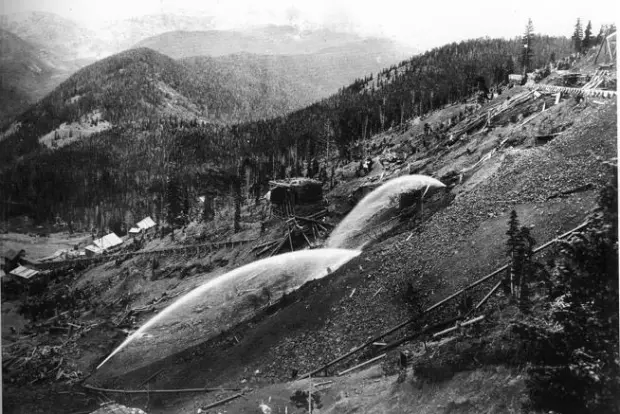
- Hydraulic mining on Farncomb Hill above Parkville, Colorado. This process ultimately led to the town being buried under waste rock.
- Interactive map of Parkville
- Coordinates: 39.4989°N 105.9500°W (Note: The Geographic Names Information System incorrectly gives the Parkville coordinates as 39.4988727, −106.9500441.)
- Country: United States
- State: Colorado
- County: Summit County
- Elevation: 9,980 ft (3,040 m)

Population
  - Total: 0

Parkville (also known as Park City) is a ghost town located in, and the original county seat of, Summit County, Colorado, United States. Parkville was a gold mining camp that flourished from 1860 to 1866 near the confluence of the middle and south forks of the Swan River.

== History ==
Parkville was established around 1860 in Georgia Gulch near Swan River, with cabins by 1861. The population of the site soon rose to around 1,800. When the new Territory of Colorado created its 17 original counties on November 1, 1861, Parkville was designated the Summit County seat. At its creation, Summit County covered roughly the entire northwest portion of the Colorado Territory. Parkville was the site of among the earliest Freemason lodges in Colorado, with Summit Lodge No.2 among the lodges established with the formation of the Grand Lodge of Colorado. The earliest minutes from the Summit County commissioners shows that they rented the Masonic hall for meetings and county and district court.

The region's gold rush drove much of Parkville's 1861 growth, with its discoveries among the most valuable in Colorado history; up to $800 (equivalent to $28,667 in 2025) of gold was mined daily. This saw the production of territorial gold token mintage at Parkville during the summer of 1861. These tokens–valued at $2.50, $5, and $10–were coined by J.J. Conway & Co. out of gold dust. These tokens did not look like standard U.S. coinage and were of varying fineness and weight, thus losing the confidence of the townsfolk.

Parkville, then the largest town in the region, was "the logical choice" to become the Summit County seat. Parkville lost a 1861 vote to become the territorial capital by eleven votes; after the county seat was moved to Breckenridge due to Parkville's lack of facilities, Parkville would become a ghost town by 1882. The former Parkville townsite is preserved as part of the Parkville Open Space, a 44-acre lot owned and operated by Summit County. By 1911, later hydraulic mining had buried much of the former townsite in waste rock and the Masonic cemetery is among the few remaining visible relics.

== See also ==
- List of ghost towns in Colorado
