= Adelaide, Fremont County, Colorado =

Ghost town in Fremont County, Colorado, United States

Adelaide, Colorado
- Ghost town
- Location of Adelaide, Colorado. Adelaide (Colorado)
- Coordinates: 38°33′36″N 105°05′27″W
- Country: United States
- State: Colorado
- County: Fremont

Government
  - Body: Fremont County
- Elevation: 6,949 ft (2,118 m)

Population (2010)
  - Total: 0
- Time zone: UTC−07:00 (MST)
  - Summer (DST): UTC−06:00 (MDT)
- GNIS pop ID: 191344

Adelaide is an extinct town located in Fremont County, Colorado, United States. Previously known as Robinson, the former mining camp is located along the Phantom Canyon Road. The Adelaide Bridge is located just north of the townsite.

== History ==
Prior to the construction of the railroad bridge, the town was named "Robinson." The Adelaide post office operated from November 15, 1894, until November 15, 1901.

In 1894, the Adelaide Bridge was constructed as a 210-foot-long, 20-foot-wide narrow-gauge railroad passage for the Florence and Cripple Creek Railroad to carry gold mined in the region. The bridge and track were abandoned in 1912 and the railroad went out of business in 1915. The bridge was added to the National Register of Historic Places in 1985.

== See also ==
- Cañon City, CO Micropolitan Statistical Area
- List of ghost towns in Colorado
