= Saints John, Colorado =

Former town in Summit County, Colorado

Saints John
- Mining ghost town
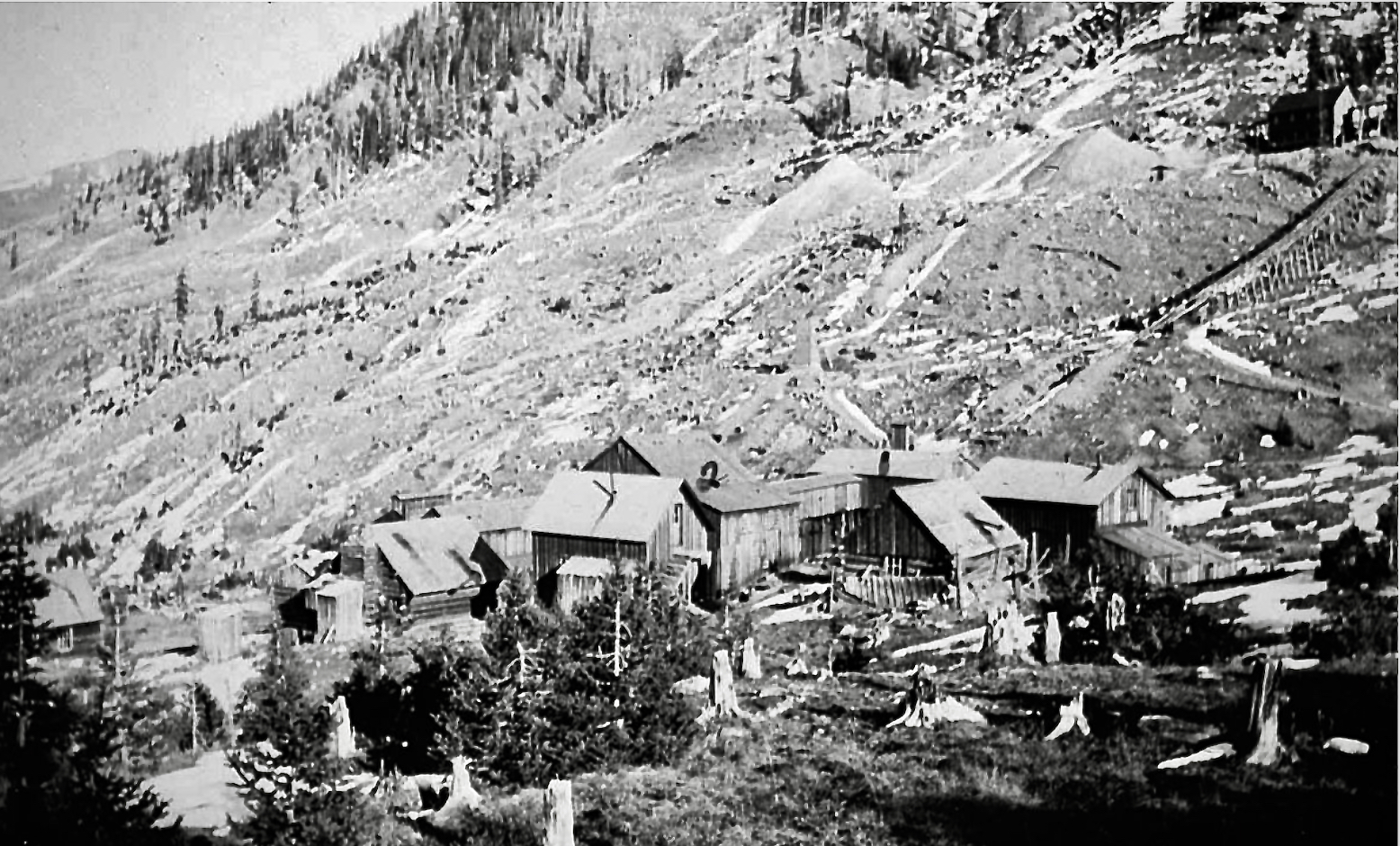
- View of Saints John around 1880

- Location within the state of Colorado
- Coordinates: 39°34′18″N 105°52′54″W
- Country: United States
- State: Colorado
- County: Summit
- Elevation: 10,764 ft (3,281 m)
- Time zone: UTC-7 (Mountain (MST))
  - Summer (DST): UTC-6 (MDT)
- GNIS feature ID: 182364

Saints John, originally called Coleyville and later Saint John, is a former silver-mining town in Summit County, Colorado. About a mile from the town of Montezuma, Saints John was the site of one of the first silver discoveries in Colorado. Although no longer a town, it still has several inhabitants.

== History ==
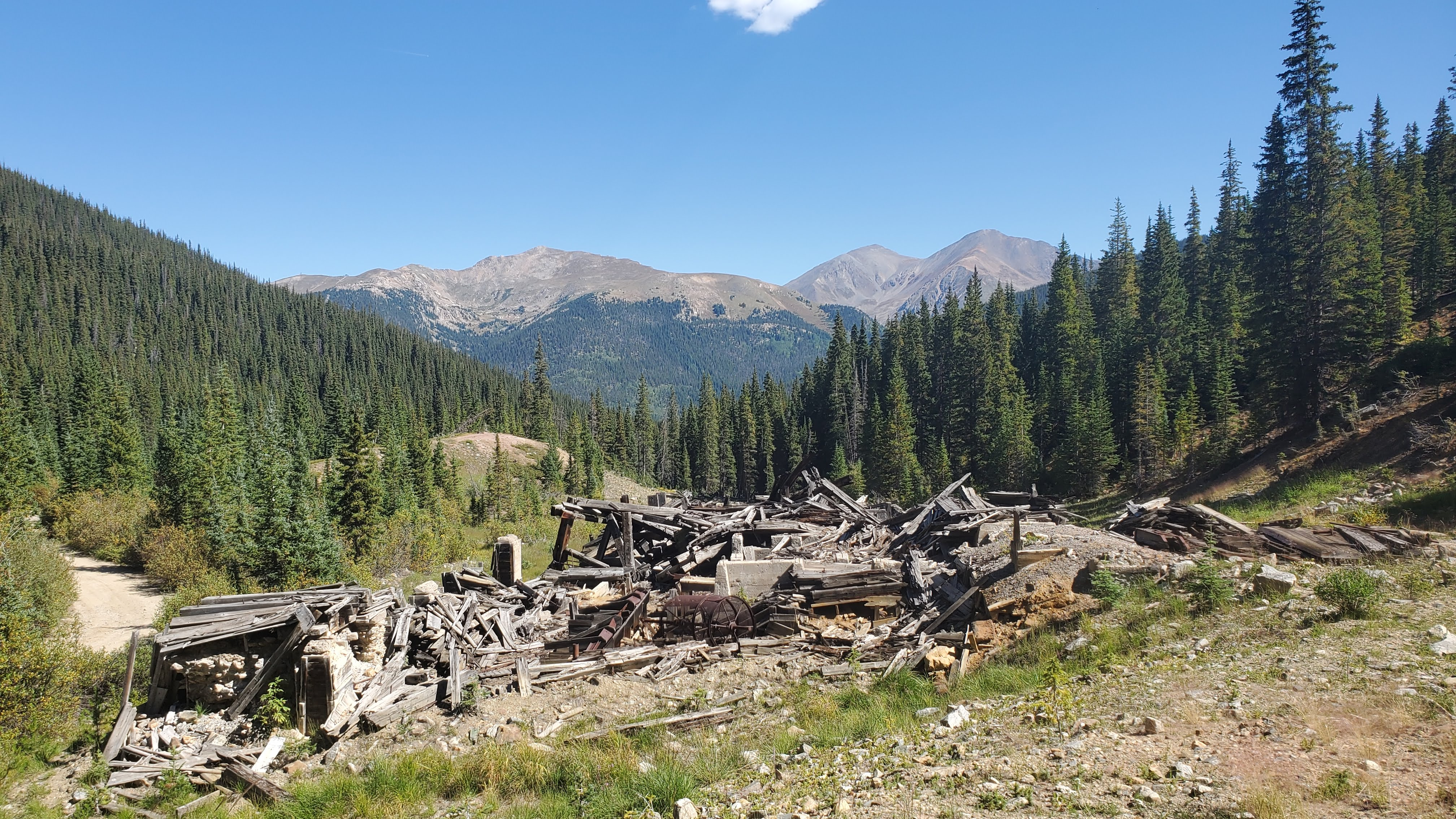
Remains of the Saints John Mill in September 2022

A prospector named Coley discovered silver in 1863 or 1864 on the slope of Glacier Mountain, and built a crude furnace to extract silver from the ore. Other prospectors followed, including John Cullom, who discovered the Saints John Lode. In 1867, he sold the Saints John lode to the Boston Silver Mining Company, which built an ore mill, next to which grew the town, originally called Coleyville. The mining at Glacier Mountain was usually expensive and was burdensome upon the up to 50 townsfolk in the early years. In the 1870 census, the town name had changed to Saints John by local Masons when it had a population of 71, which made it the largest incorporated town in Summit County.

The fortunes of the town followed those of the Saints John mine. The mine ceased working in 1928. The remaining population of Saints John mostly transplanted to nearby Montezuma. Several structures remain, including the home of the mine's superintendent and the ruins of mining buildings.

== Geography ==
The site accessible by dirt road from Montezuma. Saints John Creek flows through both the ghost town and present-day Montezuma.

== See also ==
- List of ghost towns in Colorado
