= Keystone, Colorado =

Home-rule town in Summit County, CO, USA

- Home rule municipality
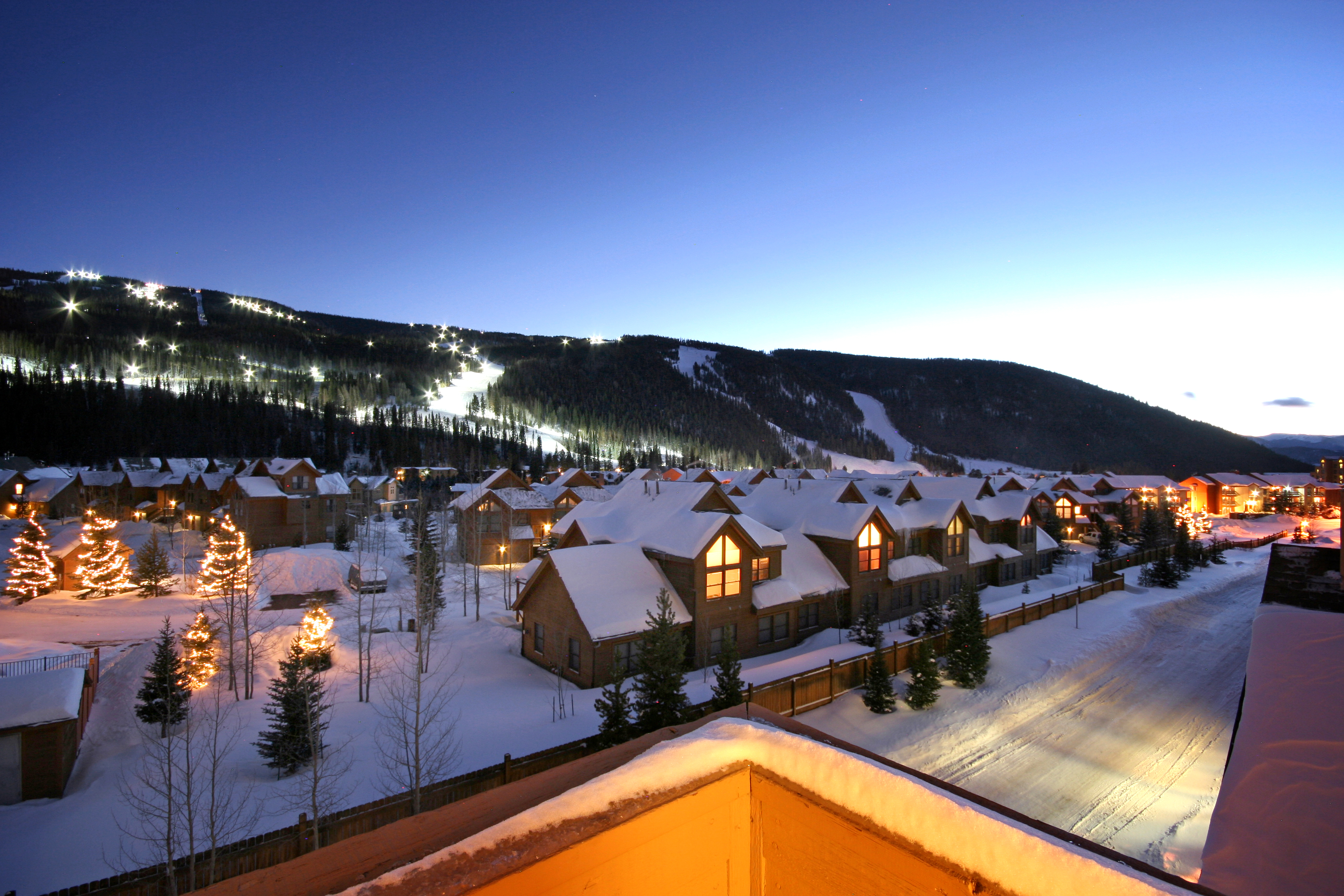
- Keystone in January 2011.

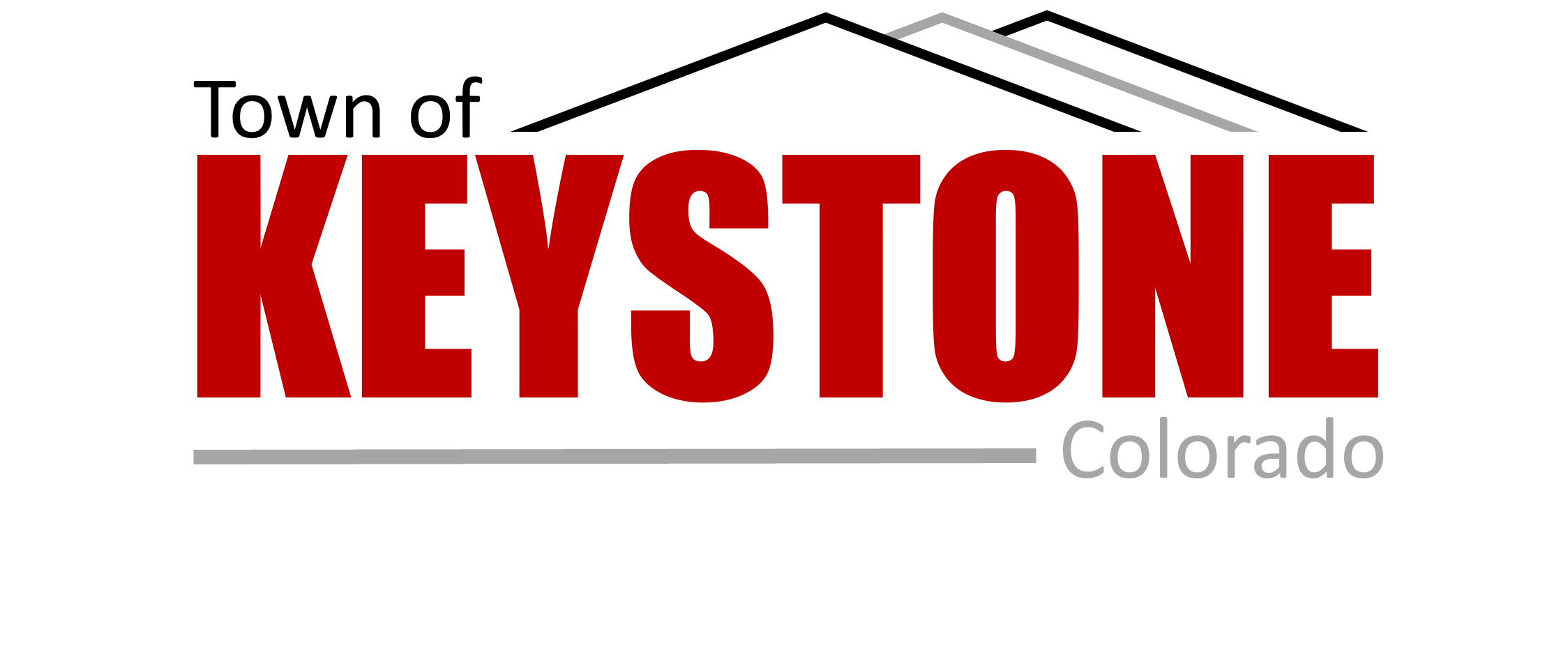
- Logo

- Location of Keystone in Summit County, Colorado

- Location of Keystone in the United States.
- Coordinates: 39°35′24″N 105°56′18″W
- Country: United States
- State: Colorado
- County: Summit County
- Established: 2024
- Incorporated (town): April 3, 2023

Government
  - Type: Home rule town

Area
  - Total: 41.435 sq mi (107.316 km^{2})
  - Land: 41.402 sq mi (107.230 km^{2})
  - Water: 0.033 sq mi (0.086 km^{2})
- Elevation: 10,794 ft (3,290 m)

Population (2020)
  - Total: 1,369
  - Density: 33.07/sq mi (12.77/km^{2})
- Time zone: UTC-7 (MST)
  - Summer (DST): UTC-6 (MDT)
- ZIP Code: 80435
- Area code: 970
- GNIS feature: 2408479
- Website: keystone.colorado.gov

Keystone is a home rule town located in Summit County, Colorado, United States. The town is a part of the Breckenridge, CO Micropolitan Statistical Area. Keystone residents voted to incorporate on March 28, 2023, becoming a municipality on April 3, 2023. The municipality includes the Keystone Resort and Keystone Village. The population of the former Keystone census-designated place (CDP) was 1,369 at the United States Census 2020. However, the boundary of the current municipality encompasses a smaller geographic area than the boundary of the former CDP. The United States Census Bureau estimated the population of the Town of Keystone as 1,274 on July 1, 2025. The Dillon post office (Zip Code 80435) serves Keystone postal addresses.

== Geography ==
The former Keystone CDP had an area of 26,518 acres (107.316 km^{2}), including 21 acres (0.086 km^{2}) of water.

== Demographics ==
The United States Census Bureau initially defined the Keystone CDP for the United States Census 2000.

Keystone CDP, Colorado
| Year | Pop. | ±% |
|---|---|---|
| 2000 | 825 | — |
| 2010 | 1,079 | +30.8% |
| 2020 | 1,369 | +26.9% |
Source: United States Census Bureau

=== 2020 census ===
As of the 2020 census, Keystone had a population of 1,369. The median age was 35.5 years. 6.2% of residents were under the age of 18 and 15.3% of residents were 65 years of age or older. For every 100 females there were 133.6 males, and for every 100 females age 18 and over there were 133.0 males age 18 and over.

42.4% of residents lived in urban areas, while 57.6% lived in rural areas.

There were 616 households in Keystone, of which 11.2% had children under the age of 18 living in them. Of all households, 31.2% were married-couple households, 43.2% were households with a male householder and no spouse or partner present, and 18.5% were households with a female householder and no spouse or partner present. About 40.9% of all households were made up of individuals and 8.4% had someone living alone who was 65 years of age or older.

There were 3,432 housing units, of which 82.1% were vacant. The homeowner vacancy rate was 4.0% and the rental vacancy rate was 54.7%.

Racial composition as of the 2020 census
| Race | Number | Percent |
|---|---|---|
| White | 1,111 | 81.2% |
| Black or African American | 11 | 0.8% |
| American Indian and Alaska Native | 9 | 0.7% |
| Asian | 44 | 3.2% |
| Native Hawaiian and Other Pacific Islander | 3 | 0.2% |
| Some other race | 121 | 8.8% |
| Two or more races | 70 | 5.1% |
| Hispanic or Latino (of any race) | 179 | 13.1% |

== Keystone Resort ==
Keystone Resort was originally constructed in the 1970s by Ralston Purina. It is now owned by Vail Resorts. The Keystone Resort ski area occupies three separate mountains: Dercum Mountain, North Peak, and The Outback. Recent expansion of terrain and services offers snowcat skiing in Independence Bowl, Bergman Bowl, Erickson Bowl, in addition to the existing North Bowl and South Bowl on Wapiti Peak. The resort has many summer and winter outdoor activities. The winter activities include alpine skiing, snowboarding, tubing, ice-skating, cross-country skiing, horse-drawn sleigh ride dinners, snowshoeing and snowmobiling. The summer activities include hiking, mountain biking, cycling, fishing, trail running, golf on two championship courses, and paddle boating or stand up paddle boarding on Keystone Lake. Keystone is also home to a number of popular vibrant summer festivals, including the long-time running Bluegrass and Beer Festival.

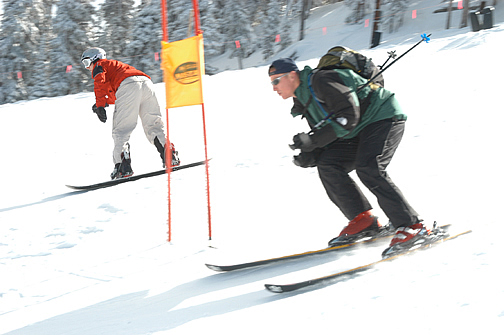
Members of the US Air Force skiing at Keystone Resort's 14th Annual SnoFest

The Keystone ski area has:

- 2,870 acres (11.6 km^{2})
- 3,128 feet (953 m) vertical
- Base elevation: 9,280 feet (2,830 m)
- Summit elevation: 12,408 feet (3,782 m)
- 131 trails
- Degree of difficulty percentages for trails: Easiest-14 percent, More Difficult-29 percent, Most Difficult-57 percent
- 20 Lifts including 2 gondolas, 2 express six-pack and 4 high speed quads.
- The only Night skiing in the area.

Keystone is only a short drive from other resorts in Summit County - about 10 minutes to Arapahoe Basin, 20 minutes to Breckenridge, and 20 minutes to Copper Mountain.

== See also ==
- Silverthorne, CO Micropolitan Statistical Area
- White River National Forest
