= Clinton Gulch Dam Reservoir =

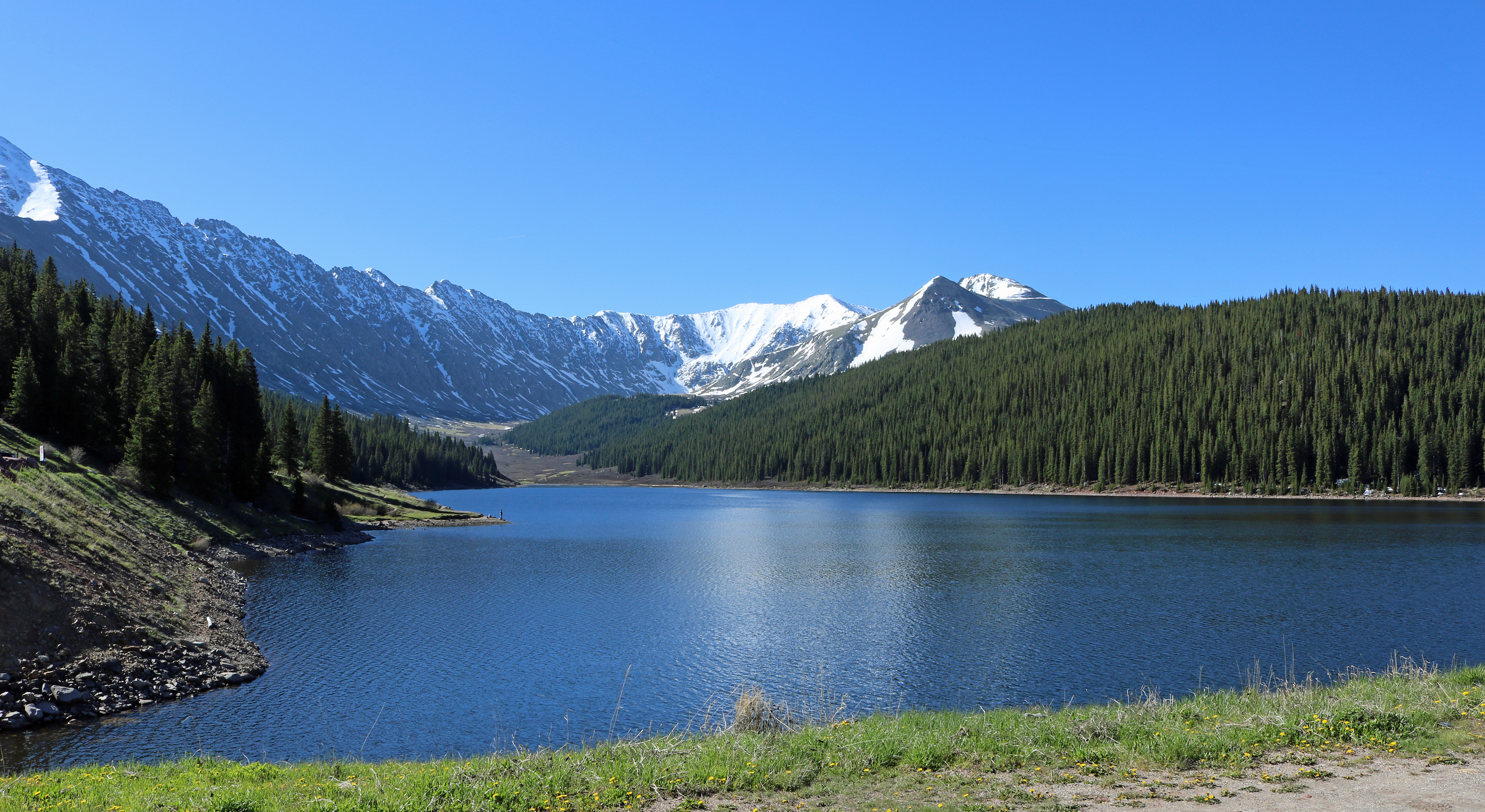
- The reservoir in 2023

- The reservoir's location in Colorado
- Location: Summit County, Colorado
- Coordinates: 39°24′52″N 106°10′24″W
- Type: Reservoir
- Primary inflows: Clinton Creek
- Primary outflows: Clinton Creek
- Basin countries: United States
- Managing agency: Clinton Ditch & Reservoir Company
- Built: 1977
- Water volume: 5,915 acre-feet (7,296,000 m^{3})
- Surface elevation: 11,064 ft (3,372 m)
- Frozen: Freezes in winter

Clinton Gulch Dam Reservoir is a reservoir in Summit County, Colorado, near Fremont Pass. It supplies water for irrigation, municipal water supply, and snowmaking. Colorado State Highway 91 goes over the top of the dam.

Water from the reservoir makes its way to Tenmile Creek. It then flows through Dillon Reservoir and to the Blue River, from where it is distributed.

== History ==
The reservoir was built in 1977 by the Climax Molybdenum Company, whose mine is located nearby at Fremont Pass. In 1992, Climax Molybdenum sold the reservoir to the Clinton Ditch & Reservoir Company, which has shareholders that include farms, municipalities in Summit and Grand counties, and several ski areas who use the water for snowmaking.

== Dam ==
The dam, NID ID CO02093, is a 175-foot (53-meter) high earthen dam that can store up to 5,915 acre-feet (7,296,000 cubic meters) of water. It was built in 1977 and is 1,550 feet (470 meters) wide.

== Recreation ==
A hiking trail encircles the lake. Rated easy, the trail is 2.4 miles (3.9 kilometers) long and has an elevation gain of 230 feet (70 meters). Parking is available at both ends of the dam.

The reservoir also offers fishing, including ice fishing in the winter. It is stocked with cutthroat trout, and rainbow and brown trout can also be caught.
