= Williams Peak (Colorado) =

Mountain in the State of Colorado

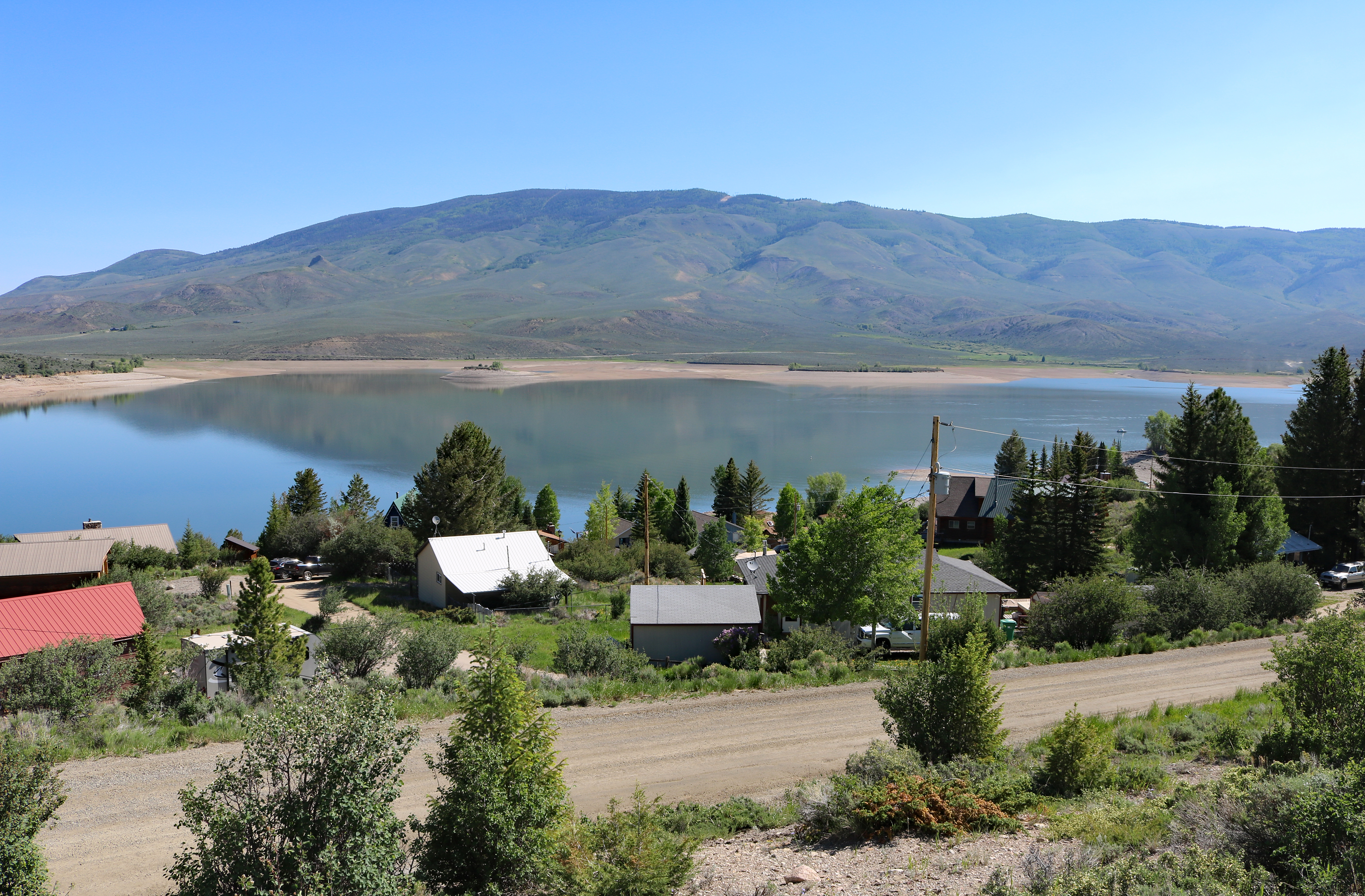
- The peak viewed from Heeney, Colorado, on the west side of Green Mountain Reservoir.

Highest point
- Elevation: 11,620 ft (3,540 m)
- Prominence: 2,049 ft (625 m)
- Isolation: 8.66 mi (13.94 km)
- Listing: Colorado prominent summits
- Coordinates: 39°51′19″N 106°11′07″W

Geography
- Location within Colorado Location within the United States
- Location: Grand and Summit counties, Colorado, United States
- Parent range: Front Range, South Williams Fork Mountains
- Topo map(s): USGS 7.5' topographic map Battle Mountain, Colorado

Climbing
- Easiest route: hike

Williams Peak, elevation 11,620 ft (3,542 m), is a summit in the Front Range of Colorado. The peak is 19 mi (31 km) southeast of Kremmling in the Arapaho National Forest.

== See also ==
- List of Colorado mountain ranges
- List of Colorado mountain summits
  - List of Colorado fourteeners
  - List of Colorado 4000 meter prominent summits
  - List of the most prominent summits of Colorado
- List of Colorado county high points
