= Swan River (Colorado) =

Physical characteristics
- Source
  - location: Confluence of South Fork and Middle Fork
  - coordinates: 39°29′48″N 105°56′43″W
- Mouth
  - location: Confluence with Blue
  - coordinates: 39°32′47″N 106°02′18″W
  - elevation: 9,153 ft (2,790 m)

Basin features
- Progression: Blue—Colorado

The Swan River is a short tributary of the Blue River, approximately 10 miles (16 km) long, located in the Rocky Mountains of central Colorado in the United States. The river drains a mountainous area in the upper basin of the Blue River in southern Summit County. It rises in three short forks along the continental divide in the Arapaho National Forest east of Breckenridge. It descends through a narrow valley to the west, joining the Blue from the east approximately 5 miles (8 km) north Breckenridge, along State Highway 9 between Breckenridge and Frisco. The valley of the river was historical site of mining camps during the late 19th century, with many remains of early camps and mine tailings remaining along the canyon walls.

== See also ==
- List of rivers of Colorado
- List of tributaries of the Colorado River
