= Middle Fork Swan River =

Physical characteristics
- Source
  - coordinates: 39°30′44″N 105°51′50″W
- Mouth
  - location: Confluence with South Fork
  - coordinates: 39°29′48″N 105°56′43″W

Basin features
- Progression: Swan—Blue—Colorado

Middle Fork Swan River is a tributary of the Swan River in Summit County, Colorado. The stream flows west from a source in the Arapaho National Forest to a confluence with the South Fork Swan River that forms the Swan River.

== See also ==
- List of rivers of Colorado
