= South Fork Swan River =

Physical characteristics
- Source
  - coordinates: 39°27′36″N 105°56′50″W
- Mouth
  - location: Confluence with Middle Fork
  - coordinates: 39°29′48″N 105°56′43″W

Basin features
- Progression: Swan—Blue—Colorado

South Fork Swan River is a tributary of the Swan River in Summit County, Colorado. The stream flows northwest from a source near Georgia Pass in the Arapaho National Forest to a confluence with the Middle Fork Swan River that forms the Swan River.

== See also ==
- List of rivers of Colorado
