= Kokomo, Colorado =

Ghost town in Summit County, Colorado

Kokomo
- Mining ghost town
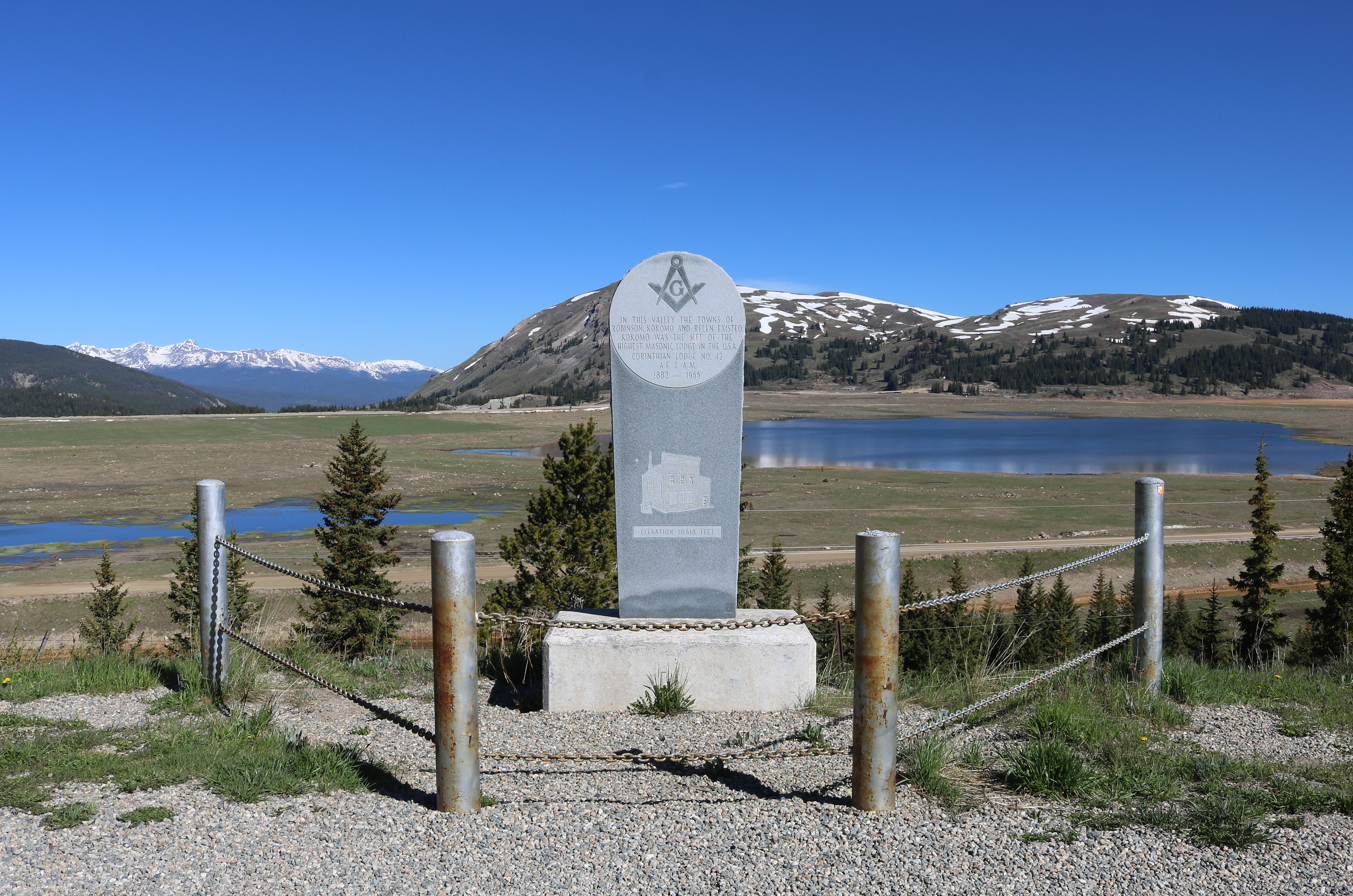
- The Kokomo historical marker along State Highway 91

- Location within the state of Colorado
- Coordinates: 39°25′27″N 106°11′23″W
- Country: United States
- State: Colorado
- County: Summit
- Elevation: 10,695 ft (3,260 m)

Population (2010)
  - Total: 0
- Time zone: UTC-7 (Mountain (MST))
  - Summer (DST): UTC-6 (MDT)
- ZIP codes: 80424
- GNIS feature ID: 179601

Kokomo is a silver- and gold-mining ghost town in Summit County, in the U.S. state of Colorado. Before being depopulated in the 1960s, Kokomo was at its height home to over 10,000 people.

== History ==
The community took its name from nearby Kokomo Gulch which was named after Kokomo, Indiana. Some placer gold was discovered in the 1860s, but intensive mining did not begin until after the sharp increase of mining at Leadville in 1877. A post office called Kokomo was established in 1879, and remained in operation until 1965. A neighboring community, Recen, was heavily intertwined with Kokomo. The original town constructed of wood burned in 1879. The town burned again in 1881, marking the beginning of decline and resulting in a merger with the community of Recen. Also in 1881, the first Free Mason meeting was held, and a lodge was opened in 1882. A historical marker near the old townsite recognizes the lodge, which existed until 1966.

In the 1890s, Kokomo was at the highest elevation (10,618 feet) of any incorporated town in the state. The town reached zero population in the 1960s when the land was bought by Climax Molybdenum Company to use as a tailings dump.
