= Fremont Pass (Colorado) =

Mountain pass in Colorado, USA

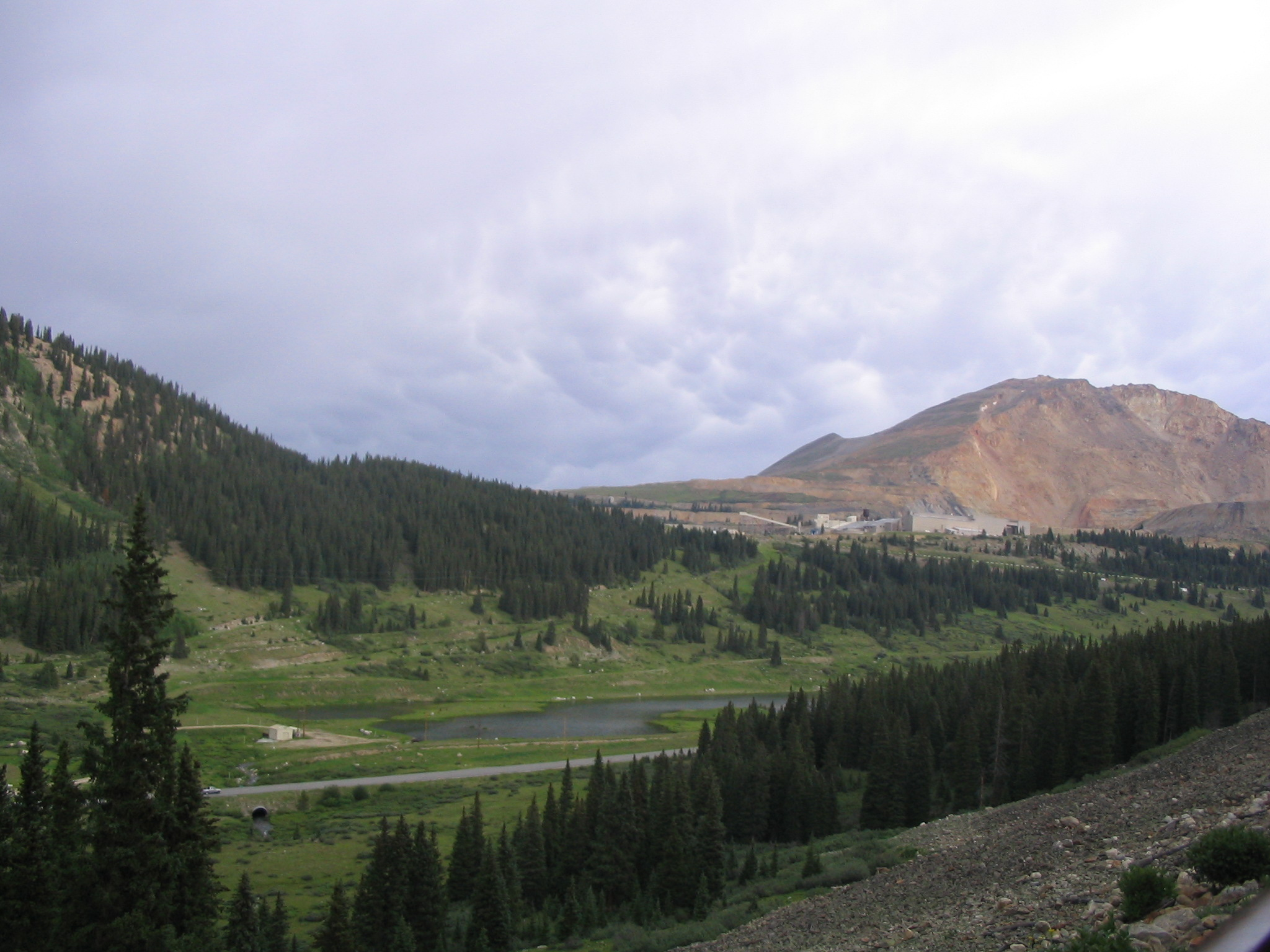
- Fremont Pass and the Climax mine

- Location within Colorado
- Elevation: 11,318 ft (3,450 m)
- Traversed by: SH 91

Third Approach
- Location: Lake County, Colorado, United States
- Range: Rocky Mountains
- Coordinates: 39°21′59″N 106°11′12″W
- Topo map: USGS Climax

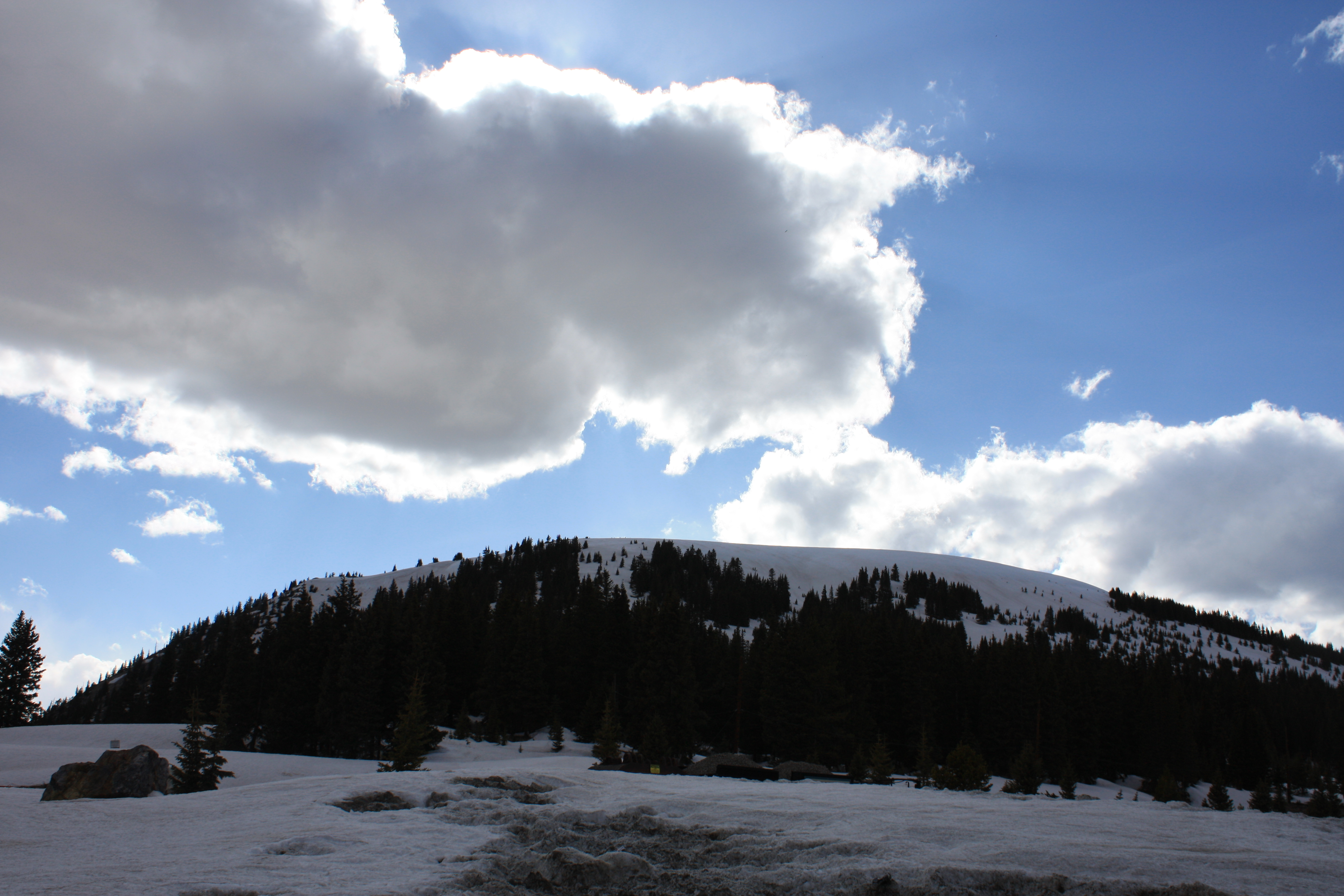
View from Fremont Pass, May 2009

Fremont Pass is a 11,318-foot (3,450 m) mountain pass in central Colorado, in the Rocky Mountains of the western United States.

It forms the continental divide on the border between Lake County and Summit County. The pass is named for John C. Frémont, an explorer of the American West who discovered the pass while traversing present-day Colorado during the 1840s. The pass provides a route between the upper valley of the Blue River, a tributary of the Colorado River, with the headwaters of the Arkansas River to the south. The pass summit is the site of Climax Mine, a molybdenum mine. The pass is traversed by State Highway 91.

Despite being one of the highest mountain passes in the state, the only steep part is the switchback on the final ascent toward the Climax mine on the south side. The rest of the pass is gentle.

== Climate ==
Climate data for Fremont Pass, Colorado, 1991–2020 normals, 1985-2020 extremes: 11400ft (3475m)
Month	Jan	Feb	Mar	Apr	May	Jun	Jul	Aug	Sep	Oct	Nov	Dec	Year
Record high °F (°C)	46 (8)	47 (8)	58 (14)	62 (17)	70 (21)	75 (24)	78 (26)	84 (29)	84 (29)	64 (18)	56 (13)	45 (7)	84 (29)
Mean maximum °F (°C)	39 (4)	42 (6)	50 (10)	56 (13)	63 (17)	69 (21)	72 (22)	70 (21)	66 (19)	57 (14)	47 (8)	38 (3)	73 (23)
Mean daily maximum °F (°C)	24.8 (−4.0)	27.4 (−2.6)	34.9 (1.6)	41.5 (5.3)	50.7 (10.4)	59.7 (15.4)	64.8 (18.2)	62.3 (16.8)	56.0 (13.3)	44.4 (6.9)	32.4 (0.2)	24.3 (−4.3)	43.6 (6.4)
Daily mean °F (°C)	15.0 (−9.4)	16.6 (−8.6)	23.0 (−5.0)	29.4 (−1.4)	38.6 (3.7)	47.5 (8.6)	52.7 (11.5)	50.6 (10.3)	44.5 (6.9)	33.9 (1.1)	22.5 (−5.3)	14.9 (−9.5)	32.4 (0.2)
Mean daily minimum °F (°C)	5.1 (−14.9)	5.6 (−14.7)	11.0 (−11.7)	17.2 (−8.2)	26.5 (−3.1)	35.3 (1.8)	40.6 (4.8)	38.9 (3.8)	33.0 (0.6)	23.4 (−4.8)	12.6 (−10.8)	5.4 (−14.8)	21.2 (−6.0)
Mean minimum °F (°C)	−14 (−26)	−12 (−24)	−8 (−22)	1 (−17)	12 (−11)	24 (−4)	33 (1)	32 (0)	20 (−7)	5 (−15)	−8 (−22)	−16 (−27)	−18 (−28)
Record low °F (°C)	−29 (−34)	−35 (−37)	−22 (−30)	−10 (−23)	1 (−17)	5 (−15)	14 (−10)	13 (−11)	1 (−17)	−9 (−23)	−18 (−28)	−29 (−34)	−35 (−37)
Average precipitation inches (mm)	2.72 (69)	2.61 (66)	2.86 (73)	3.40 (86)	2.34 (59)	1.08 (27)	2.00 (51)	2.08 (53)	1.63 (41)	2.11 (54)	2.57 (65)	2.54 (65)	27.94 (709)
Source 1: XMACIS2
Source 2: NOAA (Precipitation)

== Railway ==
The Denver, South Park and Pacific Railroad built a narrow gauge railway over Fremont Pass in 1884. It was sold in foreclosure proceedings to the Denver, Leadville & Gunnison Railroad in 1889 and became later part of the Colorado and Southern Railway. Operations ended in 1937. The line south of Climax is retained, converted to 4 ft 8 1/2 in (1,435 mm) standard gauge in 1943 and now operated by Leadville, Colorado and Southern Railroad.

A second narrow gauge railway line was built by Denver and Rio Grande Railroad in 1881. Passenger service ceased in late 1909 and the last sporadic freight service in November 1910. The line was abandoned on 1 December 1923.

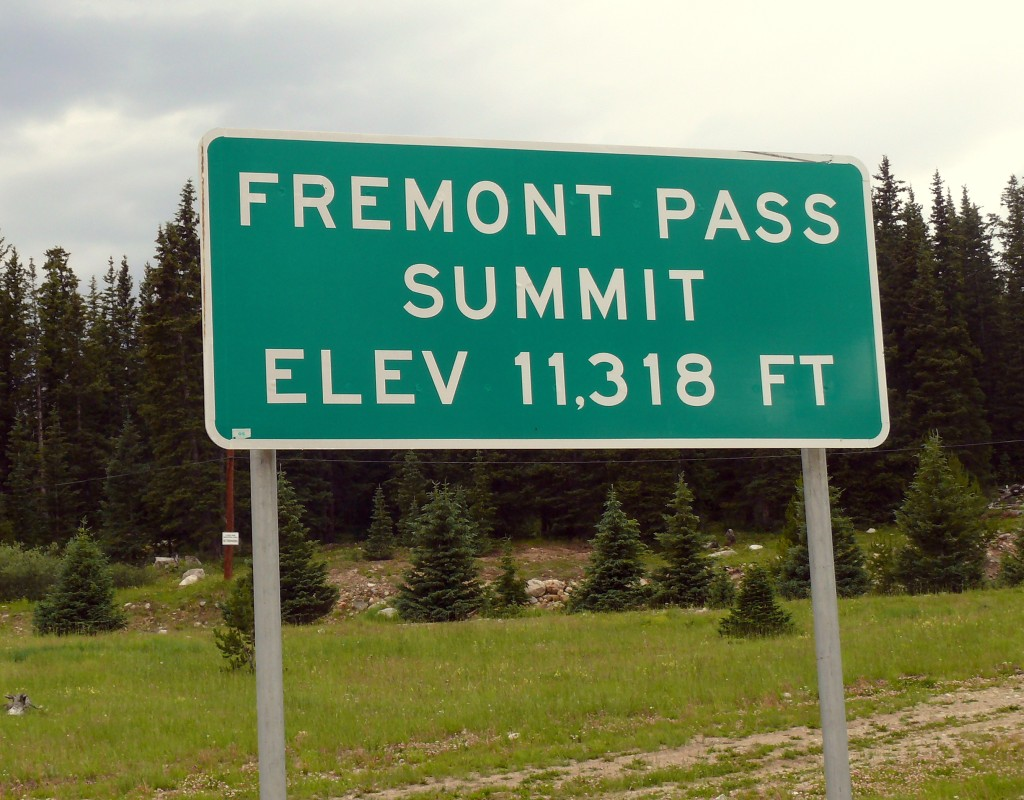
Fremont pass sign

== Electrical Power ==
In 1909, the Shoshone Transmission Line was built to connect a generating station near Glenwood Springs with Leadville and Denver. This historic electric transmission line has been modernized several times and is still in use, although the development of the Climax mine has caused major changes to the line in the vicinity of the pass.
