= Erbey Satterfield =

American politician (1939–2015)

Erbey Leland Satterfield (June 23, 1939 – January 8, 2015) was an American electrician, labor activist, and politician.

Born in Climax, Colorado, Satterfield enlisted in the United States Navy in 1957. He then went to Utah State University Eastern and Weber State University. Satterfield was an electrician, in Ogden, Utah, and active in the International Brotherhood of Electrical Workers. He also served on the Utah State Electrical Board. In December 1987, Satterfield was appointed to the Utah House of Representatives and served until 1988. He was a Democrat. Satterfield died in Ogden, Utah, a result of prostate cancer, he was seventy five, leaving four children, 12 grandchildren, and 12 great grandchildren.
