= Climax, Colorado =

Ghost town in Colorado, US

- Ghost town
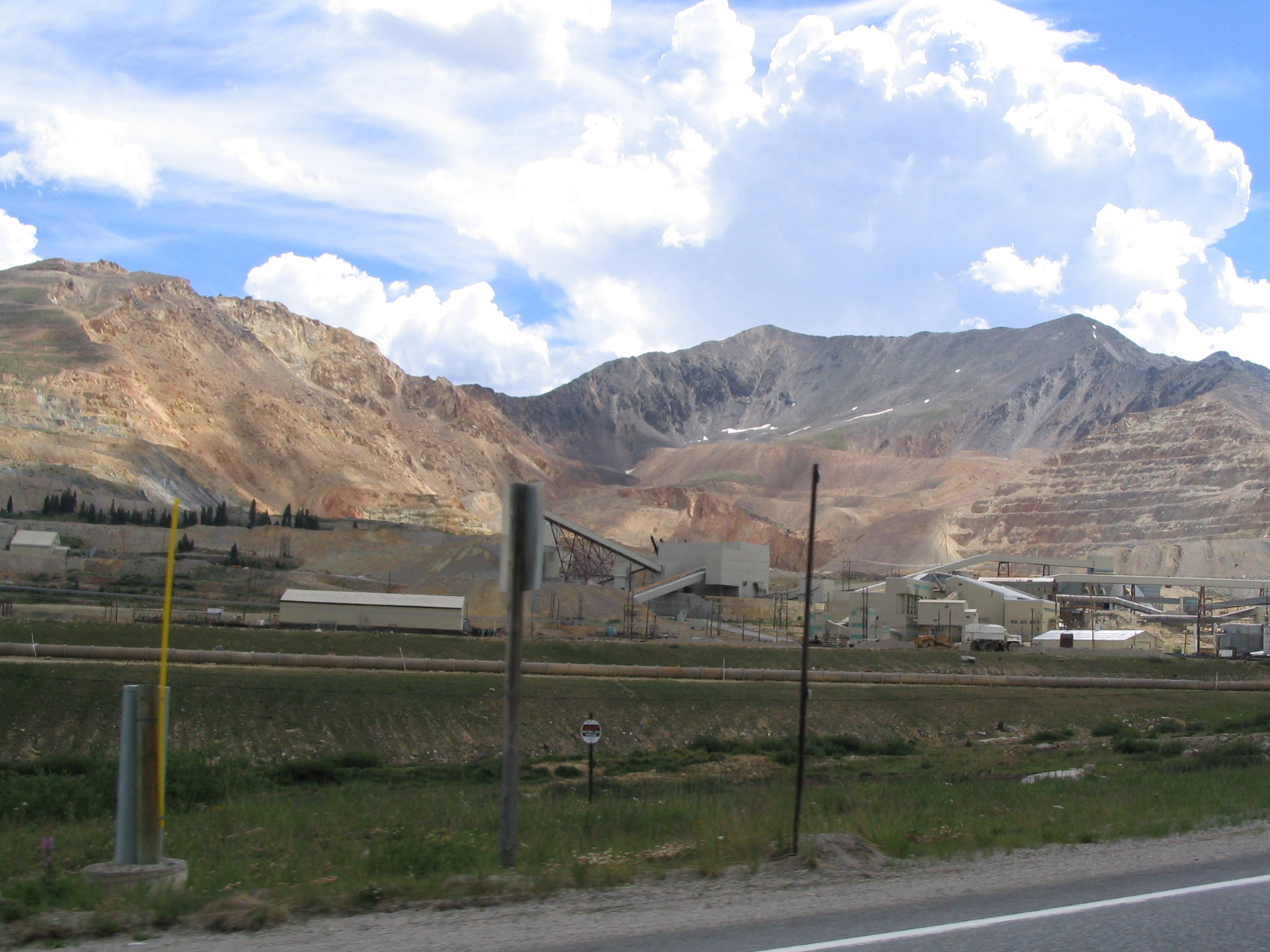
- Climax mine, 2005

- Location of Climax, Colorado. Climax (Colorado)
- Coordinates: 39°22′08″N 106°11′01″W
- Country: United States
- State: Colorado
- County: Lake

Government
  - Type: Ghost town
  - Body: Lake County
- Elevation: 11,341 ft (3,457 m)
- Time zone: UTC−07:00 (MST)
  - Summer (DST): UTC−06:00 (MDT)
- ZIP code: Leadville 80429

Climax is an extinct mining company town, railroad station, and post office located in Lake County, Colorado, United States. The town site is located at an elevation of 11,341 feet (3,457 m) at Fremont Pass on the Continental Divide of the Americas. Climax's reason for being was its huge deposit of molybdenum ore. The Climax post office operated from 1887 until 1898, and from 1917 until 1974; the town was razed in 1962 to make way for the enlarging Climax mine, owned by Freeport-McMoRan.

From 1940 to 1972 the National Center for Atmospheric Research (NCAR) operated a High Altitude Observatory for solar research nearby.

== History ==
The Climax station on the Denver, South Park and Pacific Railroad was the highest railroad station in North America from its construction in 1884 until 1904 and again from 1928 until it was removed in 1937. The Climax, Colorado, post office operated from April 22, 1887, until April 12, 1898, and then again from December 5, 1917, until January 7, 1974, despite the fact that the town was razed in 1962 to make room for the expansion of the Climax Molybdenum Mine, Climax had the highest elevation post office in the United States from April 1, 1919, until its closure on January 1, 1974.

Climax's reason for being is its huge deposit of molybdenum ore. The Climax mine was the largest molybdenum mine in the world, and for many years it supplied three-fourths of the world's supply of the metal. Over the years it evolved from "at times the largest underground mine in the world" into a pit mine.

A High Altitude Observatory was located nearby for solar research from 1940 to 1972 by the National Center for Atmospheric Research (NCAR). After mining ceased, the residential houses were all transported to the West Park subdivision of Leadville, Colorado, in 1962, leaving only the mining buildings standing. The front office is part of the former jail. After a 17-year shutdown, the Climax mine reopened and resumed shipment of molybdenum on May 10, 2012.

The village of Climax is now considered a ghost town. The former Colorado & Southern Railway line from Leadville is operated as a tourist line by Leadville, Colorado & Southern Railroad. The line stops at an overview of the Climax Molybdenum Mine and Fremont Pass. Climax is a destination for automobile tourists, bicyclists, and photographers, but lacking commercial enterprise, the location is not well advertised.

== Notable people ==
- Erbey Satterfield, Utah state legislator, was born in Climax.
- Dave Gorsuch, Olympian, was born in Climax.

== Climate ==
With a mean annual temperature of 30.7 °F or −0.7 °C, Climax is not only the highest but also the coldest settlement ever established in the contiguous US, being probably the only one with a mean annual temperature below freezing point. The town has a borderline subalpine climate (Köppen Dfc), closely bordering on an alpine climate (ETH) with short, mild summers and long, snowy winters. The annual snowfall is, as would be expected, extremely heavy at 294.7 inches (7.5 m), with the record for a full season being 383.0 inches (9.73 m) between July 1961 and June 1962, and the most in one month 105.3 inches (2.67 m) during December 1983. Snow does not melt until June and after wet winters may accumulate into May – the maximum daily snow cover was 94 inches (2.39 m) on March, 8th, 2019. Precipitation falls off in June, but the tail end of the monsoon may cause thunderstorm activity in July and August. The wettest calendar year has been 2014 with 32.81 inches (833.4 mm) and the driest 1989 when only a water equivalent of 13.53 inches (343.7 mm) was gauged.

The high elevation means that Climax has consistently cold temperatures throughout the year, with frosts possible in any month and 53.5 mornings falling to or below 0 °F or −17.8 °C. The average window for zero temperatures is from November 1 to April 10, though temperatures that low have been reported as late as May 11, 1953 and as early as October 10 of 1982. Climax's 99.6 days that do not top freezing is also the most in the contiguous US – the average window for days not topping freezing being from October 11 to May 4, and cases as late as June 25, 1969 and as early as September 3 of 1961 are known. The high altitude, however, limits extreme minima as in the coldest weather Climax may be warmer than lower valleys; the record low being −33 °F (−36.1 °C) on January 12, 1963, and December 23, 1990. The hottest temperature has been 85 °F or 29.4 °C on July 7, 1981; 1981 was also the hottest full year at 33.3 °F or 0.7 °C, whilst 1973 with an annual mean of 28.7 °F or −1.8 °C is the coldest calendar year. The hottest month has been July 2003 with a mean of 57.7 °F (14.3 °C); the coldest has been January 1979 which averaged 6.1 °F (−14.4 °C).

Climate data for Climax, Colorado, 1991–2020 normals, extremes 1895–present
Month	Jan	Feb	Mar	Apr	May	Jun	Jul	Aug	Sep	Oct	Nov	Dec	Year
Record high °F (°C)	50 (10)	53 (12)	57 (14)	62 (17)	71 (22)	78 (26)	85 (29)	84 (29)	82 (28)	73 (23)	60 (16)	52 (11)	85 (29)
Mean maximum °F (°C)	42.5 (5.8)	43.6 (6.4)	49.2 (9.6)	53.5 (11.9)	62.0 (16.7)	71.7 (22.1)	74.4 (23.6)	72.2 (22.3)	69.2 (20.7)	61.0 (16.1)	51.6 (10.9)	43.1 (6.2)	75.9 (24.4)
Mean daily maximum °F (°C)	26.7 (−2.9)	28.7 (−1.8)	35.3 (1.8)	40.3 (4.6)	48.8 (9.3)	61.2 (16.2)	66.8 (19.3)	64.1 (17.8)	58.1 (14.5)	46.8 (8.2)	35.2 (1.8)	26.5 (−3.1)	44.9 (7.1)
Daily mean °F (°C)	14.8 (−9.6)	16.0 (−8.9)	21.9 (−5.6)	27.6 (−2.4)	36.7 (2.6)	47.7 (8.7)	53.4 (11.9)	51.5 (10.8)	45.0 (7.2)	33.9 (1.1)	23.2 (−4.9)	14.8 (−9.6)	32.2 (0.1)
Mean daily minimum °F (°C)	2.9 (−16.2)	3.4 (−15.9)	8.4 (−13.1)	15.0 (−9.4)	24.6 (−4.1)	34.2 (1.2)	40.0 (4.4)	38.9 (3.8)	31.9 (−0.1)	20.9 (−6.2)	11.3 (−11.5)	3.2 (−16.0)	19.6 (−6.9)
Mean minimum °F (°C)	−16.4 (−26.9)	−14.2 (−25.7)	−9.2 (−22.9)	−1.8 (−18.8)	9.8 (−12.3)	22.4 (−5.3)	32.1 (0.1)	31.8 (−0.1)	17.3 (−8.2)	2.1 (−16.6)	−10.1 (−23.4)	−16.2 (−26.8)	−20.7 (−29.3)
Record low °F (°C)	−33 (−36)	−32 (−36)	−24 (−31)	−20 (−29)	−10 (−23)	10 (−12)	19 (−7)	18 (−8)	6 (−14)	−11 (−24)	−27 (−33)	−33 (−36)	−33 (−36)
Average precipitation inches (mm)	2.34 (59)	2.05 (52)	2.38 (60)	2.90 (74)	1.97 (50)	1.10 (28)	2.41 (61)	2.55 (65)	1.80 (46)	1.69 (43)	1.99 (51)	2.05 (52)	25.23 (641)
Average snowfall inches (cm)	44.5 (113)	40.5 (103)	42.5 (108)	46.6 (118)	18.9 (48)	2.4 (6.1)	0.2 (0.51)	0.1 (0.25)	4.2 (11)	22.4 (57)	33.9 (86)	38.5 (98)	294.7 (748.86)
Average extreme snow depth inches (cm)	42.1 (107)	51.3 (130)	57.1 (145)	56.9 (145)	43.4 (110)	6.3 (16)	0.2 (0.51)	0.0 (0.0)	2.8 (7.1)	9.9 (25)	19.2 (49)	30.6 (78)	61.1 (155)
Average precipitation days (≥ 0.01 in)	15.2	15.2	14.4	13.9	9.9	7.4	13.3	15.7	10.7	9.3	11.6	14.6	151.2
Average snowy days (≥ 0.1 in)	15.2	15.2	14.1	13.6	7.8	1.5	0.1	0.1	1.9	7.7	11.6	14.6	103.4
Source 1: NOAA
Source 2: National Weather Service

== Gallery ==
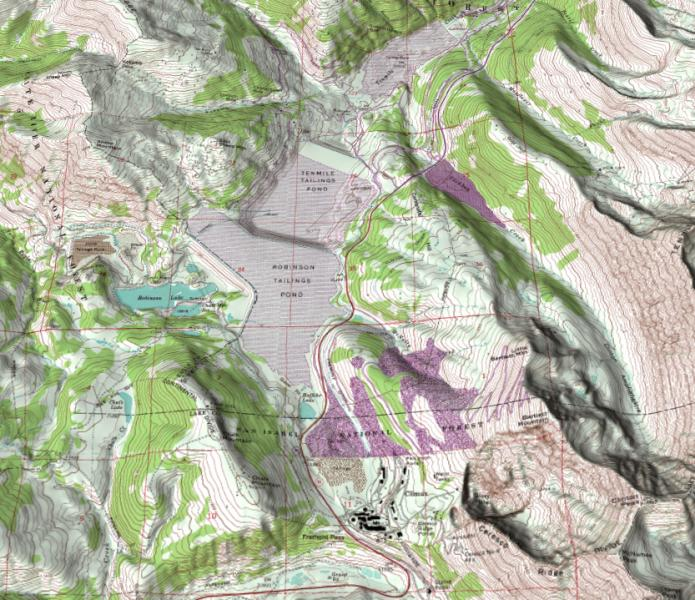
Climax, Colorado straddles the continental divide at Fremont Pass

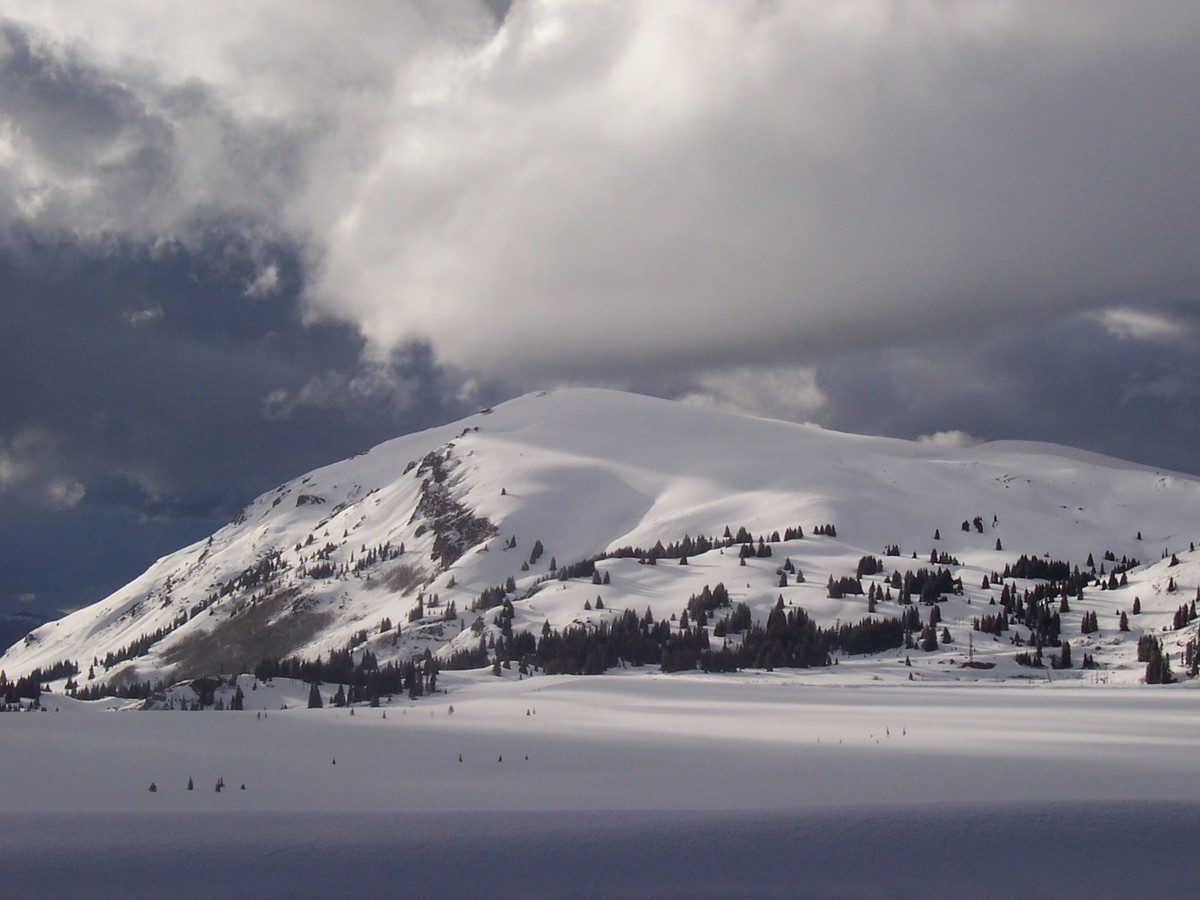
Storm over Sheep Mountain just north of Climax, 2005.

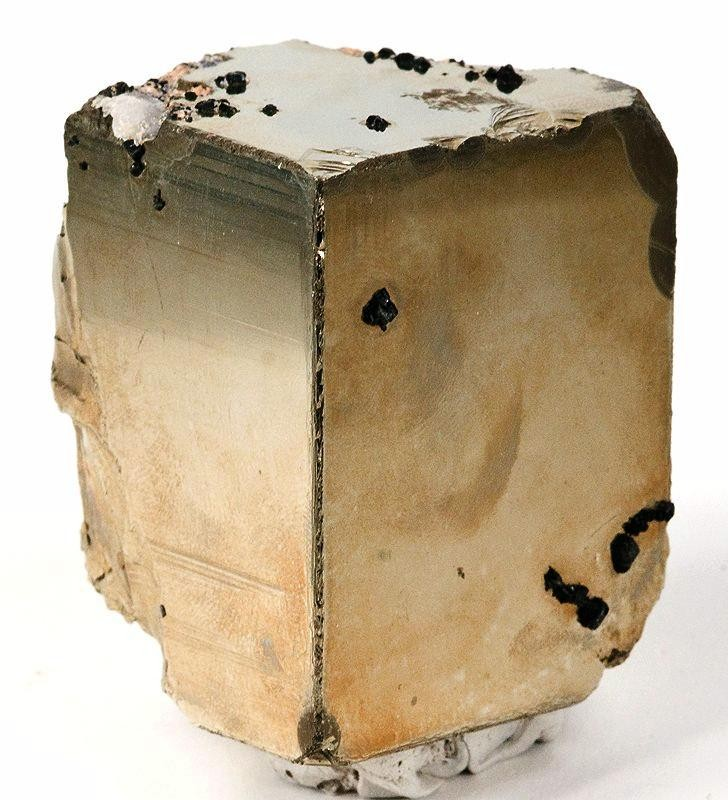
A rare pyrite-tetrahedrite mineral specimen from Climax

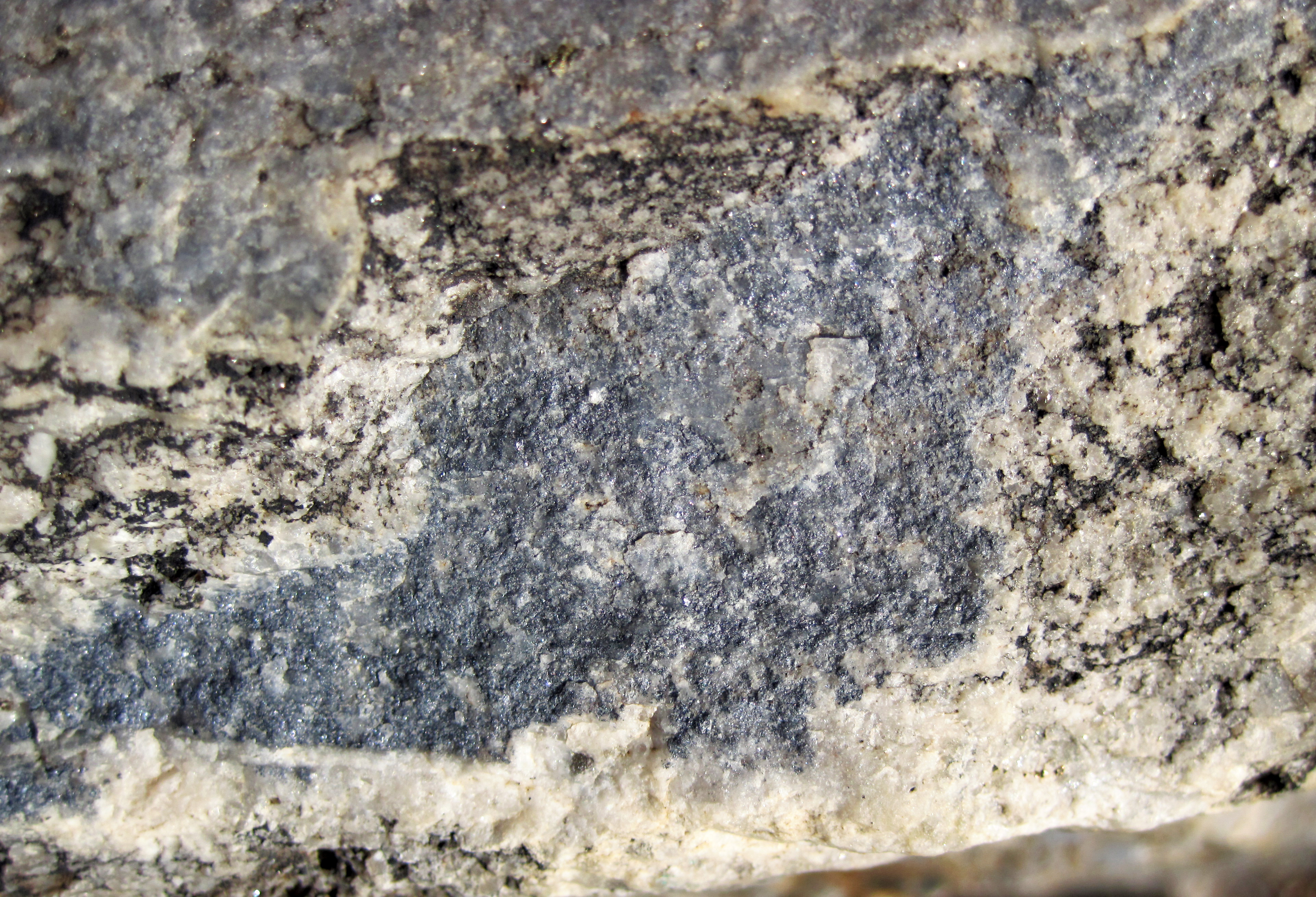
Climax Mine molybdenum ore - molybdenite vein in alkaline igneous host rock. The moly is dark silvery gray.

== See also ==
- Breckenridge, CO Micropolitan Statistical Area
- List of ghost towns in Colorado
