= Colorado State Highway 91 =

State highway in Colorado, United States

State Highway 91
- SH 91 highlighted in red

Route information
- Maintained by CDOT
- Length: 22.58 mi (36.34 km)

Major junctions
- South end: US 24 at Leadville
- North end: I-70 at Copper Mountain

Location
- Country: United States
- State: Colorado
- Counties: Lake, Summit

Highway system
- Colorado State Highway System; Interstate; US; State; Scenic
← SH 90	→ SH 92

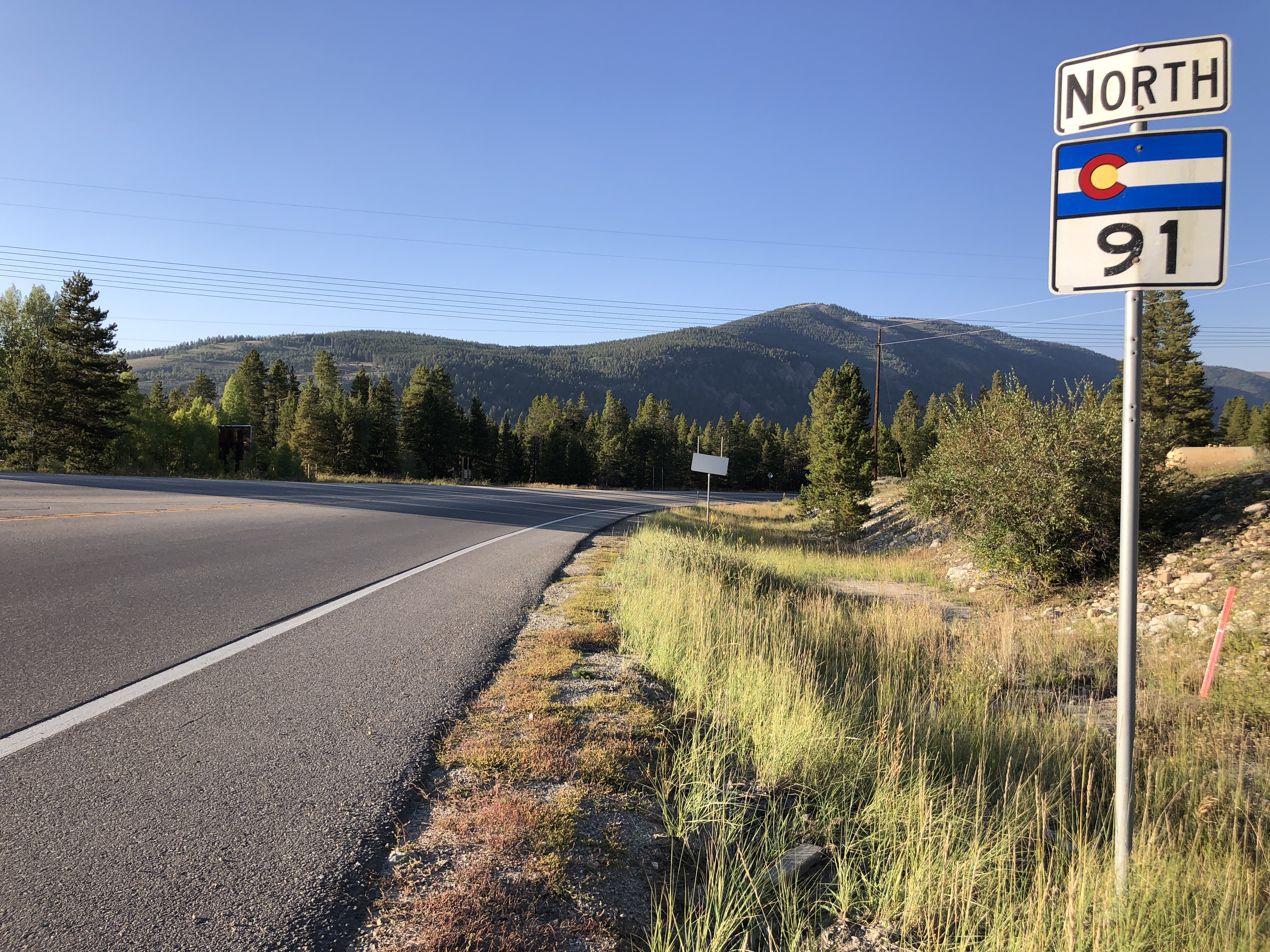
SH 91 northbound just north of Leadville.

State Highway 91 (SH 91) is a 22.58-mile-long (36.34 km) stretch of state highway in the U.S. state of Colorado. SH 91's southern terminus is at U.S. Route 24 (US 24) in Leadville, and the northern terminus is at Interstate 70 (I-70) at Copper Mountain.

== Route description ==
SH 91 begins at an intersection with US 24 in Leadville. It travels to the northeast over Fremont Pass, passing the ghost town of Climax, home of the recently reopened Climax mine.

SH 91 ends at an interchange with I-70 at Wheeler Junction. Since the development of the Copper Mountain Ski Resort area, Wheeler Junction is more commonly referred to as Copper Mountain.

== History ==
As constructed in the 1920s, State Highway 91 went from Leadville, via Climax, Fremont Pass, Frisco, and Loveland Pass, to Empire, where it joined US 40. The segment from Leadville to Climax was paved by 1936, and the entire route was paved by 1954. In 1938, route 91 became US 6, until US 6 was rerouted over Vail Pass in 1941, leaving the portion of route 91 from Copper Mountain (formerly Wheeler Junction) to Leadville as the surviving part of this historic highway.

== Major intersections ==
County	Location	mi	km	Destinations	Notes
Lake		0.000	0.000	US 24 – Leadville, Minturn	Southern terminus
Summit		22.605	36.379	I-70 – Grand Junction, Denver	Northern terminus; I-70 exit 195; interchange
1.000 mi = 1.609 km; 1.000 km = 0.621 mi
