= Preston, Colorado =

Ghost town in Summit County, Colorado

Preston
- Mining ghost town
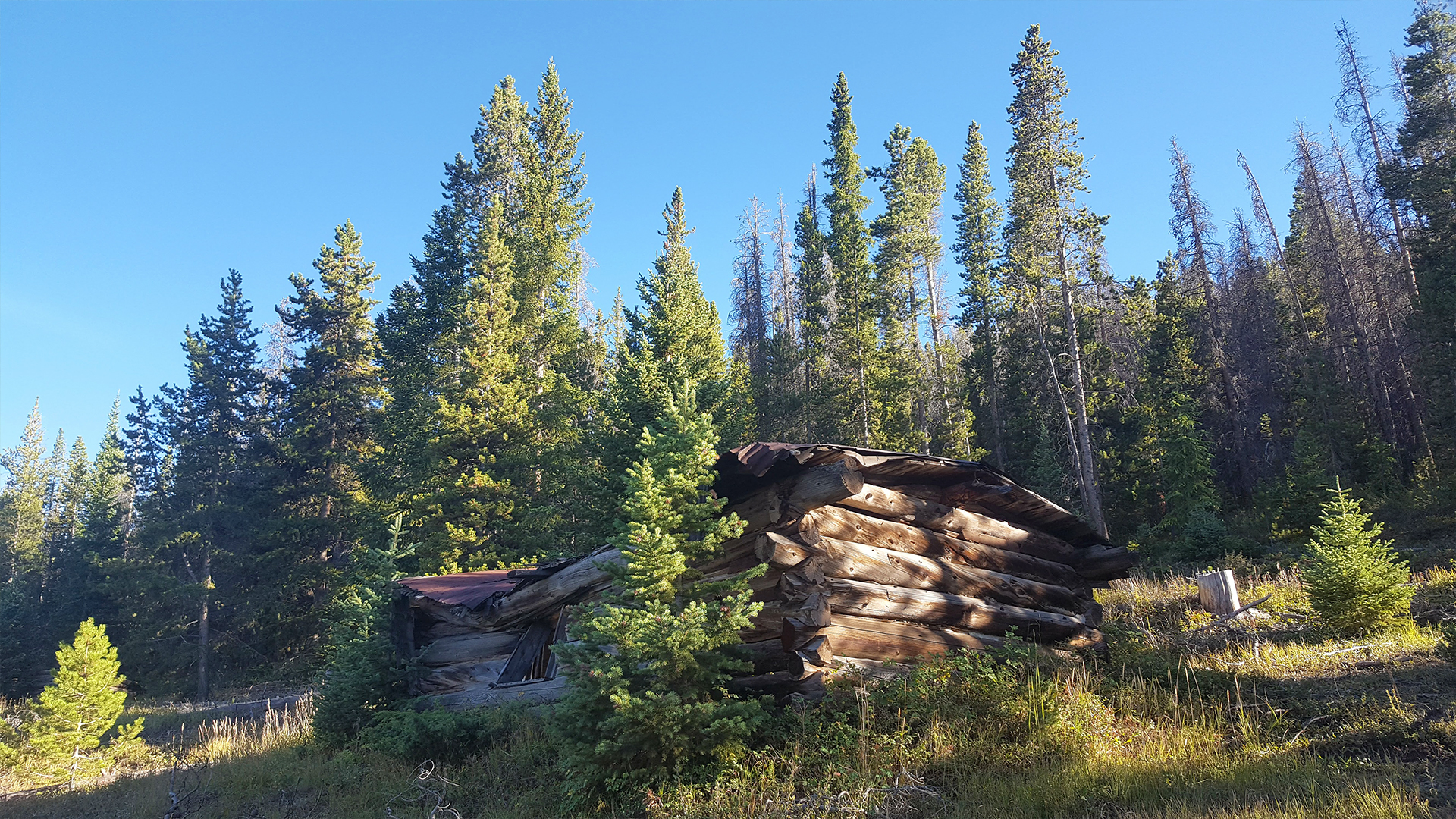
- An abandoned cabin at Preston in 2020

- Location within the state of Colorado
- Coordinates: 39°29′45″N 106°01′16″W
- Country: United States
- State: Colorado
- County: Summit
- Elevation: 10,371 ft (3,161 m)

Population (2010)
  - Total: 0
- Time zone: UTC-7 (Mountain (MST))
  - Summer (DST): UTC-6 (MDT)
- ZIP Codes: 80424
- GNIS feature ID: 203917

Preston is a ghost town in Summit County, Colorado. It is located east of modern Breckenridge, between Jessie mine in Gold Run Gulch and the Jumbo mine.

== Description ==
Preston is situated above Gold Run Gulch along Dry Gulch Road. The townsite is now National Forest property and is managed by the Breckenridge Heritage Alliance. About 375 feet (114 m) west of the townsite are the remains of the Jumbo mine–consisting of abandoned minecarts, several mounds of tailings, and a few largely collapsed wooden structures. The remaining Preston town structures are scattered along a short stretch of road. The Jessie mine is located roughly 444 feet (135 m) below Preston and is connected by the road. There is another, unrelated mine named "Jumbo" that operated in the 1910s–roughly 30 years after the opening of the Preston Jumbo mine–near Montezuma several miles to the northeast.

In the summer, the town is accessible by bike, car, and foot. In the winter can be reached by cross-country skis, snowshoes, and fatbike. There are several meadows that provide views of Breckenridge, Frisco, and the Dillon Reservoir. The residential area was part of a connected series of populated mining sites that also included the Prospect Complex to the northeast. A sign for visitors to the Preston townsite displays historic photographs and information, as does a similar sign at the Jessie mine.

== History ==
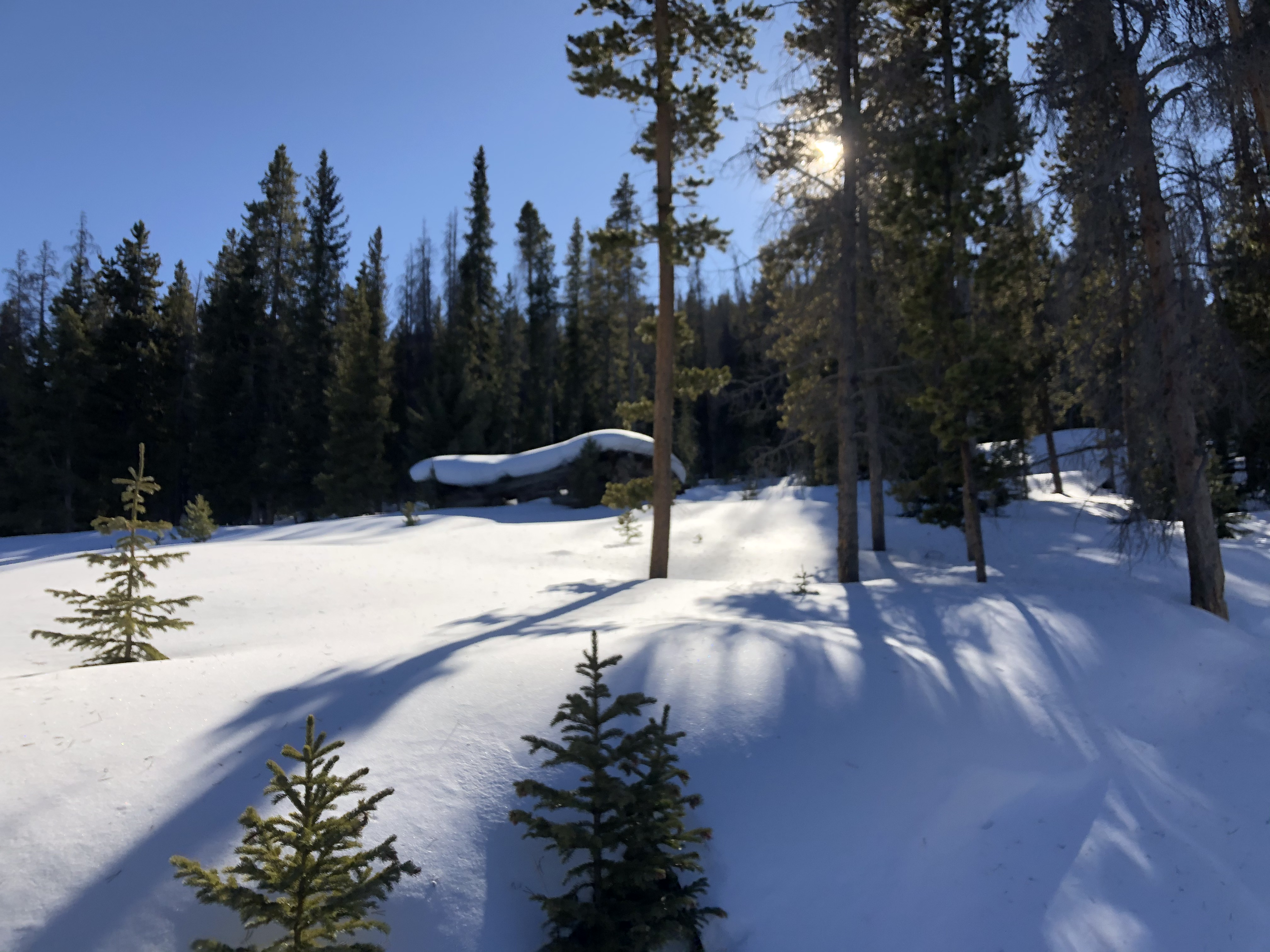
Abandoned cabin in Preston during the winter.

The town existed by at least 1875, when the first post office was moved there from the nearby Delaware Flats. The post office was briefly closed in January 1884, reopening after a month, before its 1889 move back towards Delaware Flats to the town of Braddockville, where in 1881 there had been an ore discovery.

In 1893–1894, the Jessie mine was constructed to extract gold, silver, zinc, and lead. At its peak, the town was home to roughly 150 miners and their families, as well as a millinery and boarding house. It was depopulated completely by the late 1930s.
