= Blue River, Colorado =

Statutory town in Summit County, Colorado, United States

- Statutory town
- Town of Blue River
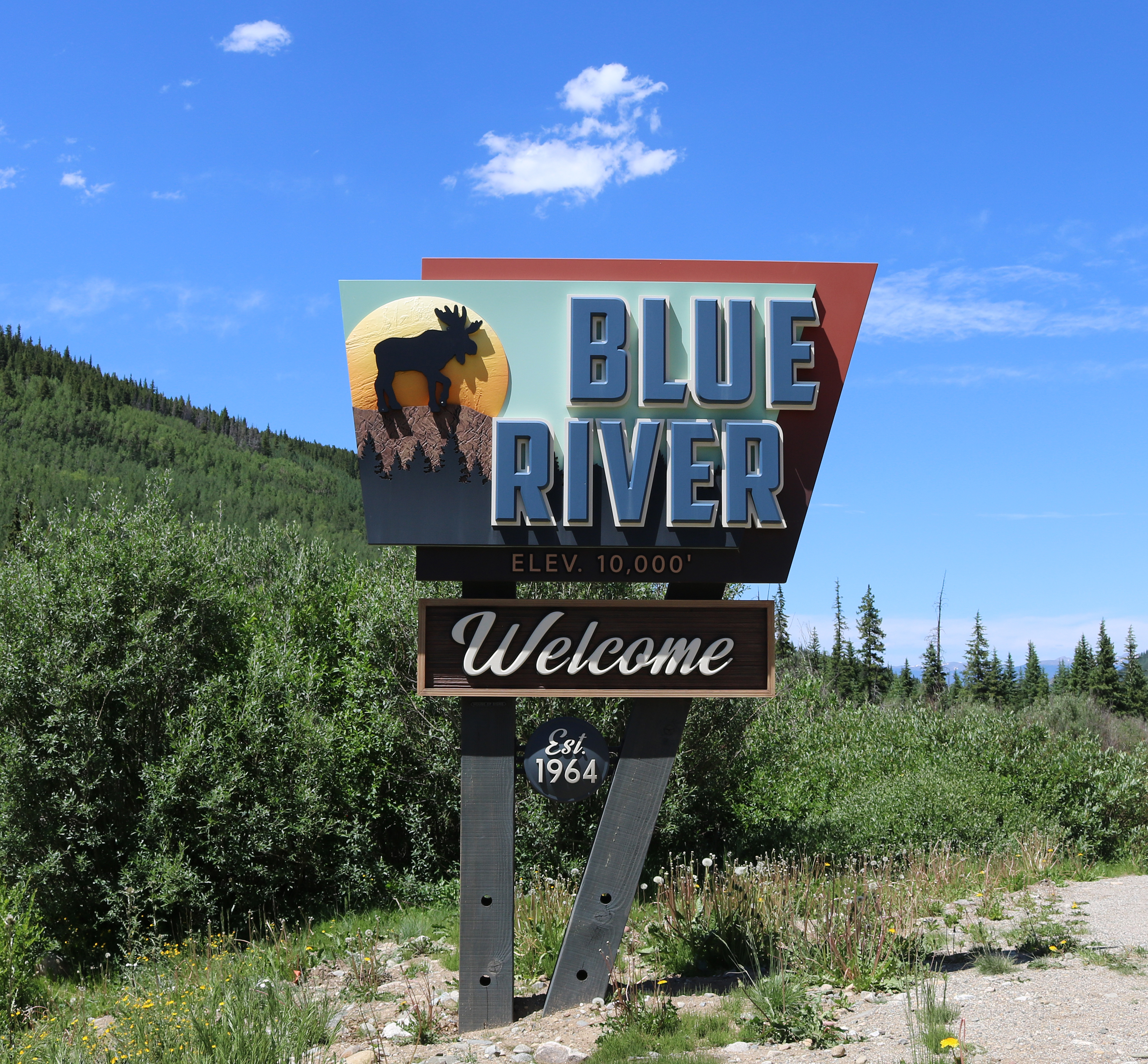
- Welcome sign along Highway 9

- Location of the Town of Blue River in Summit County, Colorado
- Coordinates: 39°26′17″N 106°02′24″W
- Country: United States
- State: Colorado
- County: Summit
- Incorporated: 1964

Government
  - Type: statutory town

Area
  - Total: 2.563 sq mi (6.637 km^{2})
  - Land: 2.463 sq mi (6.379 km^{2})
  - Water: 0.100 sq mi (0.258 km^{2})
- Elevation: 9,958 ft (3,035 m)

Population (2020)
  - Total: 877
  - Density: 356/sq mi (137/km^{2})
- Time zone: UTC−07:00 (MST)
  - Summer (DST): UTC−06:00 (MDT)
- ZIP code: 80424
- Area code: 970
- GNIS town ID: 2411700
- FIPS code: 08-07410
- Website: townofblueriver.colorado.gov

Blue River is a statutory town located along the Blue River in Summit County, Colorado, United States. The town population was 877 at the 2020 United States census. The town is located in the Blue River Valley along Colorado State Highway 9.

== History ==
The Town of Blue River was incorporated in 1964. Blue River postal addresses are served by the Breckenridge, Colorado post office (ZIP code 80424).

== Geography ==
At the 2020 United States census, the town had a total area of 1,640 acres (6.637 km^{2}) including 64 acres (0.258 km^{2}) of water.

== Demographics ==
Historical population
Census	Pop.	Note	%±
1970	8		—
1980	230		2,775.0%
1990	440		91.3%
2000	685		55.7%
2010	849		23.9%
2020	877		3.3%
U.S. Decennial Census

The town is part of Breckenridge, CO Micropolitan Statistical Area.

As of the census of 2000, there were 685 people, 268 households, and 151 families residing in the town. The population density was 314.0 inhabitants per square mile (121.2/km^{2}). There were 563 housing units at an average density of 258.0 per square mile (99.6/km^{2}). The racial makeup of the town was 98.39% White, 0.15% Asian, 0.44% from other races, and 1.02% from two or more races. Hispanic or Latino of any race were 2.04% of the population.

There were 268 households, out of which 26.1% had children under the age of 18 living with them, 53.7% were married couples living together, 1.1% had a female householder with no husband present, and 43.3% were non-families. 16.8% of all households were made up of individuals, and 1.9% had someone living alone who was 65 years of age or older. The average household size was 2.56 and the average family size was 2.82.

In the town, the population was spread out, with 17.4% under the age of 18, 11.4% from 18 to 24, 46.9% from 25 to 44, 21.8% from 45 to 64, and 2.6% who were 65 years of age or older. The median age was 32 years. For every 100 females, there were 122.4 males. For every 100 females age 18 and over, there were 126.4 males.

The median income for a household in the town was $61,964, and the median income for a family was $70,714. Males had a median income of $34,844 versus $32,083 for females. The per capita income for the town was $28,411. About 2.8% of families and 7.0% of the population were below the poverty line, including 1.7% of those under age 18 and 21.4% of those age 65 or over.

== See also ==
- Breckenridge, CO Micropolitan Statistical Area
