= Kokomo Gulch =

Valley in Colorado, United States

Coordinates: 39°25′40″N 106°11′32″W

Kokomo Gulch is a valley in the U.S. state of Colorado.

A share of the first settlers at Kokomo Gulch being natives of Kokomo, Indiana caused the name to be selected.
