= Heeney, Colorado =

Census-designated place in Summit County, CO, USA

- Census-designated place
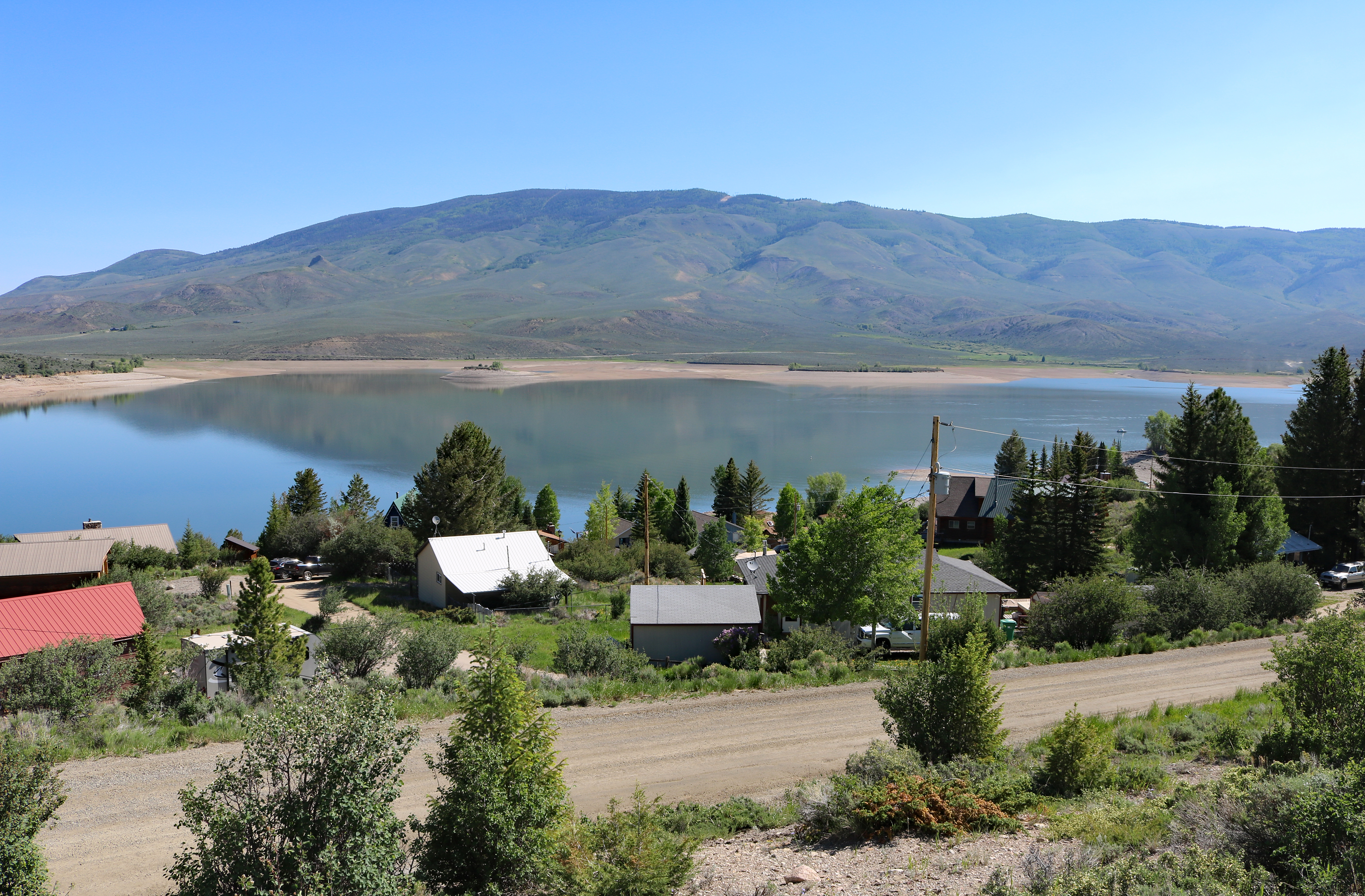
- Homes along the shore of Green Mountain Reservoir in Heeney.

- Location of the Heeney CDP in Summit County, Colorado
- Coordinates: 39°52′28″N 106°18′32″W
- Country: United States
- State: Colorado
- County: Summit County

Government
  - Type: Unincorporated community

Area
  - Total: 0.227 sq mi (0.589 km^{2})
  - Land: 0.227 sq mi (0.589 km^{2})
  - Water: 0 sq mi (0.000 km^{2})
- Elevation: 8,019 ft (2,444 m)

Population (2020)
  - Total: 74
  - Density: 330/sq mi (130/km^{2})
- Time zone: UTC-7 (MST)
  - Summer (DST): UTC-6 (MDT)
- ZIP Code: 80498
- Area code: 970
- GNIS feature ID: 2583244

Heeney is an unincorporated community and a census-designated place (CDP) located in and governed by Summit County, Colorado, United States. The CDP is a part of the Breckenridge, CO Micropolitan Statistical Area. The population of the Heeney CDP was 74 at the United States Census 2020. The Silverthorne post office (Zip Code 80498) serves Heeney postal addresses.

== History ==
The Heeney post office was established in 1939, and remained in operation until 1960. The community has the name of Paul Heeney (1894-1976), a local property owner.

== Geography ==
The Heeney CDP has an area of 146 acres (0.589 km^{2}), all land.

=== Climate ===
This climate type is dominated by the winter season, a long, bitterly cold period with short, clear days, relatively little precipitation mostly in the form of snow, and low humidity. According to the Köppen Climate Classification system, Heeney has a subarctic climate, abbreviated "Dfc" on climate maps.

== Demographics ==
The United States Census Bureau initially defined the Heeney CDP for the United States Census 2010.

Heeney CDP, Colorado
Year	Pop.	±%
2010	76	—
2020	74	−2.6%
Source: United States Census Bureau

== See also ==
- Silverthorne, CO Micropolitan Statistical Area
- Green Mountain Reservoir
- White River National Forest
