= Green Mountain Reservoir =

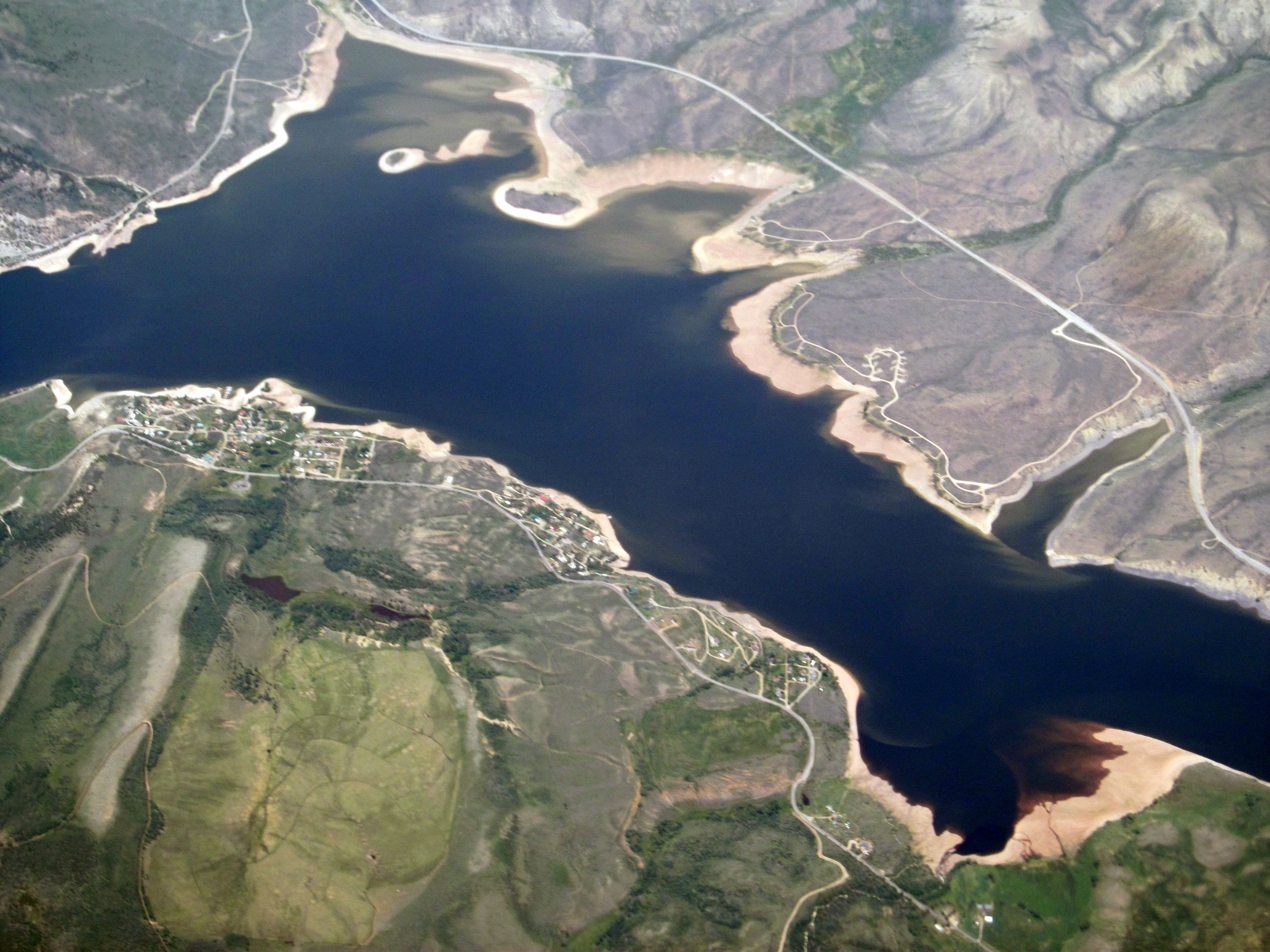
- Aerial view of the reservoir in 2017
- Location: Summit County, Colorado
- Coordinates: 39°52′39″N 106°19′50″W
- Construction began: 1938
- Opening date: 1942

Dam and spillways
- Impounds: Blue River
- Height: 309 ft (94 m)

Reservoir
- Creates: Green Mountain Reservoir
- Total capacity: 153,000 acre⋅ft (189,000,000 m^{3})
- Normal elevation: 7,950 ft (2,420 m)

Power Station
- Installed capacity: 25MW

Green Mountain Reservoir lies at the northern end of Summit County, Colorado along the Blue River. The Green Mountain Dam was built between 1938 and 1943 by the United States Bureau of Reclamation. The reservoir and its dam store water to benefit Colorado's Western Slope. Created by President Roosevelt as part of the Colorado-Big Thompson Project in 1937, Green Mountain was the first facility to be constructed. This is because it represents a great compromise that made the C-BT project possible: it compensates the Western Slope for water diverted to cities in Northern Colorado from Lake Granby further upstream on the Colorado River. Water from Green Mountain Dam is released either over the spillway, through the dam, or through the hydroelectric powerplant at the dam's base. The Green Mountain Power Plant has the capacity to generate up to 21,000 kilowatts, using two generators. Combined with the other five Federal power plants on the C-BT, enough electricity is produced annually to power almost 60,000 American homes.

The reservoir has a capacity of 153,000 acre-feet (189,000,000 m^{3}) of water. At maximum capacity, the elevation of the lake is 7,950 feet (2,420 m), and the dam is 309 feet (94 m) high. The lake is popular with anglers, who catch rainbow trout, lake trout, brown trout, and kokanee. State Highway 9 follows the east side of the lake. The town of Heeney lies on the western side, and the Green Mountain Reservoir Trail goes past the western side of the reservoir.

== Climate ==
Climate data for Green Mountain Dam, Colorado, 1991–2020 normals, 1939-2020 extremes: 7740ft (2359m)
Month	Jan	Feb	Mar	Apr	May	Jun	Jul	Aug	Sep	Oct	Nov	Dec	Year
Record high °F (°C)	60 (16)	58 (14)	67 (19)	77 (25)	86 (30)	95 (35)	97 (36)	93 (34)	95 (35)	84 (29)	67 (19)	62 (17)	97 (36)
Mean maximum °F (°C)	44.2 (6.8)	48.0 (8.9)	56.3 (13.5)	66.4 (19.1)	75.4 (24.1)	83.4 (28.6)	87.2 (30.7)	84.9 (29.4)	78.4 (25.8)	69.1 (20.6)	55.1 (12.8)	45.8 (7.7)	87.3 (30.7)
Mean daily maximum °F (°C)	27.8 (−2.3)	32.7 (0.4)	42.2 (5.7)	50.7 (10.4)	60.8 (16.0)	74.0 (23.3)	78.9 (26.1)	76.1 (24.5)	68.6 (20.3)	55.2 (12.9)	39.9 (4.4)	28.6 (−1.9)	53.0 (11.6)
Daily mean °F (°C)	15.7 (−9.1)	19.6 (−6.9)	28.5 (−1.9)	37.3 (2.9)	46.4 (8.0)	56.5 (13.6)	61.6 (16.4)	59.4 (15.2)	52.1 (11.2)	40.7 (4.8)	27.9 (−2.3)	17.5 (−8.1)	38.6 (3.7)
Mean daily minimum °F (°C)	3.7 (−15.7)	6.6 (−14.1)	14.9 (−9.5)	24.0 (−4.4)	31.9 (−0.1)	39.0 (3.9)	44.4 (6.9)	42.7 (5.9)	35.6 (2.0)	26.2 (−3.2)	15.9 (−8.9)	6.3 (−14.3)	24.3 (−4.3)
Mean minimum °F (°C)	−16.9 (−27.2)	−17.9 (−27.7)	−4.4 (−20.2)	9.9 (−12.3)	21.6 (−5.8)	30.2 (−1.0)	37.3 (2.9)	34.6 (1.4)	23.7 (−4.6)	13.9 (−10.1)	−1.0 (−18.3)	−11.6 (−24.2)	−21.6 (−29.8)
Record low °F (°C)	−41 (−41)	−46 (−43)	−26 (−32)	−11 (−24)	7 (−14)	21 (−6)	24 (−4)	24 (−4)	13 (−11)	1 (−17)	−17 (−27)	−26 (−32)	−46 (−43)
Average precipitation inches (mm)	1.13 (29)	1.06 (27)	1.21 (31)	1.95 (50)	1.66 (42)	1.06 (27)	1.57 (40)	1.63 (41)	1.46 (37)	1.40 (36)	1.05 (27)	1.28 (33)	16.46 (420)
Average snowfall inches (cm)	8.4 (21)	11.9 (30)	9.8 (25)	5.9 (15)	1.6 (4.1)	0.0 (0.0)	0.0 (0.0)	0.0 (0.0)	0.1 (0.25)	2.8 (7.1)	7.6 (19)	8.8 (22)	56.9 (143.45)
Source 1: NOAA (1981-2010 snowfall)
Source 2: XMACIS2 (records & 1981-2010 monthly max/mins)

== See also ==
- List of largest reservoirs of Colorado
