= Blue River (Colorado) =

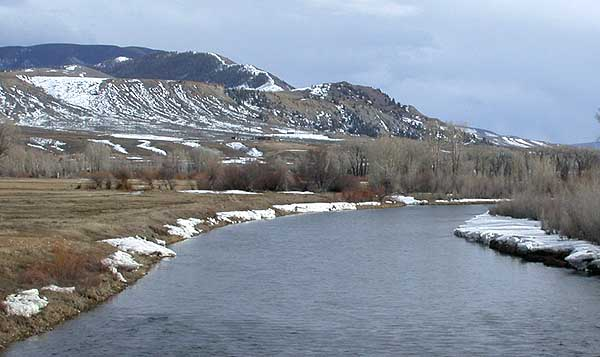
- The Blue River near Kremmling, Colorado

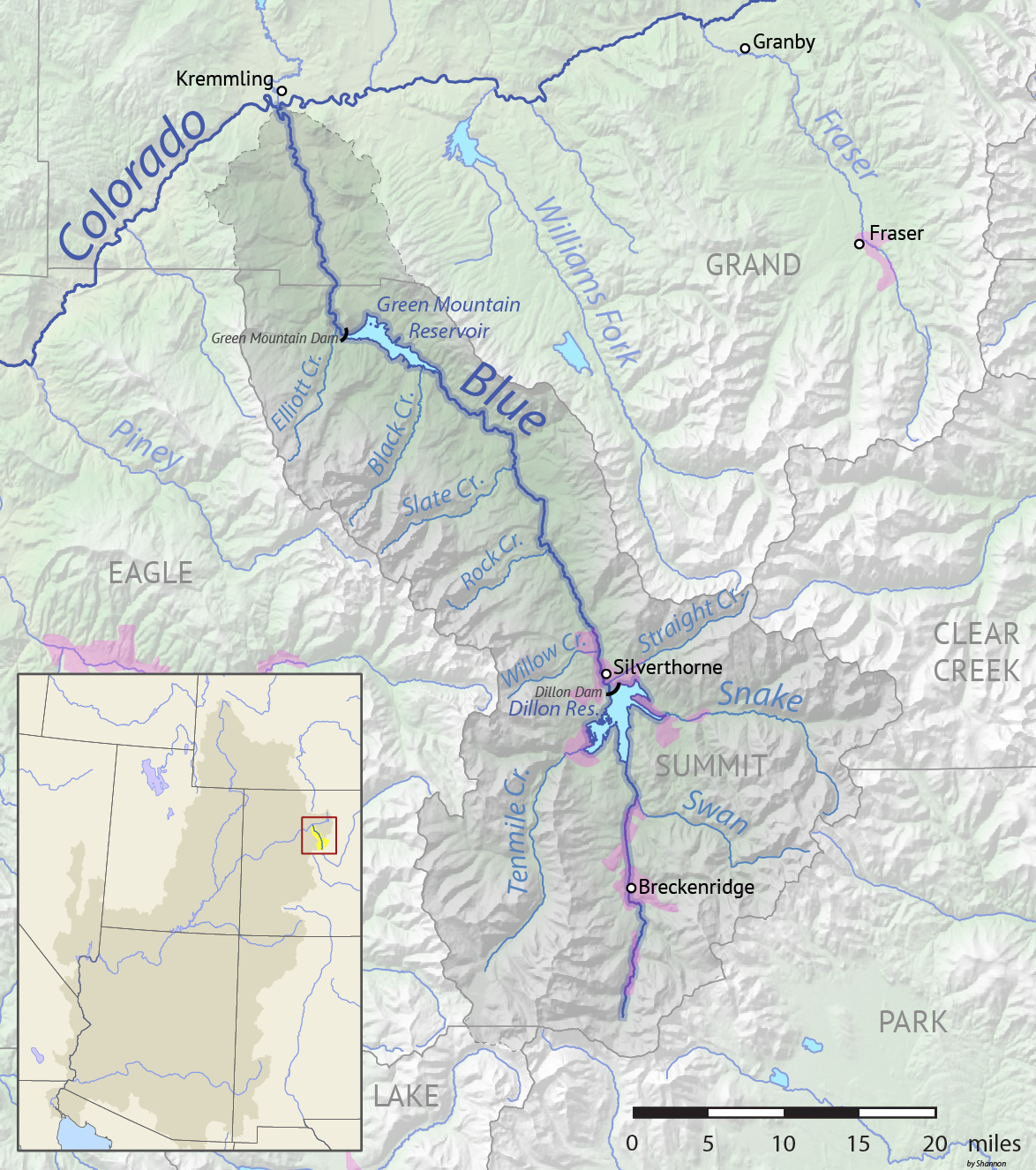
- Map of the Blue River drainage basin

Location
- Country: United States
- State: Colorado

Physical characteristics
- Source: Tenmile Range
  - location: Near Blue River, Summit County
  - coordinates: 39°23′27″N 106°01′12″W
  - elevation: 12,800 ft (3,900 m)
- Mouth: Colorado River
  - location: Kremmling, Grand County
  - coordinates: 40°02′33″N 106°23′48″W
  - elevation: 7,342 ft (2,238 m)
- Length: 65 mi (105 km)
- Basin size: 680 sq mi (1,800 km^{2})
- Discharge
  - location: 0.3 mi (0.48 km) below Green Mountain Dam
  - average: 447 cu ft/s (12.7 m^{3}/s)
  - minimum: 0 cu ft/s (0 m^{3}/s)
  - maximum: 4,040 cu ft/s (114 m^{3}/s)

Basin features
- Tributaries
  - right: Snake River

The Blue River is a tributary of the Colorado River, approximately 65 miles (105 km) long, in the U.S. state of Colorado.

It rises in southern Summit County, on the western side of the continental divide in the Ten Mile Range, near Quandary Peak. It flows northwards past Blue River and Breckenridge, then through the Dillon Reservoir near Dillon. The west portal for the "Roberts Tunnel" is at the base of Dillon Reservoir. The Roberts Tunnel is a trans-basin diversion, built by Denver Water in 1962, that diverts water under the Continental Divide from the Colorado River basin into the South Platte River Basin. The east portal is approximately one mile upstream of Grant, Colorado.

North of Dillon, the river flows north-northwest along the eastern slope of the Gore Range and joins the Colorado River at Kremmling.

The Green Mountain Dam, 13 miles (21 km) upstream from Kremmling, forms the Green Mountain Reservoir, providing hydroelectric power and diversionary water for irrigation, as part of the Colorado-Big Thompson Project. The dam is a project of the United States Bureau of Reclamation.

== See also ==
- List of rivers of Colorado
- List of tributaries of the Colorado River
