= Summit County, Colorado =

County in Colorado, United States

- County
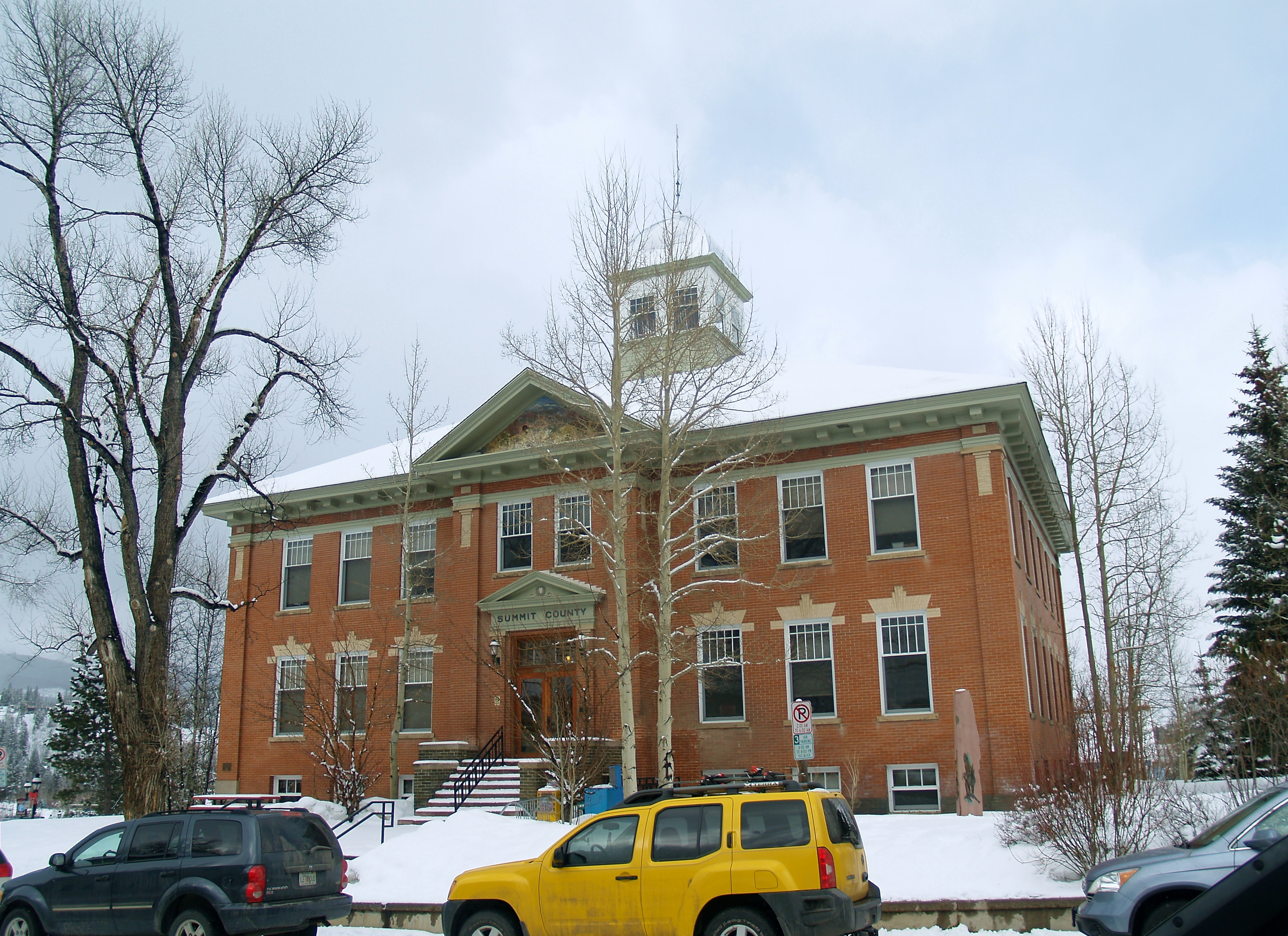
- The Summit County Courthouse in Breckenridge

- Seal

- Location within the U.S. state of Colorado
- Coordinates: 39.621023°N 106.137555°W
- Country: United States
- State: Colorado
- Founded: November 1, 1861
- Named for: Continental Divide
- Seat: Breckenridge
- Largest town: Silverthorne

Area
  - Total: 619.259 sq mi (1,603.87 km^{2})
  - Land: 608.328 sq mi (1,575.56 km^{2})
  - Water: 10.931 sq mi (28.31 km^{2}) 1.77%

Population (2020)
  - Total: 31,055
  - Estimate (2025): 31,517 ▲
  - Density: 51.050/sq mi (19.710/km^{2})
- Time zone: UTC−7 (Mountain)
  - Summer (DST): UTC−6 (MDT)
- Area code: 970 and 748
- Congressional district: 2nd
- Website: summitcountyco.gov

Summit County is a county located in the U.S. state of Colorado. As of the 2020 census, the population was 31,055, and was estimated to be 30,882 in 2024. The county seat is Breckenridge. Summit County comprises the Breckenridge, CO Micropolitan Statistical Area.

== History ==
Summit County was organized as one of the seventeen original Colorado counties by the First Territorial Legislature on November 1, 1861. It was named for the many mountain summits in the county. Until February 2, 1874, its boundaries included the area now comprising Summit County, Grand County, Routt County, Moffat County, Garfield County, Eagle County, and Rio Blanco County.

In 1874, the northern half of the original Summit County was split off to form Grand County; with the creation of Garfield and Eagle counties in 1883, Summit County arrived at its present boundaries. In addition, Summit County has seen two major boom eras.

== Geography ==
According to the United States Census Bureau, the county has a total area of 619.259 square miles (1,603.87 km^{2}), of which 608.328 square miles (1,575.56 km^{2}) is land and 10.931 square miles (28.31 km^{2}) (1.77%) is water. It is the 55th largest county in Colorado by total area.

The terrain of the county is mountainous with elevations ranging from 7,957 feet (2,425 m) at Green Mountain Reservoir to 14,270 feet (4,350 m) at Grays Peak. The elevation of the county seat of Breckenridge is 9,602 feet (2,927 m), making it one of the highest cities in the state of Colorado and the United States. Much of the county has an alpine climate (ET in the Köppen Classification) characterized by tundra vegetation. Breckenridge and other similar elevations in the county have a subarctic climate (Dfc) characterized by cool summers and abundant snowfall in winter.

=== Adjacent counties ===
- Grand County – north
- Clear Creek County – east
- Park County – southeast
- Lake County – southwest
- Eagle County – west

=== Major highways ===
- Interstate 70
- I-70 BL
- U.S. Highway 6
- State Highway 9
- State Highway 91

== Demographics ==
Historical population
Census	Pop.	Note	%±
1870	258		—
1880	5,459		2,015.9%
1890	1,906		−65.1%
1900	2,744		44.0%
1910	2,003		−27.0%
1920	1,724		−13.9%
1930	987		−42.7%
1940	1,754		77.7%
1950	1,135		−35.3%
1960	2,073		82.6%
1970	2,665		28.6%
1980	8,848		232.0%
1990	12,281		38.8%
2000	23,548		91.7%
2010	27,994		18.9%
2020	31,055		10.9%
2025 (est.)	31,517	▲	1.5%
U.S. Decennial Census; 1790–1960 1900–1990; 1990–2000 2010–2020

=== 2020 census ===
As of the 2020 census, the county had a population of 31,055. Of the residents, 16.8% were under the age of 18 and 13.0% were 65 years of age or older; the median age was 38.1 years. For every 100 females there were 119.5 males, and for every 100 females age 18 and over there were 120.7 males. 83.9% of residents lived in urban areas and 16.1% lived in rural areas.

Summit County, Colorado – Racial and ethnic composition Note: the US Census treats Hispanic/Latino as an ethnic category. This table excludes Latinos from the racial categories and assigns them to a separate category. Hispanics/Latinos may be of any race.
Race / Ethnicity (NH = Non-Hispanic)	Pop 2000	Pop 2010	Pop 2020	% 2000	% 2010	% 2020
White alone (NH)	20,411	23,158	23,782	86.68%	82.72%	76.58%
Black or African American alone (NH)	157	208	232	0.67%	0.74%	0.75%
Native American or Alaska Native alone (NH)	85	55	67	0.36%	0.20%	0.22%
Asian alone (NH)	201	269	407	0.85%	0.96%	1.31%
Pacific Islander alone (NH)	16	13	20	0.07%	0.05%	0.06%
Other race alone (NH)	18	31	150	0.08%	0.11%	0.48%
Mixed race or Multiracial (NH)	354	271	1,062	1.50%	0.97%	3.42%
Hispanic or Latino (any race)	2,306	3,989	5,335	9.79%	14.25%	17.18%
Total	23,548	27,994	31,055	100.00%	100.00%	100.00%

The racial makeup of the county was 79.7% White, 0.8% Black or African American, 0.8% American Indian and Alaska Native, 1.3% Asian, 0.1% Native Hawaiian and Pacific Islander, 8.8% from some other race, and 8.5% from two or more races. Hispanic or Latino residents of any race comprised 17.2% of the population.

There were 12,939 households in the county, of which 24.8% had children under the age of 18 living with them and 18.0% had a female householder with no spouse or partner present. About 26.5% of all households were made up of individuals and 6.6% had someone living alone who was 65 years of age or older.

There were 31,342 housing units, of which 58.7% were vacant. Among occupied housing units, 63.9% were owner-occupied and 36.1% were renter-occupied. The homeowner vacancy rate was 1.9% and the rental vacancy rate was 26.6%.

=== 2000 census ===
As of the 2000 census, there were 23,548 people, 9,120 households, and 4,769 families residing in the county. The population density was 39.0 inhabitants per square mile (15.1/km^{2}). There were 24,201 housing units at an average density of 40.0 per square mile (15.4/km^{2}). The racial makeup of the county was 91.84% White, 0.68% African American, 0.48% Native American, 0.87% Asian, 0.07% Pacific Islander, 3.96% from some other races and 2.10% from two or more races. Hispanic or Latino people of any race were 9.79% of the population.

There were 9,120 households, out of which 24.00% had children under the age of 18 living with them, 44.00% were married couples living together, 4.40% had a female householder with no husband present, and 47.70% were non-families. 21.60% of all households were made up of individuals, and 1.60% had someone living alone who was 65 years of age or older. The average household size was 2.48 and the average family size was 2.86.

In the county, the population was spread out, with 17.40% under the age of 18, 15.70% from 18 to 24, 44.30% from 25 to 44, 19.40% from 45 to 64, and 3.30% who were 65 years of age or older. The median age was 31 years. As of 2014, the life expectancy in Summit County was 86.83 years, the longest average life expectancy of any county in the United States. For every 100 females there were 139.00 males. For every 100 females age 18 and over, there were 144.90 males.

The median income for a household in the county was $56,587, and the median income for a family was $66,914 (these figures had risen to $65,281 and $80,441 respectively as of a 2007 estimate). Males had a median income of $33,741 versus $27,017 for females. The per capita income for the county was $28,676. About 3.10% of families and 9.00% of the population were below the poverty line, including 4.30% of those under age 18 and 3.40% of those age 65 or over.

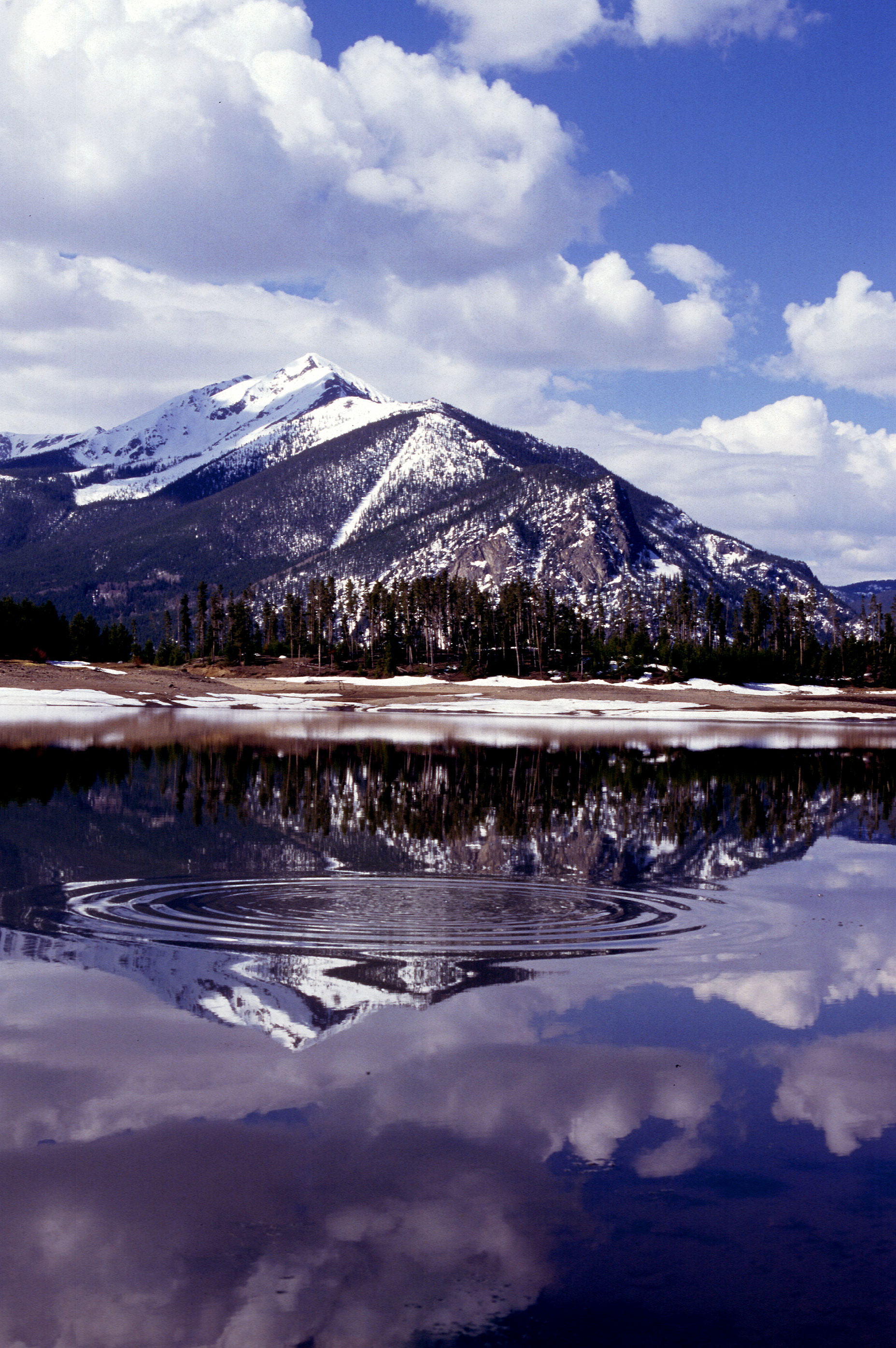
Snowmelt runoff fills Lake Dillon in Summit County

== Life expectancy ==
According to a report in the Journal of the American Medical Association, residents of Summit County had a 2014 life expectancy from birth of 86.83 years in 2014, the longest in the United States. Both men and women live longer in Summit County than in any other county in the United States: 85.5 years for men and 88.0 years for women is the life expectancy at birth. Two contiguous counties, Pitkin and Eagle Counties, rank numbers two and three in the nation in life expectancy. Factors contributing to the high life expectancy in Summit County are "high education, high income, high access to medical care, the people are physically active, obesity is lower than anywhere else — so you're doing it right," said Dr. Ali Mokdad, one of the study's co-authors.

== Education ==
=== K–12 schools ===
==== Elementary schools ====
- Breckenridge Elementary School
- Dillon Valley Elementary School (Dillon)
- Frisco Elementary School
- Silverthorne Elementary School
- Summit Cove Elementary School (Dillon)
- Upper Blue Elementary School (Breckenridge)

==== Middle school ====
- Summit Middle School (Frisco)

==== High schools ====
- Snowy Peaks Junior/Senior High School (Frisco)
- Summit High School (between Frisco and Breckenridge)

=== Higher education ===
- Colorado Mountain College operates campuses in Breckenridge and Dillon.

== Politics ==
Summit County is liberal in most elections, and has trended strongly toward the Democratic Party, like many other counties in Colorado dominated by ski towns. In 2020, Joe Biden's performance was the best by a Democrat since 1916, and Kamala Harris' performance was only slightly worse in 2024. From the 1950s through the 1980s, the county consistently leaned Republican, except in 1964.

United States presidential election results for Summit County, Colorado
Year	Republican		Democratic		Third party(ies)	
Year	No.	%	No.	%	No.	%
1880	1,289	48.81%	1,328	50.28%	24	0.91%
1884	609	51.92%	556	47.40%	8	0.68%
1888	701	55.63%	557	44.21%	2	0.16%
1892	279	25.60%	0	0.00%	811	74.40%
1896	28	2.20%	1,243	97.64%	2	0.16%
1900	394	28.59%	967	70.17%	17	1.23%
1904	561	48.15%	569	48.84%	35	3.00%
1908	366	31.99%	743	64.95%	35	3.06%
1912	179	18.55%	600	62.18%	186	19.27%
1916	268	26.27%	717	70.29%	35	3.43%
1920	418	50.36%	388	46.75%	24	2.89%
1924	354	47.52%	241	32.35%	150	20.13%
1928	362	53.16%	306	44.93%	13	1.91%
1932	224	34.78%	397	61.65%	23	3.57%
1936	268	34.85%	496	64.50%	5	0.65%
1940	479	46.78%	540	52.73%	5	0.49%
1944	326	57.60%	237	41.87%	3	0.53%
1948	292	43.26%	378	56.00%	5	0.74%
1952	442	61.90%	271	37.96%	1	0.14%
1956	429	64.61%	235	35.39%	0	0.00%
1960	424	51.27%	400	48.37%	3	0.36%
1964	344	41.55%	483	58.33%	1	0.12%
1968	536	57.39%	301	32.23%	97	10.39%
1972	1,082	59.03%	707	38.57%	44	2.40%
1976	1,826	58.15%	1,087	34.62%	227	7.23%
1980	2,027	46.54%	1,285	29.51%	1,043	23.95%
1984	3,253	66.14%	1,588	32.29%	77	1.57%
1988	2,893	51.44%	2,595	46.14%	136	2.42%
1992	2,256	26.95%	3,344	39.95%	2,770	33.09%
1996	3,261	38.73%	3,970	47.16%	1,188	14.11%
2000	4,497	40.63%	5,304	47.92%	1,267	11.45%
2004	5,370	39.10%	8,144	59.29%	221	1.61%
2008	4,883	32.77%	9,802	65.79%	214	1.44%
2012	5,571	36.38%	9,347	61.04%	394	2.57%
2016	5,100	31.53%	9,557	59.09%	1,517	9.38%
2020	5,322	28.80%	12,631	68.35%	526	2.85%
2024	5,244	29.89%	11,762	67.04%	539	3.07%

United States Senate election results for Summit County, Colorado2
Year	Republican		Democratic		Third party(ies)	
Year	No.	%	No.	%	No.	%
2020	5,817	31.60%	12,175	66.14%	415	2.25%

United States Senate election results for Summit County, Colorado3
Year	Republican		Democratic		Third party(ies)	
Year	No.	%	No.	%	No.	%
2022	4,211	29.57%	9,710	68.17%	322	2.26%

Colorado Gubernatorial election results for Summit County
Year	Republican		Democratic		Third party(ies)	
Year	No.	%	No.	%	No.	%
2022	3,650	25.57%	10,383	72.73%	243	1.70%

== Communities ==
=== Towns ===
- Blue River
- Breckenridge
- Dillon
- Frisco
- Keystone
- Montezuma
- Silverthorne

=== Census-designated places ===
- Copper Mountain
- Heeney

=== Ghost towns ===
- Dyersville
- Kokomo
- Parkville
- Preston
- Saints John
- Tiger

== Recreation ==
=== National protected areas ===
- White River National Forest
- Eagles Nest Wilderness

=== Ski areas ===
- Arapahoe Basin
- Breckenridge
- Copper Mountain
- Keystone

=== Trails and byways ===
- American Discovery Trail
- Colorado Trail
- Continental Divide National Scenic Trail
- Great Parks Bicycle Route
- Top of the Rockies National Scenic Byway
- TransAmerica Trail Bicycle Route
- Vail Pass National Recreation Trail
- Wheeler Ten Mile National Recreation Trail

=== Lakes ===
The county has three reservoirs, Lake Dillon, Green Mountain Reservoir, and Clinton Gulch Dam Reservoir that are also popular recreation sites.

=== Islands ===
- Silver Dollar Island

=== Concert venues ===
- Dillon Amphitheater

== See also ==
- Bibliography of Colorado
- Geography of Colorado
- History of Colorado
  - National Register of Historic Places listings in Summit County, Colorado
- Index of Colorado-related articles
- List of Colorado-related lists
  - List of counties in Colorado
  - List of statistical areas in Colorado
- Outline of Colorado
