= Erie (disambiguation) =

Erie is a city in Pennsylvania, United States.

Erie may also refer to:

== Places ==
=== Canada ===
- Erie (electoral district), a former federal electoral district in Ontario
- Erie (provincial electoral district), a former provincial electoral district in Ontario
- Fort Erie, a former British fort
  - Fort Erie, Ontario, a town on the Niagara River in the Niagara Region
  - Fort Erie Airport

=== United States ===
- Erie, Alabama, a ghost town
- Erie, Colorado, a town in both Boulder County and Weld County
- Erie, Illinois, a village in Whiteside County
- Erie, Lawrence County, Indiana
- Erie, Miami County, Indiana
- Erie, Kansas, a city in Neosho County
- Erie, Michigan, an unincorporated community
- Erie, Missouri, an unincorporated community
- Erie, North Dakota, an unincorporated community and census-designated place (CDP) in Cass County
- Erie Airport (disambiguation)
- Erie County (disambiguation)
- Erie Falls, a waterfall in Ricketts Glen State Park, Luzerne County, Pennsylvania
- Erie National Wildlife Refuge, a property in Crawford County, Pennsylvania
- Erie Township (disambiguation)
- Mount Erie (disambiguation)
- Roman Catholic Diocese of Erie, a diocese in Pennsylvania

=== Other places ===
- Erie Canal, a canal running from the Hudson River to Lake Erie
- Lake Erie (disambiguation)

== Organizations ==
- Erie Railroad, a railroad connecting New York City with Lake Erie and extending west to Chicago
- Erie Insurance Group, a multi-line insurance company, offering auto, home, commercial and life insurance

== Vehicles ==
- Erie L-1, 0-8-8-0 steam locomotives of the Erie Railroad built in 1907 by ALCO
- FM Erie-built, the first streamlined, cab-equipped dual service diesel locomotive built by Fairbanks-Morse
- Erie (steamship, sank 1841), a steam-powered Great Lakes passenger freighter which caught fire and sank in 1841.
- USS Erie (1813), a sloop-of-war in the United States Navy in the early 19th century
- USS Erie (PG-50), the lead ship in a class of two Patrol Gunboats, launched in 1936

== Sport ==
- Erie Blades, two former professional ice hockey teams in Erie, Pennsylvania
- Erie Freeze, a charter member of the American Indoor Football Association, team located in Erie, Pennsylvania
- Erie Illusion, a women's football team playing in the National Women's Football Association, based in Erie, Pennsylvania
- Erie Invaders, a 2000 expansion team of the defunct Indoor Football League from Erie, Pennsylvania
- Erie Otters, a junior ice hockey team in the Ontario Hockey League, playing in Erie, Pennsylvania, USA from 1996 to present
- Erie Panthers, a former professional hockey team in the East Coast Hockey League from 1988 to 1996
- Erie Sailors, several minor league baseball teams that played in Erie, Pennsylvania between 1906 and 1994
- Erie SeaWolves, a minor league baseball team based in Erie, Pennsylvania, playing in the Eastern League

== Other ==
- Erie (tribe), a tribe of Native Americans
- Edward Erie Poor (1837–1900), American banker
- Erie (film), a 2010 film by Kevin Jerome Everson
- The Erie doctrine, a legal doctrine in the United States

== See also ==
- Erie High School (disambiguation)
- Erie Railroad Station (disambiguation)
- Eerie (disambiguation)
- Éire, meaning "Ireland" in the Irish language
