= The Spider (Colorado) =

Mountain in Colorado, United States

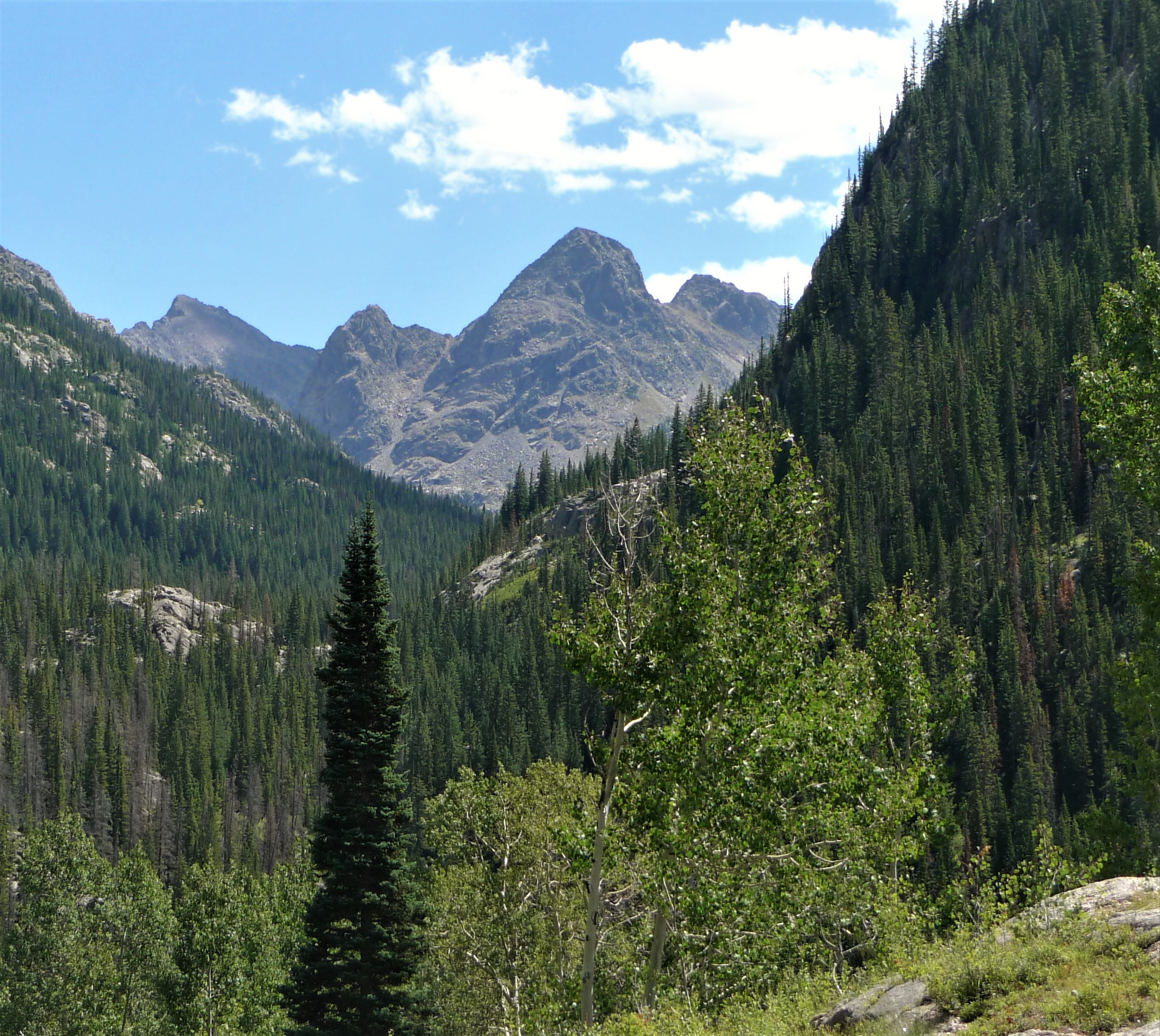
- Northwest aspect centered in the distance

Highest point
- Elevation: 12,695 ft (3,869 m)
- Prominence: 638 ft (194 m)
- Parent peak: Mount Powell (13,586 ft)
- Isolation: 1.07 mi (1.72 km)
- Coordinates: 39°42′33″N 106°18′46″W

Geography
- Location within Colorado Location within the United States
- Country: United States
- State: Colorado
- County: Eagle County
- Protected area: Eagles Nest Wilderness
- Parent range: Rocky Mountains; Gore Range
- Topo map: USGS Vail East

Climbing
- Easiest route: class 3 via South ridge

The Spider is a 12,695-foot (3,869 m) mountain summit in Eagle County, Colorado, United States.

== Description ==
The Spider is set in the Gore Range which is a subrange of the Rocky Mountains. The mountain is located six miles (9.7 km) northeast of the community of Vail in the Eagles Nest Wilderness on land managed by White River National Forest. It ranks as the seventh-highest peak in the Gore Range as well as the wilderness. Precipitation runoff from the mountain's slopes drains into headwaters of the Piney River. Topographic relief is significant as the summit rises 2,100 feet (640 m) above the river in 0.7 mile (1.1 km). The mountain's toponym has been officially adopted by the United States Board on Geographic Names.

== Climate ==
According to the Köppen climate classification system, The Spider is located in an alpine subarctic climate zone with cold, snowy winters, and cool to warm summers. Due to its altitude, it receives precipitation all year, as snow in winter, and as thunderstorms in summer, with a dry period in late spring.

== See also ==
- List of mountain peaks of Colorado
