= Eagle's Nest =

Eagle's Nest, The Eagle's Nest, Eagle Nest, Eagles Nest or Eaglenest may refer to a bird nest for eagles.

The terms may also refer to:

== Geography ==
=== Canada ===
- Eaglenest Range, a mountain range in British Columbia, Canada
- Eagle's Nest Park, a park and scenic outlook in Bancroft, Ontario, Canada

=== Germany ===
- Adlerhorst ("Eagle's Nest"), Hitler's command complex near Bad Nauheim, Hesse, Germany
- Kehlsteinhaus, known in English-speaking countries as the Eagle's Nest, an alpine retreat atop the Hoher Gohl built by the Nazi party near Berchtesgaden in the German Alps

=== Ireland ===
- Eagle's Nest, County Donegal, a townland in Inver, County Donegal, Ireland
- Eagle's Nest, Kerry, a corrie containing Ireland's highest lake at the north-east face of Ireland's highest mountain, Carrauntoohil

=== Poland ===
- Eagle Nests Landscape Park, a protected area in Poland
- Eagle Nests Trail, a tourist trail in Poland

=== United Kingdom ===
- Eagle's Nest, a viewpoint at the Wyndcliff, Monmouthshire, Wales
- Eagles Nest, the house in Zennor, Cornwall where the artist Patrick Heron lived

=== United States ===
- Eagle's Nest Arena, venue of the 1984 Summer Olympics, Los Angeles, California
- The Eagle's Nest, the name of Cabot Yerxa's first home in Desert Hot Springs, California
- Eaglenest, California or Rio Nido, a community
- Eagles Nest Wilderness, a U.S. Wilderness located in the Gore Range of Eagle and Summit Counties, Colorado
- Eagles Nest (Colorado), a mountain in Eagles Nest Wilderness
- Eagle's Nest (Bridgeport, Connecticut), historic home
- Eagle's Nest (sinkhole), an underwater cave in Chassahowitzka Wildlife Management Area, Florida
- Eagles' Nest (Robert Morris–Springfield), softball park in Springfield, Illinois
- Eagle's Nest (Phoenix, Maryland), a historic home
- Eagle Nest, Michigan, an unincorporated community
- Eagles Nest Township, St. Louis County, Minnesota, a township in northeast Minnesota
- Eagle Nest, New Mexico, a village in Colfax County, New Mexico
- Eagle Nest camp, an Adirondack Great Camp on Eagle Lake in Blue Mountain Lake, New York
- Eagle's Nest, William K. Vanderbilt II's estate in Suffolk County, New York, now the Vanderbilt Museum
- Eagle Nest (Pink Hills, North Carolina), historic home
- North Eaglenest Mountain in Haywood County, North Carolina
- Eaglenest Entertainment Center, an attraction in Maggie Valley, North Carolina
- Eaglenest Mountain in Haywood County, North Carolina
- Eagle Nest Canyon or Mile Canyon, a canyon on the Rio Grande near Langtry, Texas
- Eagle's Nest (Ambar, Virginia), historic home
- Eagle's Nest Airport (Virginia), a private airport near Waynesboro, Virginia, United States

=== Elsewhere ===
- Eagle's Nest (Hong Kong), a hill in Hong Kong
- Eaglenest Wildlife Sanctuary in India
- Alamut Castle, Alamut in Persian: الموت ("Eagle's Nest"), a mountain fortress located in the Alamut region of Iran
- Fort Stražnik, a fortress in Montenegro, also known as Eagle's Nest
- Eagles Nest, New Zealand, a complex of rental villas in the Bay of Islands, New Zealand

== Arts, entertainment, and media ==
- The Eagle's Nest (painting), an 1833 oil painting by Edwin Landseer
- "The Eagle's Nest", an episode of The New Avengers

== See also ==
- Aerie (disambiguation)
- Eagle (disambiguation)
- Eyrie (disambiguation)
- Nest (disambiguation)
