= Meridian Peak =

Mountain in the American state of Colorado

- Location within Colorado

Highest point
- Elevation: 12,432 ft (3,789 m)
- Prominence: 366 ft (112 m)
- Isolation: 1.93 mi (3.11 km)
- Coordinates: 39°46′03″N 106°23′06″W

Geography
- Location: Eagle and Summit counties, Colorado, United States
- Parent range: Gore Range
- Topo map(s): USGS 7.5' topographic map Piney Peak, Colorado

Climbing
- Easiest route: hike

Meridian Peak is a mountain summit in the Gore Range of the Rocky Mountains of North America. The 12,432-foot (3,789 m) peak is located in the Eagles Nest Wilderness, 9.0 miles (14.5 km) north by west (bearing 353°) of the town of Vail, Colorado, United States, on the drainage divide separating White River National Forest and Eagle County from Arapaho National Forest and Summit County.

== Hiking ==
Meridian Peak lies at the southern end of Elliot Ridge Trail. It can be reached by ascending several hiking trails into the Gore Range. Surprise Lake Trail goes south for 2.6 miles to Surprise Lake, then the Gore Range Trail continues west for 1.9 miles to a junction with the Upper Cataract Lake and Mirror Lake Trail. Mirror Lake is 6.5 miles beyond the junction, at an elevation of 10,560 feet. The Elliot Ridge Trail is 3.2 miles from Mirror Lake. The summit of Meridian Peak is another 1.2 south from the junction with the Elliot Ridge Trail.

== See also ==
- List of Colorado mountain ranges
- List of Colorado mountain summits
  - List of Colorado fourteeners
  - List of Colorado 4000 meter prominent summits
  - List of the most prominent summits of Colorado
- List of Colorado county high points
