= Eerie =

Eerie may refer to:

- Feeling of creepiness
- Eerie (magazine), an American horror comic first published in 1966
- Eerie (Avon), a 1947 horror comic
- Eerie (film), a 2018 Filipino horror film
- Eerie Publications, a publisher of comics magazines
- Eerie, Indiana, a 1991–92 television series
  - Eerie, Indiana: The Other Dimension, a 1998 spin-off television series
- The Eeries, a U.S. rock band
- Christina Von Eerie (born 1989), U.S. professional wrestler
- Battle of Hill Eerie, several Korean War battles

== See also ==
- Erie (disambiguation)
- Eyrie (disambiguation)
- Aerie (disambiguation)
