= Eire (disambiguation) =

Éire is an Irish-language word that means "Ireland".

Eire can also refer to:

- Carlos Eire, historian at Yale University
- Eire Balkar, fictional queen of Torivia in the Japanese web manga Centuria
- "Eire", song by Thin Lizzy from the 1971 debut self-titled studio album Thin Lizzy

== See also ==
- Erie (disambiguation)
