= Eagle House =

Eagle House may refer to:

in England

- Eagle House, Mitcham, London
- Eagle House, Wimbledon, London
- Eagle House School, near Sandhurst, Berkshire
- Eagle House (suffragette's rest) – house in Somerset which was a base for the suffragettes

in the Philippines

- Celso Ledesma House, also known as Eagle House – heritage house in Iloilo City

in the United States

- Eagle House (Lonoke, Arkansas), listed on the NRHP in Arkansas
- Eagles Home, Evansville, IN, listed on the NRHP in Indiana
- Eagle Mountain House, Jackson, NH, listed on the NRHP in New Hampshire

== See also ==
- Eagle's Nest (disambiguation)
