= Erie County =

Erie County is the name of three counties in the United States:

- Erie County, New York
- Erie County, Pennsylvania
- Erie County, Ohio

All three counties are located alongside Lake Erie, one of the Great Lakes in North America. The counties were named after the Indigenous Erie people.

== See also ==
- Erie Township (disambiguation)
- Erie (disambiguation)
