= Buffalo Mountain (Colorado) =

Mountain in the American state of Colorado

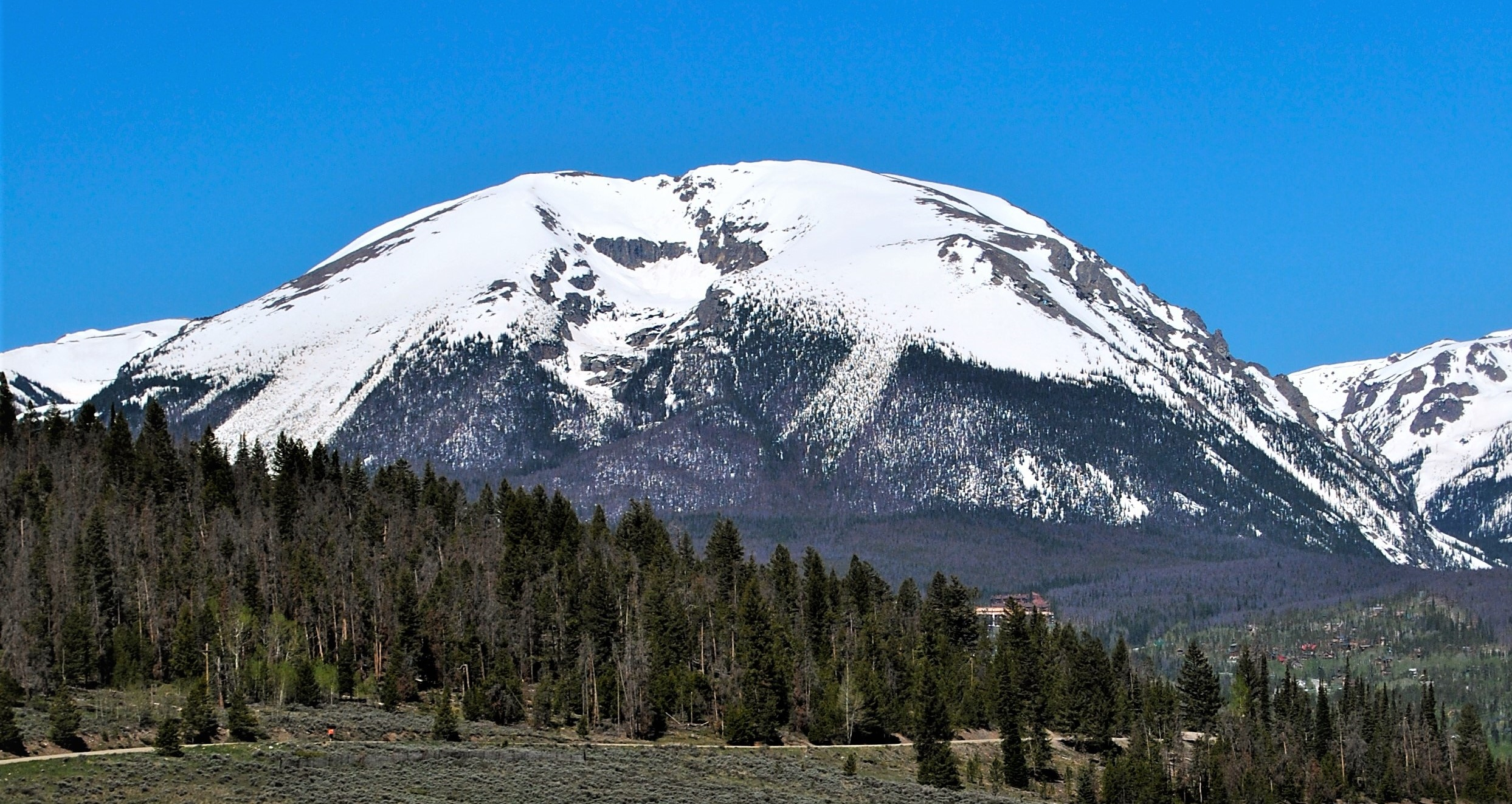
- East aspect

Highest point
- Elevation: 12,781 ft (3,896 m)
- Prominence: 909 ft (277 m)
- Parent peak: Mount Powell (13,586 ft)
- Isolation: 1.84 mi (2.96 km)
- Coordinates: 39°37′00″N 106°08′34″W

Geography
- Location within Colorado Location within the United States
- Country: United States
- State: Colorado
- County: Summit County
- Protected area: Eagles Nest Wilderness
- Parent range: Rocky Mountains; Gore Range
- Topo map: USGS Vail Pass

Climbing
- Easiest route: class 2 hiking

Buffalo Mountain is a 12,781-foot (3,896 m) mountain summit in Summit County, Colorado, United States.

== Description ==
Buffalo Mountain is set in the Gore Range which is a subrange of the Rocky Mountains. The mountain is located 3.5 miles (5.6 km) northwest of the community of Frisco in the Eagles Nest Wilderness on land managed by White River National Forest. It ranks as the sixth-highest peak in the Gore Range and the sixth-highest in the wilderness. Precipitation runoff from the mountain's slopes drains into tributaries of the Blue River. Topographic relief is significant as the summit rises approximately 2,800 feet (853 m) above South Willow Creek in one mile (1.6 km). Buffalo Mountain has several routes for mountaineers and skiers, the most popular of which is the north couloir, also known as Silver Couloir. The mountain's toponym has been officially adopted by the United States Board on Geographic Names. The mountain was so named by Native Americans because its massive rounded form resembled that of the buffalo.

== Climate ==
According to the Köppen climate classification system, Buffalo Mountain is located in an alpine subarctic climate zone with cold, snowy winters, and cool to warm summers. Due to its altitude, it receives precipitation all year, as snow in winter, and as thunderstorms in summer, with a dry period in late spring.

== See also ==
- List of mountain peaks of Colorado

== Gallery ==
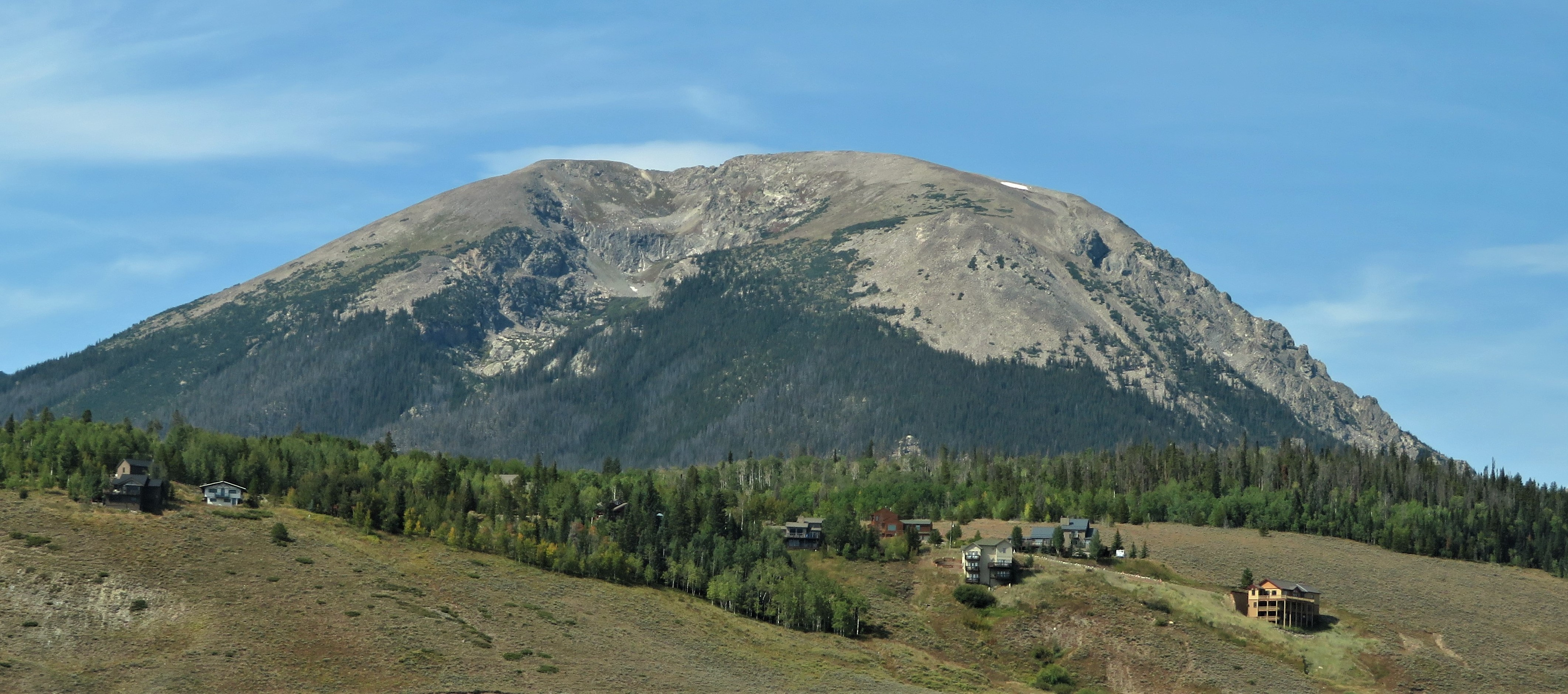
Buffalo Mountain from Silverthorne, Colorado

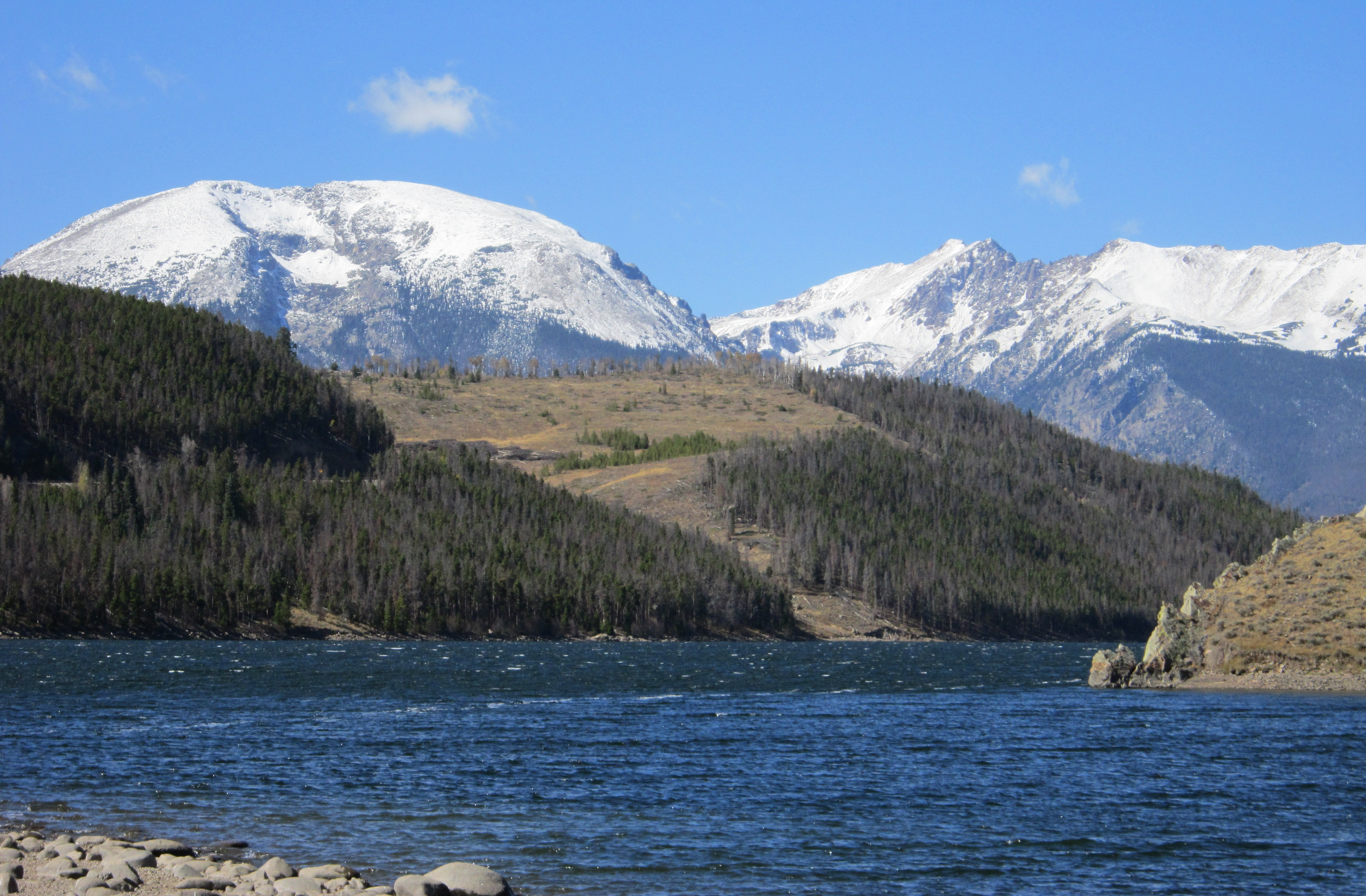
Buffalo Mountain (left) and Red Peak (right) from Dillon Reservoir

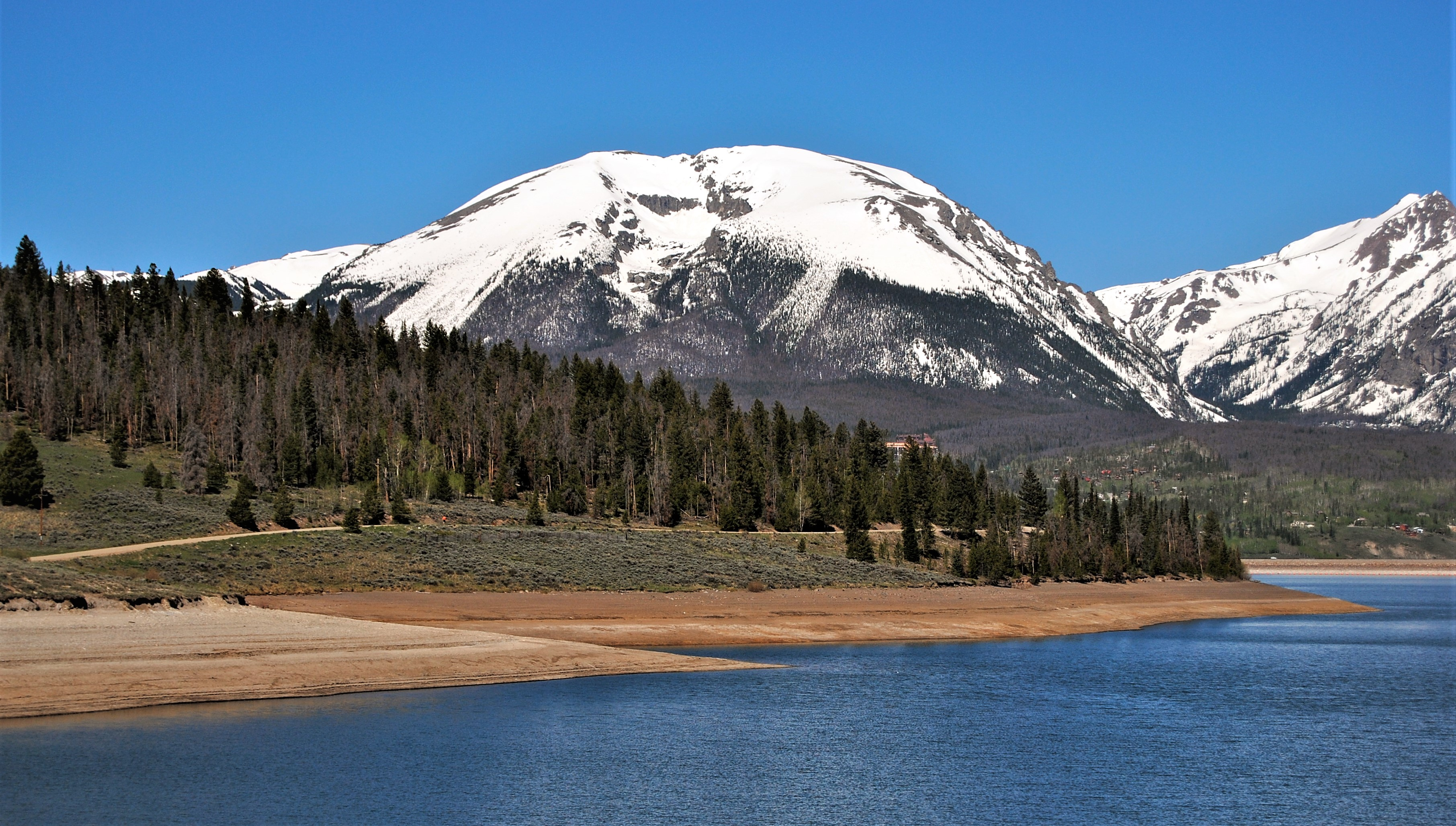
Buffalo Mountain beyond Dillon Reservoir

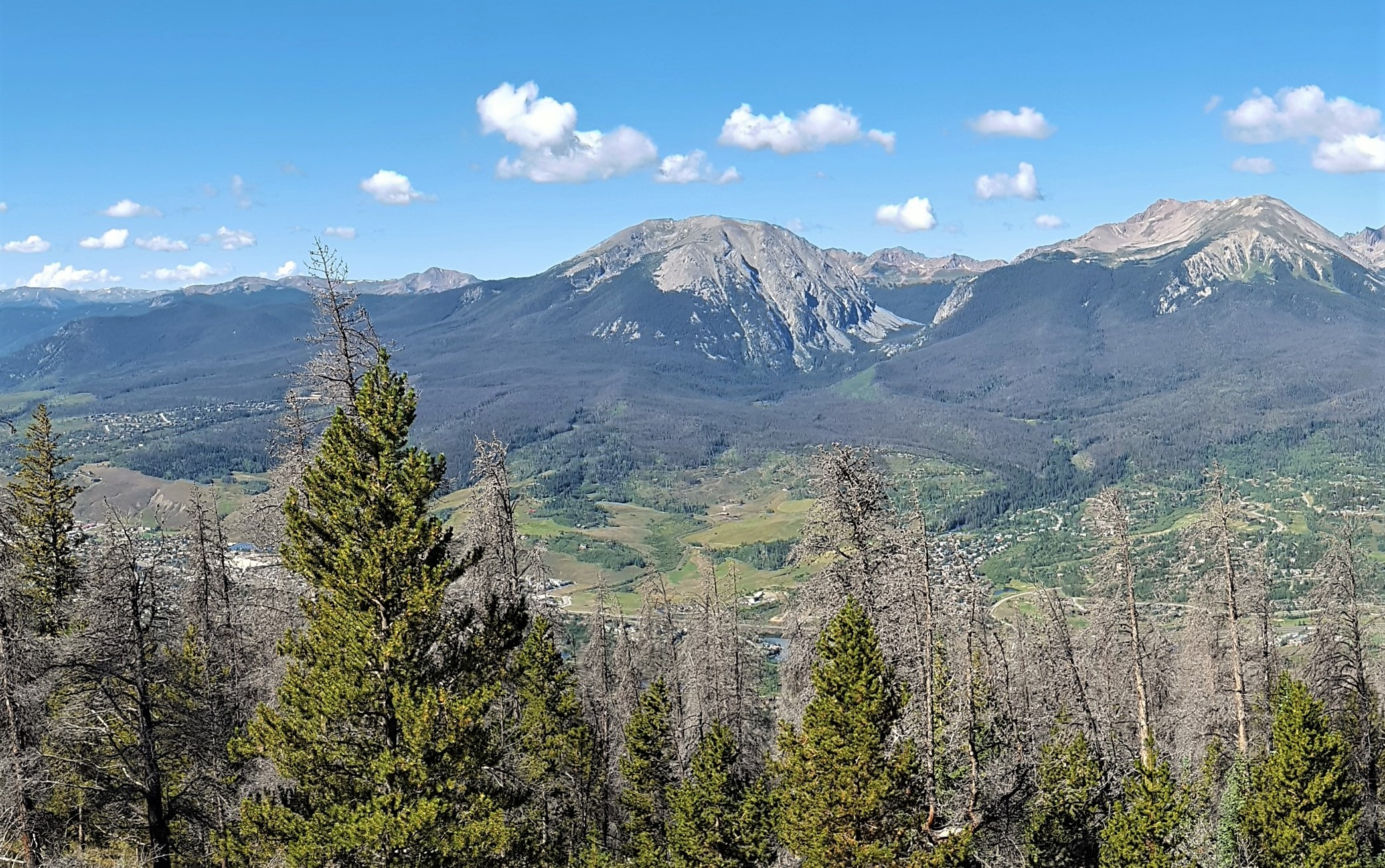
Buffalo Mountain (center) and Red Peak (right)

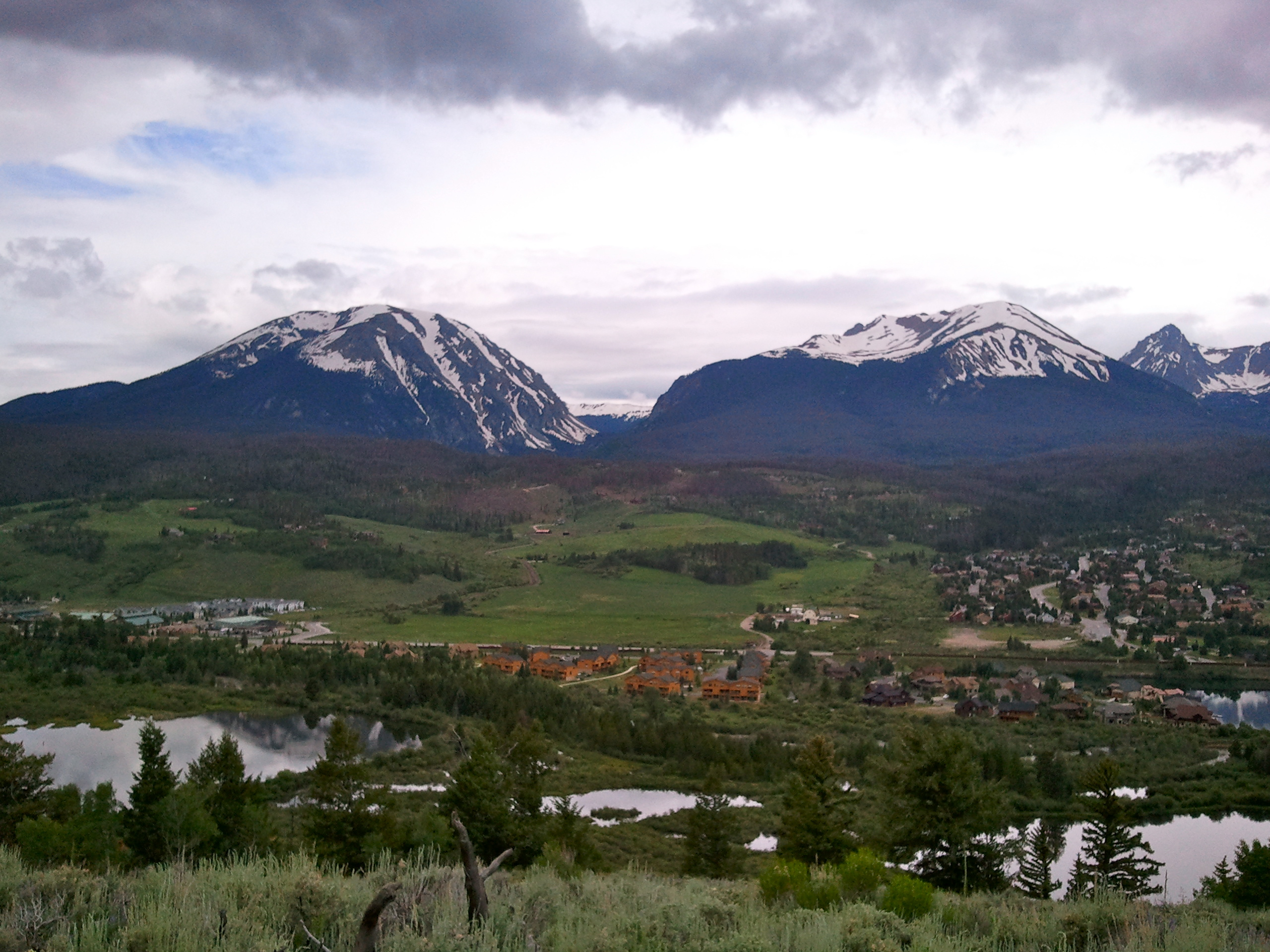
Buffalo Mountain (left) and Red Peak (right)
