= Erie station =

Erie station may refer to:

- Erie station (SEPTA), in Philadelphia, Pennsylvania
- Erie–Torresdale station, in Philadelphia, Pennsylvania
- Union Station (Erie, Pennsylvania)
- Erie station, now Newport station (PATH), in Jersey City, New Jersey

== See also ==
- Erie Railroad Station (disambiguation)
