= Benjamin S. Grossberg =

American poet and educator

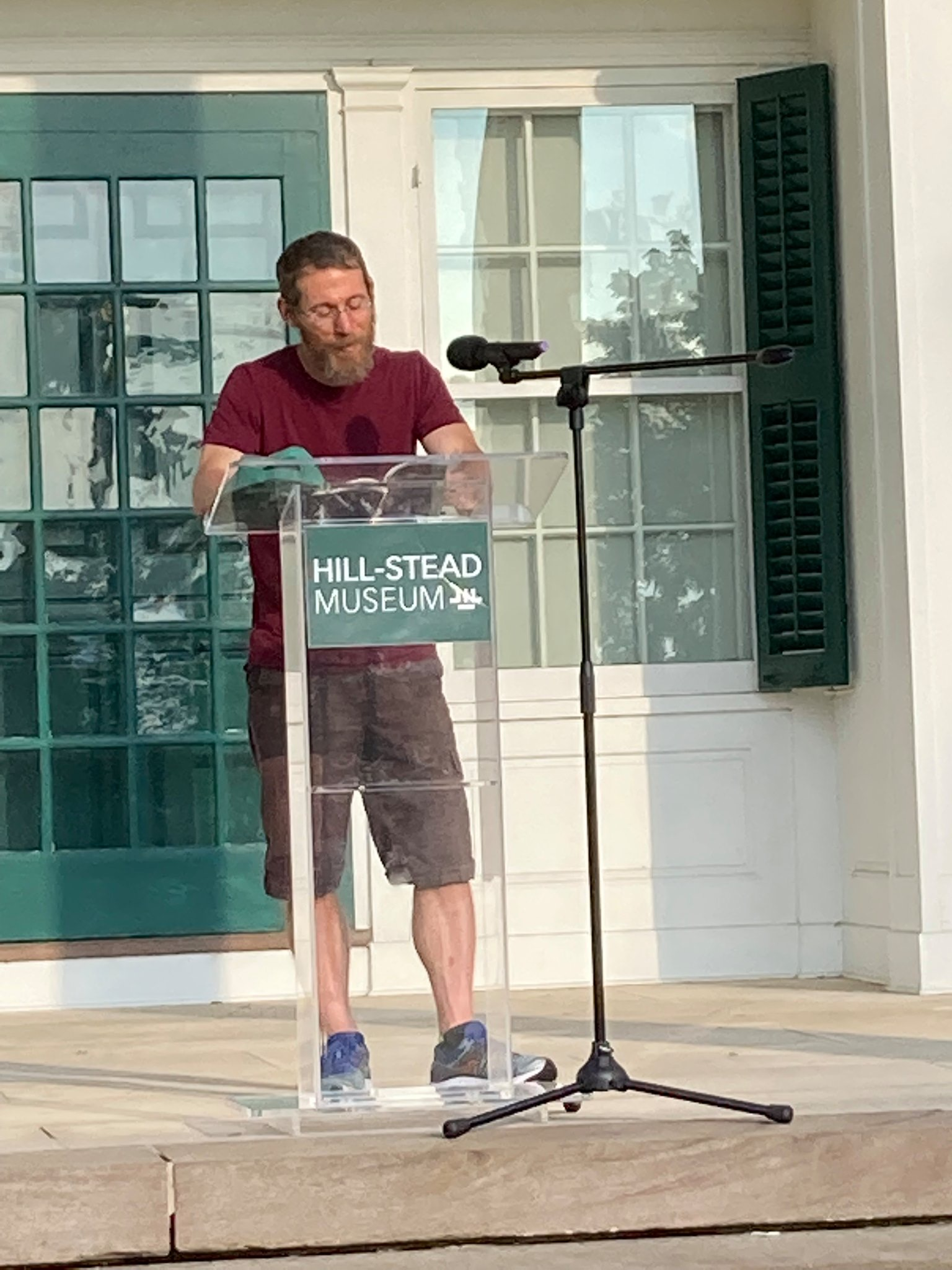
Benjamin S. Grossberg

Benjamin S. Grossberg (born 1971) is an American poet and educator.

== Career ==
Grossberg is the director of creative writing at the University of Hartford and was a professor of literature and creative writing at Antioch College. He is the advisor to the student run literary journal, Aerie. He was the winner of the Lambda Literary Award for Gay Poetry in 2009.

His poems have appeared in the Pushcart Prize and Best American Poetry anthologies, Poetry Daily and Verse Daily, and the magazines Paris Review, The Kenyon Review, Ploughshares, New England Review, Prairie Schooner, North American Review, and The Sun.

== Awards and honors ==
- 2005 Pushcart Prize for "Beetle Orgy"
- 2007 Snyder Prize for Underwater Lengths in a Single Breath
- 2009 Lambda Literary Award for Gay Poetry for Sweet Core Orchard
- 2009 Tampa Review Prize for Sweet Core Orchard
- 2011 The Best American Poetry for "The Space Traveler Talks Frankly About Desire"
- 2016 Christopher Hewitt Award for “Days of 1993, ’94, ’95”
- 2016 Jacar Press Chapbook Competition for An Elegy
- 2020 Foreword Indies Book of the Year in Poetry (Silver) for My Husband Would
- 2021 Connecticut Book Award in poetry for My Husband Would
- 2023 The James Alan McPherson Prize from The Association of Writers & Writing Programs for The Spring before Obergefell
- 2025 Lambda Literary Award for Gay Romance for The Spring before Obergefell

== Grants and fellowships ==
- 1998 Cultural Arts Council of Houston Fellowship
- 2003 Ohio Arts Council Grant
- 2006 Culture Works of Montgomery County, Ohio Grant
- 2011 & 2018 Connecticut Office of the Arts Fellowship (2018)

== Works ==
=== Novel ===
- The Spring Before Obergefell (2024)

=== Poetry collections ===
- Underwater Lengths in a Single Breath (2007)
- Sweet Core Orchard (2009)
- Space Traveler (2014)
- My Husband Would (2020)

=== Poetry chapbooks ===
- The Auctioneer Bangs His Gavel (2006)
- An Elegy (2017)
- As Are Right Fit (2024)

=== Editor ===
- The Poetry of Capital: Voices from Twenty-first Century America (2021)

=== Essays ===
- “‘Numbered Now with the Rest of These’: Robert Boucheron and the Poetry of AIDS” in Poets' Poets: A Renaissance of Words (2025)
- "How To Become A Poet", Door = Jar, (April 2016)
- “Culture Club in Space: An Anecdotal Poetics” in Who's Yer Daddy?: Gay Writers Celebrate Their Mentors and Forerunners (2012)
- “How to Put Words in Someone's Mouth: Teaching the Dramatic Monologue”, AWP: Magazine & Media, Association of Writers and Writers Programs, (July 2013)
- “Through Me”, Superstition Review, Arizona State University (12 December 2013)

== Recordings ==
- "Catherine The Great," The Common Magazine, Issue 17, April 15, 2019
- ”Heaven” & “The Space Traveler Talks Frankly About Desire,” The Brainwaves Video Anthology (2019)
- “In My 47th Year” and “Catawba,” Kenyon Review Out Loud (XLI Number 3, 2019)
- Teachers Make a Difference - Ed Hirsch, The Brainwaves Video Anthology (2019)
- “The Space Traveler and Starlight,” Hartford Courant, September 20, 2018
- “The Space Traveler and Wandering,” on WNPR, Connecticut Public Radio's, Where We Live, June 3, 2014
