= Silverthorne, Colorado =

Town in Colorado, United States

- Home rule town
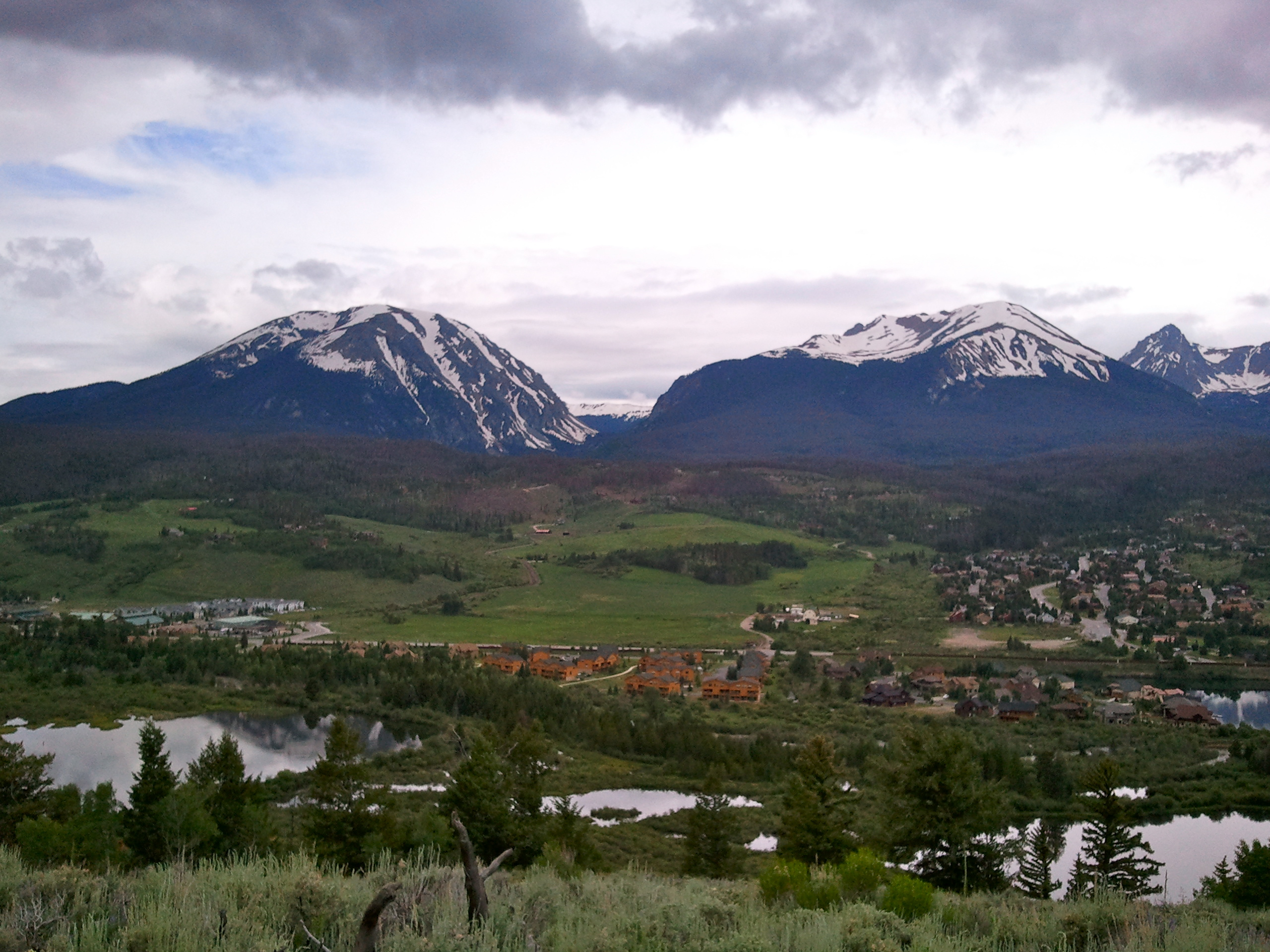
- Silverthorne seen from Ptarmigan Peak. In the background Buffalo Mountain is on the left, while Red Mountain and Mount Silverthorne are located adjacent to each other to the right.

- Logo
- Interactive location map of Silverthorne
- Coordinates: 39°38′24″N 106°04′42″W
- Country: United States
- State: Colorado
- County: Summit County
- Incorporated: September 5, 1967
- Named for: Judge Marshall Silverthorn

Government
  - Type: Mayor–council
  - Mayor: Ann-Marie Sandquist
  - Mayor Pro-Tem: Amy Manka
  - Town Council: Tim Applegate; Bruce Butler; Jonnah Glassman; Tanecia Spagnolia; Erin Young

Area
  - Total: 4.117 sq mi (10.663 km^{2})
  - Land: 4.051 sq mi (10.493 km^{2})
  - Water: 0.066 sq mi (0.170 km^{2}) 1.60%
- Elevation: 8,790 ft (2,680 m)

Population (2020)
  - Total: 4,402
  - Density: 1,087/sq mi (419.5/km^{2})
- Time zone: UTC−7 (Mountain (MST))
  - Summer (DST): UTC−6 (MDT)
- ZIP Codes: 80497, 80498
- Area codes: 970 and 748
- FIPS code: 08-70525
- GNIS feature ID: 2413288
- Website: silverthorne.org

Silverthorne is a town in Summit County, Colorado, United States. The population was 4,402 at the 2020 census.

== History ==
The town was named for Judge Marshall Silverthorn who served as the judge of the Miners' court in Breckenridge. The judge first came to town as a prospector and claimed a section of the Blue River in 1881. After patenting his claim in April 1882, he was disappointed to find the gold to be sparse and the claim a poor bet. The land passed to his daughters on his death in 1887 and was then sold several times to various mining companies. In 1953 Clayton Hill bought the property and subdivided it for homes and stores.

Silverthorne served as a makeshift camp for workers during the construction of the Dillon Reservoir from 1961 to 1963, and later as a stop along Interstate 70. It was eventually incorporated on April 5, 1967.

The town has expanded several times since incorporation by annexation.

Since 2016, the town of Silverthorne has hosted the Silverthon Games, an annual competition featuring a seasonally-based slate of individual and team events, culminating with the heavily spectated Hummingbird Circle race.

== Geography ==
Silverthorne is situated between the Gore Range to the west and the Continental Divide to the east. The two most visible mountains are Buffalo and Red Mountains. Also surrounding the valley are Ptarmigan, Tenderfoot, and Ten Mile Peaks.

According to the United States Census Bureau, the town has a total area of 4.117 square miles (10.66 km^{2}), of which 4.051 square miles (10.49 km^{2}) is land and 0.066 square miles (0.17 km^{2}) (1.60%) is water.

== Climate ==
Silverthorne has a highland-influenced subpolar climate (Köppen (Dfc) with warm summer days, cold nights year round, as well as cold and snowy winter days.

Climate data for Silverthorne (1981–2010, extremes 1910–2018)
Month	Jan	Feb	Mar	Apr	May	Jun	Jul	Aug	Sep	Oct	Nov	Dec	Year
Record high °F (°C)	61 (16)	60 (16)	63 (17)	76 (24)	80 (27)	87 (31)	89 (32)	87 (31)	84 (29)	77 (25)	65 (18)	61 (16)	89 (32)
Mean daily maximum °F (°C)	31.7 (−0.2)	33.9 (1.1)	39.6 (4.2)	47.3 (8.5)	57.3 (14.1)	67.9 (19.9)	74.0 (23.3)	71.9 (22.2)	64.9 (18.3)	53.5 (11.9)	40.2 (4.6)	31.5 (−0.3)	51.1 (10.6)
Mean daily minimum °F (°C)	1.8 (−16.8)	4.0 (−15.6)	11.7 (−11.3)	18.8 (−7.3)	27.3 (−2.6)	33.7 (0.9)	39.0 (3.9)	38.2 (3.4)	30.7 (−0.7)	22.0 (−5.6)	12.6 (−10.8)	3.8 (−15.7)	20.3 (−6.5)
Record low °F (°C)	−44 (−42)	−45 (−43)	−38 (−39)	−25 (−32)	−8 (−22)	11 (−12)	22 (−6)	20 (−7)	4 (−16)	−17 (−27)	−30 (−34)	−46 (−43)	−46 (−43)
Average precipitation inches (mm)	0.81 (21)	0.92 (23)	1.01 (26)	1.26 (32)	1.31 (33)	1.25 (32)	1.95 (50)	1.93 (49)	1.42 (36)	0.90 (23)	0.93 (24)	0.86 (22)	14.55 (371)
Average snowfall inches (cm)	14.7 (37)	15.7 (40)	16.5 (42)	15.8 (40)	5.6 (14)	0.7 (1.8)	0 (0)	0 (0)	1.4 (3.6)	6.6 (17)	14.1 (36)	15.0 (38)	106.1 (269.4)
Average precipitation days (≥ 0.04 in)	6.7	6.5	7.5	7.9	7.2	6.4	9.1	10.2	7.5	5.9	6.7	6.6	88.2
Average snowy days (≥ 0.4 in)	9.5	8.7	9.4	8.5	3.3	0.4	0	0	0.7	3.7	8.1	8.9	61.2
Source: NWS NOWDATA —data from Dillon 1E 1981–2010

== Demographics ==
Historical population
Census	Pop.	Note	%±
1970	400		—
1980	989		147.3%
1990	1,768		78.8%
2000	3,196		80.8%
2010	3,887		21.6%
2020	4,402		13.2%
2024 (est.)	5,220	▲	18.6%
U.S. Decennial Census

According to realtor website Zillow, the average price of a home as of October 31, 2025, in Silverthorne is $846,979.

=== Racial and ethnic composition ===
Silverthorne, Colorado – racial and ethnic composition Note: the US Census treats Hispanic/Latino as an ethnic category. This table excludes Latinos from the racial categories and assigns them to a separate category. Hispanics/Latinos may be of any race.
Race / ethnicity (NH = non-Hispanic)	Pop. 1990	Pop. 2000	Pop. 2010	Pop. 2020	% 1990	% 2000	% 2010	% 2020
White alone (NH)	1,670	2,293	2,618	2,837	94.46%	71.75%	67.35%	64.45%
Black or African American alone (NH)	5	32	88	70	0.28%	1.00%	2.26%	1.59%
Native American or Alaska Native alone (NH)	11	15	6	10	0.62%	0.47%	0.15%	0.23%
Asian alone (NH)	11	23	43	74	0.62%	0.72%	1.11%	1.68%
Pacific Islander alone (NH)	—	9	2	2	—	0.28%	0.05%	0.05%
Other race alone (NH)	1	10	1	10	0.06%	0.31%	0.03%	0.23%
Mixed race or multiracial (NH)	—	63	58	136	—	1.97%	1.49%	3.09%
Hispanic or Latino (any race)	70	751	1,071	1,263	3.96%	23.50%	27.55%	28.69%
Total	1,768	3,196	3,887	4,402	100.00%	100.00%	100.00%	100.00%

=== 2020 census ===
As of the 2020 census, there were 4,402 people, 1,684 households, and 1,162 families residing in the town. The population density was 1,100.22 inhabitants per square mile (424.8/km^{2}). There were 2,551 housing units at an average density of 637.59 per square mile (246.2/km^{2}).

The median age was 39.6 years. 21.1% of residents were under the age of 18 and 14.4% were 65 years of age or older. For every 100 females there were 112.7 males, and for every 100 females age 18 and over there were 112.3 males age 18 and over.

99.4% of residents lived in urban areas, while 0.6% lived in rural areas.

31.9% of households had children under the age of 18 living in them. 54.3% were married-couple households, 19.4% were households with a male householder and no spouse or partner present, and 15.7% were households with a female householder and no spouse or partner present. About 19.4% of all households were made up of individuals, and 5.9% had someone living alone who was 65 years of age or older. 34.0% of housing units were vacant; the homeowner vacancy rate was 1.1% and the rental vacancy rate was 7.8%.

=== Demographic estimates ===
As of the 2023 American Community Survey, there are 2,128 estimated households in Silverthorne with an average of 2.18 persons per household. The town has a median household income of $114,185. Approximately 11.0% of the town's population lives at or below the poverty line. Silverthorne has an estimated 78.2% employment rate, with 48.5% of the population holding a bachelor's degree or higher and 89.7% holding a high school diploma. There were 2,943 housing units at an average density of 726.49 per square mile (280.5/km^{2}).

The top five reported languages (people were allowed to report up to two languages, thus the figures will generally add to more than 100%) were English (86.6%), Spanish (12.5%), Indo-European (0.9%), Asian and Pacific Islander (0.0%), and Other (0.0%).

=== 2010 census ===
As of the 2010 census, there were 3,887 people, 1,451 households, and _ families residing in the town. The population density was 978.60 inhabitants per square mile (377.8/km^{2}). There were 2,061 housing units at an average density of 518.88 per square mile (200.3/km^{2}). The racial makeup of the town was 80.58% White, 2.37% African American, 0.28% Native American, 1.29% Asian, 0.05% Pacific Islander, 12.91% from some other races and 2.52% from two or more races. Hispanic or Latino people of any race were 27.55% of the population.

=== 2000 census ===
As of the 2000 census, there were 3,196 people, 1,103 households, and 736 families residing in the town. The population density was 1,009.1 inhabitants per square mile (389.6/km^{2}). There were 1,582 housing units at an average density of 499.5 per square mile (192.9/km^{2}). The racial makeup of the town was 82.17% White, 1.00% African American, 0.66% Native American, 0.75% Asian, 0.28% Pacific Islander, 11.17% from some other races and 3.97% from two or more races. Hispanic or Latino people of any race were 23.50% of the population.

There were 1,103 households, out of which 36.2% had children under the age of 18 living with them, 53.0% were married couples living together, 6.7% had a female householder with no husband present, and 33.2% were non-families. 13.8% of all households were made up of individuals, and 0.5% had someone living alone who was 65 years of age or older. The average household size was 2.90 and the average family size was 3.14.

In the town, the population was spread out, with 23.1% under the age of 18, 14.8% from 18 to 24, 42.3% from 25 to 44, 17.8% from 45 to 64, and 2.0% who were 65 years of age or older. The median age was 30 years. For every 100 females, there were 130.4 males. For every 100 females age 18 and over, there were 140.7 males.

The median income for a household in the town was $58,839, and the median income for a family was $61,715. Males had a median income of $31,983 versus $27,172 for females. The per capita income for the town was $24,271. About 2.9% of families and 7.2% of the population were below the poverty threshold, including 6.1% of those under age 18, but none were age 65 or over.

== Notable people ==
Notable individuals who were born in or have lived in Silverthorne include:

- Red Gerard (born 2000), Olympic gold medalist snowboarder.
- Tieghan Gerard (born 1993), food blogger of Half Baked Harvest
- Dan Gibbs (born 1976), Colorado state legislator
- Sarah Hirshland (born 1975), chief executive officer of the United States Olympic Committee
- Mike Potekhen (born 1979), race car driver

== See also ==
- Blue River
- Dillon Reservoir
- White River National Forest
