= Aerie =

Aerie (a variant of eyrie) is the bird nest of an eagle, falcon, hawk, or other bird of prey.

Aerie may also refer to:

== Arts, entertainment, and media ==
=== Fictional entities ===
- Aerie (Baldur's Gate), a character in Baldur's Gate II
- Aerie (DC Comics), a character published by DC Comics
- Aerie Class, a class of Starfleet vessel in the Star Trek franchise
- Dragon Aerie, an area in Dark Souls II video game

=== Literature ===
- Aerie (magazine), a literary magazine
- Aerie, a novel in The Dragon Jousters series by Mercedes Lackey
- Aerie, a 2003 novel by Thomas E. Sniegoski in The Fallen series

=== Music ===
- Aerie (album), a 1971 album by John Denver
- "Aerie (Gang of Eagles)", a song by Jefferson Airplane on the album Long John Silver

== Other uses ==
- Aerie (American Eagle Outfitters), an intimate apparel brand of American Eagle Outfitters
- Aeries, the homes of the Fraternal Order of Eagles

== See also ==
- Eagle's Nest (disambiguation)
- Eyrie (disambiguation)
