= Eagles Nest (Colorado) =

Mountain in Colorado, United States

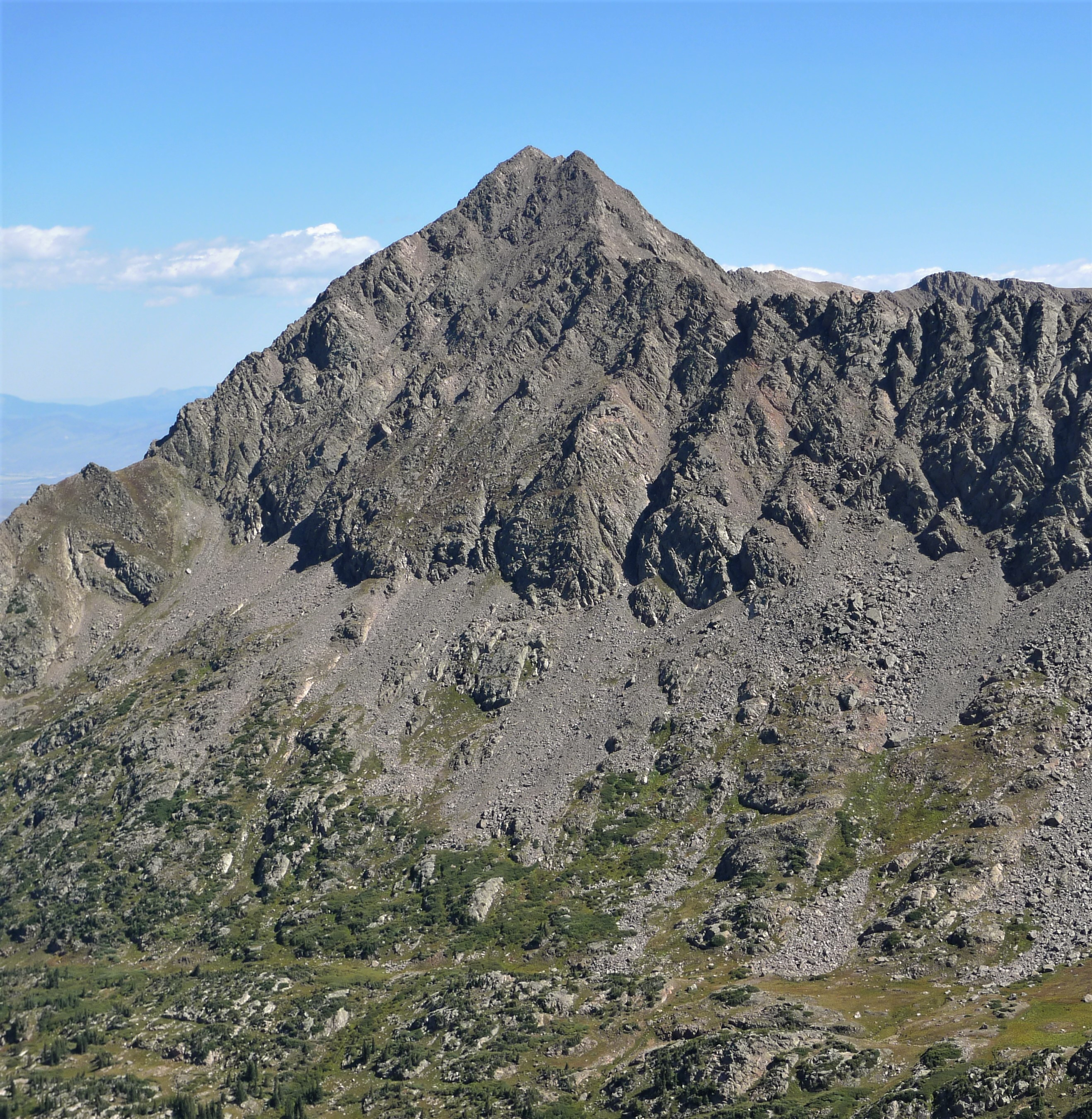
- South-southwest aspect

Highest point
- Elevation: 13,419 ft (4,090 m)
- Prominence: 666 ft (203 m)
- Parent peak: Mount Powell (13,586 ft)
- Isolation: 1.19 mi (1.92 km)
- Coordinates: 39°46′32″N 106°21′01″W

Geography
- Location within Colorado Location within the United States
- Country: United States
- State: Colorado
- County: Summit County
- Protected area: Eagles Nest Wilderness
- Parent range: Rocky Mountains; Gore Range
- Topo map: USGS Mount Powell

Climbing
- Easiest route: class 3 scrambling

Eagles Nest is a 13,419-foot (4,090 m) mountain summit in Summit County, Colorado, United States.

== Description ==
Eagles Nest is set in the Gore Range which is a subrange of the Rocky Mountains. The mountain is located 10 miles (16 km) north of the community of Vail in the Eagles Nest Wilderness on land managed by Arapaho National Forest. It ranks as the 2nd-highest peak in the Gore Range and the 2nd-highest in the wilderness. The nearest higher neighbor is Mount Powell, 1.19 miles (1.92 km) south-southeast, which is the highest of the range. Precipitation runoff from the mountain's east slope drains into Black Creek and the west slope drains to Cataract Creek which are both tributaries of the Blue River. Topographic relief is significant as the summit rises over 2,600 feet (792 m) above Cataract Creek in 0.75 mile (1.21 km). The mountain's toponym was officially adopted in 1968 by the United States Board on Geographic Names.

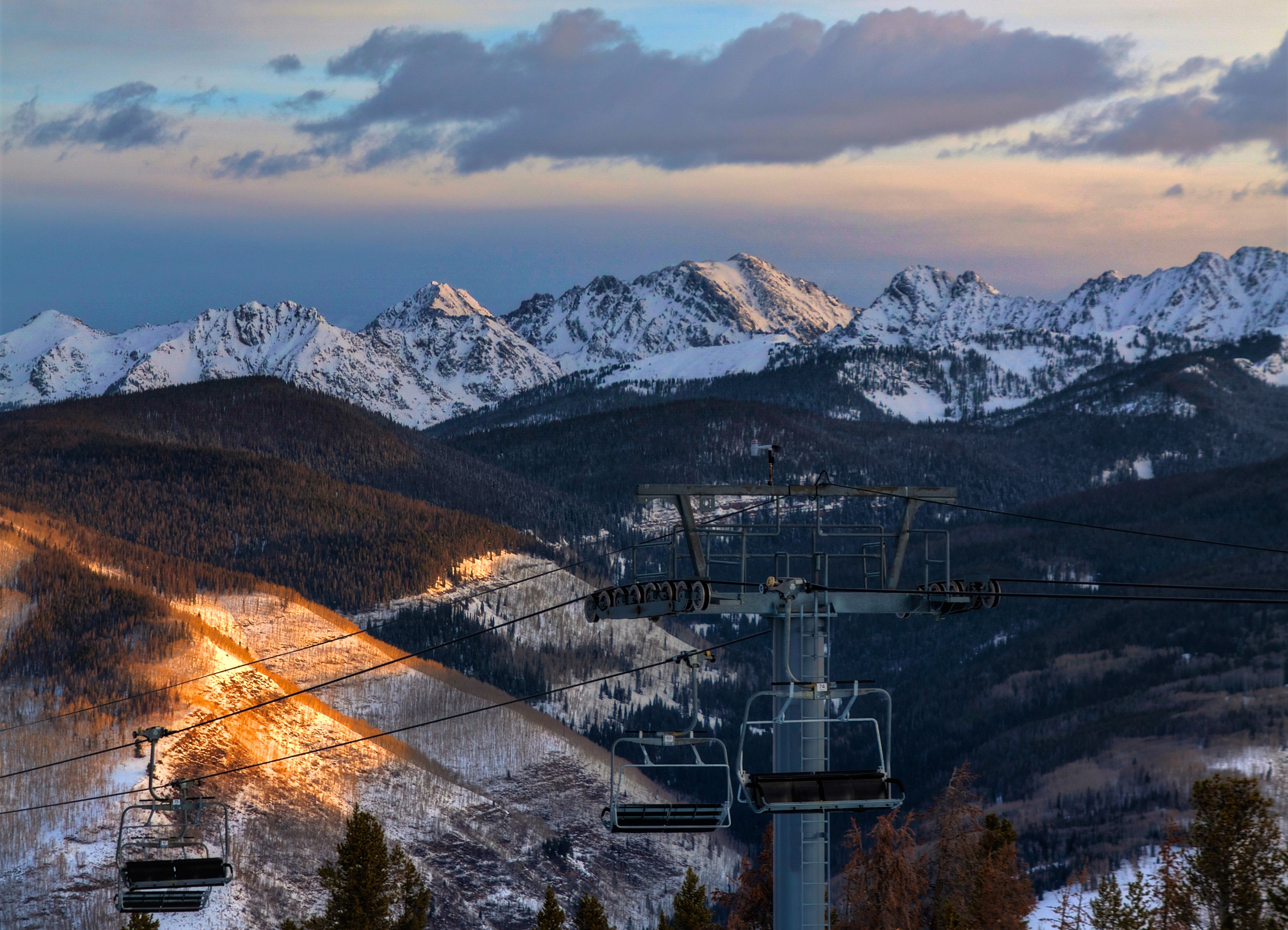
View looking north from Vail ski slopes. Mount Powell centered at top, with Eagles Nest the illuminated peak to left of Powell.

== Climate ==
According to the Köppen climate classification system, Eagles Nest is located in an alpine subarctic climate zone with cold, snowy winters, and cool to warm summers. Due to its altitude, it receives precipitation all year, as snow in winter, and as thunderstorms in summer, with a dry period in late spring.

== See also ==
- List of mountain peaks of Colorado
- Thirteener
