= Lake Erie (disambiguation) =

Lake Erie is one of the five Great Lakes of North America.

Lake Erie may also refer to:

- Lake Erie AVA, an American wine region in the Great Lakes region
- Lake Erie Beach, New York, a hamlet in Evans, New York
- Lake Erie State Park, a park in Portland, New York
- Lake Erie College, a private liberal arts college in Painesville, Ohio
- USS Lake Erie (CG-70) (launched 1991), a Ticonderoga-class guided-missile cruiser in the United States Navy
- Battle of Lake Erie or Battle of Put-in-Bay, an 1813 battle of the War of 1812
- Lake Erie Monsters, an ice hockey team in the American Hockey League

== See also ==
- Erie (disambiguation)
- Lake Eerie, a 2016 horror film
