= Kevin Jerome Everson =

American artist and filmmaker (born 1965)

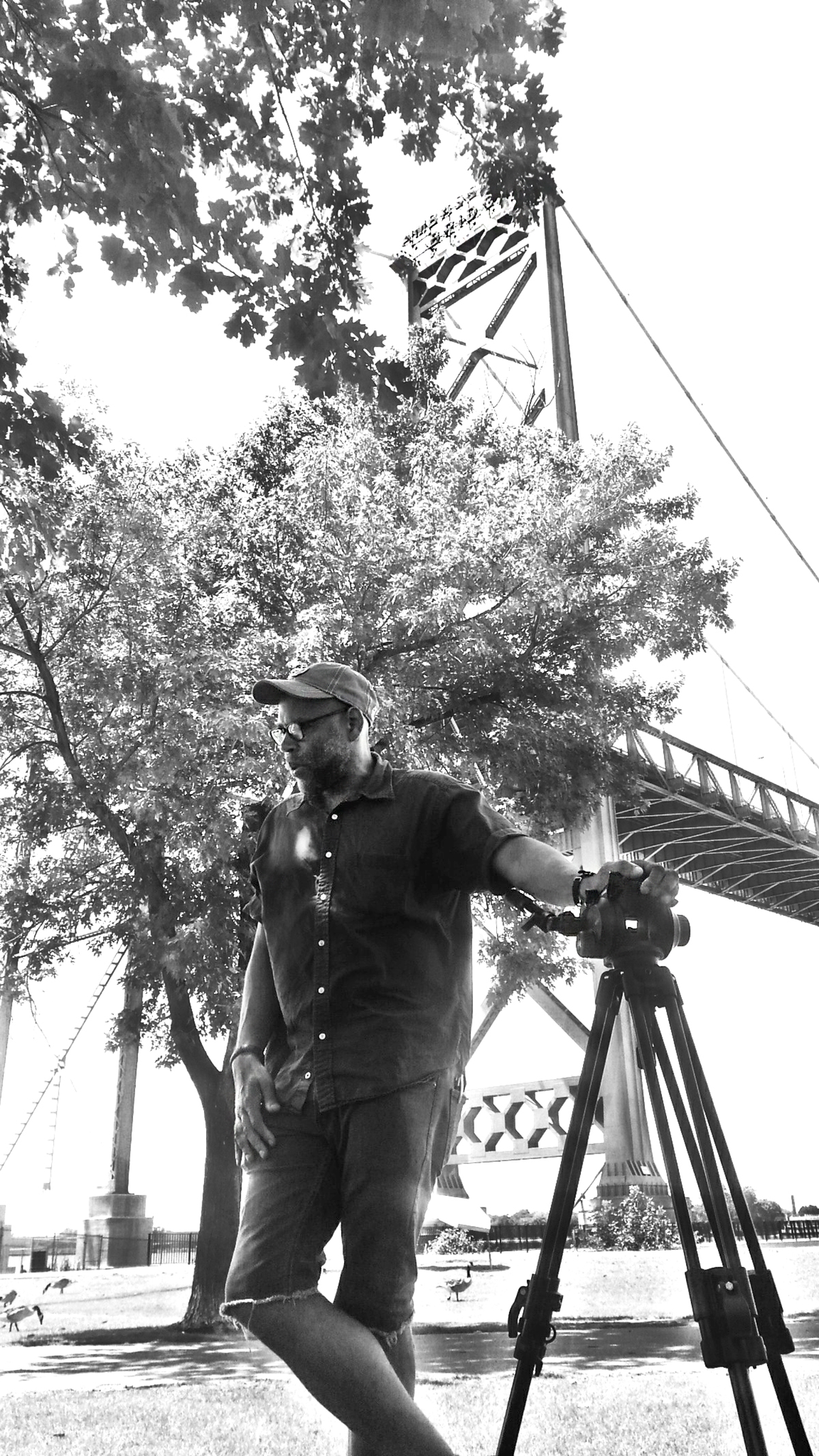
Kevin Jerome Everson in Windsor-Detroit, 2014.

Kevin Jerome Everson (born February 1, 1965) is an artist working in film, painting, sculpture, and photography. He was born in Mansfield, Ohio and currently resides in Virginia. He holds an MFA from Ohio University, and a BFA from the University of Akron, and is Professor of Art at the University of Virginia, Charlottesville.

Everson's films frequently depict people working and living in working-class communities. Many of his works focus on the migration of African American communities and individuals from the American South northward in search of work. "Everson rejects the role of cultural explainer in his work, opting instead to place the burden of understanding on the audience and its own labor. In this way, he has carved a place for himself outside both the typical expectations of documentary and the conventions of representational fiction, attempting to work from the materials of the worlds he encounters to create something else."

Everson frequently employs hand-held camerawork and uses 16mm to create many of his films. His work has been the subject of retrospective screenings at Media City Film Festival (2011), Tate Modern (2017), online at Mubi (2018), and Cinéma du Réel at the Centre Pompidou (2019)

== Full-length films ==
Everson has directed nearly a dozen feature-length films. Erie, filmed during his residency at Hallwall's, Buffalo in 2009 is made up of shots from areas such as Lake Erie, including Niagara Falls, Buffalo, Cleveland and Mansfield, Ohio (Everson's hometown). The scenes "relate to Black migration from the South to the North, realities affecting workers and factories in the automobile industry; contemporary conditions, theater, and famous art objects". Erie was screened as Media City Film Festival's Opening Night feature in Detroit, Michigan in 2010 and won the Grand Prize at Images Festival that same year.

Everson's film The Island of St. Matthews debuted at the 2013 International Film Festival Rotterdam. It features recollections of the 1973 flood of the Tombigbee River in Mississippi, told by residents of Westport, a community just west of Columbus, Mississippi.

Tonsler Park (2017), filmed in black and white, documents four Charlottesville, Virginia polling stations over the course of the US Presidential Election Day in 2016. The film captures the democratic process, most notably in the African-American area surrounding the Tonsler Park polling place. The film takes on additional significance in the wake of the election's outcome (which was a shock to many), as well as in the wake of the violence resulting from the Unite the Right rally in Charlottesville in 2017.

== Short films ==
Everson has created well over 100 short films, including Grand Finale which was featured on Vdrome in January 2018 and It Seems to Hang On exhibited as part of Sonic Rebellion: Music As Resistance organized by the Museum of Contemporary Art Detroit.

== Exhibitions ==
Everson's films have been featured at the Modern and Contemporary Art Museum, Seoul, Korea (February 2017); Viennale (2014); Visions du Reel, Nyon, Switzerland (2012), The Whitney Museum of American Art, NY and Media City Film Festival (2011) and Centre Pompidou, Paris in 2009. His work has been featured at the 2008, 2012, and 2017 Whitney Biennials, the 2010, 2011, 2013, 2014, 2015, 2016, 2017, and 2018 Media City Film Festivals, and the 2013 Sharjah Biennial.

== Awards and fellowships ==
Everson received the 2012 Alpert Award for Film/Video.

He has received fellowships from the Guggenheim, NEA, NEH, Ohio Arts Council, and the Virginia Museum of Fine Arts, an American Academy Rome Prize, grants from the Wexner Center for the Arts, Creative Capital and the Mid-Atlantic, residencies at Mobile Frames / Media City Film Festival (Windsor/Detroit), Hallwalls Contemporary Arts Center, Yaddo and MacDowell Colony, and numerous university fellowships.

In 2019, he received the 24th Annual Heinz Award in the Arts and Humanities for "a prolific body of documentary, art and short-form films that offer diverse portrayals of the lives and experiences of working-class African Americans, and poignantly explore the concepts of labor and work."

In 2021, he was selected as jury member for International competition section of 74th Locarno Film Festival held from 4 to 14 August.
