= Mount Erie =

Mount Erie may refer to:

- Mount Erie, Illinois, a village in the U.S. state of Illinois
- Mount Erie (Washington), an area and mountain near the U.S. town of Anacortes, Washington

== See also ==
- Mount Eerie, band
- Mount Eerie (album), album by the Microphones
