= The Eagle's Nest (painting) =

Painting by Edwin Landseer

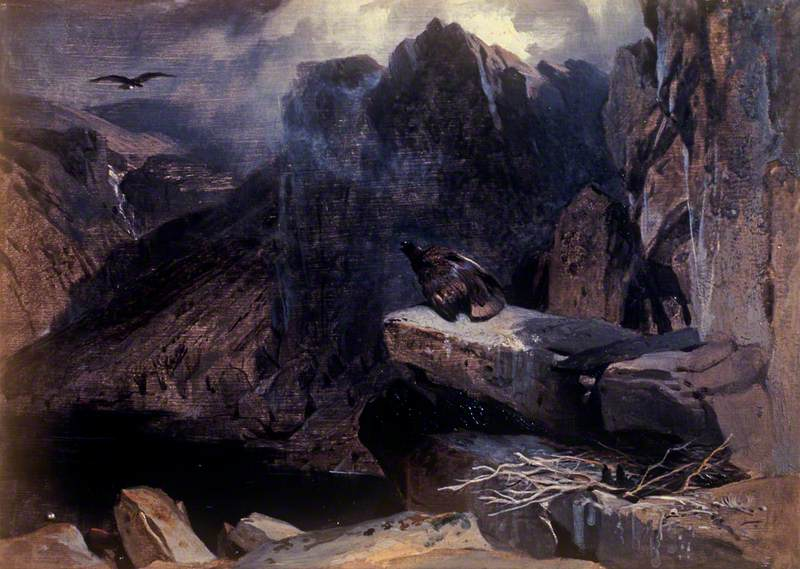
- Artist: Edwin Landseer
- Year: 1833
- Type: Oil on board, genre painting
- Dimensions: 25.4 cm × 35.6 cm (10.0 in × 14.0 in)
- Location: Victoria and Albert Museum; London

The Eagle's Nest is an 1833 oil painting by the British artist Edwin Landseer featuring the nest of an eagle, with one bird calling to her returning mate. It was likely inspired by a visit Landseer had made to the Cairngorm Mountains in the Scottish Highlands.

Landseer displayed the painting at the annual exhibition of the British Institution in Pall Mall in 1834. It was acquired by the noted art collector John Sheepshanks. In 1857 he donated it to the Victoria and Albert Museum in South Kensington as part of the large Sheepshanks Gift.

== Bibliography ==
- Conrad, Peter. The Victorian Treasure-house. Collins, 1973.
- Ormond, Richard. The Monarch of the Glen: Landseer in the Highlands. National Galleries of Scotland, 2005
- Roe, Sonia. Oil Paintings in Public Ownership in the Victoria and Albert Museum. Public Catalogue Foundation, 2008.
