= Eyrie =

An eyrie (a variant of aerie) is a bird nest of an eagle, falcon, hawk, or other bird of prey.

Eyrie may also refer to:

== Places ==
- Eyrie Bay, a bay in Antarctica
- Glen Eyrie, a castle near Colorado Springs, Colorado
- The Eyrie Vineyards, an American winery in Oregon
- Villa Eyrie Resort, a Canadian resort on Vancouver Island on the Malahat

== Arts, entertainment, and media ==
- Eyrie (novel), a novel by Tim Winton
- "Hope Eyrie" (a.k.a. "The Eagle Has Landed"), a song by Leslie Fish
- The Eyrie, a castle in A Song of Ice and Fire and its TV adaptation Game of Thrones
- Eyries, a species of griffin Neopets.
- Eyrie Dynasty, a faction in the board game Root.
- "The Eyrie," the letters column of the Weird Tales magazine

== See also ==
- Aerie (disambiguation)
- Eagle's Nest (disambiguation)
- Eerie, an American magazine of horror comics
- Erie, Pennsylvania
- Ireland or Éire
- Snowdonia or Eryri
- Jean-Baptiste Benoît Eyriès (1767–1846), French geographer, author and translator
