= Erie High School =

Erie High School may refer to one of several high schools in the United States:

- Erie High School (Colorado) in Erie, Colorado
- Erie High School (Illinois) in Erie, Illinois
- Erie High School (Kansas) in Erie, Kansas
- Erie High School (Pennsylvania), in Erie, Pennsylvania
