= Eagle's Nest Airport (Virginia) =

Coordinates: 38°04′37″N 078°56′39″W

Waynesboro Eagle's Nest Airport
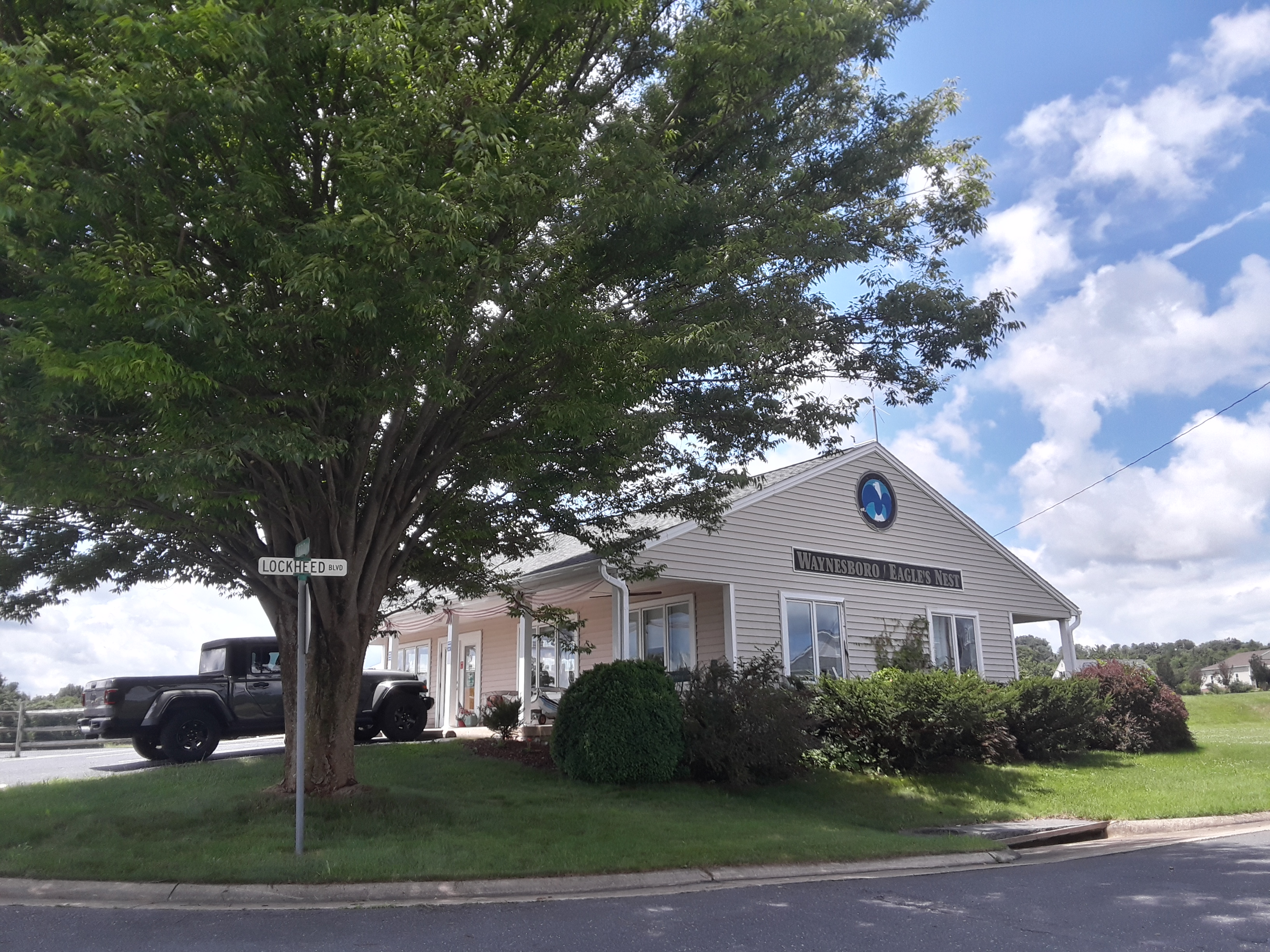
- Terminal building in July 2023
- IATA: none; ICAO: none; FAA LID: W13

Summary
- Airport type: Public
- Owner: Michael L. Fogle
- Location: Waynesboro, Virginia
- Elevation AMSL: 1,436 ft (438 m)
- Website: www.EaglesNest.aero
- Interactive map of Waynesboro Eagle's Nest Airport

Runways
Direction	Length		Surface
Direction	ft	m	Surface
6/24	2,004	611	Asphalt

Statistics (2021)
- Aircraft operations: 14,257
- Based aircraft: 64
- Source: Federal Aviation Administration

Waynesboro Eagle's Nest Airport (FAA LID: W13) is a public-use airport located three miles (5 km) west of the central business district of Waynesboro, in Augusta County, Virginia, United States. It is privately owned by Michael L. Fogle.

== Facilities and aircraft ==
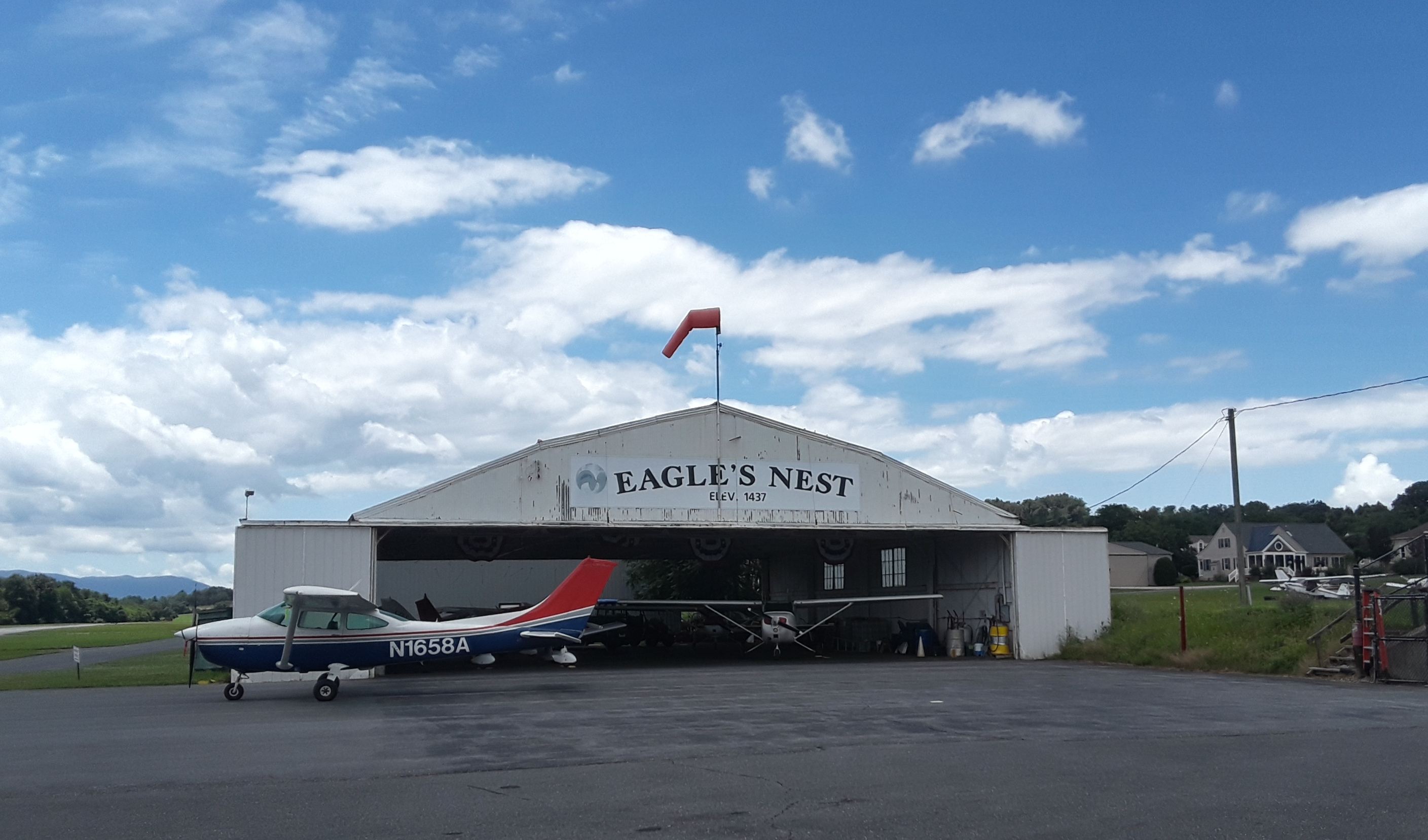
Hangar at the airport, July 2023

Eagle's Nest Airport covers an area of 40 acres (16 ha) which contains one asphalt paved runway (6/24) measuring 2,004 x 50 ft (610 x 15 m). It is the shortest improved runway in the state of Virginia.

For the 12-month period ending December 31, 2021, the airport had 14,257 aircraft operations, an average of 39 per day: 93% general aviation and 7% air taxi. There are 64 aircraft based at this airport: 60 single-engine, 3 multi-engine and 1 glider.
