= Erie Airport =

Erie Airport may refer to:

- Erie Aerodrome in Erie Township, Michigan, United States (FAA: M84)
- Erie International Airport near Erie, Pennsylvania, United States (IATA/FAA: ERI)
- Erie Municipal Airport in Erie, Colorado, United States (FAA: EIK)
- Erie-Ottawa Regional Airport in Ottawa County, Ohio, United States (FAA: PCW)
