= Aerie (magazine) =

Student literary magazine

- Categories: Literary magazine
- Frequency: Annual
- Publisher: University of Hartford
- First issue: 1996
- Country: United States
- Based in: West Hartford, Connecticut
- Language: English
- Website: uhartaerie.wixsite.com/website

Aerie is a literary magazine established in 1996 at the University of Hartford, though the journal has roots dating back to the early 1970s. Presently, it is run through a student board. It is released annually in the spring semester, with a notable exception in 2020 and 2021 due to the COVID-19 pandemic.

== History ==
Aerie was preceded by a small literary magazine, The Hog River Review, that was started in 1972. Other campus publications included: From the Workshop, a product of Friday afternoon get-togethers; Explorations, composed exclusively of freshman literary accomplishments; and Conception, a creation of the English Department's honor society, Sigma Tau Delta. When Aerie was started in 1996, it served as a venue for the English Department to publish pieces from the department's annual writing contest. This new literary magazine was run exclusively by faculty.

Aerie did not exist in its current form until Volume 5 in 2001 when a student editorial board took the reins. The magazine then began accepting submissions from undergraduate students. Erin Striff was the faculty advisor for the 2023-2024 academic year; before and since then, however, Benjamin Grossberg has been the primary faculty advisor.

== See also ==
- List of literary magazines
