= Erie Railroad Station =

Erie Railroad Station may refer to:

- Erie Railroad Station (Susquehanna, Pennsylvania)
- Erie Railroad Station (Jamestown, New York)
- Port Jervis station (Erie Railroad), known also as Erie Depot
- Erie Railroad Depot (Rochester, New York)

== See also ==
- Erie station (disambiguation)
