= Erie (film) =

2010 film by Kevin Jerome Everson

- Film poster
- Directed by: Kevin Jerome Everson
- Release date: 2010
- Country: United States

Erie is a 2010 film directed by Kevin Jerome Everson. The scenes "relate to Black migration from the South to the North, realities affecting workers and factories in the automobile industry; contemporary conditions, theater, and famous art objects". Erie was screened as Media City Film Festival's Opening Night feature in Detroit, Michigan in 2010 and won the Grand Prize at Images Festival that same year.
