= Mount Powell (Colorado) =

Mountain in Colorado, United States

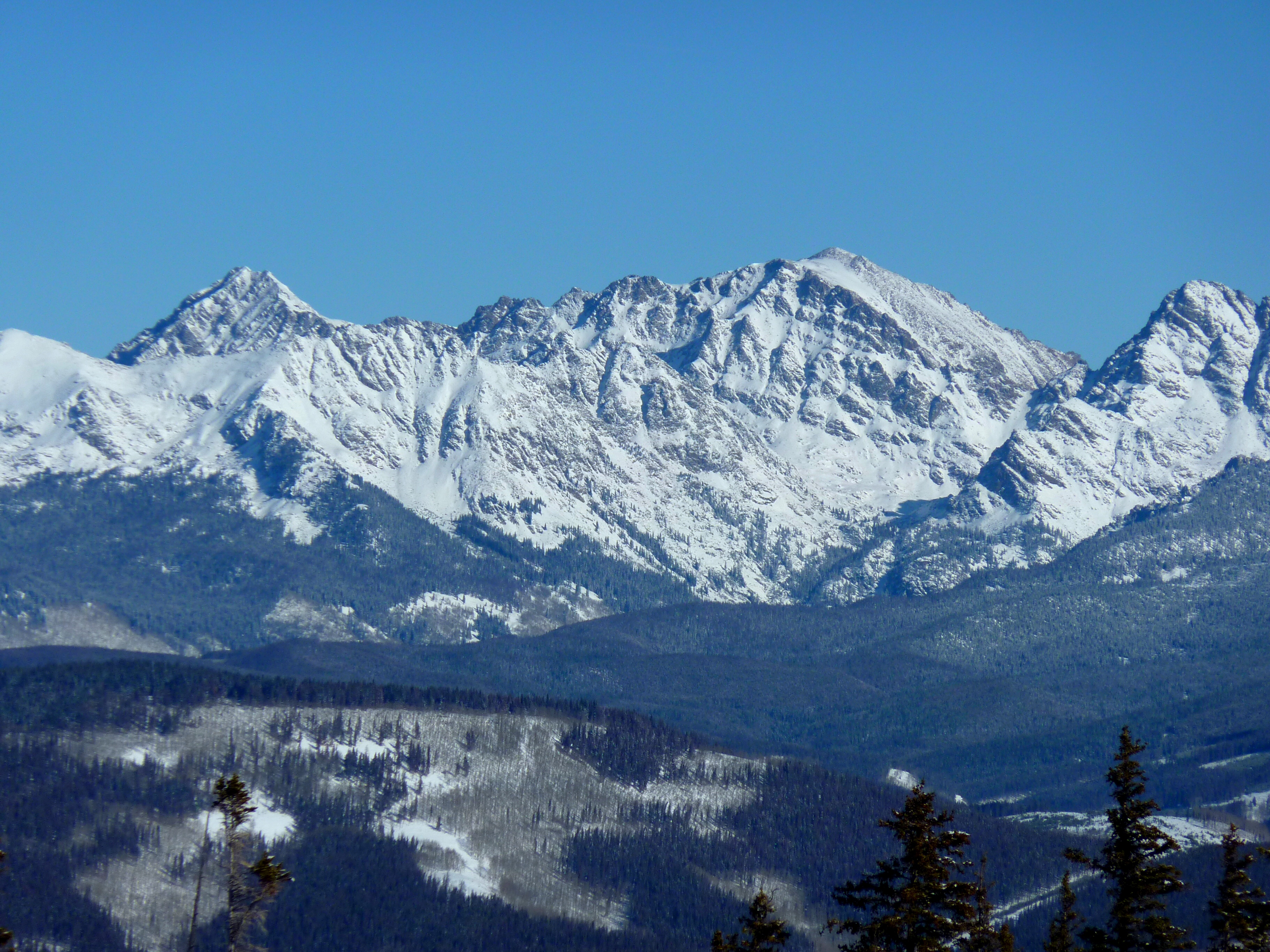
- Southwest aspect, from Beaver Creek Ski Resort (Eagles Nest to left)

Highest point
- Elevation: 13,586 ft (4,141 m)
- Prominence: 3,000 ft (914 m)
- Isolation: 21.50 mi (34.60 km)
- Listing: North America highest peaks 88th; US highest major peaks 71st; Colorado highest major peaks 36th
- Coordinates: 39°45′36″N 106°20′27″W

Naming
- Etymology: John Wesley Powell

Geography
- Location within Colorado
- Location: Eagle and Summit counties, Colorado, United States
- Parent range: Highest summit of the Gore Range
- Topo map(s): USGS 7.5' topographic map Mount Powell, Colorado

Mount Powell is the highest summit of the Gore Range in the Rocky Mountains of North America. The prominent 13,586-foot (4,141 m) thirteener is located in the Eagles Nest Wilderness, 8.5 miles (13.7 km) north by east (bearing 8°) of the Town of Vail, Colorado, United States, along the drainage divide separating White River National Forest and Eagle County from Arapaho National Forest and Summit County. Mount Powell was named in honor of John Wesley Powell who climbed to the summit in 1868.

== Mountain ==
Mount Powell is very prominent when viewed from the north east, rising 6,000 feet above Green Mountain Reservoir.

== Climate ==
Climate data for Mount Powell 39.7597 N, 106.3412 W, Elevation: 13,114 ft (3,997 m) (1991–2020 normals)
Month	Jan	Feb	Mar	Apr	May	Jun	Jul	Aug	Sep	Oct	Nov	Dec	Year
Mean daily maximum °F (°C)	21.3 (−5.9)	20.8 (−6.2)	26.5 (−3.1)	32.8 (0.4)	41.4 (5.2)	52.4 (11.3)	59.2 (15.1)	56.4 (13.6)	49.9 (9.9)	38.2 (3.4)	27.7 (−2.4)	21.4 (−5.9)	37.3 (2.9)
Daily mean °F (°C)	10.3 (−12.1)	9.5 (−12.5)	14.5 (−9.7)	20.1 (−6.6)	28.9 (−1.7)	39.2 (4.0)	45.8 (7.7)	43.8 (6.6)	37.3 (2.9)	26.7 (−2.9)	17.3 (−8.2)	10.8 (−11.8)	25.4 (−3.7)
Mean daily minimum °F (°C)	−0.7 (−18.2)	−1.9 (−18.8)	2.5 (−16.4)	7.4 (−13.7)	16.4 (−8.7)	26.0 (−3.3)	32.5 (0.3)	31.2 (−0.4)	24.7 (−4.1)	15.2 (−9.3)	6.8 (−14.0)	0.1 (−17.7)	13.4 (−10.4)
Average precipitation inches (mm)	3.93 (100)	4.16 (106)	4.51 (115)	5.51 (140)	3.57 (91)	1.59 (40)	2.08 (53)	2.08 (53)	2.47 (63)	3.48 (88)	3.84 (98)	4.09 (104)	41.31 (1,051)
Source: PRISM Climate Group

== See also ==
- List of mountain peaks of North America
  - List of mountain peaks of the United States
    - List of mountain peaks of Colorado
