= Erie Township =

Erie Township may refer to:

- Erie Township, Whiteside County, Illinois
- Erie Township, Miami County, Indiana
- Erie Township, Neosho County, Kansas
- Erie Township, Sedgwick County, Kansas
- Erie Township, Michigan
- Erie Township, Becker County, Minnesota
- Erie Township, North Dakota
- Erie Township, Ottawa County, Ohio
