= Eagles Nest Wilderness =

U.S. Wilderness Area in Colorado

- IUCN category Ib (wilderness area)
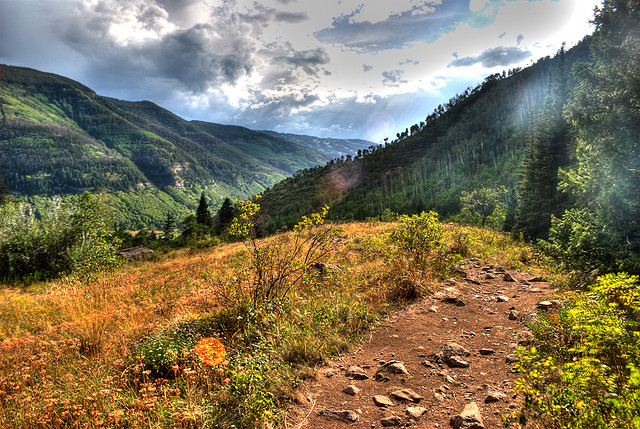
- Eagles Nest Wilderness Area near Vail, Colorado

- Location within the United States
- Location: Eagle/Summit counties, Colorado, United States
- Nearest city: Vail, CO
- Coordinates: 39°42′00″N 106°15′00″W
- Area: 135,114 acres (546.79 km^{2})
- Established: 1978
- Governing body: U.S. Forest Service

The Eagles Nest Wilderness is a U.S. Wilderness Area located in the Gore Range near Vail, Copper Mountain, Frisco, Silverthorne, and Heeney, in Summit and Eagle Counties, Colorado. Eagles Nest Wilderness falls within the jurisdiction of Dillon Ranger District and Holy Cross Ranger District, White River National Forest. The 135,114-acre (546.79 km^{2}) wilderness with 180 miles (290 km) of trails was established in 1976. In 2010, additional lands were proposed for wilderness protection under the Hidden Gems proposal, affecting Elliot Ridge, Tenmile, and Lower Piney areas of Summit and Eagle Counties.

The Eagles Nest Wilderness lies in the southern area of the Gore Range of mountains. The Gore Range was named in honor of Sir George Gore arising from a hunting expedition led by Jim Bridger (1804–1881), an early trapper and explorer of the Rocky Mountains. Bridger documented the Great Salt Lake in 1824 and guided westward settlers through Bridger Pass in 1850, shortening the Oregon Trail by 61 miles (98 km). In 1854, Sir George Gore hired Bridger as a hunting guide out of Fort Leavenworth, Kansas. The Gore expedition traveled through the central Colorado mountain range before heading north into the Yellowstone area. Gore practiced a policy of heavy treading on the land, hauling 30 wagons and more than 50 servants on his expedition of 6,000 miles. Gore shot thousands of large game animals during his guided tour of the mountains that extended into 1855.

Subsequently, the Gore Range became a site of interest to miners seeking gold and silver during the latter half of the nineteenth century. Many mine tailings and shallow digs exist throughout the Gore Range, including the former Boss Mine ruins along the Rock Creek Trail. The earliest rumors of gold in the area were based on trading with the local Ute people. Then, a member of the Gore expedition discovered gold in the area surrounding Piney Lake, near the present Upper Piney Lake Trail north of Vail. Lemuel Pollard, a member of the Bela M. Hughes party, discovered gold when passing through the Gore Range. Numerous other gold seekers left the slopes of the Gore Range pock-marked with diggings that remain part of the features of the landscape within the forest.

Hiking trails within the Eagles Nest Wilderness Area include Gore Range Trail, Buffalo Mountain Trail, South Willow Creek Trail, Rock Creek Trail, Cataract Lake Loop Trail, Mirror Lake Trail, Eaglesmere Lakes Trail, Tipperary Lake Trail, Salmon Willow Trail, Meadow Creek Trail, North Tenmile Creek Trail, Gore Creek Trail, Deluge Lake Trail, Booth Creek Trail, Upper Piney Lake Trail, Pitkin Creek Trail, Elliot Ridge Trail, and Wheeler Lakes Trail.

The two highest peaks in the wilderness are Mount Powell (13,586 ft) and Eagles Nest (13,419 ft).

== Climate ==
Summit Ranch and Silverthorne 7.4 NW are weather stations on the eastern edge of the Eagle Nest Wilderness below Keller Mountain (Colorado).

Climate data for Summit Ranch, Colorado, 1991–2020 normals, 1986-2020 extremes: 9400ft (2865m)
Month	Jan	Feb	Mar	Apr	May	Jun	Jul	Aug	Sep	Oct	Nov	Dec	Year
Record high °F (°C)	53 (12)	56 (13)	64 (18)	69 (21)	83 (28)	97 (36)	97 (36)	88 (31)	92 (33)	86 (30)	68 (20)	52 (11)	97 (36)
Mean maximum °F (°C)	45.3 (7.4)	48.8 (9.3)	56.7 (13.7)	63.0 (17.2)	72.6 (22.6)	80.2 (26.8)	82.0 (27.8)	79.1 (26.2)	75.4 (24.1)	67.1 (19.5)	54.4 (12.4)	46.0 (7.8)	82.9 (28.3)
Mean daily maximum °F (°C)	30.7 (−0.7)	33.7 (0.9)	41.7 (5.4)	48.2 (9.0)	58.0 (14.4)	69.4 (20.8)	73.3 (22.9)	70.5 (21.4)	64.0 (17.8)	51.7 (10.9)	38.8 (3.8)	30.2 (−1.0)	50.9 (10.5)
Daily mean °F (°C)	18.0 (−7.8)	20.6 (−6.3)	27.9 (−2.3)	34.5 (1.4)	43.0 (6.1)	51.9 (11.1)	56.5 (13.6)	54.4 (12.4)	48.3 (9.1)	38.1 (3.4)	26.2 (−3.2)	17.8 (−7.9)	36.4 (2.5)
Mean daily minimum °F (°C)	5.2 (−14.9)	7.3 (−13.7)	13.9 (−10.1)	20.8 (−6.2)	28.1 (−2.2)	34.3 (1.3)	39.7 (4.3)	38.4 (3.6)	32.5 (0.3)	24.3 (−4.3)	13.6 (−10.2)	5.4 (−14.8)	22.0 (−5.6)
Mean minimum °F (°C)	−14.5 (−25.8)	−12.7 (−24.8)	−6.1 (−21.2)	4.6 (−15.2)	15.6 (−9.1)	26.4 (−3.1)	32.4 (0.2)	30.6 (−0.8)	22.0 (−5.6)	7.2 (−13.8)	−7.9 (−22.2)	−15.3 (−26.3)	−18.7 (−28.2)
Record low °F (°C)	−24 (−31)	−22 (−30)	−16 (−27)	−8 (−22)	5 (−15)	18 (−8)	20 (−7)	17 (−8)	11 (−12)	−10 (−23)	−18 (−28)	−31 (−35)	−31 (−35)
Average precipitation inches (mm)	2.24 (57)	2.24 (57)	2.56 (65)	2.99 (76)	2.04 (52)	1.19 (30)	1.64 (42)	1.63 (41)	1.49 (38)	1.85 (47)	2.09 (53)	2.08 (53)	24.04 (611)
Average snowfall inches (cm)	21.8 (55)	21.0 (53)	22.8 (58)	21.6 (55)	9.9 (25)	0.7 (1.8)	0.0 (0.0)	0.0 (0.0)	5.9 (15)	11.0 (28)	18.7 (47)	27.1 (69)	160.5 (406.8)
Average precipitation days (≥ 0.01 in)	12.6	12.5	13.4	13.4	9.7	6.0	8.0	8.2	7.3	8.8	11.4	11.2	122.5
Source 1: XMACIS2 (Summit Ranch normals & Silverthorne 7.4 2003-2020 snowfall)
Source 2: NOAA (precip/precip days)
