= Gore Range =

Mountain range in Colorado, US

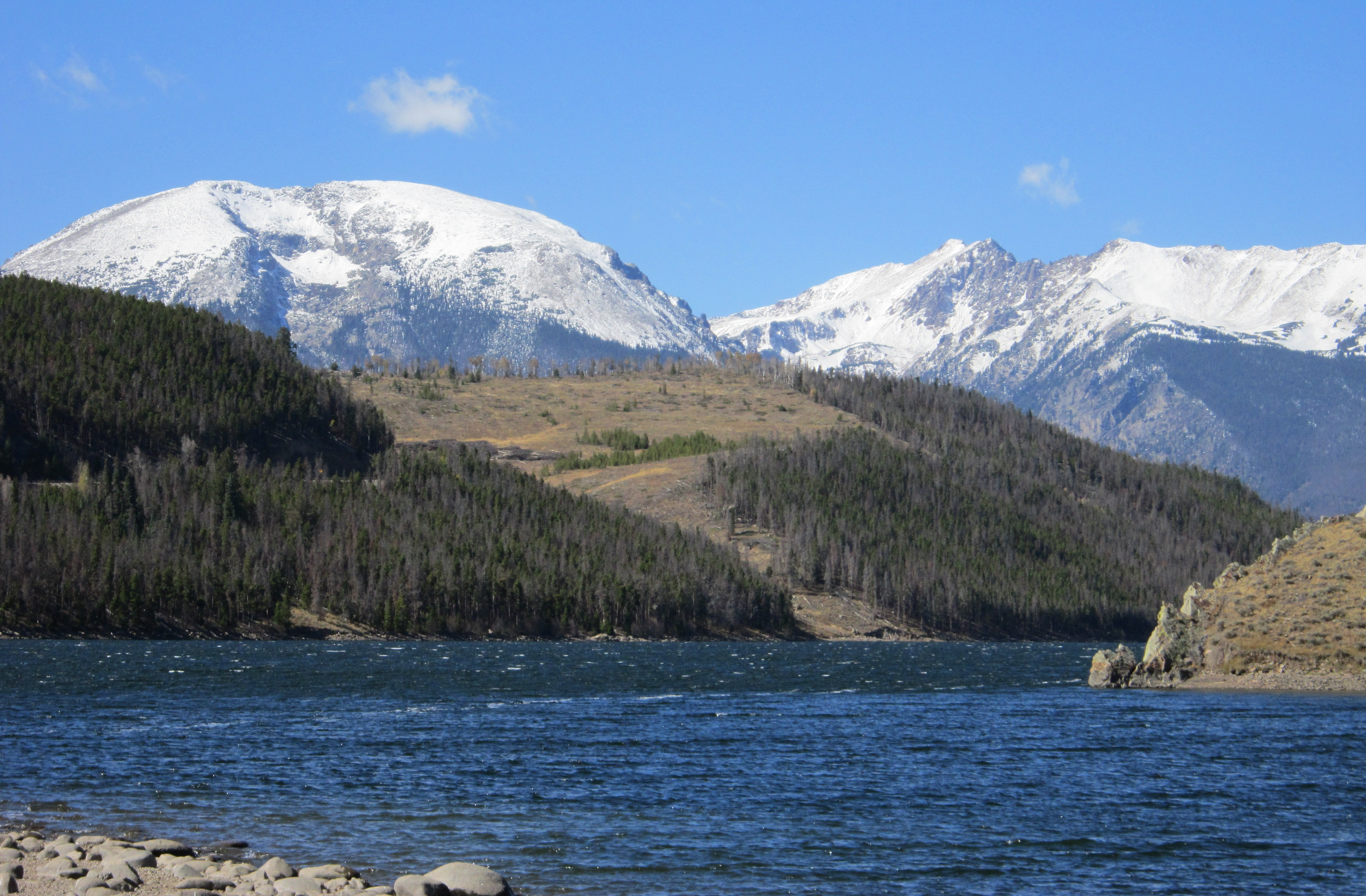
- Buffalo Mountain (left) at the southern end of the Gore Range seen from Dillon Reservoir.

Highest point
- Peak: Mount Powell
- Elevation: 13,566 ft (4,135 m)
- Listing: Mountain ranges of Colorado
- Coordinates: 39°45′36″N 106°20′27″W

Dimensions
- Length: 77 mi (124 km) N-S
- Width: 46 mi (74 km) E-W
- Area: 1,420 mi^{2} (3,700 km^{2})

Geography
- Location within Colorado
- Country: United States
- State: Colorado
- Counties: Eagle; Summit; Grand; Routt
- Parent range: Southern Rocky Mountains

The Gore Range (elevation approximately 12,000 ft) is a mountain range in the Rocky Mountains of north central Colorado in the United States. The native Ute name was the Shining Mountains.

== Geography ==
The range runs for approximately 60 miles (100 km) northwest-to-southeast, through western Grand and Summit counties, and eastern Routt and Eagle counties. They form the southern extension of the Park Range, extending southward from Rabbit Ears Pass (U.S. Highway 40) to the Eagle River and Gore Creek near Vail. The Colorado River passes through the range at Gore Canyon. The range forms part of the western boundary of Middle Park at the headwaters of the Colorado, separating it from the upper basin of the Yampa River to the west. The northern section of the range north of Gore Pass is somewhat lower than the southern section, along the western side of the valley of the Blue River. The ridges of the range are prominently visible on clear days from the summit of Trail Ridge Road in Rocky Mountain National Park approximately 50 miles (80 km) to the east. The range is traversed at its southern and southwestern lower flanks by Interstate 70 from Silverthorne to Vail. Much of the range is located within the Arapaho and White River National Forests, and large portions are protected within the Eagles Nest Wilderness.

== Geology and Topography ==
The Gore Range is a fault block mountain range, bounded on the west by the Gore fault zone, a thrust fault, and on the east by the Blue River normal fault. A half-graben created by this fault underlies the Blue River Valley and is the northernmost topographical expression of the Rio Grande rift. The rock of the Gore Range is Paleoproterozoic granite and metasedimentary gneiss and schist.

The topography of the range is predominantly the result of glacial erosion and deposition during the Pleistocene epoch, forming numerous U-shaped valleys and cirques separated by jagged, sharp ridges aka arêtes. The range has been described as more one of ridges instead of separated peaks, with summits at ridge junctions and high points. Many of the summits have a similar elevation of around 13,000 feet (4000 meters).

== History ==
The range was named for Sir St George Gore, 8th Baronet, an Irish hunter who visited the area in the 1850s on a notorious hunting expedition throughout the American West. Gore's three-year stopover in the American West had him traversing what is today the Dakotas, Montana, Wyoming and Colorado. The figures are difficult to substantiate, but Gore himself claimed to have killed more than 2,000 buffalo, 1,600 elk and deer and 100 bears for sport, with the carcasses being left to rot.

=== Green Mountain Reservoir Trail ===
Green Mountain Reservoir Trail is in the northern Gore Range, part of the Rocky Mountains in the U.S. state of Colorado. It is located among the developed campgrounds along the shore of Green Mountain Reservoir, Summit County. Green Mountain Reservoir is north of Interstate 70, west of Highway 9, north of Silverthorne and near Heeney. Green Mountain projects skyward at the north end of Green Mountain Reservoir, with an escarpment that may interest rock climbers and abandoned mines that place the area in historical context. Below the peak, the surrounding hills are high desert, covered in sagebrush. Among the sagebrush, many wildflowers bloom. Green Mountain Trail winds through sagebrush fields among the campsites on the eastern shore of Green Mountain Reservoir. Wildflowers that may be found in late spring include buttercup, mountain ball cactus, moss campion, Wyoming paintbrush Castilleja and alpine phlox.

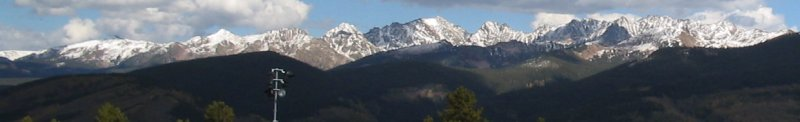
The Gore Range as seen from Vail, Colorado.
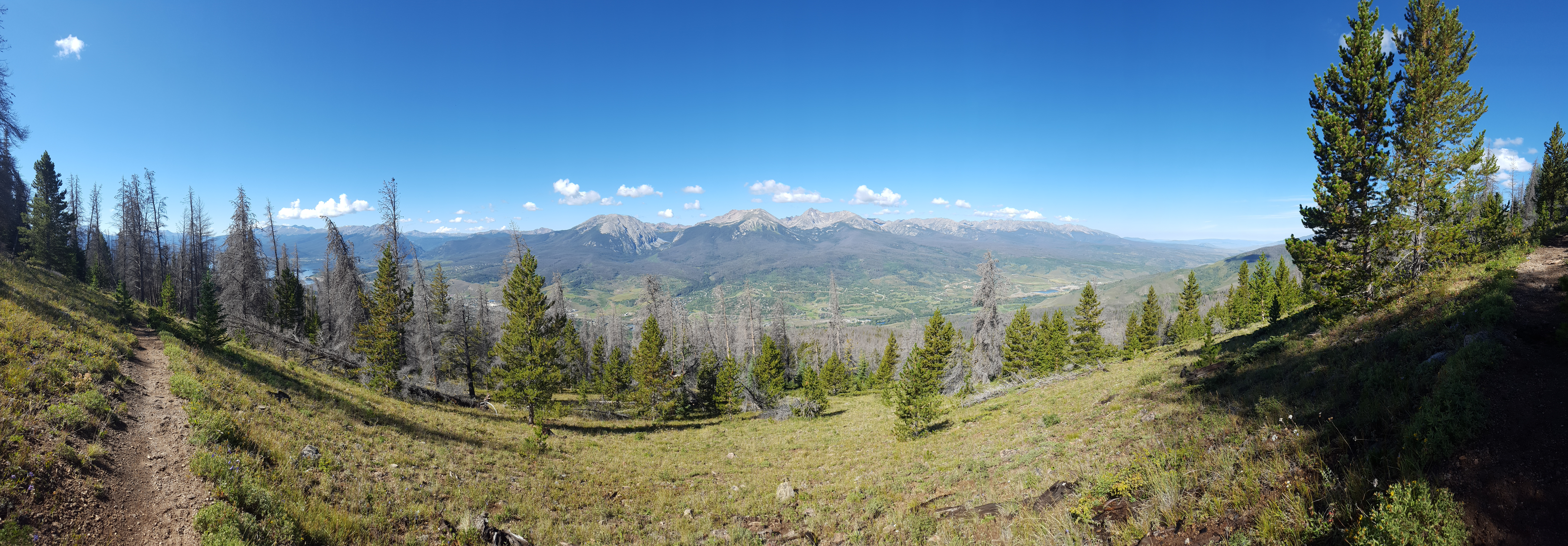
The Gore Range as seen from Ptarmigan Peak Trail
