= Grays Peak Trail =

Trail in Colorado, United States

Coordinates: 39°38′29″N 105°48′40″W

Grays Peak National Recreation Trail
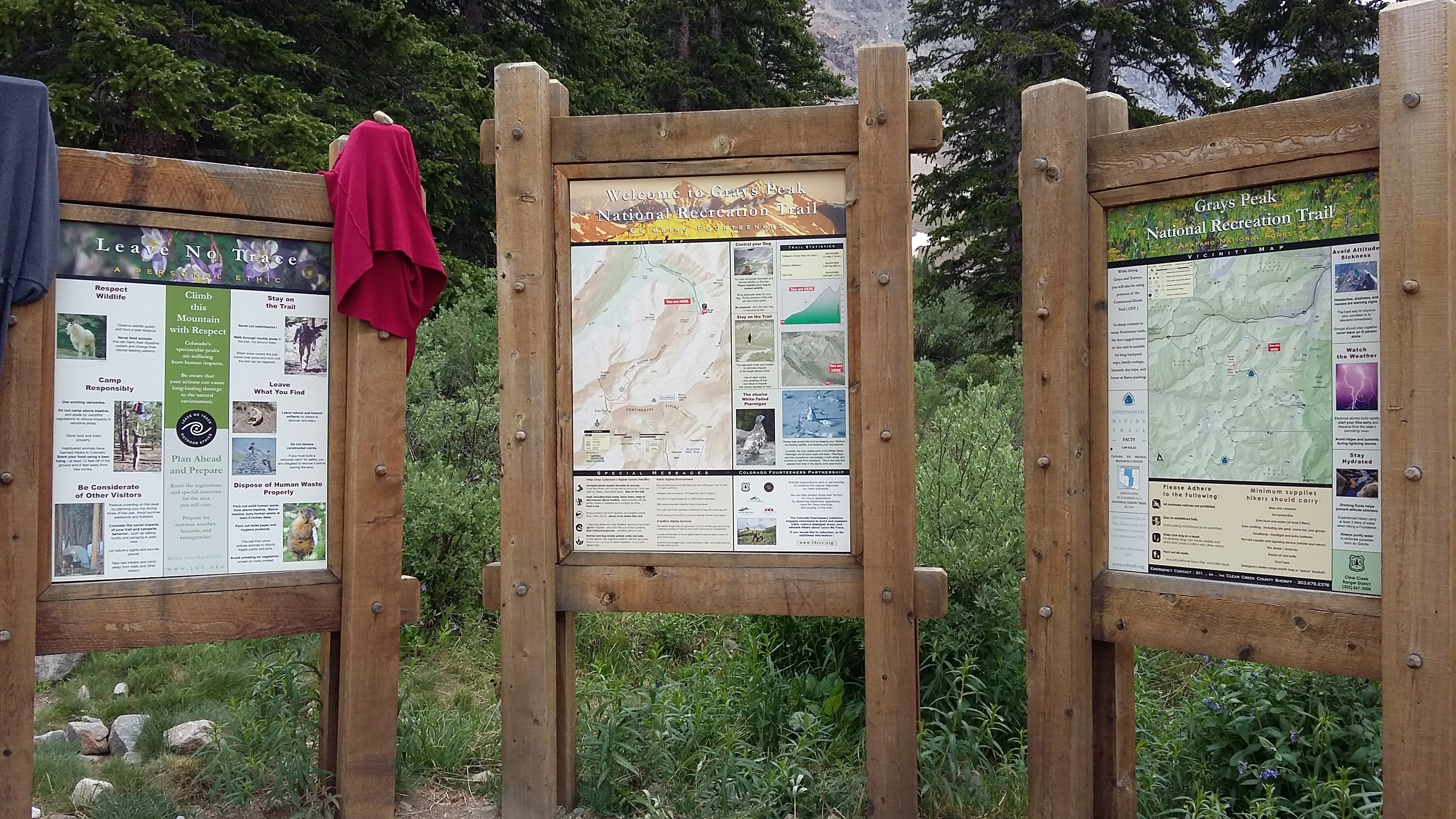
- Information signs at trailhead.
- Length: 3.4 miles (5.5 km) to Grays Peak; 4.2 miles (6.8 km) to Torreys Peak
- Location: Clear Creek County, Colorado, United States
- Designation: National Recreation Trail
- Trailheads: Grays Peak trailhead
- Use: Hiking
- Elevation gain/loss: +3,566 feet (1,087 m)/-565 feet (172 m)
- Highest point: Grays Peak summit, 14,278 ft (4,352 m)
- Lowest point: Trailhead, 11,244 feet (3,427 m)
- Grade: 20%
- Difficulty: More difficult, Most difficult
- Sights: Grays Peak; Torreys Peak; views of both sides of the Continental Divide; Mount Kelso; Mount Edwards
- Hazards: Severe Weather, Avalanche
- Surface: Rock, smooth

Grays Peak National Recreation Trail or Grays Peak Trail lies along the Continental Divide of the Americas, part of the Rocky Mountains in the U.S. state of Colorado. It is located in the White River National Forest, Summit County. Grays Peak Trail is south of Interstate 70, east of Keystone Resort and near Montezuma. Grays Peak is adjacent to Torreys Peak.

The Grays Peak Trail begins three miles (4.8 kilometers) above Interstate 70, at 11,200 feet (3,400 meters). The summit of Grays Peak is 3.7 miles (6.0 kilometers) from the trailhead. Torreys Peak is 4.15 miles (6.68 kilometers) from the trailhead, across a saddle from Grays Peak. Grays Peak Trail ascends south through the wetland willows of Stevens Gulch. The trail passes between Stevens Mine on a lower slope of McClellan Mountain, elevation 13,587 feet (4,141 meters), forming the eastern wall of the valley, and Sterling Silver Group Mine beside the trail to the right on Kelso Mountain, 13,164 feet (4,012 meters). The trail climbs 900 feet (270 meters) during the first 1.7 miles (2.7 kilometers) to a National Recreation Trail sign indicating that the summit is two miles (3.2 kilometers) farther.

From the saddle between Grays and Torreys, Stevens Gulch is within sight. The Keystone Resort slopes of Keystone Mountain, 11,641 feet (3,548 meters), North Peak, 11,661 feet (3,554 meters), and South Peak, 11,982 feet (3,652 meters), are west of Grays Peak. Grays Peak, 14,270 feet (4,350 meters), and Mount Edwards, 13,850 feet (4,220 meters), form the ridge that is the Continental Divide of the Americas east of Torreys Peak.

Wildlife in the area includes mountain goat, pika, cougar or mountain lion, mule deer, elk, marmot, coyote, ptarmigan, American red squirrel, and Canada jay. Wildflowers that bloom in the tundra area on the Continental Divide include moss campion (Silene acaulis), alpine forget-me-not (Myosotis alpestris), sky pilot (Polemonium viscosum), sea pink, old-man-of-the-mountain (Rydbergia grandiflora), and mountain gentian (Gentiana). In the Deer Creek Valley, below the tree line, the blooms of monkshood or wolfsbane, blue columbine, fireweed, and paintbrush (Castilleja) can be found.
