= Deer Creek Trail (Colorado) =

Trail in the state of Colorado

Deer Creek Trail lies along the Continental Divide of the Americas, part of the Rocky Mountains in the U.S. state of Colorado. It is located in the White River National Forest, Summit County. Deer Creek Trail is south of Colorado Highway 6, east of Keystone Resort and near Montezuma.

Wildlife in the area includes mountain goat, pika, cougar or mountain lion, mule deer, elk, marmot, coyote, ptarmigan, American red squirrel, and Canada jay. Wildflowers that bloom in the tundra area on the Continental Divide of the Americas include moss campion (Silene acaulis), alpine forget-me-not (Myosotis alpestris), sky pilot (Polemonium viscosum), sea pink, old-man-of-the-mountain (Rydbergia grandiflora), and mountain gentian (Gentiana). In the Deer Creek Valley, below the tree-line, the blooms of monkshood or wolfsbane, blue columbine, fireweed, and paintbrush (Castilleja) can be found.

The Deer Creek valley is an open willow-filled meadow surrounded by lodge pole pines and the barren rock face of Glacier Mountain along the western slope. From the base at 10,500 feet, the trail rises to about 12,200 feet at the junction with the Radical Hill Jeep Trail to the east and the Middle Fork Road to the Swan River heading west. Saints John Road crosses Glacier Mountain to the northwest, with the Gore Range forming the distant horizon.

Deer Creek Trail ascends east to the spine of Teller Mountain at 12,615 feet, joining the Continental Divide Trail. Park County lies to the south along the North Fork of the South Platte River. Red Cone, 12,801 feet, stands to the east. Webster Pass Road descends from 12,100 feet into mining ruins within Handcart Gulch, immediately west of Red Cone. The twin peaks of Grays and Torreys form the northern line of the Continental Divide at the edge of Clear Creek County.

The surrounding area is pocked with abandoned silver and gold mines from the nineteenth century. Toxins continue to poison the Snake River below Deer Creek, making portions of the stream uninhabitable by trout. The abandoned Pennsylvania Mine is being studied by the U.S. Geological Survey, the U.S. Environmental Protection Agency and the Colorado Department of Public Health and Environment. Deer Creek provides essential flows of pure water to dilute existing mine pollutants.

The Montezuma Loop Trail is a jeep road and mountain bike trail that encircles the Deer Creek Trail. The multi-use trail follows Webster Pass Road southeast from Montezuma Road. Montezuma Loop Trail passes beside the Continental Divide Trail and Deer Creek Trail. Then, the Montezuma Loop Trail descends north on Saints John Road to Montezuma, north of the Deer Creek Trail parking area. Deer Creek Trail is described in Greatest Hikes in Central Colorado: Summit and Eagle Counties, a hiking guide by Kim Fenske.
