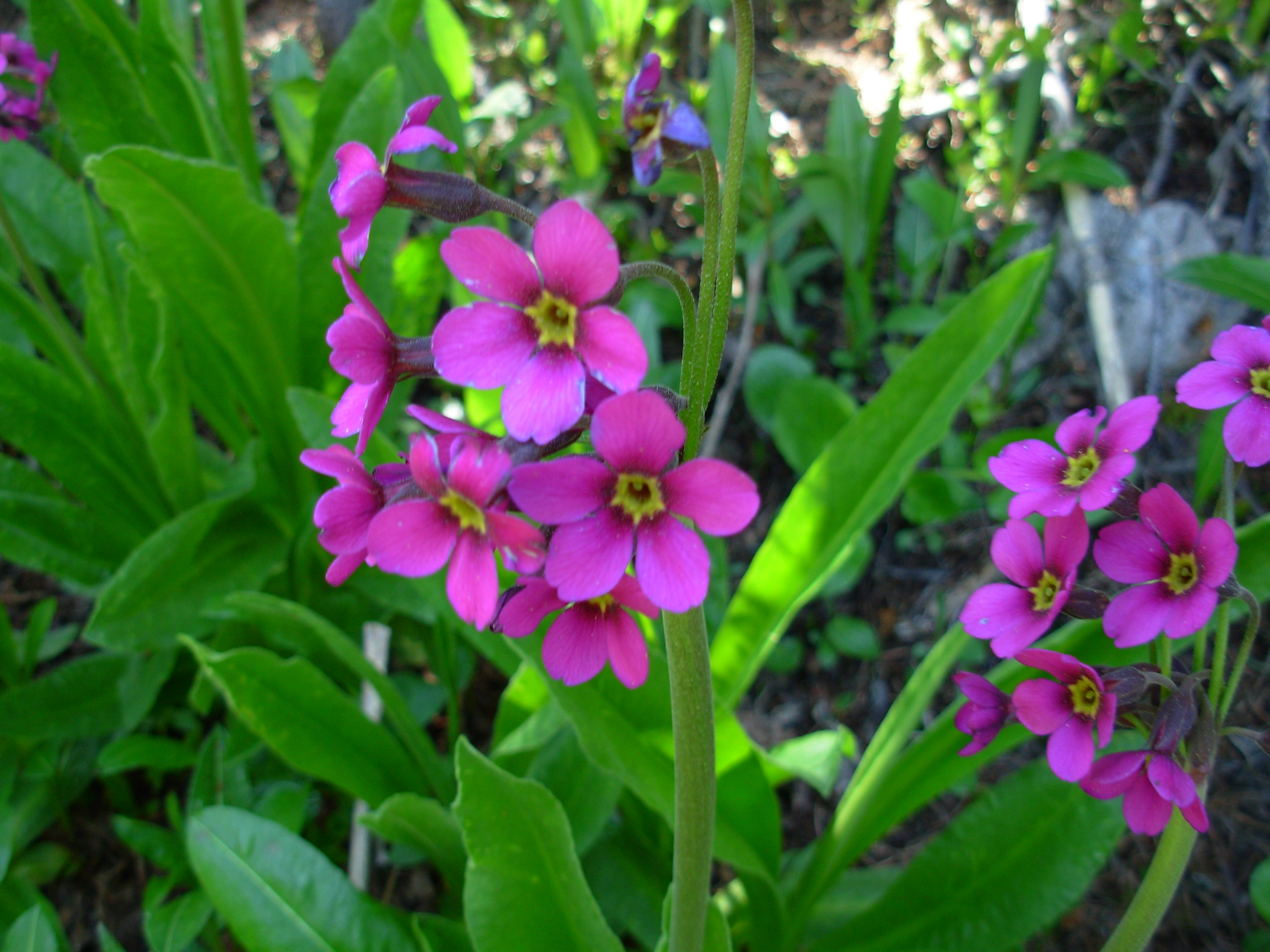

Conservation status
- Apparently Secure (NatureServe)

Scientific classification
- Kingdom: Plantae
- Clade: Tracheophytes
- Clade: Angiosperms
- Clade: Eudicots
- Clade: Asterids
- Order: Ericales
- Family: Primulaceae
- Genus: Primula
- Species: P. parryi

Binomial name
- Primula parryi A. Gray

= Primula parryi =

Species of flowering plant

Primula parryi, or Parry's primrose, is a herbaceous perennial native to wet areas from the subalpine zone to alpine tundra in the Rocky Mountains from Montana to Arizona and New Mexico.

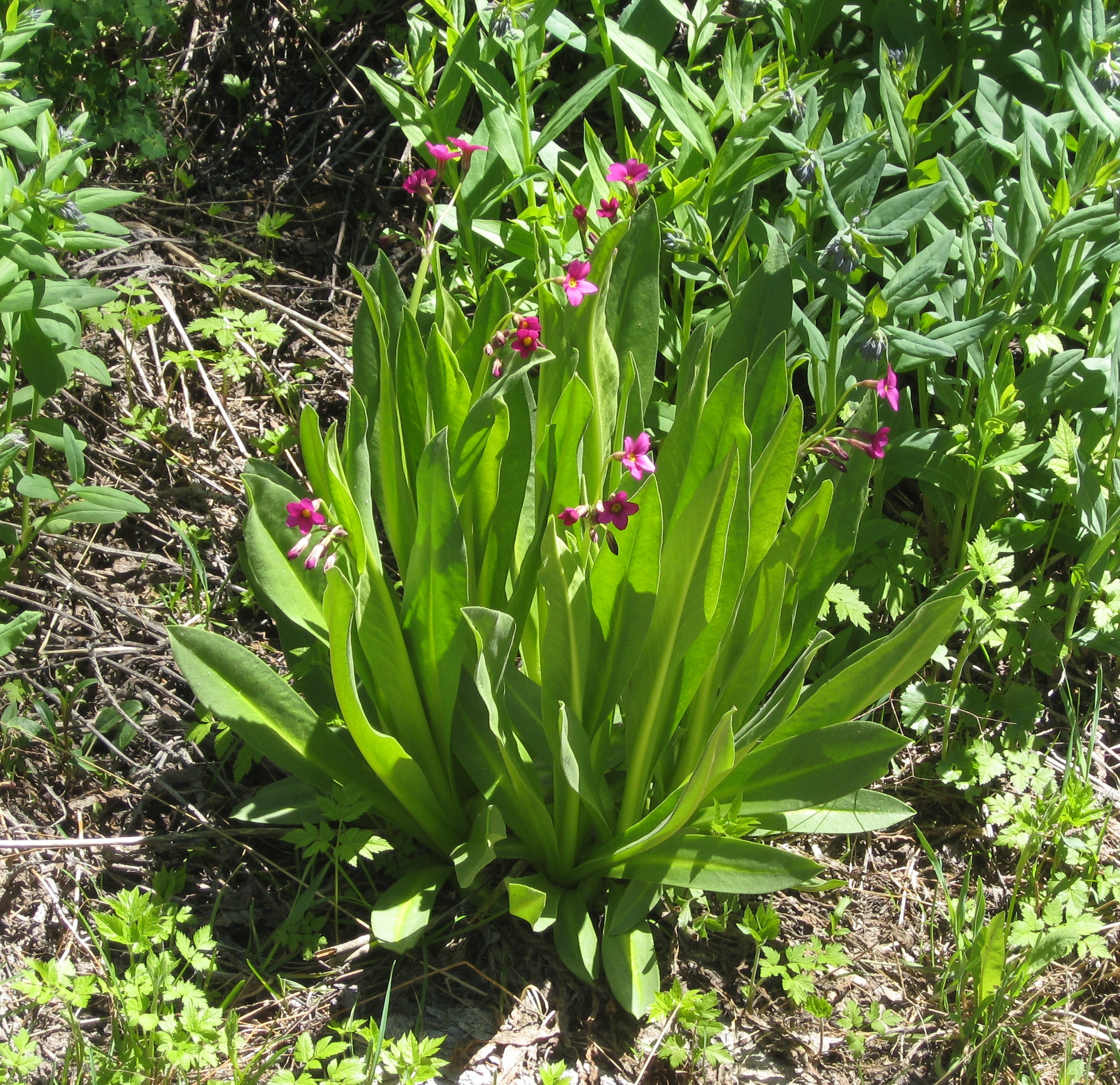
whole plant

Flowers are magenta with yellow eyes. In the high mountains, they bloom in summer; at lower elevations, in late spring.

The whole plant has a skunklike smell.

Asa Gray named Parry's primrose for Charles Christopher Parry, who discovered it in 1861. Parry had previously named Grays Peak after him.
