= Mount Edwards =

Mount Edwards may refer to:

== Antarctica ==
- Mount Edwards (Antarctica), in Marie Byrd Land, Antarctica

== Australia ==
- Mount Edwards (Queensland), a mountain
  - Mount Edwards, Queensland, the locality surrounding the mountain
  - Mount Edwards railway line, a former railway line that terminated at Mount Edwards

== United States ==
- Mount Edwards (Colorado) in Colorado, USA

See also:

- Mount King Edward
