= Charles Christopher Parry =

British-American botanist & mountain climber (1823-1890)

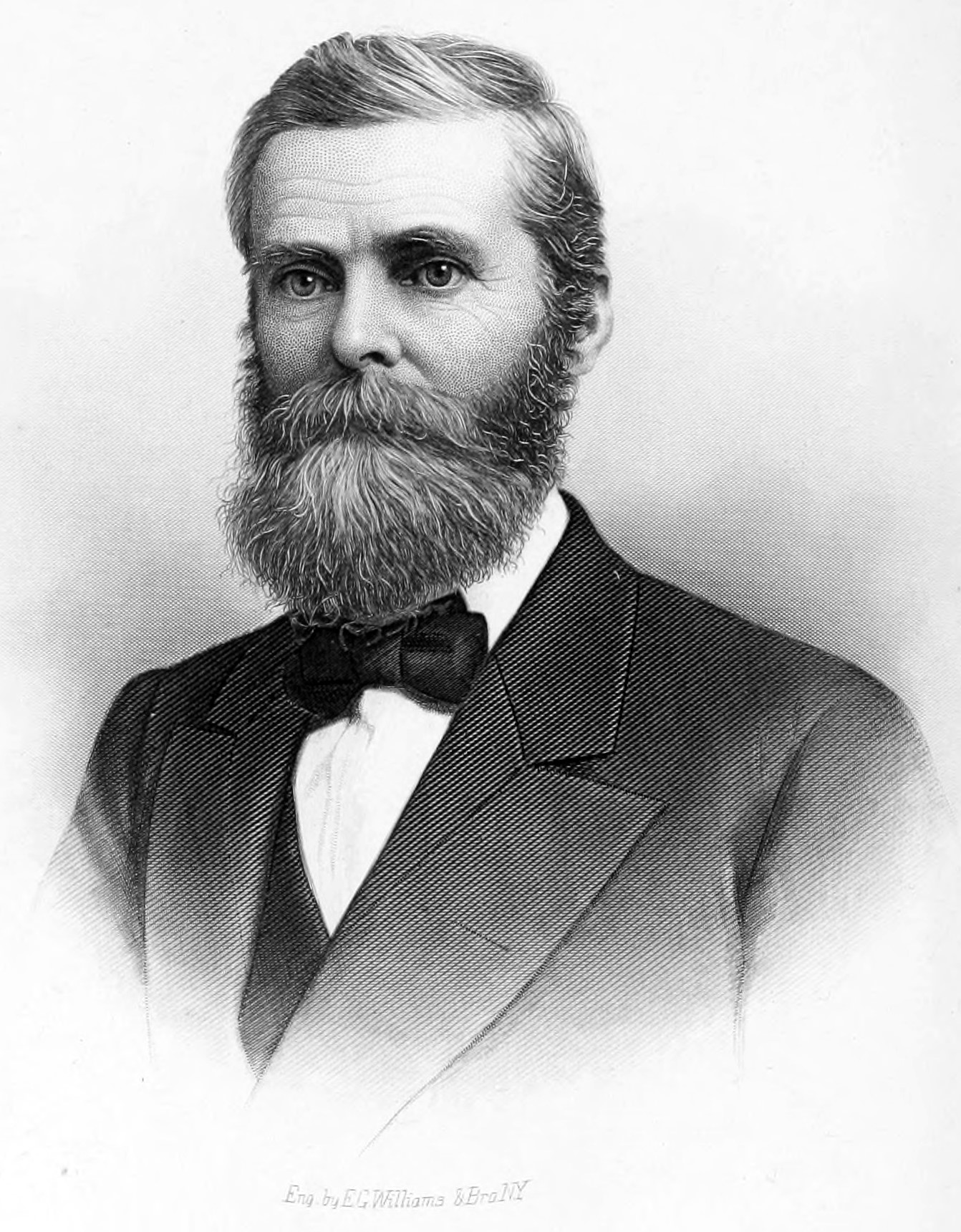
Parry circa 1875

Charles Christopher Parry (August 28, 1823 – February 20, 1890) was a British-American botanist and mountaineer.

== Biography ==
Parry was born in Gloucestershire, England, but moved to the United States with his parents in 1832, settling first in Washington County, New York. He studied medicine at Columbia University, and botany under John Torrey, Asa Gray and George Engelmann.

He moved to Davenport, Iowa in 1846 where he practiced as a doctor for a short time before joining the United States and Mexican Boundary Survey (1848–1855) as surgeon and botanist. He made extensive plant collections along the U.S.-Mexico border in California, and later in Colorado, Utah and other western states, many of which proved to be new species.

Important plants he was the first to describe include the Torrey pine and Engelmann spruce, which he named in honour of his mentors.

Dozens of plants are named after him, including the Parry Pinyon, Parry's Lily, Parry's primrose, and Parry's Penstemon. In addition, the genera Neoparrya in 1929 (Apiaceae family), and Parryella in 1868 (Fabaceae family) were also named in his honor.

Parry made the first barometric measurements of the heights of many of Colorado's mountains. Although he did not reach the summit, he estimated the height of Longs Peak, and he was the first to climb and measure Grays Peak. Parry Peak (4,082 m / 13,391 feet) in Colorado is also named after him.

His archive is held at Iowa State University.
