= White River National Forest =

National forest in northwest Colorado

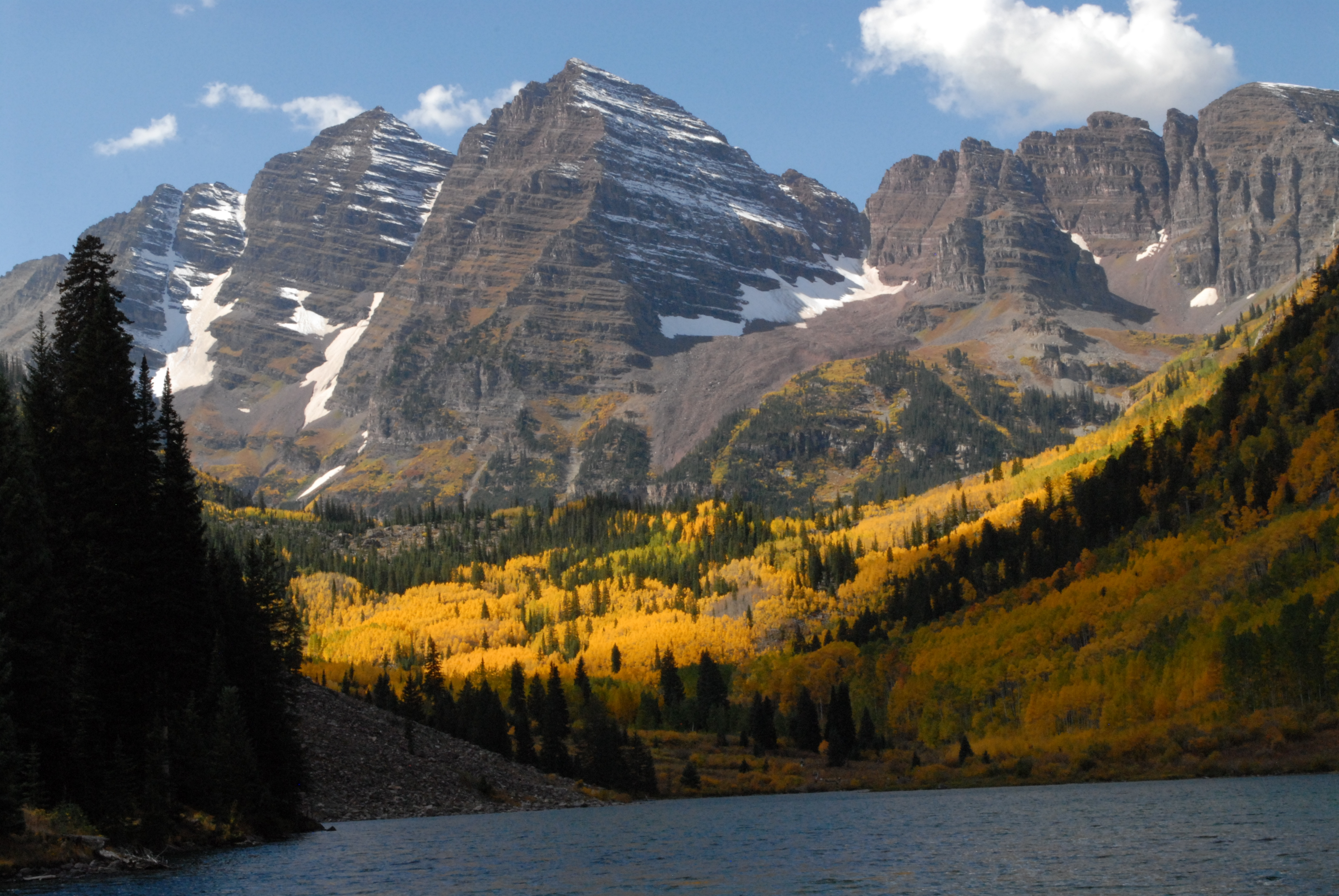
- The Maroon Bells in White River National Forest

- Location within Colorado Location within the United States
- Interactive map of White River National Forest
- Location: Colorado, United States
- Nearest city: Glenwood Springs, CO
- Coordinates: 39.589°N 105.643°W
- Area: 2,285,970 acres (9,251.0 km^{2})
- Established: June 28, 1902
- Governing body: U.S. Forest Service
- Website: White River National Forest

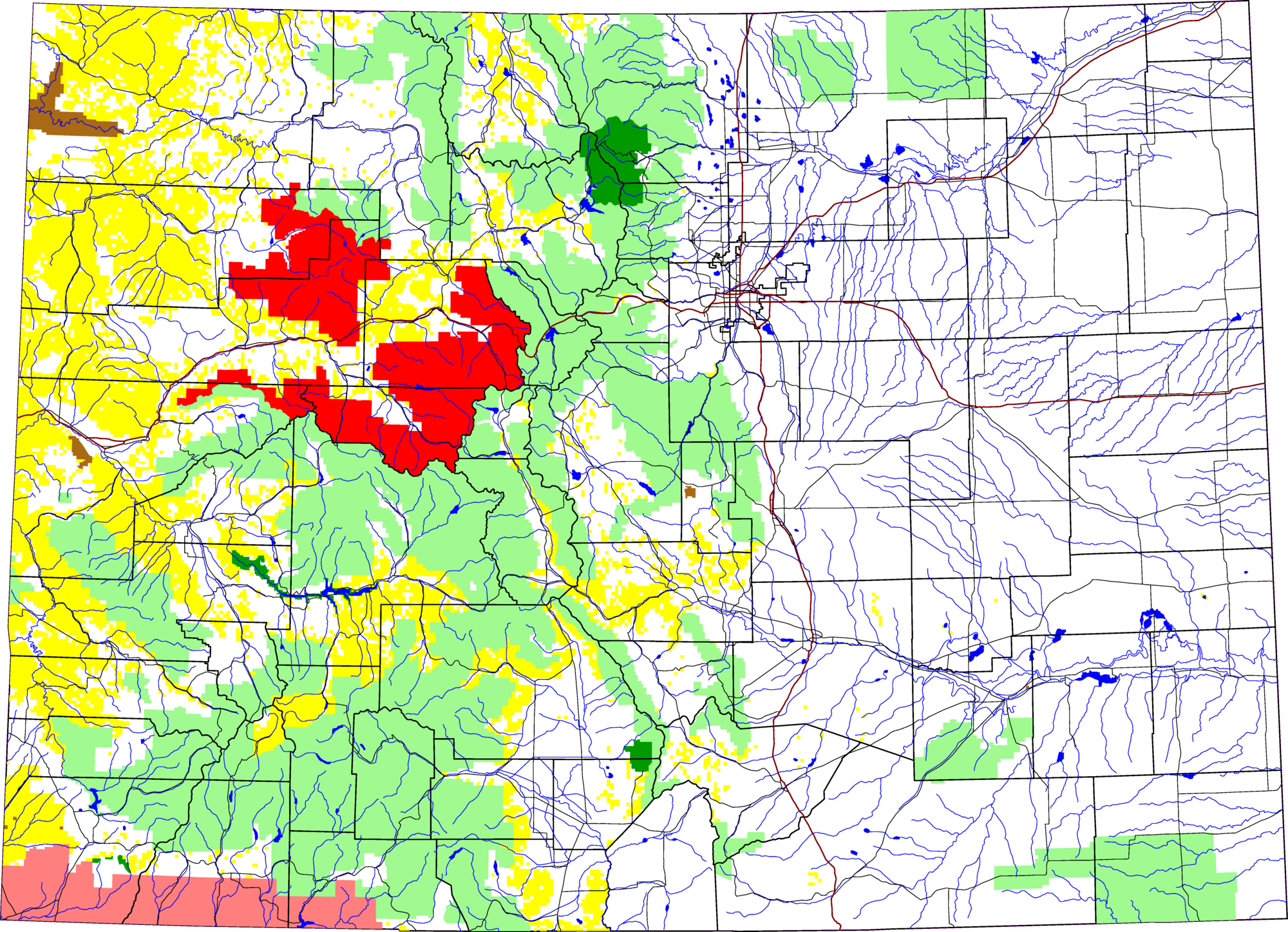
The forest highlighted in red in a map of Colorado.

White River National Forest is a National Forest in northwest Colorado. It is named after the White River that passes through its northern section. It is the most visited National Forest in the United States, primarily from users of the twelve ski areas within its boundaries.

The forest contains 2,285,970 acres (3,571.8 sq mi, or 9,250.99 km^{2}). In descending order of land area it is located in parts of Eagle, Pitkin, Garfield, Summit, Rio Blanco, Mesa, Gunnison, Routt, and Moffat counties.

The White River National Forest provides significant habitat for deer, elk, mountain sheep, mountain goat, bear, mountain lion, bobcat, lynx, moose, raptors, waterfowl, trout and many other species of wildlife.

The forest contains 1,900 mi. (3,058 km) of forest system roads, 2,500 mi (4,023 km) of trails, and the Dillon, Green Mountain, Ruedi, and Homestake reservoirs.

The forest is managed from Forest Service offices in Glenwood Springs. There are local ranger district offices in Aspen, Carbondale, Eagle, Meeker, Minturn, Rifle, and Silverthorne.

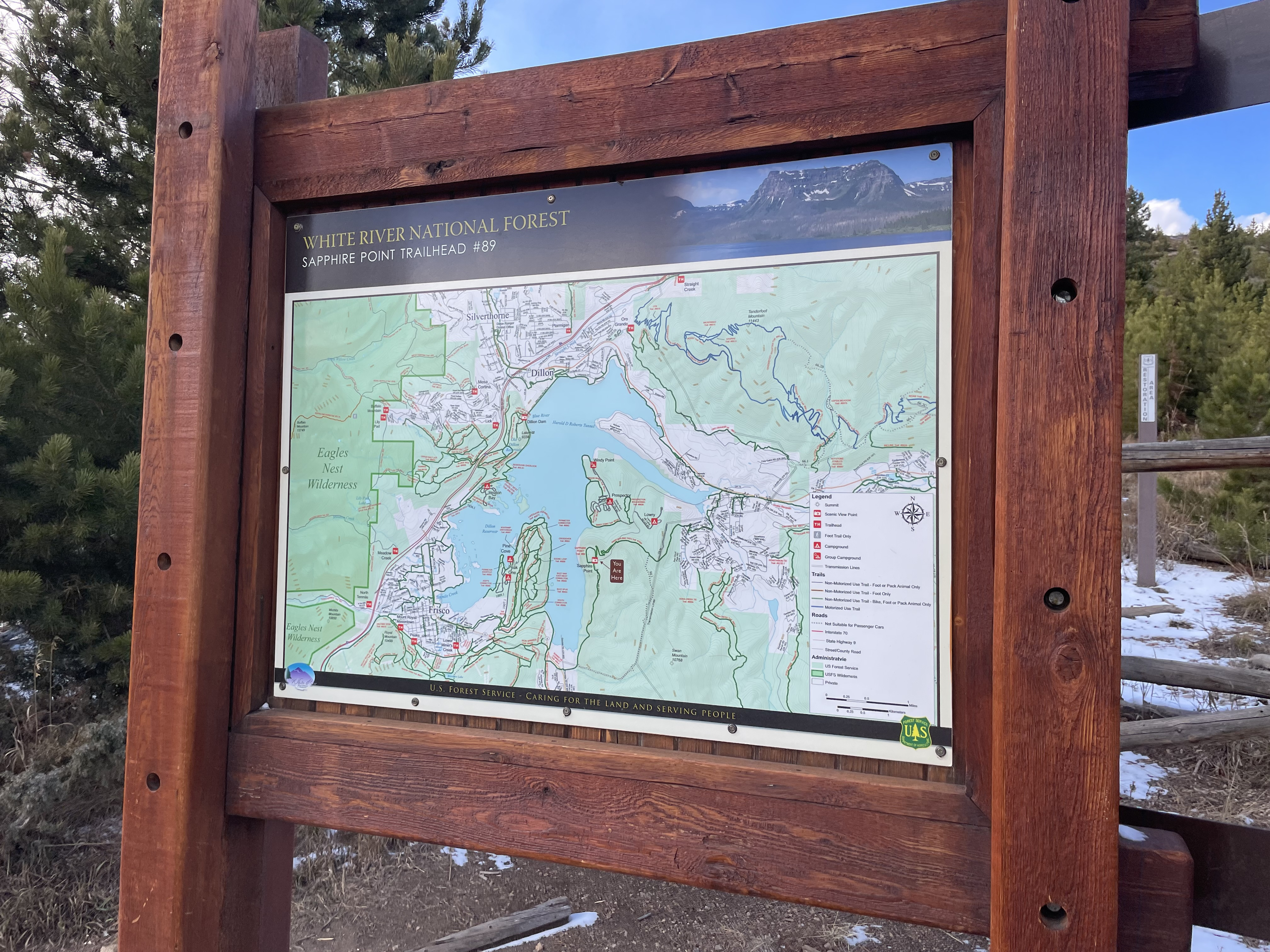
White River National Forest map sign, picture taken near the Sapphire Point

The Dillon Ranger district, run out of Silverthorne, was transferred from the Arapahoe National Forest to the White River National Forest in 1998.

== Wilderness areas ==
There are eight officially designated wilderness areas lying within White River National Forest that are part of the National Wilderness Preservation System. Five of them extend into neighboring National Forests (as indicated).

- Collegiate Peaks Wilderness (the largest part in San Isabel NF; also partly in Gunnison NF)
- Eagles Nest Wilderness
- Flat Tops Wilderness (partly in Routt NF) (considered by some accounts the birthplace of the U.S. Wilderness Area system)
- Holy Cross Wilderness (partly in San Isabel NF)
- Hunter-Fryingpan Wilderness
- Maroon Bells–Snowmass Wilderness (partly in Gunnison NF)
- Ptarmigan Peak Wilderness
- Raggeds Wilderness (mostly in Gunnison NF)

== Ski areas ==
The following ski areas are located inside the forest:

- Arapahoe Basin
- Aspen Mountain
- Aspen Highlands
- Beaver Creek
- Breckenridge
- Buttermilk
- Copper Mountain
- Ski Cooper (divided between WRNF and San Isabel National Forest)
- Keystone
- Snowmass
- Sunlight
- Vail

== Fourteeners ==
There are ten peaks with an elevation higher than 14,000 ft (4,267 m), colloquially known as 14ers in the forest:

- Castle Peak 14,279 ft (4,352 m), Maroon Bells-Snowmass Wilderness, Elk Mountains
- Grays Peak 14,278 ft (4,352 m), Front Range (bisected by White River National Forest and Arapahoe National Forest boundary)
- Torreys Peak 14,274 ft (4,351 m), Front Range (also divided between WRNF and Arapahoe National Forest)
- Quandary Peak, 14,271 ft (4,350 m) Tenmile Range
- Capitol Peak 14,137 ft (4,309 m), Maroon Bells-Snowmass Wilderness, Elk Mountains
- Maroon Peak, the higher of the two Maroon Bells summits, 14,163 ft (4,317 m), Maroon Bells-Snowmass Wilderness, Elk Mountains
- Snowmass Mountain 14,099 ft (4,297 m), Maroon Bells-Snowmass Wilderness, Elk Mountains
- Pyramid Peak 14,025 ft (4,275 m), Maroon Bells-Snowmass Wilderness, Elk Mountains
- Mount of the Holy Cross 14,011 ft (4,271 m), Holy Cross Wilderness, Sawatch Range

The following two peaks are often included in lists of the Colorado fourteeners, but do not pass the 300 ft topographic prominence metric commonly used by U.S. Mountaineers:

- North Maroon Peak, the lower of the two Maroon Bells Summits 14,019 ft (4,273 m), Maroon Bells-Snowmass Wilderness, Elk Mountains
- Conundrum Peak, a neighboring summit of Castle Peak, 14,040 ft (4279 m), Maroon Bells-Snowmass Wilderness, Elk Mountains

== See also ==
- List of national forests of the United States
- Harker Park Lake
- Hanging Lake
- Deer Creek Trail
- Snowmass Lake
