= Harker Park Lake =

Lake in Colorado, United States

- Location within Colorado Location within the United States
- Location: Rio Blanco County, Colorado
- Coordinates: 39°55′08″N 107°36′39″W
- Type: natural lake
- Basin countries: United States
- Surface elevation: 2,700 m (8,900 ft)

Harker Park Lake is located on the northwest face of Burro Mountain in Rio Blanco County, Colorado, United States. It is 7.6 kilometres (4.7 mi) south of the very small town of Buford, Colorado, and 200 kilometres (120 mi) west of the city of Boulder. The lake is in the watershed of the White River and is entirely surrounded by the White River National Forest. The headwaters for the lake extend to the top of Burro Mountain at 3,092 m (10,143 ft). Water from Harker Park Lake drains into Sterry Lake, which in turn is the source for Sawmill Creek, a tributary of the South Fork of the White River. The nearest road, New Castle Buford Road, is 1.5 kilometres (0.93 mi) west of the lake and 109 m (360 ft) lower in elevation.
