= Ptarmigan Peak Wilderness =

Wilderness area in Colorado, United States

- IUCN category Ib (wilderness area)
- Location within the United States
- Location: Summit County, Colorado, United States
- Nearest city: Dillon, CO
- Coordinates: 40°21′00″N 106°30′00″W
- Area: 12,760 acres (51.6 km^{2})
- Established: 1993
- Governing body: U.S. Forest Service

The Ptarmigan Peak Wilderness is a U.S. Wilderness Area located north of Dillion, Colorado in the Williams Fork Mountains. The 12,760-acre (51.6 km^{2}) wilderness was established in 1993 in the White River and Routt National Forests.
