= Torreys Peak =

Mountain in the state of Colorado, United States

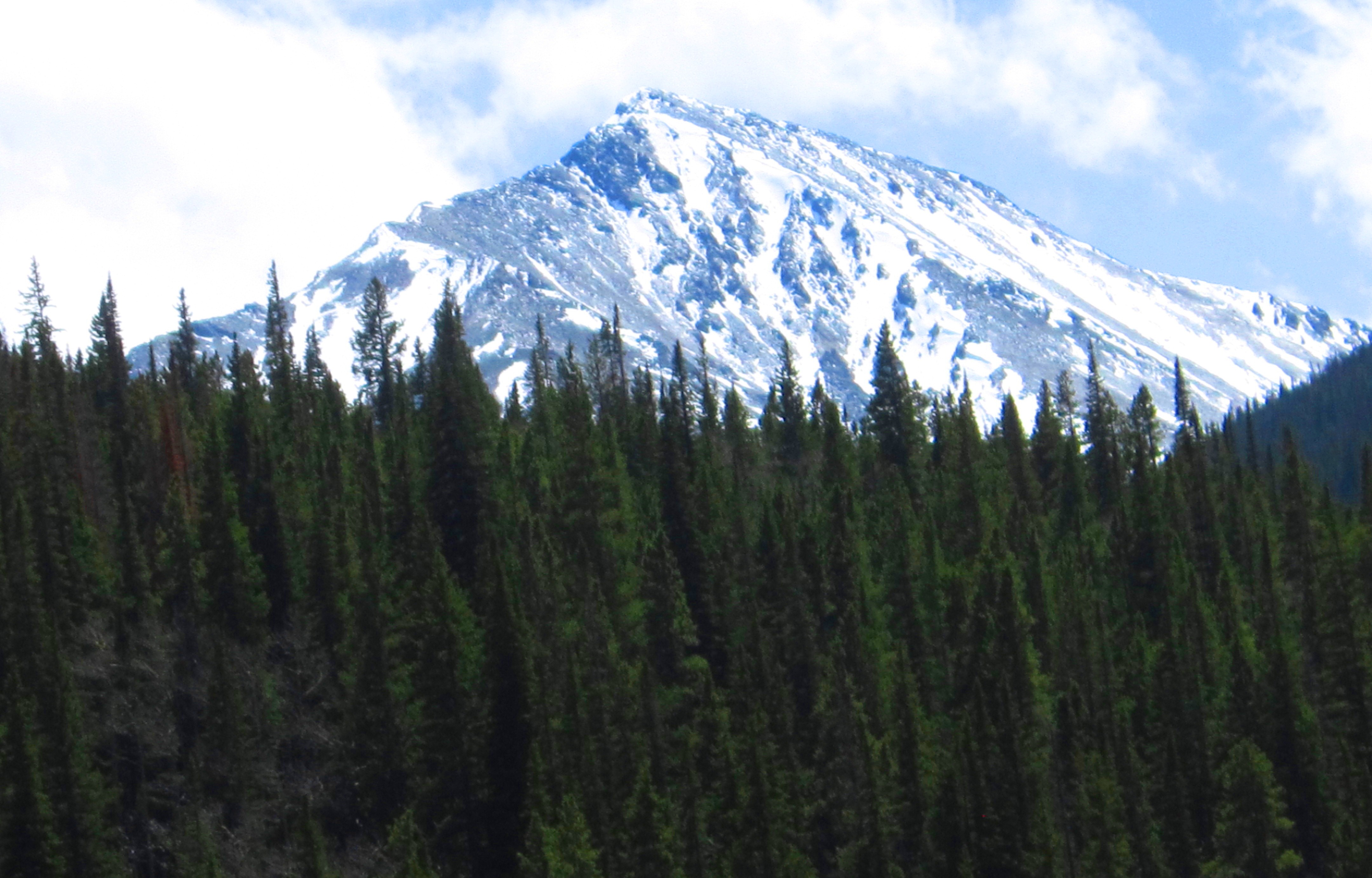
- Torreys Peak seen from I-70

Highest point
- Elevation: 14,267 ft (4,349 m)
- Prominence: 560 ft (171 m)
- Isolation: 0.65 mi (1.05 km)
- Listing: Colorado Fourteener 12th
- Coordinates: 39°38′34″N 105°49′16″W

Naming
- Etymology: John Torrey

Geography
- Location within Colorado
- Location: Continental Divide between Clear Creek and Summit counties, Colorado, United States
- Parent range: Front Range
- Topo map(s): USGS 7.5' topographic map Grays Peak, Colorado

Climbing
- First ascent: 1861 by Charles C. Parry
- Easiest route: South Slopes: Hike, class 1

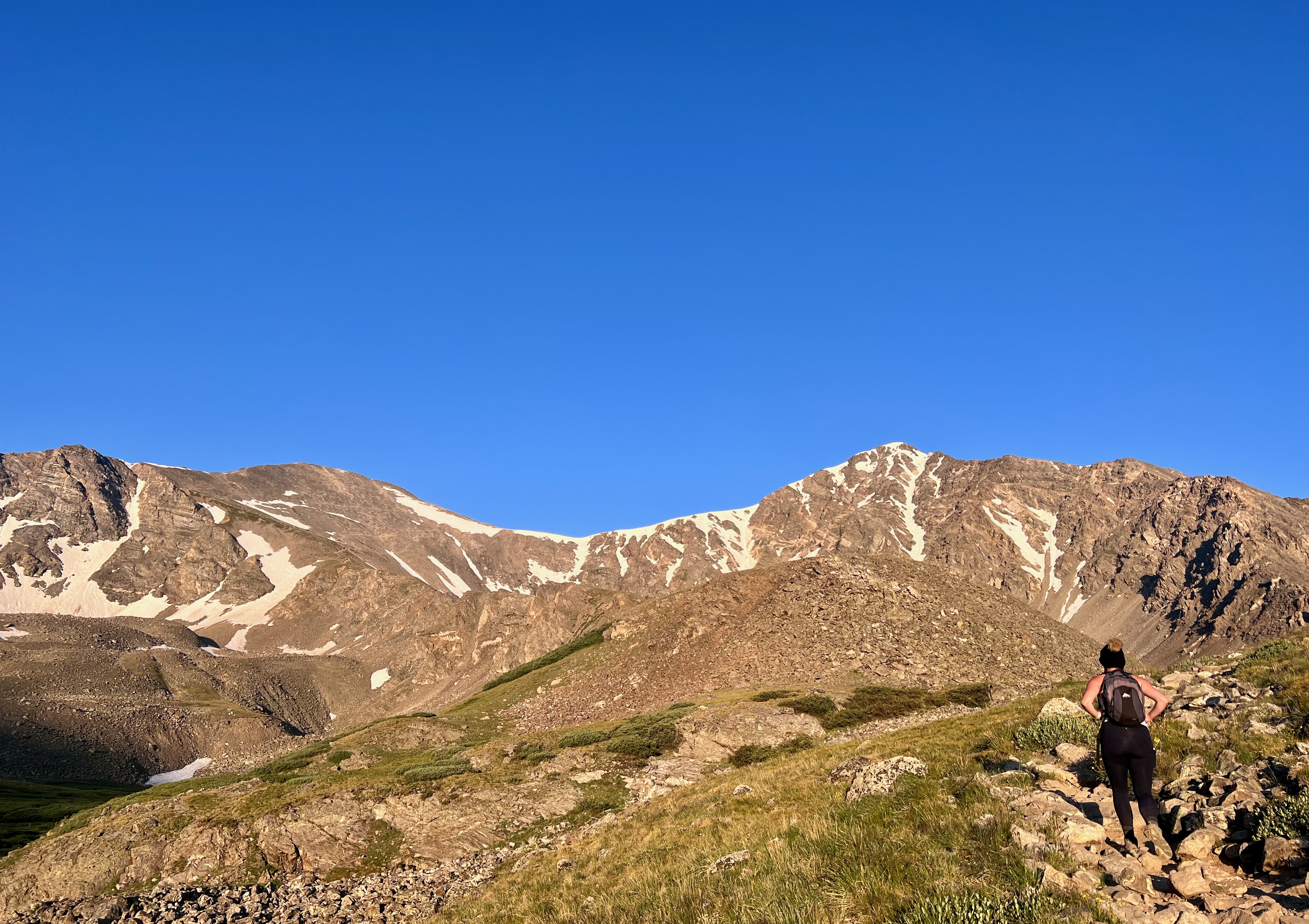
Grays and Torreys Peaks from the trail

Torreys Peak is a mountain in the Front Range region of the Rocky Mountains in Colorado. It is one of 53 fourteeners in Colorado. Its nearest major city is Denver. Torreys Peak is located along the Continental Divide, as well as the division between Clear Creek County and Summit County. In the Arapaho language Torrey's Peak and the adjacent Gray's Peak are named, Heeniiyoowuu or "Ant Hills".

== Name ==
The first European to ascend Torreys Peak, botanist Charles C. Parry, named the peak for his botanist colleague John Torrey. Torrey actually did not see the peak until 1872, 11 years later (the year before his death at the age 76). It is nearly always mentioned in conjunction with nearby Grays Peak.

== Hiking ==
There are three main trails used to reach the summit. The first is actually a continuation of Grays Peak Trail to the summit of Grays Peak, which starts in Stevens Gulch. See the Grays Peak article for more information on accessing that trail.

A popular and challenging variation of this trail follows class-3 Kelso Ridge. This route splits from the Grays Peak trail 2 miles (3.2 km) from the trailhead, climbs to the 12,400-foot (3,800 m) saddle between Torreys and 13,164-foot (4,012 m) Kelso Mountain, then follows the rugged ridge about 1 mile (1.6 km) to the summit.

The third trail starts at Loveland Pass about 4.5 miles (7.2 km) to the northwest. To reach Loveland Pass, follow I-70 west from Denver 55 miles (89 km) to where US Route 6 breaks off and heads south. Follow the meandering Route 6 approximately seven miles to the trailhead at Loveland Pass, at an elevation of 11,990 feet (3,650 m). The steepest part of the trail actually begins right away with a half mile climb of 1,000 feet (300 m). The trail follows the Continental Divide gently taking the climber down into three saddles and up two more peaks, including Grizzly Peak at 13,427 feet (4,093 m) and Mount Sniktau at 13,234 feet (4,034 m). The final saddle rests at approximately 12,600 ft. From this saddle, it is a mile-long ascent of 1,800 feet (550 m) to the final summit.

Once at the summit, many opt to continue on to Grays Peak, 0.75 miles (1.21 km) away. The trail from Torreys Peak to Grays Peak dips down to a 13,707-foot (4,178 m) saddle and then climbs back up to 14,270 feet (4,350 m).

== See also ==
- List of mountain peaks of Colorado
  - List of Colorado fourteeners
