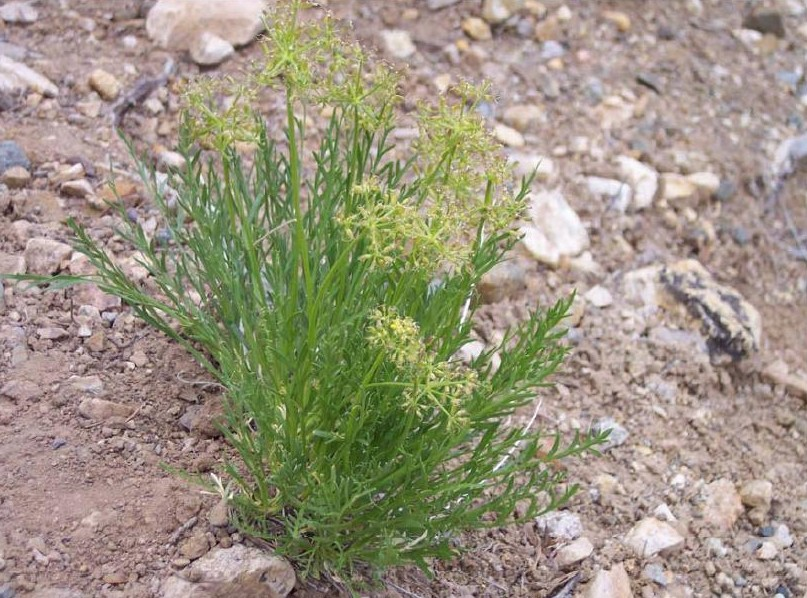

Conservation status
- Vulnerable (NatureServe)

Scientific classification
- Kingdom: Plantae
- Clade: Tracheophytes
- Clade: Angiosperms
- Clade: Eudicots
- Clade: Asterids
- Order: Apiales
- Family: Apiaceae
- Subfamily: Apioideae
- Tribe: Selineae
- Genus: Neoparrya; Mathias
- Species: N. lithophila

Binomial name
- Neoparrya lithophila Mathias

Synonyms
- Aletes lithophila (Mathias) W.Weber

= Neoparrya =

Species of flowering plant

Neoparrya is a monotypic genus of flowering plant in the carrot family Apiaceae. Its only species is Neoparrya lithophila, also known by the common names Bill's neoparrya and rock-loving aletes. It is native to Colorado and New Mexico.

This perennial plant produces a clump of herbage up to 29 or 30 centimetres (11 or 12 inches) tall. Its leaves are green, rigid, and glossy, measuring are up to 11.5 cm (4.5 in) long and divided into segments up to 3.2 cm (1.3 in) in length. The inflorescence is an umbel with up to 10 reflexed rays bearing yellow flowers. The fruit has scattered oil tubes, a characteristic that helps distinguish this plant from related species. When crushed, the fruits smell like "fresh peaches".

Endemic to the southern Rocky Mountains in the United States, this plant is known from seven counties in Colorado; it may also occur in northern New Mexico. Its population has been estimated at 48,680 to 58,490 individual plants.

This plant grows mainly on volcanic soils. It can be found on dikes, lava flows, and tuff outcrops. It also grows on sedimentary rock. It can often be found in rock cracks on steep slopes and cliff faces. It is a very dry habitat, usually with full sun exposure. Though there are generally few other plants in the habitat, associated species may include Pinus edulis, P. ponderosa, Pseudotsuga menziesii, Rhus trilobata, Cercocarpus montanus, Ribes cereum, Eriogonum jamesii, Opuntia polyacantha, Echinocereus triglochidiatus, Heterotheca villosa, and Yucca glauca. Grass species in the area include Koeleria macrantha, Chondrosum gracile, Oryzopsis micrantha, O. hymenoides, Muhlenbergia filiculmis, Stipa scribneri, and Festuca species. A number of lichens also grow in the habitat.

The main threat to this species is off-road vehicle use. This has caused habitat fragmentation at least once. Potential threats include other recreational activities and grazing. Most occurrences of the plant are relatively safe from most threats because they grow on steep, inaccessible slopes and cliff sides.
