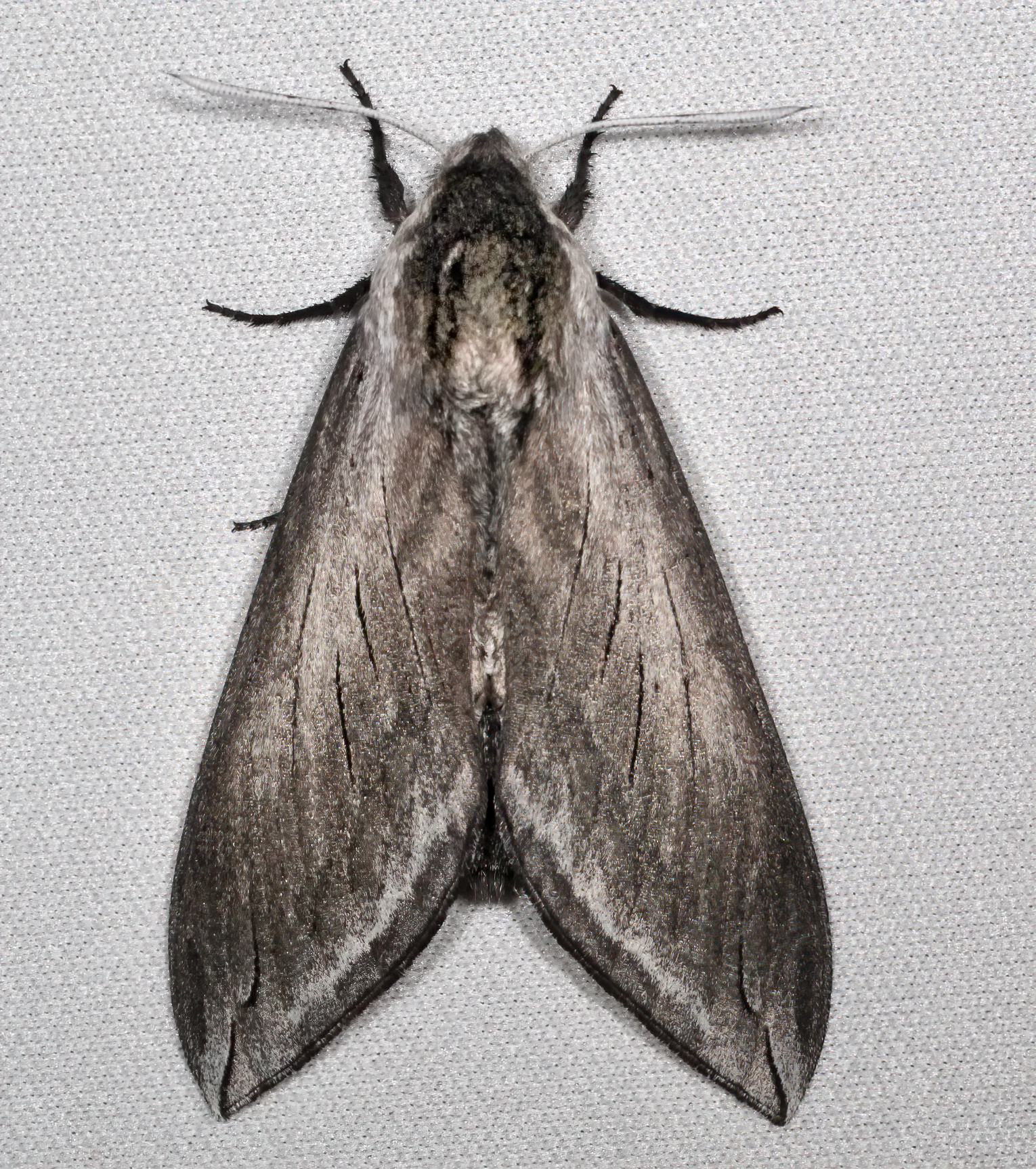
- Adult S. perelegans photographed in Contra Costa County, California
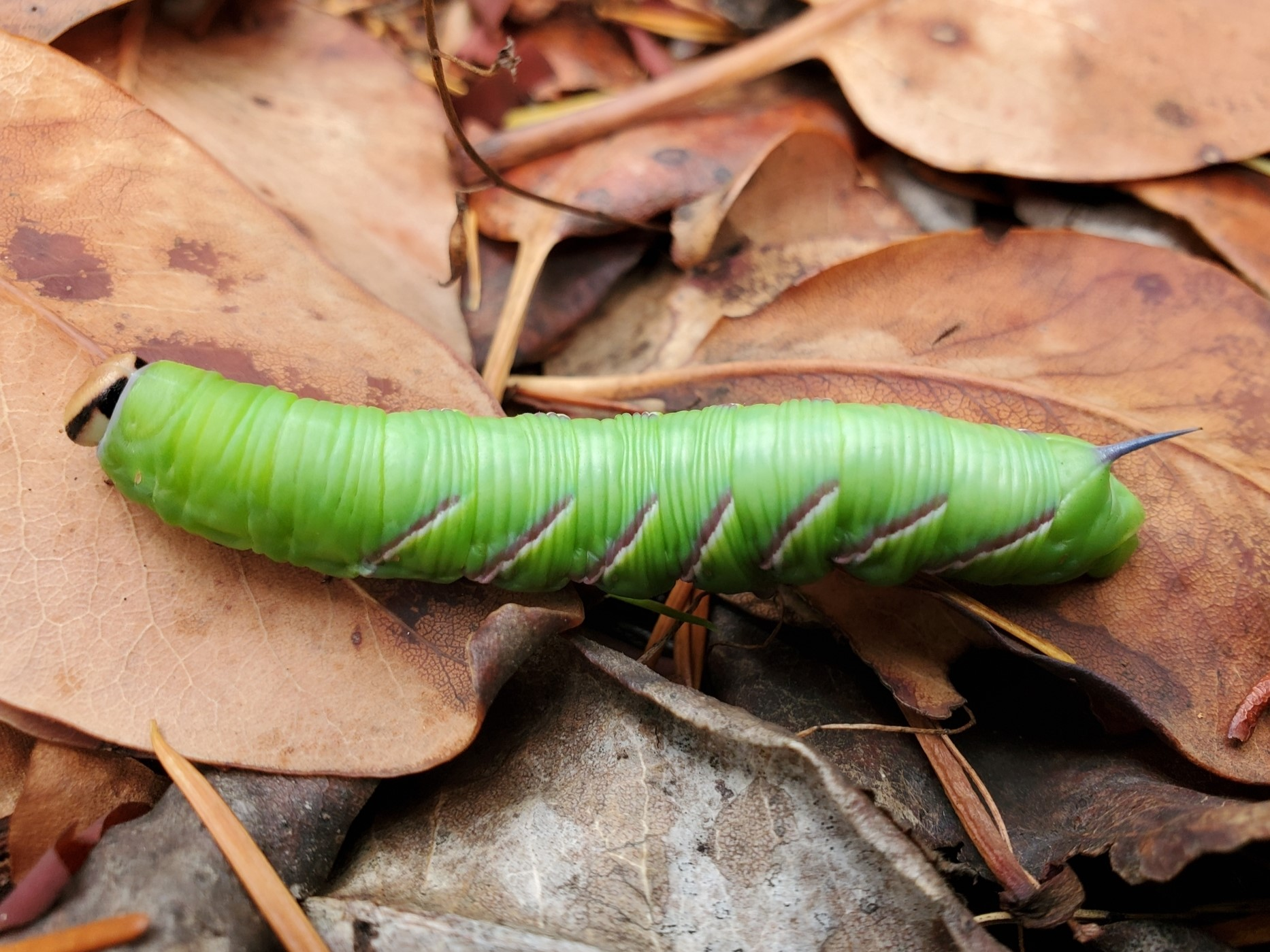
- S. perelegans caterpillar photographed in British Columbia, Canada

Conservation status
- Secure (NatureServe)

Scientific classification
- Kingdom: Animalia
- Phylum: Arthropoda
- Class: Insecta
- Order: Lepidoptera
- Family: Sphingidae
- Genus: Sphinx
- Species: S. perelegans

Binomial name
- Sphinx perelegans Edwards, 1874

Synonyms
- Sphinx vancouverensis Edwards, 1874

= Sphinx perelegans =

Species of insect

Sphinx perelegans, commonly known as the elegant sphinx, is a species of hawkmoth described by Henry Edwards in 1874. It is a large gray moth native to western North America.

== Distribution and habitat ==
Sphinx perelegans is native to the western coast of North America, from British Columbia in Canada to Baja California Sur in Mexico. In the United States, it can be found in Arizona, California, Colorado, Idaho, Montana, New Mexico, Oregon, and Washington.

West of the Cascades, S. perelegans can be found in low elevation brushland and oak woodland, while at higher elevations of the Cascades and the Siskiyou Mountains it inhabits mixed hardwood-conifer forests. It can be found in hardwood-conifer forests and juniper-hardwoord woodlands at middle elevations around the Rocky Mountains and Blue Mountains.

== Description ==
Adult Sphinx perelegans are large moths with a wingspan of 9–11 cm (3.5–4.3 in), each forewing measuring 43–50 mm (1.7–2.0 in) in length. The forewings are dark gray with a diffuse pale gray patch that stretches from the base to the center of the wing and a pale gray line bordering the subterminal margin. The middle of the forewing is marked with several longitudinal black lines. The hindwings are gray to black with white bands, with dark gray and white checkering on the fringes. The antennae are light gray. The thorax and top of the head are dark gray, with lighter gray on the sides of the thorax near the base of the wings and on the sides of the head. The top of the abdomen is dark gray with black and white stripes on each segment.

The eggs are ovoid, glossy green in colour but becoming paler as the egg develops. They are usually laid singly, sometimes in groups of two or three, on the underside of the host plants leaves. Newly hatched larvae are pale yellow, measuring up to 5 mm (0.20 in), with a long dark horn. The larvae turn pale green as they feed, ultimately growing to 70–75 mm (2.8–3.0 in) long. As they mature, the larvae develop a series of oblique white stripes edged with purple down their sides, and the horn turns blue. When mature and ready to pupate, the larvae create a sparsely silk lined chamber in the soil up to 10 cm (3.9 in) deep. The pupae are brown and measure 45–47 mm (1.8–1.9 in) long.

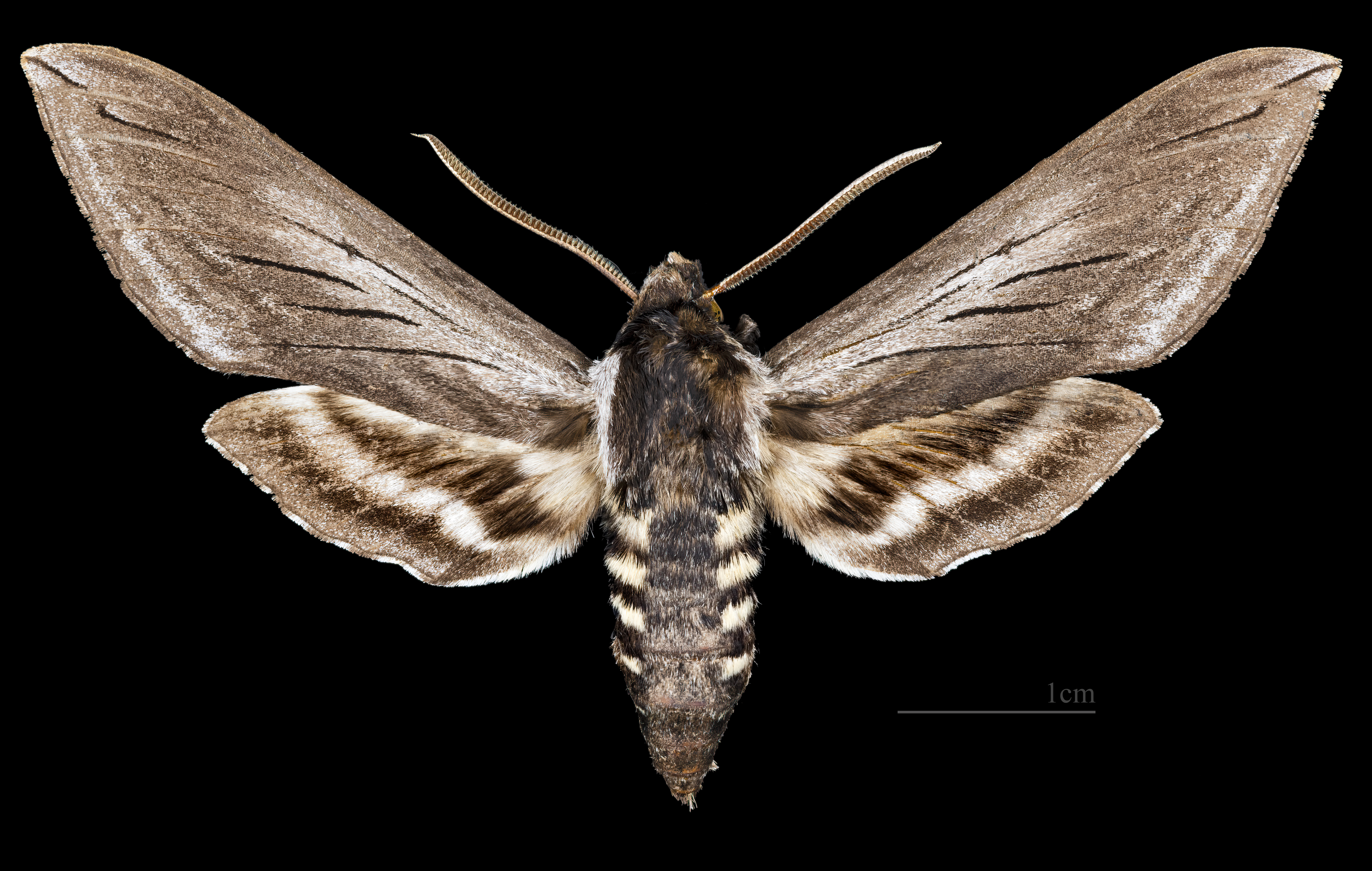
Adult male S. perelegans, dorsal view

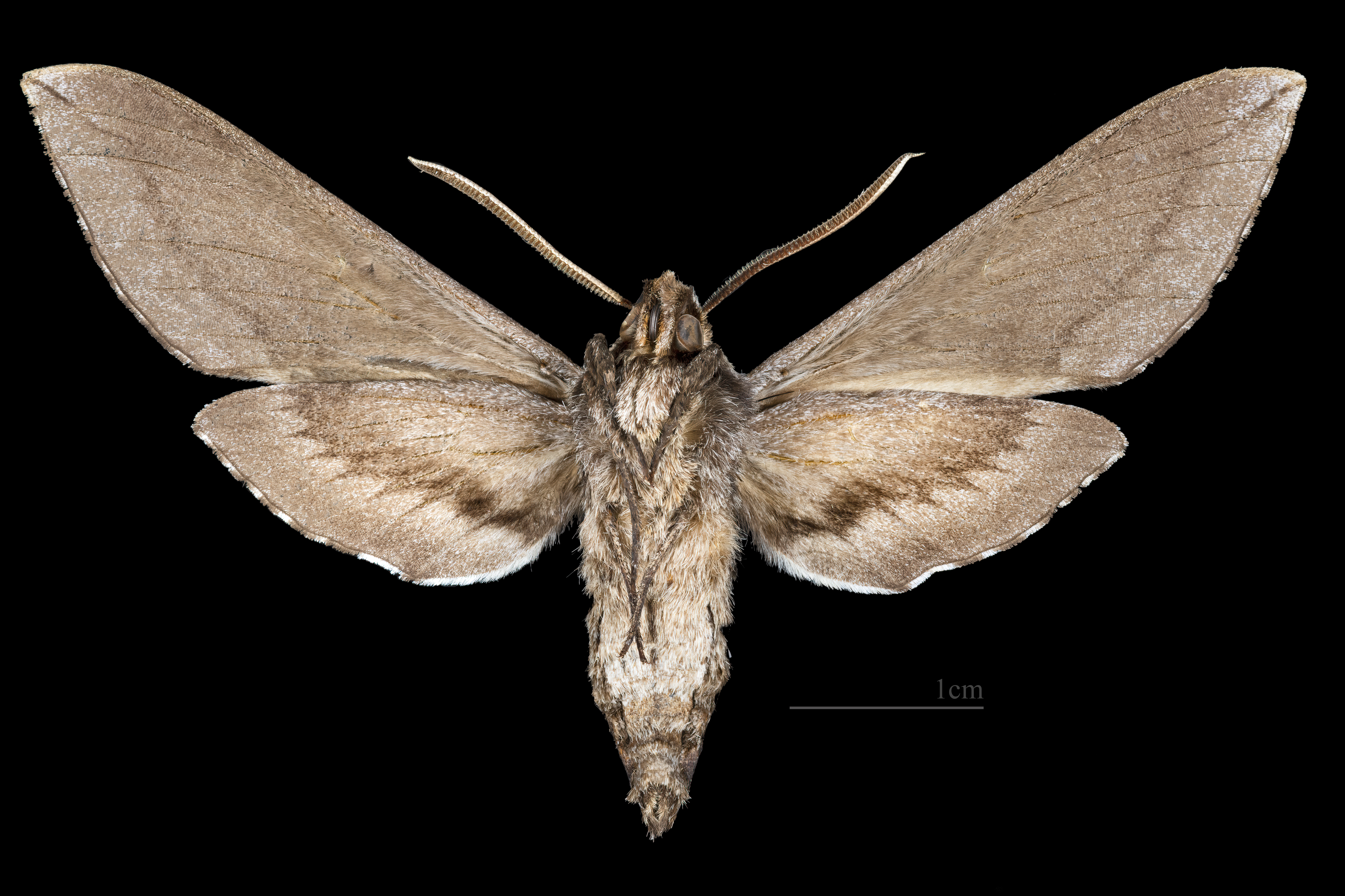
Adult male S. perelegans, ventral view

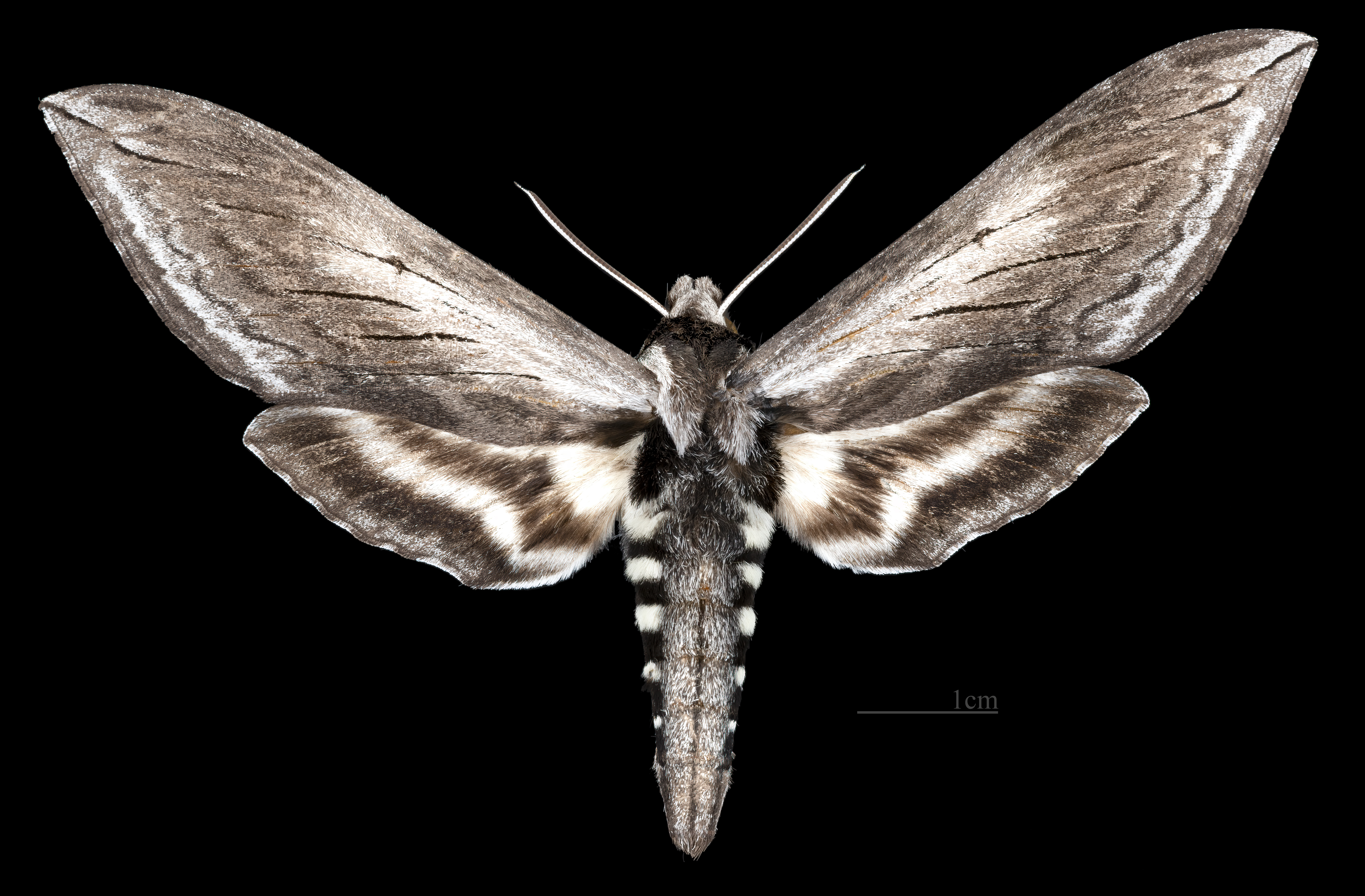
Adult female S. perelegans, dorsal view

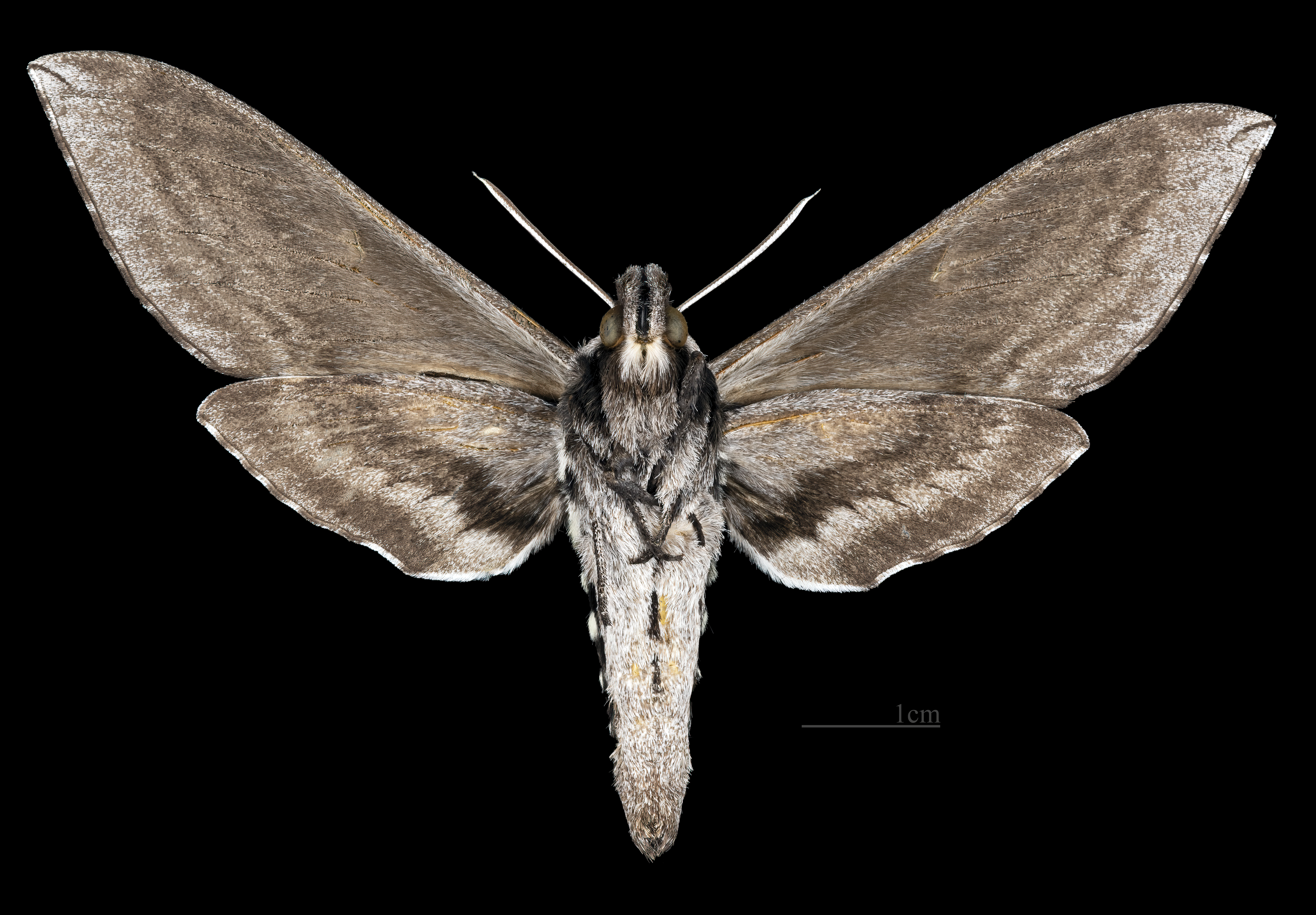
Adult female S. perelegans, ventral view

== Biology ==
Adult Sphinx perelegans are active on the wing from April to September. They are nocturnal and attracted to light. They sometimes feed on the nectar of Oenothera and Rhododendron flowers.

S. perelegans larvae can be found on a wide range of host plants, including species of Arctostaphylos, Prunus, and Symphoricarpos, as well as Arbutus menziesii and Cercocarpus betuloides. In captivity, they also feed on Gaultheria shallon, Arbutus unedo, and some species of Salix.
