= John Torrey =

American botanist (1796–1873)

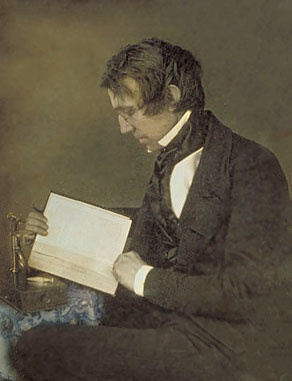
- Daguerreotype of John Torrey, 1840
- Born: August 15, 1796; New York City, New York
- Died: March 10, 1873 (aged 76); New York City, New York
- Education: Columbia University College of Physicians and Surgeons
- Awards: United States Assay Commission Medal of 1874
- Scientific career
- Fields: Botany; Medicine; Chemistry
- Author abbrev. (botany): Torr.

Signature
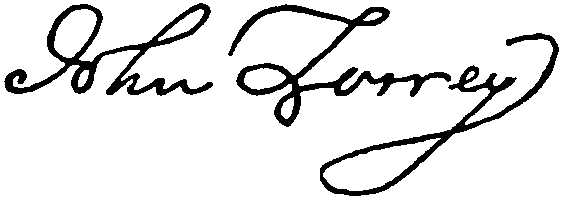

John Torrey (August 15, 1796 – March 10, 1873) was an American botanist, chemist, and medical doctor. Throughout much of his career, he was a teacher of chemistry, often at multiple universities, while he also pursued botanical work, focusing on the flora of North America. His most renowned works include studies of the New York flora, the Mexican Boundary, the Pacific railroad surveys, and the uncompleted Flora of North America.

== Biography ==
Torrey was born in New York City in 1796, the second child of Capt. William and Margaret (née Nichols) Torrey. He showed a fondness for mechanics, and at one time planned to become a machinist. When he was 15 or 16, his father received an appointment to the state prison at Greenwich Village, New York, where he was tutored by Amos Eaton, then a prisoner and later a pioneer of natural history studies in America. He thus learned the elements of botany and something of mineralogy and chemistry. In 1815 he began studying medicine with Wright Post, and qualified in 1818. He opened a medical practice in New York City, while devoting his leisure to botany and other scientific pursuits.

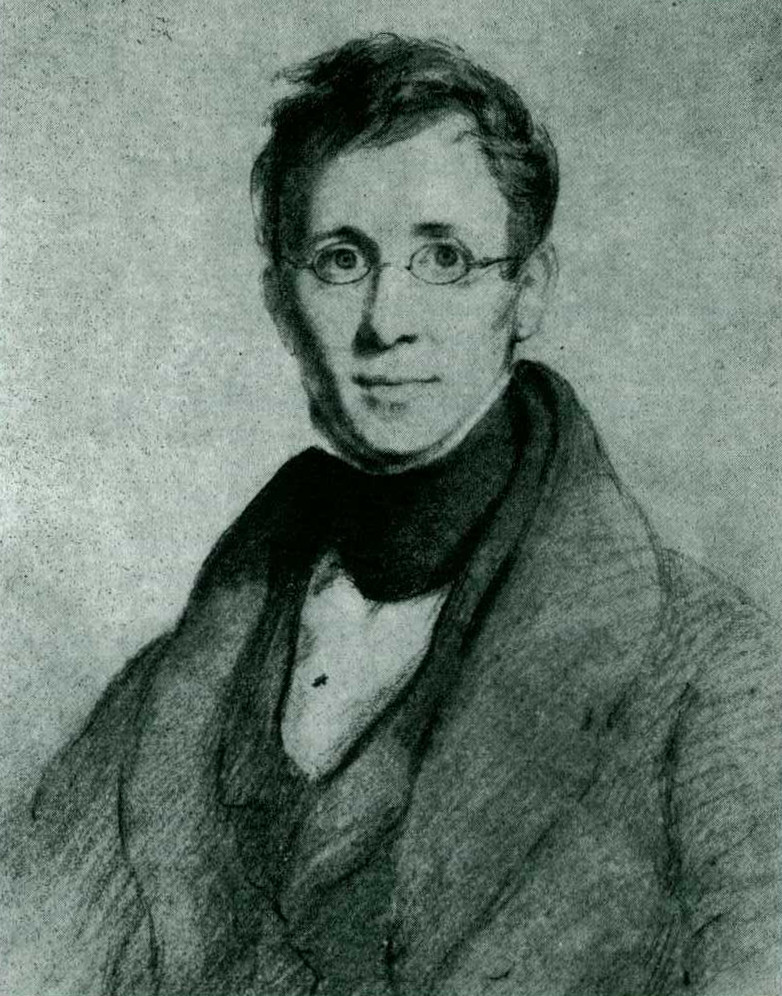
John Torrey as a young man

In 1817, he became one of the founders of the New York Lyceum of Natural History (now the New York Academy of Science), and one of his first contributions to this body was his Catalogue of Plants growing spontaneously within Thirty Miles of the City of New York (Albany, 1819). Its publication gained for him the recognition of foreign and native botanists. In 1824 he issued the only volume of his Flora of the Northern and Middle States. This used John Lindley's system of classifying flora, a way of classifying that was not commonly used in the United States.

He found the medical profession uncongenial, and on August 5, 1824, he entered the United States Army as an assistant surgeon and became acting professor of chemistry and geology at West Point military academy. Three years later, he became professor of chemistry and botany in the College of Physicians and Surgeons, New York (the medical school of Columbia University), where he stayed until 1855, when he was made professor emeritus. He was also professor of chemistry at Princeton 1830–1854, and of chemistry, mineralogy, and botany at the University of the City of New York 1832/3. He resigned from his Army position on August 31, 1828. In 1835, he was elected a member of the American Philosophical Society.

In 1836 he was appointed botanist to the state of New York and produced his Flora of that state in 1843; while from 1838 to 1843 he carried on the publication of the earlier portions of Flora of North America, with the assistance of his pupil, Asa Gray. From 1853 he was chief assayer to the United States assay office in New York City when that office was established, but he continued to take an interest in botanical teaching until his death. He was frequently consulted by the treasury department on matters pertaining to the coinage and currency, and was sent on special missions at various times to visit the different mints. He was elected an Associate Fellow of the American Academy of Arts and Sciences in 1856.

In 1856, Torrey was chosen a trustee of Columbia College, and in 1860, having presented the college with his herbarium, numbering about 50,000 specimens, he was made emeritus professor of chemistry and botany. On the consolidation of the College of Physicians and Surgeons with Columbia in 1860, he was chosen one of its trustees. His advice was frequently sought on scientific subjects by various corporations.

He was the first president of the Torrey Botanical Club in 1873. Besides being the last surviving charter member of the Lyceum of Natural History, he held its vice presidency for several years, and was president in 1824–26 and 1838, holding the same office in the American Association for the Advancement of Science in 1855, and he was one of the original members of the National Academy of Sciences of the United States, being named as such by act of the United States Congress in 1863. The degree of A.M. was conferred on him by Yale in 1823, and that of LL.D. by Amherst in 1845.

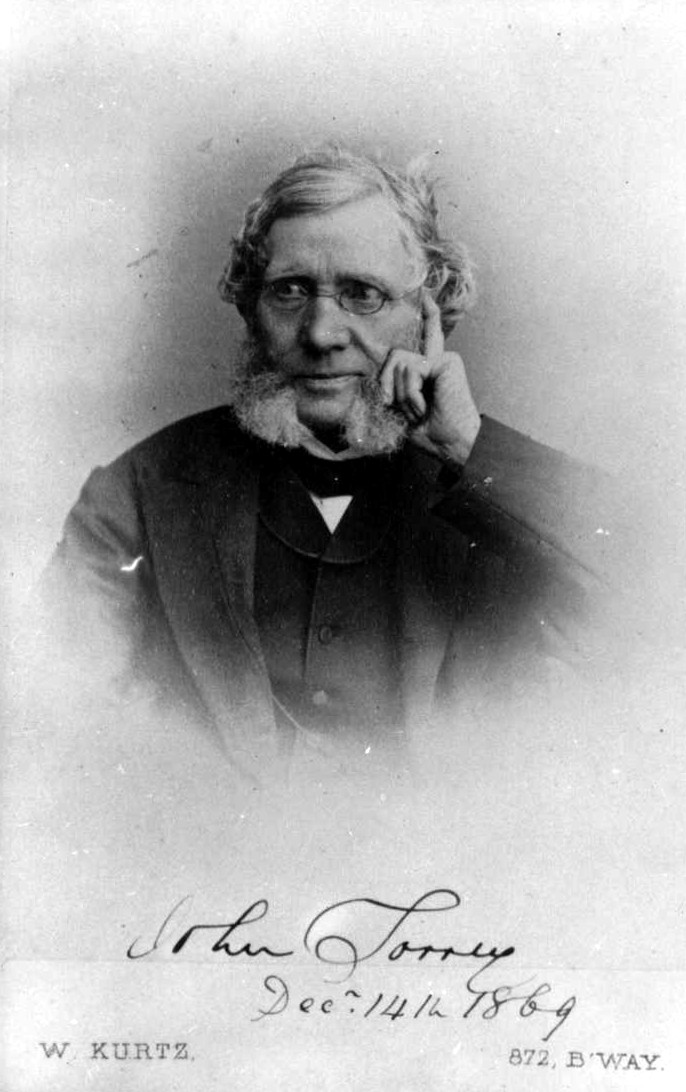
John Torrey in 1869

Torrey died at his home in New York City on March 10, 1873; he was buried in the family plot at Long Hill Cemetery, Stirling, New Jersey.

=== Private life ===
Torrey married Eliza Shaw on April 20, 1824; they had three daughters and a son, Herbert, who became United States Assayer.

== Publications ==
Torrey's earliest publications in the American Journal of Science are on mineralogy. In 1820, he undertook the examination of the plants that had been collected around the headwaters of the Mississippi by David B. Douglass. During the same year, he received the collections made by Edwin James while with the expedition that was sent out to the Rocky Mountains under Major Stephen H. Long. His report was the earliest treatise of its kind in the United States that was arranged on the natural system. Torrey, in the meantime, had planned A Flora of the Northern and Middle United States, or a Systematic Arrangement and Description of all the Plants heretofore discovered in the United States North of Virginia, and in 1824 began its publication in parts, but it was soon suspended owing to the general adoption of the natural system of Antoine Laurent de Jussieu in place of that of Carl Linnaeus. In 1836, on the organization of the geological survey of New York, he was appointed botanist, and required to prepare a flora of the state. His report, consisting of two quarto volumes, was issued in 1843, and was for a long time the most comprehensive for any state in the United States. In 1838, he began with Asa Gray The Flora of North America, which was issued in numbers irregularly until 1843, when they had completed the Compositae, but new botanical material accumulated at such a rapid rate that it was deemed best to discontinue it.

Subsequently, Torrey published reports on the plants that were collected by John C. Frémont in the expedition to the Rocky Mountains (1845), those gathered by Major William H. Emory on his reconnaissance from Fort Leavenworth, Kansas, to San Diego, California (1848), the specimens secured by Captain Howard Stansbury on his expedition to the Great Salt Lake of Utah (1852), the plants collected by John C. Frémont in California (1853), those brought back from the Red River of Louisiana by Captain Randolph B. Marcy (1853), and the botany of Captain Lorenzo Sitgreaves's expedition to the Zuni and Colorado Rivers (1854), also memoirs on the botany of the various expeditions for the purpose of determining the most practicable route for a Pacific Railroad (1855–1860).

He reported on the Botany of the Mexican Boundary Survey (1859), that of the expedition upon the Colorado River under Lieutenant Joseph C. Ives (1861), and, in association with Asa Gray, the botanical collections of the Wilkes exploring expedition. The last was in his hands at the time of his death, its publication having been delayed by the Civil War.

His bibliography is extensive, including contributions on botanical subjects to scientific periodicals and to the transactions of the societies of which he was a member.

== Legacy ==
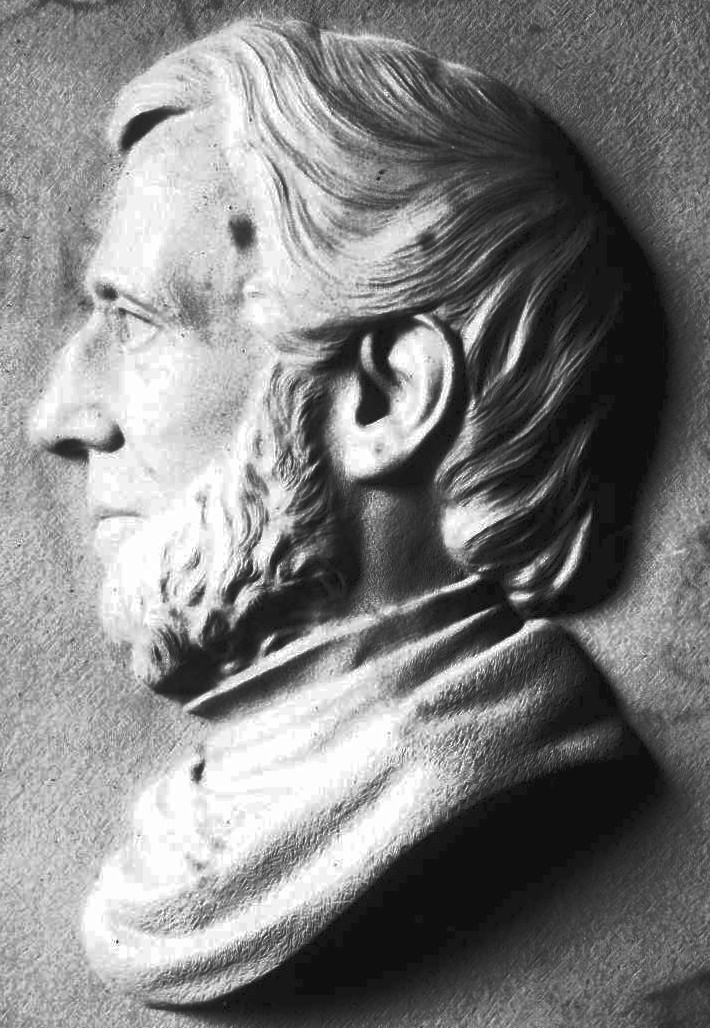
Bas relief portrait of John Torrey

Torrey's name is commemorated in the small coniferous genus Torreya, found in North America, China and Japan. Some species within this genus include:

- T. taxifolia, a native of Florida, is known as the Florida torreya or stinking-cedar.
- T. californica, also known as California nutmeg or California torreya (although not closely related to true nutmeg).
- T. nucifera, a coniferous tree native to southern Japan and to South Korea's Jeju Island
- T. grandis, a conifer endemic to eastern and south-eastern China.

P. torreyana an endangered species from southern California, is also named after the botanist. Torrey first described the carnivorous plant Darlingtonia californica, which he named after his friend Dr. William Darlington. Torrey Canyon in Ventura County, California, was named for him, as was Torreys Peak in Colorado, near Grays Peak, named after his pupil and friend Asa Gray.

A bronze bas-relief portrait of Torrey is mounted in the main building of the Lamont–Doherty Earth Observatory of Columbia University, a former site of Dr. Torrey's summer home. A similar portrait is owned by the Brooklyn Botanic Garden. In 2017, the Torrey Botanical Society, started by colleagues of John Torrey, celebrated its 150th birthday. It is the oldest botanical society in the Americas.

Torreys Peak, a fourteen thousand foot mountain in Colorado, was named for Torrey.

== Additional publications online ==
- Botanic contributions relating to the flora of western North America [by] Gray, Engelmann, Torrey [and] Frémont (1843–53)
- A compendium of the flora of the northern and middle states, containing generic and specific descriptions of all the plants, exclusive of the cryptogamia, hitherto found in the United States, north of the Potomac (1826)
- A flora of North America :containing abridged descriptions of all the known indigenous and naturalized plants growing north of Mexico, arranged according to the natural system by John Torrey and Asa Gray (1838–1843) Two volumes.
- An introduction to the natural system of botany (1831) With John Lindley.
- On the Darlingtonia californica, a new pitcher-plant from northern California by John Torrey (1853)
- Report on the United States and Mexican boundary survey: made under the direction of the secretary of the Interior by William H. Emory, major First Cavalry, and United States commissioner (1857–1859) Part 1 / Part 2 Torrey et al.
