= Mount Edwards (Colorado) =

Mountain in the state of Colorado

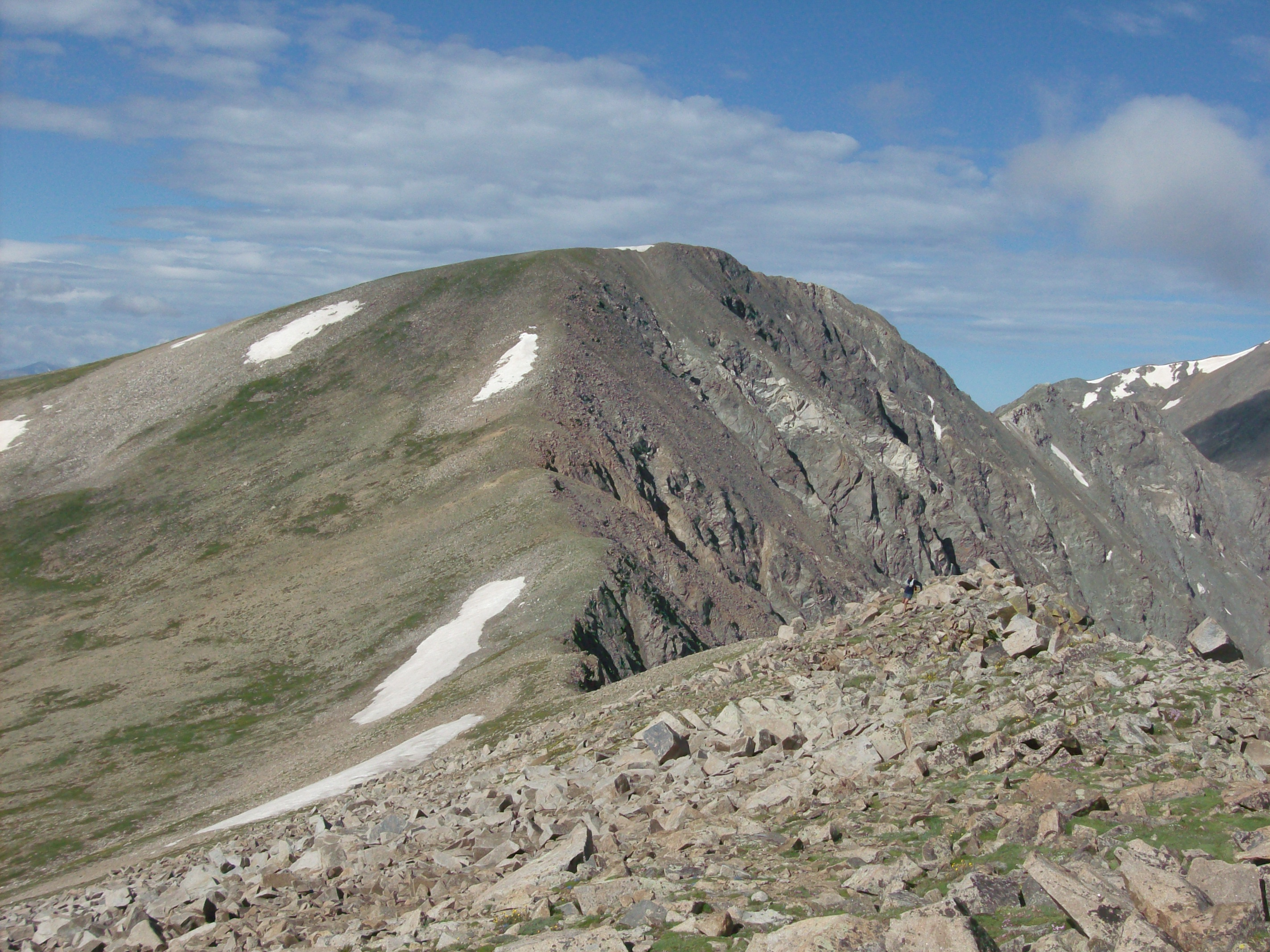
- Mount Edwards viewed near McClellan Mountain's summit

Highest point
- Elevation: 13,856 ft (4,223 m)
- Prominence: 470 ft (140 m)
- Parent peak: Grays Peak
- Isolation: 1.29 mi (2.08 km)
- Coordinates: 39°38′11″N 105°47′38″W

Geography
- Location within Colorado
- Location: Continental Divide between Clear Creek and Summit counties, Colorado, United States
- Parent range: Front Range
- Topo map(s): USGS 7.5' topographic map Grays Peak, Colorado

Mount Edwards is a high mountain summit in the Rocky Mountains' Front Range of North America. The 13,856-foot (4,223 m) thirteener is located in Arapaho National Forest, 7.6 miles (12.3 km) southwest (bearing 223°) of the Town of Georgetown, Colorado, United States, on the Continental Divide between Clear Creek and Summit counties.

== See also ==
- List of Colorado mountain ranges
- List of Colorado mountain summits
  - List of Colorado fourteeners
  - List of Colorado 4000 meter prominent summits
  - List of the most prominent summits of Colorado
- List of Colorado county high points
