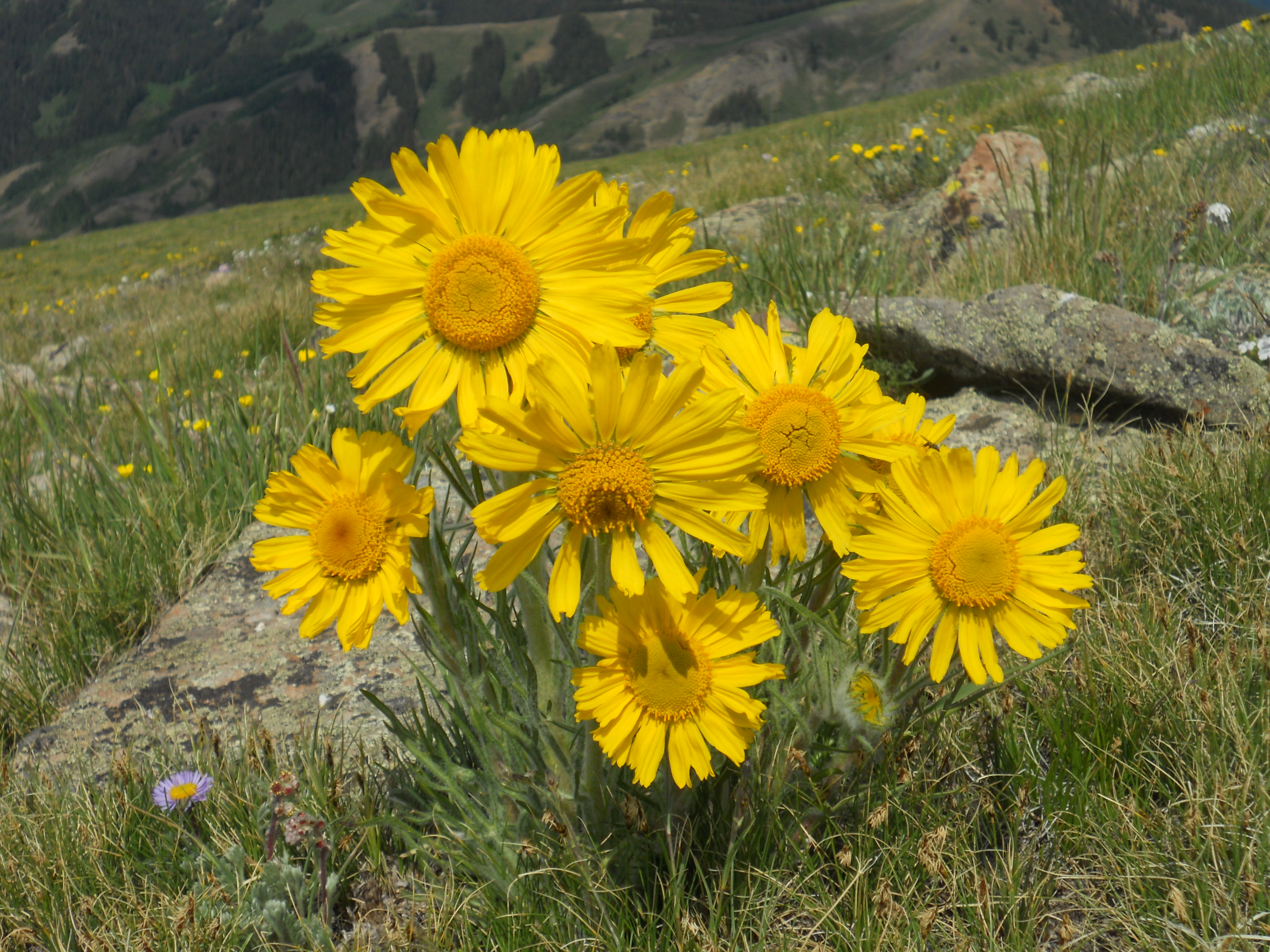

Conservation status
- Apparently Secure (NatureServe)

Scientific classification
- Kingdom: Plantae
- Clade: Tracheophytes
- Clade: Angiosperms
- Clade: Eudicots
- Clade: Asterids
- Order: Asterales
- Family: Asteraceae
- Genus: Hymenoxys
- Species: H. grandiflora

Binomial name
- Hymenoxys grandiflora (Torr. ex A.Gray) K.F.Parker 1950

Synonyms
- Synonymy: Actinea grandiflora (Torr. & A.Gray ex Torr. & A.Gray) Kuntze; Actinella grandiflora Torr. & A.Gray 1845; Cephalophora grandiflora (Torr. & A.Gray) Walp.; Ptilepida grandiflora (Torr. & A.Gray) Rose; Rydbergia grandiflora (Torr. & A.Gray ex Torr. & A.Gray) Greene; Tetraneuris grandiflora (Torr. & A.Gray ex Torr. & A.Gray) K.F.Parker

= Hymenoxys grandiflora =

Species of flowering plant

Hymenoxys grandiflora is a North American species of flowering plant in the daisy family known by the common names graylocks four-nerve daisy, graylocks rubberweed, or old man of the mountain. It is native to high elevations in the Rocky Mountains of the western United States.

== Description ==
H. grandiflora is a perennial herb up to 30 centimeters (1 foot) tall. The leaves are 7.5–10 cm (3–4 in) long. The plant generally produces one flower head per stem, up to 10 per plant, present between June and August. Each head has 15–44 ray flowers and 150–400 disc flowers. The seeds are five-sided with narrow scales at the tip.

The species has the largest flowers of any in its genus, hence the specific epithet grandiflora (large-flowered).

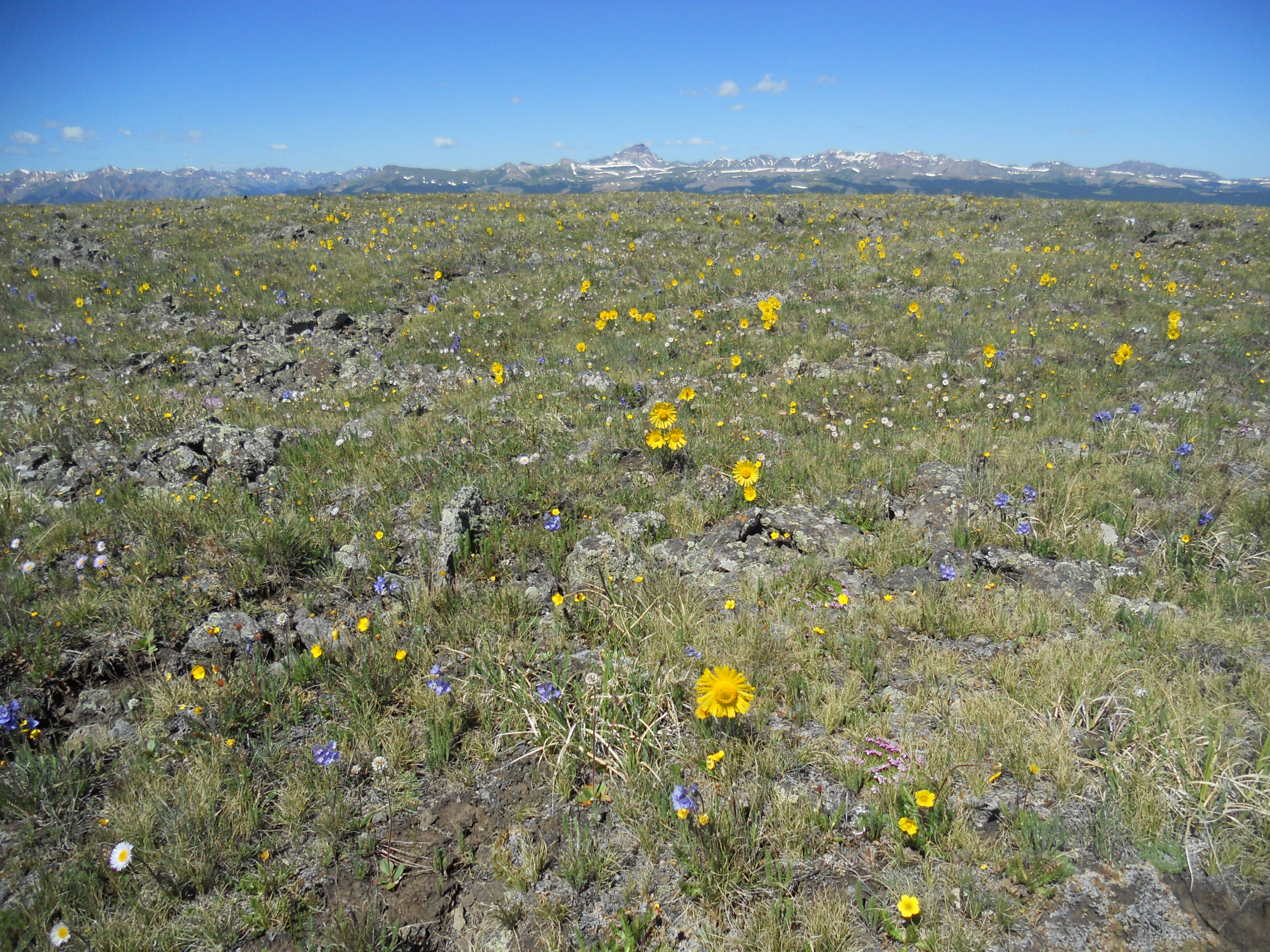
Cannibal Plateau, Powderhorn Wilderness, Hinsdale County, Colorado

== Distribution and habitat ==
The plant is native to high elevations in the Rocky Mountains of the western United States, in the states of Montana, Idaho, Wyoming, Utah, Colorado, and New Mexico. It can be found on rocky slopes, meadows, and tundra environments.
