= Grays Peak =

Mountain in the state of Colorado, United States

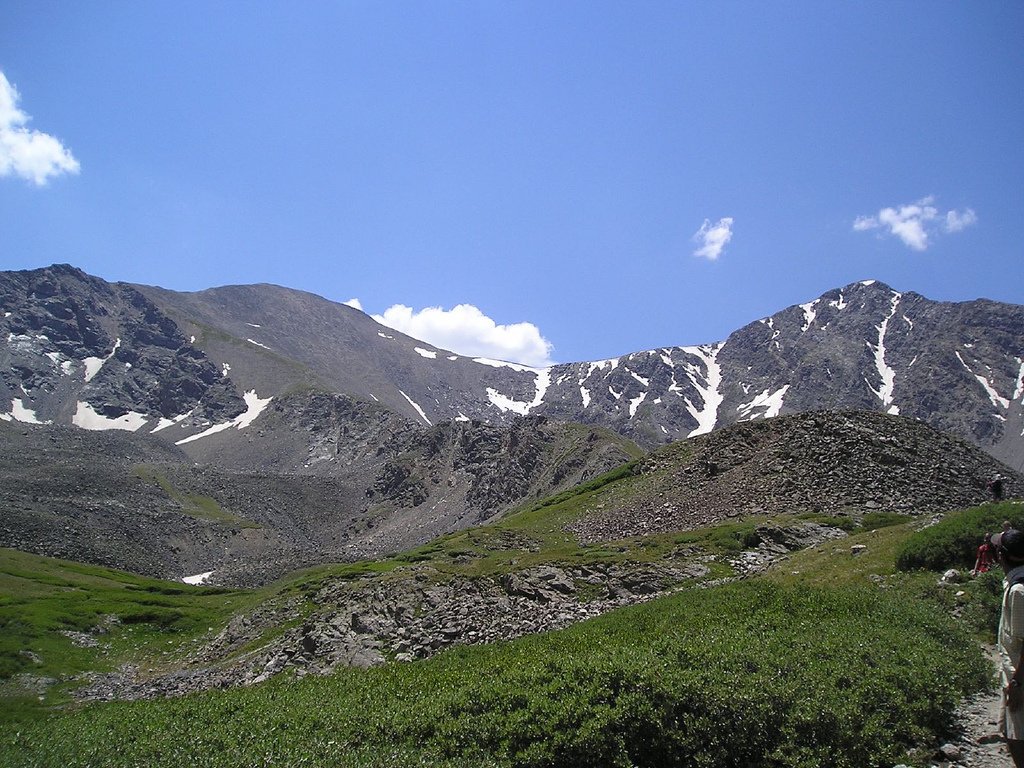
- Grays Peak on left, Torreys Peak on right

Highest point
- Elevation: 14,275.5 ft (4,351.2 m); NAPGD2022
- Prominence: 2770 ft (844 m)
- Isolation: 25.0 mi (40.2 km)
- Listing: North America highest peaks 39th; US highest major peaks 25th; Colorado highest major peaks 10th; Colorado fourteeners 10th; Colorado county high points 11th
- Coordinates: 39°38′02″N 105°49′03″W

Naming
- Etymology: Asa Gray

Geography
- Location within Colorado
- Location: High point of the Continental Divide in North America and the high point of both Clear Creek and Summit counties, Colorado, U.S.
- Parent range: Highest summit of the Front Range
- Topo map(s): USGS 7.5' topographic map Grays Peak, Colorado

Climbing
- First ascent: 1861 by Charles C. Parry
- Easiest route: 3.5 mile (5.6 km) hike on Grays Peak Trail

Grays Peak is the tenth-highest summit of the Rocky Mountains of North America and the U.S. state of Colorado. The prominent 14,276-foot (4351.18 m) fourteener is the highest summit of the Front Range and the highest point on the Continental Divide and the Continental Divide Trail in North America. (There are higher summits, such as Mount Elbert, which are near, but not on, the Divide.) Grays Peak is located in Arapahoe National Forest, 3.9 miles (6.2 km) southeast by east (bearing 122°) of Loveland Pass on the Continental Divide between Clear Creek and Summit counties. The peak is the highest point in both counties. (Note: The elevation of Grays Peak includes an adjustment of +1.881 m (+6.17 ft) from NGVD 29 to NAVD 88.)

Grays Peak is one of 53 fourteeners (mountains of over 14,000 feet (4,300 m) in elevation) in Colorado. Botanist Charles C. Parry made the first recorded ascent of the summit in 1861 and named the peak in honor of his botanist colleague Asa Gray. Gray did not see (and climb) the peak until 1872, eleven years later. Grays Peak is commonly mentioned in conjunction with adjacent Torreys Peak. In the Arapaho language Gray's Peak and the adjacent Torrey's Peak are named, Heeniiyoowuu or "Ant Hills".

== Climbing ==
Like the other fourteeners nearby, Grays Peak is considered to be an easy hike by fourteener standards, and is very popular among weekend climbers. Often a climb to the summit of Grays Peak is accompanied by continuing on to Torreys Peak, less than a mile away. The main trail, Grays Peak Trail, departs from Stevens Gulch. With cuts in the road over two feet deep and large stones in the path, travel to the trailhead is only feasible for high-clearance four-wheel-drive vehicles, motorcycles or all-terrain vehicles.

From the trailhead, it is a hike of about 3.5 miles (5.6 km) and a climb of 3,040 feet (930 m). The trail, well-marked and well-trodden, begins by following the gulch for a slow rise in elevation, before hitting the steeper slopes. The summit includes a very small U-shaped rock shelter where a log book is maintained. Extensive views stretch south to Pike's Peak and the San Luis Valley, east to the Great Plains, West to Silverthorne, and north to Longs Peak and Rocky Mountain National Park. At the climber's option, the trail continues from the summit north to Torreys Peak. The trail descends the saddle down to 13,707 ft (4,178 m) before climbing back to the summit of Torreys Peak at 14,274 ft (4,351 m).

== Climate ==
Climate data for Grays Peak 39.6352 N, 105.8176 W, Elevation: 13,796 ft (4,205 m) (1991–2020 normals)
Month	Jan	Feb	Mar	Apr	May	Jun	Jul	Aug	Sep	Oct	Nov	Dec	Year
Mean daily maximum °F (°C)	19.4 (−7.0)	18.4 (−7.6)	24.2 (−4.3)	30.9 (−0.6)	39.5 (4.2)	50.2 (10.1)	56.2 (13.4)	53.8 (12.1)	47.8 (8.8)	36.9 (2.7)	26.0 (−3.3)	19.7 (−6.8)	35.3 (1.8)
Daily mean °F (°C)	8.4 (−13.1)	7.4 (−13.7)	12.6 (−10.8)	18.3 (−7.6)	27.1 (−2.7)	37.2 (2.9)	43.4 (6.3)	41.7 (5.4)	35.5 (1.9)	25.2 (−3.8)	15.5 (−9.2)	9.0 (−12.8)	23.4 (−4.8)
Mean daily minimum °F (°C)	−2.6 (−19.2)	−3.7 (−19.8)	0.9 (−17.3)	5.6 (−14.7)	14.8 (−9.6)	24.3 (−4.3)	30.7 (−0.7)	29.6 (−1.3)	23.2 (−4.9)	13.5 (−10.3)	5.0 (−15.0)	−1.7 (−18.7)	11.6 (−11.3)
Average precipitation inches (mm)	4.37 (111)	4.36 (111)	4.15 (105)	4.97 (126)	3.76 (96)	1.79 (45)	3.13 (80)	3.04 (77)	2.21 (56)	2.72 (69)	3.59 (91)	3.96 (101)	42.05 (1,068)
Source: PRISM Climate Group

== Wildlife ==
Wildlife in the area includes, mountain goat, pika, cougar or mountain lion, mule deer, elk, marmot, coyote, ptarmigan, American red squirrel, and Canada jay. Wildflowers that bloom in the tundra area on the Continental Divide of the Americas include moss campion (Silene acaulis), alpine forget-me-not (Myosotis alpestris), sky pilot (Polemonium viscosum), sea pink, old-man-of-the-mountain (Rydbergia grandiflora), and mountain gentian (Gentiana). Below the tree-line, the blooms of monkshood or wolfsbane, blue columbine, fireweed, and paintbrush (Castilleja) can be found.

== Gallery ==
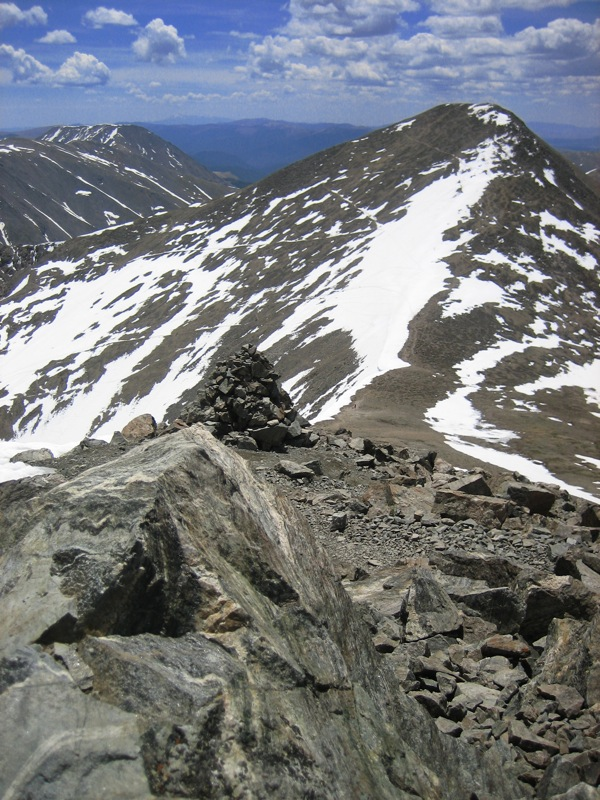
Grays Peak as seen from nearby Torreys Peak

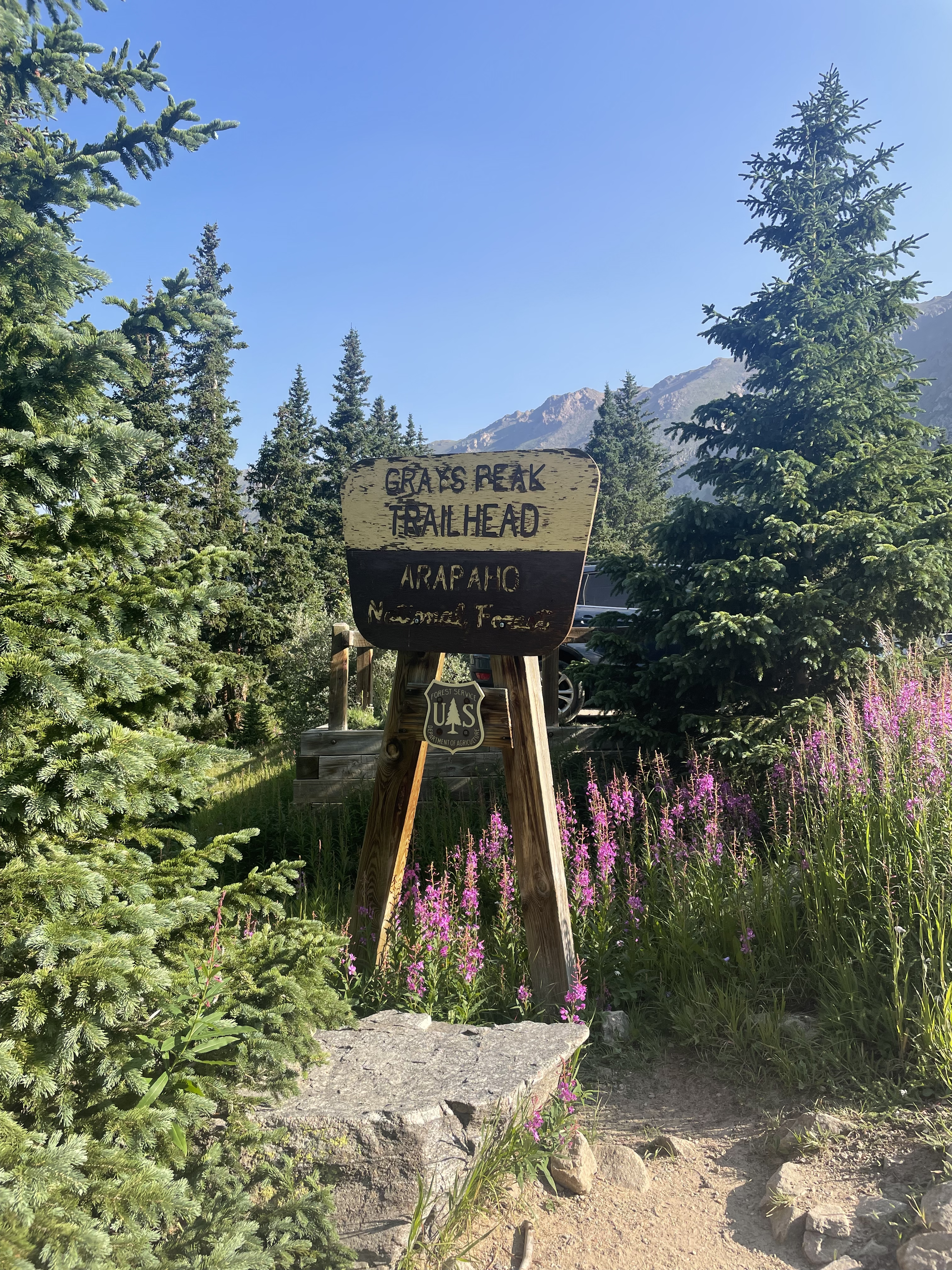
Grays Peak trailhead

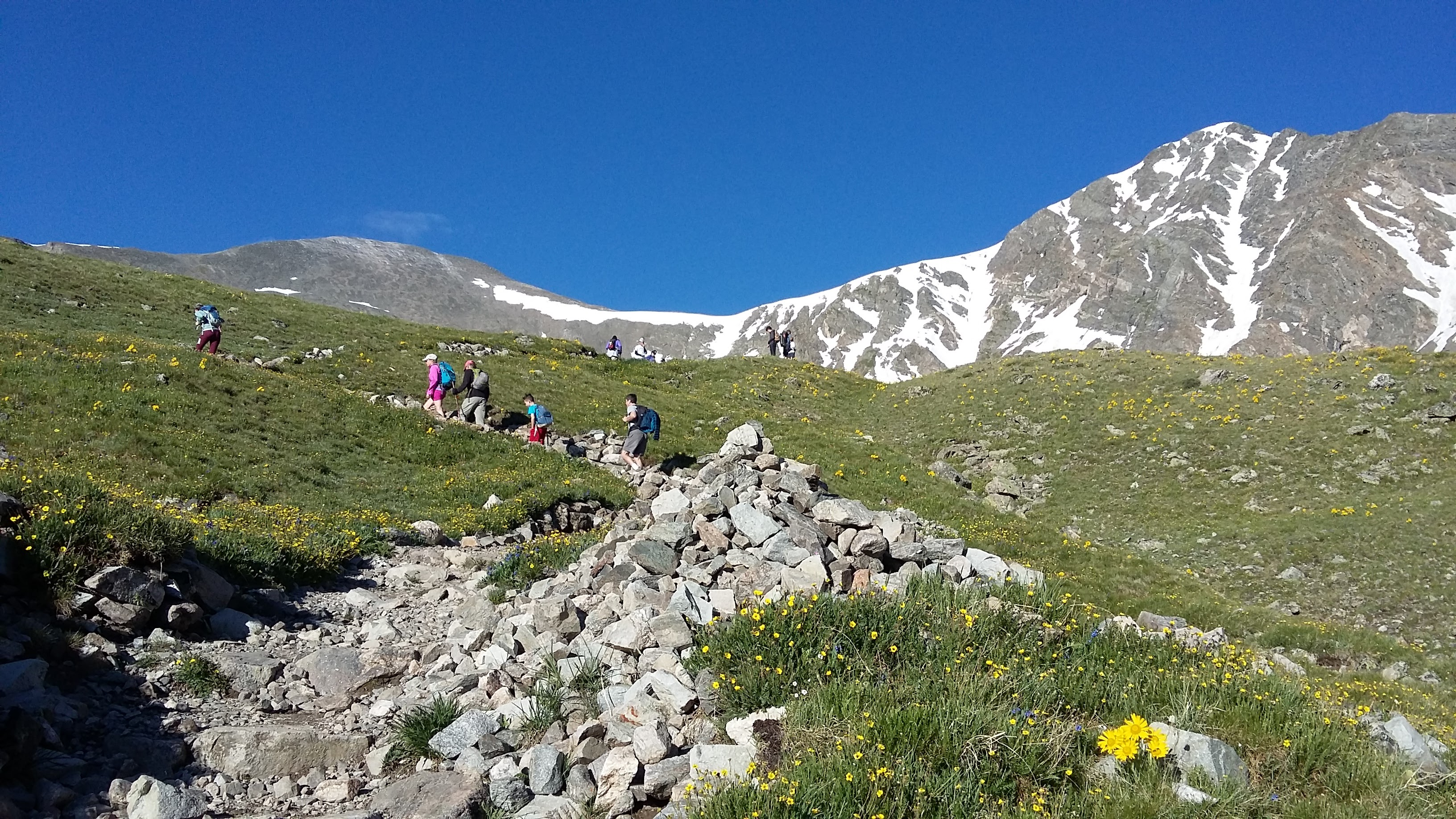
Cairn along trail

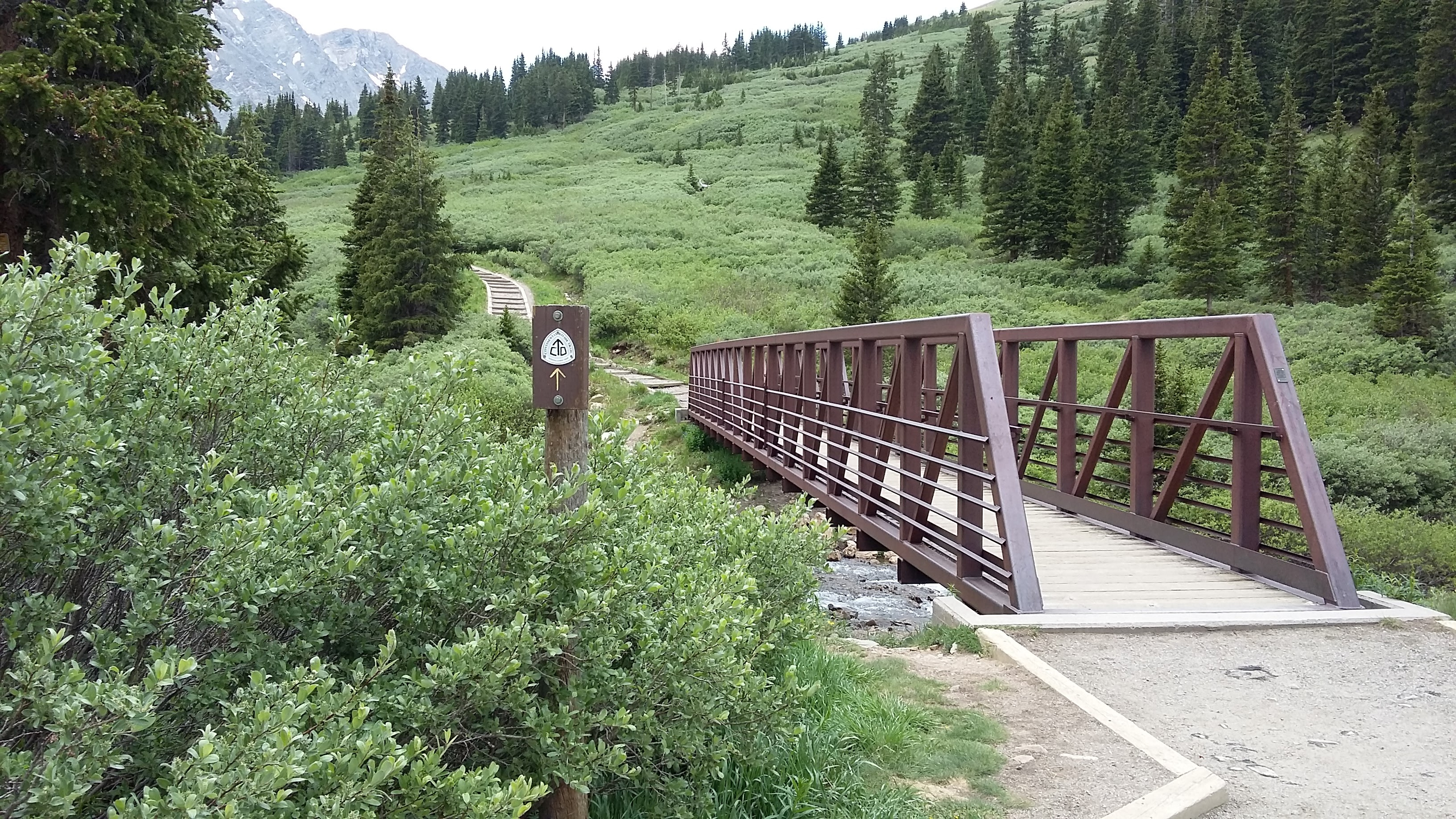
Footbridge at the beginning of the trail

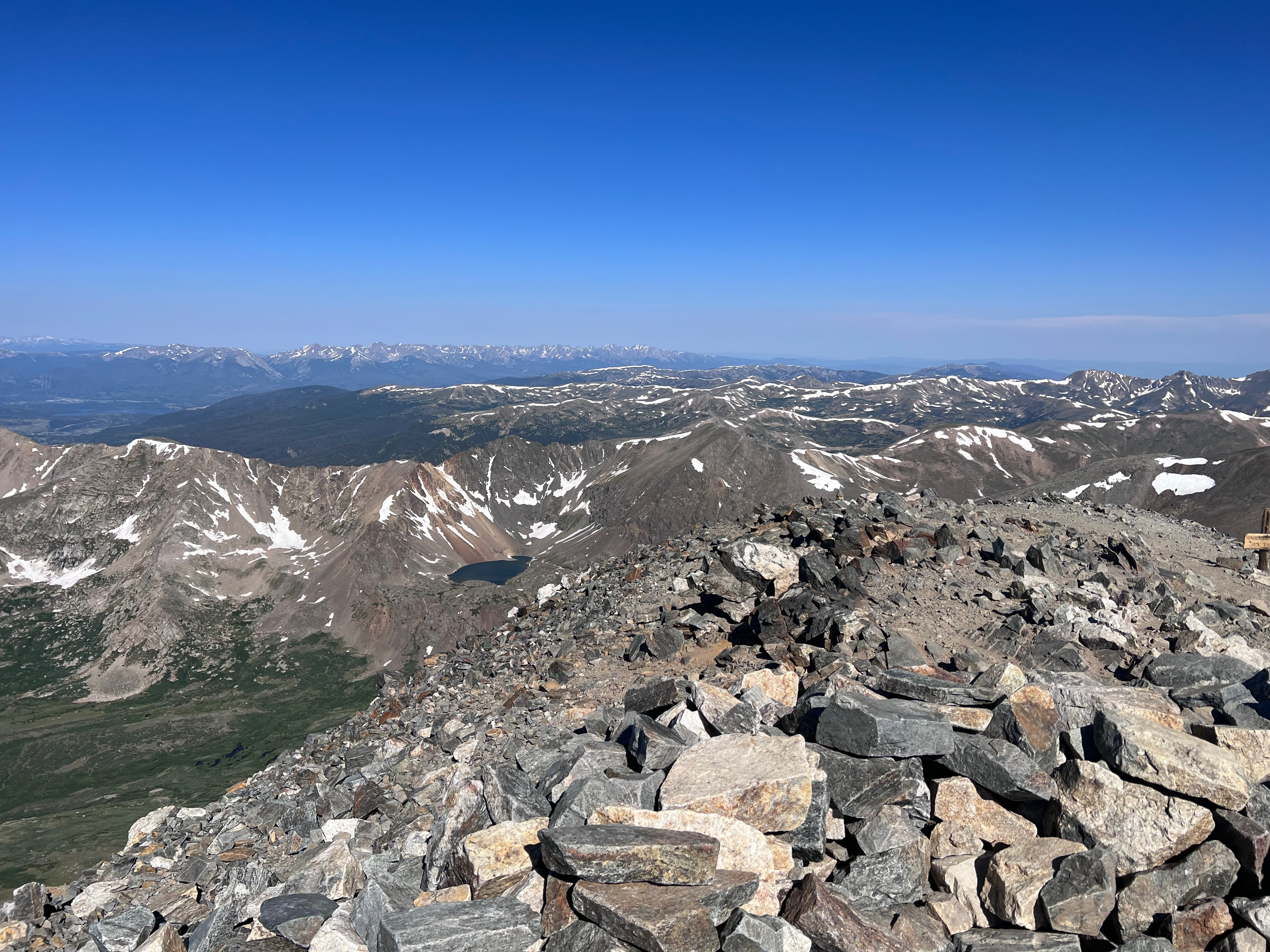
From Grays Peak summit looking west

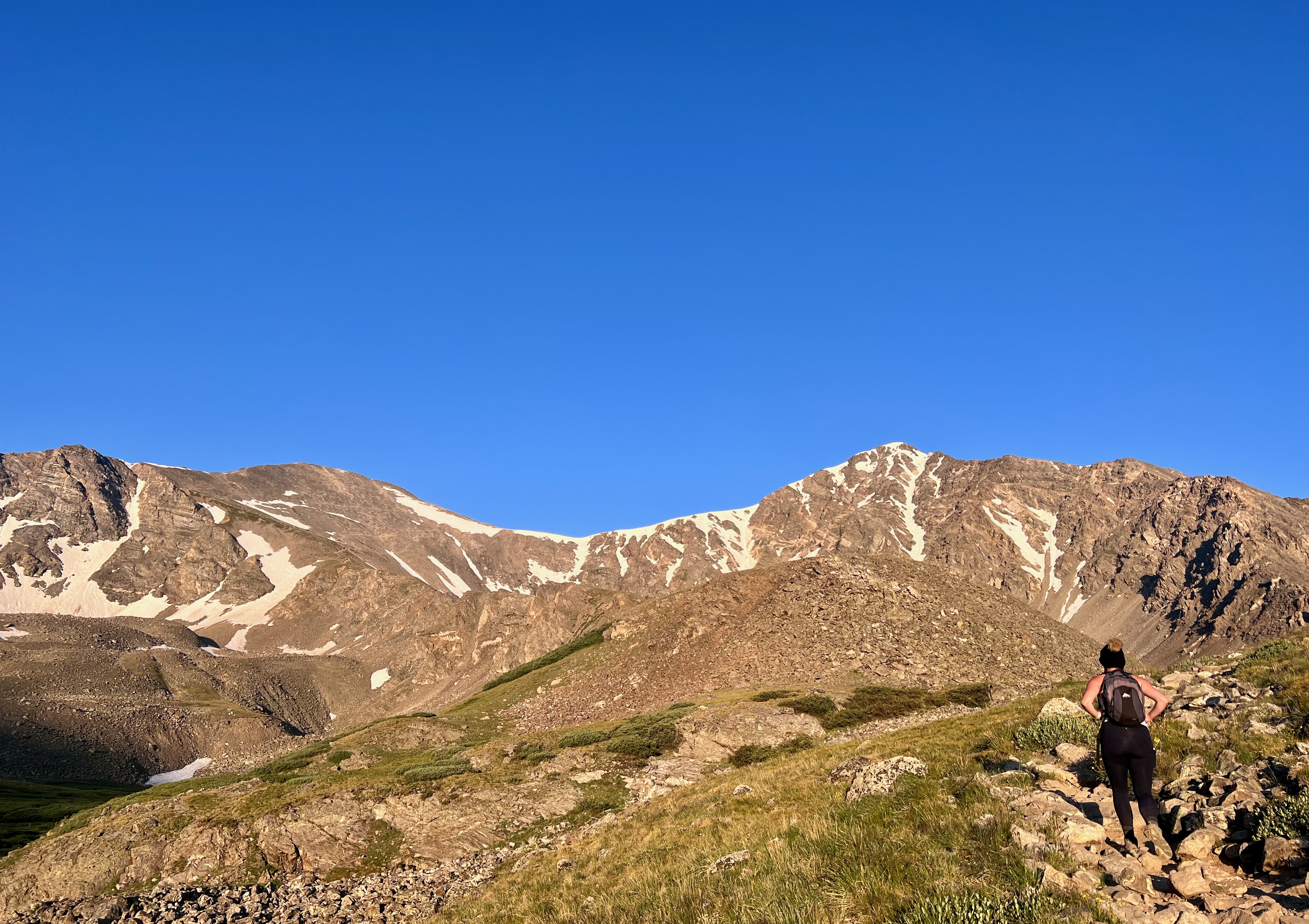
Morning on the Grays Peak trail - Grays Peak on the left, Torreys Peak on the right

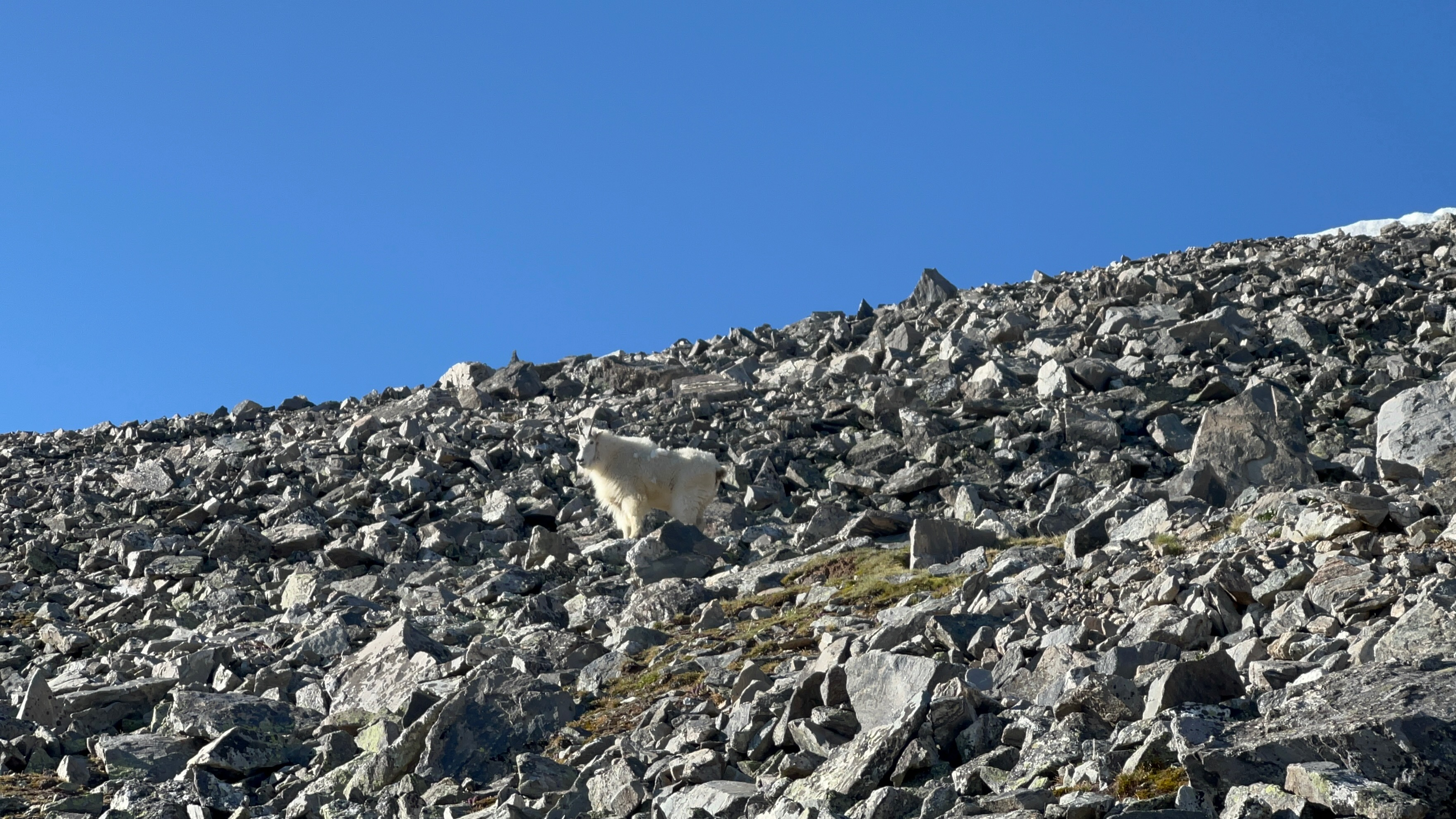
Mountain Goat from Grays Peak trail

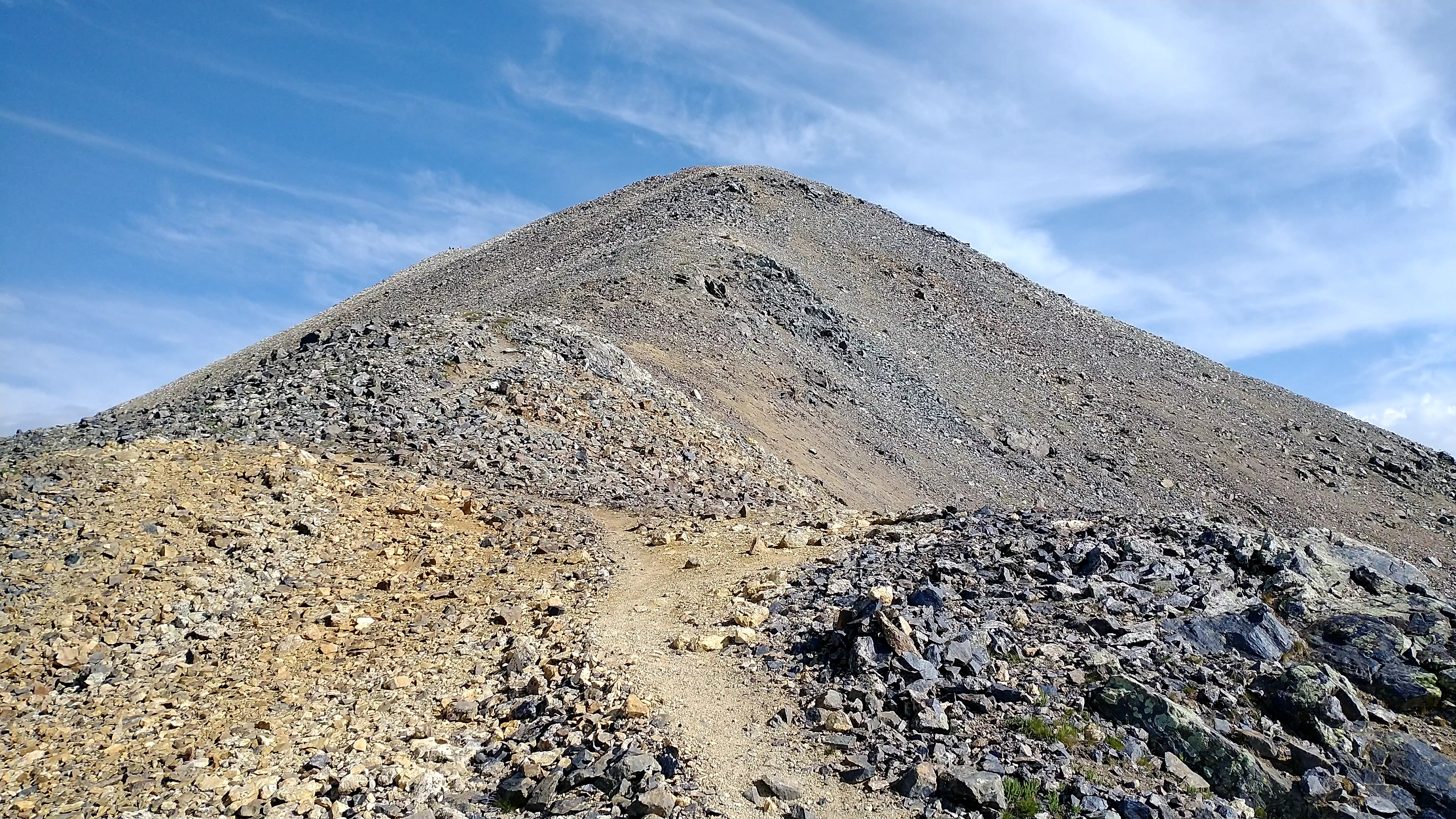
The South Ridge of Grays Peak

== See also ==
- List of mountain peaks of North America
  - List of mountain peaks of the United States
    - List of mountain peaks of Colorado
      - List of Colorado county high points
      - List of Colorado fourteeners
- Continental Divide of the Americas
