= Sea pink =

Sea pink is a common name for several plants and may refer to:

- Armeria spp.
- Sabatia stellaris
