= National Register of Historic Places listings in Eagle County, Colorado =

Location of Eagle County in Colorado

This is a list of the National Register of Historic Places listings in Eagle County, Colorado.

This is intended to be a complete list of the properties and districts on the National Register of Historic Places in Eagle County, Colorado, United States. The locations of National Register properties and districts for which the latitude and longitude coordinates are included below, may be seen in a map.

There are 12 properties and districts listed on the National Register in the county. Another 4 properties were once listed but have been removed.

This National Park Service list is complete through NPS recent listings posted August 28, 2026.

== Current listings ==
	Name on the Register	Image	Date listed	Location	City or town	Description
1	Archeological Site 5EA484		May 10, 1982 (#82002299)	Address Restricted	Basalt	
2	Camp Hale Site	Camp Hale Site	April 10, 1992 (#78003522)	Between Leadville and Red Cliff; 39°26′38″N 106°19′34″W	Leadville	Former Army base
3	First Evangelical Lutheran Church	First Evangelical Lutheran Church	June 24, 1993 (#93000576)	400 2nd St. 39°38′44″N 106°57′08″W	Gypsum	
4	Glassier Farmstead		August 16, 2023 (#100009260)	0543 Hooks Spur Ln. 39°22′46″N 107°05′31″W	Basalt vicinity	
5	Notch Mountain Shelter		March 10, 2015 (#15000059)	Notch Mtn. Summit, White River NF; 39°28′41″N 106°27′35″W	Minturn vicinity	
6	Red Cliff Bridge	Red Cliff Bridge	February 4, 1985 (#85000204)	U.S. Highway 24; 39°30′29″N 106°22′34″W	Red Cliff	
7	State Bridge	State Bridge	June 24, 1985 (#85001401)	Off State Highway 131; 39°51′29″N 106°38′54″W	State Bridge	
8	Tigiwon Community House	Tigiwon Community House	March 10, 2015 (#15000060)	FSR 707, Holy Cross Dist., White River NF; 39°31′24″N 106°25′14″W	Minturn vicinity	
9	Upper Brush Creek School	Upper Brush Creek School	April 6, 2015 (#15000126)	Between Coulter Meadow & W. Brush Cr. Rds. 39°32′09″N 106°45′10″W	Eagle vicinity	In/near Sylvan Lake State Park
10	Waterwheel	Waterwheel	April 11, 1977 (#77000372)	Southeast of McCoy at the Colorado River; 39°54′10″N 106°43′02″W	McCoy	Water wheel set into Colorado River which lifted water 32 feet (9.8 m) for use in irrigation.
11	Woods Lake Resort		August 11, 1988 (#88001226)	11 miles (18 km) north of Thomasville at Woods Lake; 39°25′32″N 106°37′35″W	Thomasville	
12	Yarmony Archeological Site		May 28, 1991 (#91000615)	Address Restricted	Radium	

== Former listings ==
	Name on the Register	Image	Date listed	Date removed	Location	City or town	Description
1	Dotsero Bridge	Dotsero Bridge	October 15, 2002 (#02001155)	November 9, 2017	Interstate 70 service road at milepost 133.51; 39°38′57″N 107°03′47″W	Dotsero	Demolished
2	Eagle River Bridge	Eagle River Bridge	October 15, 2002 (#02001156)	November 9, 2017	U.S. Highway 6 at milepost 150.24; 39°39′36″N 106°48′55″W	Eagle	
3	Wolcott Bridge		October 15, 2002 (#02001157)	March 20, 2011	State Highway 131 at milepost 0.07; 39°42′06″N 106°40′39″W	Wolcott	Part of the Highway Bridges in Colorado Multiple Property Submission
4	Wolcott Stage Station	Wolcott Stage Station	August 22, 1975 (#75000518)	May 31, 1989	N bank of Eagle River off SH 131	Wolcott	Also known as the Bocco House

== See also ==
- List of National Historic Landmarks in Colorado
- List of National Register of Historic Places in Colorado
- Bibliography of Colorado
- Geography of Colorado
- History of Colorado
- Index of Colorado-related articles
- List of Colorado-related lists
- Outline of Colorado
