= Holy Cross Wilderness =

National forest wilderness area in Colorado, United States

- IUCN category Ib (wilderness area)
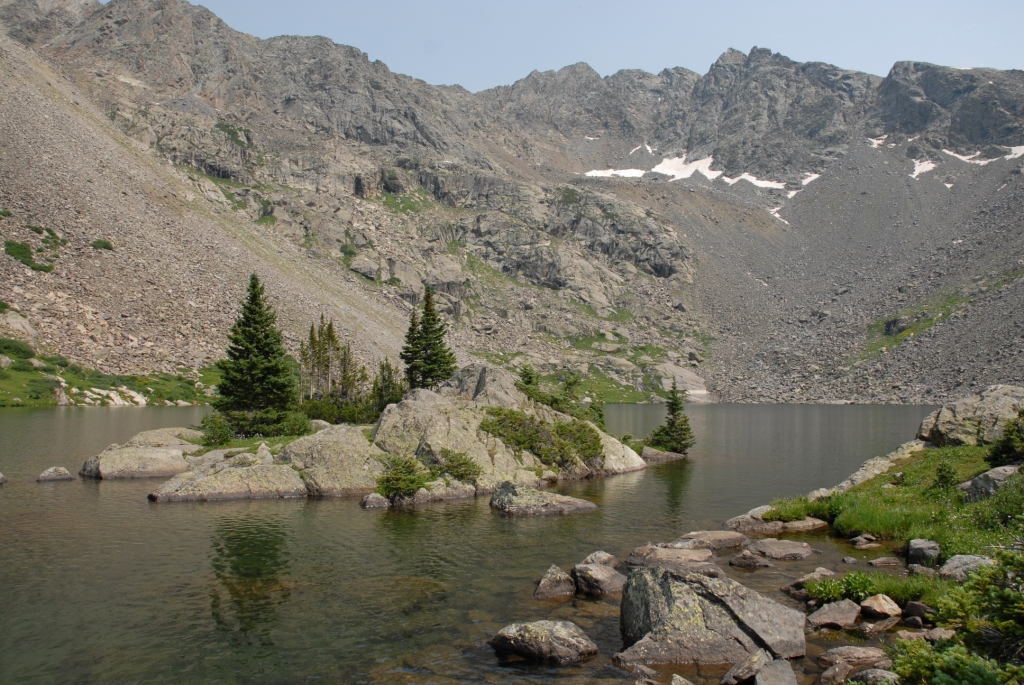
- Mystic Island Lake in the Holy Cross Wilderness

- Location within the United States
- Location: Eagle / Lake / Pitkin counties, Colorado, United States
- Nearest city: Vail, CO
- Coordinates: 39°28′01″N 106°28′54″W
- Area: 122,797 acres (496.94 km^{2})
- Established: 1980
- Governing body: U.S. Forest Service

The Holy Cross Wilderness is a U.S. Wilderness Area located in San Isabel and White River national forests near Leadville, Minturn, Avon, Edwards, Eagle, and Vail. The 122,797-acre (496.94 km^{2}) wilderness with 164 miles (264 km) of trails was established in 1980. The wilderness was named after its highest peak, 14,005-foot (4,269 m) Mount of the Holy Cross.

Holy Cross Wilderness is an area with many routes. Its neighbor Notch Mountain grants the backpacker or day tripper with a clear view of the "Cross" formed from the Mount of The Holy Cross, that has drawn many a visitor to the site.

The Holy Cross Wilderness has a history of many hikers, often those who are unprepared, becoming endangered. Primarily, the hikers who require rescue are unfamiliar with the risks of entering wilderness areas and do not bring adequate equipment and supplies to respond to emergency conditions. Thorough research and reasonable planning should prevent most tragedies as most occur due to a lack of risk management and preparation.

Holy Cross Wilderness hiking trails include Nolan Lake Trail, Lake Charles Trail to Lake Charles and Mystic Island Lake, New York Mountain Trail, Dead Dog Trail, Middle Lake Trail, Beaver Lake Trail to Beaver Lake and Turquoise Lake, Fancy Lake Trailhead (or Fancy Creek Trailhead on some maps) Grouse Lake Trail, West Grouse Creek Trail, Martin Creek Trail, Notch Mountain Trail, Half Moon Pass Trail to Mount of the Holy Cross, Tuhare Lakes Trail, and Cross Creek Trail to Treasure Vault Lake and Blodgett Lake.
