= 2021 Colorado wildfires =

Wildfires in the US

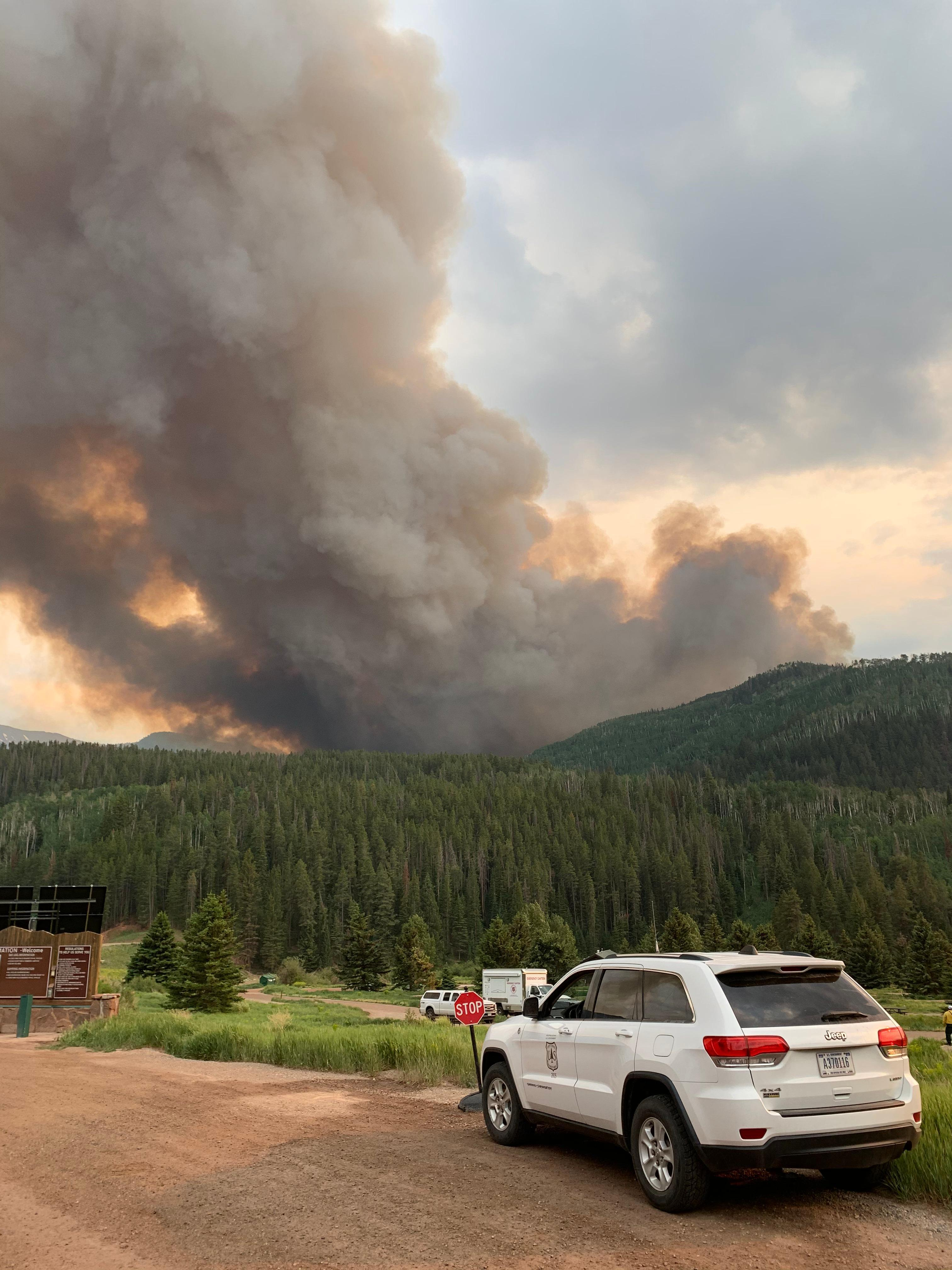

Statistics
- Total fires: 337
- Total area: 42,202 acres (17,079 ha)

Impacts
- Deaths: 4
- Injuries: 6
- Structures destroyed: 1,102
- Cost: >$513 million (2021 USD)

The 2021 Colorado wildfire season was a series of wildfires that burned throughout the U.S. state of Colorado. According to the National Interagency Fire Center, as of July 1, 2021, at least 32,860 acres (13,300 ha) of land had burned in at least 337 wildland fires across the state. Hundreds of homes were burned, and the cities of Louisville and Superior were evacuated, during the Boulder County fires in late December.

== Background ==
While "fire season" varies every year based on different weather conditions, most wildfires occur between May and September with a fire risk year-round with an increasing danger during winter. Drought and decreasing snowpack levels and lowering snowmelt and runoff increase fire risk. These conditions, along with increased temperatures and decreased humidity, are becoming more common from climate change. Vegetation growth provides an ample fuel for fires. From 2011 to 2020, Colorado experiences an average of 5,618 wildfires each year that collectively burn about 237,500 acres (96,100 ha).

== List of wildfires ==
The following is a list of fires that burned more than 1,000 acres (400 ha) or produced significant structural damage or casualties.

| Name | County | Acres | Start date | Containment date (Note: Containment means that fire crews have established and secured control lines around the fire's perimeter. These lines are artificial barriers, like trenches or cleared vegetation, designed to stop the fire's spread, or natural barriers like rivers. Containment reflects progress in managing the fire but does not necessarily mean the fire is starved of fuel, under control, or put out.) | Notes | Ref |
|---|---|---|---|---|---|---|
| Fort Lyon | Bent | 1,433 | January 15 | January 16 | | |
| Oil Springs | Rio Blanco | 12,613 | June 18 | July 10 | Lightning-caused | |
| West | Moffat, Sweetwater (WY) | 3,429 | June 20 | July 1 | Lightning-caused | |
| Muddy Slide | Routt | 4,093 | June 20 | September 14 | Lightning-caused; 18 structures destroyed | |
| Sylvan | Eagle | 3,792 | June 20 | October 14 | Lightning-caused | |
| Morgan Creek | Routt | 7,586 | July 10 | October 14 | Lightning-caused | |
| Bijou | Morgan | 3,083 | August 27 | August 28 | Lightning-caused | |
| Kruger Rock | Larimer | 147 | November 16 | November 20 | Sparked by winds blowing a tree onto a nearby powerline; 1 firefighter fatality | |
| Marshall Fire | Boulder | 6,026 | December 30 | January 1, 2022 | Unknown cause; 1,084 structures destroyed; 149 structures damaged; 1 fatality; 6 injuries | |

== See also ==
- Colorado State Forest Service
- List of Colorado wildfires
