= Notch Mountain =

Mountain in Colorado, United States

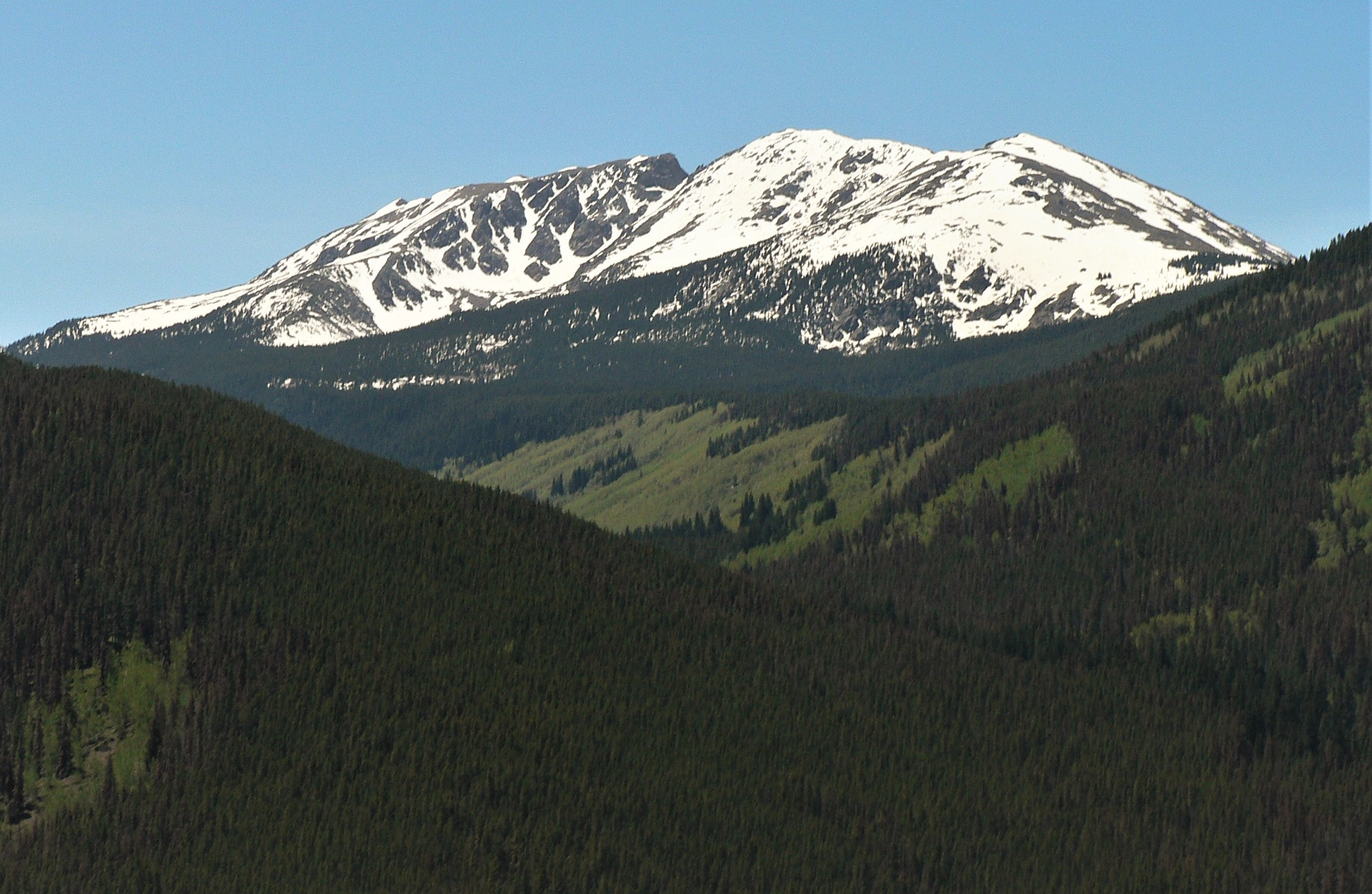
- Northeast aspect

Highest point
- Elevation: 13,243 ft (4,036 m)
- Prominence: 198 ft (60 m)
- Isolation: 0.91 mi (1.46 km)
- Coordinates: 39°28′39″N 106°27′37″W

Geography
- Location within Colorado Location within the United States
- Country: United States
- State: Colorado
- County: Eagle
- Protected area: Holy Cross Wilderness
- Parent range: Rocky Mountains; Sawatch Range
- Topo map: USGS Mount of the Holy Cross

Climbing
- Easiest route: class 2 hiking

Notch Mountain is a 13,243-foot-elevation (4,036-meter) summit in Eagle County, Colorado, United States.

== Description ==
Notch Mountain is set in the Sawatch Range and is located in the Holy Cross Wilderness, on land managed by White River National Forest. Precipitation runoff from the mountain's east slope drains into Fall Creek and the west slope drains to Cross Creek which are both tributaries of the Eagle River. Topographic relief is significant as the summit rises over 1,800 feet (549 m) above Lake Patricia in one-half mile (0.8 km) and over 3,500 feet (1,067 m) above Cross Creek in 1.7 mile (2.7 km). The Notch Mountain Trail covers 5.3 miles (8.5 km) and gains 2,930 feet of elevation as it leads to the iconic viewpoint of Mount of the Holy Cross.

== History ==
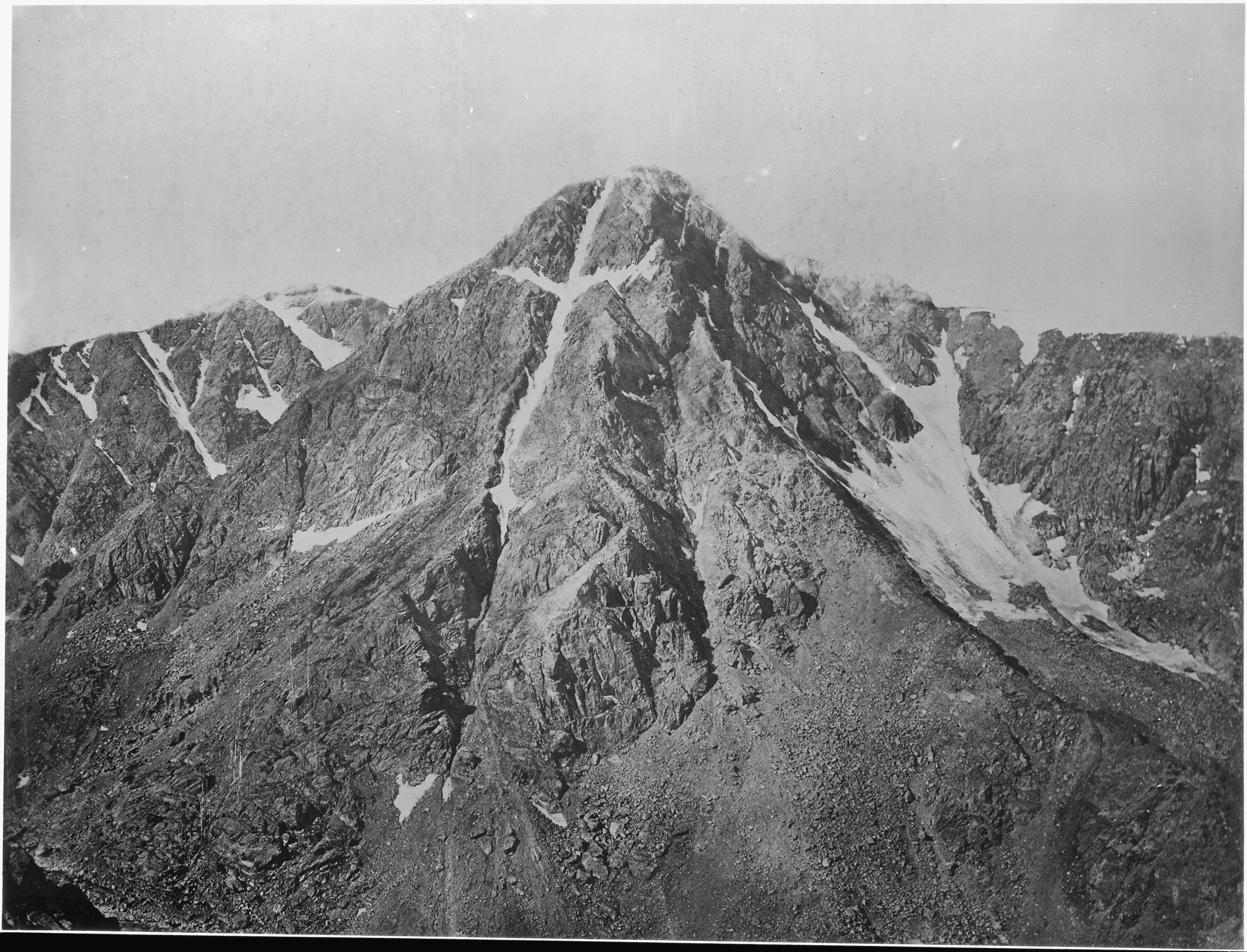
Mount of the Holy Cross in 1873 seen from Notch Mountain, by William Henry Jackson

Word of the enormous white cross of snow on Mount of the Holy Cross was first published in 1869 and the historic first photograph of the mountain was taken by William Henry Jackson from Notch Mountain on August 24, 1873, with the assistance of a survey party who carried the heavy photographic equipment. In 1874, Thomas Moran sketched Mount of the Holy Cross from the top of Notch Mountain, then later created an oil painting from the sketch. This led to the mountain becoming well-known, and from the late 1920s to the late 1930s people were making frequent pilgrimages to Notch Mountain to see the famous snowy cross on the northeast face of the neighboring mountain. A stone shelter was built on Notch Mountain in 1924 to protect these hundreds of visitors during storms. The shelter is on the National Register of Historic Places in Eagle County, Colorado. The mountain's toponym has been officially adopted by the United States Board on Geographic Names.

== Climate ==
According to the Köppen climate classification system, Notch Mountain is located in an alpine subarctic climate zone with cold, snowy winters, and cool to warm summers. Due to its altitude, it receives precipitation all year, as snow in winter and as thunderstorms in summer, with a dry period in late spring. Climbers can expect afternoon rain, hail, and lightning from the seasonal monsoon in late July and August.

== See also ==
- National Register of Historic Places listings in Eagle County, Colorado
- Thirteener

== Gallery ==
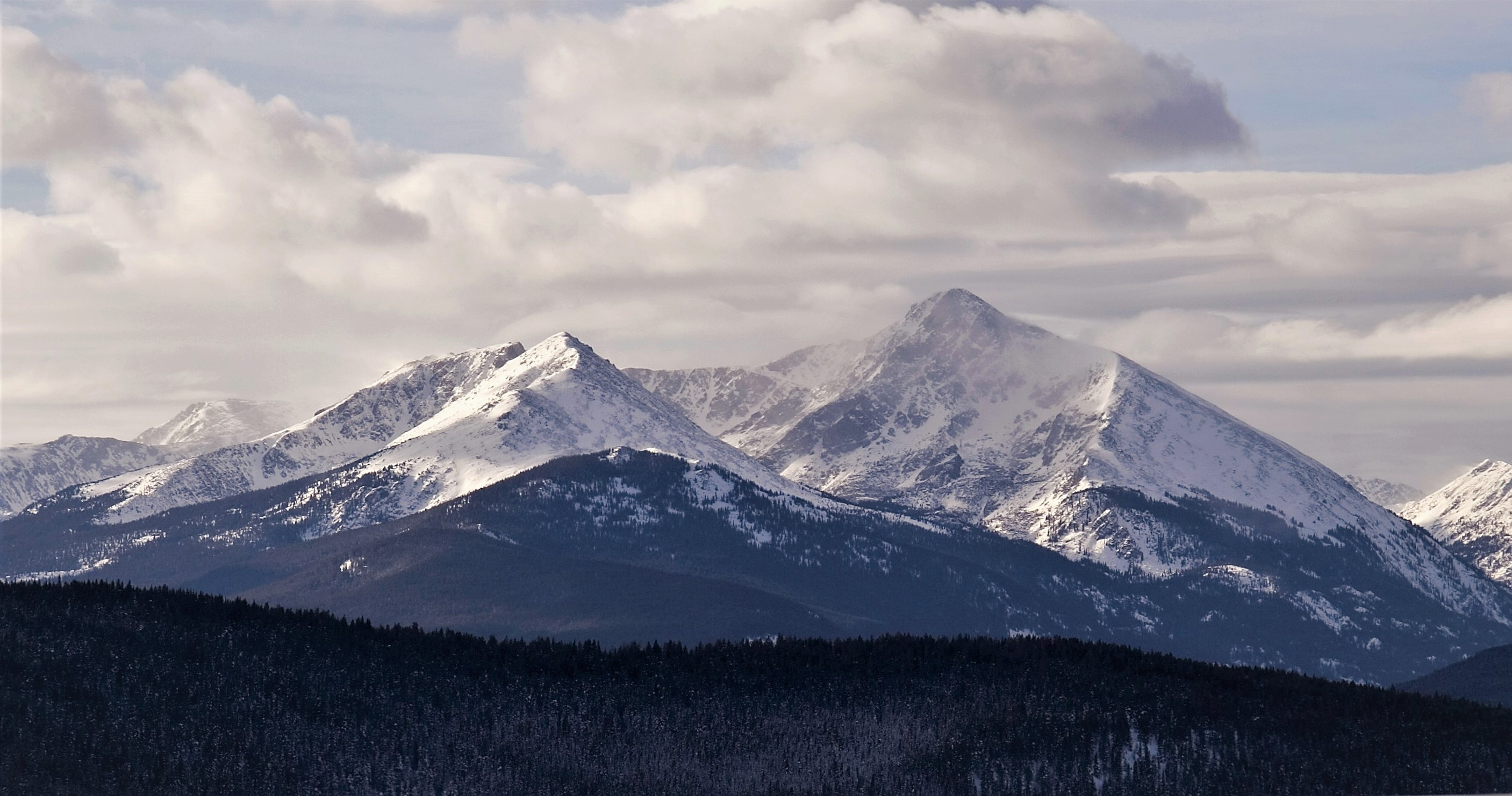
Notch Mountain (left) with Mount of the Holy Cross (right)

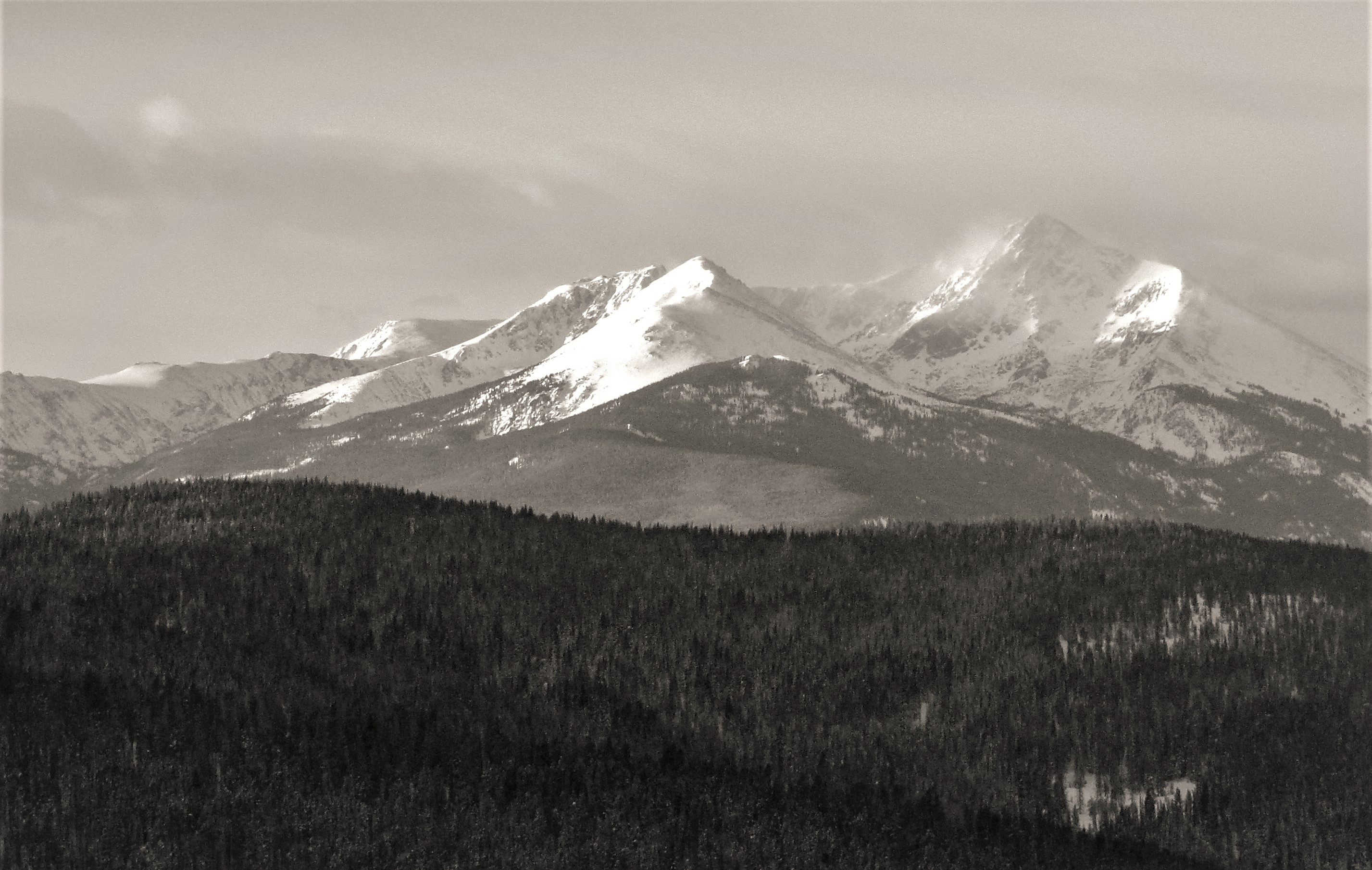
Notch Mountain centered, with Mount of the Holy Cross to right. Viewed from the NNE near Vail, Colorado.

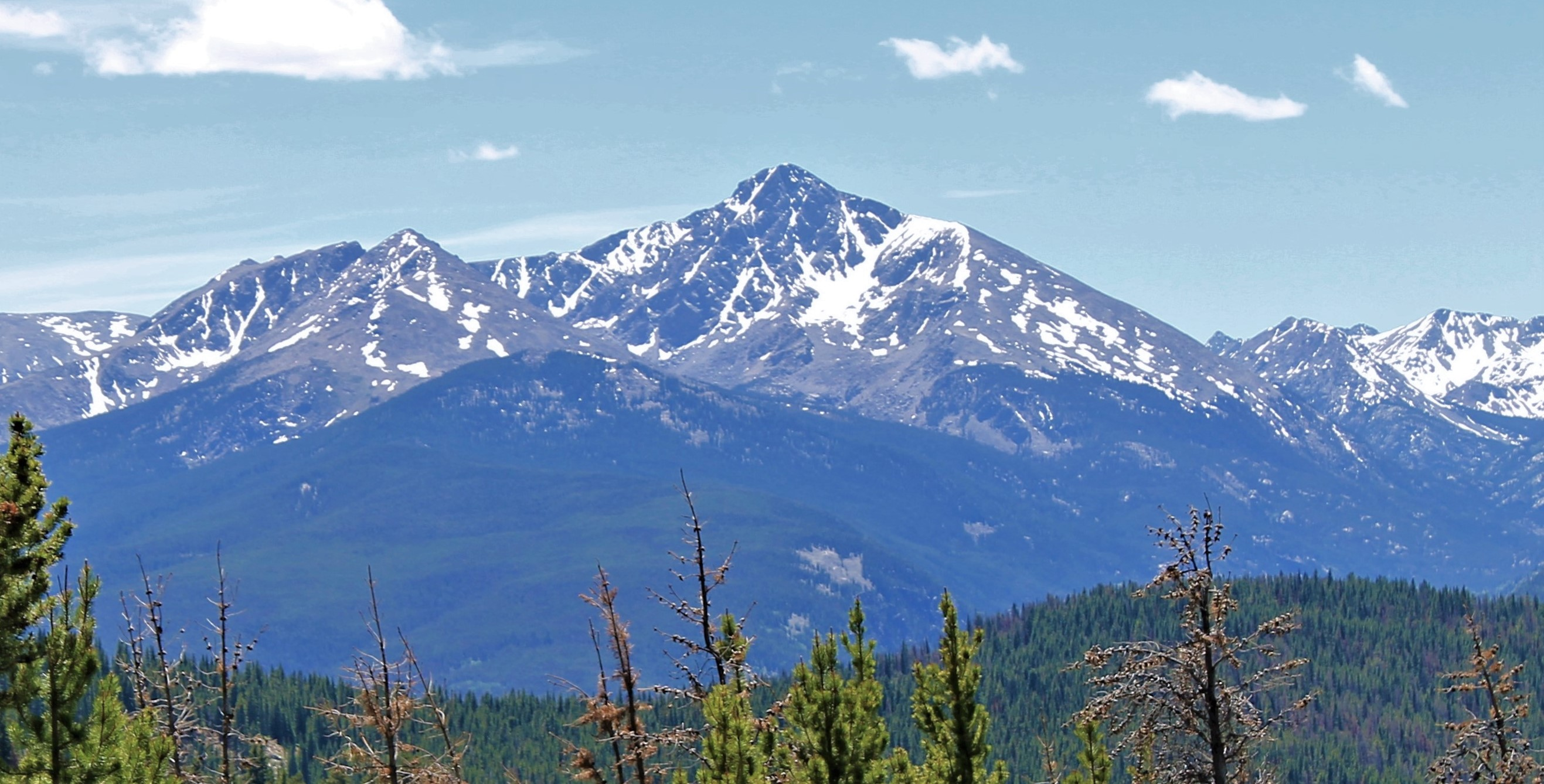
Mount of the Holy Cross centered with Notch Mountain to left.

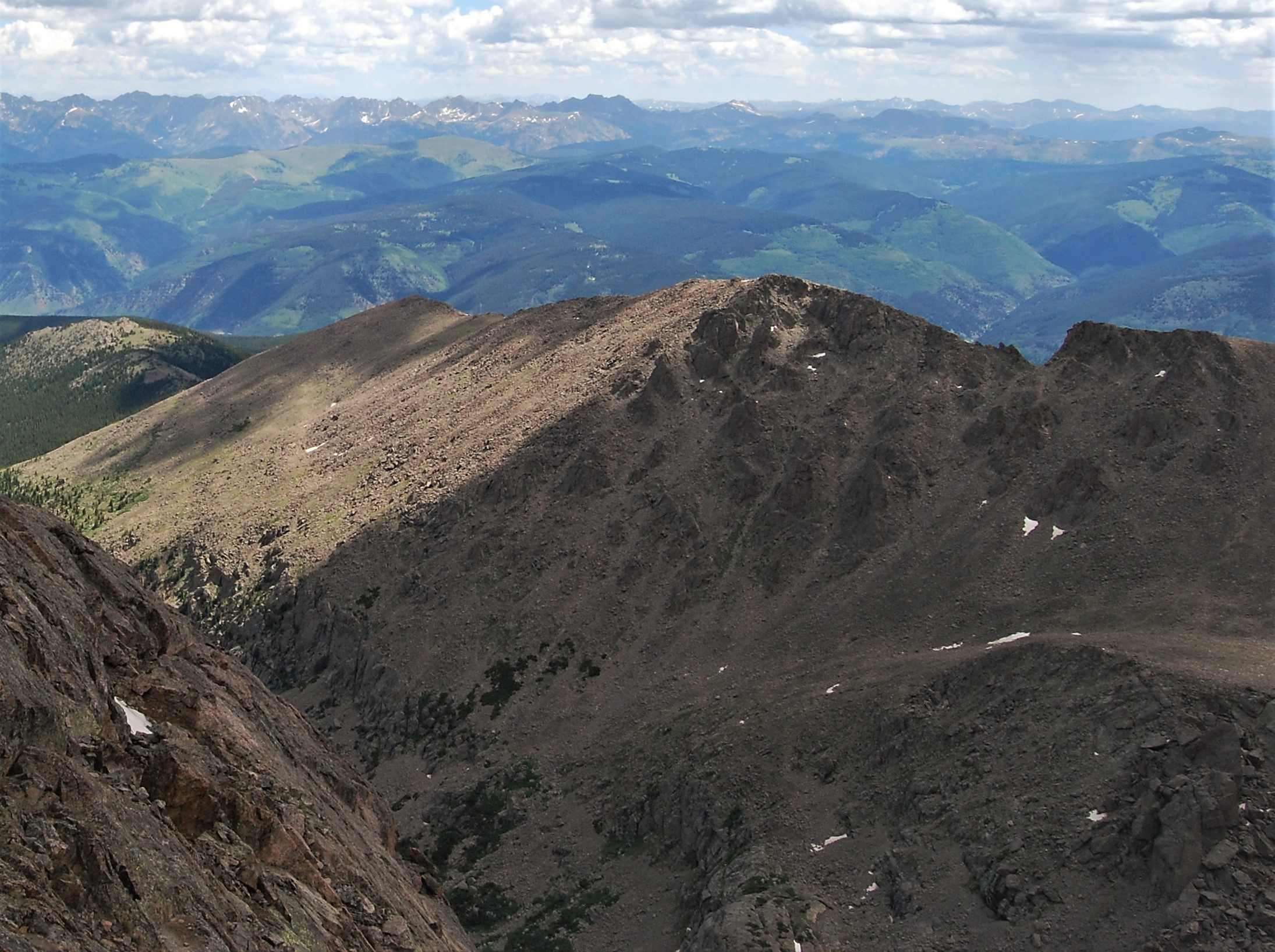
Notch Mountain viewed from Mount of the Holy Cross
