= Valerie Constien =

American athlete (born 1996)

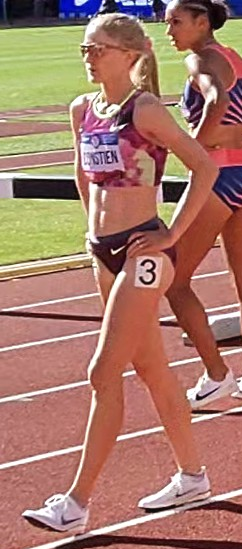
- Constien at the 2024 United States Olympic trials

Personal information
- Nationality: American
- Born: March 21, 1996 (age 30) Edwards, Colorado, U.S.
- Height: 5 ft 6 in (168 cm)

Sport
- Sport: Track and field
- Events: 3000 m steeplechase, Mile
- College team: Colorado Buffaloes
- Club: Nike
- Coached by: Mark Wetmore, Heather Burroughs

Achievements and titles
- Personal bests: 3000 m: 8:41.77 (Boston 2024); 3000 m steeplechase: 9:03.22 (Eugene 2024 Oly Trials)

Valerie Constien (born March 21, 1996) is an American track and field athlete and two-time Olympian.

== Career ==
Constien is from Vail, Colorado and a 2014 graduate of Battle Mountain High School. She attended the University of Colorado following high school in the hope of being an environmental engineer. Constien competes for the Tracksmith Amateur Support Program while being coached by Mark Wetmore and Heather Burroughs. In 2015, Constien ran at the IAAF World Cross Country Championships in Qingzhen, Guiyang finishing 62nd.

Constien finished third on June 24, 2021 in the 3000m steeplechase at the Olympic Trials in Eugene, Oregon behind Emma Coburn and Courtney Frerichs to secure her place at the delayed 2020 Summer Games. The race went to form as Constien was the United States’ third-fastest steeplechaser heading into the Olympic Trials with a personal best of 9:25. She also set a new personal best of 9:18.34 in the race. Constien qualified for the final at the Olympics in Tokyo and finished twelfth.

In 2023, Constien won the US national indoor 3000m title in Albuquerque, New Mexico. In April 2023, Constien signed a sponsorship deal with Nike. Unfortunately for Constien, competing at the 2023 Diamond League event in Doha in May 2023, she suffered a cruciate knee ligament injury which required surgery.

In 2024, Constien qualified for the Olympic Games in Paris by winning the 2024 U.S. Olympic Trials in the 3000 meters steeplechase. Competing in Paris in the 3000m steeplechase, she qualified for the final, and placed 15th overall.

She finished tenth in the 3000m steeplechase in May 2025 at the 2025 Doha Diamond League. She reached the final of the 3000 metres steeplechase at the 2025 USA Outdoor Track and Field Championships.
