= Sylvan Fire =

2021 wildfire in Colorado

- Part of the 2021 Colorado wildfires
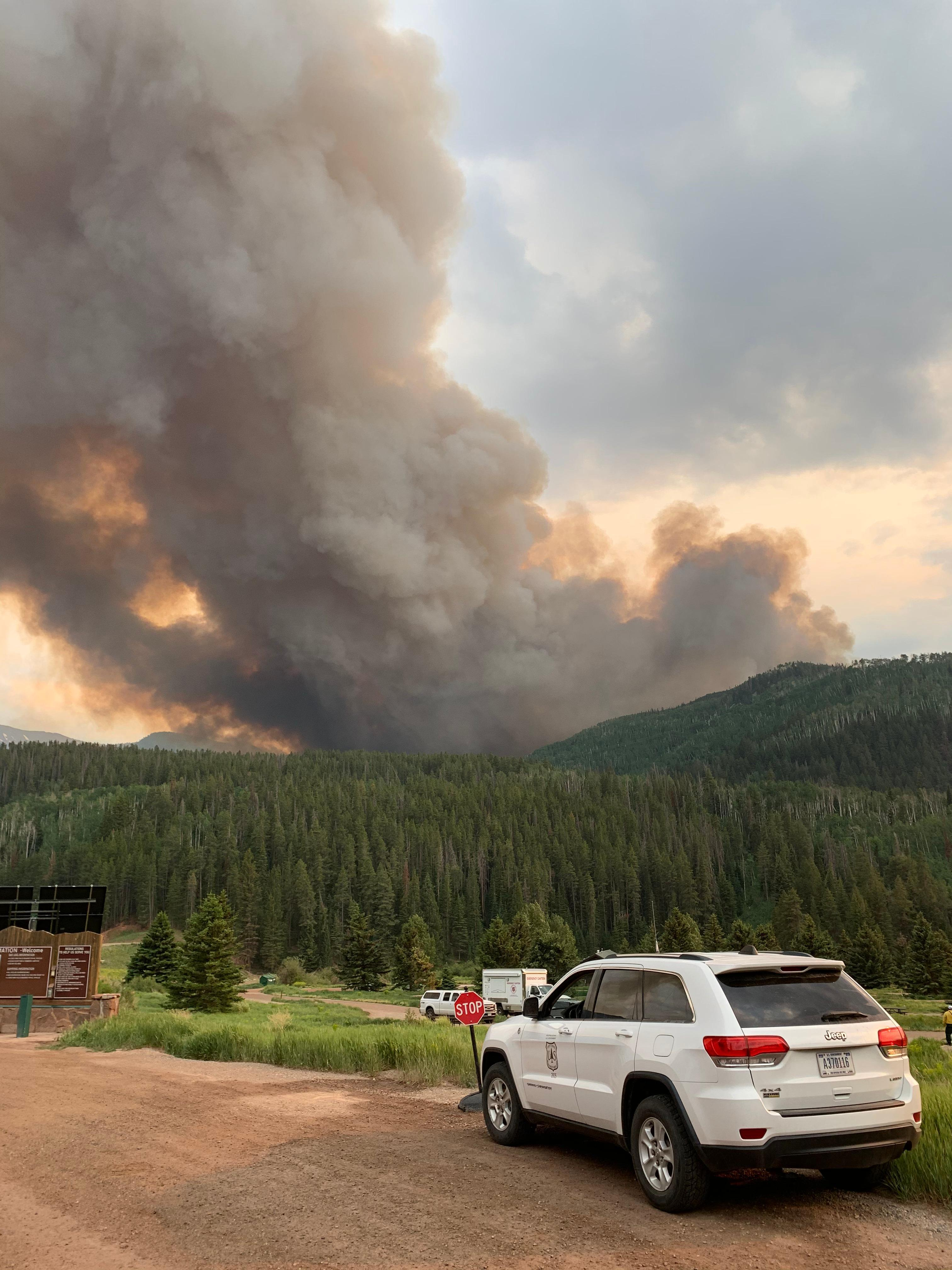
- The Sylvan fire burning on June 20, 2021
- Date: June 20, 2021 – October 14, 2021
- Location: Sylvan Lake State Park, Colorado
- Coordinates: 39.503°N 106.768°W

Statistics
- Burned area: 3,792 acres (1,535 ha)

Ignition
- Cause: Lightning

Map
- Location in Western Colorado

The Sylvan Fire was a wildfire that started in the Sylvan Lake State Park in Colorado on June 20, 2021. The fire burned 3,792 acres (1,535 ha) and was fully contained on October 14, 2021.

== Events ==
=== June ===
The Sylvan Fire was first reported on June 20, 2021 at around 3:15 pm MST.

=== Cause ===
The cause of the fire is believed to be due to lightning.

=== Containment ===
On October 14, 2021, the Sylvan Fire reached 100% containment.

== See also ==
- 2021 Colorado wildfires
- List of Colorado wildfires
