= Holy Cross City, Colorado =

Ghost town in Eagle County, Colorado

Holy Cross City
- Ghost town
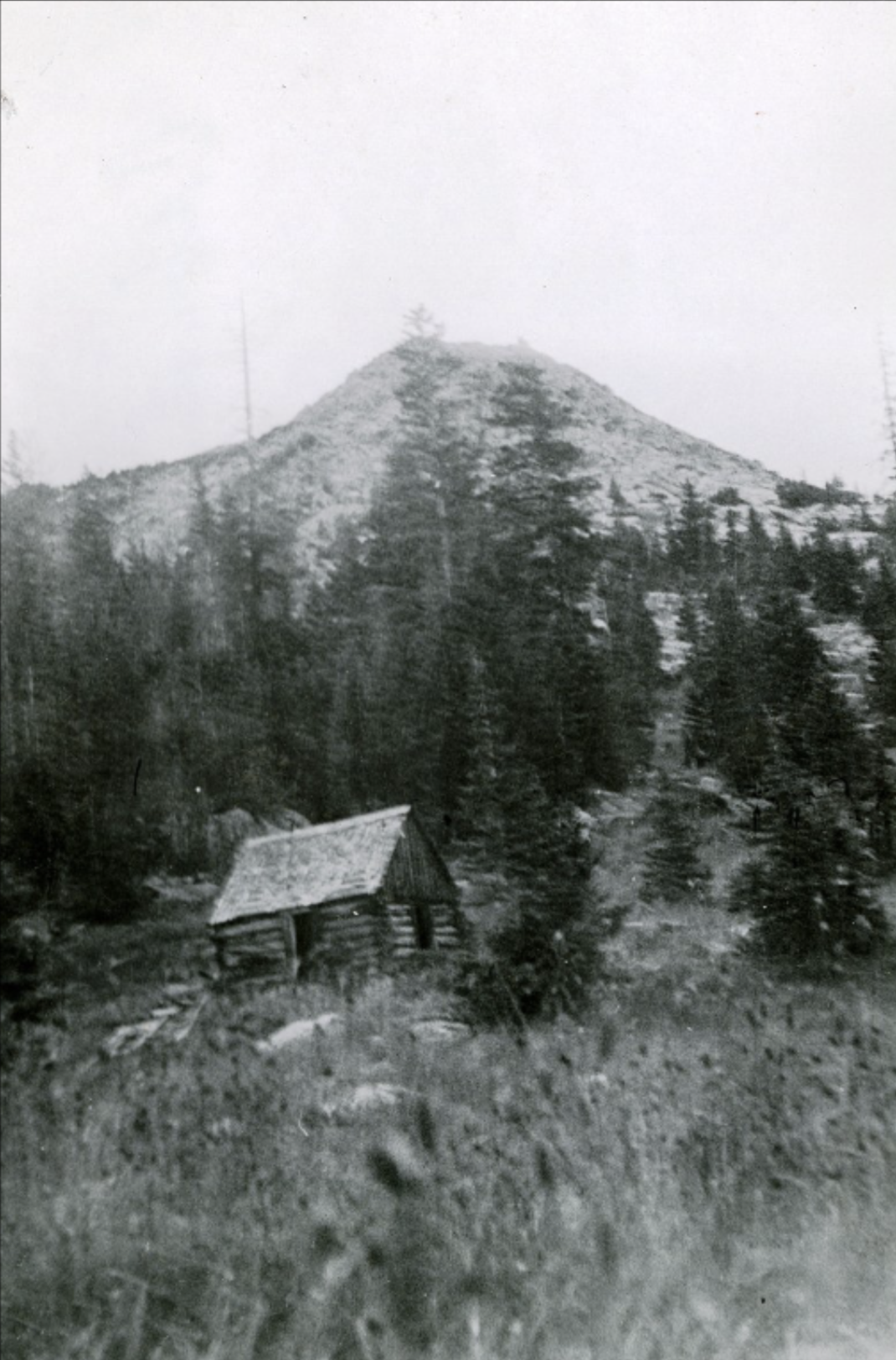
- Cabin in Holy Cross City

- Location within the state of Colorado
- Coordinates: 39.4150°N 106.4781°W
- Country: United States
- State: Colorado
- County: Eagle
- Elevation: 11,428 ft (3,483 m)

Population (2010)
  - Total: 0
- Time zone: UTC-7 (Mountain (MST))
  - Summer (DST): UTC-6 (MDT)
- ZIP codes: 81645
- GNIS feature ID: 179537

Holy Cross City (also known as Holy Cross) is an extinct town located in Eagle County, Colorado, United States. Holy Cross City got its name from Mount of the Holy Cross, located nearby. The Holy Cross post office operated from January 23, 1882, until February 8, 1899, and from December 7, 1904, until August 7, 1905. Presently, the former townsite is located along Holy Cross City Trail within Holy Cross Wilderness, part of White River National Forest. The Mount of the Holy Cross is not visible from the townsite.

== History ==
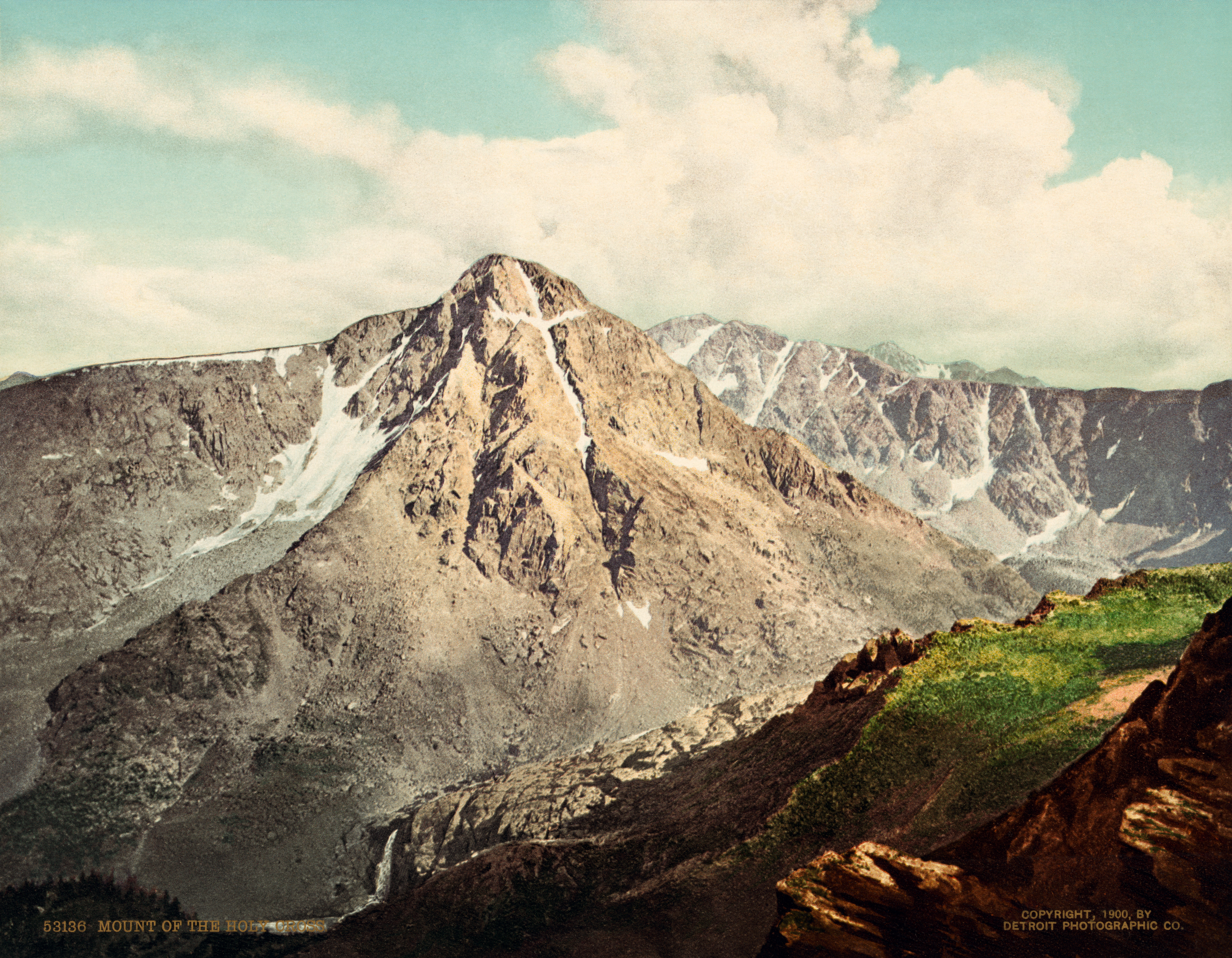
Mount of the Holy Cross in 1900, the mountain for which the city is named.

Discovery of valuable deposits of lead, manganese, and trace amounts of gold made the Holy Cross Mining District a densely mined region in the 1880s. The town was populated between 1880 and 1884, with a peak population of 300, though the mines ceased being profitable in 1883. A brief repopulation of the town occurred in the 1890s as the mines were worked for a short time.

At its peak, the city contained a post office, boarding houses, a hotel, as well as other amenities. Only small remnants of the town remain, with four scattered cabins comprising the largest standing structures as of 2017.

The trail, constructed in 1883, remains accessible but is extremely rocky and only traversable by highly modified four-wheel drive vehicles. It provides vistas of the Mount of the Holy Cross and terminates just short of Cleveland Lake and Hunky Dory Lake.

== See also ==
- List of ghost towns in Colorado
