= Mount of the Holy Cross =

Mountain in Colorado, United States

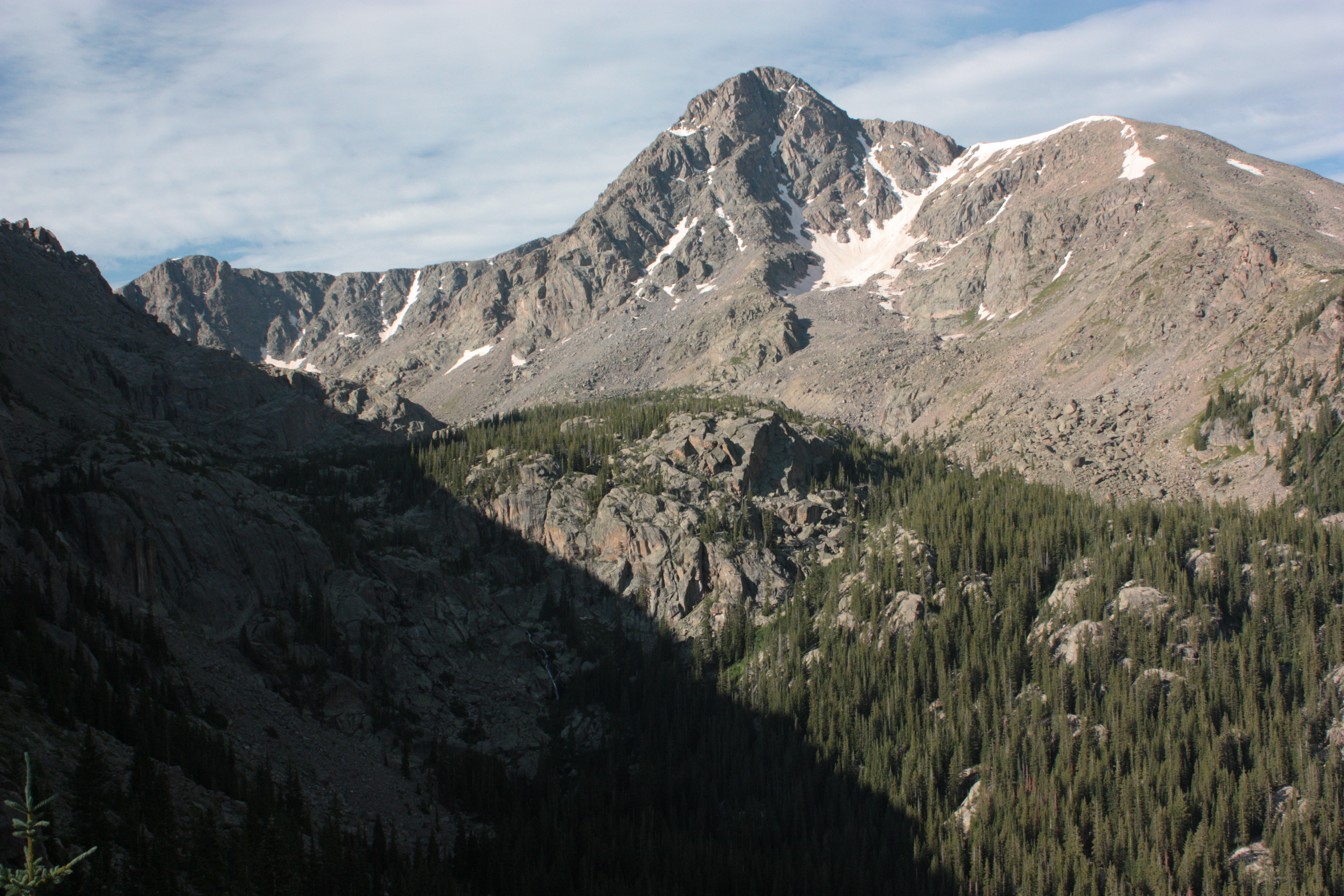
- Mount of the Holy Cross, 2009

Highest point
- Elevation: 14,005.2 ft (4,268.8 m); NAPGD2022
- Prominence: 2113 ft (644 m)
- Isolation: 18.41 mi (29.6 km)
- Listing: North America highest peaks 59th; US highest major peaks 45th; Colorado highest major peaks 25th; Colorado fourteeners 52nd; Colorado county high points 20th

Geography
- Location within Colorado
- Location: High point of Eagle County, Colorado, United States
- Parent range: Sawatch Range
- Topo map(s): USGS 7.5' topographic map Mount of the Holy Cross, Colorado

Climbing
- First ascent: August 1873 James Gardner and W.H. Holmes
- Easiest route: North Ridge: Hike, class 2

Mount of the Holy Cross is a high and prominent mountain summit in the northern Sawatch Range of the Rocky Mountains of North America. The 14,005-foot (4268.80 m) fourteener is located in the Holy Cross Wilderness of White River National Forest, 6.6 miles (10.7 km) west-southwest (bearing 244°) of the Town of Red Cliff in Eagle County, Colorado, United States. The summit of Mount of the Holy Cross is the highest point in Eagle County and the northern Sawatch Range.

== Mountain ==
Mount of the Holy Cross was named for the distinctive cross-shaped snowfield on its northeast face. On May 11, 1929. President Herbert Hoover designated the area surrounding the mountain as Holy Cross National Monument under United States Forest Service administration. The monument was transferred to the National Park Service in 1933. The mountain's remote location made tourism difficult, and on August 3, 1950, President Harry Truman signed an act abolishing the national monument and returning the area to White River National Forest. The former national monument is now a part of the Holy Cross Wilderness.

This mountain has been the subject of painters, photographers and even a poem by Henry Wadsworth Longfellow, ("The Cross of Snow"). The first publicly available photograph was published in National Geographic magazine. Thomas Moran depicted the mountain in an oil painting, which now is part of the collection of the Museum of the American West, part of the Autry National Center in Los Angeles, California. It is still much photographed but it is not as well known today as it was in the past.

Nearby features include Bowl of Tears Lake, directly under the east face of the peak, Tuhare Lakes, in a cirque that lies south of a significant subpeak, and several other lakes. Notable locations within 35 mi (56 km) include the Dotsero volcano (near Interstate 70), Vail and Aspen. US 24 runs near the peak through Gilman.

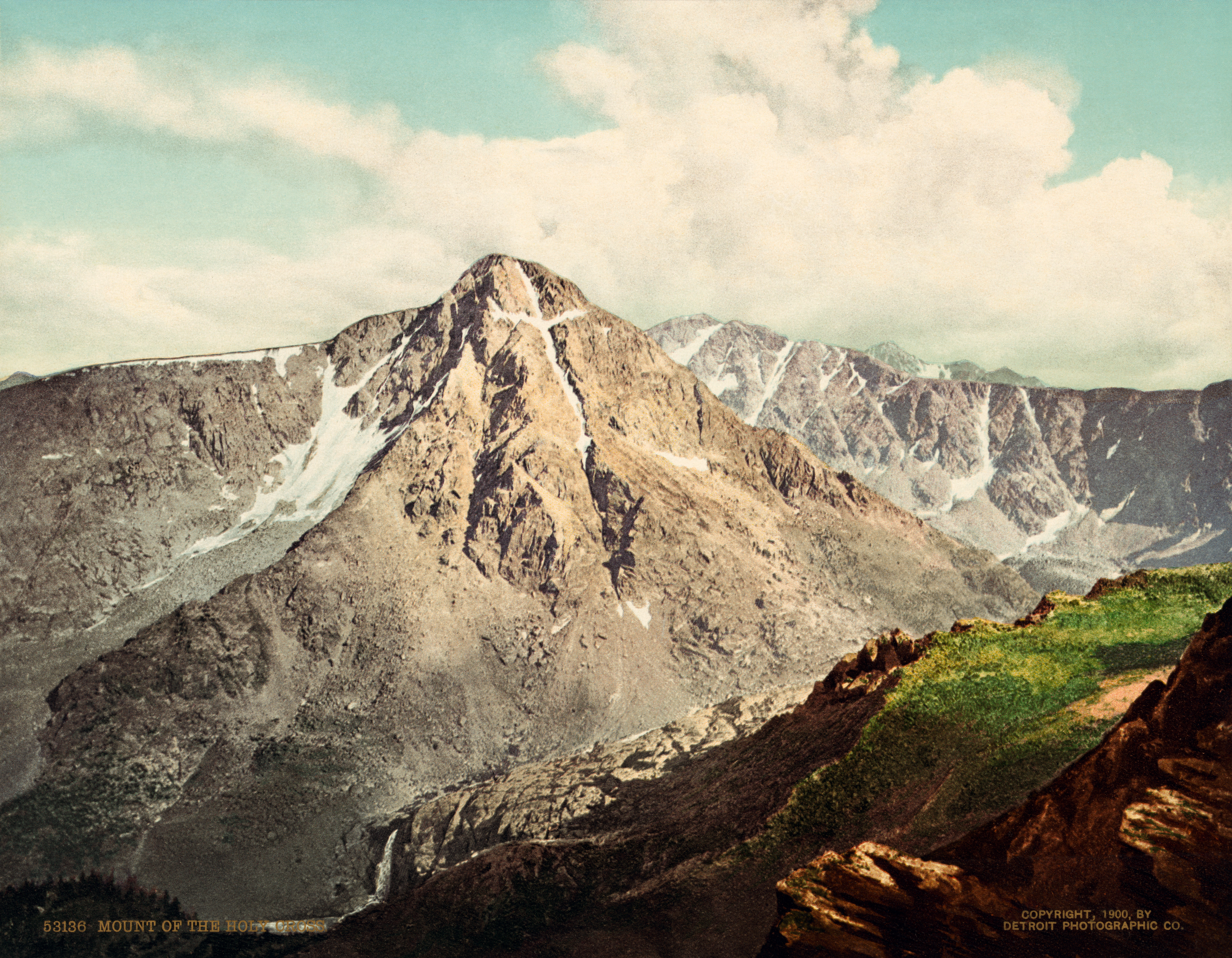
Photochrom print of Mount of the Holy Cross c. 1900. This image is a reversed view of the mountain compared to how it actually appears.

The first recorded ascent of Holy Cross was in 1873, by F. V. Hayden and photographer W. H. Jackson during one of Hayden's geographical surveys. However, the peak may well have been ascended previously by miners or American Indians. The first winter ascent of the peak was made in 1943 by Russel Keene and Howard Freedman of the 10th Mountain Division, then stationed at Camp Hale.

The mining town of Holy Cross City was established in 1880 to serve the growing mining operations around the region. In 1883, the Holy Cross City Trail was built to the town, but the town was depopulated from a peak of 600 people the next year.

Holy Cross can be climbed by at least four different routes, with the easiest and most common route being the North Ridge, which involves 5,000 feet (1,500 m) of vertical gain over 11.5 mi (18.5 km) and is rated YDS Class 2 for moderate scrambling. The Cross Couloir route forms the vertical portion of the famous cross feature, and provides an advanced snow climb or extreme ski descent.

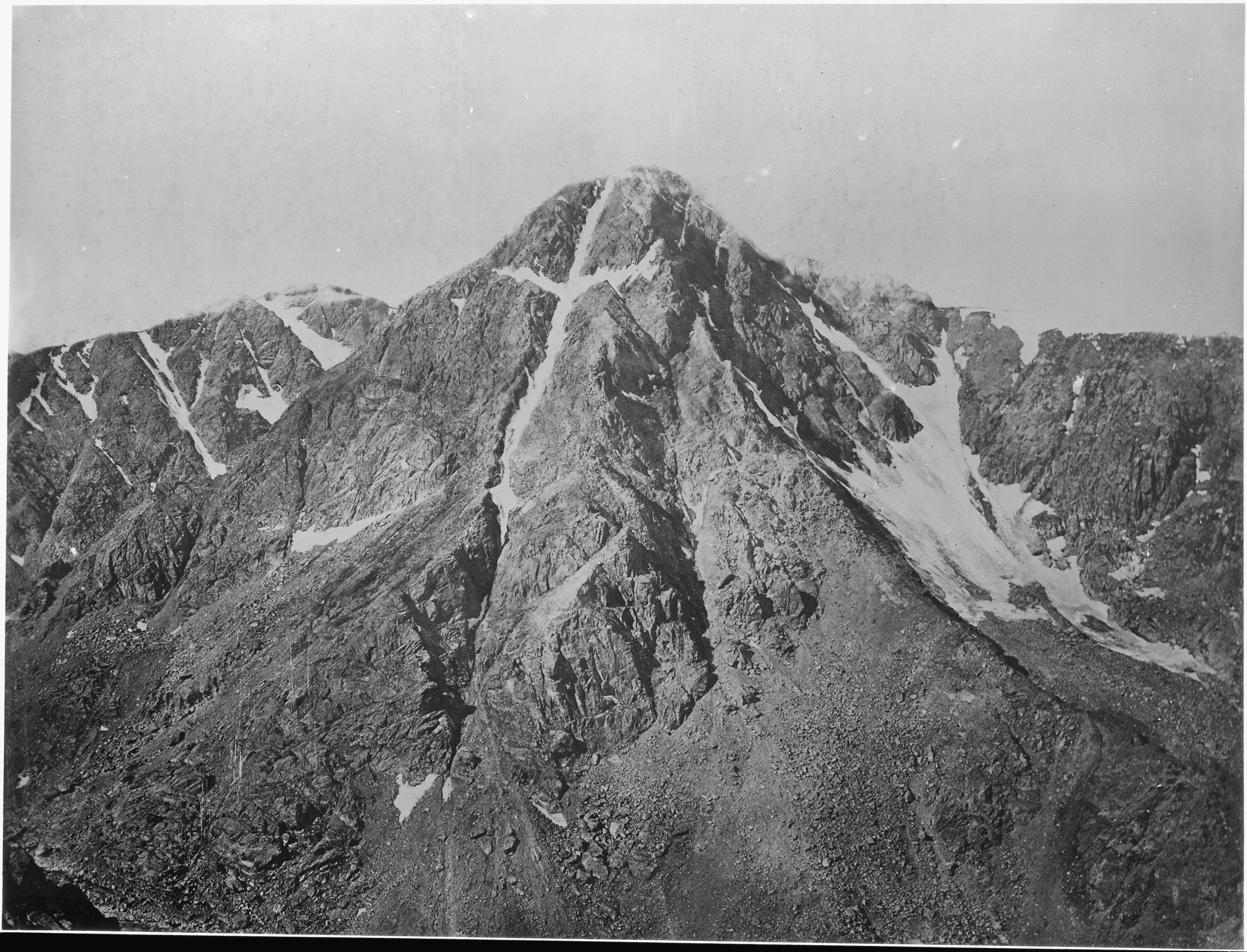
Photo by William Henry Jackson ~ circa 1873

Mount of the Holy Cross has a history of endangering the lives of many hikers. Although the summit on Mount of the Holy Cross is frequently reached on a long day hike, hikers have become stranded or lost through missing the right turn down the ridgeline, heading straight down and into the wilderness; research and planning of the route is important to prevent tragedies. Efforts to improve safety have been made by the Colorado Fourteeners Initiative.

Mount of the Holy Cross is accessible from Tigiwon Road, south of Minturn, Colorado. The Half Moon Pass Trail is the standard route to the summit of Mount of the Holy Cross via the North Ridge. Following the Fall Creek Trail to an ascent of Notch Mountain Trail provides the best view of the Holy Cross snow feature from Notch Mountain Ridge.

== Climate ==
Climate data for Mount of the Holy Cross 39.4664 N, 106.4813 W, Elevation: 13,428 ft (4,093 m) (1991–2020 normals)
Month	Jan	Feb	Mar	Apr	May	Jun	Jul	Aug	Sep	Oct	Nov	Dec	Year
Mean daily maximum °F (°C)	21.0 (−6.1)	20.3 (−6.5)	25.7 (−3.5)	31.5 (−0.3)	40.0 (4.4)	51.5 (10.8)	57.7 (14.3)	55.6 (13.1)	49.0 (9.4)	37.9 (3.3)	27.4 (−2.6)	21.1 (−6.1)	36.6 (2.5)
Daily mean °F (°C)	9.7 (−12.4)	8.7 (−12.9)	13.5 (−10.3)	18.7 (−7.4)	27.4 (−2.6)	38.0 (3.3)	44.1 (6.7)	42.6 (5.9)	36.1 (2.3)	26.0 (−3.3)	16.6 (−8.6)	10.2 (−12.1)	24.3 (−4.3)
Mean daily minimum °F (°C)	−1.5 (−18.6)	−3.0 (−19.4)	1.3 (−17.1)	5.9 (−14.5)	14.8 (−9.6)	24.4 (−4.2)	30.6 (−0.8)	29.6 (−1.3)	23.2 (−4.9)	14.0 (−10.0)	5.9 (−14.5)	−0.7 (−18.2)	12.0 (−11.1)
Average precipitation inches (mm)	3.50 (89)	3.16 (80)	3.43 (87)	4.37 (111)	3.21 (82)	1.47 (37)	2.23 (57)	2.32 (59)	2.19 (56)	2.56 (65)	3.00 (76)	2.90 (74)	34.34 (873)
Source: PRISM Climate Group

== Historical names ==
- Mount Holy Cross
- Mount of the Holy Cross – 1947

== See also ==
- List of mountain peaks of North America
  - List of mountain peaks of the United States
    - List of mountain peaks of Colorado
      - List of Colorado county high points
      - List of Colorado fourteeners
