= Woods Lake Resort =

- U.S. National Register of Historic Places
- Location within Colorado
- Nearest city: Thomasville, Colorado
- Coordinates: 39°25′32″N 106°37′35″W
- Area: 319.8 acres (129.4 ha)
- Architectural style: Rustic
- NRHP reference No.: 88001226
- Added to NRHP: August 11, 1988

The Woods Lake Resort, in Eagle County, Colorado near Thomasville, Colorado, was listed on the National Register of Historic Places in 1988.

It is a rustic-style resort which was famous for its fishing, in the two lakes and connecting stream in the area. The listing included 28 contributing buildings and two contributing sites on 319.8 acres (129.4 ha).

It is located on Woods Lake, 11 miles (18 km) north of Thomasville, and is surrounded by White River National Forest.
