= Burns, Colorado =

Unincorporated community in Eagle County, Colorado, United States

- Unincorporated community
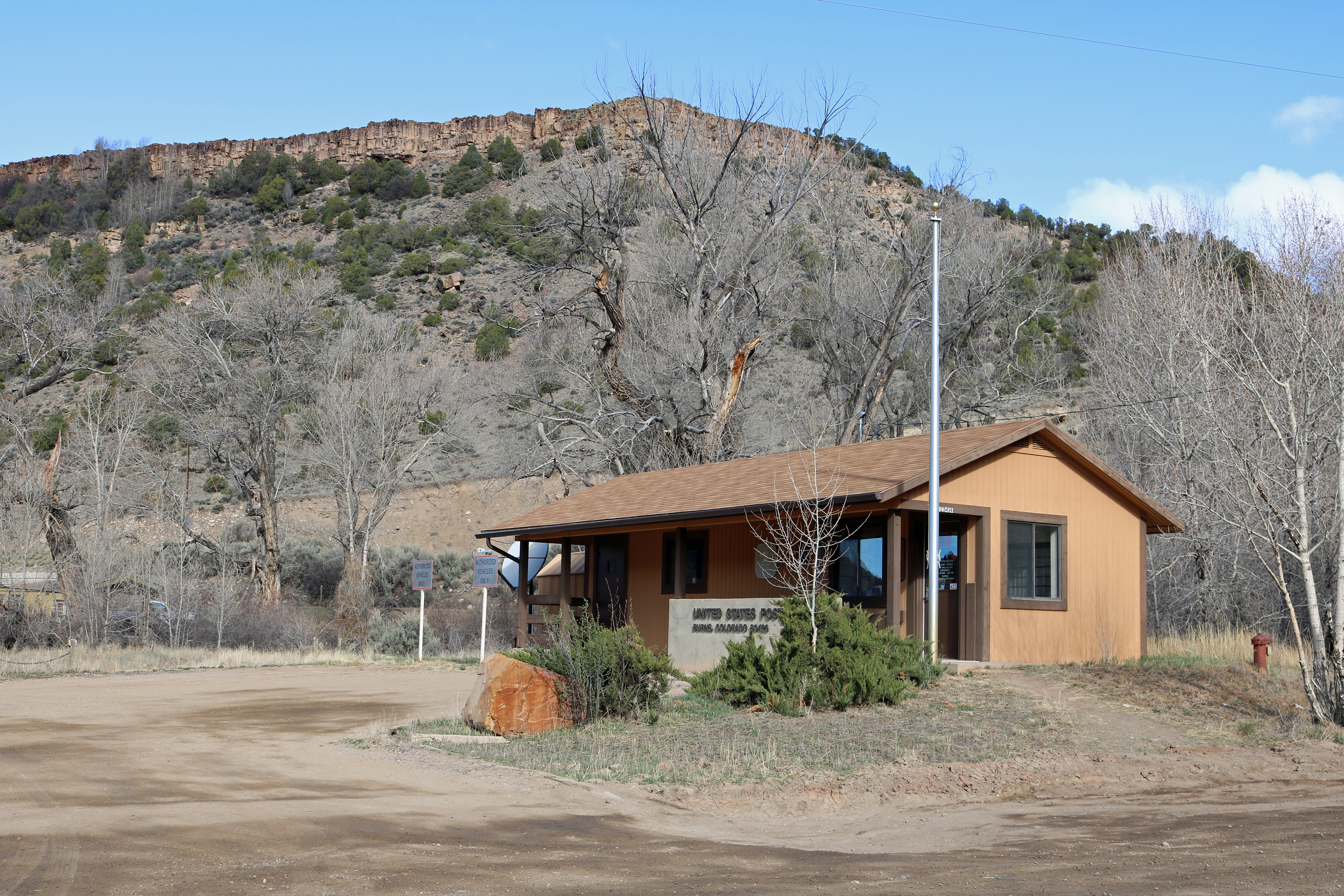
- The post office in Burns.

- Location of the Town of Burns, Colorado. Burns (Colorado)
- Coordinates: 39°52′28″N 106°53′20″W
- Country: United States
- State: Colorado
- County: Eagle County

Government
  - Type: Unincorporated community
  - Body: Eagle County
- Elevation: 6,493 ft (1,979 m)
- Time zone: UTC−07:00 (MST)
  - Summer (DST): UTC−06:00 (MDT)
- ZIP code: 80426
- GNIS pop ID: 202318

Burns is an unincorporated community in northern Eagle County, Colorado, United States.

== History ==
The Burns, Colorado, post office opened on May 14, 1895. The town is named for Jack Burns, a trapper who built a cabin in the area.

== See also ==
- Edwards, CO Micropolitan Statistical Area
