= Oil Springs Fire =

2021 wildfire in Colorado

- Part of the 2021 Colorado wildfires
- Date: June 18, 2021 – July 10, 2021
- Location: Grand Junction, Colorado
- Coordinates: 39.45°N 108.53°W

Statistics
- Burned area: 12,613 acres (5,104 ha)

Impacts
- Structures lost: 1

Ignition
- Cause: Lightning

Map
- Location in Western Colorado

The Oil Springs Fire was a wildfire that started north of Grand Junction, Colorado on June 18, 2021. The fire burned 12,613 acres (5,104 ha) and was fully contained on July 10, 2021.

== Events ==
=== June ===
The Oil Springs Fire was first reported on June 18, 2021, at around 6:45 pm MDT.

=== Cause ===
The cause of the fire is believed to be due to lightning.

=== Containment ===
On July 10, 2021, the Oil Springs Fire reached 100% containment.

== See also ==
- 2021 Colorado wildfires
- List of Colorado wildfires
