= Muddy Slide Fire =

2021 wildfire in Colorado

- Part of the 2021 Colorado wildfires
- Date: June 20, 2021 – September 14, 2021
- Location: Yampa, Colorado
- Coordinates: 40.143°N 106.798°W

Statistics
- Burned area: 4,093 acres (1,656 ha)

Impacts
- Structures lost: 18

Ignition
- Cause: Lightning

Map
- Location in Western Colorado

The Muddy Slide Fire was a wildfire that started near Yampa, Colorado, United States, on June 20, 2021. The fire burned 4,093 acres (1,656 ha) and was fully contained on September 14, 2021.

== Events ==
=== June ===
The Muddy Slide Fire was first reported on June 20, 2021 at around 3:00 pm MST.

=== Cause ===
The cause of the fire is believed to be due to lightning.

=== Containment ===
On September 14, 2021, the fire reached 100% containment.

== See also ==
- 2021 Colorado wildfires
- List of Colorado wildfires
