= Belden, Colorado =

Ghost town in Eagle County, Colorado, United States

Belden
- Ghost town
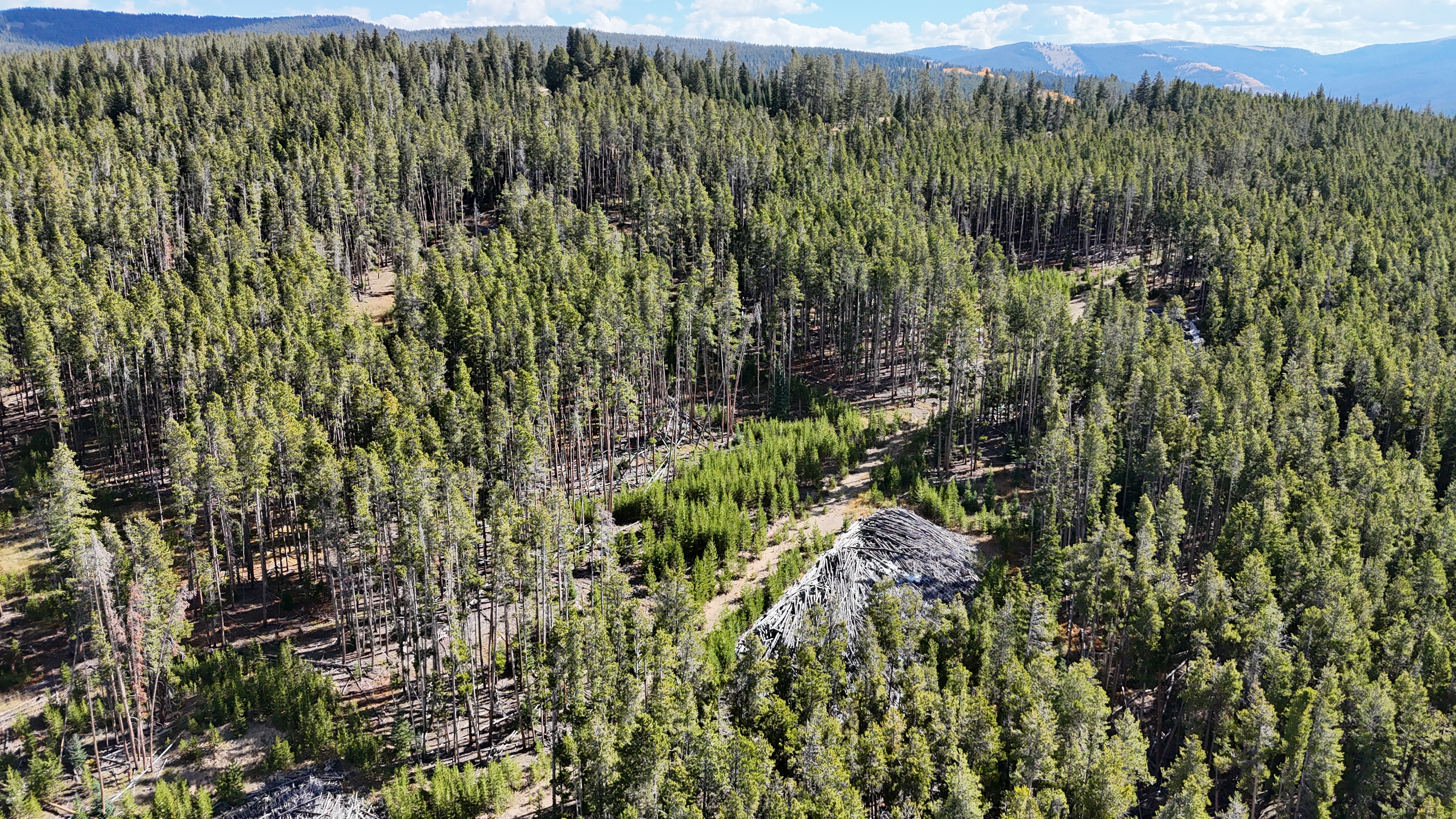
- Site of Belden, Colorado, September 2024. This is an aerial view of a dense forest landscape. The forest consists mostly of tall, green coniferous trees.

- Location of Belden, Colorado. Belden (Colorado)
- Coordinates: 39°31′32″N 106°23′10″W
- Country: United States
- State: Colorado
- County: Eagle
- Elevation: 9,646 ft (2,940 m)
- Time zone: UTC−07:00 (MST)
  - Summer (DST): UTC−06:00 (MDT)
- GNIS pop ID: 176127

Belden is an extinct town located in Eagle County, Colorado, United States.

The community was named after D. D. Belden, the proprietor of a local mine. Belden never had a post office.

== See also ==
- List of ghost towns in Colorado
