= Eagle County Charter Academy =

Location
- 1105 Miller Ranch Road; Wolcott, Eagle County, Colorado 81631; United States; 39.6413°N 106.5690°W

Information
- Opened: 1994
- Principal: Kim Walter
- Grades: Kindergarten through 8th Grade
- Colors: Red and Black
- Mascot: Hawk
- Nickname: ECCA
- Team name: Hawks
- Website: www.ecca.org

Eagle County Charter Academy is a K-8 charter school located in Edwards, Colorado. It opened in the 1994 school year with grades 5–7, adding 8th grade the next year, 1-4 by 2001 and Kindergarten in 2004. It has been recognized as a John Irwin School of Excellence. In 2004-2008 it received a grade of 'Excellent' from the state, based upon the performance of its students in the Colorado Student Assessment Program. There are 16-21 students in each class, creating grades of 32-42 kids.
