= Red Cliff Bridge =

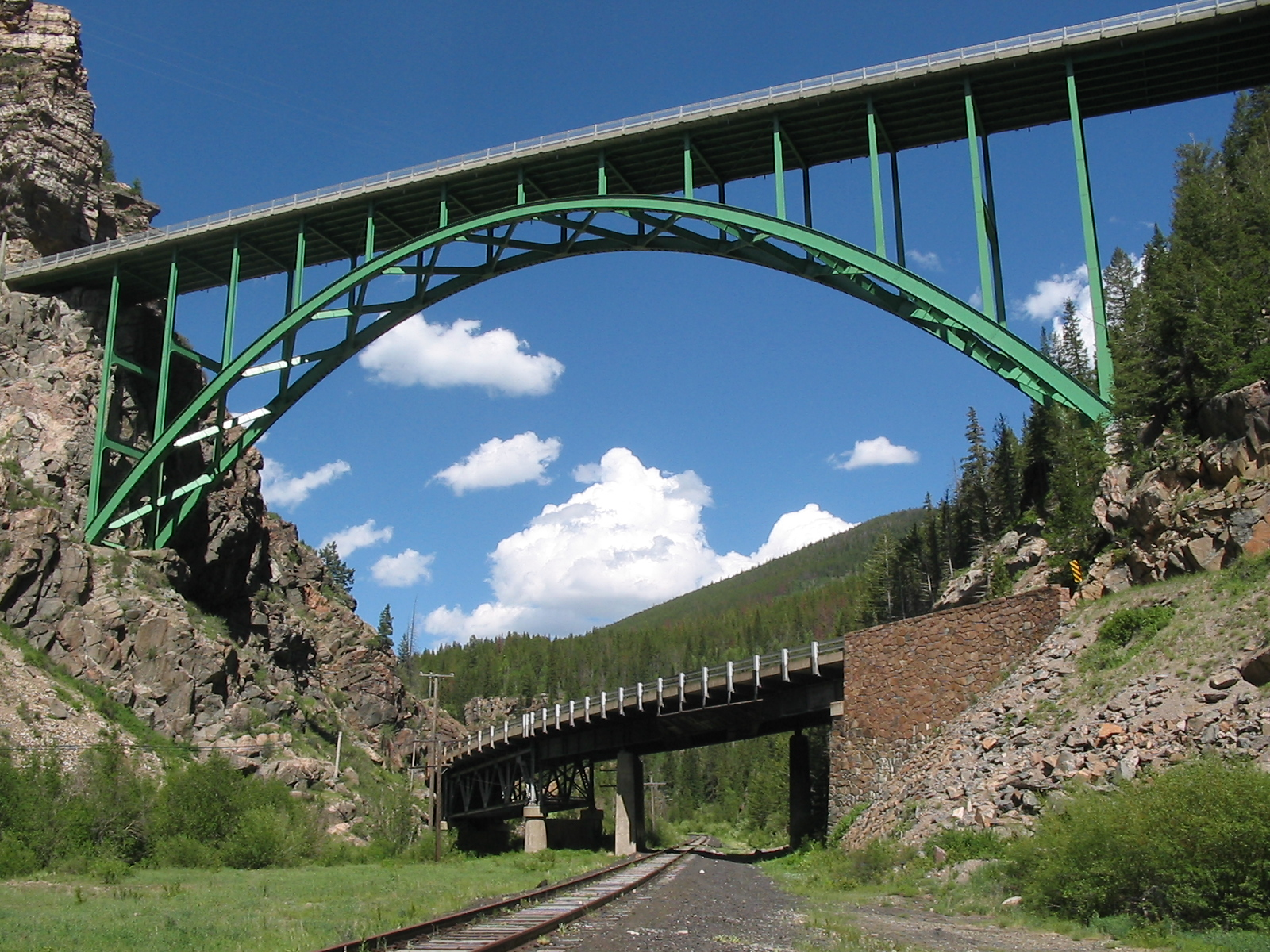
- Red Cliff Bridge (foreground)
- Coordinates: 39°30′30″N 106°22′36″W
- Carries: US 24
- Crosses: Eagle River
- Locale: Red Cliff, Colorado

Characteristics
- Design: cantilevered steel arch bridge
- Total length: 471 ft (144 m)
- Width: 30 ft (9.1 m)
- Height: 200 ft (61 m) (approximate)
- Longest span: 318 ft (97 m)

History
- Architect: King Burghardt
- Constructed by: F.M. Kenney
- Fabrication by: Minnesota-Moline Power Implement Company
- Construction start: 1939
- Construction end: 1940
- Construction cost: $372,407 (equivalent to $6.3 million in 2023 dollars)
- Opened: 1941

Red Cliff Bridge also called the Green Bridge or originally called the "Silver Bridge" by locals for its original silver color before being re-painted green as it remains today, is a cantilevered steel arch bridge located about 0.5 mi (0.80 km) southwest of the town of Red Cliff, Colorado, one of Colorado's iconic bridges. The bridge carries U.S. Highway 24 over the Eagle River, as well as a county road, and the former Union Pacific Railroad track that heads south toward Tennessee Pass and the city of Leadville. One of only two steel arch bridges within Colorado, Red Cliff Bridge has been listed on the National Register of Historic Places since 1985 and is the state's only cantilevered steel arch bridge.

The bridge was designed by King Burghardt, an engineer at the Colorado Department of Highways, and built by contractor P.M. Kenney in 1940, using steel components fabricated by the Minnesota-Moline Power Implement Company. Construction was difficult, with workers hanging over a 200 ft (61 m) drop while working in temperatures that sometimes dipped below 0 °F (−18 °C). Burghardt wrote in his journal, "In the morning, each gang was lifted to its scaffold on a platform hung from the high line. They took their lunches with them and spent the entire day in the air with the winter wind continually blowing up the canyon."

After more than 60 years since its construction, the bridge had deteriorated to the point that major restoration work was required. The work was completed between March and November 2004 at a cost of $3.6 million, with $1.6 million coming from the Federal Highway Administration. The bridge deck was replaced and widened and much of the steel was repainted. However, because of the bridge's historic status, care was taken to maintain the visual aesthetic. The rehabilitation effort won the 2005 National Steel Bridge Alliance Prize Bridge Award for the year's best reconstructed bridge.

== See also ==
- List of bridges in the United States by height
- National Register of Historic Places listings in Eagle County, Colorado
