= Battle Mountain High School (Colorado) =

Location
- 0151 Miller Ranch Rd; Edwards, Colorado 81632; United States; 39°38′42″N 106°35′00″W

Information
- Type: Public high school
- Established: 1963 (63 years ago)
- School district: Eagle County School District
- CEEB code: 061010
- Principal: Jason Mills
- Faculty: 58
- Teaching staff: 60.22 (FTE)
- Grades: 9–12
- Enrollment: 946 (2023–2024)
- Student to teacher ratio: 15.71
- Colors: Gold and black
- Athletics conference: Colorado Division 3-A
- Mascot: Husky
- Team name: The Battle Mountain Huskies
- Website: bmhs.eagleschools.net

Battle Mountain High School is a secondary school in Eagle County, Colorado, United States. (BMHS)

The school was originally built in 1975 in the town of Eagle-Vail. Prior to that, it was a combined middle school/high school near Battle Mountain Pass, close to the town of Minturn. In 2010, it was relocated to a new campus further west in the town of Edwards. It continues to serve as one of Eagle County's primary high schools today. The new facility was designed by H+L Architecture of Denver.

== Notable people ==
- Porter Middaugh ran XC for BMHS and in 2023 September 22, he clocked a record-breaking time at Lincoln Park in Colorado, achieving 14:38 in a 5K.
