= Morgan Creek Fire =

2021 wildfire in Colorado

- Part of the 2021 Colorado wildfires
- Date: July 9, 2021 – October 14, 2021
- Location: Steamboat Springs, Colorado
- Coordinates: 40.718°N 106.829°W

Statistics
- Burned area: 7,586 acres (3,070 ha)

Ignition
- Cause: Lightning

Map
- Location in Western Colorado

The Morgan Creek Fire was a wildfire that started north of Steamboat Springs, Colorado on July 9, 2021. The fire burned 7,586 acres (3,070 ha) and was fully contained on October 14, 2021.

== Events ==
=== July ===
The Morgan Creek Fire was first reported on July 9, 2021, at around 1:00 pm MDT.

=== Cause ===
The cause of the fire is believed to be due to lightning.

=== Containment ===
On October 14, 2021, the Morgan Creek Fire reached 100% containment.

== See also ==
- 2021 Colorado wildfires
- List of Colorado wildfires
