= Sheephorn, Colorado =

Unincorporated community in Eagle County, CO, USA

Coordinates: 39°53′32″N 106°28′01″W

Sheephorn is an isolated, unincorporated community in Eagle County, Colorado, located at an elevation of 7,972 feet. Near the border of Eagle County and Grand County, Sheephorn is sparsely populated and is composed of several ranches, the largest being Piney Peak Ranch, previously known as the Sheephorn Ranch. Sheephorn was homesteaded in the mid-19th century by a handful of families that were cattle ranchers. Sheephorn Creek is a creek fed by snow melt that starts in the Sheephorn mountains and flows south, where it merges with the Colorado River just north of Radium, Colorado.
