= Red Cliff, Colorado =

Town in Colorado, United States

- Town
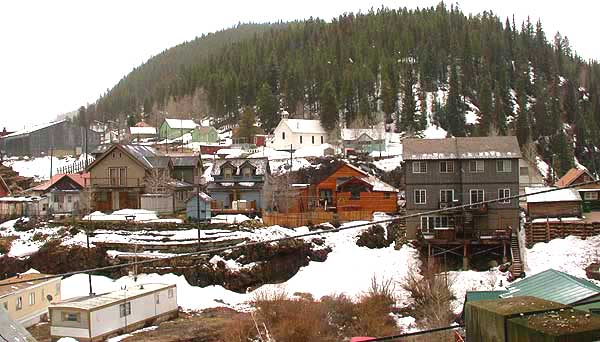
- Red Cliff, seen from across the Eagle River

- Location of Red Cliff in Eagle County, Colorado.
- Coordinates: 39°30′33″N 106°22′12″W
- Country: United States
- State: State of Colorado
- County: Eagle County
- Founded: 1879
- Incorporated (town): December 18, 1880

Government
  - Type: Statutory Town

Area
  - Total: 0.24 sq mi (0.63 km^{2})
  - Land: 0.24 sq mi (0.63 km^{2})
  - Water: 0 sq mi (0.00 km^{2})
- Elevation: 8,832 ft (2,692 m)

Population (2020)
  - Total: 257
  - Density: 1,100/sq mi (410/km^{2})
- Time zone: UTC-7 (Mountain (MST))
  - Summer (DST): UTC-6 (MDT)
- ZIP code: 81649 (PO Box)
- Area code: 970
- FIPS code: 08-63265
- GNIS feature ID: 2412535
- Website: Official website

Red Cliff (sometimes spelled Redcliff) is a statutory town in Eagle County, Colorado, United States. The population was 257 at the 2020 census. The town is a former mining camp situated in the canyon of the upper Eagle River just off U.S. Highway 24 north of Tennessee Pass. The town site is concealed below the highway (which passes over the Red Cliff Truss Bridge) and is accessible by a side road leading to Shrine Pass in the Sawatch Range.

== History ==
It was founded in 1879 during the Colorado Silver Boom by miners from Leadville who came over Tennessee Pass scouting for better prospects. The name derives from the red quartzite cliffs surrounding the town. As the first community in the Eagle Valley, it served temporarily as the first county seat of Eagle County (formed out of Summit County in 1883) until the relocation of the county seat to Eagle in 1921.

The town consisted of a cluster of older homes and converted trailers on the flanks of the canyon around the river, as well as a post office, a historic church and older wooden structures along the main street of the town. Several of the older structures have been converted in recent years into modern businesses, including a restaurant. The town is located within easy driving distance of nearby ski areas, and the revival of the town has given rise to a new inn housed in one of the downtown structures.

In winter, the town serves as a popular access point to Shrine Pass for cross-country skiing, snowshoeing and snowmobiling. In recent years, a car shuttle has operated between the town and nearby Vail, allowing visitors to Vail easy access to the pass.

In 2008, the town of Minturn annexed around 4,000 acres (16 km^{2}) for a proposed Battle Mountain Resort, which also included the abandoned mining town of Gilman. With the expansion, Minturn is now Red Cliff's immediate neighbor to the north.

== Geography ==
According to the United States Census Bureau, the town has a total area of 0.2 square miles (0.6 km^{2}), all of it land.

== Demographics ==
Historical population
Census	Pop.	Note	%±
1890	383		—
1900	256		−33.2%
1910	383		49.6%
1920	347		−9.4%
1930	544		56.8%
1940	715		31.4%
1950	556		−22.2%
1960	586		5.4%
1970	621		6.0%
1980	409		−34.1%
1990	297		−27.4%
2000	289		−2.7%
2010	267		−7.6%
2020	257		−3.7%
U.S. Decennial Census

== 2000 census ==
As of the census of 2000, there were 289 people, 109 households, and 68 families residing in the town. The population density was 1,256.4 inhabitants per square mile (485.1/km^{2}). There were 122 housing units at an average density of 530.4 units per square mile (204.8 units/km^{2}). The racial makeup of the town was 62.98% White, 0.69% African American, 0.69% Native American, 0.35% Pacific Islander, 32.87% from other races, and 2.42% from two or more races. Hispanic or Latino of any race were 61.94% of the population.

There were 109 households, out of which 26.6% had children under the age of 18 living with them, 49.5% were married couples living together, 9.2% had a female householder with no husband present, and 36.7% were non-families. 22.9% of all households were made up of individuals, and 4.6% had someone living alone who was 65 years of age or older. The average household size was 2.65 and the average family size was 3.16.

In the town, the population was spread out, with 20.8% under the age of 18, 13.8% from 18 to 24, 36.7% from 25 to 44, 18.7% from 45 to 64, and 10.0% who were 65 years of age or older. The median age was 33 years. For every 100 females, there were 124.0 males. For every 100 females age 18 and over, there were 126.7 males.

The median income for a household in the town was $50,104, and the median income for a family was $44,219. Males had a median income of $35,694 versus $30,750 for females. The per capita income for the town was $19,864. About 6.8% of families and 9.8% of the population were below the poverty line, including 8.5% of those under the age of eighteen and 31.6% of those 65 or over.

== Education ==
It is in the Eagle County School District RE 50.

== Gallery ==
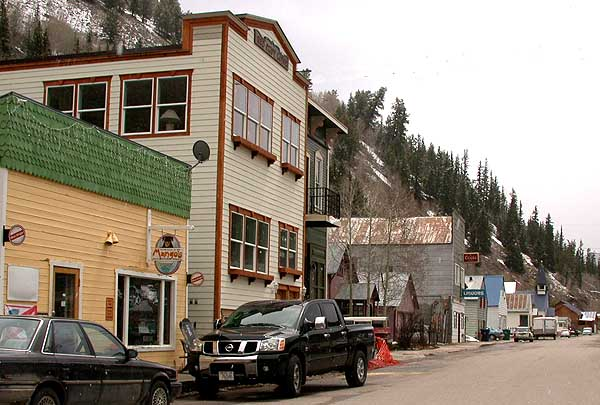
View along the main street in Red Cliff

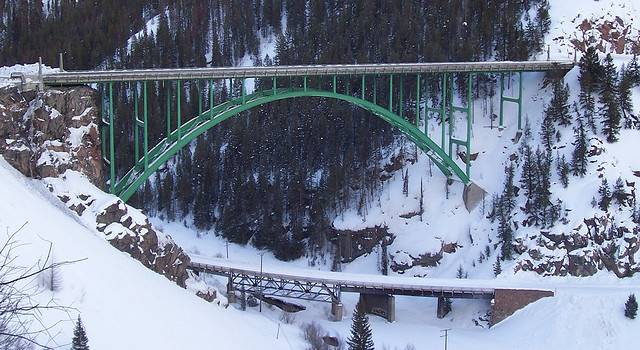
Eagle River Bridge on U.S. Highway 24 near Red Cliff

== See also ==
- Red Cliff Bridge
