= Sylvan Lake State Park =

State park in Eagle County, Colorado

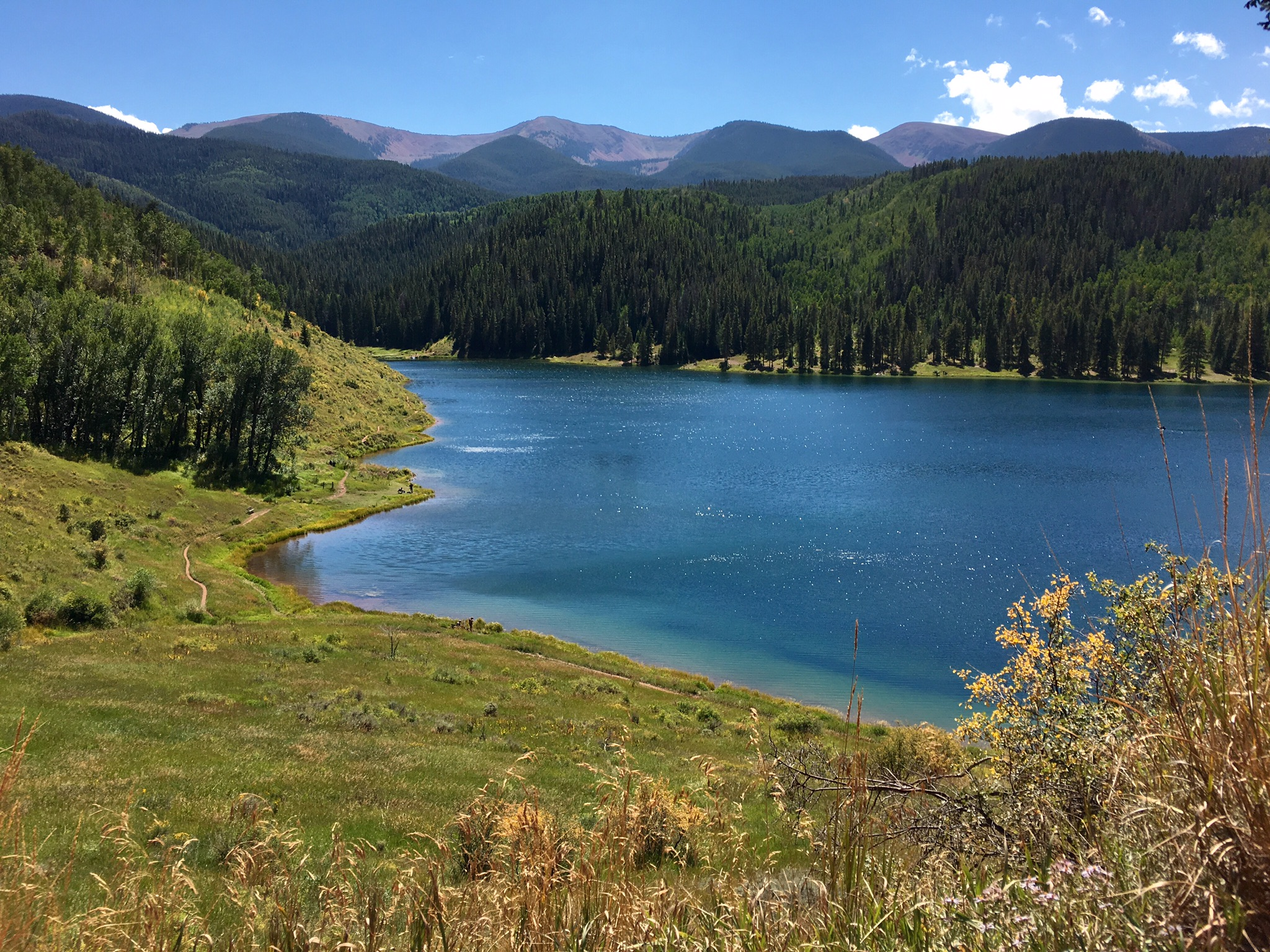
- Sylvan Lake seen from the east

- Location within Colorado
- Location: Eagle County, Colorado, United States
- Nearest city: Eagle, Colorado
- Coordinates: 39°32′38″N 106°45′18″W
- Area: 1,548 acres (626 ha)
- Established: 1987
- Visitors: 110,787 (in 2021)
- Governing body: Colorado Parks & Wildlife
- Website: Official website

Sylvan Lake State Park is a Colorado state park located in Eagle County, 10 miles (16 km) south of Eagle, Colorado. The 1,548-acre (626 ha) park established in 1987 and surrounded by the White River National Forest includes a 42-acre (17 ha) lake and 1.5 miles (2.4 km) of trails.

Facilities include a visitors center, boat ramp, campsites, cabins, yurts and picnic sites. Plant communities include aspen groves, lodgepole pine and Douglas fir forests on moist slopes. Ponderosa pine and juniper are found on drier slopes. Wetland and riparian areas exist near the reservoir and creek. Common wildlife includes black bear, elk, bald eagle, mule deer, pine marten, and beaver.
