= Edwards, Colorado =

Census-designated place in Colorado, US

- Census-designated place
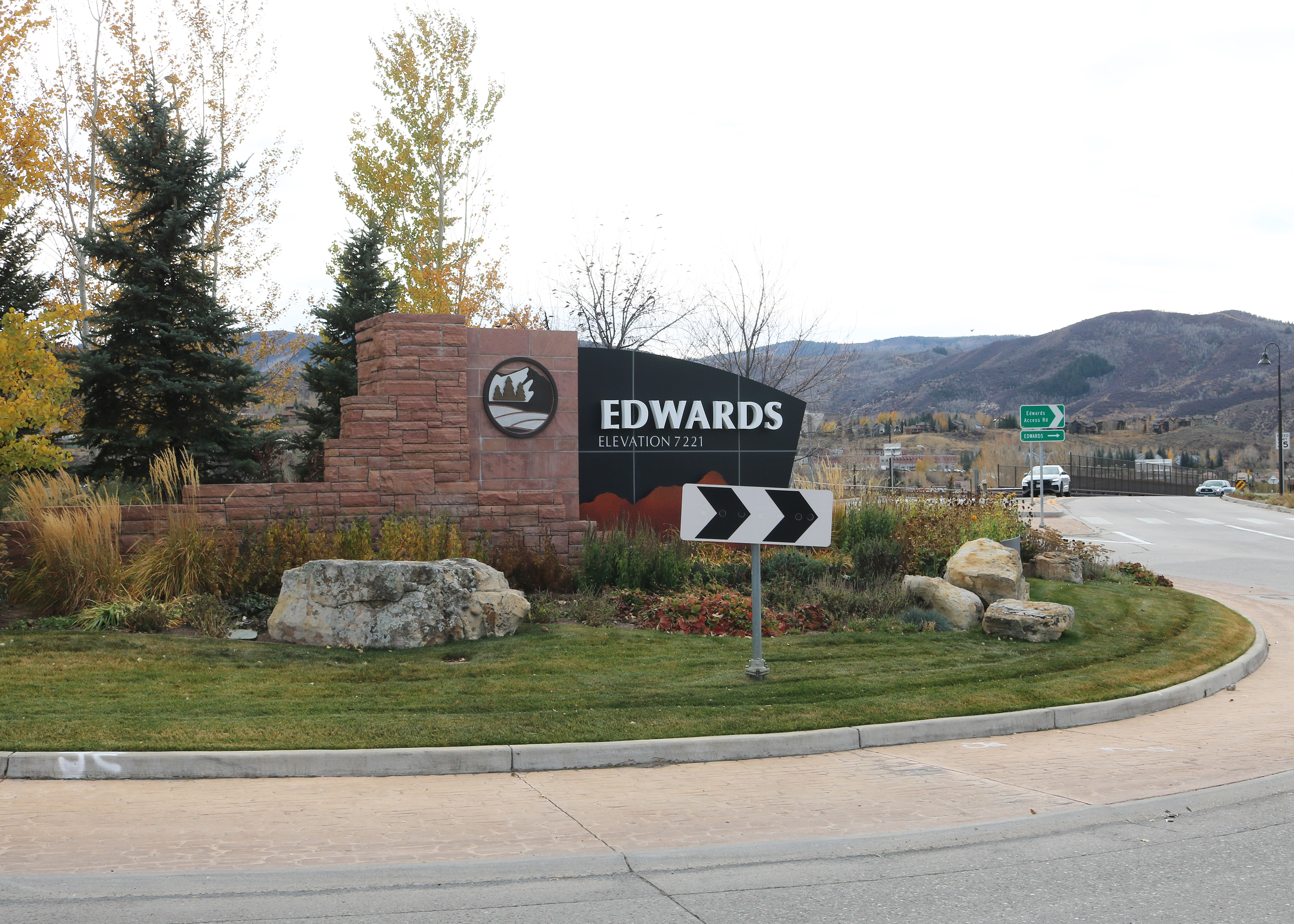
- Roundabout in Edwards near Interstate 70

- Location of the Edwards CDP in Eagle County, Colorado
- Coordinates: 39°37′18″N 106°37′06″W
- Country: United States
- State: Colorado
- County: Eagle

Government
  - Type: unincorporated community
  - Body: Eagle County

Area
  - Total: 26.789 sq mi (69.382 km^{2})
  - Land: 26.636 sq mi (68.988 km^{2})
  - Water: 0.152 sq mi (0.394 km^{2})
- Elevation: 7,221 ft (2,201 m)

Population (2020)
  - Total: 11,246
  - Density: 422.20/sq mi (163.01/km^{2})
- Time zone: UTC−07:00 (MST)
  - Summer (DST): UTC−06:00 (MDT)
- ZIP code: 81632
- Area codes: 970/748
- GNIS town ID: 2408049
- FIPS code: 08-23300

Edwards is an unincorporated town and a census-designated place located in and governed by Eagle County, Colorado, United States. Despite being an unincorporated community, Edwards is the principal community of the Edwards, CO Micropolitan Statistical Area and the Edwards-Rifle, CO Combined Statistical Area. The Edwards post office has the ZIP Code 81632. At the United States Census 2020, the population of the Edwards CDP was 11,246. The Edwards Metropolitan District provides services.

== History ==
The Edwards, Colorado, post office opened on July 10, 1883. The community was named after Melvin Edwards, a local postal official.

== Geography ==
Edwards is in the valley of the Eagle River and extends southwards up the valleys of Lake Creek and Colorow Creek, at the north end of the Sawatch Range. It is bordered to the east by the town of Avon. U.S. Route 6 runs through the center of Edwards on the south side of the Eagle River, while Interstate 70 runs through the CDP north of the river, with access from Exit 163. Via I-70, it is 14 miles (23 km) east to Vail, 110 miles (180 km) east to Denver, 17 miles (27 km) west to Eagle, and 47 miles (76 km) west to Glenwood Springs.

The Edwards CDP has an area of 17,145 acres (69.382 km^{2}), including 97 acres (0.394 km^{2}) of water.

== Education ==
=== K-12 education ===
Edwards is served by Eagle County School District Re-50J. The community is home to an elementary school, a middle school, three high schools, and a charter school:

- Edwards Elementary School
- Berry Creek Middle School
- Eagle County Charter Academy
- Battle Mountain High School
- Red Canyon Alternative High School
- Vail Christian High School

=== Higher education ===
Colorado Mountain College operates its Vail Valley campus in Edwards. In 2022, CMC Vail Valley enrolled 2,490 students, making it the largest CMC campus by enrollment.

== Demographics ==
The United States Census Bureau initially defined the Edwards CDP for the United States Census 2000.

Edwards CDP, Colorado
Year	Pop.	±%
2000	8,257	—
2010	10,266	+24.3%
2020	11,246	+9.5%
Source: United States Census Bureau

=== 2020 census ===
As of the 2020 census, Edwards had a population of 11,246. The median age was 39.2 years. 23.0% of residents were under the age of 18 and 13.4% of residents were 65 years of age or older. For every 100 females there were 106.6 males, and for every 100 females age 18 and over there were 103.7 males age 18 and over.

73.0% of residents lived in urban areas, while 27.0% lived in rural areas.

There were 4,109 households in Edwards, of which 34.7% had children under the age of 18 living in them. Of all households, 54.5% were married-couple households, 17.7% were households with a male householder and no spouse or partner present, and 21.4% were households with a female householder and no spouse or partner present. About 20.5% of all households were made up of individuals and 6.8% had someone living alone who was 65 years of age or older.

There were 5,752 housing units, of which 28.6% were vacant. The homeowner vacancy rate was 1.4% and the rental vacancy rate was 4.0%.

Racial composition as of the 2020 census
Race	Number	Percent
White	7,668	68.2%
Black or African American	68	0.6%
American Indian and Alaska Native	79	0.7%
Asian	151	1.3%
Native Hawaiian and Other Pacific Islander	4	0.0%
Some other race	1,562	13.9%
Two or more races	1,714	15.2%
Hispanic or Latino (of any race)	3,771	33.5%

== Ski resorts ==
Edwards is in a favorable location for skiers and riders. Beaver Creek Resort is 4 miles (6 km) to the east while Vail is 14.5 miles (23.3 km) to the east.

== Notable people ==
- Valerie Constien (born 1996), track and field athlete
- Stacia Hookom (born 1975), snowboarder on the U.S. Snowboarding team
- Colby Lange (born 1999), road and track cyclist
- River Radamus (born 1998), alpine skier

== See also ==
- Edwards, CO Micropolitan Statistical Area
- Edwards-Rifle, CO Combined Statistical Area
