= Eagle County, Colorado =

County in Colorado, United States

- County
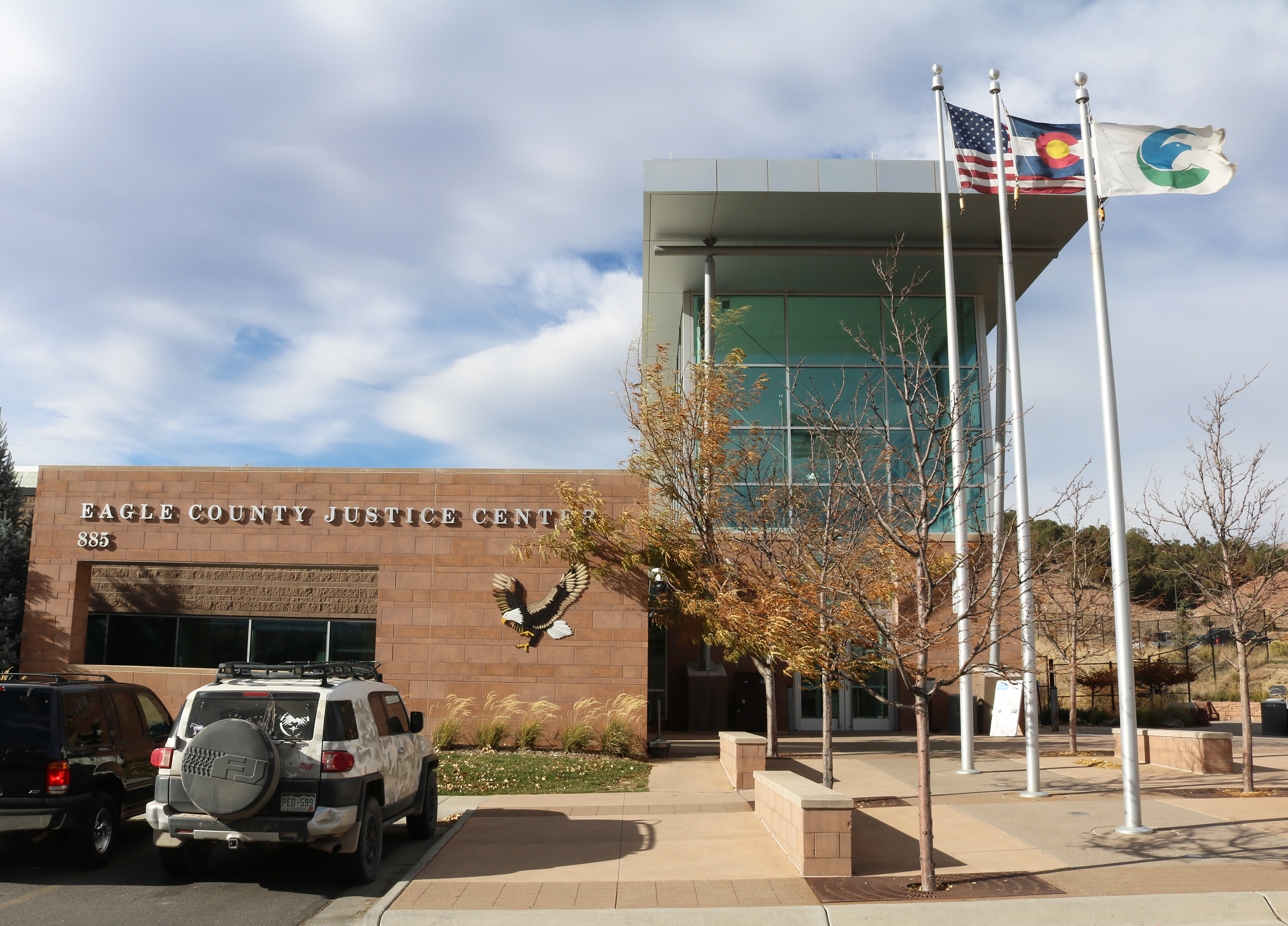
- The Eagle County Justice Center (county courthouse) in Eagle

- Flag Logo

- Location within the U.S. state of Colorado
- Coordinates: 39.62°N 106.70°W
- Country: United States
- State: Colorado
- Founded: February 11, 1883
- Named for: Eagle River
- Seat: Eagle
- Largest community: Edwards

Area
  - Total: 1,692 sq mi (4,380 km^{2})
  - Land: 1,685 sq mi (4,360 km^{2})
  - Water: 7.3 sq mi (19 km^{2}) 0.4%

Population (2020)
  - Total: 55,731
  - Estimate (2025): 54,291 ▼
  - Density: 33/sq mi (13/km^{2})
- Time zone: UTC−7 (Mountain)
  - Summer (DST): UTC−6 (MDT)
- Congressional districts: 2nd, 3rd
- Website: www.eaglecounty.us

Eagle County is a county located in the U.S. state of Colorado. As of the 2020 census, the population was 55,731. The county seat is the Town of Eagle and the most populous community is Edwards. The county is named for the Eagle River.

Eagle County comprises the Edwards, Colorado, Micropolitan Statistical Area.

== History ==
Eagle County was created by the Colorado legislature on February 11, 1883, from portions of Summit County. It was named after the Eagle River, which runs through the county. The county seat was originally set in Red Cliff, Colorado, but was moved to the town of Eagle in 1921.

The Ground Hog Mine, near Red Cliff, produced gold and silver in two vertical veins in 1887. One vein, or "chimney", contained gold in crystalline form, cemented by iron, while the other contained wire gold in the form of "ram's horns". One of these ram's horns is now on display in the Harvard Mineralogical Museum.

== Geography ==
The highest elevation in the county is the Mount of the Holy Cross which rises to 14,011 feet (4,271 m) above sea level. The lowest elevation is on the Colorado River at 6,128 feet (1,868 m).

According to the U.S. Census Bureau, the county has a total area of 1,692 square miles (4,380 km^{2}), of which 1,685 square miles (4,360 km^{2}) is land and 7.3 square miles (19 km^{2}) (0.4%) is water.

Much of the county is taken up by White River National Forest, and much of the rest is managed by the Bureau of Land Management. Interstate 70 crosses the county from east to west.

The Eagle River rises in the southeastern part of the county. It receives Gore Creek at Dowds Junction, and joins the Colorado River in the west. The Fryingpan River and the Roaring Fork River intersect the southwest corner of the county.

=== Adjacent counties ===
- Grand County – northeast
- Summit County – east
- Lake County – south
- Pitkin County – southwest
- Garfield County – west
- Routt County – northwest

=== Major highways ===
- I-70
  - I-70 BS (Eagle)
  - I-70 BS (Edwards)
- US 6
- US 24
- SH 82
- SH 131

=== National protected areas ===
- White River National Forest
- Eagles Nest Wilderness
- Flat Tops Wilderness
- Holy Cross Wilderness

=== State protected area ===
- Sylvan Lake State Park

=== Trails ===
- Colorado Trail
- Continental Divide National Scenic Trail
- Two Elk National Recreation Trail
- Vail Pass National Recreation Trail

=== Scenic byways ===
- Colorado River Headwaters National Scenic Byway
- Top of the Rockies National Scenic Byway

== Demographics ==
Historical population
Census	Pop.	Note	%±
1890	3,725		—
1900	3,008		−19.2%
1910	2,985		−0.8%
1920	3,385		13.4%
1930	3,924		15.9%
1940	5,361		36.6%
1950	4,488		−16.3%
1960	4,677		4.2%
1970	7,498		60.3%
1980	13,320		77.6%
1990	21,928		64.6%
2000	41,659		90.0%
2010	52,197		25.3%
2020	55,731		6.8%
2025 (est.)	54,291	▼	−2.6%
U.S. Decennial Census; 1790–1960 1900–1990; 1990–2000 2010–2020

=== 2020 census ===
As of the 2020 census, the county had a population of 55,731. Of the residents, 22.4% were under the age of 18 and 11.6% were 65 years of age or older; the median age was 37.6 years. For every 100 females there were 109.8 males, and for every 100 females age 18 and over there were 109.3 males. 81.5% of residents lived in urban areas and 18.5% lived in rural areas.

Eagle County, Colorado – Racial and ethnic composition Note: the US Census treats Hispanic/Latino as an ethnic category. This table excludes Latinos from the racial categories and assigns them to a separate category. Hispanics/Latinos may be of any race.
Race / Ethnicity (NH = Non-Hispanic)	Pop 2000	Pop 2010	Pop 2020	% 2000	% 2010	% 2020
White alone (NH)	30,892	35,105	36,202	74.15%	67.25%	64.96%
Black or African American alone (NH)	104	243	296	0.25%	0.47%	0.53%
Native American or Alaska Native alone (NH)	184	134	118	0.44%	0.26%	0.21%
Asian alone (NH)	337	517	712	0.81%	0.99%	1.28%
Pacific Islander alone (NH)	24	15	27	0.06%	0.03%	0.05%
Other race alone (NH)	38	86	187	0.09%	0.16%	0.34%
Mixed race or Multiracial (NH)	398	408	1,331	0.96%	0.78%	2.39%
Hispanic or Latino (any race)	9,682	15,689	16,858	23.24%	30.06%	30.25%
Total	41,659	52,197	55,731	100.00%	100.00%	100.00%

The racial makeup of the county was 71.0% White, 0.6% Black or African American, 0.9% American Indian and Alaska Native, 1.3% Asian, 0.1% Native Hawaiian and Pacific Islander, 11.9% from some other race, and 14.2% from two or more races. Hispanic or Latino residents of any race comprised 30.2% of the population.

There were 20,760 households in the county, of which 33.7% had children under the age of 18 living with them and 19.2% had a female householder with no spouse or partner present. About 21.5% of all households were made up of individuals and 6.3% had someone living alone who was 65 years of age or older.

There were 32,967 housing units, of which 37.0% were vacant. Among occupied housing units, 64.9% were owner-occupied and 35.1% were renter-occupied. The homeowner vacancy rate was 1.5% and the rental vacancy rate was 10.9%.

=== 2000 census ===
As of the census of 2000, there were 41,659 people, 15,148 households, and 9,013 families living in the county. The population density was 25 people per square mile (9.7 people/km^{2}). There were 22,111 housing units at an average density of 13 units per square mile (5.0 units/km^{2}). The racial makeup of the county was 85.4% White, 0.3% Black or African American, 0.7% Native American, 0.8% Asian, 0.1% Pacific Islander, 10.8% from other races, and 1.9% from two or more races. 23.2% of the population were Hispanic or Latino of any race.

There were 15,148 households, out of which 32.7% had children under the age of 18 living with them, 50.0% were married couples living together, 5.6% had a female householder with no husband present, and 40.5% were non-families. 20.9% of all households were made up of individuals, and 1.9% had someone living alone who was 65 years of age or older. The average household size was 2.73 and the average family size was 3.17.

In the county, the population was spread out, with 23.5% under the age of 18, 11.4% from 18 to 24, 42.1% from 25 to 44, 20.0% from 45 to 64, and 3.0% who were 65 years of age or older. The median age was 31 years. For every 100 females there were 121.00 males. For every 100 females age 18 and over, there were 125.80 males.

The median income for a household in the county was $62,682, and the median income for a family was $68,226. Males had a median income of $37,603 versus $30,579 for females. The per capita income for the county was $32,011. About 3.9% of families and 7.8% of the population were below the poverty line, including 6.8% of those under age 18 and 7.6% of those age 65 or over.

== Education ==
=== Public education ===
Three school districts have portions of Eagle County:

- Eagle County School District RE-50J
- Roaring Fork School District RE-1
- West Grand School District 1-JT

District RE-50J operates eight elementary schools, three middle schools, and three high schools across Eagle County.

=== Private/other education ===
- Vail Christian High School (Edwards)
- Vail Mountain School (Vail)

=== Higher education ===
Colorado Mountain College, a community college serving much of western Colorado, operates its Vail Valley campus in Edwards.

== Life expectancy ==
According to a report in JAMA, residents of Eagle County had a life expectancy from birth of 85.94 years in 2014, the third-longest in the United States. Men live 84.4 years on the average and women live 87.6 years. Two contiguous counties, Summit and Pitkin counties, rank numbers one and two in the nation in life expectancy.

Factors contributing to the high life expectancy of the three Colorado counties are "high education, high income, high access to medical care, the people are physically active, obesity is lower than anywhere else – so you're doing it right." said Ali Mokdad, one of the study's co-authors.

== Politics ==
A swing county for much of the 20th century, Eagle County trended Republican by the 1950s, and up through 1988 it was carried by a Democrat only in the national landslide 1964 election. Democrat Bill Clinton carried the county in both 1992 and 1996, before George W. Bush managed to narrowly flip it back Republican in 2000 (all by pluralities). Since then, the county has swung heavily to the Democratic Party. John Kerry in 2004 won the first full Democratic majority since 1964. Barack Obama performed even better in 2008, and Joe Biden improved the Democratic score yet again in 2020.

United States presidential election results for Eagle County, Colorado
Year	Republican		Democratic		Third party(ies)	
Year	No.	%	No.	%	No.	%
1884	306	61.57%	190	38.23%	1	0.20%
1888	604	59.98%	400	39.72%	3	0.30%
1892	275	29.22%	0	0.00%	666	70.78%
1896	53	4.38%	1,149	95.04%	7	0.58%
1900	412	29.90%	943	68.43%	23	1.67%
1904	802	54.30%	625	42.32%	50	3.39%
1908	521	37.16%	828	59.06%	53	3.78%
1912	387	25.83%	727	48.53%	384	25.63%
1916	397	25.19%	1,136	72.08%	43	2.73%
1920	854	55.13%	649	41.90%	46	2.97%
1924	722	44.43%	431	26.52%	472	29.05%
1928	1,014	63.18%	570	35.51%	21	1.31%
1932	712	33.81%	1,348	64.01%	46	2.18%
1936	776	33.06%	1,541	65.66%	30	1.28%
1940	1,077	42.00%	1,474	57.49%	13	0.51%
1944	922	49.07%	952	50.67%	5	0.27%
1948	738	40.31%	1,008	55.05%	85	4.64%
1952	1,242	53.70%	1,058	45.74%	13	0.56%
1956	1,154	57.36%	852	42.35%	6	0.30%
1960	989	52.86%	880	47.03%	2	0.11%
1964	644	33.11%	1,299	66.79%	2	0.10%
1968	1,049	49.11%	927	43.40%	160	7.49%
1972	1,920	58.16%	1,306	39.56%	75	2.27%
1976	2,963	64.18%	1,502	32.53%	152	3.29%
1980	3,061	52.63%	1,608	27.65%	1,147	19.72%
1984	4,500	67.84%	2,032	30.63%	101	1.52%
1988	4,366	55.91%	3,314	42.44%	129	1.65%
1992	3,100	28.52%	3,870	35.60%	3,900	35.88%
1996	4,637	40.89%	5,094	44.92%	1,610	14.20%
2000	7,165	47.18%	6,772	44.59%	1,251	8.24%
2004	8,533	46.10%	9,744	52.64%	234	1.26%
2008	8,181	37.77%	13,191	60.91%	286	1.32%
2012	9,411	41.52%	12,792	56.43%	465	2.05%
2016	8,990	35.64%	14,099	55.90%	2,134	8.46%
2020	9,892	33.95%	18,588	63.79%	660	2.26%
2024	10,148	36.50%	16,943	60.94%	714	2.57%

United States Senate election results for Eagle County, Colorado2
Year	Republican		Democratic		Third party(ies)	
Year	No.	%	No.	%	No.	%
2020	10,350	36.00%	17,902	62.27%	496	1.73%

United States Senate election results for Eagle County, Colorado3
Year	Republican		Democratic		Third party(ies)	
Year	No.	%	No.	%	No.	%
2022	7,776	35.04%	13,960	62.90%	457	2.06%

Colorado Gubernatorial election results for Eagle County
Year	Republican		Democratic		Third party(ies)	
Year	No.	%	No.	%	No.	%
2022	6,661	29.97%	15,230	68.54%	331	1.49%

== Communities ==
=== Towns ===
- Avon
- Basalt (part; extends into Pitkin County)
- Eagle
- Gypsum
- Minturn
- Red Cliff
- Vail

=== Census-designated places ===
- Dotsero
- Edwards
- El Jebel
- Fulford
- McCoy
- Wolcott

=== Other unincorporated places ===
- Beaver Creek
- Bond
- Burns
- Cordillera
- Eagle-Vail
- Sheephorn
- State Bridge
- Sweetwater

=== Ghost towns ===
- Belden
- Gilman
- Holy Cross City
- Mitchell
- Pando

== See also ==
- Bibliography of Colorado
- Geography of Colorado
- History of Colorado
- Flight of Craig D. Button
  - National Register of Historic Places listings in Eagle County, Colorado
- Index of Colorado-related articles
- List of Colorado-related lists
  - List of counties in Colorado
  - List of statistical areas in Colorado
- Outline of Colorado
