= Eagle, Colorado =

Town in Colorado, US

- Home rule town
- Town of Eagle
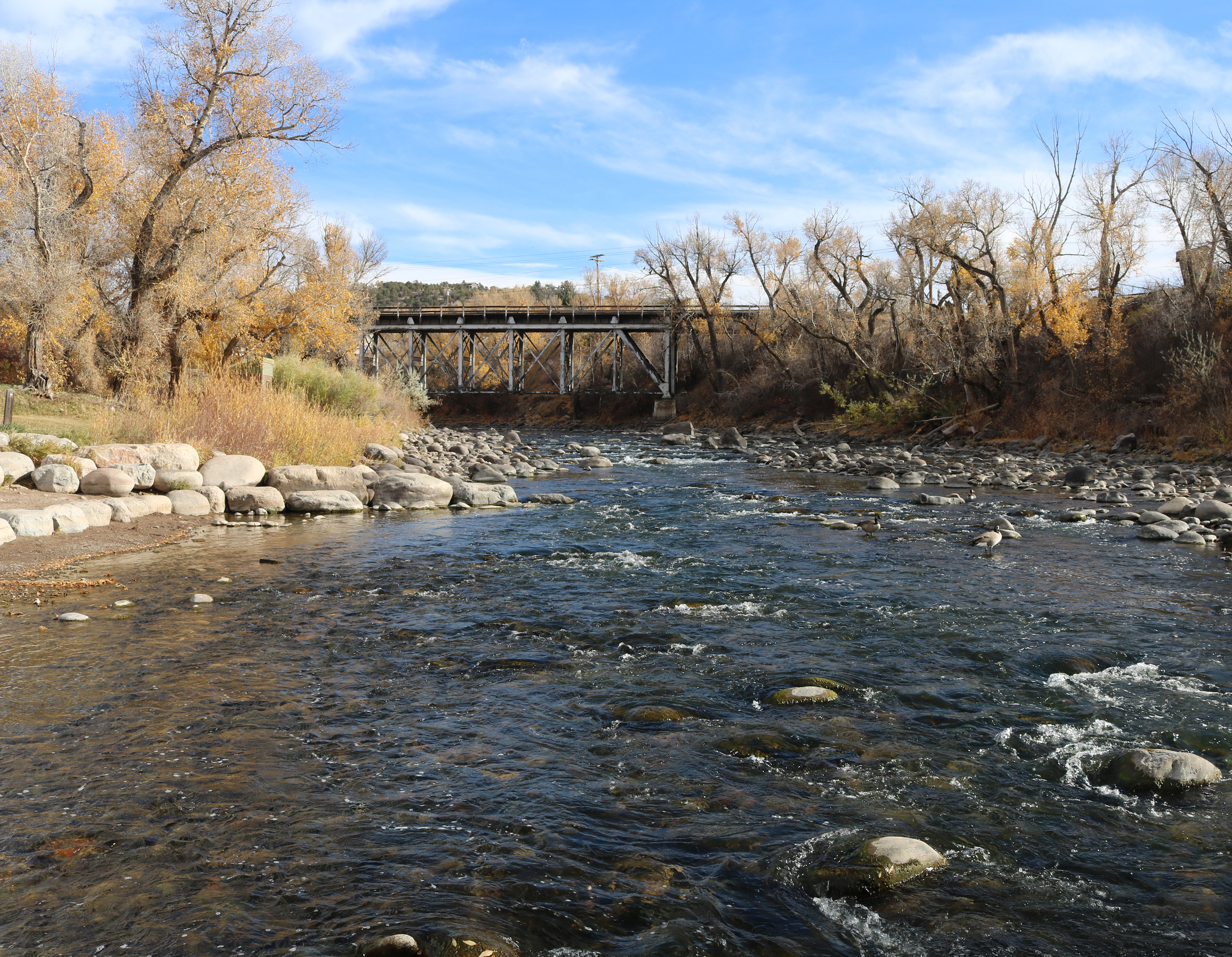
- The Eagle River flows through Chambers Park in Eagle
- Motto: “Classic Colorado”
- Location of the Town of Eagle in Eagle County, Colorado
- Coordinates: 39°37′37″N 106°48′40″W
- Country: United States
- State: Colorado
- County: Eagle
- Incorporated (town): April 5, 1905

Government
  - Type: Home rule town

Area
  - Total: 5.661 sq mi (14.663 km^{2})
  - Land: 5.641 sq mi (14.611 km^{2})
  - Water: 0.020 sq mi (0.052 km^{2})
- Elevation: 6,601 ft (2,012 m)

Population (2020)
  - Total: 7,511
  - Density: 1,331/sq mi (514/km^{2})
- Time zone: UTC−07:00 (MST)
  - Summer (DST): UTC−06:00 (MDT)
- ZIP code: 81631
- Area codes: 970/748
- GNIS town ID: 2412456
- FIPS code: 08-22200
- Website: www.townofeagle.org

Eagle is the home rule town that is the county seat of Eagle County, Colorado, United States. The town population was 7,511 at the 2020 United States census, a +15.41% increase since the 2010 census. Eagle is the part of the Edwards, CO Micropolitan Statistical Area.

== History ==
The Eagle, Colorado, post office opened on September 3, 1891, and the Town of Eagle was incorporated on April 5, 1905. The town takes its name from Eagle County, which itself takes its name from the Eagle River.

== Geography ==
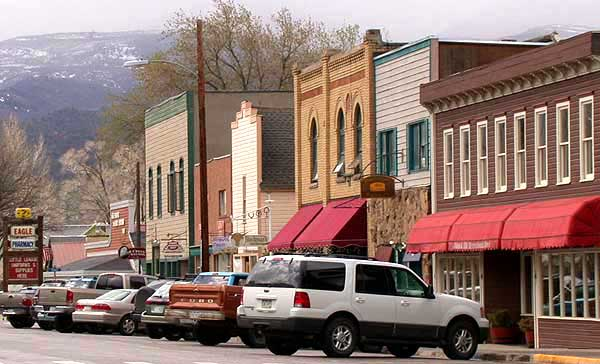
Downtown Eagle Colorado (2005)

Eagle is located west of the center of Eagle County in the valley of the Eagle River, a west-flowing tributary of the Colorado River. The town limits extend southward up the valley of Brush Creek. U.S. Route 6 passes through the center of town, and Interstate 70 passes through the northern side, with access from Exit 147. Vail is 30 miles (48 km) to the east, and Glenwood Springs is 31 miles (50 km) to the west.

At the 2020 United States census, the town had a total area of 3,623 acres (14.663 km^{2}) including 13 acres (0.052 km^{2}) of water.

=== Climate ===
The climate of Eagle is characterized by cold winters, hot summers, and relatively little precipitation. Under the Köppen climate classification, Eagle has a warm-summer humid continental climate (Dfb), but it is borderline semi-arid (BSk) due to low rainfall. As a result of the city's high elevation, temperatures drop sharply after sunset.

Climate data for Eagle County Regional Airport, Colorado (1981–2010 normals, extremes 1904–present)
Month	Jan	Feb	Mar	Apr	May	Jun	Jul	Aug	Sep	Oct	Nov	Dec	Year
Record high °F (°C)	58 (14)	65 (18)	73 (23)	82 (28)	90 (32)	100 (38)	99 (37)	96 (36)	93 (34)	84 (29)	73 (23)	61 (16)	100 (38)
Mean daily maximum °F (°C)	32.4 (0.2)	37.9 (3.3)	47.2 (8.4)	56.6 (13.7)	67.3 (19.6)	77.6 (25.3)	83.1 (28.4)	81.5 (27.5)	72.7 (22.6)	60.3 (15.7)	44.4 (6.9)	32.8 (0.4)	57.8 (14.3)
Mean daily minimum °F (°C)	10.1 (−12.2)	16.8 (−8.4)	25.8 (−3.4)	31.0 (−0.6)	38.3 (3.5)	44.3 (6.8)	51.3 (10.7)	50.5 (10.3)	42.1 (5.6)	31.8 (−0.1)	21.9 (−5.6)	12.5 (−10.8)	31.4 (−0.4)
Record low °F (°C)	−51 (−46)	−46 (−43)	−20 (−29)	−15 (−26)	5 (−15)	12 (−11)	29 (−2)	26 (−3)	14 (−10)	2 (−17)	−29 (−34)	−33 (−36)	−51 (−46)
Average precipitation inches (mm)	0.45 (11)	0.54 (14)	0.78 (20)	1.17 (30)	0.97 (25)	0.74 (19)	1.49 (38)	0.82 (21)	1.43 (36)	1.24 (31)	0.90 (23)	0.78 (20)	11.31 (287)
Average snowfall inches (cm)	6.5 (17)	7.3 (19)	5.4 (14)	3.6 (9.1)	1.1 (2.8)	0 (0)	0 (0)	0 (0)	0.3 (0.76)	2.8 (7.1)	8.0 (20)	11.7 (30)	46.7 (119)
Average precipitation days (≥ 0.01 in)	5.6	6.9	8.2	7.5	8.9	5.9	10.8	8.9	8.3	7.2	8.1	7.6	93.9
Average snowy days (≥ 0.1 in)	5.4	6.3	5.9	3.2	0.6	0	0	0	0.1	1.4	5.7	7.4	36.0
Source: NOAA, Western Regional Climate Center

== Demographics ==
Historical population
Census	Pop.	Note	%±
1900	124		—
1910	186		50.0%
1920	358		92.5%
1930	341		−4.7%
1940	518		51.9%
1950	445		−14.1%
1960	546		22.7%
1970	790		44.7%
1980	950		20.3%
1990	1,580		66.3%
2000	3,032		91.9%
2010	6,508		114.6%
2020	7,511		15.4%
U.S. Decennial Census

=== 2020 census ===
As of the 2020 census, Eagle had a population of 7,511. The median age was 37.4 years. 28.1% of residents were under the age of 18 and 9.7% of residents were 65 years of age or older. For every 100 females there were 102.8 males, and for every 100 females age 18 and over there were 99.2 males age 18 and over.

93.0% of residents lived in urban areas, while 7.0% lived in rural areas.

There were 2,560 households in Eagle, of which 45.9% had children under the age of 18 living in them. Of all households, 61.1% were married-couple households, 14.2% were households with a male householder and no spouse or partner present, and 17.9% were households with a female householder and no spouse or partner present. About 17.4% of all households were made up of individuals and 5.8% had someone living alone who was 65 years of age or older.

There were 2,696 housing units, of which 5.0% were vacant. The homeowner vacancy rate was 0.4% and the rental vacancy rate was 3.5%.

Racial composition as of the 2020 census
Race	Number	Percent
White	6,321	84.2%
Black or African American	35	0.5%
American Indian and Alaska Native	43	0.6%
Asian	47	0.6%
Native Hawaiian and Other Pacific Islander	0	0.0%
Some other race	398	5.3%
Two or more races	667	8.9%
Hispanic or Latino (of any race)	1,437	19.1%

=== 2010 census ===
As of the 2010 census, there were 6,508 people, 2,183 households, and 1,666 families residing in the town. The population density was 1,417.9 inhabitants per square mile (547.5/km^{2}). There were 2,416 housing units at an average density of 526.4 units per square mile (203.2 units/km^{2}). The racial makeup of the town was 87.3% White, 0.4% African American, 0.8% Native American, 0.8% Asian, 0.02% Pacific Islander, 7.9% some other race, and 2.6% from two or more races. Hispanic or Latino of any race were 22.3% of the population.

There were 2,183 households, out of which 49.5% had children under the age of 18 living with them, 65.5% were headed by married couples living together, 6.7% had a female householder with no husband present, and 23.7% were non-families. 16.3% of all households were made up of individuals, and 4.1% were someone living alone who was 65 years of age or older. The average household size was 2.96 and the average family size was 3.33.

In the town, the population was spread out, with 31.7% under the age of 18, 5.8% from 18 to 24, 35.8% from 25 to 44, 22.7% from 45 to 64, and 4.1% who were 65 years of age or older. The median age was 33.8 years. For every 100 females, there were 104.5 males. For every 100 females age 18 and over, there were 102.9 males.

=== Income and poverty ===
For the period 2010–14, the estimated median annual income for a household in the town was $81,571, and the median income for a family was $94,875. Male full-time workers had a median income of $65,156 versus $47,902 for females. The per capita income for the town was $35,426. About 2.0% of families and 4.2% of the population were below the poverty line, including 2.8% of those under age 18 and 28.2% of those age 65 or over.

== Community activism ==
The Eagle community has an involved community, especially when big issues come up for review. In just three years, there were three referendums. In January 2010, voters defeated a 582,000-square-foot (54,100 m^{2}) lifestyle center project called Eagle River Station. In January 2012, voters approved allowing the medical marijuana dispensary to stay in business. (The board of trustees originally allowed the business to open but then the new board of trustees decided to withdraw that permit. The owners of the marijuana dispensary then took it to the vote of the people and the business was allowed to stay open.) In May 2012, voters approved the second vote on the now 732,000-square-foot (68,000 m^{2}) lifestyle center project still called Eagle River Station.

== Transportation ==
Eagle County Regional Airport (IATA:EGE, ICAO:KEGE) is 5 miles (8 km) to the west, located between Eagle and the town of Gypsum. Many airlines provide services from Eagle to various destinations during the ski season months, although in the low season months the airport just has services to Dallas and Denver. ECO Transit provides local transportation from Eagle to Dotsero, Gypsum, Edwards, Avon and Vail.

- Interstate 70 runs east–west connecting the town to Baltimore, Maryland, on its east end, passing through Columbus, Indianapolis, Saint Louis, Kansas City, and Denver, and ends at Interstate 15 in Utah.
- U.S. Highway 6 parallels Interstate 70 in Eagle County, running east–west from Provincetown, Massachusetts, to Bishop, California.

Union Pacific Railroad's tracks cross Eagle, linking the town to Denver, Grand Junction, and Pueblo. The closest Amtrak station is located in Glenwood Springs, 31 miles (50 km) to the west, with daily service of the California Zephyr.

Bustang, Colorado's state-run bus service, connects Eagle to both Grand Junction and Denver.

== Education ==
It is in the Eagle County School District RE 50.

Eagle is home to two elementary schools and a middle school:

- Brush Creek Elementary School
- Eagle Valley Elementary School
- Eagle Valley Middle School

Eagle Valley High School, located in the neighboring town of Gypsum, serves the students of Eagle.

== Recreation ==
The town has an extensive trail system for mountain biking, hiking and trail running.

== Notable residents ==
- Benjamin Kunkel (born 1972), novelist and political economist

== See also ==
- Edwards, CO Micropolitan Statistical Area
- Edwards-Rifle, CO Combined Statistical Area
