= Homestake =

Homestake may refer to:

- Homestake Creek, in Eagle County, Colorado
- Homestake experiment, an experiment headed by astrophysicists Raymond Davis, Jr. and John N. Bahcall in the late 1960s
- Homestake Pass, a mountain pass in the Rocky Mountains of Montana in the United States
- Homestake Mining Company, one of the largest gold mining businesses in the United States from the 19th century through the beginning of the 21st
  - Homestake Mine (disambiguation), the name for several mines in the United States
- Homestake Reservoir, in Colorado, U.S.
- Homestake, a formation on Mars analyzed by Opportunity rover, which was concluded to be formed of gypsum
