= Colorado's Copper Triangle =

Road cycling route in Colorado

Colorado's Copper Triangle is a cycling route for road cyclists. The route begins at Copper Mountain, Colorado, and follows State Highway 91 south to US Highway 24, just before reaching Leadville, Colorado. Heading north on 24, the route continues on to Interstate 70 and after passing Minturn, Colorado, follows a bicycle path back to Copper Mountain along the interstate. The route may be started at any point on the circuit, though parking might be easier to come by in the Copper Mountain area. This circuit covers approximately 85 mi (137 km) of road and four mountain passes: Fremont Pass, Tennessee Pass, Battle Mountain Pass and Vail Pass. The route and elevation profile can no longer be seen here. The total elevation climb during the circuit is approximately 6,000 ft (1,800 m). Three mountain ranges are passed through, Tenmile, Gore and Sawatch, and the route travels past the historic Camp Hale, used by the United States Army, 10th Mountain Division, to train soldiers during World War II.

The Copper Triangle is a popular route for bicycling enthusiasts, and hosts the annual Colorado Cyclist Copper Triangle cycling event. This event is a benefit ride that supports the Davis Phinney Foundation. This foundation was created by namesake, Davis Phinney, a former professional road bicycle racer after having been diagnosed with Parkinson's disease at the age of 40. The Davis Phinney Foundation supports medical research to improve the lives of those with Parkinson's. The Colorado Cyclist Copper Triangle event is sponsored by Saab, Crocs, Copper Mountain Ski Resort, The Village at Copper and numerous others, while the title sponsor is Colorado Cyclist. Colorado Cyclist is one of the largest bicycle and bicycle accessory retailers in the United States and is located in Colorado Springs, Colorado.
