= Gore Creek (Colorado) =

River in Eagle County, Colorado, United States

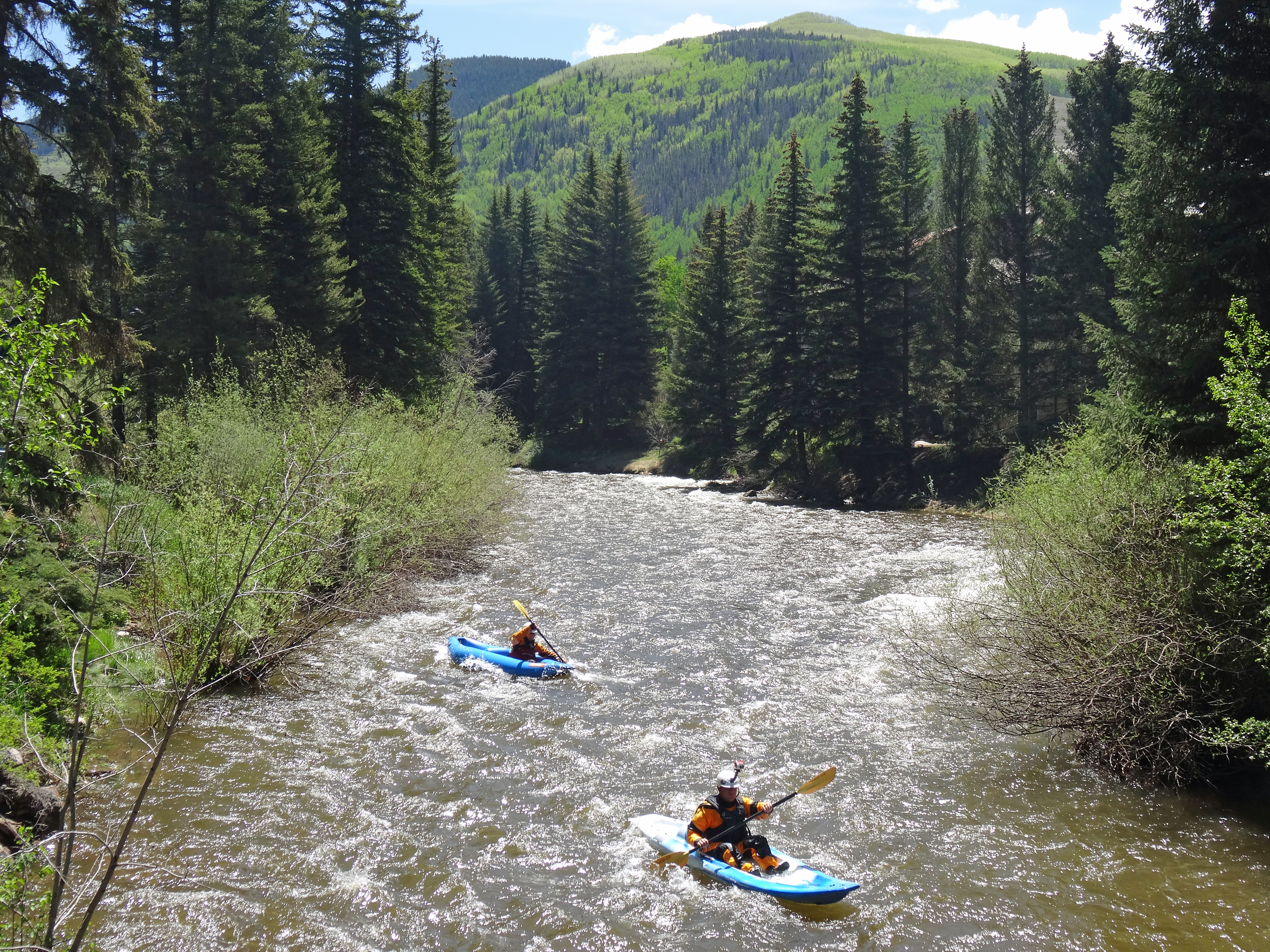
- Gore Creek in June, 2014

Physical characteristics
- Source
  - coordinates: 39°36′29″N 106°11′43″W
- Mouth
  - location: Confluence with Eagle
  - coordinates: 39°36′32″N 106°26′57″W
  - elevation: 7,713 ft (2,351 m)

Basin features
- Progression: Eagle—Colorado

Gore Creek is a tributary of the Eagle River, approximately 18.5 miles (29.8 km) long, in Eagle County, Colorado, United States,

== Description ==
The river drains an area of the Rocky Mountains at the south end of the Gore Range through Gore Valley. It rises on the Eagle County-Summit County border along the high crest of the Gore Range, in the White River National Forest, approximately 4 miles (6 km) north of Vail Pass, descending to the west through a narrow gorge, receiving Black Gore Creek from the south. Downstream of this confluence, it runs alongside the route of U.S. Highway 6 (built in 1940) and Interstate 70. It flows through Vail and joins the Eagle River from the east, approximately 3 miles (5 km) west of Vail.

While the downstream portions of Gore Creek remain a Gold Medal Brown Trout fishery, the health of aquatic life in the creek has come into question. Due to low counts of aquatic macroinvertebrates, the Colorado Department of Public Health and Environment placed Gore Creek on a state list of impaired waterways in 2011. This raised the alarm in communities along the creek and a team of organizations including the Eagle River Watershed Council, Eagle River Water and Sanitation District and the Town of Vail have come together to restore Gore Creek.

These organizations are calling on citizens and visitors of the Gore Creek Watershed not to pour pollutants down storm sewers, to replace lawns and pavement with native plants and to follow all manufacturer-recommended guidelines when applying fertilizers or pesticides, especially on windy days or when rain is in the forecast. Efforts like these can go a long way toward keeping harmful pollutants out of the creek and helping revive important aquatic insect populations that trout and other wildlife depend on.

== See also ==
- List of rivers of Colorado
- List of tributaries of the Colorado River
