= Eagle Mine =

The Eagle Mine may refer to:

- Eagle Butte Mine, a coal mine north of Gillette, Wyoming in the United States
- Eagle Mine (Michigan), a nickel and copper mine in Marquette County, Michigan, United States
- Eagle Mine (Colorado), an abandoned mine in the Colorado, United States
- Agnico-Eagle Mines, a Canadian-based gold producer
