= Vail Pass Camp =

The Vail Pass Camp is a multi-component prehistoric site, situated at the summit of Vail Pass (elevation 3,224 meters (10,577 ft)) (Gooding 1981), just below the timberline in Colorado. The camp was occupied for over 7000 years, inhabited by various North American aboriginal groups, and is the first open lithic-scatter site. Thirty-three radiocarbon dates were obtained, ranging from 7320 B.P. to 190 B.P. (Gooding 1981:12) with most (all but six) dating to the last 3,000 years. The Vail Pass Camp was most likely discovered in 1887 by T.D.A Cockerell.

Vail Pass Camp was excavated to lessen the effects of highway construction on a prehistoric and historic camp location in the high mountains. The excavated portion of the site covers an area of 453 square meters (4,880 sq ft). Seventy-two archaeological features and nine hundred eighty-eight tools were discovered which have been comprehensively analyzed. Overall, this site has allowed for questions regarding high elevation, prehistoric sites to be answered.

== Surrounding area and climate ==
The Vail Pass Camp is 200m west of I70 on the Rocky Mountains. The subalpine forest provides a moist environment with an abundance of vegetation and game-animals. The temperature would drop on average to 27F between November and May and go up to 48F between June and October.

== Chronology of occupation ==
Analysis of the prehistoric occupation of Vail Pass Camp is based on a total of 33 carbon samples. These samples provide a consistent range of dates and can be separated into seven distinct groups, plus two dates that do not have a close association with any of the groups. The overlap and hiatuses between the groups strongly suggest the reoccupation of the site at different time periods throughout its existence, presumably by different cultural groups. The probability that the various clusters of dates were randomly produced is close to zero.

There is no obvious reason why a site with a strategic location such as this should have been abandoned for such extended periods of time. Even if wildlife, or game, were completely wiped out from over hunting throughout multiple seasons, the fauna would surely regenerate within a five-year period.

The strategic value of Vail Pass Camp is based on its elevation and relation to more potential sites in the immediate area. There is evidence of another smaller site at the summit of Vail Pass Camp that may help to explain the clustered dates. This smaller site also opens up the possibility of there being multiple buried sites within the area. The Engelmann Spruce tree that provided the carbon dates may also help to explain the clustered sequence. The Engelmann Spruce is important because it provides us with information about the availability of firewood, a necessity at a camp in high elevation. With this in mind, it becomes a possibility that the date clusters may represent the complete use of a particular tree, followed by the complete use of another tree at a later time.

Therefore, the unmistakable clustering of the dates reflects a pattern of culture use, as opposed to natural phenomena. In other words, the site was not abandoned because of weather or climate, but rather because the humans had exceeded their resources in that region and would have to wait long periods for regeneration.

== Cultural materials ==
A wide array of materials was found at the Vail Pass Camp. Below is a list of items found with descriptions and analysis accompanying them.

=== Projectile points ===
Three hundred and four projectile points were found with one hundred sixteen of them being taxonomically diagnostic. There are a number of notching and hafting styles on the points. This in turn provides a timeline for the inhabitants that were there and consistent with the technologies used in the Northwest Plains. This represents expansion and contraction of cultures across a specific area. Points found represent a number of periods. These are: Paleo-Indian, Altithermal, McKean Techno Complex, Duncan, Hanna, Summit Stemmed, Gypsum, Pelican Lake, Upper Republican, Late Prehistoric, and Avonlea. This helps provide a timeline to the occupation of the Vail Pass Camp.

=== Knives ===
The knives found were either made from flakes or from small cores. In addition, some knives were hafted while others were hand held. While the knives have similar characteristics to scrapers, they were distinguished through morphological analysis. Many of the items found have been heavily worn out and are only fragments of larger tools. The knives could be used for a number of tasks such as cutting and chopping. Further, wear on the knives can also provide clues for how they were used. “The characteristic of heavy ware coupled with relatively small dimensions of the tools strongly suggests that increased leverage was applied to the edges through a hafted handle.” (Gooding 1981)

=== Scrapers ===
Scrapers are divided into three groups: Uncompahgre scrapers, side scrapers, and end scrapers. They are flake tools that have experienced unifacial wear. Uncompahgre scrapers are often created on large percussion flakes and tend to only have marginal edge retouching. They are thought to have been used as butchering tools. The side scrapers, picture to the right, were only created on their lateral edges and most wear is found on the dorsal exterior of the tool. It is thought that this tool was imported from a tool kit and was not made on site. The end scrapers were the second-most abundant tool found at the camp. They are made from more narrow flakes that come off of larger cores.

=== Raclettes ===
These are special kinds of scrapers than were common with Paleo-Indians, but from the Vail Camp Pass excavation, were radiocarbon dated into the Archaic period. They were made from specific flakes and were retouched to produce a wide flake with a very thin cross section. The raclette was then attached to a split haft handle to be used as desired.

=== Drills ===
Drills are tools that “serve as rotary perforating implements.” (Irwin and Wormington 1970) Types of drill found are plain shafted drills, flanged, and modified flakes. Plain shafted drills aren’t well documented and were projectile points that were reworked. They were most likely used for simple tasks and probably cannot be used as horizon markers. Flanged drills are the most typical drill in prehistoric sites. They were most likely manufactured from a flake blank and were handheld. The modified flakes were probably used as a hafted tool and had steep edge retouch. The modified flakes were the only one to demonstrate drill wear in that rings are noticeable on the drills with actual use as a drill.

=== Gravers ===
Eleven gravers were found at the site. They are defined as “a unifacially retouched projection on a flake or modified biface.” They are larger than spurs and are used to incise materials such as wood, hide, and bone.

=== Beaks ===
Eleven beaks where recovered from the Vail Camp pass. They are made from flakes with a little unifacial retouch and edge work. Beaks look similar to scrapers in that they have been given an edge surrounding their circumference. They were unifacially utilized tools and were most likely manufactured on purpose. Most likely used to back a projection and served as a scraper.

=== Micro Blade ===
One specimen was recovered at the site. The function of the blade is unknown, presumably a cutting tool of some variety. The recovered blade is 29mm long and 6mm wide. Unfortunately, known Paleo-Indian artifacts do not include micro-tools or types of tools for this function, which makes dating this find much harder.

=== Spurs ===
Spurs are tools used generally in a single direction to make incisions in animal hide. Nine specimens have been recovered at this site. Though many of these specimens are small in size, they are backed (reinforced) behind the flake, so they are extremely sturdy tools. Due to the unmodified flake, this item appears to be a ripping tool used in a single directional motion.

=== Saws or denticulates ===
Six specimens were found at this site. The principal characteristic of the denticulates is the serrated edge, suggesting a function in shredding fibers. However, their effectiveness in certain aspects of butchering is also a possibility. The wear on the edge of the tool represents back and forth directional motion.

=== Notches/Spokeshaves ===
Fourteen specimens were recovered at this site. The notches all appear to be manufactured on unmodified flakes or discarded fragments. They are all of a rather consistent size, measuring on average at 4.8mm in diameter. The various aspects of wear on single flakes indicate multiple purpose utilization.

=== Burins ===
Eight specimens were recovered at this site. Four of the specimens are on retouched flakes, and four of them are on biface fragments. None of the burin edges exhibit extensive wear and none of the flakes exhibit any other manufacturing elements oriented specifically to burin use.

=== Preforms ===
Five specimens were recovered at this site. A preform is an incomplete and unused basic form of a stone tool. These specimens exhibit unpatterned bifacial flaking with deep scars and irregular edges. Average size is 52mm by 12 mm. The presence of preforms at Vail Pass Camp suggests an emphasis on final stage tool production as the main characteristic of the lithic technology.

=== Core choppers ===
Two specimens were found at this site. Both of the specimens are small and most likely chopping tools. They are fairly uniform in size, between 73mm and 81mm by 53mm and 58mm.

=== Ground stone ===
The presence of ground stone at Vail Pass Camp is unusual since high elevation sites do not typically yield a significant number of grinding implements. The ground stone is separated into two groups: manos and metates. There is a total of 41 manos collected at this site, and ninety percent of them are composed of the local Maroon Sandstone. Eleven metates were found at this site and are mainly fragmentary, or in various states of reconstruction. A metate (or mealing stone) is a mortar, a ground stone tool used for processing grain and seeds. The mano was used to grind the grain or seed on the metate.

== Material Culture Summary ==
The variety of artifacts recovered from Vail Pass Camp is biased because all excavated dirt was screened through a ¼” mesh. Some knives exhibit extremely fine retouched edges on some margins, with step fractures on other margins. This inconsistency reveals to us the obvious multi-functional aspect of tools and a strict functional approach is not very useful because there is no way to distinguish between primary and secondary functions of the recovered items. However, we can tell that the significant proportion of projectile points and projectile point fragments indicates intense hunting activities and gives us insight as to the type of culture present at the site, hunting oriented.

== Regional considerations ==
None of the sites found had progressed past the Lithic and Archaic Stages. The Vail Pass Camp was vital in systematic land use patterns used by migrators. The geological content of the camp is very fragile because of the changing weather that is normal of the Rockies. This includes rain, wind, and run off because of its high elevation. This can make datable charcoal very difficult to find and use in an accurate manner.

== Conclusion ==
Gooding’s conclusion about the Vail Pass Camp is that the site was used primarily by small hunting and gathering parties sporadically throughout time. Most likely these parties came from the north and east during certain periods, and from the south and west during other periods. Gooding (1981:99) suggests that based on the tools found at the site that inhabitants had “cultural affiliations with the Northwest Plains, the Central Plains, the Great Basin, and perhaps with the Southwest.” Gooding (1981:96–97) believes regional archaeologists have not developed theories for the following reasons: most sites in the area are shallow and open, with poor preservation (especially of datable charcoal); most archaeological work in the region is theoretical; most of the archaeological record is derived from an unchanging cultural adaptation; and the prehistoric inhabitants were not local but derived from the Plains, Great Basin, and Colorado Plateau.
