= Vail Pass =

Mountain pass in Colorado, USA

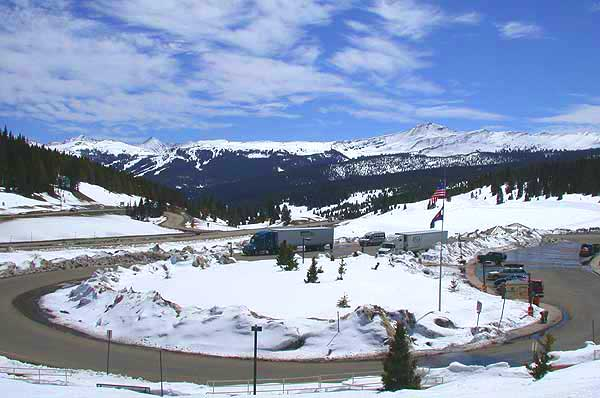
- Rest area on the east side of the pass; the ski runs at Copper Mountain are in the background. (c.2005)

- Location within the United States Location within Colorado
- Elevation: 10,662 ft (3,250 m)
- Traversed by: I-70

Location
- Location: Eagle and Summit counties, Colorado, United States
- Range: Gore Range; Rocky Mountains
- Coordinates: 39°31′50″N 106°13′02″W
- Topo map: USGS Vail Pass

Vail Pass is a 10,662-foot-high (3,250 m) mountain pass in the western United States, located in the Rocky Mountains of central Colorado. The pass was named for Charles Vail, a highway engineer and director of the state highway department from 1930 to 1945.

Vail Pass lies on the boundary between Eagle and Summit counties, between Vail on the west and Copper Mountain on the east. It provides the route of Interstate 70 (and earlier U.S. Highway 6) between the upper basins of the Eagle River and the Blue River, both tributaries of the Colorado River. Black Gore Creek, a tributary of Gore Creek, in the watershed of the Eagle, descends from the north side of the pass towards the town of Vail. West Tenmile Creek, in the watershed of the Blue, descends from the south side. The pass is significantly steep on either side (7% max.), and two runaway truck ramps are available on the west bound side for trucks.

The pass has been featured on dangerousroads.org as one of the most difficult sections of road to navigate in Colorado: "Vail Pass, a difficult road in Colorado", due to its extreme grade, high elevation and frequent weather related hazardous driving conditions.

The pass was not a traditional historical route of the Rockies. Prior to 1940, the most common route westward was over nearby Shrine Pass, just to the south, which leads to the town of Red Cliff in the upper Eagle Valley. In 1940, the construction of U.S. 6 bypassed Shrine Pass in favor of the current route to the valley of Gore Creek.

== Other amenities ==
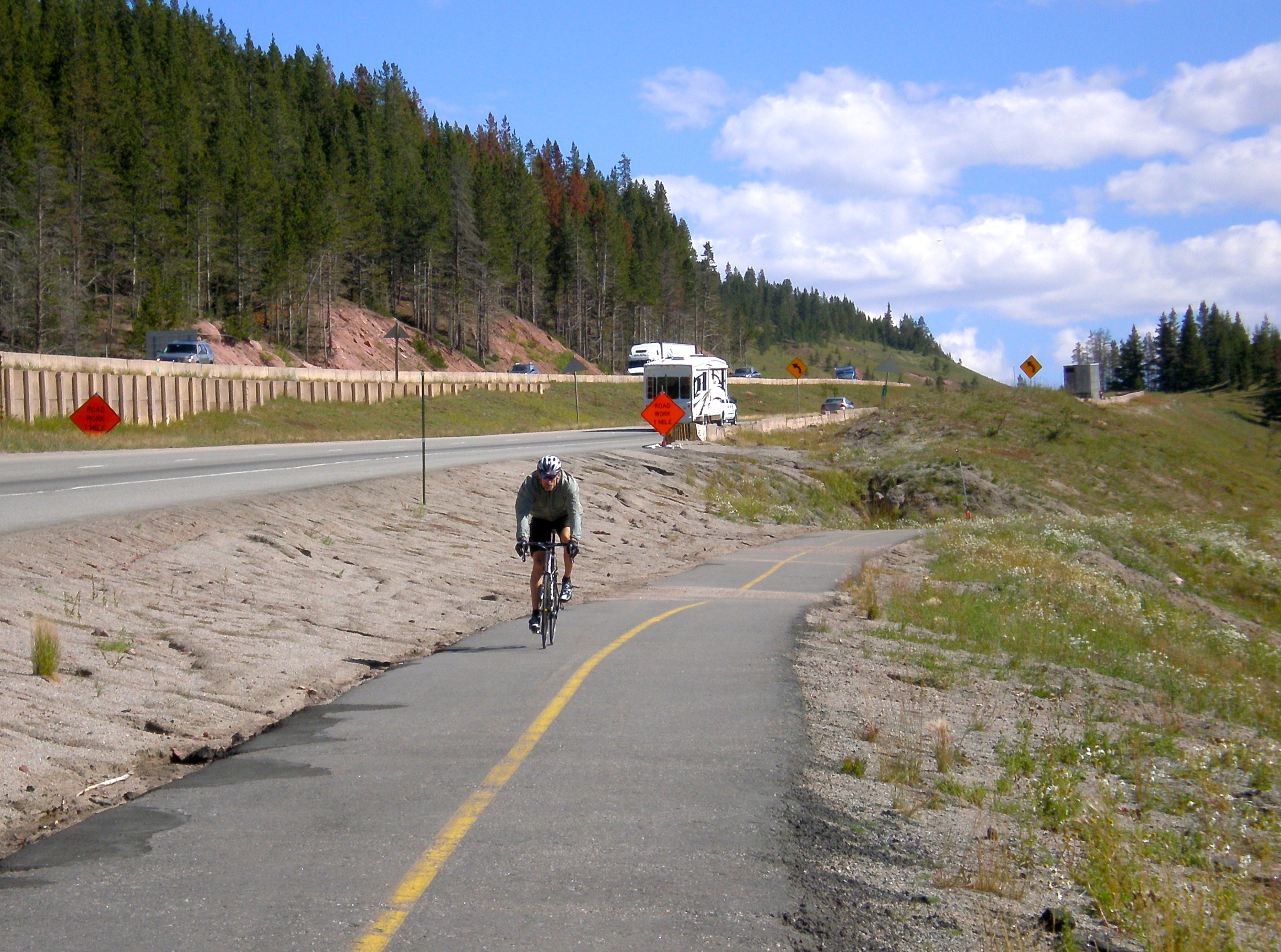
Paved bike route from Vail to Copper Mountain in 2008

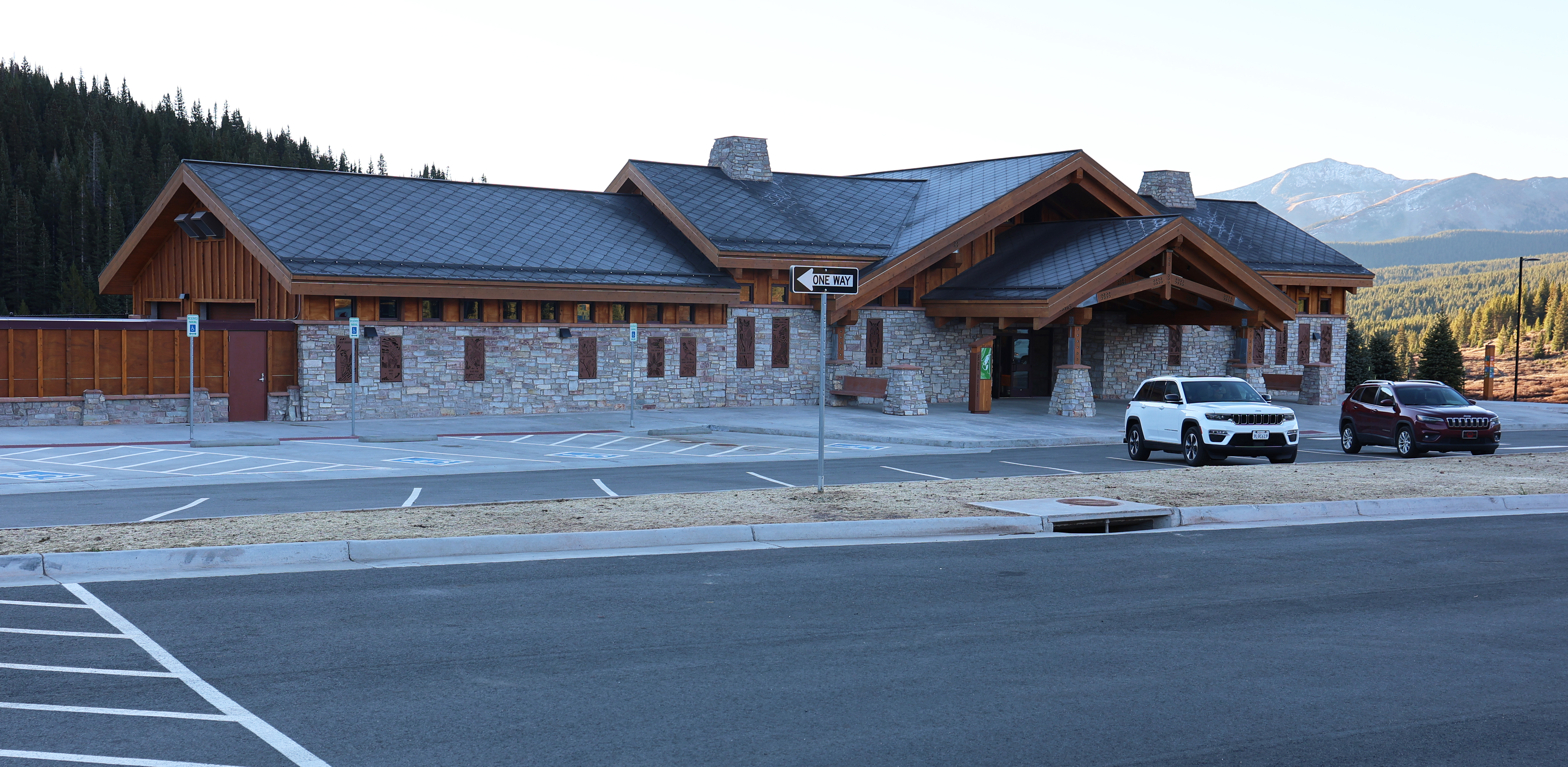
Rest area building (2025)

=== Bicycle path ===
A bicycle path parallels I-70 from Vail to Copper Mountain and is the only pass in Colorado with a paved bike path on both sides for the entire distance. This 8.7-mile (14.0 km) climb from East Vail with an 1,831-foot (558 m) vertical gain and descent to Copper (9,700 ft (2,955 m)) is a popular activity for cyclists during the summer and fall. This route leads to several other bike paths in Summit County; during the winter months, the area hosts backcountry skiing and snowmobile activities.

=== Rest area ===
In 2025, the state's transportation department completely rebuilt the rest area at the pass, adding many new parking spots and a new building housing several restrooms. The site sees a half-million visitors each year.

== See also ==
- Colorado mountain passes
