= Yoga for movement disorders =

Yoga for movement disorders includes focused breathing, flow of poses, and meditative practice of yoga, specifically designed to benefit individuals whose voluntary movement is challenged. Though the symptoms defining movement disorders stem from neurological bases, the term has expanded to include a variety of conditions.

== Background ==
Neurological disorders such as, but not limited to, Parkinson's disease, dystonia, Huntington's disease, multiple system atrophy, and brain trauma and stroke are marked by numerous symptoms. Among the physical symptoms are rigidity, involuntary muscle contractions, bradykinesia (slowness of movement), dyskinesia (excessive and/or repetitive involuntary movement), and impaired balance.

Non-motor symptoms can also impact movement. For example, the sense of proprioception can be affected, limiting the ability to orient where one's limbs are in relation to the space around the body.

Other medical ailments can also restrict movement and affect muscle strength, flexibility and balance. Though not neurologically based, conditions such as aging, arthritis, fibromyalgia, lupus, and multiple sclerosis can benefit from yoga for movement disorders.

== Benefits ==
Muscle spasms, atrophy, and rigidity associated with movement disorders often restrict balance and range of motion. Research shows that the benefits of yoga for movement disorders include improved strength, flexibility, balance, overall fitness and quality of life.

A study by the Parkinson's Disease and Movement Disorder Society of India concluded that significant improvement resulted in each aspect measured in Parkinson's patients who participated in the yoga program of a set series of modified poses. At the University of Kansas, a study measured the benefits of a specifically designed yoga class on the gait, balance, and overall well-being of Parkinson's patients. In a study conducted at the Indiana University, yoga poses particular to the needs of stroke patients showed improved recovery.

== Yoga for movement disorders ==
Limits to balance and range of motion restrict the ability of individuals with movement disorders from practicing traditional yoga poses in a way that is beneficial to them. Injury can result from overstretching. Anxiety, a common symptom of a number of movement disorders, can heighten from the physical challenges of trying to move into a pose. The stress from the fear of falling can overwhelm the meditative value from standard yoga practice.

Yoga for movement disorders is marked by a practice that addresses the needs particular to people living with movement disorders. Adaptations to the flow of poses as well as the individual poses reduce risk of injury and anxiety. The use of supports and modifications enhance balance and range of motion, providing stability and alignment.

Supports for assisting with balance and alignment in yoga for movement disorders include chairs, walls, bolsters, straps, weighted bags, blankets. In addition, techniques using verbal cues and music(subscription required) aid in the success of providing yoga's benefits to those with movement disorders.

== See also ==
- Mayo Clinic
- American Parkinson Disease Association
- Parkinson's Disease Foundation
- Davis Phinney Foundation
- National Stroke Association

== Bibliography ==
- Iyengar B. K. S. YOGA: The Path to Holistic Health, revised edition. London: Dorling Kindersley Limited: 2008.
- Kraftsow G. Yoga for Wellness: Healing with the Timeless Teachings of Viniyoga. NY: Penguin Compass: 1999.
- Le Verrier R. Yoga for Movement Disorders: Regaining Strength, Balance and Flexibility for Parkinson's Disease and Dystonia, London: Merit International Publishing, Inc; 2008.
- Zeiger, P. "Why Yoga Can Be Helpful to Those Living with Parkinson's Disorder." Wellsphere: 2008 December 8: http://www.wellsphere.com/brain-health-article/why-yoga-can-be-helpful-to-those-living-with-parkinson-rsquo-s-disorder/526058
