= Shrine Pass =

Mountain pass in Colorado, USA

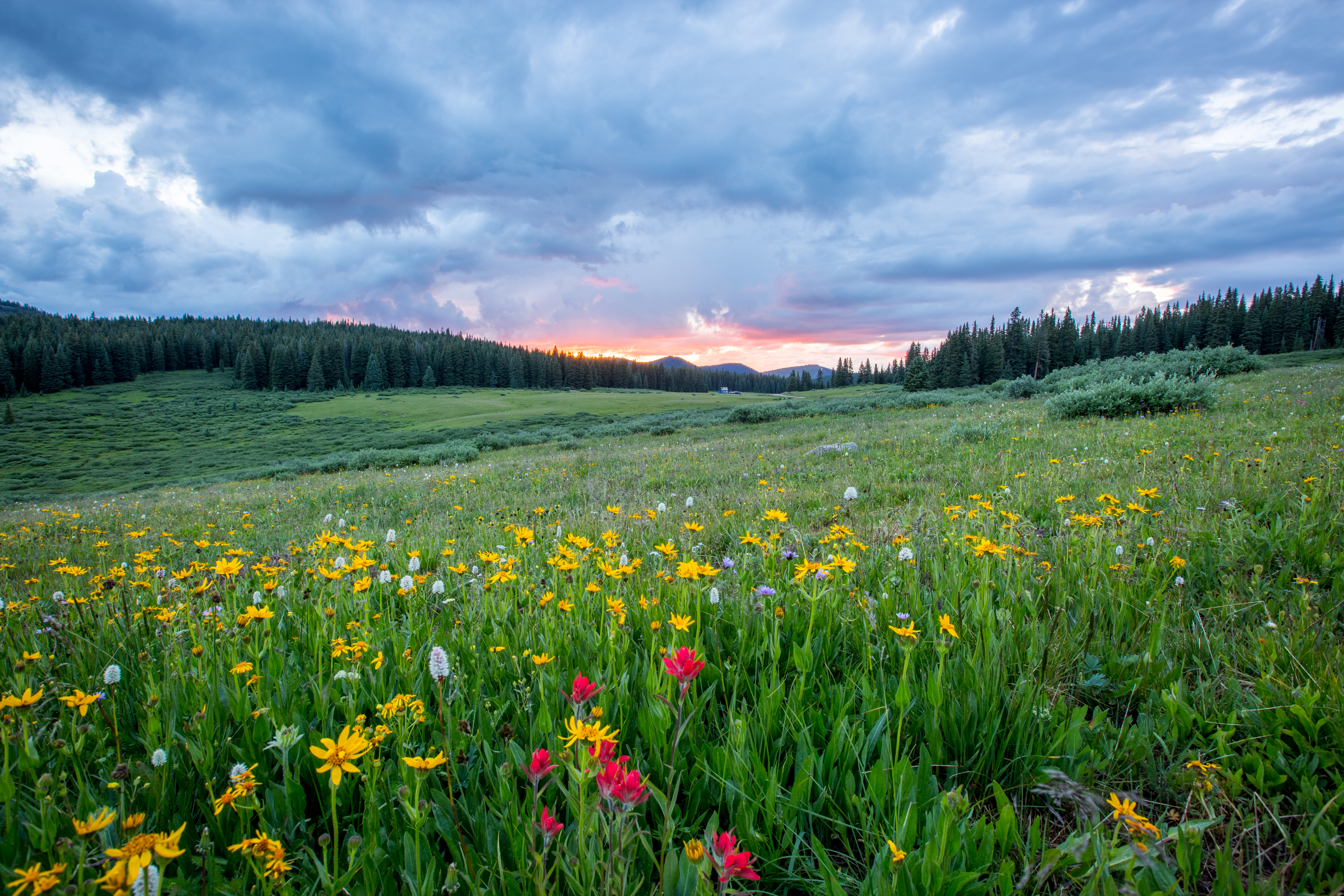
- Shrine Pass Road, Red Cliff, United States

- Location within Colorado
- Elevation: 11,094 feet (3,381 m) NAVD 88
- Traversed by: Unpaved road

Third Approach
- Location: Eagle / Summit counties, Colorado, U.S.
- Range: Sawatch Range
- Coordinates: 39°32′50″N 106°14′32″W
- Topo map: USGS Vail Pass

Shrine Pass, elevation 11,094 ft (3,381 m), is a mountain pass in the Sawatch Range of central Colorado.

The pass is located at the northern end of the Sawatch Range, along the border of Eagle and Summit counties west of Frisco and 2 miles (3.2 km) northwest of Vail Pass. It is traversed by a narrow unpaved road connecting the eastern side of Vail Pass near Interstate 70 (east) with the town of Red Cliff in the upper valley of the Eagle River (west). Most of the time, it is a 4WD or jeep trail; however, in ideal weather the road is considered traversable by sturdy 2WD vehicles and light trucks.

The pass was formerly the principal route between the upper valleys of the Blue and Eagle before the construction of U.S. Highway 6 over nearby Vail Pass, which subsequently became the main route. The pass offers scenic view of wildflower meadows and pine woodlands during the summer and autumn months, as well as distant view of Mount of the Holy Cross to the north. It is especially popular as a sightseeing route during the autumn months.

During the winter, it is a popular snowmobile and cross-country skiing route. A car shuttle from the resort town of Vail in the Eagle Valley to the town of Red Cliff allows skiers to access the pass. After a one-mile hike upwards, it is possible to descend a ten-mile course back down to the town of Red Cliff.

== See also ==
- Colorado mountain passes
