= Copper Mountain (Colorado) =

Mountain and ski resort in Colorado, USA

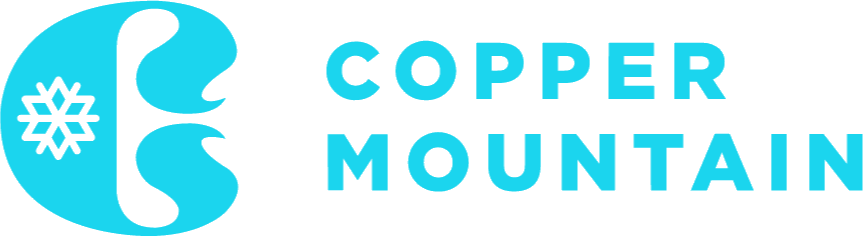

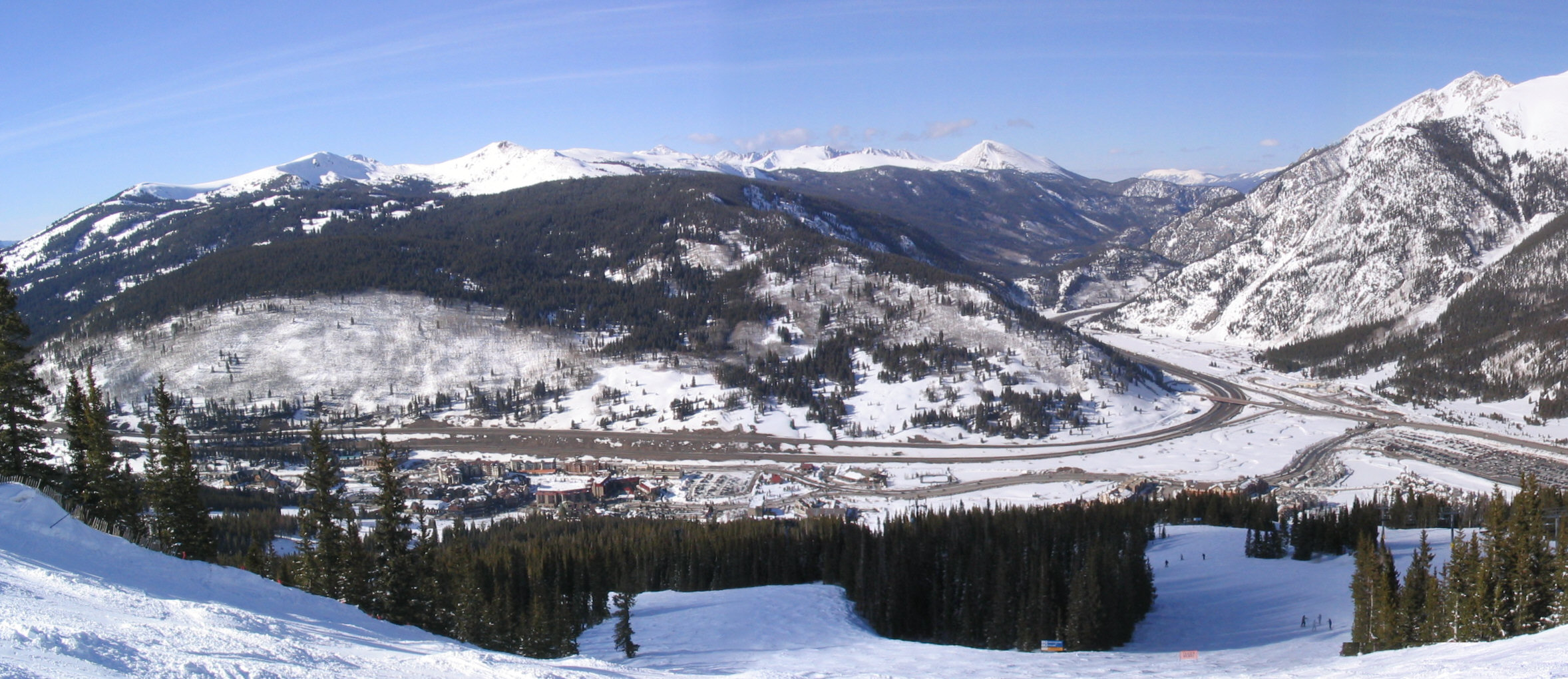
- Base area in March 2006

- Location in Colorado Copper Mountain (the United States)
- Location: White River National Forest; Summit County, Colorado, U.S.
- Nearest city: Frisco: 8 miles (13 km); Denver: 75 miles (120 km)
- Coordinates: 39°30′06″N 106°09′23″W
- Owner: POWDR
- Vertical: 2,601 ft (793 m)
- Top elevation: 12,313 ft (3,753 m)
- Base elevation: 9,712 ft (2,960 m)
- Skiable area: 2,465 acres (10.0 km^{2})
- Trails: 140+ total : 21% easiest : 25% intermediate : 36% advanced : 18% expert
- Longest run: Collage - 1.7 miles (2.73 km)
- Lift system: 23 total: 1 Chondola; 3 high-speed six-person chairs; 3 high-speed quad chairs; 5 triple chairs; 4 double chairs; 8 surface lifts; 1 tubing
- Snowfall: 310 in (790 cm)
- Snowmaking: Yes
- Night skiing: No
- Website: coppercolorado.com

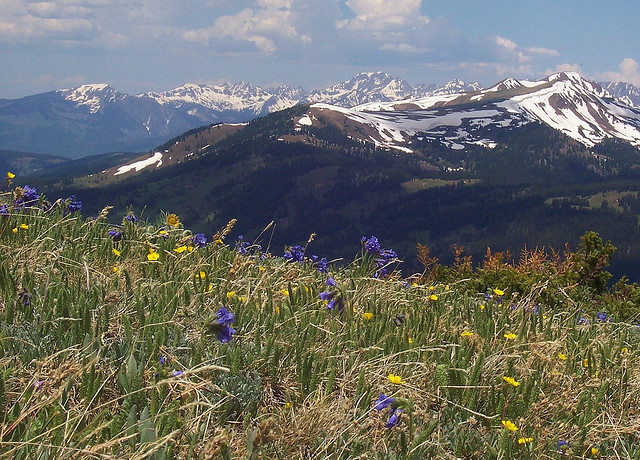
Spaulding Ridge wildflowers, summer 2008.

Copper Mountain is a mountain and ski resort located in Summit County, Colorado, about 75 miles (120 km) west of Denver on Interstate 70. The resort has 2,465 acres (3.9 sq mi; 10.0 km^{2}) of in-bounds terrain under lease from the U.S. Forest Service, White River National Forest, Dillon Ranger District. It is operated by POWDR.

== History ==
The resort opened 54 years ago in November 1972 and has been operated by several owners. In 1980, it was acquired by Apex Oil Company, who operated the area until 1988, when it was acquired by the Toronto-based Horsham Corporation. In 1997, it was acquired by Intrawest, owner and operator of Whistler Blackcomb and operator of Winter Park. Then, in December 2009, Interwest sold Copper Mountain's operations to POWDR.

Copper Mountain hosted the World Cup tour in 1976 with four alpine ski races: slalom and giant slalom for both men and women. The first World Cup events after the Winter Olympics, Copper was a late-season replacement for Heavenly Valley in California, which was low on snow. Double Olympic gold medalist Rosi Mittermaier of West Germany won both women's races and wrapped up the season's overall and slalom titles, and Copper named Rosi's Run after her that same weekend.

The mountain is the starting point of the Colorado's Copper Triangle, a road-cycling circuit that has been the home of the annual Colorado Cyclist Copper Triangle Alpine Cycling Classic since 2005. This event benefits the Davis Phinney Foundation.

Copper Mountain received its first detachable chairlift in 1986 when Poma constructed the American Flyer lift, a high speed quad running from Center Village to the summit of the I-lift. It received a companion lift in 1989 when Poma constructed the American Eagle lift, replacing the F-lift from Center Village to Solitude Station. The F-lift would later reappear at Big Sky Resort as the Southern Comfort lift, and now operates on Lone Peak as the Dakota lift.

The resort's third high speed quad came in 1994, when Doppelmayr USA constructed the Timberline Express to replace the I and J double chairlifts, servicing a pod of blue trails west of the American Flyer lift. The I and J lifts were reinstalled in 1995 and 1996 to provide lift service in the Copper Bowl area, as the Mountain Chief and Blackjack lifts.

In 1998, Poma returned to construct two detachable chairlifts for the east mountain. The Super Bee, a high speed six pack, replaced the B and B1 double chairlifts, providing a one-seat ride from East Village to Resolution Bowl. A short high speed quad known as Excelerator was also built replace the E-lift triple chairlift, running from Solitude Station to the top of Super Bee.

In February 2009, Woodward Camp opened a 20,000-square-foot (1,900 m^{2}; 0.46-acre) indoor ski and snowboard training facility dedicated to terrain park and half-pipe training.

For the 2011–2012 season, Copper Mountain installed their fifth high speed quad when Doppelmayr constructed the Union Creek lift, replacing the High Point double chairlift out of Union Creek base area. The lift was later renamed the Woodward Express in 2019 to reflect the terrain park it services. Also beginning with the 2011–2012 season, the resort became an official U.S. Ski Team downhill training venue.

For the 2017–2018 season, Doppelmayr constructed another high speed quad in the Union Creek base area. The Kokomo Express was built to replace the aging Kokomo triple chairlift and provide improved access to beginner terrain. In that same year, a mountain coaster was built in the Center Village adjacent to the lower section of the American Flyer.

During the summer of 2018, the Center Village high speed quads, now approaching 32 years of service, were replaced with new high speed six packs built by Leitner-Poma. The American Flyer was replaced with a bubble high speed six-pack, which at 9,886 feet (1.8723 mi; 3.013 km) in length is the longest bubble chairlift in the world. The American Eagle was replaced with a chondola, combining high-speed six-pack chairs with eight passenger gondola cabins. The opening of both lifts was delayed by various technical complications and issues, including one gondola cabin falling off American Eagle due to a grip failure.

For the 2019 season, Leitner-Poma constructed a triple chairlift running from the bottom of Blackjack to the summit of Tucker Mountain. Named Three Bears, the lift services expert-only terrain previously only available by hiking or a weather-permitting snowcat ride available for a few hours a day on weekends. Also in 2019, additional towers were added to the American Flyer to combat areas of heavy sag on the uphill line.

For the 2024 season, Leitner-Poma reconstructed the Timberline lift to a new 6-chair high-speed lift (HSS) to significantly increase its hourly passenger capacity.

== Location ==
The closest town is Frisco, 8 miles (13 km) east on the southwest shore of Dillon Reservoir. Nearby resorts within Summit County include Breckenridge, Keystone, and Arapahoe Basin, all just west of the Continental Divide and past the Eisenhower Tunnel on the way from Denver.

The Eagles Nest Wilderness is immediately north of Copper Mountain. Across I-70 are the Gore Range Trail and Wheeler Lakes Trail. The North Tenmile Creek Trail and Meadow Creek Trail descend into Frisco from the Gore Range Trail.

== Climate ==
There is a SNOTEL weather station for Copper Mountain. At 10550 ft (3216 m), Copper Mountain has a subalpine climate (Köppen Dfc).

Climate data for Copper Mountain, Colorado, 1991–2020 normals, 1985-2020 extremes: 10550ft (3216m)
Month	Jan	Feb	Mar	Apr	May	Jun	Jul	Aug	Sep	Oct	Nov	Dec	Year
Record high °F (°C)	58 (14)	55 (13)	65 (18)	65 (18)	73 (23)	81 (27)	81 (27)	80 (27)	74 (23)	70 (21)	64 (18)	54 (12)	81 (27)
Mean maximum °F (°C)	46.8 (8.2)	47.9 (8.8)	54.2 (12.3)	58.9 (14.9)	65.7 (18.7)	73.4 (23.0)	76.4 (24.7)	72.8 (22.7)	69.4 (20.8)	62.1 (16.7)	51.9 (11.1)	45.2 (7.3)	76.9 (24.9)
Mean daily maximum °F (°C)	30.6 (−0.8)	33.2 (0.7)	40.1 (4.5)	45.5 (7.5)	54.0 (12.2)	63.9 (17.7)	68.9 (20.5)	65.8 (18.8)	59.7 (15.4)	48.9 (9.4)	37.2 (2.9)	29.9 (−1.2)	48.1 (9.0)
Daily mean °F (°C)	18.0 (−7.8)	19.9 (−6.7)	26.2 (−3.2)	32.2 (0.1)	40.7 (4.8)	49.1 (9.5)	54.2 (12.3)	52.0 (11.1)	46.1 (7.8)	36.4 (2.4)	24.7 (−4.1)	17.6 (−8.0)	34.8 (1.5)
Mean daily minimum °F (°C)	5.4 (−14.8)	6.6 (−14.1)	12.2 (−11.0)	18.8 (−7.3)	27.3 (−2.6)	34.4 (1.3)	39.5 (4.2)	38.3 (3.5)	32.5 (0.3)	23.9 (−4.5)	12.5 (−10.8)	5.3 (−14.8)	21.4 (−5.9)
Mean minimum °F (°C)	−11.6 (−24.2)	−11.1 (−23.9)	−5.4 (−20.8)	3.4 (−15.9)	14.9 (−9.5)	26.7 (−2.9)	33.7 (0.9)	32.8 (0.4)	22.0 (−5.6)	6.1 (−14.4)	−7.6 (−22.0)	−13.3 (−25.2)	−16.8 (−27.1)
Record low °F (°C)	−21 (−29)	−26 (−32)	−14 (−26)	−8 (−22)	3 (−16)	18 (−8)	24 (−4)	22 (−6)	8 (−13)	−8 (−22)	−27 (−33)	−30 (−34)	−30 (−34)
Average precipitation inches (mm)	2.94 (75)	2.88 (73)	3.10 (79)	3.61 (92)	2.44 (62)	1.15 (29)	1.70 (43)	2.18 (55)	1.62 (41)	2.03 (52)	2.56 (65)	2.51 (64)	28.72 (730)
Average extreme snow depth inches (cm)	43.7 (111)	52.2 (133)	56.7 (144)	55.3 (140)	41.1 (104)	10.0 (25)	0.1 (0.25)	0.1 (0.25)	1.2 (3.0)	8.5 (22)	17.5 (44)	31.8 (81)	59.0 (150)
Average precipitation days (≥ 0.01 in)	14.8	14.5	15.5	15.6	11.0	5.9	8.7	10.3	8.2	9.2	12.0	12.9	138.6
Source 1: XMACIS2
Source 2: NOAA (precip/precip days)

== Resort ==
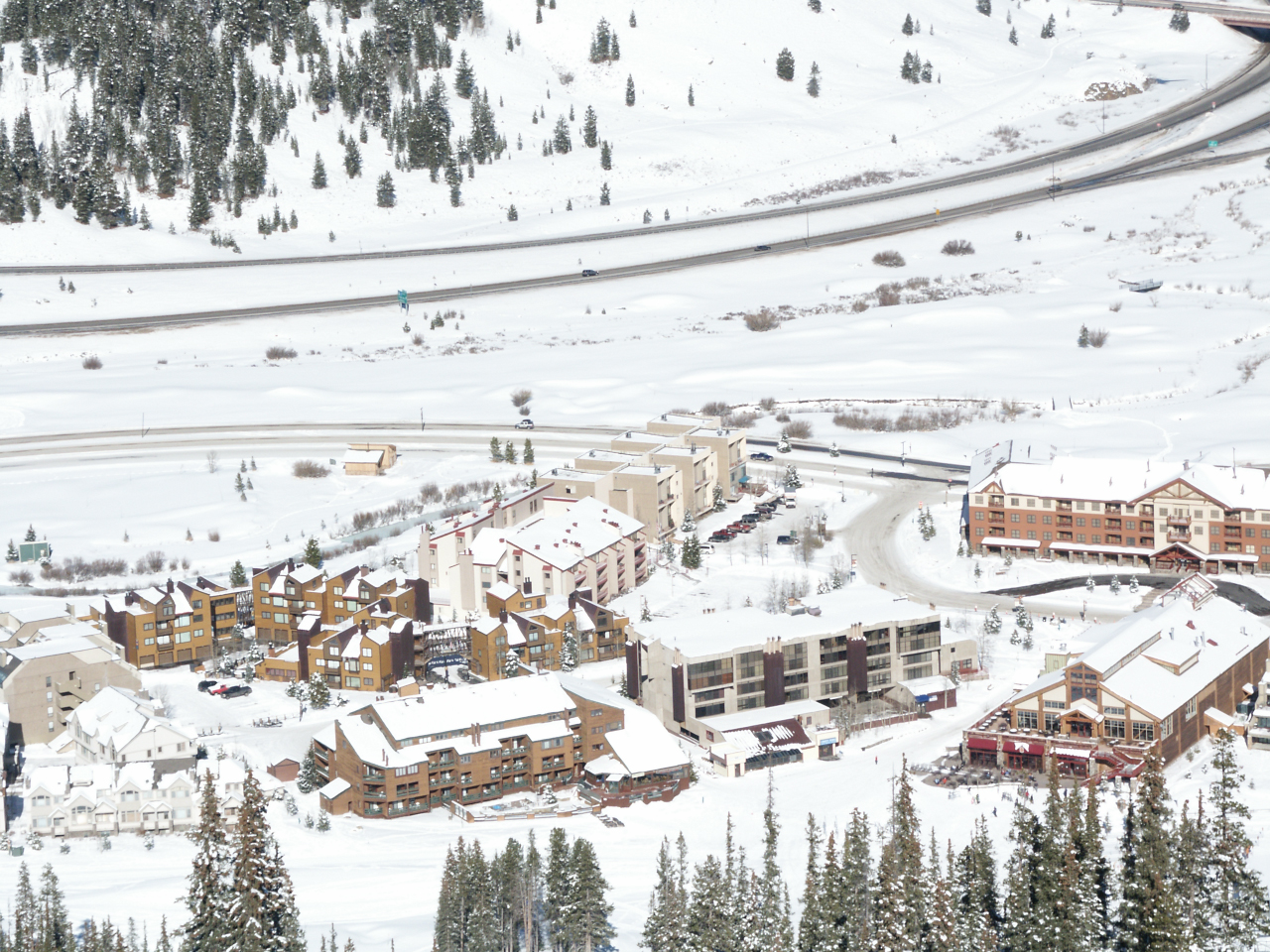
East Village

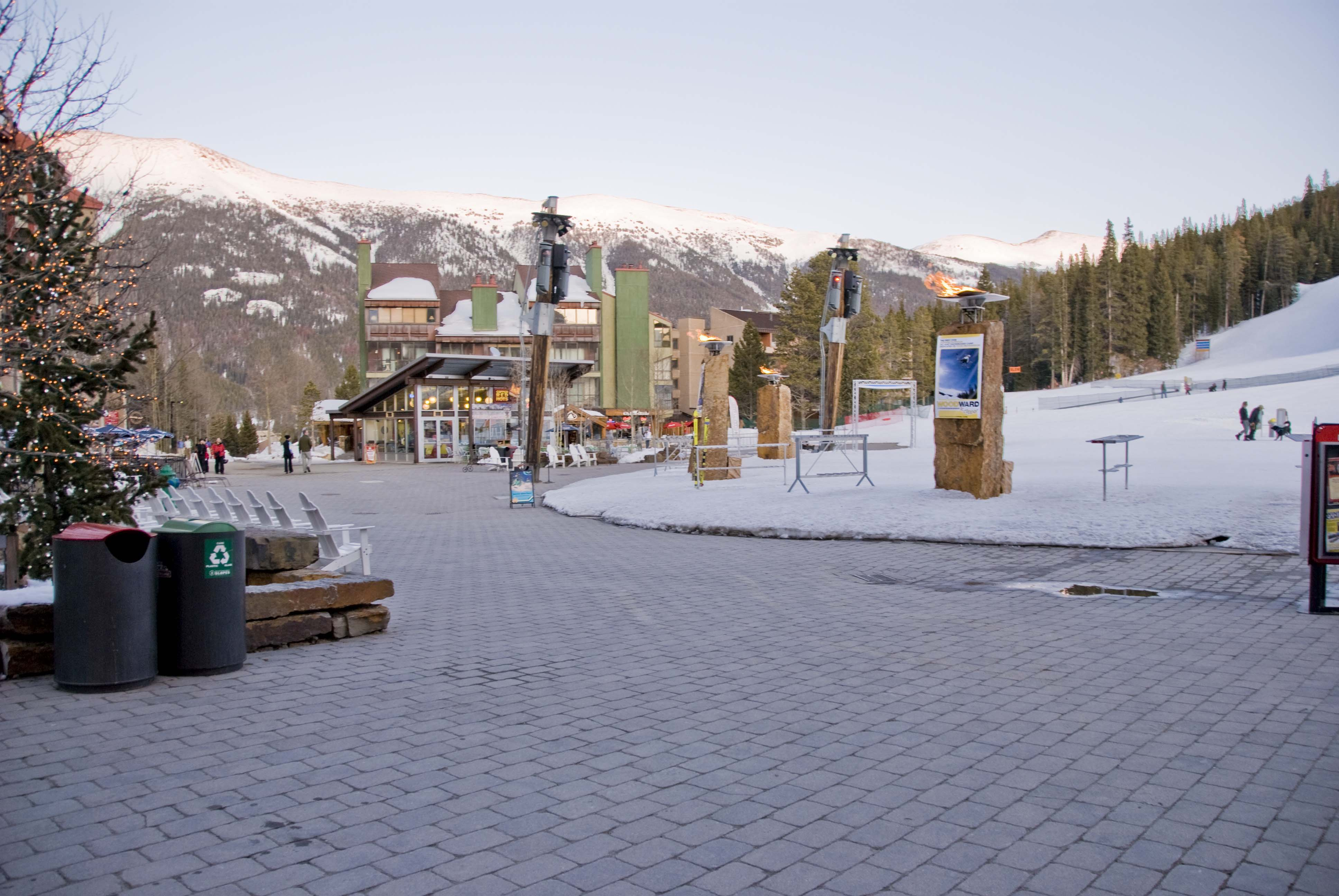
Center Village

The lodging, dining, and entertainment facilities at Copper Mountain are divided into three villages: East Village, The Village at Copper (AKA Center Village), and West Village (formerly Union Creek). The ski area is most notable as being designated by the National Forest Service as having the most organized skier layout of any ski resort. The beginner runs are located entirely to the west and graduate evenly in difficulty as the lifts progress to the east. They are isolated from the busier and more difficult runs in a natural fashion. Similarly, the intermediate runs are located even more to the east and develop in difficulty in a smooth manner. More difficult runs are to the far east, with the most difficult runs being on the backside. The most southern Tucker Mountain provides only double black diamond runs and one single black run.

Olympic medalist Putzi Frandl worked at Copper Mountain as a ski instructor for many years beginning in 1984.

=== Summit House East ===
Summit House East is a condominium complex located in the East Village. Constructed in 1973 as part of the early development of the East Village area, the building contains 32 condominium units and one commercial space. It is situated approximately 300 yards from the Super Bee chairlift, adjacent to the eighth hole of the Copper Creek Championship Golf Course and overlooking the third green.

The homeowners association for Summit House East was incorporated on February 3, 1975, under the Colorado Nonprofit Corporation Act. The complex remains an active part of Copper Mountain’s East Village real estate community, with unit sales and property activity regularly noted in local real estate reports.

According to Copper Mountain’s official overview, Summit House East and other East Village developments were built in the early 1970s as part of the resort’s initial expansion phase.

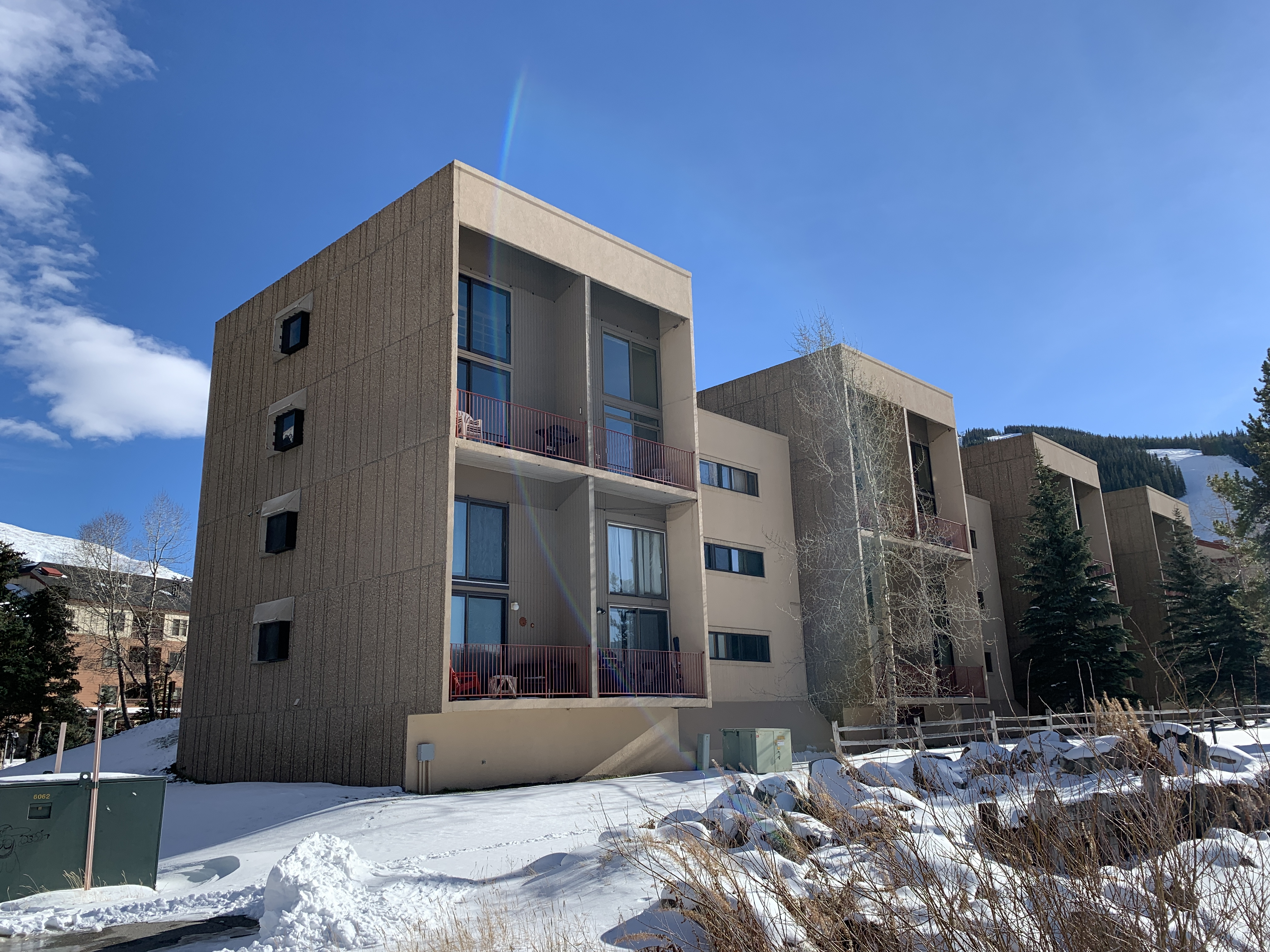
Exterior view of northwest corner of Summit House East.

== Statistics ==
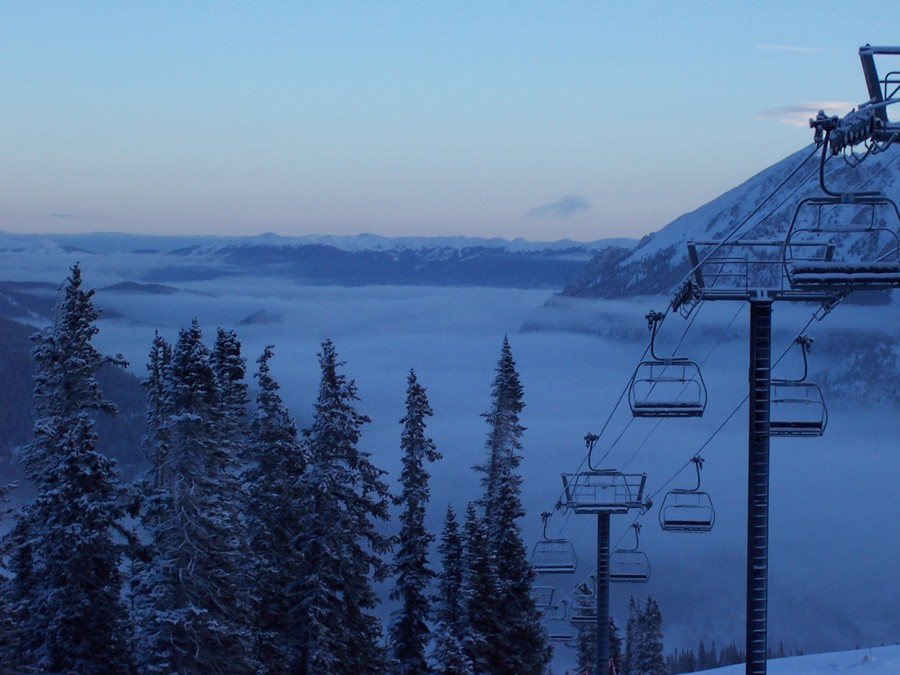
Early morning fog, top of the American Flyer lift, 2006

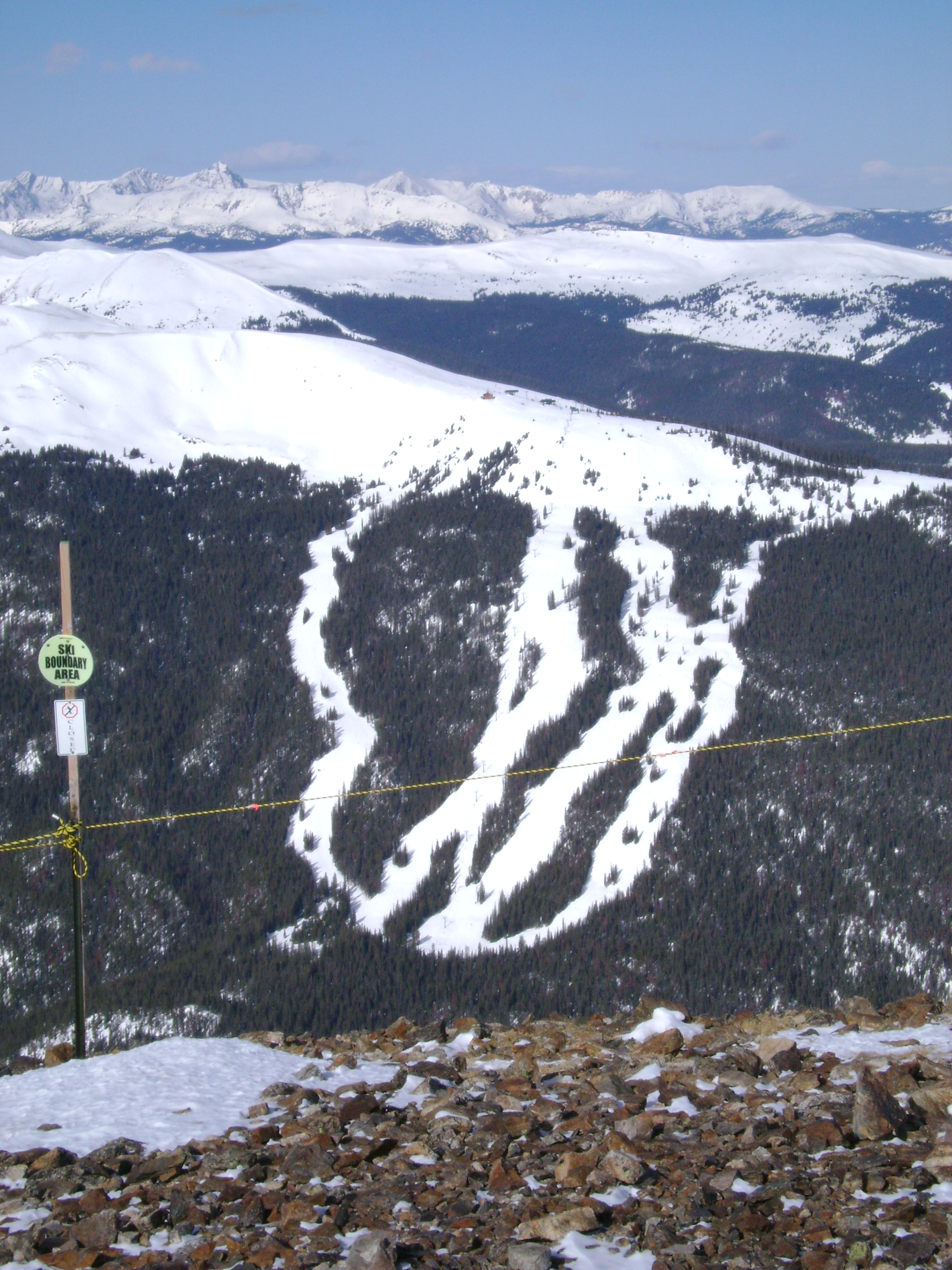
Resolution Bowl as seen from the top of Peak 8 at Breckenridge

=== Elevation ===
- Summit: 12,313 ft (3,753 m)
- Base: 9,712 ft (2,960 m)
- Vertical: 2,601 ft (793 m)

=== Slope Aspects ===
- North: 55%
- South: 5%
- East: 25%
- West: 15%

=== Trails ===
- Trails: 150 total (25% beginner, 24% intermediate, 34% advanced, 17% expert)
- Acres: 2,490 acres (10.1 km^{2})
- Average annual snowfall: 310 in (790 cm)
- Snow-making 05/06 : 380 acres (1.5 km^{2})
- Bowls: 5 (Resolution, Spaulding, Copper, Jupiter, Union)
- Peaks: 3 (Copper, Tucker, Union)

=== Lifts ===
Copper Mountain has 19 chairlifts, and 6 magic carpets.

Name	Type	Builder	Built	Vertical (feet)	Length (feet)	Notes
American Eagle	Chondola	Leitner-Poma	2018	1484	6211	Hybrid chairlift, with one eight-person gondola for every four six-person chairs.
American Flyer	High speed six pack	Leitner-Poma	2018	1904	9886	Longest bubble chairlift in the world.
Super Bee	High speed six pack	Leitner-Poma	1998	2293	8870	Main lift out of East Village basin.
Timberline Express		Leitner-Poma	2024	-	-	Replaced Doppelmayr quad. Direct drive.
Excelerator	High Speed Quad	Leitner-Poma	1998	846	3216	
Kokomo Express	High Speed Quad	Doppelmayr	2017	362	2923	
Woodward Express	High Speed Quad	Doppelmayr	2011	1006	4819	Main lift for the Woodward terrain parks, previously known as the Union Creek Quad.
Three Bears	Triple	Leitner-Poma	2019	1158	3166	
Lumberjack	Triple	Poma	1981	702	4300	
Resolution	Triple	Poma	1985	1417	4381	
Rendezvous	Triple	Yan	1982	502	3367	Modified with Doppelmayr chairs and sheaves.
Sierra	Triple	Yan	1983	773	3108	Modified with Doppelmayr chairs and sheaves.
Alpine	Double	Yan	1979	1726	5586	Return station replaced by Doppelmayr in 2022.
Pitchfork	Double	Yan	1979	66	535	Reused Heron-Poma chairs and towers.
Blackjack	Double	Yan	1995	744	n/a	Relocated from Copper’s front side. The return station was replaced in 2019 by Skytrac.
Mountain Chief	Double	Yan	1995	814	2365	Relocated from Copper's front side. Modified with Doppelmayr sheaves.
Storm King	T-Bar	Doppelmayr	2013	463	2034	
Celebrity Ridge	Platter	Doppelmayr	2013	263	879	
Gem	Platter	Heron-Poma	1972	70	618	Oldest remaining original lift at Copper Mountain.

== In popular culture ==
The resort was the central location for the 1983 film Copper Mountain.

The ski scenes in the 1994 film Dumb and Dumber were filmed at Copper. The chairlift used was the E-Chair, which has since been replaced by the Excelerator High Speed Quad.
