= Gilman, Colorado =

- Town
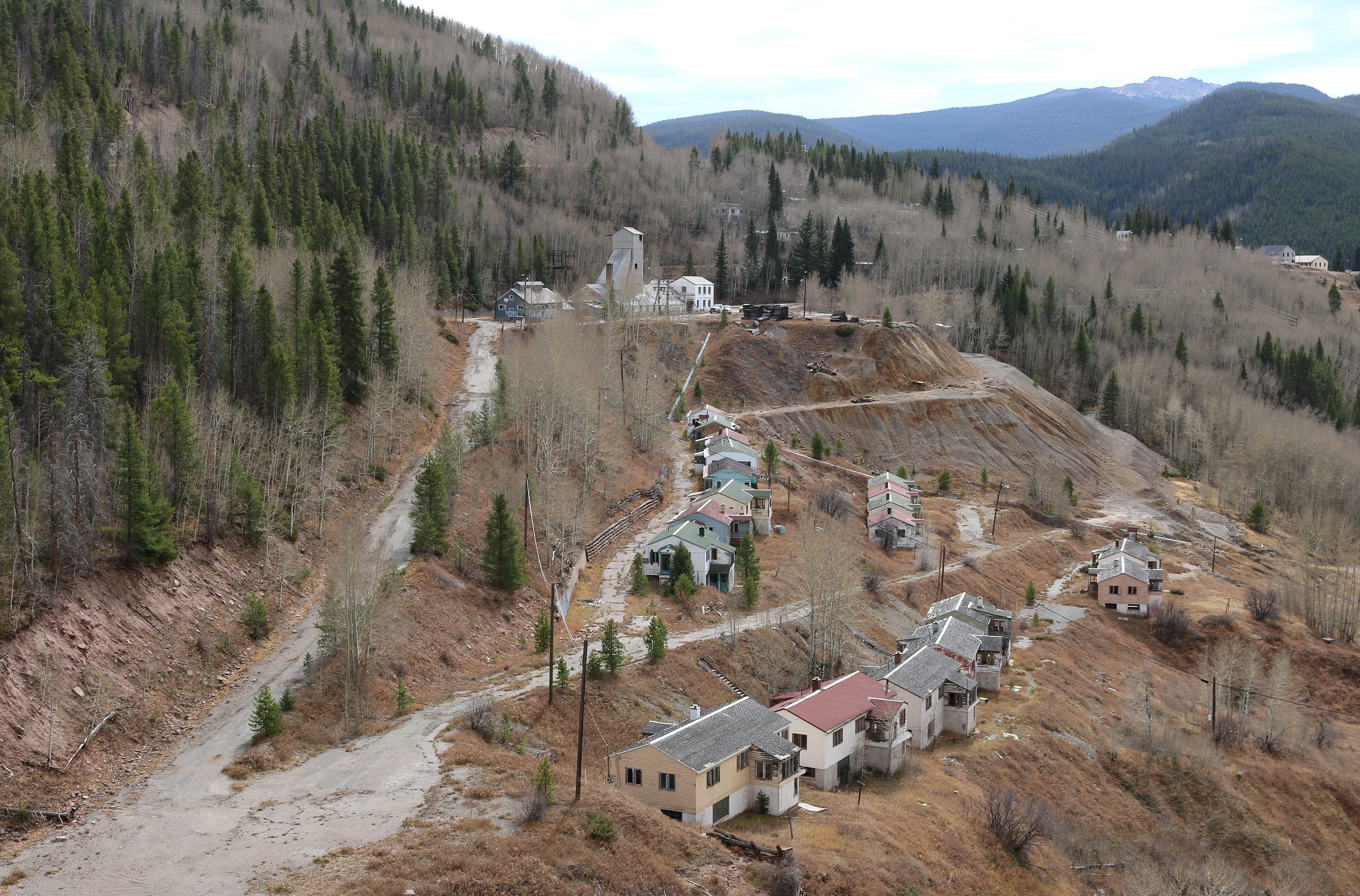
- Gilman in 2020, showing the abandoned houses and part of the old mine
- Interactive map of Gilman, Colorado
- Coordinates: 39°31′58″N 106°23′38″W
- Country: United States
- State: Colorado
- Counties: Eagle
- Founded: 1886
- Elevation: 8,951 ft (2,728 m)
- Time zone: UTC-7 (MST)
  - Summer (DST): UTC-6 (MDT)
- ZIP code: 81645
- GNIS town ID: 204669

Gilman is an abandoned mining town in southeastern Eagle County, Colorado, United States. The Gilman post office operated from November 3, 1886, until April 22, 1986. The U.S. Post Office at Minturn (ZIP Code 81645) now serves Gilman postal addresses.

Founded in 1886 during the Colorado Silver Boom, the town later became a center of lead and zinc mining in Colorado, centered on the now-flooded Eagle Mine. It was abandoned in 1984 by order of the Environmental Protection Agency because of toxic pollutants, including contamination of the ground water, as well as unprofitability of the mines. It is currently a ghost town on private property and is strictly off limits to the public. At the time of the abandonment, the mining operations were owned by Gulf and Western Industries.

In 2007, The Ginn Company had plans to build a private ski resort with private home sites across Battle Mountain --- including development at the Gilman townsite. On February 27, 2008, the Minturn Town Council unanimously approved annexation and development plans for 4,300 acres (6.7 sq mi; 17 km^{2}) of Ginn Resorts’ 1,700-unit Battle Mountain residential ski and golf resort; Ginn's Battle Mountain development includes much of the old Gilman townsite. On May 20, 2008, the town of Minturn approved the annexation in a public referendum with 87% of the vote. As of September 9, 2009 the Ginn Company has backed out of development plans for the Battle Mountain Property. Crave Real Estate Ventures, who was the original finance to Ginn, took over day-to-day operations of the property.

== Description ==
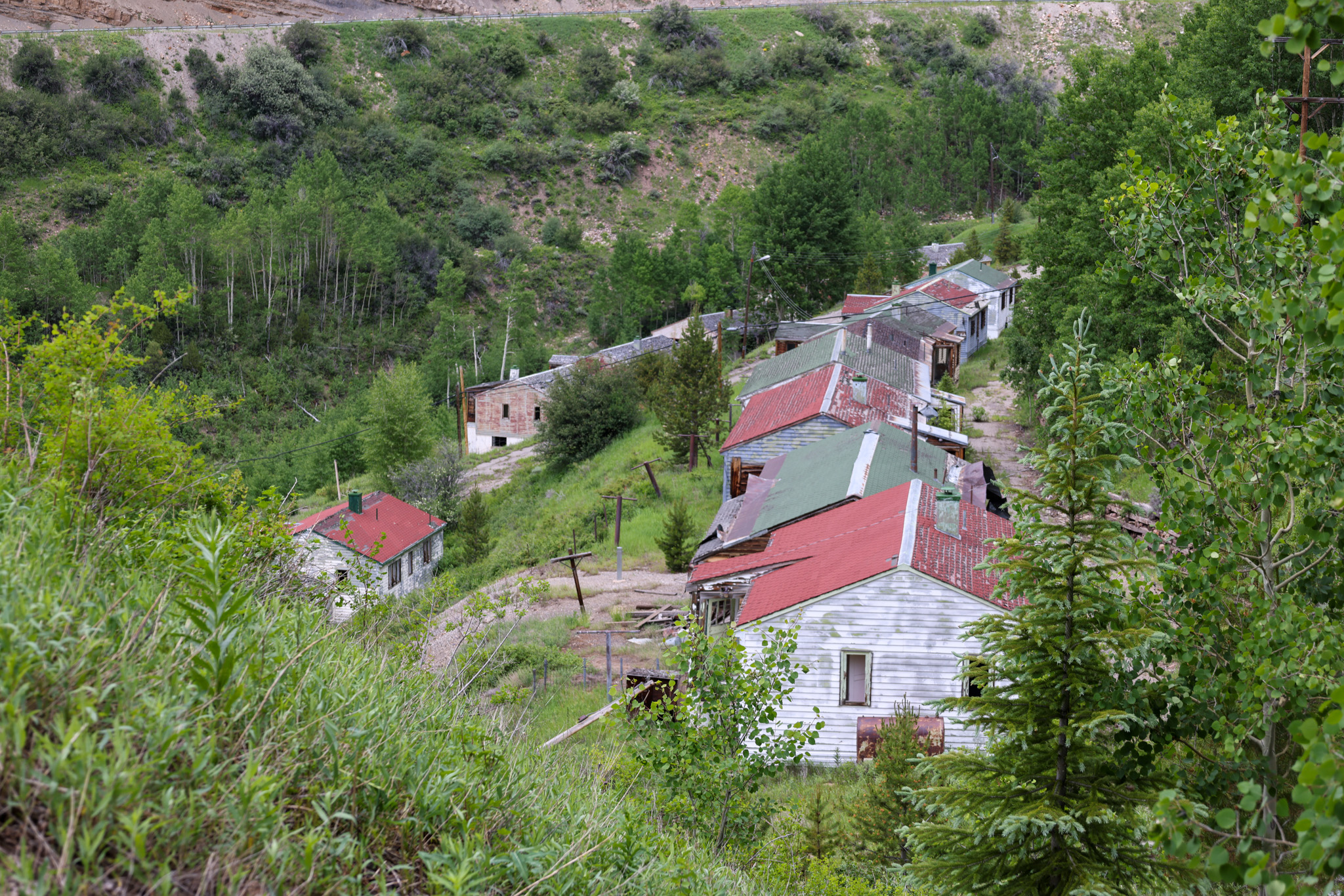
Gilman in 2023, outside of the abandoned village houses.

The town sits at an elevation of 8,950 ft (2,730 m) on a dramatic 600-foot (180 m) cliff above the Eagle River on the flank of Battle Mountain. It is located southeast of Minturn and north of Tennessee Pass along U.S. Highway 24. The remnants of the townsite are visible in many places along the curves of the highway. More recent housing is situated on the steep flank of the mountain itself near the former mines.

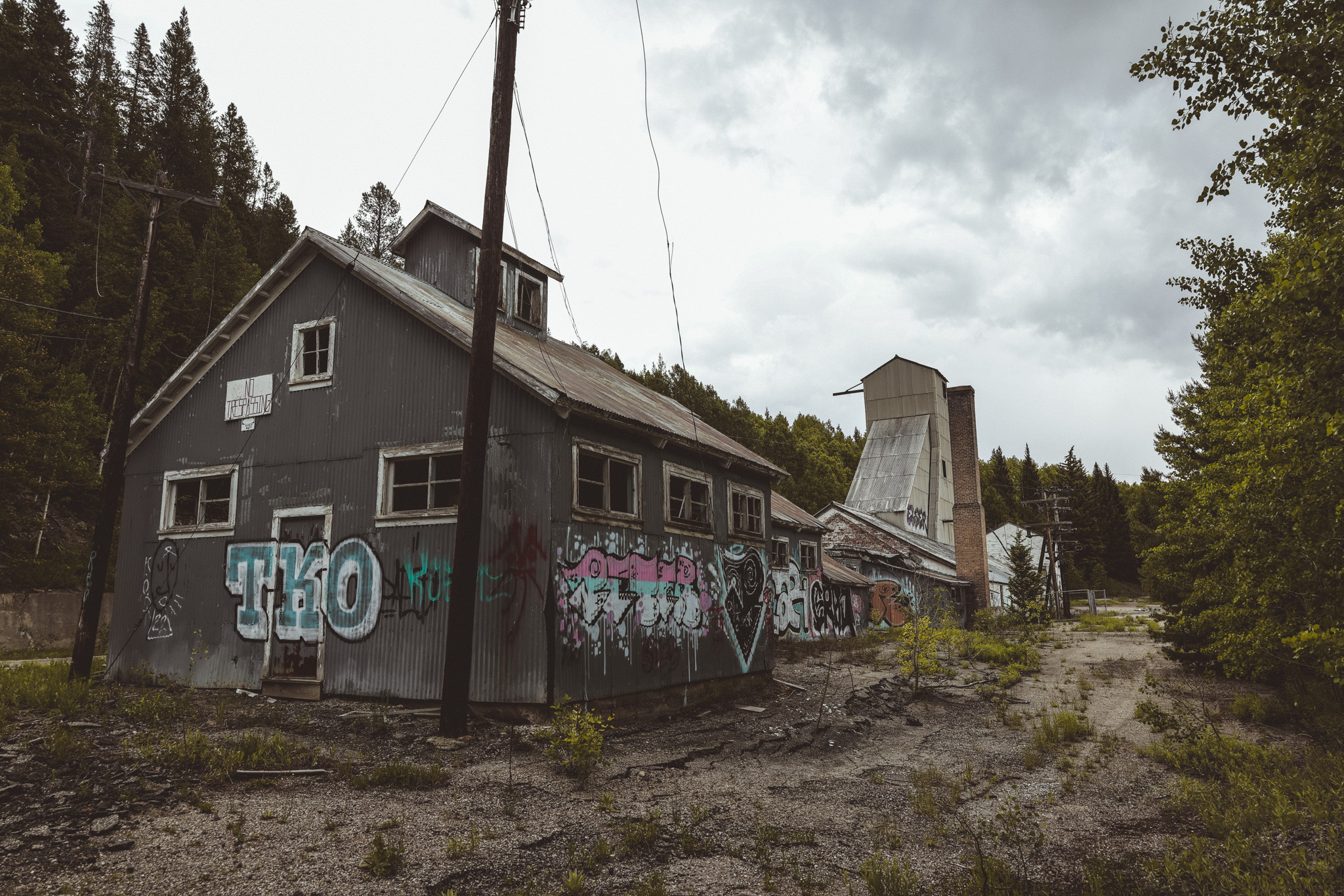
This photo was taken outside the mines with an entrance. The building on the far right has an entrance to an elevator (faulty)

The mining district became the richest and most successful in Eagle County. The ore occurs in sulfide replacement deposits of three types: 1) thin-bedded deposits in the Sawatch Quartzite, (2) highly elongated ore bodies in the Leadville Limestone (here completely dolomitized), and (3) vertical pipes or chimneys cutting across the various formations. The ore minerals in order of decreasing abundance are sphalerite, chalcopyrite, and galena. The non-ore minerals pyrite and siderite are also abundant in the ore bodies.

== History ==
Several mining operations had sprouted along Battle Mountain by 1879, the first year of the Colorado Silver Boom. The town of Gilman and nearby mining operations were developed in the 1880s by John Clinton, a prospector, judge, and speculator from nearby Red Cliff. In 1887, gold and silver were discovered in two vertical chimneys at the Ground Hog Mine, which continued to produce gold and silver ore until the 1920s.

In the 1880s, Clinton acquired a number of mining operations in the vicinity, including the profitable Iron Mask, noted for its numerous caverns with crystal formations. Clinton developed the area as a town and improved the mining operations with higher capitalization. The town, which Clinton developed in order to keep miners at the site, was initially named for him. He donated the land for its initial schoolhouse and built its first boarding house. The Denver and Rio Grande Railroad reached the mining camp of Belden at the base of the cliff in 1882. By 1899, it had a population of approximately 300, as well as a newspaper, called the Gilman Enterprise.

As they reached the deeper primary sulfide ores, the miners found that the ore contained so much zinc that the smelters refused to buy it. A roaster and magnetic separator were installed in 1905 to separate out the zinc minerals, turning the problem into an asset. The mining operations transitioned increasingly to zinc, although the Eagle Mine was still the leading producer of silver in the state in 1930.

The New Jersey Zinc Company entered Gilman in 1912, and over a period of years bought all the principal mines and the entire townsite. Zinc was the economic mainstay until 1931, when low zinc prices forced the company to switch to mining copper-silver ores. Zinc production resumed in 1941, and remained the principal product of the mines until they were closed in the 1980s.

The town population was a few hundred in the 1960s. At one time, the town had an infirmary, grocery store, and bowling alley. The town experienced labor strife several times in the 1950s, partly inflamed by the out-of-state corporate ownership. By 1970, total production at the mines was 10 million tons of ore; 393,000 troy ounces (12,200 kg) of gold; 66,000,000 troy ounces (2,100,000 kg) of silver; 105,000 tons of copper; 148,000 tons of lead; and 858,000 tons of zinc.

After the closure of the mine and the abandonment of the town, a 235-acre (0.95 km^{2}) area, which included 8 million tons of mine waste, were designated a Superfund site by the EPA and placed on the National Priorities List in 1986.

== Current status ==
The townsite is a victim of vandalization, and the town's main street is heavily tagged. There are only a few intact windows left in town, as twenty years of vandalism have left almost every glass object in the town destroyed.

However, many parts of the town are almost as they were when the mine shut down. The main shaft elevators still sit ready for ore cars, permanently locked at the top level. Several cars and trucks still sit in their garages, left behind by their owners.

Because of its size, modernity and level of preservation, the town is also the subject of interest for many historians, explorers, and photographers.

== See also ==
- List of ghost towns in Colorado
