= Homestake Creek =

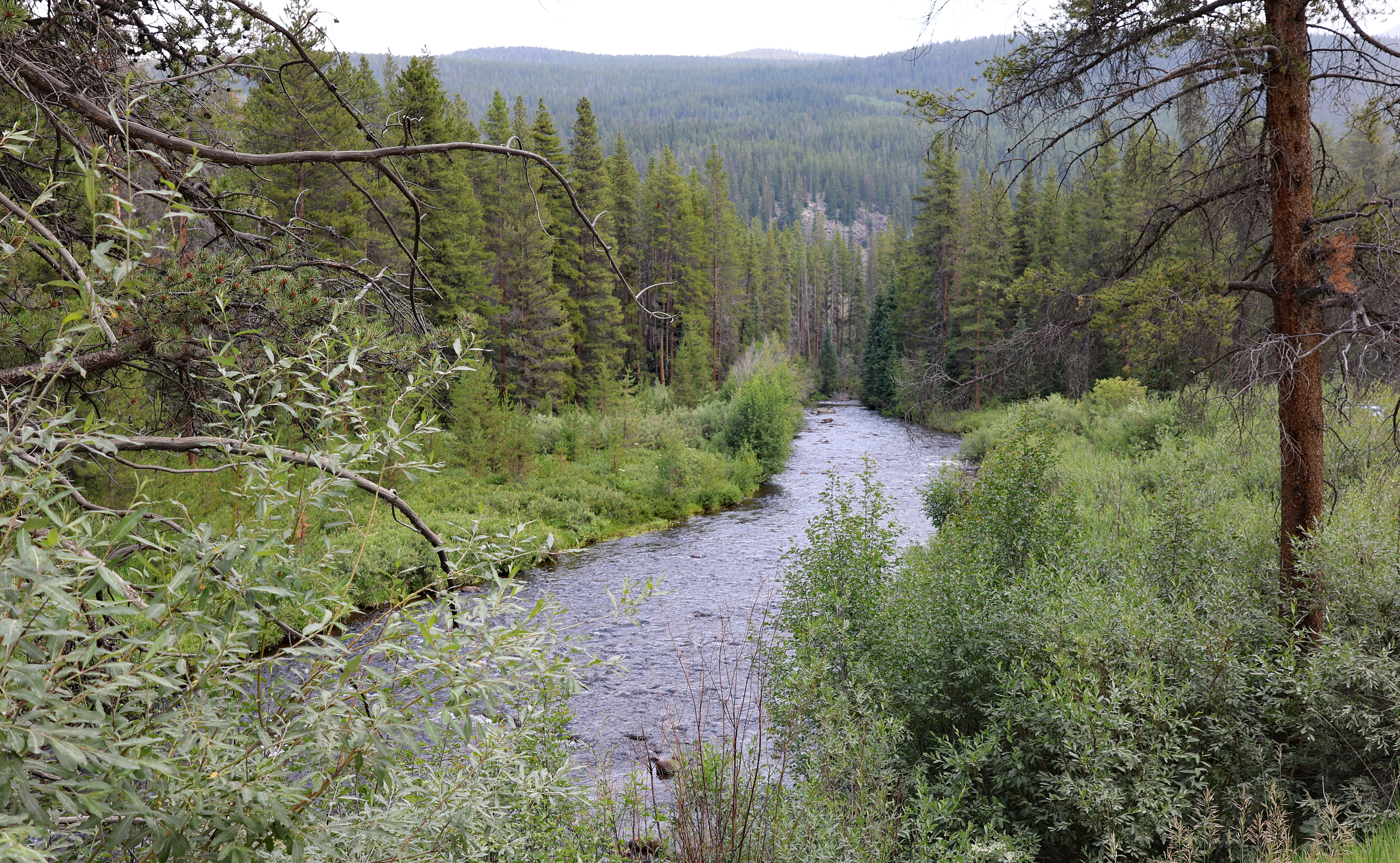
- The creek in the Homestake Valley

- Location of Homestake Creek's mouth in Colorado

Physical characteristics
- Source
  - location: Confluence of East Fork Homestake Creek and Middle Fork Homestake Creek
  - coordinates: 39°22′28.74″N 106°27′30.32″W
- Mouth
  - location: Confluence with the Eagle River
  - coordinates: 39°30′26.35″N 106°22′42.18″W
  - elevation: 8,573 feet (2,613 meters)

Basin features
- Progression: Eagle, Colorado
- Tributaries
  - left: Middle Fork Homestake Creek, Missouri Creek, French Creek, Whitney Creek, Girard Creek
  - right: East Fork Homestake Creek

Homestake Creek is a tributary of the Eagle River in Eagle County, Colorado. Homestake Dam impounds one of the creek's tributaries, Middle Fork Homestake Creek. Homestake Creek itself begins just below the dam, at the confluence of its east and middle forks.

== Course ==
From its origination point just below the Homestake Dam, the creek flows northeast down the Homestake Valley, generally following Homestake Road (Forest Road 703.1). The valley ends at U.S. Highway 24, and from here the creek generally follows the highway towards the north, to its confluence with the Eagle River at Red Cliff, Colorado, below the Red Cliff Bridge.

== Homestake Valley ==
The creek flows through the Homestake Valley in Eagle County, Colorado and within the White River National Forest and over some private land. The Holy Cross Wilderness surrounds the valley.

A glacial valley, it is known for its diversity of animals and plants and for its fens, a type of wetland. The road through the valley, Homestake Road, was built in the 1880s, originally as a stagecoach road to reach the gold mining camp at Gold Park (now a Forest Service campground) and partway to extinct towns such as Holy Cross City via a road that branches off from Homestake Road. These two areas were part of the Holy Cross Mining District.

The road through the valley is 10.82 miles (17.41 kilometers) long and has a starting elevation of 8,938 feet (2,724 meters) and an ending elevation of 10,278 feet (3,133 meters). It is popular with winter sports enthusiasts, especially snowshoers, cross-country skiers, and snowmobilers. Elk are known to winter in the valley.

== Monitoring station ==
The U.S.G.S. maintains a stream gauge along the creek at the Gold Park Campground in the Homestake Valley.

== See also ==
- List of rivers of Colorado
