= South Fork Eagle River =

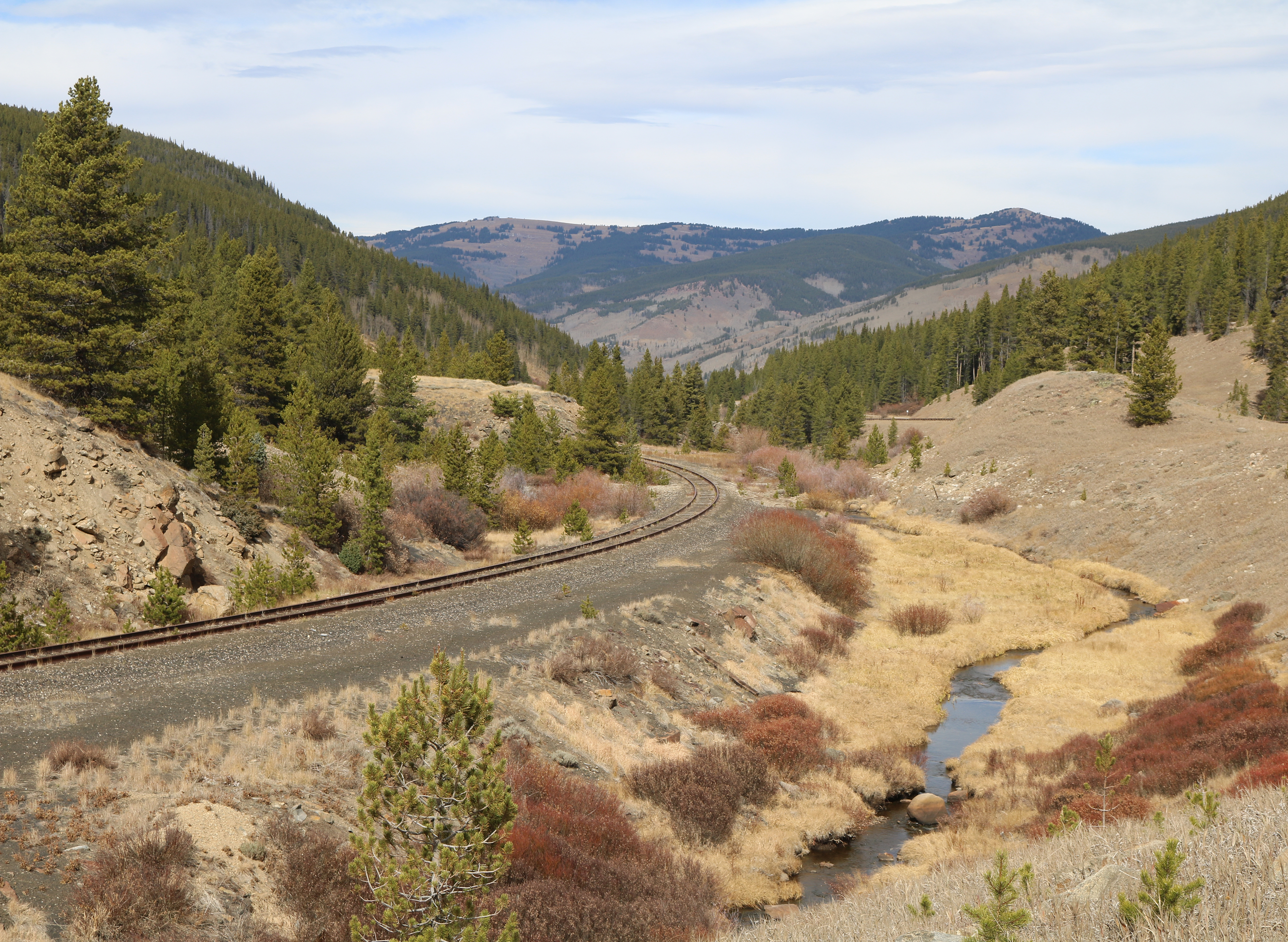
- The river north of Tennessee Pass

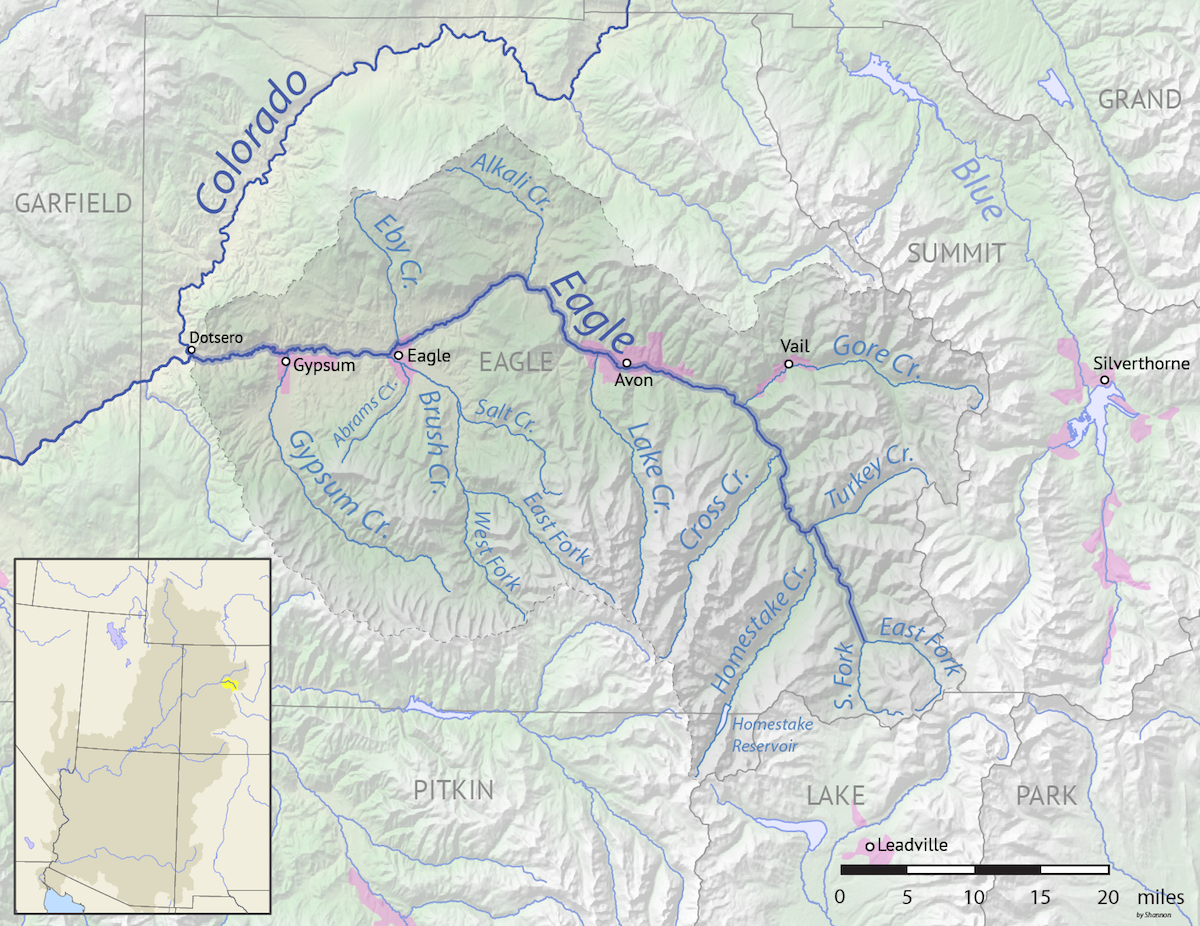
- Eagle River drainage basin, with South Fork at bottom right

Physical characteristics
- Source
  - coordinates: 39°21′43″N 106°16′14″W
- Mouth
  - location: Confluence with East Fork
  - coordinates: 39°25′18″N 106°18′48″W
  - elevation: 9,295 ft (2,833 m)

Basin features
- Progression: Eagle—Colorado

South Fork Eagle River is a 6.9-mile-long (11.1 km) tributary of the Eagle River in Eagle County, Colorado. The river flows from a source east of Tennessee Pass in the White River National Forest to a confluence with the East Fork Eagle River that forms the Eagle River.

== See also ==
- List of rivers of Colorado
- List of tributaries of the Colorado River
