= East Fork Eagle River =

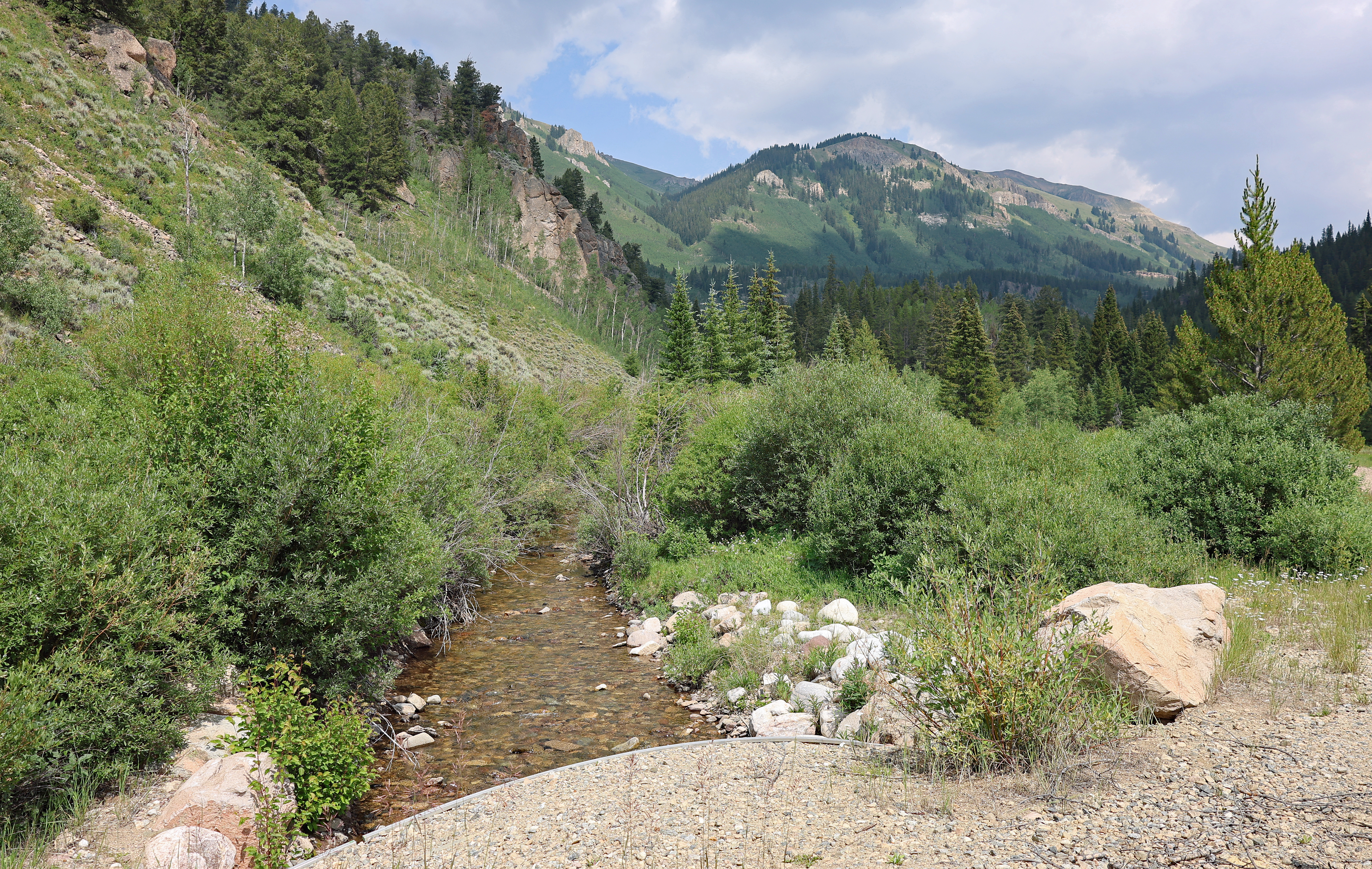
- The river in the Camp Hale-Continental Divide National Monument

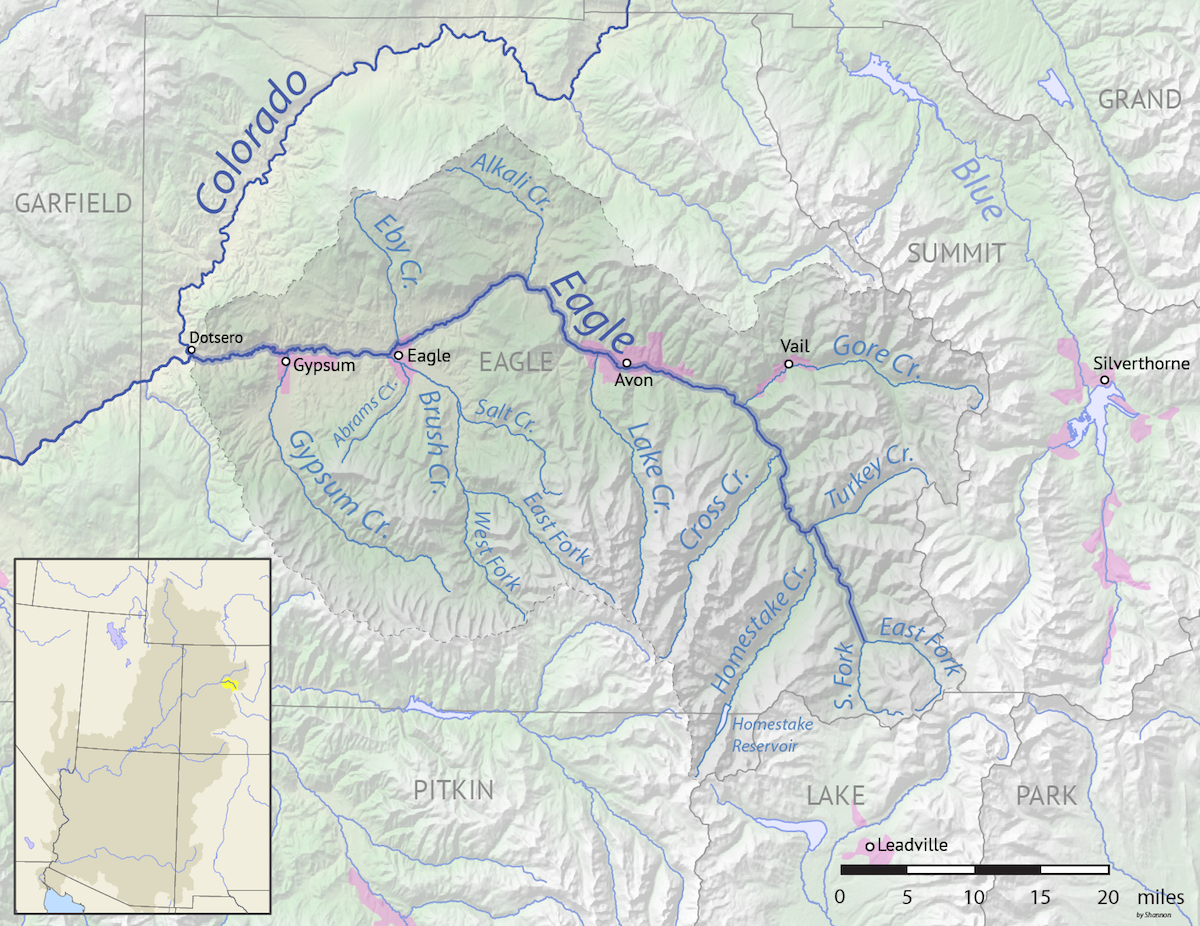
- Eagle River drainage basin, with East Fork at bottom right

Physical characteristics
- Source
  - coordinates: 39°21′55″N 106°15′17″W
- Mouth
  - location: Confluence with South Fork
  - coordinates: 39°25′18″N 106°18′48″W
  - elevation: 9,295 ft (2,833 m)

Basin features
- Progression: Eagle—Colorado

East Fork Eagle River is an 8.6-mile-long (13.8 km) tributary of the Eagle River in Eagle County, Colorado. The river flows from a source on Chicago Ridge in the White River National Forest to a confluence with the South Fork Eagle River that forms the Eagle River.

== See also ==
- List of rivers of Colorado
- List of tributaries of the Colorado River
