= Homestake Mine =

Homestake Mine is the name for several mines in the United States:

- Homestake Mine (Nevada), listed in the National Register of Historic Places
- Homestake Mine (South Dakota), home of the future Deep Underground Science and Engineering Laboratory
