= Sunflower revolution =

Sunflower Revolution is an event held every fall in Cincinnati, Ohio, that raises funds and awareness about Parkinson's disease. The event benefits the James J. and Joan A. Gardner Center for Parkinson's Disease and Movement Disorders at the University of Cincinnati Neuroscience Institute, a part of UC Health University of Cincinnati. The Sunflower Revolution provides funding for research grants.

Established in 2006 by Parkinson's advocate Kathleen Krumme, the two day event was created as a fund raiser for University of Cincinnati Neuroscience Center and the Davis Phinney Foundation.

A virtual event was held in 2020.

The 2023 event symposium will take place on Saturday August 19, 2023 at the Oasis Golf Club & Event Center in Loveland, Ohio. The walk, run, ride event will take place on Sunday September 10, 2023 at Sawyer Point in downtown Cincinnati.
