= Eagle Mine (Colorado) =

Abandoned mine in Colorado, US

- Eagle Mine
- Location: Colorado, United States; 39°31′40″N 106°23′42″W
- Products: Zinc
- Closed: 1984
- Company: Viacom International

Eagle Mine is an abandoned mine near the ghost town of Gilman and about one mile southeast of Minturn, in the U.S. state of Colorado.

Mining began in the 1880s, initially for gold and silver but focusing predominantly on zinc during later stages of its operation. After the mine's closure in 1984 and the abandonment of Gilman, a 235-acre (0.95 km^{2}) area, which included 8 million tons of mine waste, was designated a Superfund site by the Environmental Protection Agency (EPA) and placed on the National Priorities List in 1986.

Eagle Mine had been owned by the New Jersey Zinc Company, in its later years a subsidiary of Gulf+Western. Viacom International was identified by the EPA as the successor in interest to the mine. According to the EPA, the mining operations left large amounts of arsenic, cadmium, copper, lead, and zinc in the soil and caused large fish die-offs in the Eagle River, threatening drinking water in the town of Minturn downstream on the Eagle River. The cleanup plan, implemented beginning in 1988, included plugging and flooding the mine, collecting and treating mine and ground water in a new treatment plant, as well as removing, treating, and capping the waste products. A report by the EPA in 2000 concluded that cleanup operations had substantially reduced public health risks and improved the water quality in the Eagle River.

== See also ==
- List of Superfund sites in Colorado
- Mining in the United States
