= Homestake Mine (Nevada) =

Coordinates: 35°12′07″N 114°35′46″W

- U.S. National Register of Historic Places
- U.S. Historic district
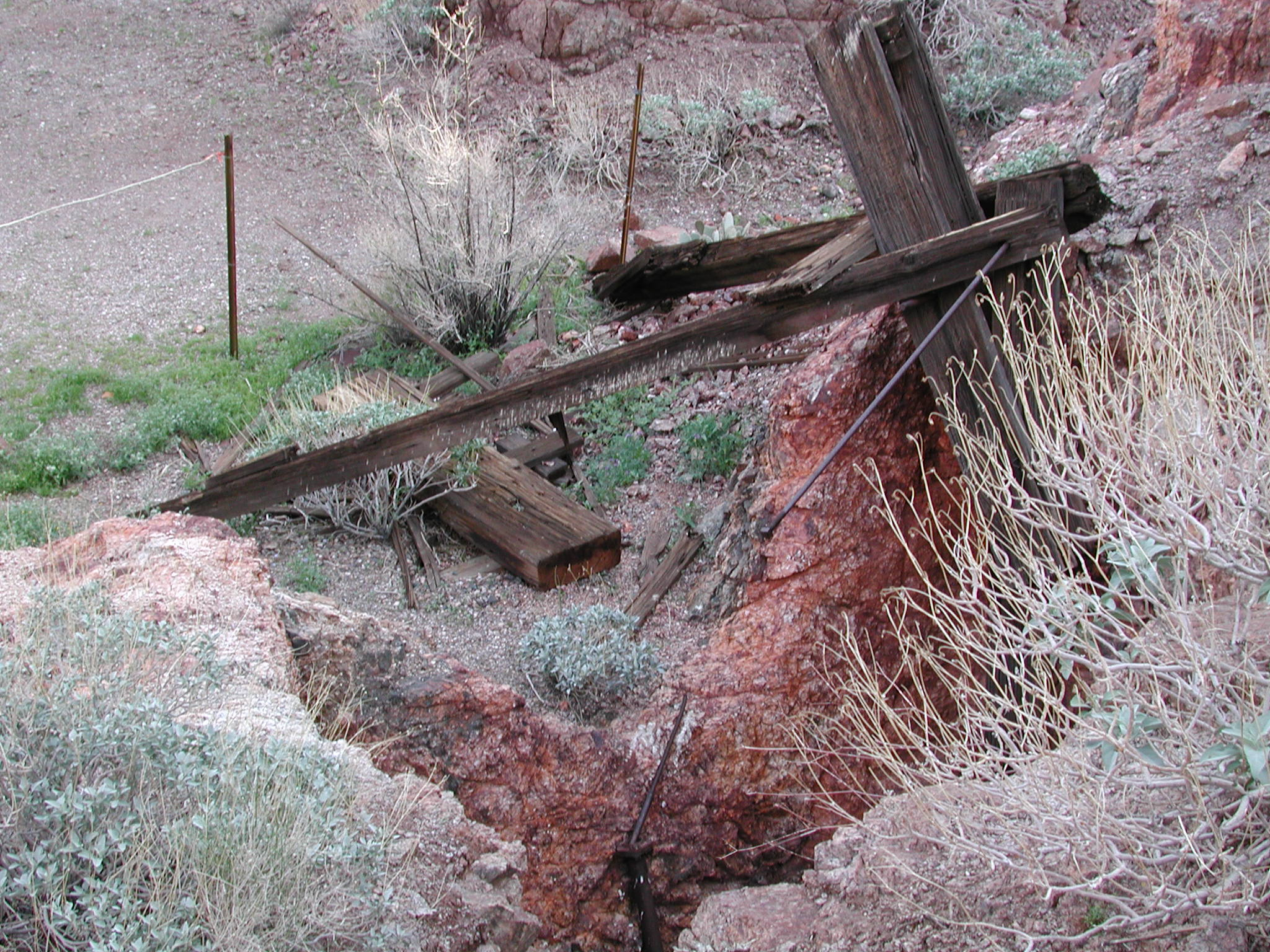

- Location within Nevada Location within the United States
- Location: Clark County, Nevada
- Nearest city: Searchlight, Nevada
- NRHP reference No.: 85001601
- Added to NRHP: July 17, 1985

Homestake Mine is located in the Newberry Mountains near Searchlight, Nevada. It is listed on the United States National Register of Historic Places for activities between 1850 and 1924. Gold and silver were mined.

== History ==
The mine operated from the 1930s to 1953 and tapped the Silver King Vein.

The site was listed on the National Register of Historic Places on July 17, 1985.
