= Homestake Reservoir =

- Homestake Project Reservoir
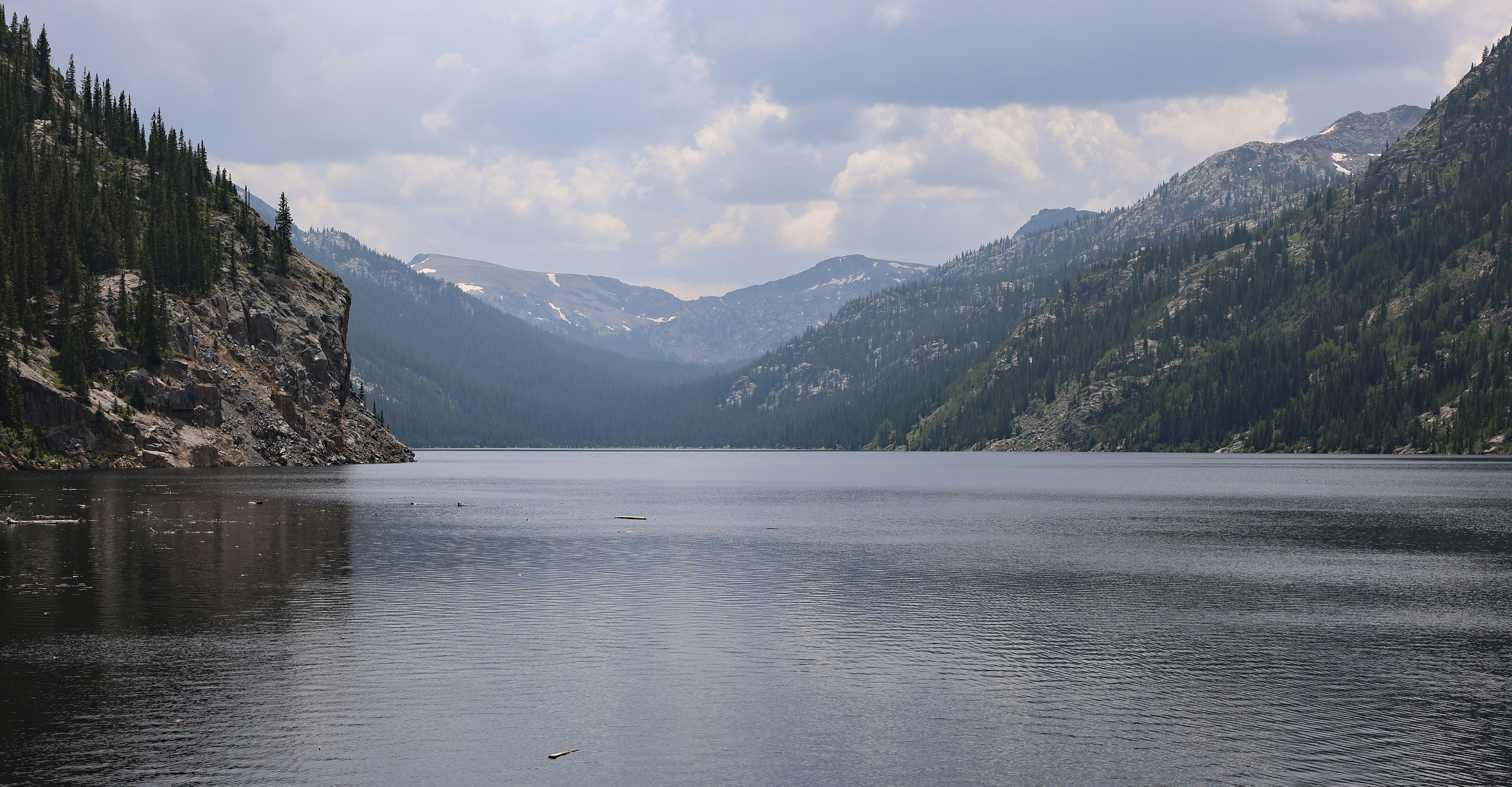
- The reservoir in 2024

- The reservoir's location in Colorado
- Location: Eagle and Pitkin counties, Colorado, U.S.
- Coordinates: 39°21′28.32″N 106°28′4.84″W
- Type: reservoir
- Primary inflows: Middle Fork Homestake Creek, several inlet tunnels from nearby creeks
- Primary outflows: Middle Fork Homestake Creek, Homestake Tunnel
- Basin countries: United States
- Managing agency: Cities of Aurora and Colorado Springs, Colorado
- Built: 1967
- Water volume: 45,500 acre-feet (56,100,000 cubic meters)
- Surface elevation: 10,266 feet (3,129 meters)
- Frozen: Freezes in winter

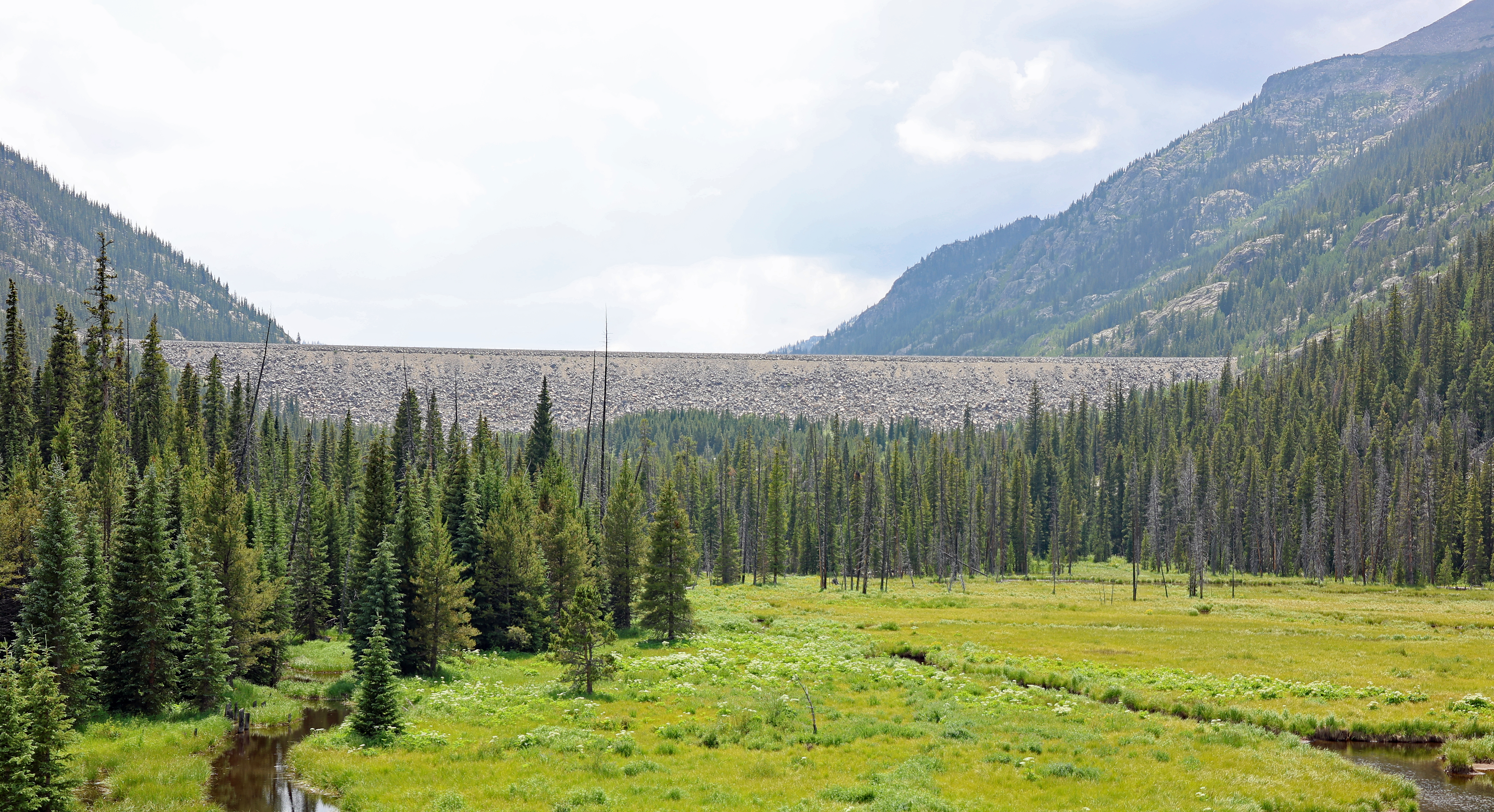
The dam

Homestake Reservoir is a reservoir in Eagle and Pitkin counties, Colorado, U.S. The reservoir collects and stores water for the municipal water supply of the cities of Aurora and Colorado Springs, Colorado. It lies at an elevation of over 10,000 feet (3,000 meters) in a remote area of Colorado's northern Sawatch Range.

== Dam ==
The Homestake Dam, NID ID CO00673, is a 265-foot (81-meter) high asphalt-lined earthen dam that can store up to 45,500 acre-feet (56,100,000 cubic meters) of water. It was built in 1967 and is 1,996 feet (608 meters) wide. It is also called the Homestake Project Dam and the John P. Elliott Dam.

== Recreation ==
The reservoir is surrounded by the Holy Cross Wilderness. The Homestake Valley lies between the dam and U.S. Highway 24 and offers hiking, fishing, and camping.
