= Davis Phinney Foundation =

US nonprofit organization

- Founded: 2004
- Founder: Davis Phinney
- Tax ID no.: 20-0813566
- Purpose: Parkinson's disease information and tools for living well
- Location: Boulder, Colorado
- Key people: Davis Phinney (Founder & Director) Connie Carpenter-Phinney (Board Chair); Polly Dawkins (Executive Director); Chris Brewer (Director of Development)
- Website: davisphinneyfoundation.org

The Davis Phinney Foundation is a non-profit to help people with Parkinson's live well with the disease. It was founded in 2004 by Davis Phinney, a former professional road bicycle racer and 1984 Olympic medal winner. Today, Davis is a figure in the cycling community and people living with Parkinson's (estimated 60,000 Americans and estimated 10 million worldwide).

The Foundation is a 501(c)(3) public charity that functions without an endowment and depends on donations from individuals, foundations and corporations. It reaches an international audience through its programs and online programming.

== History ==
As an Olympic Bronze medalist and Tour de France stage winner, Phinney has the most victories of any cyclist in American history. From the late 1970s until his retirement from professional cycling in 1993, Phinney achieved 328 victories. Phinney is one of only three Americans who have won multiple stages of the Tour de France. Greg LeMond and Lance Armstrong are the others.

In 2000, Phinney was 40 when he was diagnosed with young-onset Parkinson's disease after years of feeling "off". Shortly after his Parkinson's diagnosis, Davis and his family moved to Italy. While living there, Phinney was contacted by Kathleen Krumme, a cyclist who asked Phinney to let her use his name in conjunction with her ride (the Sunflower Revolution) to benefit Parkinson's. From this connection, the Davis Phinney Foundation was born.

Phinney realized there were many ways he could improve the quality of his daily life with Parkinson's, including through exercise. He started the Davis Phinney Foundation as a way to fund and advance research that demonstrates the benefits of exercise, speech therapy, and other behavioral elements that are critical to quality of life with Parkinson's. It has since expanded to include a variety of programming that helps people with Parkinson's take a more active role in their own care.

== Research ==
The Davis Phinney Foundation funds research that explores a range of factors that affect quality of life. Its primary interest is in funding research related to exercise; however, it has also funded research in depression, telemedicine, deep brain stimulation and speech. The tendency is to fund smaller, innovative studies that lead to proof of concept and greater funding from larger institutions, such as the National Institute of Health and the Michael J. Fox Foundation.

== Fundraising activities ==
The Foundation's grassroots fundraising initiative raises funds and awareness for Parkinson's disease. Team DPF members turn all types of events and activities, from bike rides and runs, to mountain climbs, to sales of original works of art into fundraisers benefiting the Foundation. The Davis Phinney Foundation also has a Pay It Forward initiative tied to The Victory Summit symposia, wherein attendees of the free events are asked to donate in order to fund future events. Fully 81% of the Foundation's revenue is devoted to funding program services.
