= Eagle River (Colorado) =

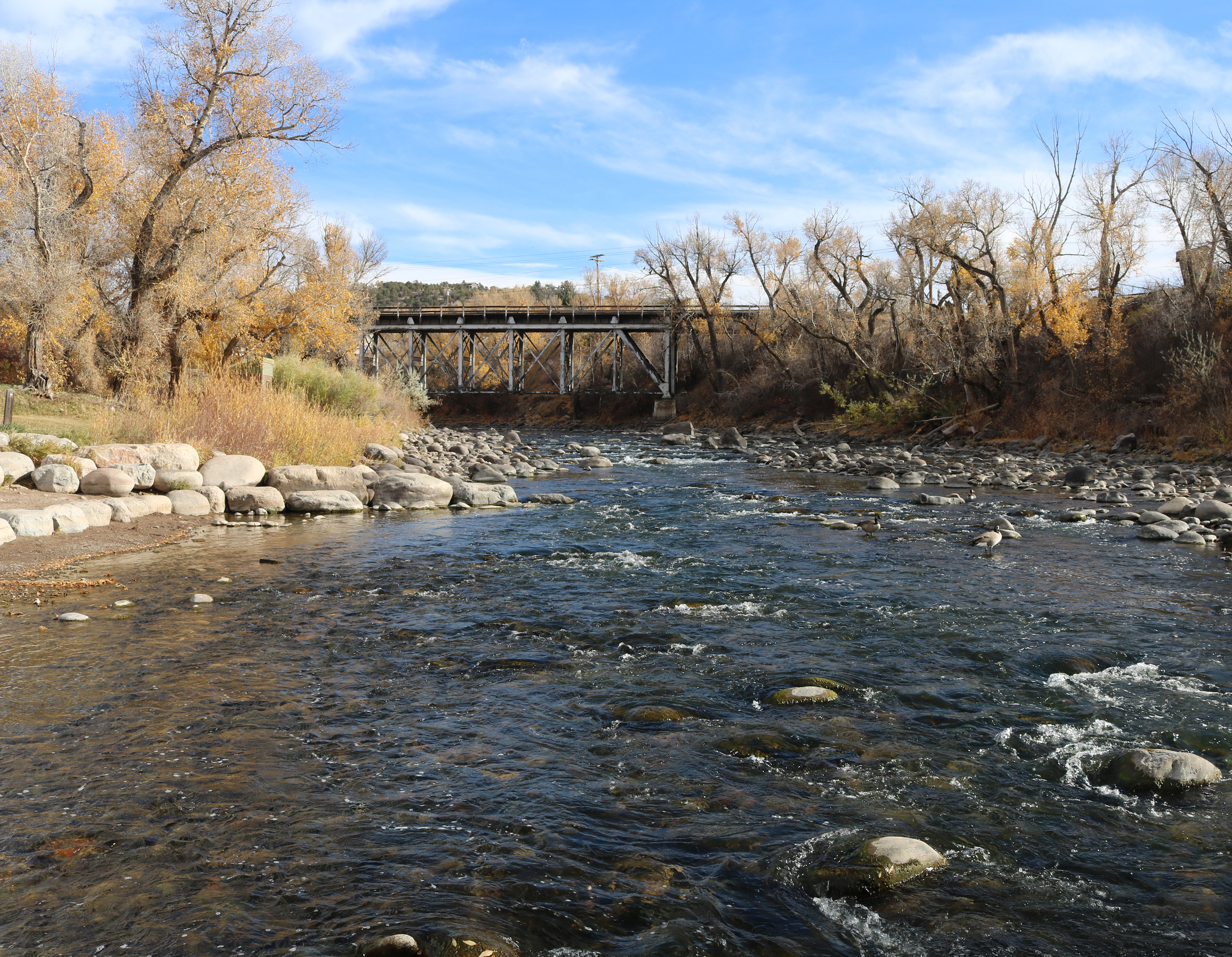
- The river at Eagle's Chambers Park

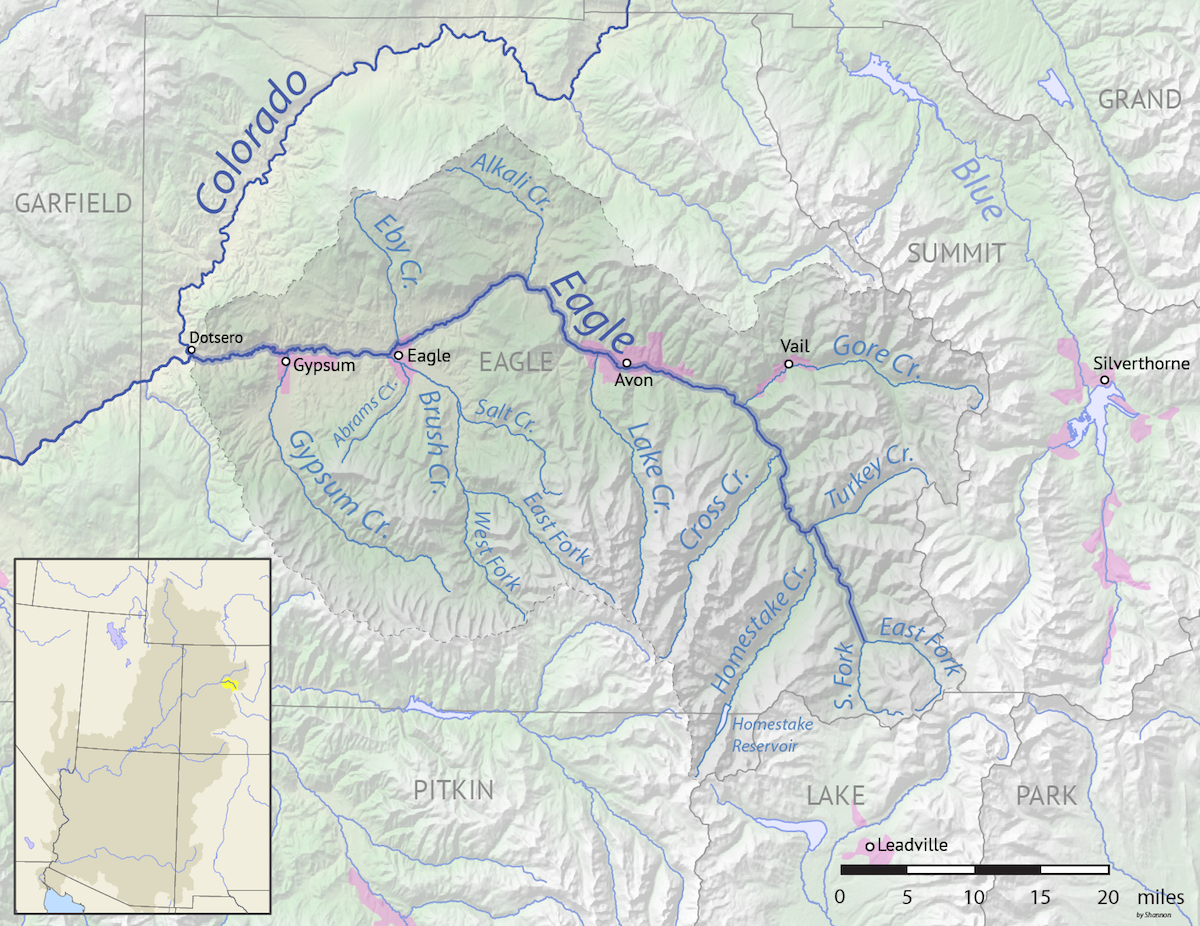
- Eagle River drainage basin

Physical characteristics
- Source
  - location: Confluence of East Fork and South Fork
  - coordinates: 39°25′18″N 107°03′26″W
- Mouth
  - location: Confluence with Colorado River
  - coordinates: 39°38′47″N 107°03′26″W
  - elevation: 6,122 ft (1,866 m)
- Length: 60.5 mi (97.4 km)
- Basin size: 945 mi^{2} (2,450 km^{2})
- Discharge
  - average: 577 cu ft/s (16.3 m^{3}/s)

Basin features
- Progression: Colorado

The Eagle River is a tributary of the Colorado River, approximately 60.5 miles (97.4 km) long, in west central Colorado in the United States.

It rises in southeastern Eagle County, at the continental divide, and flows northwest past Gilman, Minturn, Avon. Near Wolcott, it turns west, flowing past Eagle and Gypsum, and joins the Colorado at Dotsero, in western Eagle County.

Its flow ranges from 200 cu ft/s (5.7 m^{3}/s) in late summer of dry years to 7,000 cu ft/s (200 m^{3}/s) during spring runoff.

Acid mine drainage from the abandoned Eagle Mine has entered the river.

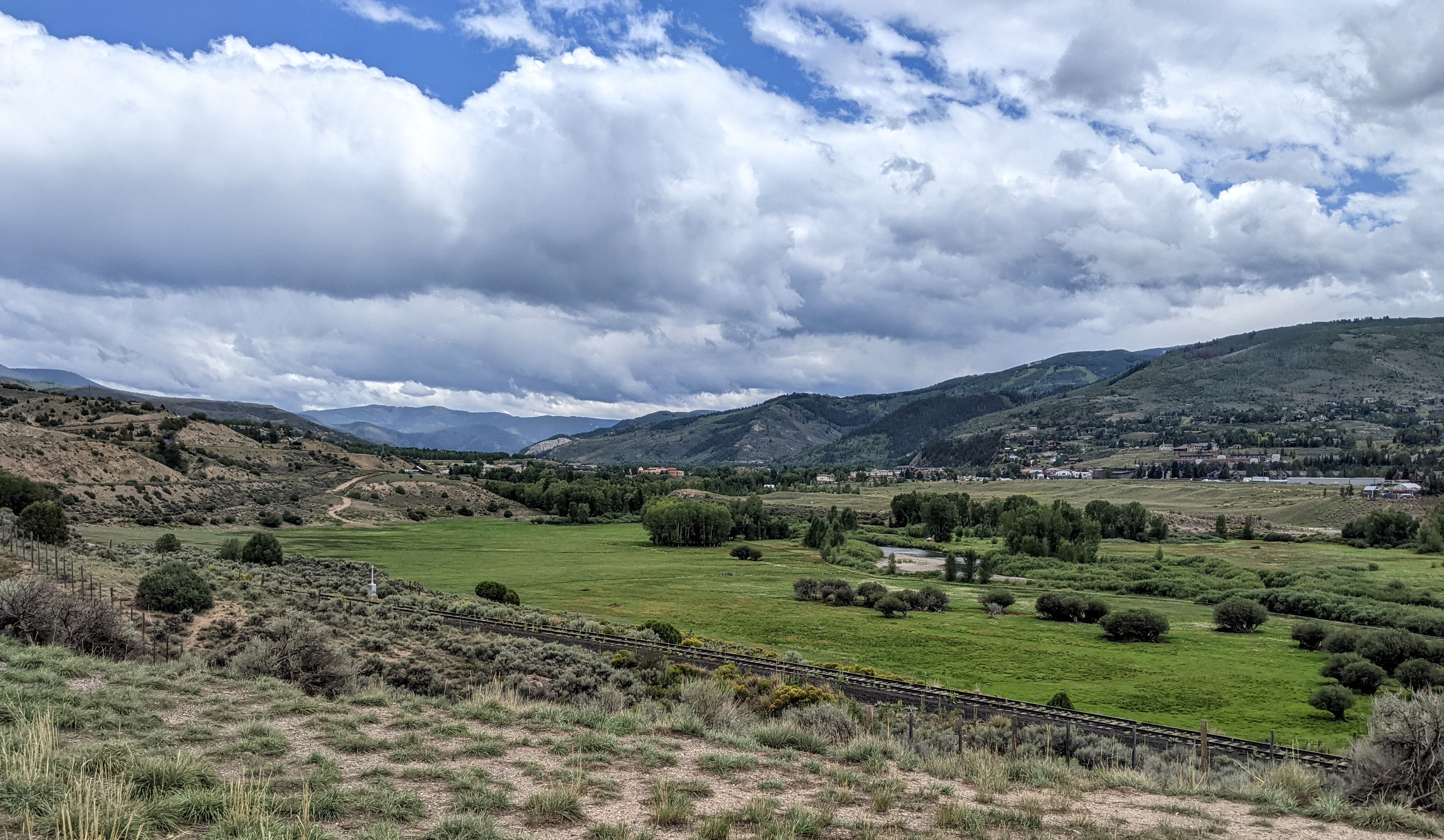
The Eagle River valley from I-70, showing Edwards, Colorado

== See also ==
- List of rivers of Colorado
- List of tributaries of the Colorado River
