= Vail, Colorado =

Town in Colorado, United States

Vail
- Home rule town
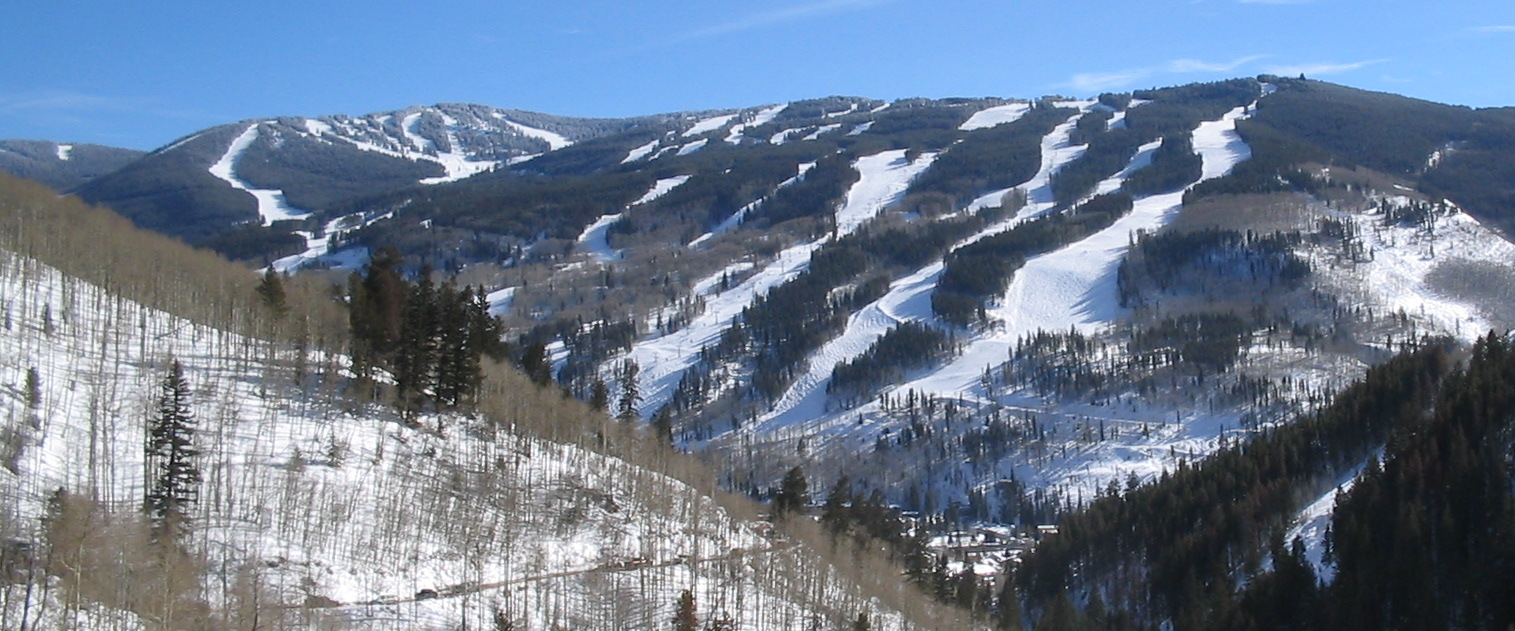
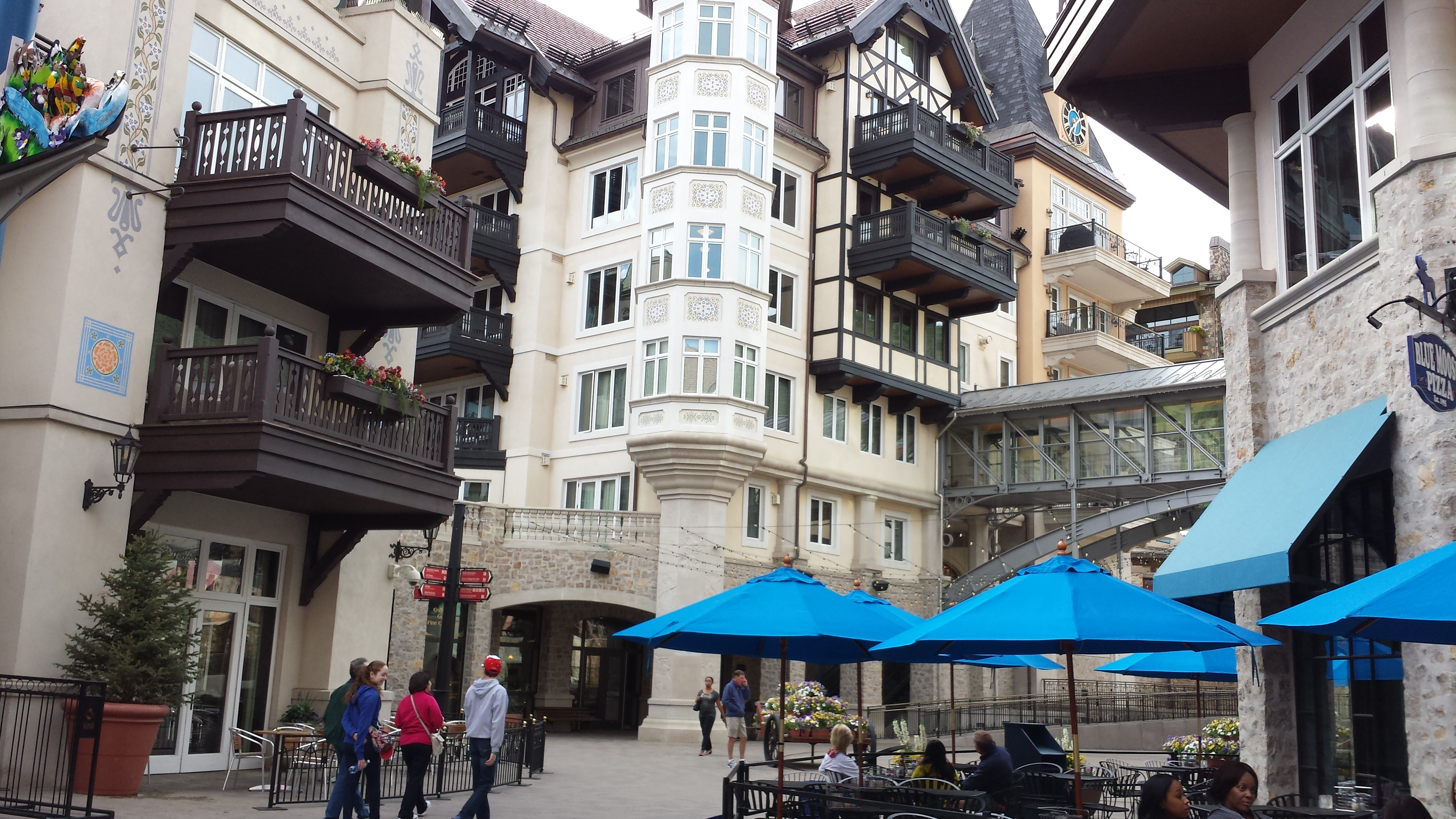
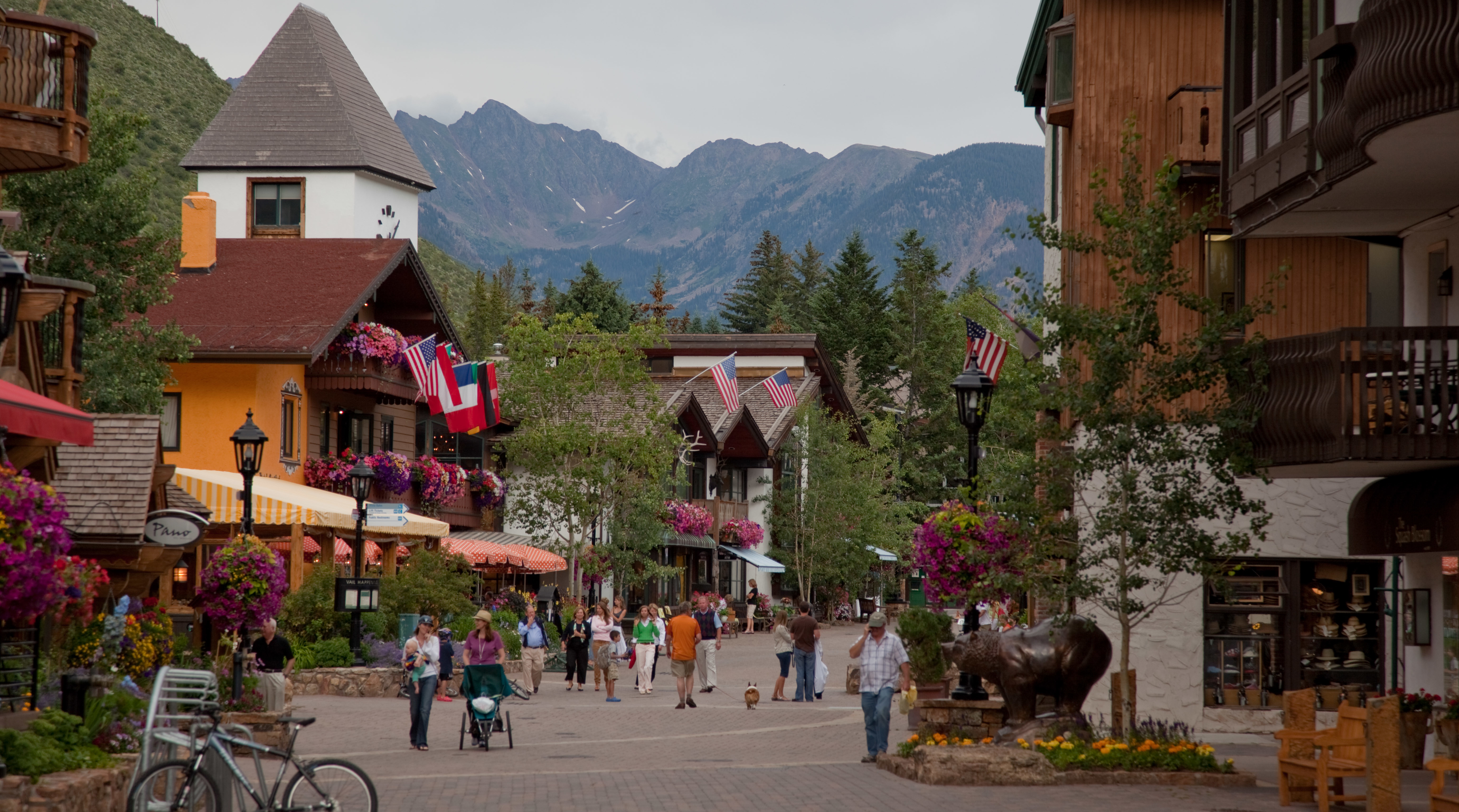
- Top to bottom: Vail Ski Resort, Lionshead district, Vail village

- Flag Logo

- Location of Vail in Eagle County, Colorado
- Coordinates: 39°38′18″N 106°21′40″W
- Country: United States
- State: Colorado
- County: Eagle
- Incorporated: August 23, 1966

Government
  - Type: Home rule municipality
  - Mayor: Barry Davis
  - Town Manager: Russell Forrest
  - Town Clerk: Stephanie Bibbens

Area
  - Total: 4.72 sq mi (12.23 km^{2})
  - Land: 4.71 sq mi (12.19 km^{2})
  - Water: 0.015 sq mi (0.04 km^{2})
- Elevation: 8,239 ft (2,511 m)

Population (2020)
  - Total: 4,835
  - Density: 1,027/sq mi (396.6/km^{2})
- Time zone: UTC−7 (MST)
  - Summer (DST): UTC−6 (MDT)
- ZIP code: 81657
- Area code: 970
- FIPS code: 08-80040
- GNIS feature ID: 2413415
- Website: Town of Vail

Vail is a home rule municipality in Eagle County, Colorado, United States. The population of the town was 4,835 in 2020. Home to Vail Ski Resort, the largest ski mountain in Colorado, the town is known for its hotels, dining, and for the numerous events the city hosts annually, such as the Vail Film Festival, Vail Resorts Snow Days, and Bravo! Vail.

== History ==
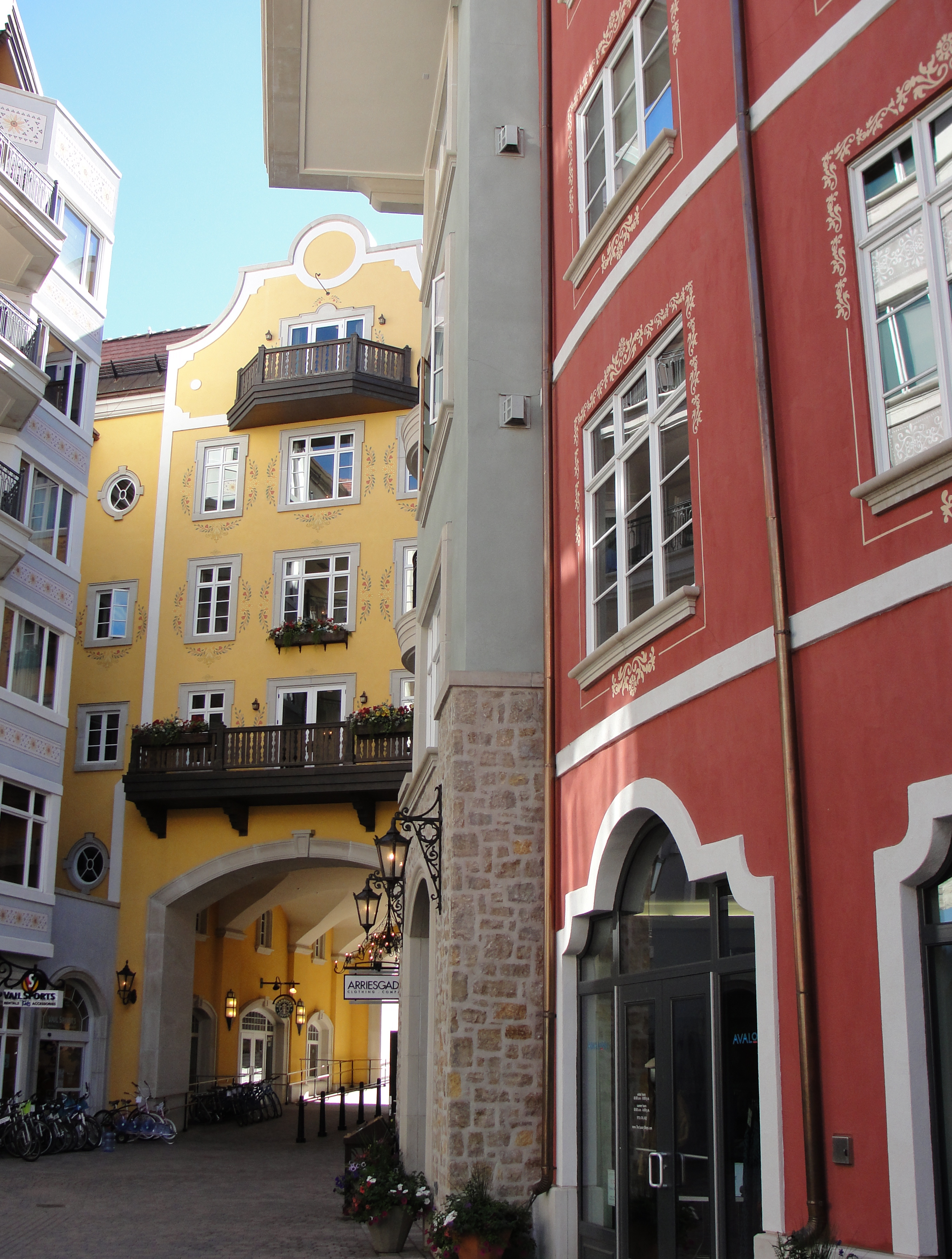
The Lionshead district of Vail

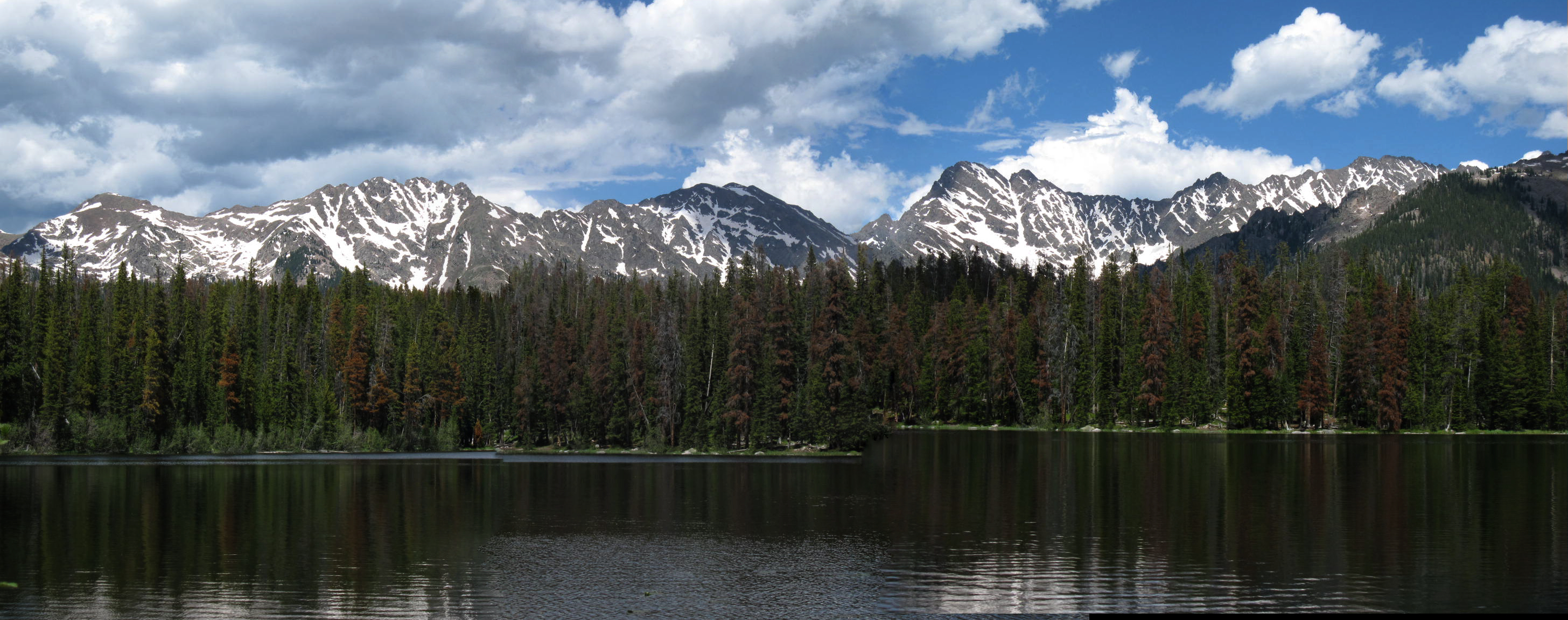
Lost Lake north of Vail

Vail was incorporated in 1966, four years after the opening of Vail Ski Resort. The ski area was founded by Pete Seibert and local rancher Earl Eaton in 1962, at the base of Vail Pass. The pass was named after Charles Vail, the highway engineer who routed U.S. Highway 6 through the Eagle Valley in 1940, which eventually became Interstate 70. Seibert, a New England native, served in the U.S. Army's 10th Mountain Division during World War II, which trained at Camp Hale, 14 miles south of Vail between Red Cliff and Leadville. He was wounded in Italy at the Battle of Riva Ridge but went on to become a professional skier after he recovered.

Seibert, with other former members of the 10th Mountain Division, returned to Colorado after World War II with the intention of opening a ski resort. During training for ski troopers at Camp Hale, he bivouacked on Vail Mountain and identified it as an ideal ski mountain. In the early 1960s, Seibert got funds from a group of Colorado investors, including Jack Tweedy, and with Earl Eaton bought a ranch at the base of the mountain and eventually incorporated as Vail Associates. As plans continued for a new ski resort, Seibert hired Morrie Shepard as Vail's first ski school director. Shortly after, Shepard recruited Rod Slifer from Aspen to be the assistant ski school director. Slifer also became the only real estate broker in the early years of Vail and would later be the broker in the transaction that allowed Vail to buy a ranch, now known as the world-famous Beaver Creek.

In December 1962, Vail officially opened for its first season. It operated a gondola lift and two ski lifts on the mountain owned by the United States Forest Service. The village was established at the base of the mountain for local residents and offered lodging for visitors. It quickly grew throughout the valley, with housing added first in East Vail and then West Vail, and additional lodging added in Lionshead in the late 1960s.

Within the first year, the village had a ski shop operated by Dick Hauserman and Joe Langmaid, a ski boutique operated by Blanche Hauserman and Bunny Langmaid, a hotel and restaurant operated by Pepi Gramshammer, and the mountain had a manager. By 1969, Vail was the most popular ski resort in the state. In 1988 Vail opened China Bowl, making Vail the third largest ski area in North America.

In 2023, the village paid $17 million to Vail Resorts to prevent Vail Resorts from building housing for 165 workers. This was preceded by a lengthy conflict where the village sought to block the construction of housing.

== Geography ==
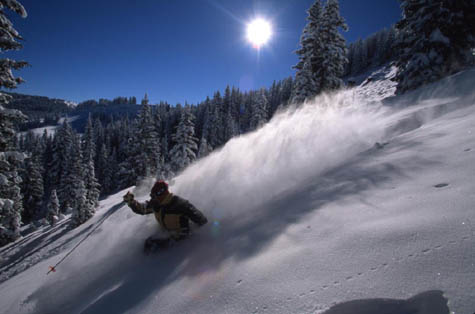
Blue Sky Basin in Vail Ski Resort

Vail's average elevation is 8,150 feet (2,480 m) above sea level. The town has a total area of 4.5 square miles (12 km^{2}), with no lakes (there is, however, at least one pond). Gore Creek flows from east to west through the center of town.

The town is surrounded by the White River National Forest and the Vail Ski Resort is leased from the United States Forest Service. Mount of the Holy Cross is visible from Vail Mountain.

=== Vail Mountain ===
Vail Mountain rises from 8,120 feet (2,470 m) to 11,570 feet (3,530 m), giving a vertical rise of 3,450 feet (1,050 m). It has a 5,289-acre (2,140 ha) skiable area, 33 ski lifts, 193 marked skiing trails on three faces: the front side, the back bowls, and Blue Sky Basin. The seven back bowls are Sun Down Bowl, Sun Up Bowl, Teacup Bowl, China Bowl, Siberia Bowl, Inner Mongolia Bowl, and Outer Mongolia Bowl. Blue Sky Basin includes Pete's Bowl and Earl's Bowl—to commemorate Pete Seibert and Earl Eaton. The mountain resort also includes 17 miles of recreation paths, botanical gardens, and an outdoor amphitheater.

=== Climate ===
Vail has warm summers and cold winters because of its elevation. Depending on the classification used, it is either an alpine or subarctic climate transitional with humid continental due to the mild daytime temperatures in September bringing the daily mean to around 50 °F (10 °C). Minimum temperatures mostly remain below the freezing point from late September to late May. The town receives an average of 200 inches (5.1 m) of snowfall per season, with even more in the surrounding mountains. Roads may close occasionally during heavy snowfall. Summer temperatures can reach the 80s, but are more often in the mid to high 70s. Combined with mountain breezes, this makes summers refreshing and cool. For being a borderline subarctic climate, daytime temperatures are very mild, indicating high diurnal temperature variation due to the altitude.

Climate data for Vail, Colorado, 1991–2020 normals, extremes 1985–present
Month	Jan	Feb	Mar	Apr	May	Jun	Jul	Aug	Sep	Oct	Nov	Dec	Year
Record high °F (°C)	51 (11)	55 (13)	72 (22)	74 (23)	82 (28)	91 (33)	95 (35)	92 (33)	86 (30)	78 (26)	66 (19)	51 (11)	95 (35)
Mean maximum °F (°C)	40.9 (4.9)	45.6 (7.6)	55.0 (12.8)	64.1 (17.8)	74.4 (23.6)	81.1 (27.3)	84.6 (29.2)	82.2 (27.9)	77.0 (25.0)	68.5 (20.3)	52.7 (11.5)	41.0 (5.0)	85.0 (29.4)
Mean daily maximum °F (°C)	28.5 (−1.9)	33.0 (0.6)	41.7 (5.4)	49.4 (9.7)	60.4 (15.8)	71.4 (21.9)	76.7 (24.8)	74.0 (23.3)	66.6 (19.2)	54.1 (12.3)	37.7 (3.2)	28.0 (−2.2)	51.8 (11.0)
Daily mean °F (°C)	17.5 (−8.1)	21.1 (−6.1)	29.2 (−1.6)	36.6 (2.6)	45.7 (7.6)	53.5 (11.9)	59.2 (15.1)	57.4 (14.1)	50.3 (10.2)	39.7 (4.3)	26.4 (−3.1)	17.6 (−8.0)	37.9 (3.2)
Mean daily minimum °F (°C)	6.6 (−14.1)	9.2 (−12.7)	16.7 (−8.5)	23.8 (−4.6)	31.0 (−0.6)	35.6 (2.0)	41.6 (5.3)	40.8 (4.9)	34.0 (1.1)	25.2 (−3.8)	15.1 (−9.4)	7.1 (−13.8)	23.9 (−4.5)
Mean minimum °F (°C)	−10.3 (−23.5)	−7.5 (−21.9)	−0.1 (−17.8)	10.7 (−11.8)	20.9 (−6.2)	28.3 (−2.1)	34.8 (1.6)	34.4 (1.3)	24.3 (−4.3)	10.9 (−11.7)	−2.9 (−19.4)	−9.0 (−22.8)	−12.9 (−24.9)
Record low °F (°C)	−21 (−29)	−32 (−36)	−16 (−27)	−1 (−18)	14 (−10)	20 (−7)	22 (−6)	22 (−6)	14 (−10)	−6 (−21)	−16 (−27)	−22 (−30)	−32 (−36)
Average precipitation inches (mm)	1.98 (50)	2.01 (51)	1.76 (45)	2.41 (61)	2.00 (51)	1.24 (31)	1.77 (45)	1.75 (44)	1.96 (50)	1.83 (46)	2.00 (51)	1.73 (44)	22.44 (569)
Average snowfall inches (cm)	35.3 (90)	35.7 (91)	28.2 (72)	21.2 (54)	4.8 (12)	0.6 (1.5)	0.0 (0.0)	0.0 (0.0)	0.9 (2.3)	8.6 (22)	25.9 (66)	28.0 (71)	189.2 (481.8)
Average extreme snow depth inches (cm)	33.3 (85)	38.4 (98)	34.8 (88)	20.9 (53)	6.1 (15)	0.5 (1.3)	0.0 (0.0)	0.0 (0.0)	0.6 (1.5)	4.3 (11)	12.9 (33)	22.3 (57)	38.8 (99)
Average precipitation days (≥ 0.01 in)	12.1	11.5	9.7	9.4	9.2	6.9	10.0	11.0	9.1	7.2	9.5	10.9	116.5
Average snowy days (≥ 0.1 in)	12.0	11.7	9.2	7.9	2.4	0.3	0.0	0.	0.6	3.5	8.9	10.7	67.2
Source 1: NOAA
Source 2: National Weather Service

== Demographics ==
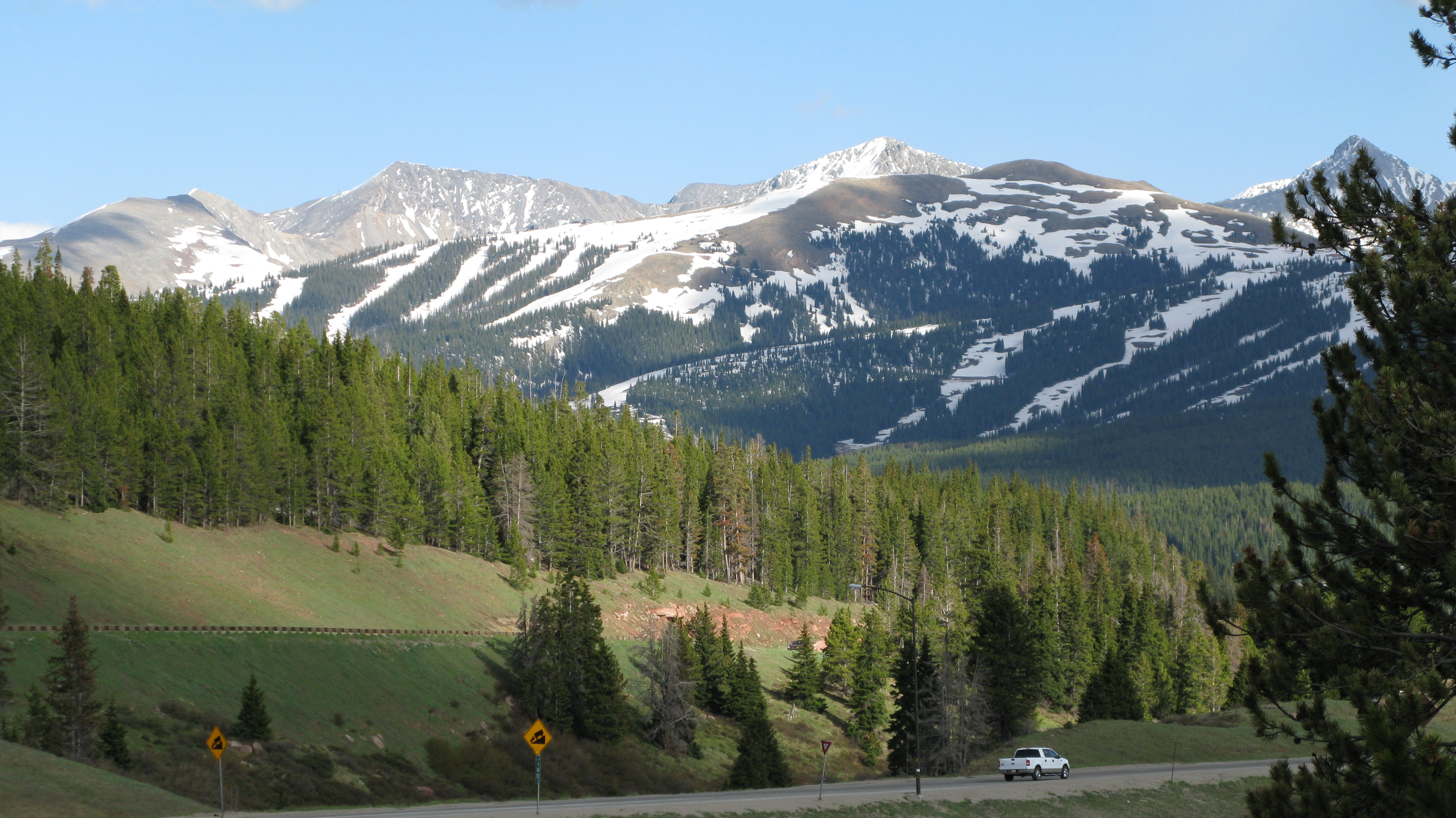
Vail Pass is one of Colorado's mountain passes located in the Rocky Mountains, and carries I-70 between Copper Mountain (pictured) and Vail.

Historical population
Census	Pop.	Note	%±
1970	484		—
1980	2,261		367.1%
1990	3,659		61.8%
2000	4,531		23.8%
2010	5,305		17.1%
2020	4,835		−8.9%
U.S. Decennial Census

=== 2020 census ===
As of the 2020 census, Vail had a population of 4,835. The median age was 38.4 years. 10.8% of residents were under the age of 18 and 16.1% of residents were 65 years of age or older. For every 100 females there were 118.8 males, and for every 100 females age 18 and over there were 120.5 males age 18 and over.

100.0% of residents lived in urban areas, while 0.0% lived in rural areas.

There were 2,388 households in Vail, of which 14.5% had children under the age of 18 living in them. Of all households, 34.3% were married-couple households, 32.7% were households with a male householder and no spouse or partner present, and 22.5% were households with a female householder and no spouse or partner present. About 36.7% of all households were made up of individuals and 9.5% had someone living alone who was 65 years of age or older. The average family size was 2.62 people.

There were 7,300 housing units, of which 67.3% were vacant. The homeowner vacancy rate was 4.1% and the rental vacancy rate was 28.3%.

Racial composition as of the 2020 census
Race	Number	Percent
White	4,174	86.3%
Black or African American	40	0.8%
American Indian and Alaska Native	20	0.4%
Asian	87	1.8%
Native Hawaiian and Other Pacific Islander	1	0.0%
Some other race	146	3.0%
Two or more races	367	7.6%
Hispanic or Latino (of any race)	500	10.3%

=== Income and education ===
The median household income was $100,417, and the median family income was $127,336. 6.0% of the population were in poverty. The average rent was $1,514, and the homeownership rate was 75%.

7% of the population had a high school or equivalent education, 19.2% had some college but no degree, 6.5% had an associate's degree, 41.5% had a bachelor's degree, and 25.1% had a graduate or professional degree.

== Economy ==
The Vail economy relies heavily on tourism. The main attraction in Vail is winter sports such as skiing and snowboarding on the mountain, in addition to snowmobiling and snowshoeing, among many other winter sports. Vail is also a summer resort and golfing center. Summer activities include guided hikes, mountain biking, horseback riding, carriage rides and fishing. Vail is also developing as a cultural center, with various art and music venues active throughout the summer. The town has a developed culinary center, with a variety of restaurants.

The median house price is over $1 million in Vail, making it one of Colorado's most expensive housing markets. The town faces a worker shortage, as there is insufficient housing. A Vail Resorts spokesperson said in 2022 that there is a deficit of some 6,000 beds for the county's work force. Vail residents have opposed proposals to increase housing supply in the town.

== Culture ==
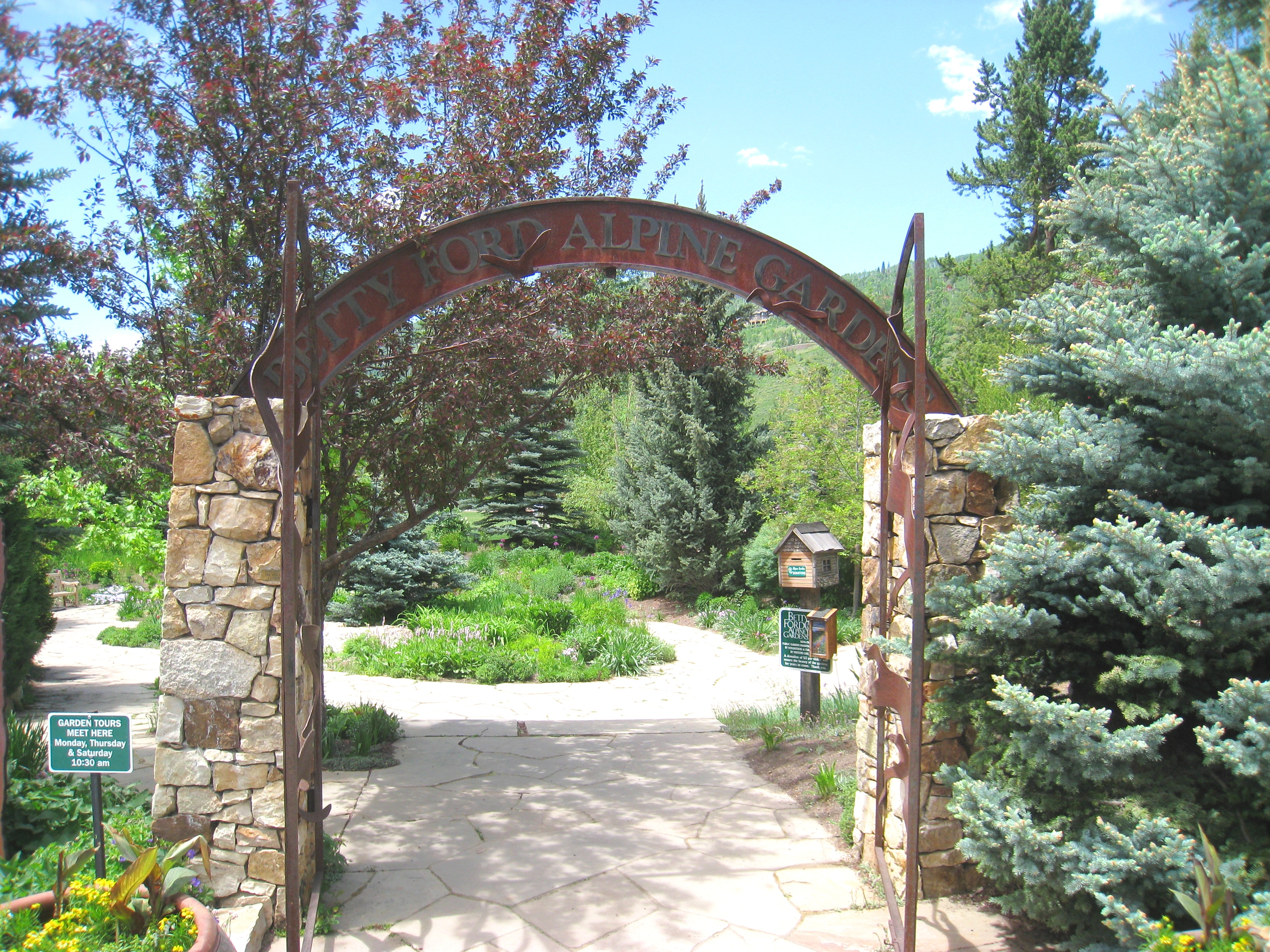
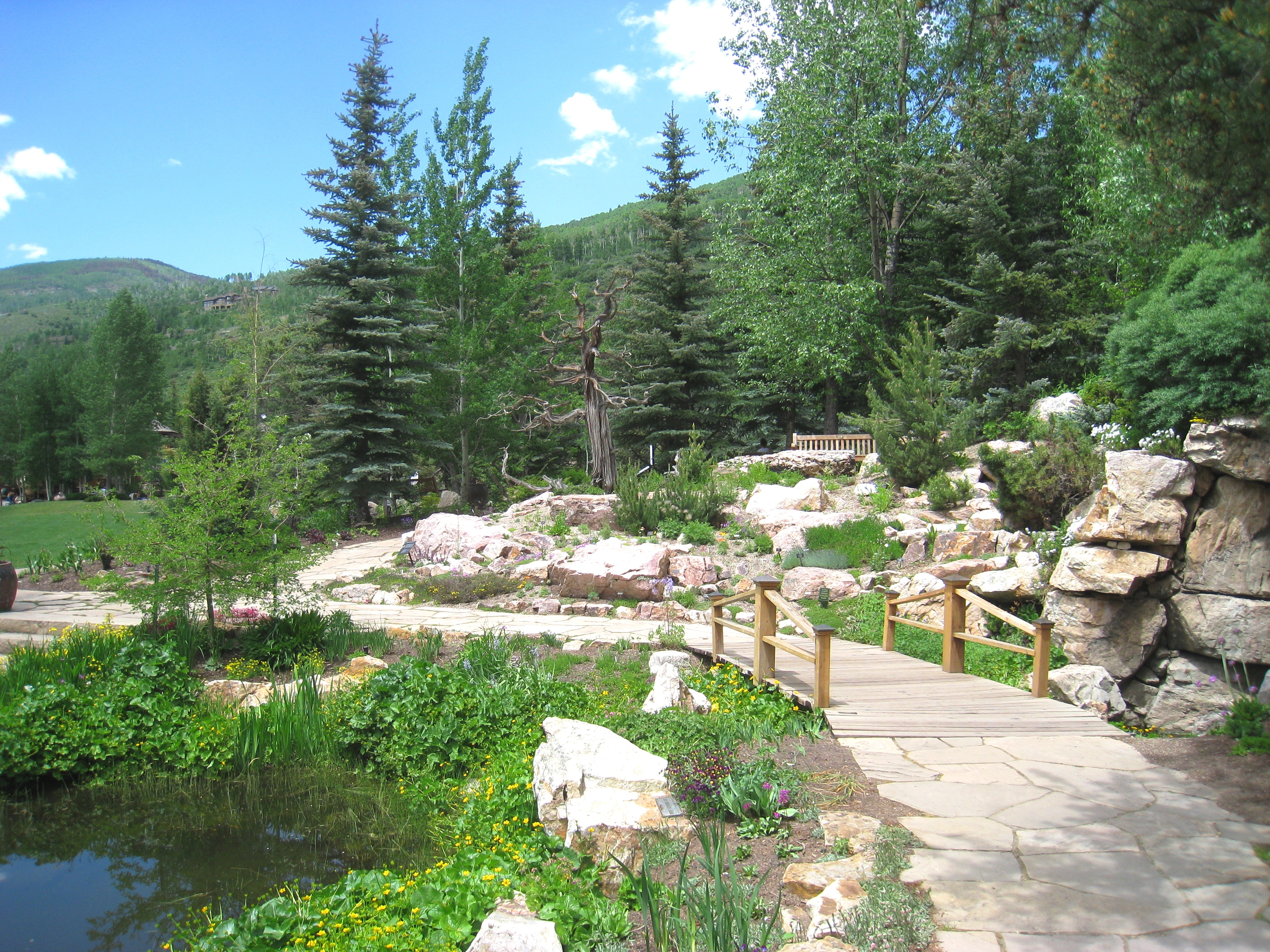
The Betty Ford Alpine Gardens are the world's highest botanical gardens.

=== Notable events ===
- Bravo! Vail – featuring the New York Philharmonic Orchestra, The Philadelphia Orchestra, and the Dallas Symphony Orchestra
- Vail Film Festival – in March or early April
- Vail International Dance Festival – summer dance festival featuring major ballet and contemporary dance companies. Notable companies include the New York City Ballet, the Paul Taylor Dance Company, and the San Francisco Ballet.
- Vail Lacrosse Shootout – Late June-Early July Ford Park.
- Vail Summer Bluegrass Series – Free, 4-week long bluegrass concert series in Lionshead Village; end of June – July
- Taste of Vail, First week of April: The iconic food and wine event of Vail
- Burton US Open Snowboarding Championships
- Vail Resorts Snow Days

=== Museums and institutions ===
- Betty Ford Alpine Gardens
- Colorado Ski Museum
- The Steadman Clinic & Steadman Philippon Research Institute – sports medicine clinic and research center for orthopedic injuries
- Vail Health Hospital
- Vail Ski Resort
- Vail Nature Center

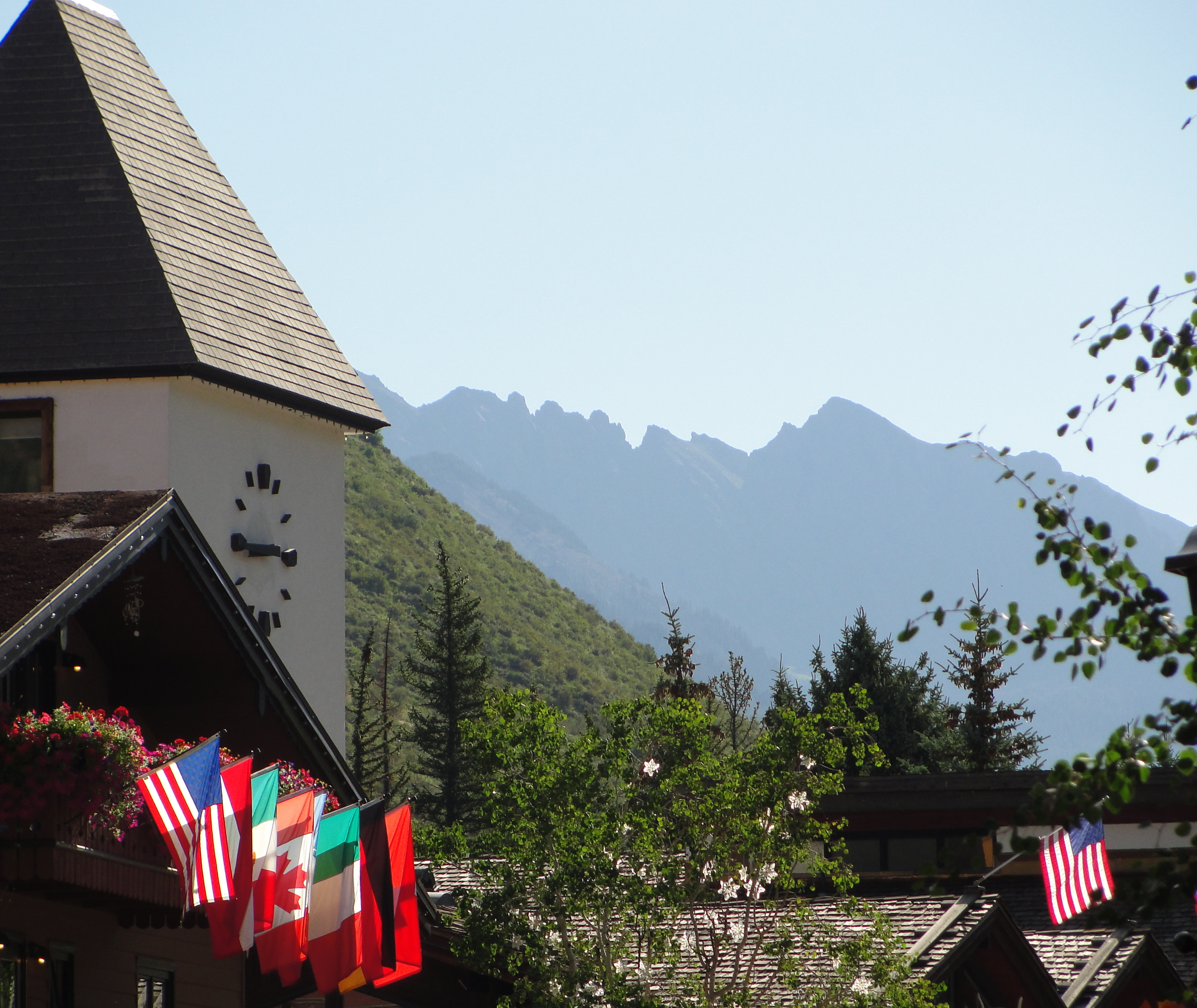
Downtown Vail village

== Government ==
Charles "Ted" Kindel was the first mayor of Vail, elected when it became a town on August 3, 1966.

Vail has a council-manager form of government and is led by a seven-member town council elected at-large. The current mayor is Barry Davis.

=== Flag ===
The flag of Vail is flown by government buildings and businesses in Vail. It is composed of three stripes which are light blue, white, and dark green, which represent the blue Colorado sky, white powder snow, and the surrounding Evergreen forest, respectively. Centered on the flag is the original Vail element, which consists of two "V"s, the upper to represent the surrounding mountains, while the lower represents the Vail Valley. A gold wreath surrounds the element to represent excellence and achievement.

== Education ==
Vail's public schools are part of Eagle County School District RE-50, with high school students attending the nearby Battle Mountain High School in Edwards. Eagle County Schools also offers the Vail Ski & Snowboard Academy, a joint program with area ski programs for students in grades 5–12 who are involved in competitive skiing and snowboarding. Private schools in the Vail area include Vail Mountain School (K-12), Vail Christian High School (9–12), St. Clare of Assisi Catholic School (K-8), and the Vail Academy (PK-8).

Higher education is available at the Vail Valley campus of Colorado Mountain College, located in Edwards.

== Media ==
The Vail Daily newspaper is published by Swift Communications.

A broadcast translator for public radio station KUNC allows listeners in the Eagle Valley to listen at 99.7 FM.

Two specialty television networks have stations in Vail, Plum TV and Resort Sports Network. The latter, branded as TV-8, also broadcasts on the low-powered UHF station K34QB-D. The Ski Channel is available only on DirecTV on Channel 1860.

During the mid-1970s, Vail became known as the Western White House of President Gerald Ford, when he conducted much of the nation's business from The Lodge at Vail hotel. The national media followed Ford to Vail and often broadcast television pictures of Vail's mountain slopes.

== Transportation ==
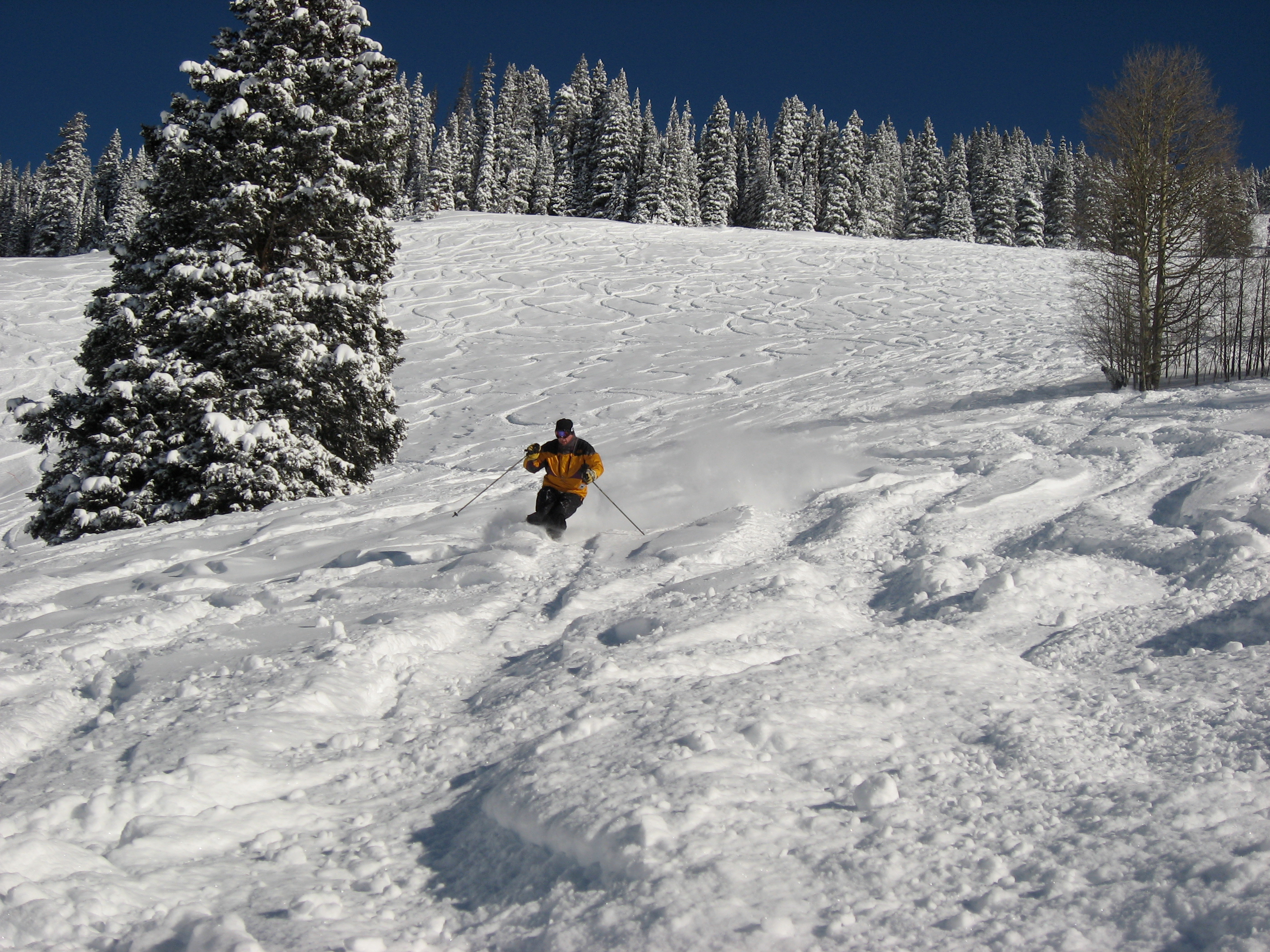
Skiing at Vail Ski Resort

Vail is served by Eagle County Airport near Gypsum, 30 miles (48 km) to the west. Native Americans used to call the area near the airport the "hole in the sky" because storms seemed to avoid it. Vail is modeled on European ski towns, many of which are car-free, and the town is partially pedestrianized. The town operates the largest free shuttle bus system in the United States and has ten hybrid-electric buses. At each bus stop, a sign reports when the next two buses will arrive.

The In-Town Shuttle provides service every five minutes during peak winter times, and every 15 minutes off-peak, between Golden Peak, Vail Village, the business district, and Lionshead, with live schedule information provided at bus stops by Global Positioning System technology, which tracks buses. Other routes centering on the Transportation Center service the East and West Vail districts on a scheduled, but less frequent basis.

Eagle County provides bus service from the Transportation Center with service to Vail, Leadville, Minturn, Eagle-Vail, Avon, Beaver Creek, Edwards, Eagle, Gypsum and Dotsero.

The Colorado Department of Transportation, through its Bustang program, provides intercity transportation to Vail along its West Line. The West Line goes from Denver to Grand Junction and back.

=== Highways ===
Interstate 70 runs east–west through the middle of Vail and is the only road to or from Vail, with exits at East Vail, at the base of Vail Pass, the town of Vail, and West Vail. From the east, the highway comes from Denver, 97 miles (156 km) away, passes through Eisenhower Tunnel and over the Continental Divide, by-passing Loveland Pass, and over Vail Pass, dropping down into Vail Valley. To the west, it meets U.S. Highway 24 at Dowd Junction, passes through Avon, Edwards, Colorado, and Eagle, through Glenwood Canyon traveling and on to Grand Junction, and reaches Utah, where it ends at the intersection with Interstate 15.

In West Vail, U.S. Route 6 (which still exists as a service road between East Vail, Vail, and West Vail) merges with I-70 at Dowd Junction. I-70 roughly follows the original Highway 6 route until the two highways diverge again in Silverthorne, 31 miles (50 km) to the east.

== Notable people ==
- Rob Eaton, musician
- James Hetfield, musician
- Buddy Lazier, auto racing driver
- Flinn Lazier, auto racing driver and skier
- Tracee Metcalfe, alpinist and physician
- Seth Morrison, skier
- Mikaela Shiffrin, Olympic skier
- Katie Uhlaender, Olympic skeleton racer
- Nicole Gee, US Marine Corps Sergent

== Sister city ==
Vail has a sister city, as designated by Sister Cities International:

- St. Moritz, Grisons, Switzerland

== See also ==
- Vail Lacrosse Shootout
- Vail Pass
- Vail Ski Resort
