= Ski Cooper =

Alpine ski resort in Colorado, United States

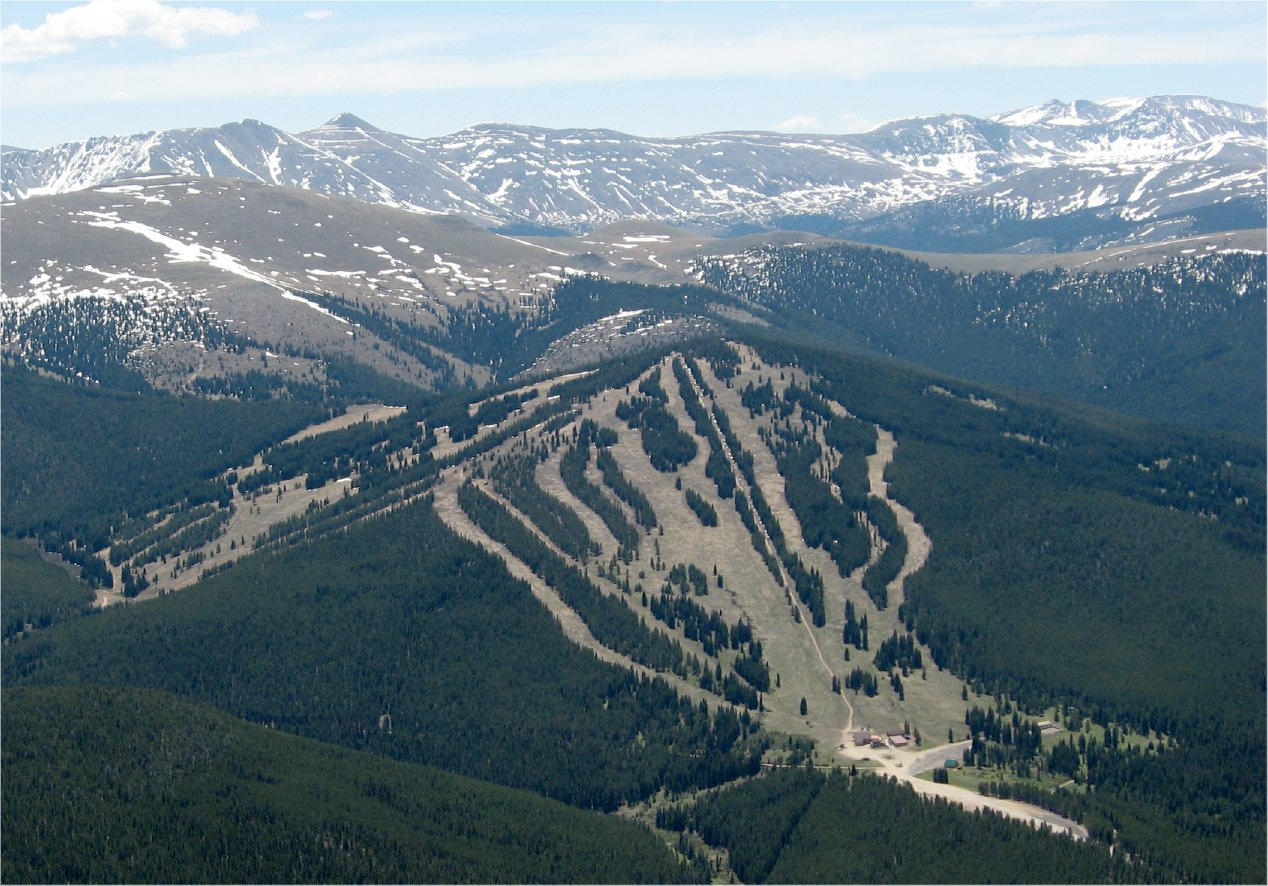
- Ski Cooper Looking SE in 2009

- Location in Colorado Ski Cooper (the United States)
- Location: Eagle / Lake counties, Colorado, USA
- Nearest city: Leadville, Colorado
- Coordinates: 39.360°N 106.302°W
- Owner: Lake County
- Vertical: 1,200 feet (366 m)
- Top elevation: 11,700 feet (3,566 m)
- Base elevation: 10,500 feet (3,200 m)
- Skiable area: 470 acres (1.9 km^{2}) lift served 2,400 acres (9.7 km^{2}) snowcat served
- Trails: 60 total: 31% beginner; 35% intermediate; 34% advanced/expert
- Longest run: Trails End 1.4 miles (2.3 km)
- Lift system: 1 Triple, 1 Double, 3 Surface
- Snowfall: 250 inches (640 cm)
- Snowmaking: None
- Website: skicooper.com

Ski Cooper is an alpine ski resort in Colorado, one of the oldest in the state. Opened as Cooper Hill Ski Area in 1942, the ski area served as the training site for the 10th Mountain Division, based at nearby Camp Hale during World War II.

The resort is owned by Lake County and managed by Cooper Hill Ski Area, a 501(c)4 nonprofit with a volunteer board. Dan Torsell has served as the general manager since 2012.

== Location ==
Ski Cooper is located at Tennessee Pass, at the dividing line between the San Isabel National Forest and the White River National Forest, near Leadville.

== Description ==
Ski Cooper markets itself as a family resort because of its affordability and accessibility. It is among the most affordable ski areas in the state, second to only Howelsen Hill in Steamboat Springs.

The resort has 64 runs of varying difficulty serviced by two chairlifts (one Hall/CTEC double and one Poma triple), one Doppelmayr platter lift, one Leitner t-bar, and one Magic Carpet conveyor lift. It has ample beginner and intermediate terrain, along with tree and glade skiing, ungroomed and mogul terrain, all with exclusively natural snow. Dining options at the resort include a cafeteria, an Irish pub, a Taproom, and a restaurant in a mountaintop yurt. Equipment rental and a retail store are also available on the property.

Ski Cooper is home to the Chicago Ridge Snowcat Tours which provides access to backcountry glades and powder bowls. The resort has an active alpine race department, and has also been known to host Ski & Snowboard Cross NorAm level races.

== History ==
The Cooper Hill Ski Area, as it was then known, was founded in 1942. That year, the US Army selected the area to serve as the 10th Mountain Division training site because of its proximity to the Pando rail station. Ski Cooper opened to the public as a ski resort in the postwar period and continues to host a Memorial Day celebration for the World War II veterans of the 10th Mountain Division.

In January 2020, the resort expanded with the opening of the Tennessee Creek Basin Area.
