= Dale Maple =

United States Army soldier and Nazi collaborator

Dale H. Maple
- Born: September 10, 1920; San Diego, California, U.S.
- Died: May 28, 2001 (aged 80); El Cajon, California, U.S.
- Status: Deceased
- Convictions: Aiding the enemy Desertion
- Penalty: Death; commuted to life imprisonment; further commuted to 10 years imprisonment

Dale H. Maple (September 10, 1920 – May 28, 2001) was a private in the United States Army in World War II who helped two German prisoners of war (POWs) escape in 1943. The POWs were recaptured, and Maple was court-martialed for aiding the enemy and sentenced to death by hanging. He was the first American soldier ever convicted of a crime equivalent to treason. However, his sentence was first commuted to life imprisonment, then to ten years. Maple was released from prison in October 1950.

== Early life and education ==
Maple was born in San Diego, California on September 10, 1920. His working-class parents were of English and Irish extraction.

Maple graduated first in his class of 585 from San Diego High School at the age of sixteen and won a scholarship to Harvard University. In 1941, he received a bachelor's degree in comparative philology magna cum laude, specializing in German, from Harvard and was a member of Phi Beta Kappa. An FBI agent later described him as "one of the most intelligent men I have ever had the opportunity to interview". However, Maple was pressured into resigning from the university German Club for singing the "Horst-Wessel-Lied" and other Nazi songs. When he told The Crimson student newspaper that "even a bad dictatorship is better than a good democracy", he was also dismissed from the campus Reserve Officers' Training Corps.

== Aiding the enemy ==
As a result of his pro-German activities, when Maple enlisted in February 1942, both the Army and the FBI kept files on him. He was assigned, along with others under suspicion, to the 620th Engineer General Service Company, one of only a handful of units which were not allowed to bear arms. On December 5, 1943, a detachment of the company was assigned to guard prisoners of war at Camp Hale in Colorado. Fraternization between guards and prisoners was noticed (and resented) by ski troopers of the 10th Mountain Division who were training there; many of the division's ski instructors were Austrian émigrés.

Maple and three others in the 620th plotted an escape. Maple purchased a 1934 REO sedan and, on February 15, 1944, picked up Afrika Korps Sergeants Heinrich Kikillus and Erhard Schwichtenberg from a work detail without attracting attention. After 36 hours of driving, they were within 17 miles (27 km) of the Mexican border when they ran out of gas. The trio walked into Mexico, where they were arrested by a Mexican customs official and turned over to American authorities.

Maple was jailed in Albuquerque, New Mexico, and originally charged with treason. The Army convened a court martial and charged Maple instead under the 81st Article of War for "relieving, corresponding with or aiding the enemy", the "closest equivalent to the charge of treason", as well as desertion. He pleaded not guilty. Maple's defense was that the plot was a ruse which had only been intended to draw attention to the existence of U.S. Army "Special Organizations" which had been established in World War II. These units held soldiers suspected of being disloyal to the United States. Maple was found guilty and sentenced to death by hanging. On June 22, 1944, an Army review board confirmed Maple's conviction and sentence. However, Army Judge Advocate General Myron C. Cramer recommended to President Franklin D. Roosevelt that his life be spared so he could live to see Nazi Germany lose the war.

"I feel that the ends of justice will better be served by sparing his life so that he may live to see the destruction of tyranny, the triumph of the ideals against which he sought to align himself, and the final victory of the freedom he so grossly abused."

On November 18, 1944, Roosevelt commuted Maple's sentence to life in prison plus a dishonorable discharge. In 1946, Maple's sentence was further reduced to ten years. He was released from prison on October 8, 1950. Maple's three accomplices, Theophil Leonhard, Paul Kissman, and Friedrich Siering, all of whom had connections to Germany, were also court-martialed for their roles in the escape. Leonhard and Kissman were both sentenced to life in prison, while Siering received a 10-year sentence due to his lesser role. All three men received dishonorable discharges. They were released from prison around the same time as Maple. The charges against another soldier, Eric Hotelling, were dropped.

== Later life ==
After his release, Maple worked for San Diego's National Steel & Shipbuilding Company. In 1964, he joined the American National General Agencies as an insurance manager. In 1978, he retired as a vice president of the company. Maple died in El Cajon, California on May 28, 2001.
