= Vail Lacrosse Shootout =

The Vail Lacrosse Shootout is a lacrosse tournament held annually in Vail, Colorado, composed of eight age brackets for men- Chumash (Youth), High School (U-19), Elite (19+), Masters (30+), Supermasters (40+), Grandmasters (50+), Zenmasters (60+) and Pastmasters (70+), and three for women- Chumash, High School and Elite. Play typically runs from the end of June into the beginning of July. Games take place in Vail, Avon and Edwards, however most games are in Vail at Ford Field, Donovan Park and Athletic Field, as well as Vail Mountain School.

The inaugural tournament was held in 1973 and the event has become increasingly larger and more popular since. Participating teams come from all over the nation and world, and are made up of both local and college alumni teams. Players come from all levels of high school and collegiate play, from Division I, II and III.

Champions prior to 2002 cannot be found on the Vail Lacrosse website and thus are not included in the tables below. If such information is known then please feel free to add it, however please include the appropriate citations.

== High School Boys ==
=== 2008 Participants ===
Division I – Baltimore Crabs, Team Colorado, Colorado Favorites, Team Delaware, Team Indiana, Team Ohio, Triad Lacrosse Club and Team Utah.

Division II – Kansas City, Kansas City Blue Lions, Midwest Elite, Team Nebraska, Sacramento, Sacramento Elite and Winnipeg Wolverines.

=== Division I Finals History ===
Year	Champion	Score	Defeated
2000	Ohio	12–5	Colorado
2001	Ohio		
2002	Ohio	11–7	Colorado
2003	Colorado	13–7	Ohio
2004	New England	14–11	Baltimore
2005	Colorado	13–12	Baltimore Crabs
2006	Baltimore Crabs	11–10	Colorado
2007	Baltimore Crabs	11–6	Arizona
2008	Baltimore Crabs	13–6	Colorado Favorites
2009	Baltimore Crabs	12–6	Team Colorado
2010	Baltimore Crabs	12 – 11 OT	Fellowship of Christian Athletes

=== Division II Finals History ===
Year	Champion	Score	Defeated
2001	Southeast		
2002	Southeast	10–8	Calgary
2003	Edmonton	13–10	Calgary
2004	RC Lax	11–9	Southeast
2005	Bethesda	14 – 13 OT	Long Island
2006	Chowdaheads	18–12	Utah
2007	Indiana	14–4	Midwest Elite
2008	Winnipeg Wolverines	13–12	Kansas City Blue Lions
2009	Toronto	12–7	Winnipeg Wolverines
2010	Huskers	13–8	Blue Lion Elite

== Men's Elite ==
=== 2008 Participants ===
Team 21, 5280/Tap Room, AIG-Livestrong, Arizona Mermen, Team Black Seal, Brine Elite, Club All-Stars, Footclan, Generals, Team Gutman, LaxGrip, The Lofers, Merrill Lynch/Lacrossewear, Reebok, Team Rock-it Pocket, Rocky Mountain Oysters, Team Rubi Rey and Team Valhalla.

=== Finals History ===
Year	Champion	Score	Defeated
2000	Lax World	13–12	Under Armour
2002	MAB Paints	14–6	NW Jammin' Salmon
2003	Harrow Colorado	12–8	GMH
2004	Mammoth	9–6	GMH
2005	GMH	13–7	Go Fast
2006	Mammoth	18–6	Go Fast
2007	Go Fast	7–6	Lax Grip
2008	Team 21	12–7	Reebok
2009	Merrill Lynch/Lacrossewear	11–8	Team 21
2010	Maverik Elite	14–7	Team Chipotle
2011	Lacrossewear	24–7	Rocky Mountain Oysters
2012	Maverik Elite	16–10	Lacrossewear
2013	The Cage Goes All Out	16 – 15 2OT	Lacrossewear
2014	Lacrossewear	12–8	The Cage Goes All Out
2015	Team Dynasty/Lacrossewear	10–8	Brine Elite
2016	Team Dynasty/Lacrossewear	20–11	Flying Dutchmen
2017	Team Rokk3r/Lacrossewear	22-4	Big Green Herd
2018	Team Rokk3r/Lacrossewear	21–7	Rocky Mountain Oysters

== Men's Masters ==
=== 2008 Participants ===
Jägermeister, Lacrossewear, Lax Gear/Silver Oysters, Team MAC, Middlebury and Tribe Elders.

=== Finals History ===
Year	Champion	Score	Defeated
2002	Rock-it Pocket	10–4	STX/Lax Unlimited
2003	Rusty Red	9–3	Rock-it Pocket
2004	Rusty Red	13–2	Long Island
2005	Rusty Red	14–5	Lax Unlimited
2006	Rusty Red	10–9	Lax Unlimited
2007	Rusty Red	12–8	Middlebury
2008	Jägermeister	8 -6	Middlebury
2009	Jägermeister	11–7	Middlebury
2010	Genesis	12-11	Jägermeister
2012	Jägermeister	12–11	Adrenaline
2013	Jägermeister	13–9	Hulu

== Men's Supermasters ==
=== 2008 Participants ===
Adidas Magic Wands, Arizona Graybirds, Blivet, Colorado Lacrosse Club, Elder Statesmen, Essian/Tap Room, FROGs, Lacrosse.com, Lacrossewear, Middlebury, Team Millennium Rock-it Pocket, Navy, NYAC Founding Fathers, Princeton Obsoletes, Tri-City Canadians and Tsunami/Olde Quakers.

=== Division I Finals History ===
Year	Champion	Score	Defeated
2002	Bowdoin Polar Bears	9–6	FROGs
2003	Tap Room/Atlantic Sportswear	8–2	CVLC
2004	CLVC/Riddell	9–6	Tombstone
2005	Tap Room/Atlantic Sportswear	11–6	Elder Statesmen
2006	Elder Statesmen	13–12	Navy Old Goats
2007	CVLC/Tsunami	12–10	Elder Statesmen
2008	Adidas Magic Wands	14–9	FROGs
2009	Millennium/Team Rock-it Pocket	12–11	Elder Statesmen
2010	Quiksilver Elder Statesmen	9–7	Millennium/Rock-it Pocket

=== Division II Finals History ===
Year	Champion	Score	Defeated
2005	Magic Wands	6–1	Middlebury

== Men's Grandmasters ==
=== 2008 Participants ===
Eldest Statesmen, Gravediggers, Los Viejos de Adidas, Middlebury, Mr. Boh/Nacho Mamas, Navy Grandgoats, Rockies and USA Stars.

=== Finals History ===
Year	Champion	Score	Defeated
2006	Los Viejos	9–4	Majestic Rockies
2007	Round Robin		No Clear Champion
2008	Mr. Boh/Nacho Mamas	13–6	Middlebury
2009	Polar Statesmen	18–4	USA Stars
2010	Quiksilver Eldest Statesmen	11–2	Los Viejos de Adidas

== High School Girls ==
=== 2008 Participants ===
Gold Division – Colorado 1, CTLF, Heros, M&D Lax, PA Express, Puget Sound, Team Texas and TLC.

Silver Division – Bay Area Wave, Team Capital, Lady Blue Knights, MFL Fusion, Minnesota Lakers, Queen City Stars, Triple Threat and Team Utah.

Bronze Division – Colorado 2, Colorado 3, Detroit, Eagle Elite, Indy Girls, Lakeshore and Midwest Elite.

=== Gold Division Finals History ===
Year	Champion	Score	Defeated
2002	Heros	11–10	Future Elite
2003	Future Elite	12–11	PA Express
2004	M&D Lax	10–9	East Coast Lax
2005	M&D Lax	10–9	Rome
2006	Heros 2007	17–5	PA Express
2007	M&D	9–3	Heros
2008	Heros	7–6	M&D Lax
2009	M&D Lax	16–4	PA Express
2010	Heros	9 – 8 2OT	Team HLA

=== Silver Division Finals History ===
Year	Champion	Score	Defeated
2004	Lady Roc	10–6	PA Express
2005	Future Elite*		Houston Heat*
2006	Ultimate	12–9	Team Denver
2007	CTLF	11–8	FLC
2008	Lady Blue Knights	12–7	Team Capital
2009	Stars Silver	12–11	Bay Area Wave Blue
2010	RC Elite Gold	11–7	Stars 2014

=== Bronze Division Finals History ===
Year	Champion	Score	Defeated
2004	Metro Magic	17–4	Team Impact
2005	Team Dixie	9–1	Team Las Vegas
2006	Detroit	8–7	NorCal Elite
2007	Minnesota	10–5	Lakeshore
2008	Lakeshore	12–9	Detroit
2009	Team Vegas	12–1	Mountain Mania
2010	Oregon	8–5	Bay Area Wave

== Women's Elite ==
=== 2008 Participants ===
Team 180, AOB, Colorado Chillax, CRSLAX, Dos Brisas Lax, Gang Green, Lax Hut, Lax World Colorado, Merrill Lynch, Minnesota Northstars, QC Lax Midwest, Revolution Lacrosse, Tap Room, Team Wild and Team Xtreme.

=== Finals History ===
Year	Champion	Score	Defeated
2002	Team Ripple	9–7	WomensLacrosse.com
2003	AXIA	16–7	Team Simeons
2004	Team Harrow	10–6	AXIA
2005	reLAXers	16–6	Team Wild
2006	reLAXers	14–10	PA Express
2007	Outlaws	18–3	Gang Green
2008	Dos Brisas	14–5	Revolution
2009	Gang Green	12 – 11 OT	CRSLax.com
2010	CRSLax.com	15–7	Colorado Tropics

== See also ==
- Lacrosse
- NCAA Men's Lacrosse Championship
- NCAA Women's Lacrosse Championship
- World Lacrosse Championship
- Women's Lacrosse World Cup
