= Pete Seibert =

American skier (1924–2002)

- Born: August 7, 1924; Sharon, Massachusetts, U.S
- Died: July 15, 2002 (aged 77); Edwards, Colorado, U.S.
- Spouse: Elizabeth (Betty)
- Children: 3
- Military career
- Allegiance: United States
- Branch: United States Army
- Commands: 10th Mountain Division
- Conflicts: World War II • Battle of Riva Ridge

Peter Werner Seibert (August 7, 1924 – July 15, 2002) was an American skier and the founder of Vail Ski Resort in Colorado. He was inducted into the Colorado Ski (and Snowboard) Hall of Fame in 1980.

== Early life and education ==
A Massachusetts native, Seibert graduated from the New Hampton School in New Hampshire and served in the 10th Mountain Division of the U.S. Army during World War II, training as an elite ski trooper at Camp Hale in Colorado. Wounded in the leg by a mortar shell blast in the Battle of Riva Ridge in Italy on 3 March 1945, he returned to the United States to begin recuperation. Like other ski soldiers who had trained at Camp Hale, Seibert returned to Colorado, where he became a ski patrolman at the Aspen Mountain. He qualified for the 1950 U.S. Ski Team, which hosted the 1950 World Championships at Aspen, although his injury prevented him from competing.

== Later career ==
In 1957, Seibert and rancher Earl Eaton climbed Vail Mountain where, as trainees from Camp Hale (Earl did not train at Camp Hale but he did help build it), they had learned winter bivouacking, and decided to build "the most beautiful ski resort in the world". They raised funds from a group of Denver investors, bought a ranch at the base of Vail mountain and, to distract competitors, called it the "Trans Montane Rod and Gun Club". The resort was built in 1962 at the base of Vail mountain, opening on December 15 with two chairlifts and one gondola; lift tickets were five dollars.

In seven years, Vail grew to become the most popular ski resort in Colorado. Seibert hoped that Vail (and the future Beaver Creek) would host the skiing portions of the 1976 Winter Olympics, which had been awarded to Denver in 1970. In early 1972, the venues for the skiing events were changed to established areas west of the continental divide, approved by the International Olympic Committee (IOC) in February. Alpine events were moved to Vail from the undeveloped Mount Sniktau (and Loveland Ski Area) east of Loveland Pass, and the Nordic events moved from Evergreen to Steamboat Springs. The original sites submitted in the 1970 bid satisfied a requirement of proximity to the Olympic Village (at the University of Denver). In November 1972, Colorado voters rejected a referendum to publicly fund the Winter Olympics, and within three months the games were transferred to Innsbruck, Austria, which had recently hosted in 1964.

Seibert led a partnership which bought Snow Basin, near Ogden, Utah, in 1978, but ran into financial difficulty in 1984. The area was sold that October to Earl Holding, owner of Sun Valley in Idaho. Snowbasin was the venue for the alpine speed events of the 2002 Winter Olympics. Pete's Bowl in Vail's Blue Sky Basin, and the Pete's Express lift, was named for Seibert when the second phase of the expansion area opened in December 2000.

== Death ==
Seibert died at his home in nearby Edwards age 77 on July 15, 2002, following a nine-month battle with esophageal cancer, and was buried in Vail Memorial Park. A small plaza, built in the 1970s, at the top of Bridge Street in Vail is named Seibert Circle in his honor.

== Works ==
- Vail: Triumph of a Dream (2000)
