= 620th Engineer General Service Company =

US Army formation from WW2

The 620th Engineer General Service Company was a United States Army Corps of Engineers company active during World War II whose rank and file were American soldiers, both native and foreign-born, who were suspected of disloyalty or subversion.

== Formation ==
The idea of US Army formations consisting of suspect soldiers was created by a United States Department of War order of 3 October 1942. The units were to be composed of soldiers from all over the United States suspected, but not proved, of disloyalty or subversive tendencies. The 620th Engineer General Service Co. was formed on 1 November 1942 at Fort Meade, South Dakota, where it was assigned to the 7th Service Command. In addition to the 620th, two similar units in the same command were the 358th Quartermaster Service Co. at Camp Carson, Colorado, composed of suspected Italian-American and German-American soldiers, and the 525th Engineer General Service Co. at Ft. Leonard Wood, Missouri, composed of suspected Japanese-American soldiers. An engineer general service unit's official function was to perform "general engineer work". For example, the 620th's responsibilities included building fencing and applying burlap strips to fishing nets to create camouflage netting.

The company's table of organization and equipment was authorized a strength of five officers and 127 non commissioned officers and other ranks. Unlike the rest of the army, the company was dressed in the obsolete pre-war blue denim fatigue uniform that was the same uniform worn by prisoners of war with the exception that the initials "PW" were not painted on the uniforms. The company was not allowed to bear arms.

The 620th was transferred to Camp Hale, Colorado, in December 1943 due to the closure of Fort Meade. Besides the 10th Mountain Division that included several anti-National Socialist Austrian ski instructors, Camp Hale also housed a group of approximately 200 German Afrika Korps prisoners of war, whose barracks were only a couple hundred yards from those of the 620th. According to Mckay Jenkins, "The two groups quickly found common ground, and a brisk trade in cigarettes, wine and whiskey grew up between the two housing sections." The close relations between some of the company's members and the POWs led to one of the Engineers, Dale Maple, taking two of the POWs to Mexico where they were sent back across the US border and recaptured. Maple became the first soldier in the United States Army to be convicted of crime equivalent to treason.

In March 1944, the 620th was re-designated Company "A" of the 1800th Engineer General Service Battalion and assigned to Bell Buckle, Tennessee. Company "B" was formerly the 525th Engineer General Service Co and Company "C" was formerly the 358th Quartermaster Service Co. The good treatment and apparent easy life of the unit attracted a variety of American soldiers suspected of avoiding combat duty where it was joked "a subversive word a day keeps the foxhole away".

In June 1945, Companies "A" and "C" were re-designated the 5000th Quartermaster Service Company and sent to the South West Pacific. Company "B" was re-designated the 4000th Engineer General Service Company.

== Disbandment ==
The units were soon disbanded after the surrender of Japan.
