= Camp Hale =

U.S. Army training facility in Colorado, U.S.

- Camp Hale Site
- U.S. National Register of Historic Places
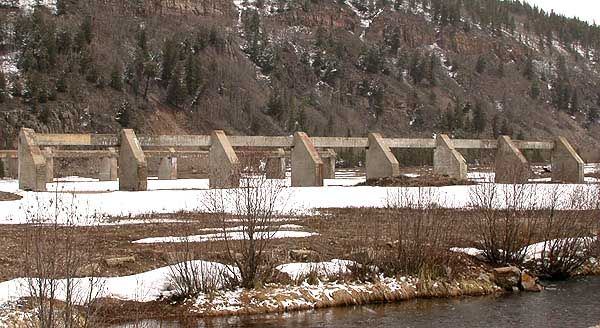
- Concrete ruins of the field house
- Location: Eagle County, Colorado, U.S.
- Nearest city: Red Cliff, Colorado
- Coordinates: 39.4430°N 106.3228°W
- Built: 1942; 84 years ago
- Architect: U.S. Army
- NRHP reference No.: 78003522
- Added to NRHP: 10 April 1992

Location of Camp Hale

Camp Hale was a U.S. Army training facility in the western United States, constructed in 1942 for what became the 10th Mountain Division. Located in central Colorado between Red Cliff and Leadville in the Eagle River Valley at an elevation of 9,238 feet (2,815 m), it was named for General Irving Hale. Onslow S. Rolfe, who had developed mountain warfare techniques as commander of the 87th Mountain Infantry Regiment, was selected to command Camp Hale.

Soldiers were trained in mountain climbing, Alpine and Nordic skiing, cold-weather survival, and various weapons and ordnance. When it was in full operation, approximately 15,000 soldiers were housed there.

The creation of an elite ski corps was a national effort, with assistance from the National Association of Ski Patrol, local ski clubs, and Hollywood. Enough men were recruited to create three army regiments, which were deployed after training. Camp Hale was decommissioned in November 1945.

On 12 October 2022, President Joe Biden designated Camp Hale and a noncontiguous nearby part of the Tenmile Range as Camp Hale—Continental Divide National Monument. It comprises 53,804 acres (84 sq mi; 218 km^{2}), which will be managed by the White River National Forest unit of the U.S. Forest Service. Conversion of the site to a monument will not affect any permits held by the neighboring ski resorts and the monument will continue to support a wide range of motorized and non-motorized recreation opportunities.

== World War II ==
=== Construction ===
The armed ski corps in the U.S. was based on the ski warfare tactics of the Finnish Army during the Winter War (1939–1940). Early in the effort, 8,000 skiers and outdoorsmen were recruited. The camp was built to accommodate the effort at a cost of $30 million.

The War Department chose the location at 9,200 feet (2,800 m) because the Denver and Rio Grande Western Railroad stopped at Pando rail station and historically the snowfall in the Tennessee Pass area was plentiful. Construction of the camp began in the spring of 1942 and finished seven months later; during that period Highway 24 was moved, a sewage system installed to prevent pollution in the nearby town of Red Cliff, and the meadow drained. Additionally, the nearby town of Leadville to the south, the only source of recreation for the trainees, was persuaded to change its moral character, perceived "to be on a rather low plane."

The camp included mess halls, infirmaries, a ski shop, administrative offices, a movie theater, and stables for livestock. White painted barracks for 15,000 soldiers were built straight lines on the mountain meadow, but when the first trainees of the 87th Regiment of the 10th Light Division, quickly renamed the 10th Mountain Division, arrived in the winter of 1942 only a small portion of barracks were filled. The War Department needed to train more skiers in the elite fighting ski corps and asked the American Ski Patrol Association to contact ski racing clubs, ski schools, and local patrol units, nationwide—each applicant had to supply three letters of recommendation.

=== Recruitment ===
After 1942 problems in communication caused by the war slowed the recruitment effort. However, that year, Darryl Zanuck released Sun Valley Serenade, starring Sonja Henie and featuring the Glenn Miller Orchestra, and filmed on location in Sun Valley. The movie was a hit and the Hollywood effort helped to interest trainees in the ski corps. Two more wartime movies were made, each filmed at Camp Hale, featuring the white-clad elite troops—Mountain Fighters in 1943 and I Love a Soldier in 1944. The ski corps was featured on national magazine covers and popular radio shows. Although the effort brought in recruits to add the 86th and 85th Regiments for a full division, recruiters realized not enough skiers existed to fill the new regiments; thereafter, efforts were made to bring in rugged outdoorsmen of all types with the slogan that the 10th Mountain Division was made up of "college boys to cowboys". In addition, 200 women from the Women's Army Corps were brought in for administrative support.

=== Training ===
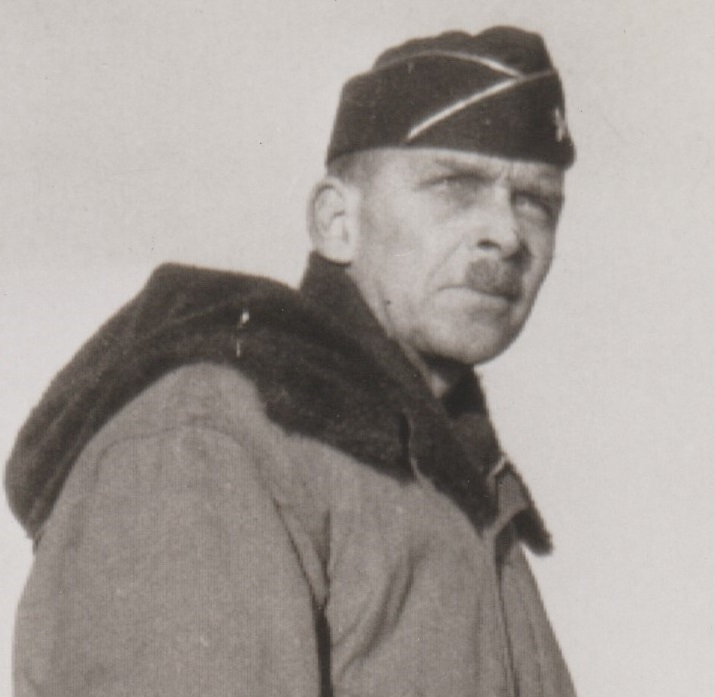
Lloyd E. Jones observes troops land at Amchitka Island during the Aleutians Campaign, shortly before assuming command of the 10th Light Division at Camp Hale.

By 1943, Camp Hale had as many as 14,000 men in training. Conditions in the camp were harsh: the altitude required acclimation and the shallow valley created polluted inversion layers, as the primary energy source was coal. Recreation (outside of skiing) was non-existent because of the camp's high mountain isolation, which prevented even the USO from visiting, and many of the non-skiing trainees hated skiing. Trainees were taught to ski at Cooper Hill by ski instructors, brought from the ski-areas such as Sun Valley and Waterville Valley. Located three miles (5 km) south of the camp, Cooper Hill had on-site barracks for the instructors and a newly built T-bar lift for the trainees.

Military use of Camp Hale included the 10th Mountain Division, commanded by Lloyd E. Jones, the 38th Regimental Combat Team, the Norwegian-American 99th Infantry Battalion (Separate), and soldiers from Fort Carson conducting mountain and winter warfare training exercises. Trainees were taught skiing, mountain climbing, snow survival skills (such as building snow caves), and winter combat. Also present at Camp Hale was the 620th Engineer General Service Company, a unit composed of suspected unreliable German-Americans or soldiers with suspected pro-National Socialist beliefs.

Camp Hale was active for just three years; it was deactivated in November 1945 and the 10th Mountain Division moved to Texas.

=== Prisoner of war camp ===
Camp Hale held "about 400 of the most incorrigible members of Field Marshal Erwin Rommel's Afrika Corps". On 15 February 1944, guard Private Dale Maple of the 620th Engineer General Service Unit drove away with German Sergeants Heinrich Kikillus and Erhard Schwichtenberg. They made it to Mexico before being arrested and turned over to U.S. authorities. In an unrelated scandal, in March 1944, five WACs were charged with exchanging notes with the prisoners. Three received sentences of four to six months of confinement. The army used POWs to dismantle most of the structures in 1945.

== Late 20th century ==
Many Tibetan resistance fighters were secretly trained at Camp Hale by the CIA. "By February 1963, four groups totaling 135 Tibetans (ten more than originally planned) had arrived at Hale." This was "... the first wave of Tibetans." The site was chosen because of the similarities of the terrain and elevation with the Himalayan Plateau, being heavily mountainous and over 10,000 feet above sea level. The fighters were trained in the use of mortars, explosive, and rifles and instructed in the art of guerilla warfare and subterfuge. The Tibetans nicknamed the camp "Dhumra", meaning "The Garden", due to their enriched hatred of the Chinese occupation of their country. To cover up their newly heightened activity within the camp, the CIA circulated a story in the local press that Camp Hale was to be the site of atomic tests and would be a high security zone going forward. Until the camp was closed in 1964, the entire area was cordoned off and its perimeter patrolled by military police to keep any unwanted eyes away. In all, around 259 Tibetans were trained at Camp Hale, and after it was dismantled, no Tibetans remained in Colorado having all been redeployed into their homeland to fight against the Chinese. From 1958 to 1960, Anthony Poshepny trained various special missions teams, including Tibetan Khambas and Hui Muslims, for operations in China against the communist government.

In 1965, Camp Hale was dismantled and the land was deeded to the U.S. Forest Service. Since 1974, the area has become a youth development training center. An Eagle County non-profit organization, SOS Outreach, has used the site to expose disadvantaged youth to many of the same outdoor challenges experienced by the 10th Mountain Division.

In 1962, Pete Seibert, who was among the soldiers who trained at Camp Hale and then returned to the area after the war, founded the Vail Ski Resort nearby.

In July and August 1985 the valley was the site of the North American Pathfinder camporee with 16,129 attending.

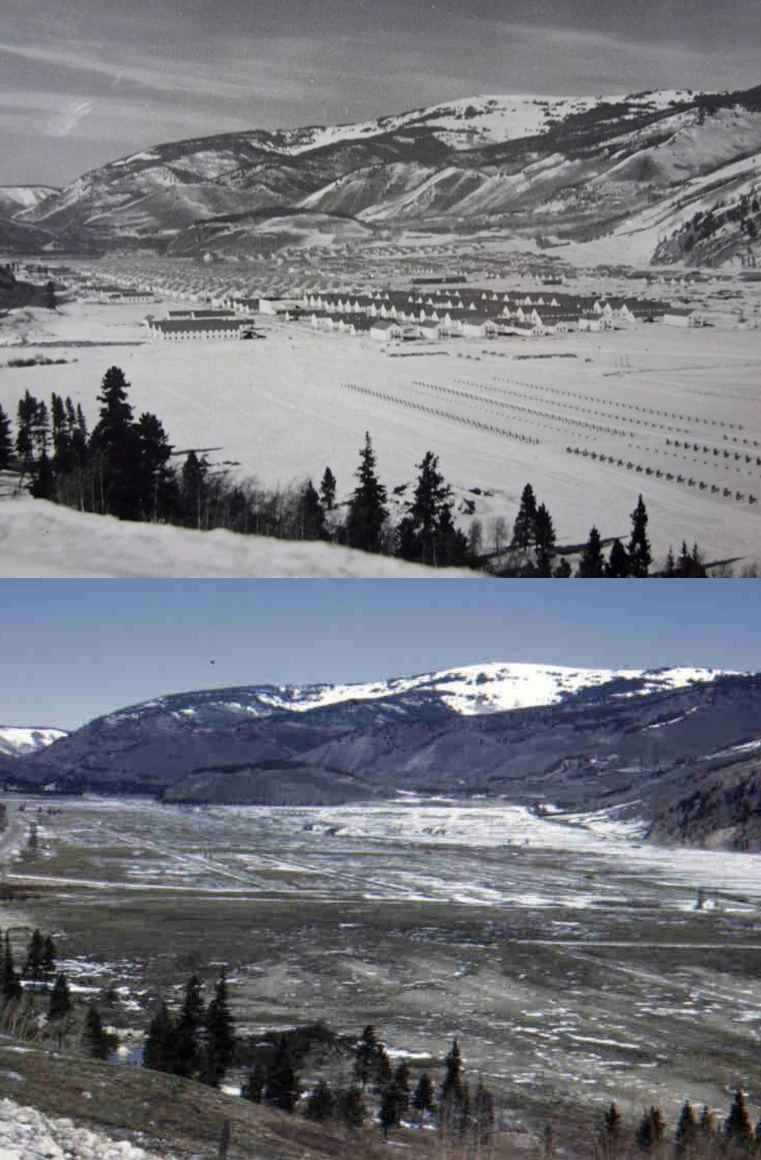
Then and now

== Current status ==
In 2003, the U.S. Army Corps of Engineers began a cleanup effort to remove some of the unexploded ordnance at the site in conjunction with several other government agencies. This effort is still ongoing.

Most of the remnants of Camp Hale are located in the White River National Forest. There are camping grounds where overnight camping is permitted on this former army base. Several informational plaques are located throughout the area. These plaques contain historical information about camp construction, the 99th Infantry Battalion, ski training, rock climbing/alpine training, the motor pool area, CIA training, and camp entertainment.

== National Monument ==
In 2019, the Camp Hale site was proposed to be the first National Historic Landscape, under the Colorado Outdoor Recreation & Economy (CORE) Act, which would designate 28,728 acres for preservation. Congressman Joe Neguse hosted Agriculture Secretary Tom Vilsack, Colorado Governor Jared Polis, and U.S. Senators Michael Bennet and John Hickenlooper at Camp Hale on 22 August 2022, in support of the bill. With the bill stalled in Congress, on 12 October 2022, President Biden visited the site with the same five leaders and used the Antiquities Act to declare the site a national monument, the 53,804-acre Camp Hale – Continental Divide National Monument. While the designation had support of area mayors and county commissioners and "drew a flurry of praise from political, social and conservation groups", various conservative politicians spoke out in opposition to the new national monument. A survey had found 86% of Coloradans supported national monument protections for Colorado recreation and conservation areas.

The monument includes approximately 28,684 acres in the Camp Hale area and 25,210 acres in the Tenmile area. The Tenmile area was originally proposed in the CORE Act to be recreation management area and wilderness area. The Continental Divide Trail passes through both sections for approximately 20 miles.

== See also ==
- Chushi Gangdruk
- List of national monuments of the United States
- List of protected areas of Colorado
- M116 howitzer
- M29 Weasel
- Ski Cooper
- Tibetan Resistance Since 1950

== Sources ==
- "Veterans Closer than Brothers". The Denver Post. 29 July 2007. Retrieved 30 January 2010.
- Cowan, Jay. Big Pete's Last Drive. The Aspen Times. 17 February 2007. Retrieved 30 January 2010.
- Govan, Thomas B., Captain. History of the Tenth Light Division (Alpine) The Army Ground Forces Study, No. 28. 1946. Retrieved 1 January 2011.
- Govan, Thomas B., Captain. "The Army Ground Forces:Training For Mountain and Winter Warfare" The Army Ground Forces Study, No. 23. 1946. Retrieved 1 January 2011.
- Shelton, Peter. Climb to Conquer: The Untold Story of WWII's 10th Mountain Division. Scribner, 2003. ISBN 0-7432-2606-2.
