= Vail Ski Resort =

Ski resort in Vail, Colorado, US

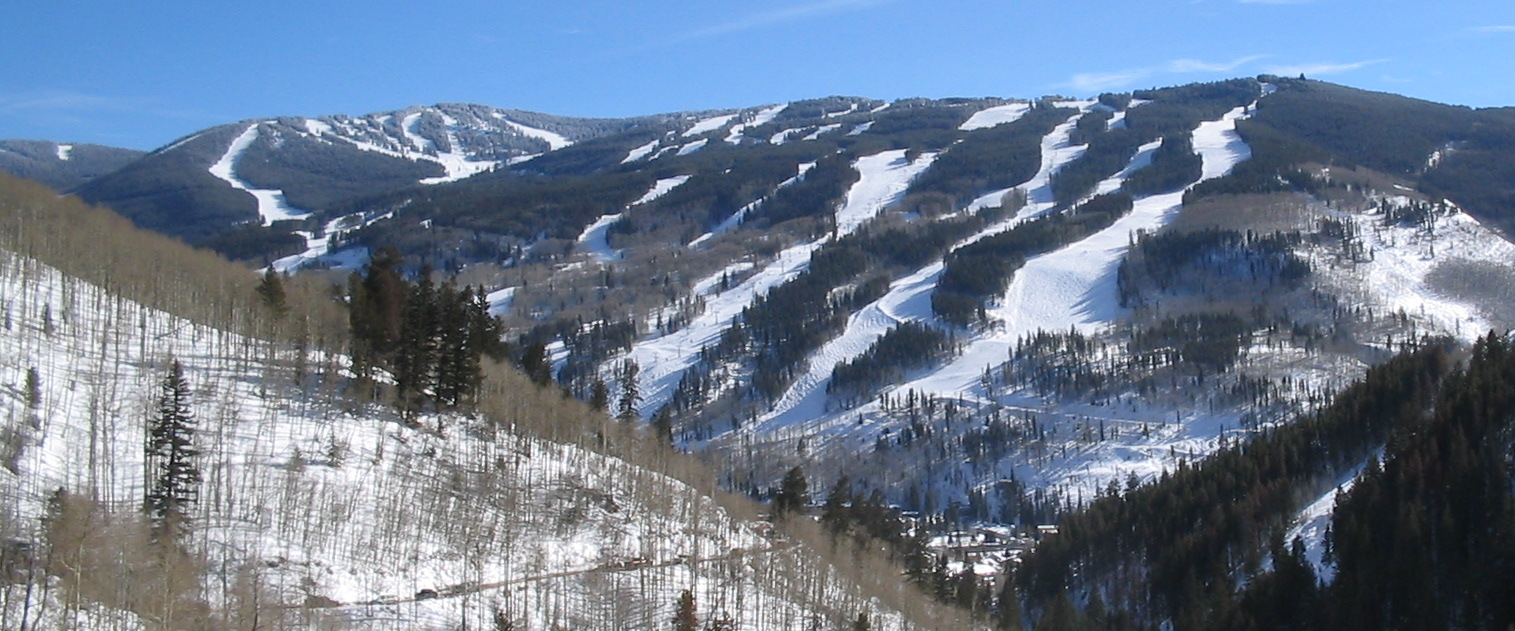
- Front side of Vail Resort in 2005

- Location in Colorado Location in the United States
- Location: Vail, Eagle County, Colorado, United States
- Nearest city: Denver – 100 miles (160 km) (via Interstate 70)
- Coordinates: 39.639°N 106.374°W
- Status: Operating
- Owner: Vail Resorts
- Vertical: 3,450 ft (1,052 m)
- Top elevation: 11,570 ft (3,527 m)
- Base elevation: 8,120 ft (2,475 m)
- Skiable area: 5,317 acres (8.3 mi^{2}; 21.5 km^{2})
- Trails: 195 total 18% beginner 29% intermediate 53% advanced
- Longest run: Riva Ridge – 4 miles (6.5 km)
- Lift system: 31 total (2 gondolas (12 and 10 person), 4 high speed six's, 14 high speed quads, 1 fixed grip quad, 2 fixed grip triples, 9 surface lifts)
- Terrain parks: Yes, 2, 1 Super-Pipe
- Snowfall: 354 in (29.5 ft; 9.0 m)
- Snowmaking: Yes
- Night skiing: No
- Website: vail.com

Vail Ski Resort is a ski resort near the town of Vail in Eagle County, Colorado, United States. At 5,289 acres (8.3 sq mi; 21.4 km^{2}), it is the third-largest single-mountain ski resort in the U.S., behind Big Sky and Park City, featuring seven bowls and intermediate gladed terrain in Blue Sky Basin.

Opened in late 1962, Vail is one of 42 mountain resorts owned and operated by Vail Resorts, which also operates three other nearby ski resorts (Beaver Creek, Breckenridge, and Keystone).

Vail Mountain has three sections: The Front-Side, Blue Sky Basin, and the Back Bowls. Most of the resort is wide open terrain with all types of trails. There are cruising runs accessible from most front side and Blue Sky Basin lifts, as well as the wide open Back Bowls, glades, and chutes.

Vail has the fourth-largest area of skiable terrain in North America after Whistler Blackcomb, Park City Mountain Resort, and Big Sky.

Vail Village is modeled on Bavarian village styles, with pedestrian streets. Unlike other Colorado ski towns such as Aspen, Breckenridge, or Steamboat Springs, which existed as 19th century mining towns prior to the establishment of their ski resorts, the Vail village was built when the resort opened.

== History ==
=== 1960s ===
Vail Ski Resort was founded 64 years ago in 1962 by Earl Eaton, John Tweedy, Pete Seibert, Harley Higbie, and others. It is at the base of Vail Pass, named after Charles Vail, designer of the highway that passed through the valley.

During World War II, Massachusetts native Seibert joined the U.S. Army's Tenth Mountain Division which trained at Camp Hale, fourteen miles (23 km) south of Vail, between Red Cliff and Leadville. During the training, Seibert and Eaton became familiar with the surrounding terrain, areas of which would become resorts in later decades. They discovered a peak that they believed to be well-located and with good snow, calling it No-name Mountain, which later became Vail.

Construction of the resort began in the then-uninhabited valley in 1962, and it opened six months later on December 15. There were originally three lifts, including one gondola that ran from Vail Village to Mid-Vail on the line where Gondola One operates. Several double chairlifts were later built: Golden Peak, which ran from Golden Peak base area up to the Riva Bahn Express midstation; Giant Steps, which ran from Vail Village to the bottom of the Avanti Express lift; the Avanti double chairlift; and two double chairlifts out of Mid-Vail, the Mountaintop and Hunky Dory lifts. A double chairlift, High Noon, serviced the Sun Down and Sun Up Bowls on the backside of the ridge. As Vail grew, a village formed at the base near the gondola, which was taken down in the 1970s and replaced with a Lift Engineering double chairlift.

=== 1970s ===
By the early 1970s, the construction of Interstate 70 from Vail to Denver was mostly completed, replacing US Route 6. The opening of the Eisenhower Tunnel in 1973 (north bore, now westbound) provided easier access from Denver to ski resorts like Copper Mountain, Breckenridge, and Vail. Also in the mid-1970s, President Gerald Ford and family continued to vacation at their Vail home, bringing it international exposure. Later, Vail Village was expanded. In May 1970, Denver was awarded the 1976 Winter Olympics, with Vail later selected (in early 1972) to host the alpine competitions, moving from the original sites just east of Loveland Pass; Loveland Ski Area (slalom) and undeveloped Mount Sniktau (downhill, giant slalom). However, Colorado voters denied funding by a 3:2 ratio that November, and the games were relocated to Innsbruck in Austria, which had recently hosted in 1964.

By the mid-1970s, the mountain had been further expanded, with a second gondola added in the Lionshead area, which also included a residences and shops at the base of the slopes.

In 1976, a gondola cable snagged on a support tower on Friday, March 26, and two cabins derailed, killing four people and injuring eight. The gondola was closed for the remainder of the season, and trading in stock of the ski resort's parent company was temporarily suspended.

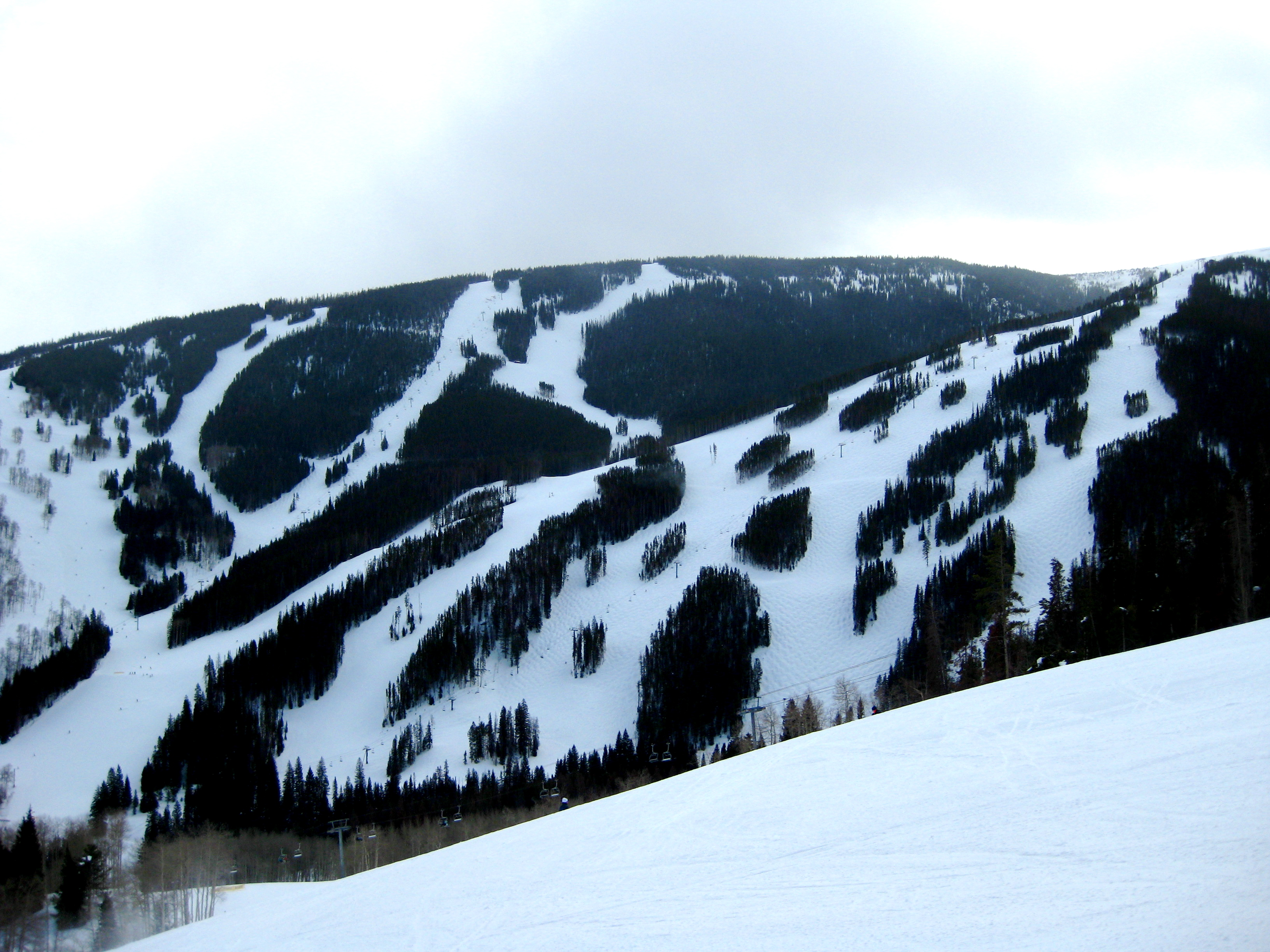
Birds of Prey (ski course), Beaver Creek

Vail hosted the Alpine World Championships in 1989 and co-hosted with nearby Beaver Creek in 1999.

=== 1990s ===
Vail Associates bought Vail, Breckenridge, Keystone, and Heavenly in California in 1996.

In 1998, the resort was attacked by the eco-terrorist group Earth Liberation Front, who set fire to it and caused over $12 million in damage.

The 1999 Alpine World Ski Championships were held in Vail/Beaver Creek.

=== 2000s ===
In 2004, the original Lionshead skier bridge was replaced with a newer, wider bridge.

A new plaza was opened at Vail Village in 2008. On February 27, 2010, one of the original black diamond trails into Vail Village, International, was renamed Lindsey's to honor Vail's Olympic gold medalist Lindsey Vonn. The trail is next to Giant Steps and one of two flanking the defunct Giant Steps lift line.

=== 2010s ===
In 2010, Leitner-Poma constructed another high-speed quad in the Back Bowls. The High Noon Express (#5) replaced a Doppelmayr triple chairlift that had been in use since 1979 and was the resort's 17th high-speed quad to be built.

In 2011, Vail opened a new ski-in/out fine dining restaurant at mid-Vail. The Tenth, built between the Wildwood Express and the Mid-Vail facility, is named for the famed US Army division that trained nearby and several Vail founders once belonged.

By 2012, Vail's original high-speed quads from Doppelmayr were beginning to show their age and were due to be upgraded. The first to go would be the Vista Bahn Express, which as part of Vail's 50th anniversary celebration was replaced by a Leitner-Poma ten person gondola. Gondola One (#1) provides a fast, warm and sheltered ride between Vail Village and the Mid-Vail area.

For the 2016–17 season, the Sun Up lift was replaced with a high–speed quad by Leitner-Poma. The lift was also renumbered as lift No. 9, instead of lift No. 17, as Vail sought to plug numbering gaps in their lift system. With the installation of the Sun Up Express (#9) lift, all major uphill lifts on the mountain are high–speed detachables, and the only fixed grip lifts are Cascade Village, Gopher Hill and Little Eagle.

For the 2017–18 season, Vail built their third high speed six pack when it contracted Leitner-Poma to upgrade the Northwoods Express (#11) lift, which at that point was the remaining lift servicing Patrol Headquarters that had not yet been upgraded.

=== 2020s ===
To mark Vail's 60th anniversary, the 2022-2023 season saw Leitner-Poma construct two new high speed chairlifts. These new lifts included a high speed six pack to replace the Game Creek Express (#7), and a new high speed quad known as the Sun Down Express (#17) to provide direct lift service to the Sun Down Bowl.

With more than 5,289 acres (8.3 mi^{2}; 21.4 km^{2}) and an average snowfall that has averaged 360 inches (30 ft; 9 m) during the last thirty years, Vail is regarded as one of the best combinations of terrain and dependable snow in the country, often ranking No. 1 in Colorado.

Vail has been the number one ski resort in the United States fourteen times in a 17-year period.

== White River National Forest ==
Vail Resorts operates on National Forest System lands under special use permit to the White River National Forest. Master Development Plans, Winter and Summer Operations Plans, Construction Plans, and every phase of the permit holder's skiing operation is approved by the federal government annually prior to construction and operation. In exchange for the use of National Forest system lands the resort pays an annual fee to the U.S. Treasury amounting to about one dollar per skier visit. Twenty-five percent of the fees collected are returned to Eagle County for roads and schools, in lieu of taxes. The federal government supports the objective of providing healthy recreation opportunities in quality natural outdoor environments. Millions of national and international users during all seasons of the year appreciate the opportunities provided by Vail Resorts and White River National Forest through the public and private partnership on federal lands.

Reference: Code of Federal Regulations, Title 36: Parks, Forests, and Public Property, Part 251—Land Uses, § 251.51 Definitions. Ski area —a site and attendant facilities expressly developed to accommodate alpine or Nordic skiing and from which the preponderance of revenue is generated by the sale of lift tickets and fees for ski rentals, for skiing instruction and trail passes for the use of permittee-maintained ski trails. A ski area may also include ancillary facilities directly related to the operation and support of skiing activities.

== Forest Service feasibility studies ==
In 1972 the White River National Forest analyzed the terrain surrounding Vail to determine ski area feasibility of the greater regional area and identify additional opportunities for public parking and access to National Forest lands between Vail Pass and Lake Creek above Edwards. The investigation was stimulated by the planned construction of Interstate 70 over Vail Pass, or alternative Red Buffalo Corridor, and the awarding of the 1976 Winter Olympics to Denver by the International Olympic Committee in 1970 with the showcase downhill event later planned for the yet undeveloped Beaver Creek ski area. New parking areas on Shrine Pass, Battle Mountain, Meadow Mountain, Minturn, Stone Creek, Avon, and Lake Creek were identified as development sites, base areas, and potential new skier entrance portals. Integration of Vail Ski Resort, including Blue Sky Basin, with skiing terrain on Battle Mountain, Grouse Mountain, Meadow Mountain, Stone Creek, Beaver Creek, and Lake Creek were analyzed and considered physically feasible as an integrated mega-resort with multiple portals. Twenty-eight ski lifts were planned for Grouse Mountain above Minturn, which was rated comparable to Snowmass in overall size and capacity with significant amount of terrain in the intermediate category with good snowfall.

Findings were presented to William Lucas, Rocky Mountain Regional Forester, by Thomas Evans, Forest Supervisor, and Erik J. Martin, professional landscape architect, lead member of the Blue Ribbon study committee for ski area planning feasibility, and program manager for ski area administration. Grouse Mountain above Minturn was highly rated for developed alpine skiing and conceived by White River National Forest skiing experts as a potential future phase of a large mega-skiing complex on National Forest System lands linking the existing Vail ski area and Battle Mountain east of Minturn with Grouse Mountain, Beaver Creek, Meadow Mountain ski area, Bachelor Gulch, and Arrowhead on the west side. Development of Grouse Mountain did not occur due to the high cost of development, rejection of the '76 Winter Olympic Games, vocal public opposition at the local and statewide levels, and a desire by Vail Resorts to fully develop Beaver Creek and Vail Mountain prior to expansion. The opportunity to provide developed alpine skiing on Grouse Mountain was eliminated from future consideration with the establishment of the Holy Cross Wilderness in 1980.

== Forest plans ==
The 2002 Revision of the 1984 Land and Resource Management Plan Forest plans, White River National Forest, Chapter 3-Management Area Direction, 8.25 Ski areas – Existing and Potential, pages 3–80 through 3–8, and 8.31 Aerial Transportation Corridors, page 3-84, establishes long-term planning direction for Vail Ski Resort. Lift access from remote areas and new portals, including Minturn, were analyzed in the plan. The theme of an 8.31 aerial transportation corridor designation is to serve the principal purpose of transporting people to, from, and within communities, and ski areas. The theme of an 8.25 land allocation is to allow ski areas on federal lands to be developed and operated by the private sector to provide opportunities for intensively managed outdoor recreation activities during all seasons of the year. The 8.25 management area prescription includes existing developed ski areas and undeveloped expansion areas with potential for future development.

Ski areas provide winter sports activities and other intensively managed outdoor recreation opportunities for large numbers of national and international visitors in highly developed settings. In some areas, use in the summer may be as intensive as in the winter. The White River National Forest forest plan addresses vegetation management, intensity of use, seasons of use, and motorized access. The 8.25 management area includes existing resorts that have already been permitted and developed, as well as additional suitable terrain into which development is planned for the future. The 1984 Forest Plan and 2002 revision were authored by Erik J. Martin, Program Manager for Ski Area Administration, to identify future expansion opportunities and alternative special-use permit boundaries for Vail ski area. The 1984 Land and Resource Management Plan [Forest plan] was revised in 2002, and analyzed in a Final Environmental Impact Statement. A summary of the Final Environmental Impact Statement to accompany the Land and Resource Management Plan – 2002 Revision is available to the public at local Forest Service Offices, public library, or National Forest web site.

== Topography and configuration ==
=== Elevation ===
- Summit: 11,570 feet (3,527 m)
- Base: 8,120 feet (2,475 m)
- Vertical: 3,450 feet (1,052 m)

=== Slope aspects ===
- North: 40% of skiable terrain.
- South: 20%
- East: 20%
- West: 20%

=== Trails ===
- Skiable area: 5,289 acres (8.3 sq mi; 21.4 km^{2})
- Trails: 193 total (18% beginner, 29% intermediate, 53% advanced/expert)
- Longest run: Riva Ridge – four miles (6.5 km)
- Average annual snowfall: 370 inches (30.8 ft; 9.4 m)
- terrain parks: 3
  - 1 Superpipe
- Bowls: 10 (7 official)
  - Sun Down Bowl
  - Sun Up Bowl
  - China Bowl
  - Siberia Bowl
  - Tea Cup Bowl
  - Inner Mongolia Bowl
  - Outer Mongolia Bowl
  - Pete's Bowl
  - Earl's Bowl
  - Game Creek Bowl

=== Lifts ===
Lift	Lift name	Length (feet)	Vertical (feet)	Type	Make	Year installed
1	One	9,308	1,996	Gondola	Leitner-Poma	2012
2	Avanti Express	6,640	1,466	High Speed Six	Doppelmayr	2015
3	Wildwood Express	3,350	852	High Speed Quad	Garaventa CTEC	1995
4	Mountaintop Express	4,284	1,108	High Speed Six	Doppelmayr	2013
5	High Noon Express	5,570	1,852	High Speed Quad	Leitner-Poma	2010
6	Riva Bahn Express	9,051	1,705	High Speed Quad	Doppelmayr CTEC	1996
7	Game Creek Express	4,484	1,184	High Speed Six	Leitner-Poma	2022
8	Born Free Express	6,076	1,593	High Speed Quad	Doppelmayr	1988
9	Sun Up Express	3,874	1,109	High Speed Quad	Leitner-Poma	2016
10	Highline Express	6,729	1,755	High Speed Quad	Leitner-Poma	2007
11	Northwoods Express	5,905	1,545	High Speed Six	Leitner-Poma	2017
12	Gopher Hill	937	146	Fixed Triple	Doppelmayr	2013
14	Sourdough Express	2,437	512	High Speed Quad	Leitner-Poma	2007
15	Little Eagle	1,012	111	Fixed Triple	Doppelmayr	2007
16	Golden Peak	2,137	683	T-Bar	Doppelmayr	2019
17	Sun Down Express	6,106	1,586	High Speed Quad	Leitner-Poma	2022
19	Eagle Bahn Gondola	9,148	2,215	Gondola	Garaventa CTEC	1996
20	Cascade Village	3,497	1,278	Fixed Quad	CTEC	1987
21	Orient Express	7,658	1,565	High Speed Quad	Doppelmayr	1988
22	Mongolia	1,611	312	Platter	Doppelmayr	1988
24	Wapiti	710	17	Platter	Poma	1992
26	Pride Express	5,415	1,225	High Speed Quad	Garaventa CTEC	1993
27	Black Forest	1,919	401	Platter	Doppelmayr	1995
36	Teacup Express	6,704	1,663	High Speed Quad	Poma	1999
37	Skyline Express	8,391	1,936	High Speed Quad	Poma	1999
38	Earl's Express	4,834	1,357	High Speed Quad	Poma	1999
39	Pete's Express	6,677	1,582	High Speed Quad	Poma	2000

== Climate ==
There is a SNOTEL weather station for Vail Mountain, located near Eagles Nest at an elevation of 10,300 feet or 3,139 meters. Vail Mountain has a subalpine climate (Köppen Dfc).

Climate data for Vail Mountain, Colorado (elevation 10,300 feet or 3,139 meters), 1991–2020 normals, 1985–2020 extremes
Month	Jan	Feb	Mar	Apr	May	Jun	Jul	Aug	Sep	Oct	Nov	Dec	Year
Record high °F (°C)	53 (12)	52 (11)	64 (18)	66 (19)	75 (24)	80 (27)	82 (28)	79 (26)	76 (24)	67 (19)	62 (17)	51 (11)	82 (28)
Mean maximum °F (°C)	43.9 (6.6)	44.5 (6.9)	51.5 (10.8)	57.8 (14.3)	64.5 (18.1)	72.1 (22.3)	75.5 (24.2)	73.4 (23.0)	69.3 (20.7)	61.0 (16.1)	50.9 (10.5)	43.7 (6.5)	76.1 (24.5)
Mean daily maximum °F (°C)	27.8 (−2.3)	29.9 (−1.2)	37.5 (3.1)	43.5 (6.4)	52.0 (11.1)	62.5 (16.9)	68.1 (20.1)	65.9 (18.8)	58.9 (14.9)	46.8 (8.2)	35.2 (1.8)	27.4 (−2.6)	46.3 (7.9)
Daily mean °F (°C)	19.9 (−6.7)	21.3 (−5.9)	27.8 (−2.3)	33.4 (0.8)	42.1 (5.6)	52.1 (11.2)	57.9 (14.4)	56.1 (13.4)	49.4 (9.7)	38.0 (3.3)	27.2 (−2.7)	19.8 (−6.8)	37.1 (2.8)
Mean daily minimum °F (°C)	12.0 (−11.1)	12.6 (−10.8)	18.0 (−7.8)	23.2 (−4.9)	32.2 (0.1)	41.8 (5.4)	47.6 (8.7)	46.2 (7.9)	39.8 (4.3)	29.2 (−1.6)	19.2 (−7.1)	12.1 (−11.1)	27.8 (−2.3)
Mean minimum °F (°C)	−4.4 (−20.2)	−3.7 (−19.8)	1.7 (−16.8)	8.7 (−12.9)	19.2 (−7.1)	30.0 (−1.1)	40.0 (4.4)	38.9 (3.8)	25.7 (−3.5)	11.4 (−11.4)	−0.3 (−17.9)	−5.8 (−21.0)	−9.4 (−23.0)
Record low °F (°C)	−15 (−26)	−23 (−31)	−15 (−26)	1 (−17)	8 (−13)	19 (−7)	28 (−2)	31 (−1)	9 (−13)	−5 (−21)	−11 (−24)	−25 (−32)	−25 (−32)
Average precipitation inches (mm)	3.64 (92)	3.47 (88)	3.87 (98)	4.36 (111)	2.96 (75)	1.25 (32)	1.80 (46)	1.78 (45)	2.11 (54)	2.65 (67)	3.20 (81)	3.08 (78)	34.17 (867)
Average extreme snow depth inches (cm)	45.8 (116)	54.7 (139)	60.4 (153)	57.4 (146)	42.1 (107)	8.1 (21)	0.5 (1.3)	0.4 (1.0)	1.5 (3.8)	7.9 (20)	17.5 (44)	32.0 (81)	62.5 (159)
Average precipitation days (≥ 0.01 in)	16.2	15.3	15.6	15.8	11.0	5.1	8.1	8.4	8.2	10.0	13.2	14.5	141.4
Source 1: XMACIS2(normals, records & 2006–2020 snow depth)
Source 2: NOAA (precip/precip days)
