= Pando, Colorado =

Extinct town in Colorado, United States

Coordinates: 39°27′26″N 106°20′01″W

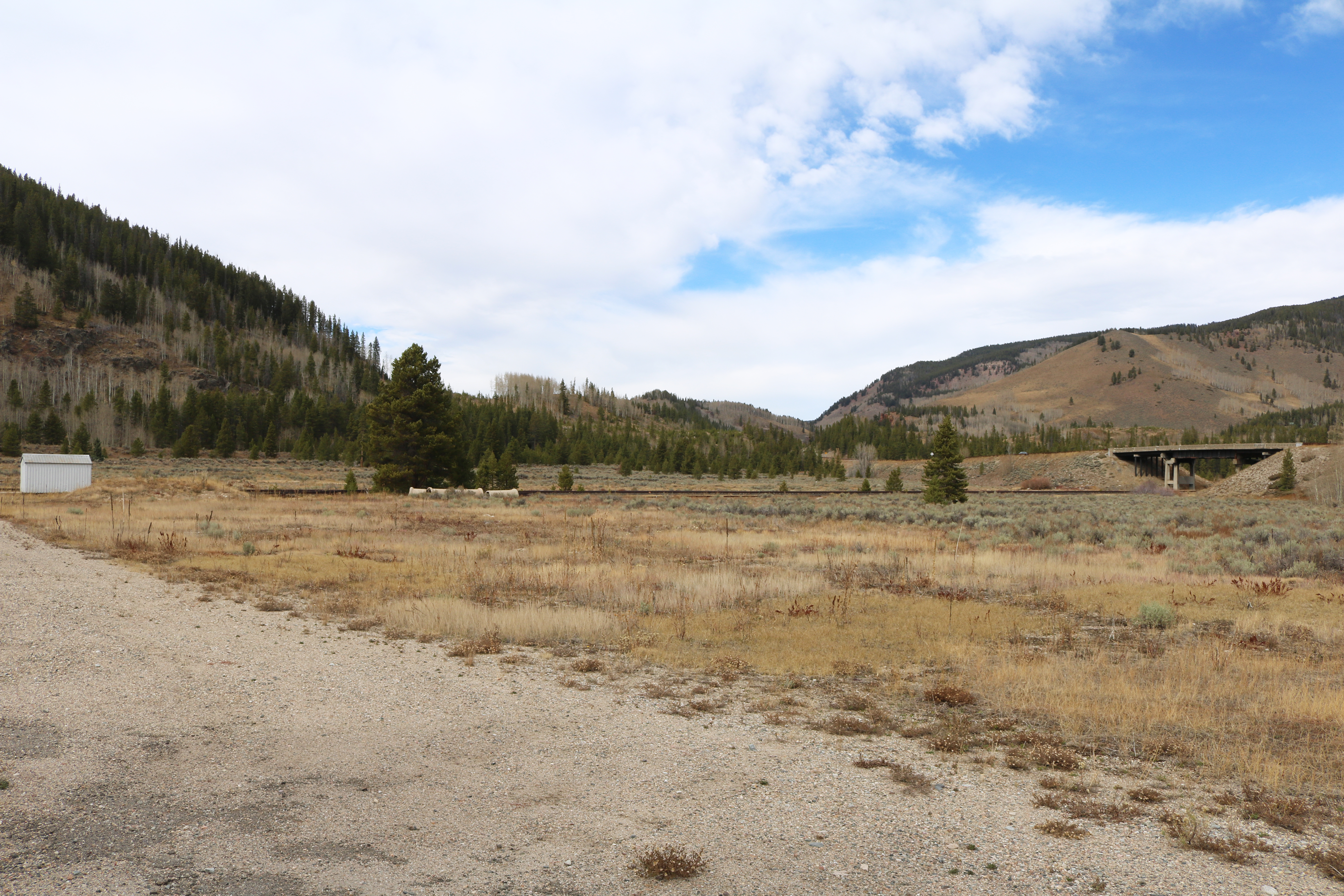
Contemporary Pando, October 2020

Pando is an extinct town in Eagle County, Colorado, United States. The GNIS classifies it as a populated place.

== History ==
A post office called Pando was in operation from 1891 until 1942. Pando is a name derived from Spanish meaning "slow".

== See also ==
- List of ghost towns in Colorado
