= Blue Sky Basin =

Area of Vail Ski Resort

Coordinates: 39°35′47″N 106°19′51″W

Blue Sky Basin is the most recent expansion to Vail Ski Resort in Colorado in the United States. It opened to skiers in 2000 despite conflict about whether the expansion would endanger the lynx, a mountain cat re-introduced into the Colorado wilds.

In response, the largest eco-terrorist attack in the United States occurred at Vail in 1998 - a $12 million incident involving several Vail facilities, including the destruction of the Two Elk restaurant. Authorities believe it was planned by William C. Rodgers and other environmental activists. The FBI launched Operation Backfire, which eventually led to convictions of the arsonists. The incident created sympathy for the resort, if not necessarily for Blue Sky Basin or the corporate owner, Vail Resorts.

The Basin opened on 6 January 2000 with three high-speed quad chairlifts, an extra 525 acres (2.12 km^{2}) added to Vail's already enormous size — over 5,000 acres (20 km^{2}).

Blue Sky Basin offers a more natural ski experience down its 1,900-foot (580 m) vertical drop, with mostly meadows and glades, rather than wide, clear-cut runs.
