= Ten Mile =

Ten Mile or Tenmile may refer to:

- 10-mile run, running competition over ten miles
- Ten Mile, Yukon, Canada
- Tenmile, Kentucky, USA
- Ten Mile, Mississippi
- Ten Mile, Lewis County, Missouri
- Ten Mile, Macon County, Missouri
- Tenmile, Coos County, Oregon
- Tenmile, Douglas County, Oregon
- Ten Mile, Pennsylvania
- Ten Mile, Tennessee
- Tenmile, West Virginia
- Tenmile Range

== See also ==
- Battle of the Tenth Milestone, fought 533 between the Vandals and the Byzantine Empire
- Tenmile Creek (disambiguation)
- Ten Mile Creek Bridge (disambiguation)
- Ten Mile Lake (disambiguation)
- Ten Mile Point (disambiguation)
- Ten Mile River (disambiguation)
- Ten Mile Run (disambiguation)
- Ten Miles
