= Tenmile Creek =

Tenmile Creek or Ten Mile Creek may refer to streams in:

== California ==
- Tenmile Creek (Kings River), a tributary of the Kings River (California)
- Tenmile Creek (South Fork Eel River), in California

== Colorado ==
- Tenmile Creek (Colorado)

== Georgia ==
- Tenmile Creek (Altamaha River tributary)

== Illinois ==
- Tenmile Creek (North Fork Saline River), a tributary of the Saline River (Illinois)

== Maryland ==
- Tenmile Creek (Maryland)
- Ten Mile Creek, Maryland

== Missouri ==
- Tenmile Creek (Cane Creek)
- Ten Mile Creek (North Fork Salt River)

== Montana ==
- Tenmile Creek (Lewis and Clark County, Montana)

== New York ==
- Tenmile Creek (Catskill Creek)

== Ohio ==
- Tenmile Creek (Ottawa River), a tributary of the Ottawa River (Lake Erie)

== Oregon ==
- Tenmile Creek (Coos County, Oregon)
- Tenmile Creek (Lane County, Oregon)

== Pennsylvania ==
- Tenmile Creek (Pennsylvania), a tributary of the Monongahela River

== Washington ==
- Tenmile Creek (Nooksack River)
- Tenmile Creek (Snake River)

== West Virginia ==
- Tenmile Creek (Buckhannon River)
- Tenmile Creek (West Fork River)

== Wisconsin ==
- Tenmile Creek (Wisconsin River tributary)

== See also ==
- Ten Mile River (disambiguation)
- Ten Mile Creek Bridge (disambiguation)
- North Tenmile Creek Trail
