= Tenmile Peak =

Mountain in the American state of Colorado

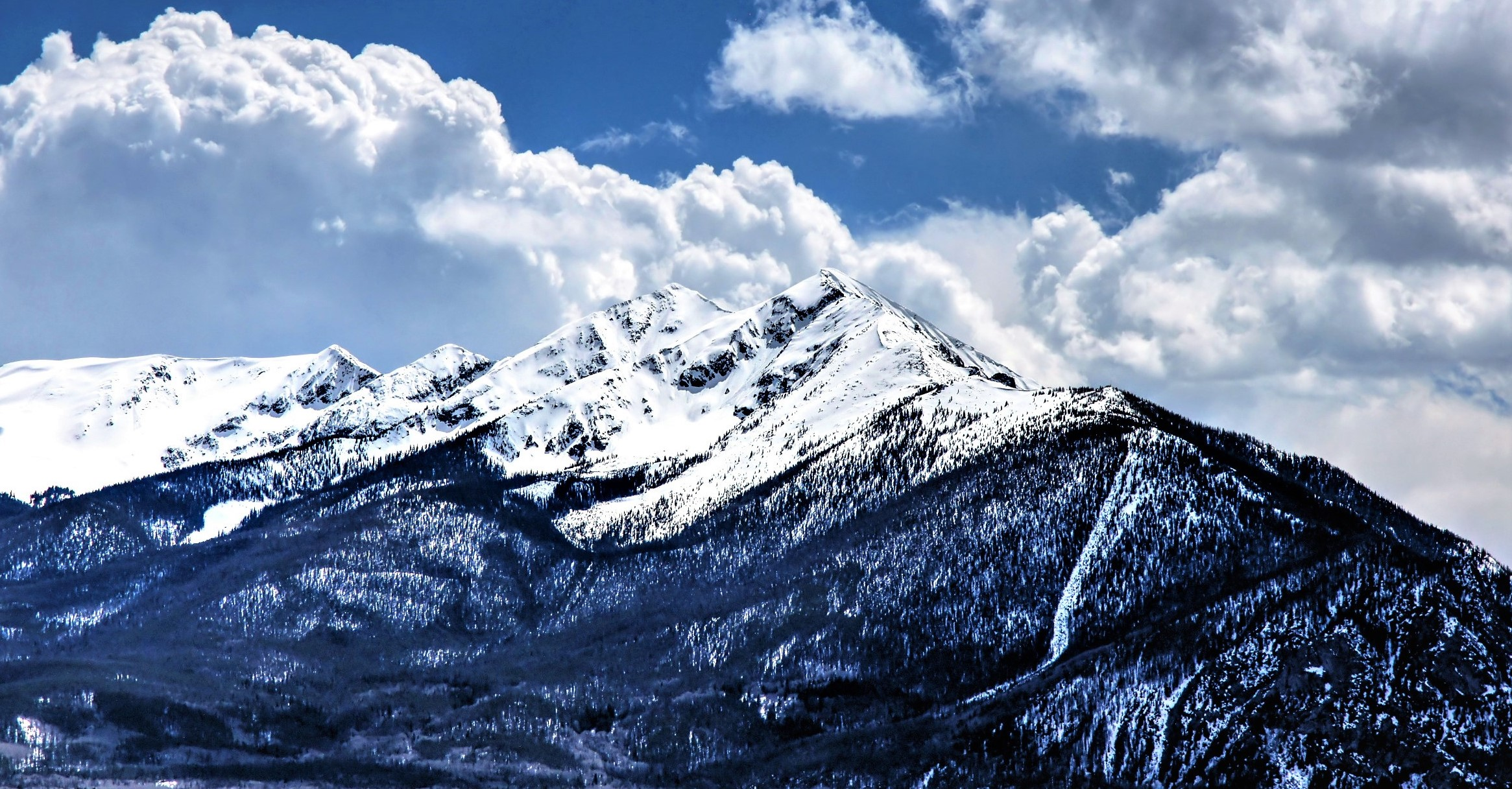
- North-northeast aspect of Tenmile Peak and Peak 1

Highest point
- Elevation: 12,938 ft (3,944 m)
- Prominence: 808 ft (246 m)
- Parent peak: Peak 8 (13,005 ft)
- Isolation: 4.49 mi (7.23 km)
- Coordinates: 39°32′09″N 106°07′16″W

Geography
- Location within Colorado Location within the United States
- Country: United States
- State: Colorado
- County: Summit County
- Parent range: Rocky Mountains; Tenmile Range
- Topo map: USGS Frisco

Climbing
- Easiest route: Hiking class 2

Tenmile Peak is a 12,938-foot (3,944 m) mountain summit in Summit County, Colorado, United States.

== Description ==
Tenmile Peak is set 15 miles (24 km) west of the Continental Divide in the Tenmile Range which is a subrange of the Rocky Mountains. The mountain is located three miles (4.8 km) southwest of the community of Frisco and is set on land managed by Arapaho National Forest. The Continental Divide Trail traverses the east slope of the peak and Interstate 70 runs along the western base of the peak. Precipitation runoff from the mountain's west slope drains into Tenmile Creek and the east slope drains to Miners Creek, which both empty into Dillon Reservoir. Topographic relief is significant as the summit rises 3,340 feet (1,018 m) above Tenmile Creek in one mile (1.6 km). The mountain's toponym has been officially adopted by the United States Board on Geographic Names, and has been recorded in publications since at least 1906.

== Climate ==
According to the Köppen climate classification system, Tenmile Peak is located in an alpine subarctic climate zone with cold, snowy winters, and cool to warm summers. Due to its altitude, it receives precipitation all year, as snow in winter, and as thunderstorms in summer, with a dry period in late spring.

== Gallery ==
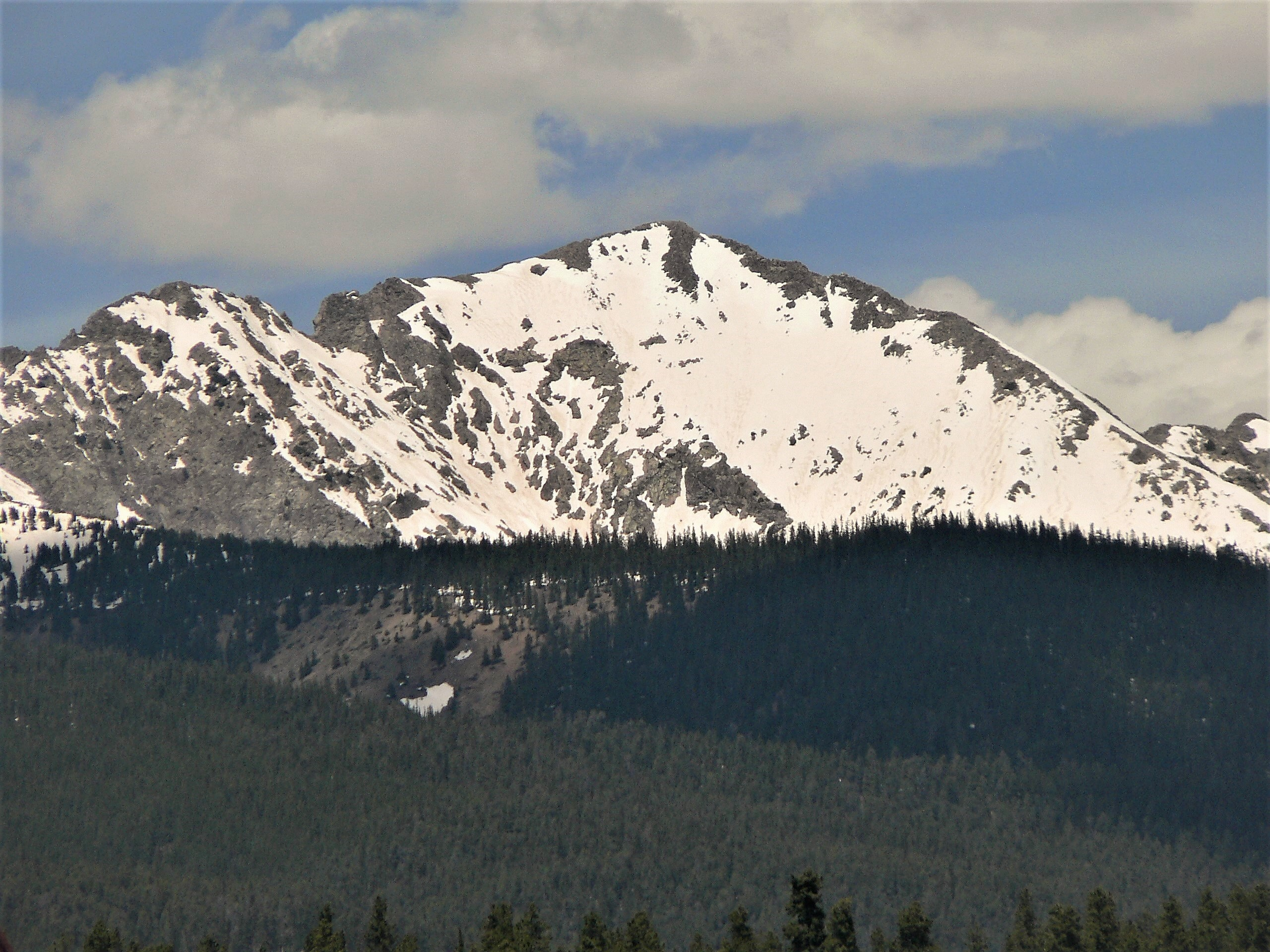
Southeast aspect viewed from Breckenridge

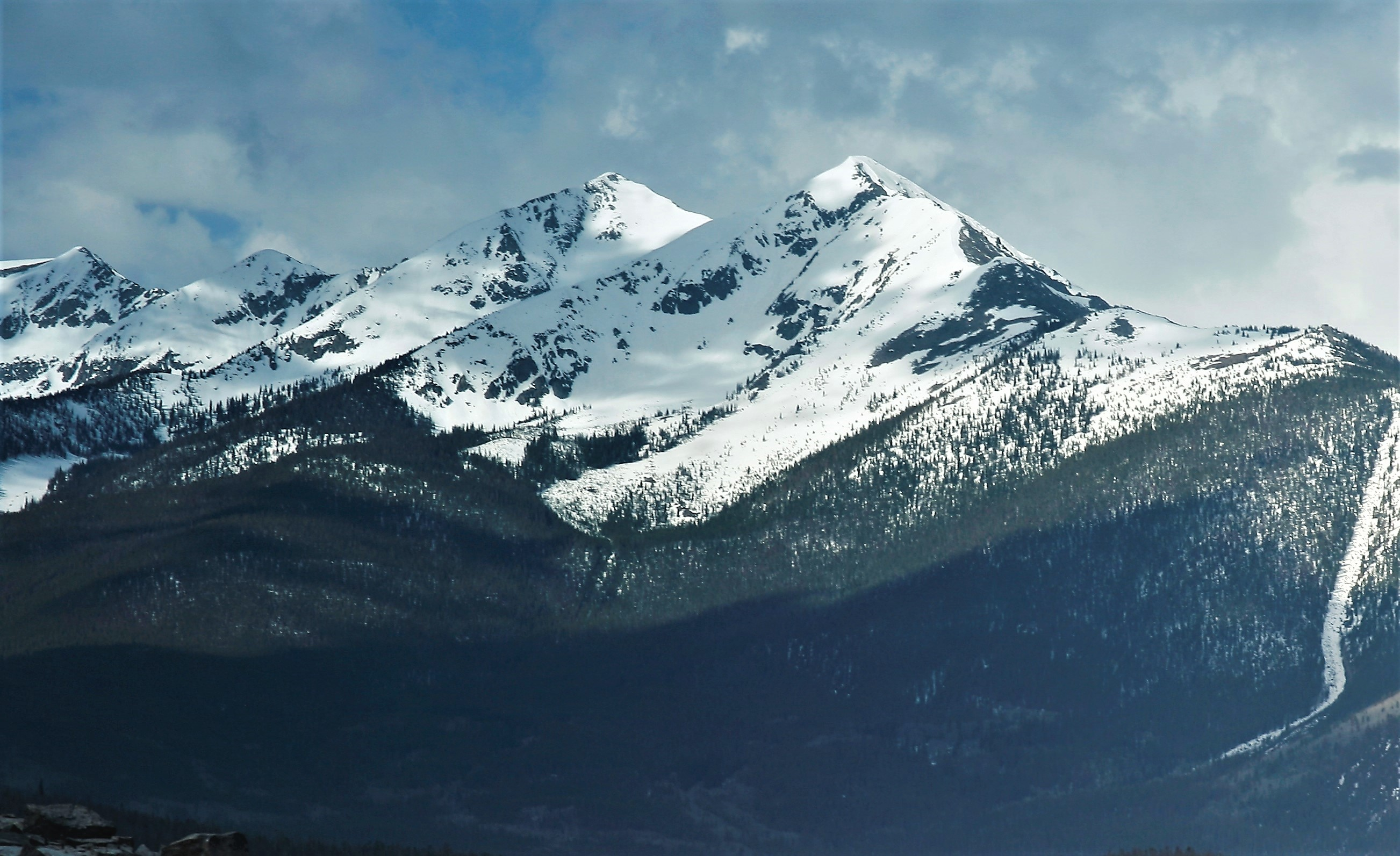
Tenmile Peak (left of center) and Peak One

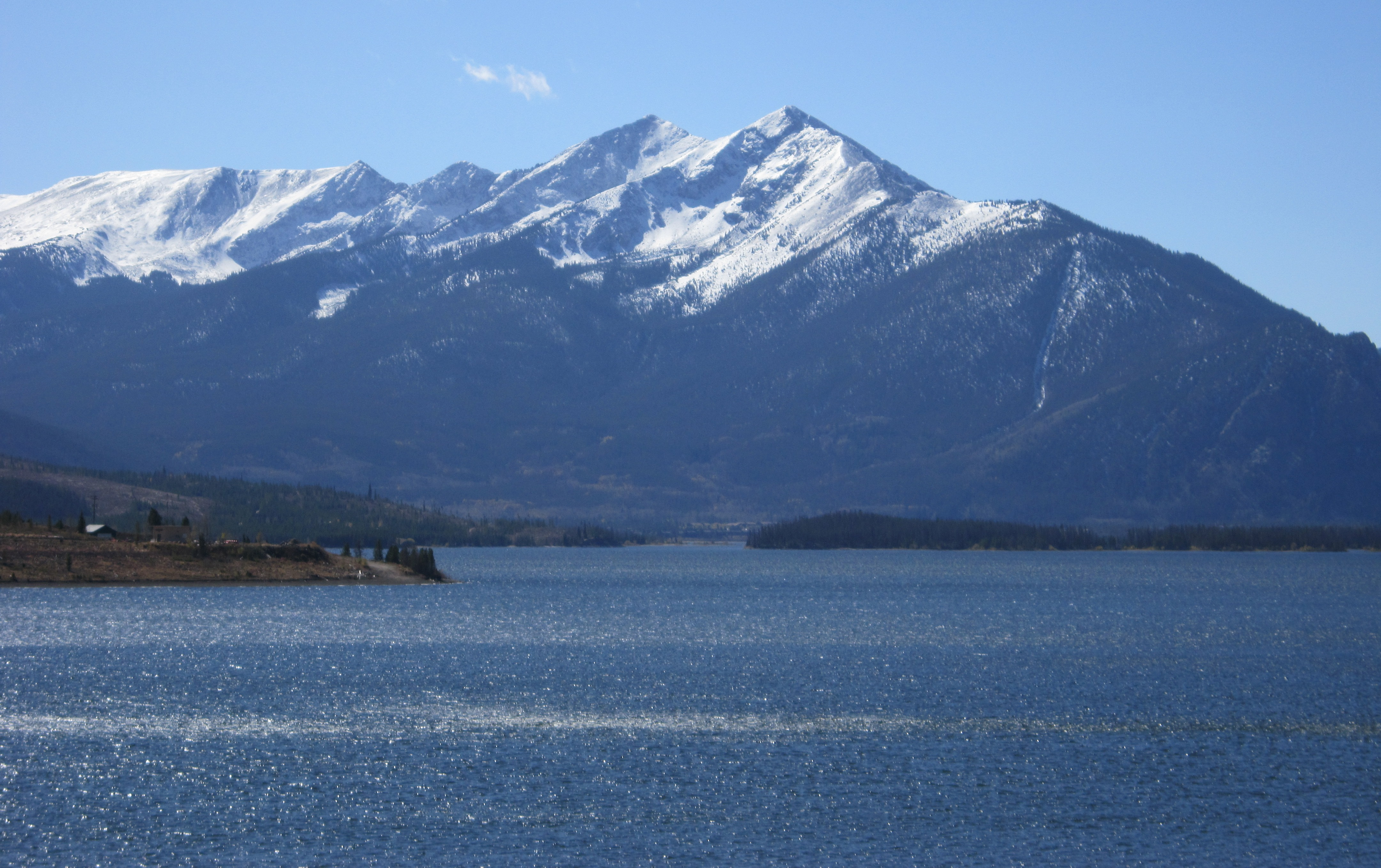
Tenmile Peak (center) and Peak One (right of center) centered beyond Dillon Reservoir

== See also ==
- List of mountain peaks of Colorado
