= Ten Mile Lake =

Ten Mile Lake or Tenmile Lake may refer to:

== Lakes ==
- Ten Mile Lake (Cass County, Minnesota)
- Tenmile Lake (Beltrami County, Minnesota)
- Ten Mile Lake, in Lac qui Parle County, Minnesota
- Tenmile Lake (Otter Tail County, Minnesota)
- Tenmile Lake (Oregon), in Coos County
- Ten Mile Lake (Nova Scotia), in Halifax Regional Municipality
- Ten Mile Lake (Great Northern Peninsula), on the Great Northern Peninsula of Newfoundland, Canada
- Ten Mile Lake (Eastern Newfoundland), in the eastern part of Newfoundland, Canada

== Other ==
- Ten Mile Lake Provincial Park, in British Columbia
- Ten Mile Lake Township, Lac qui Parle County, Minnesota
