= Peak One =

Mountain in the American state of Colorado

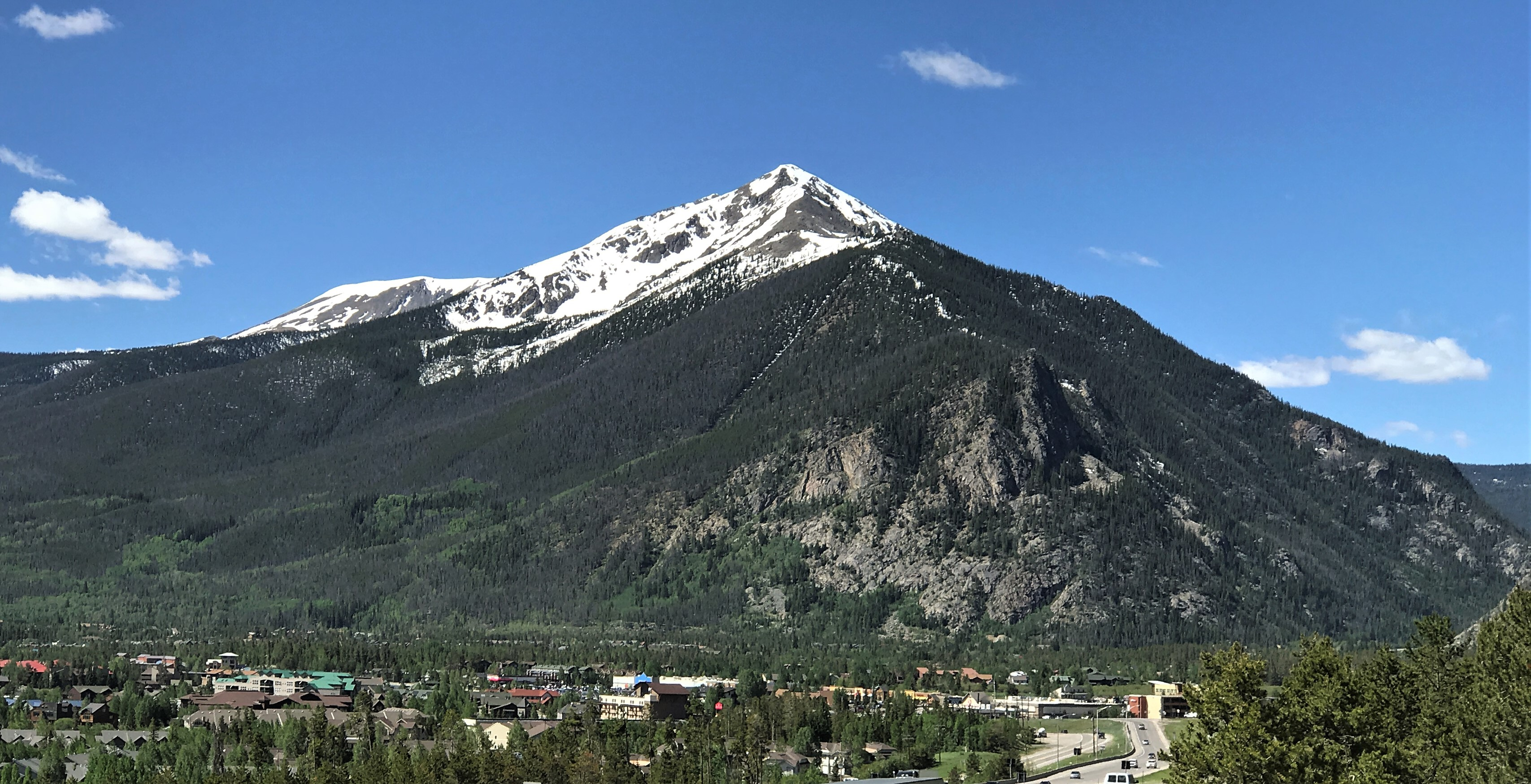
- North aspect of Peak One

Highest point
- Elevation: 12,805 ft (3,903 m)
- Prominence: 225 ft (69 m)
- Parent peak: Tenmile Peak (12,938 ft)
- Isolation: 0.49 mi (0.79 km)
- Coordinates: 39°32′35″N 106°07′12″W

Geography
- Location within Colorado Location within the United States
- Country: United States
- State: Colorado
- County: Summit County
- Parent range: Rocky Mountains; Tenmile Range
- Topo map: USGS Frisco

Geology
- Rock age: Precambrian
- Rock type: Metamorphic rock

Climbing
- Easiest route: class 2+

Peak One is a 12,805-foot (3,903 m) mountain summit in Summit County, Colorado, United States.

== Description ==
Peak One is set 15 miles (24 km) west of the Continental Divide at the northern end of the Tenmile Range which is a subrange of the Rocky Mountains. The mountain is located 2.5 miles (4.0 km) south of the community of Frisco, and is set on land managed by Arapaho National Forest. Interstate 70 runs along the western base of the peak. Precipitation runoff from the mountain's west slope drains into Tenmile Creek and the east slope drains to Miners Creek, which both empty into Dillon Reservoir. Topographic relief is significant as the summit rises 3,400 feet (1,036 m) above Tenmile Creek in one mile (1.6 km). The mountain's toponym has been officially adopted by the United States Board on Geographic Names in favor of rejected variant names such as "Peak 1", "Peak Number One", "Tenmile Range Peak 1", and "Melzer Peak."

== Climate ==
According to the Köppen climate classification system, Peak 1 is located in an alpine subarctic climate zone with cold, snowy winters, and cool to warm summers. Due to its altitude, it receives precipitation all year, as snow in winter and as thunderstorms in summer, with a dry period in late spring. The months of June through September offer the most favorable conditions for climbing Peak One.

== Gallery ==
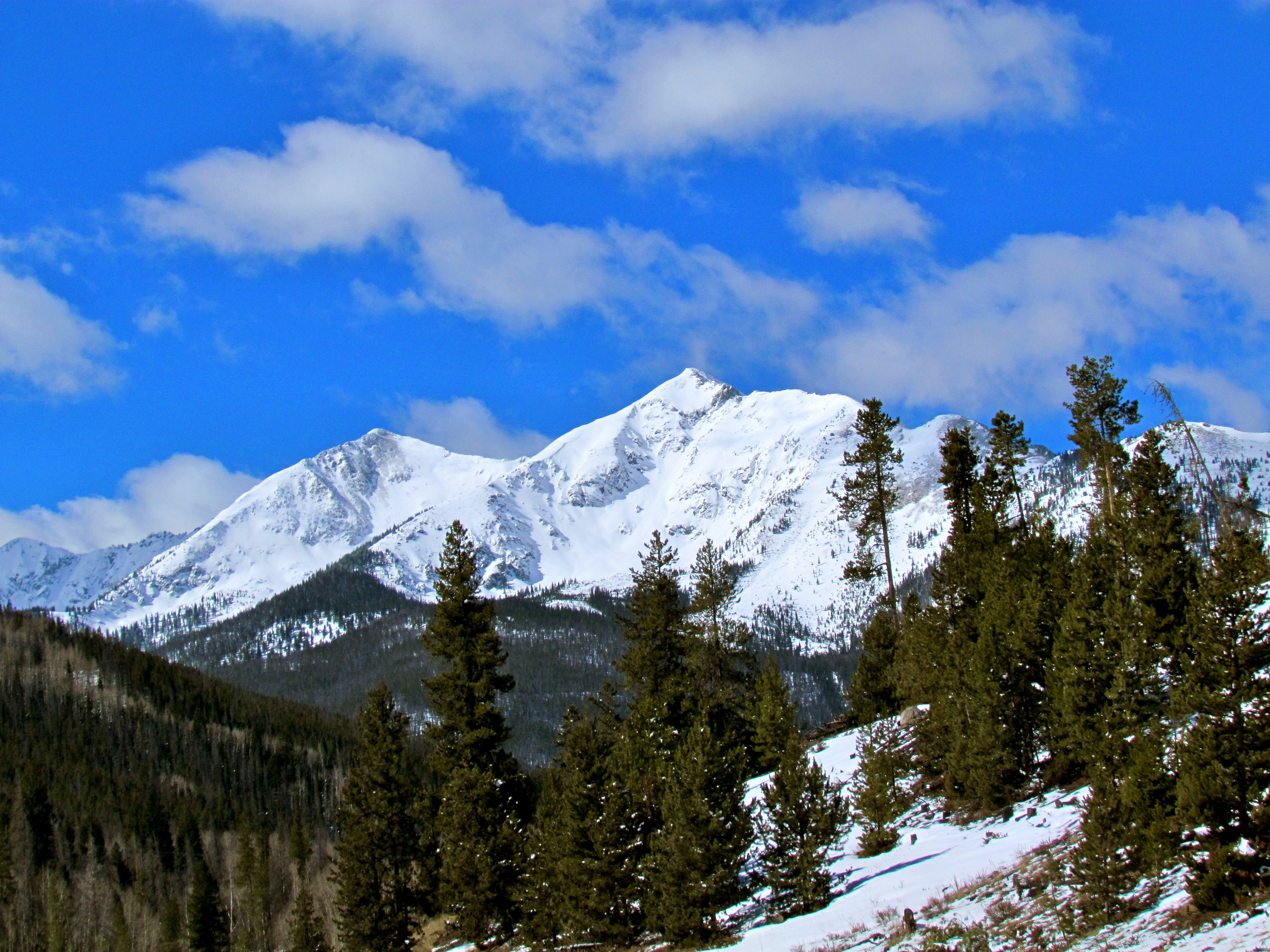
Peak One (centered) with Tenmile Peak to left

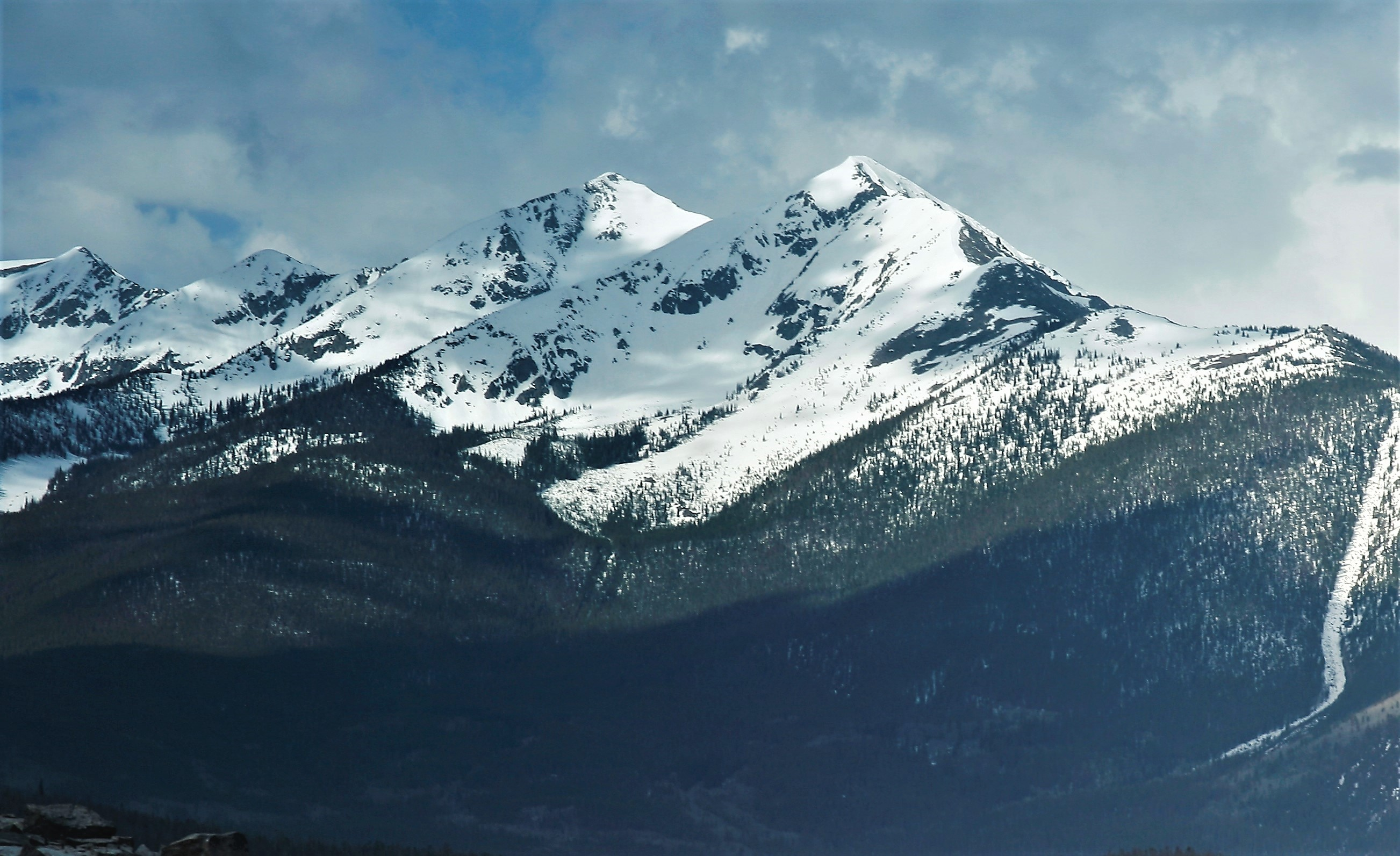
Tenmile Peak (left of center) and Peak 1

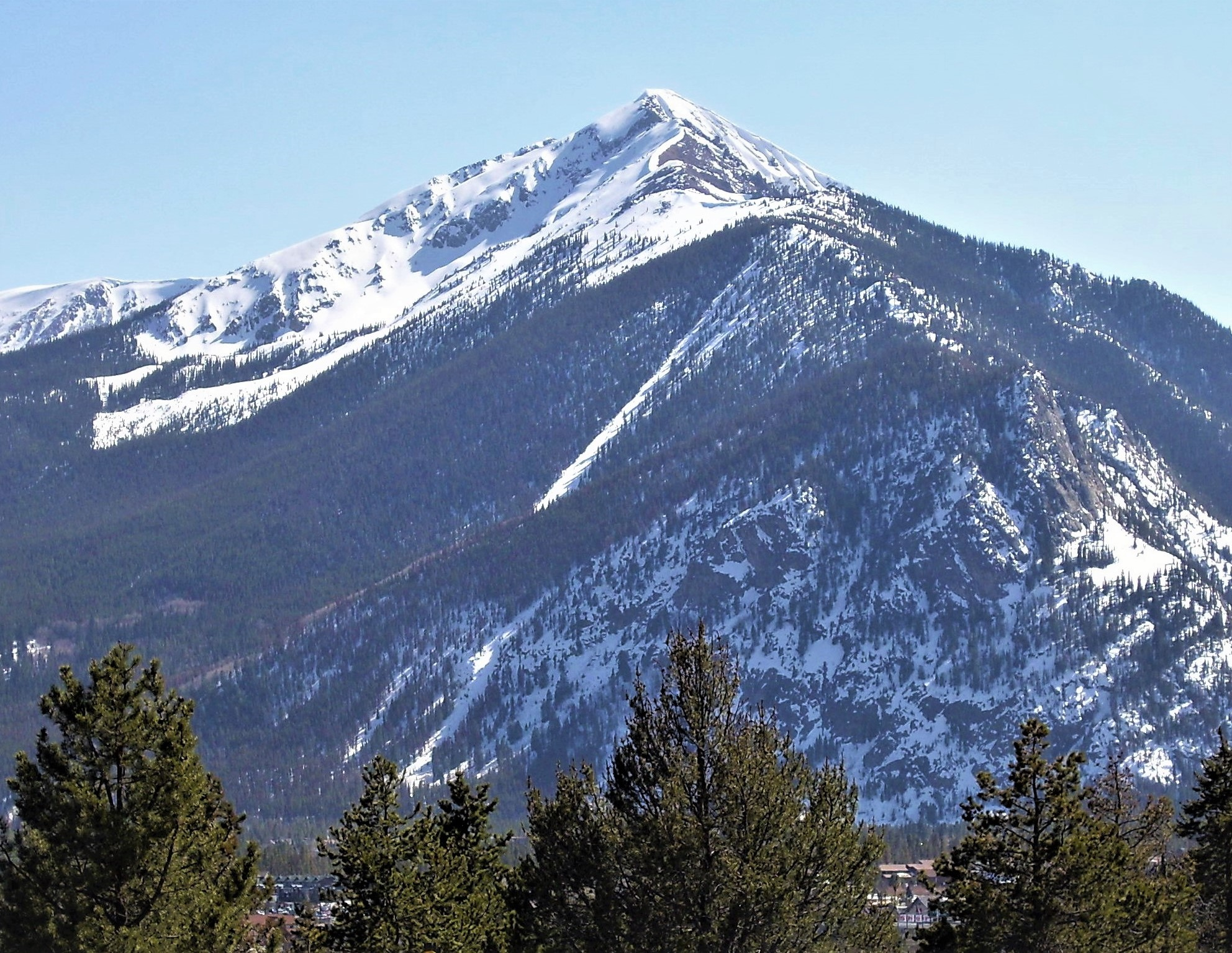
Peak One viewed from the scenic lookout near Frisco, CO.

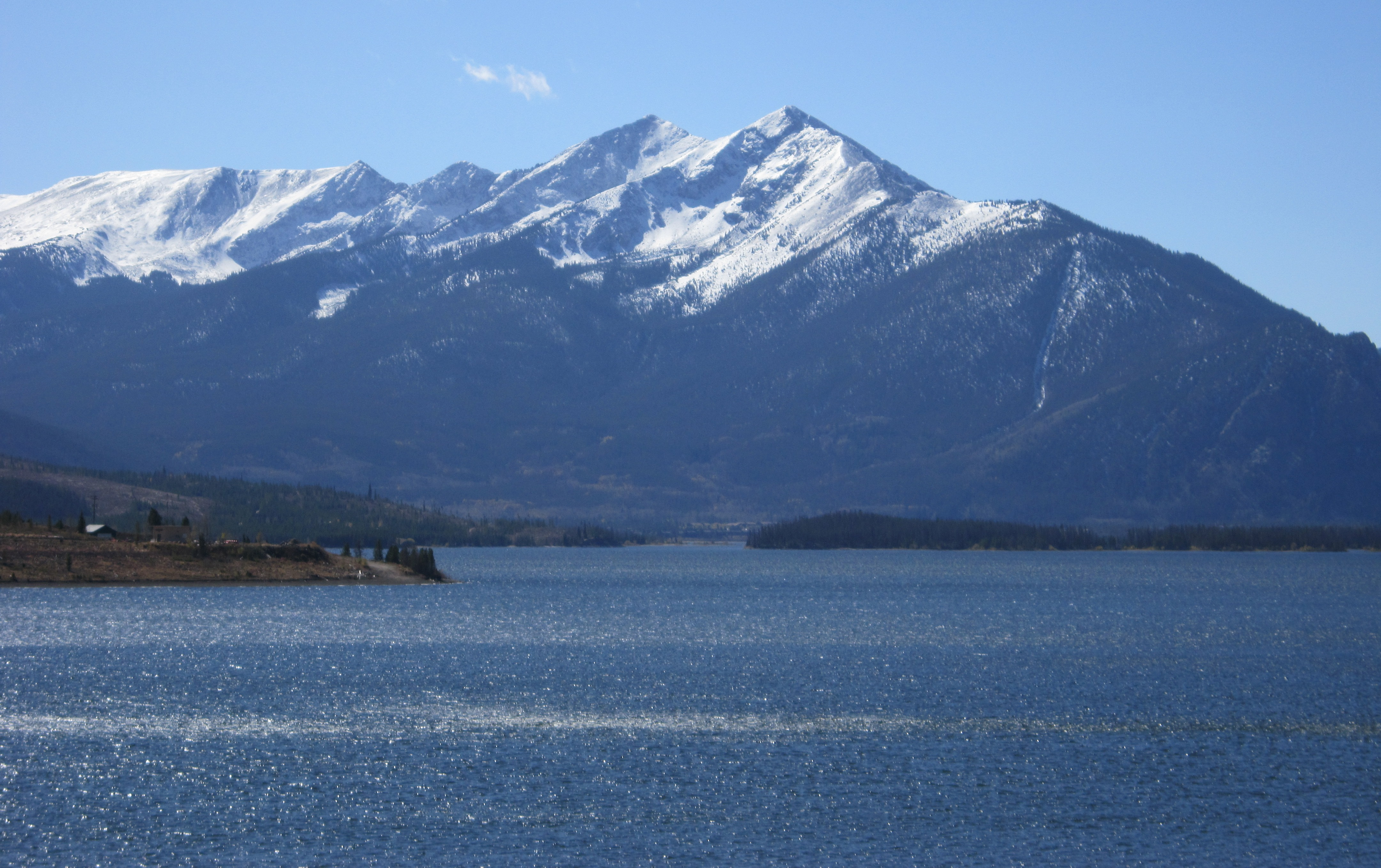
Tenmile Peak (center) and Peak 1 (right of center) beyond Dillon Reservoir

== See also ==
- List of mountain peaks of Colorado
