= Peak 10 (Tenmile Range) =

Mountain in the state of Colorado

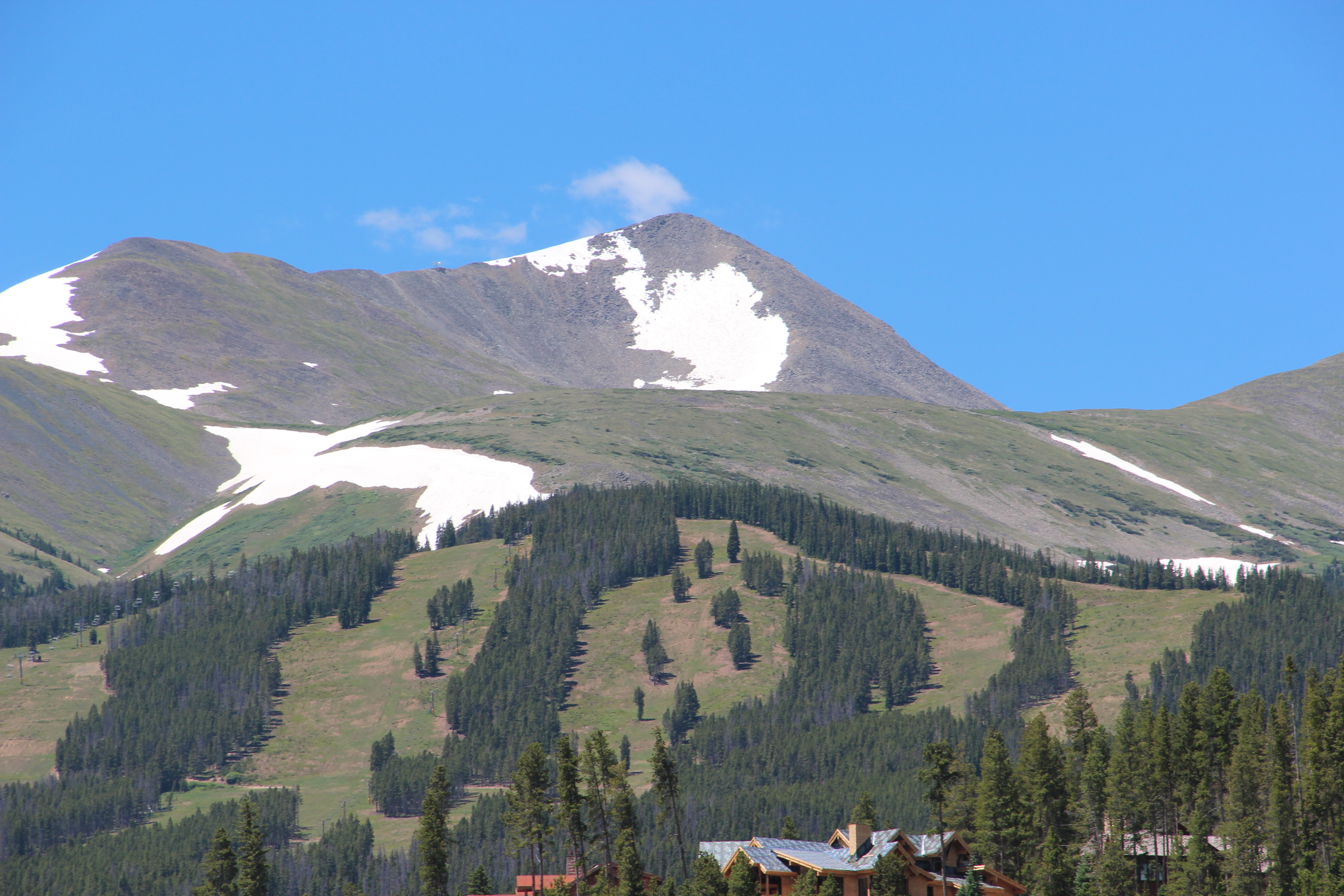
- Peak 10 viewed from Breckenridge in July 2016

Highest point
- Elevation: 13,640 ft (4,157 m)
- Prominence: 373 ft (114 m)
- Isolation: 0.87 mi (1.40 km)
- Coordinates: 39°26′35″N 106°06′10″W

Geography
- Location within Colorado
- Location: Summit County, Colorado, U.S.
- Parent range: Tenmile Range
- Topo map(s): USGS 7.5' topographic map Breckenridge, Colorado

Peak 10, elevation 13,640 ft (4,157 m), is a summit in the Tenmile Range of central Colorado. The peak is southwest of the town of Breckenridge in the Arapaho National Forest.

The lowest part of Peak 10 is serviced by Breckenridge Ski Resort's Falcon SuperChair. Backcountry skiing is also popular on the higher slopes of the mountain, especially in the summer when an annual ski event is held on the 4th of July.

== See also ==
- List of Colorado mountain ranges
- List of Colorado mountain summits
  - List of Colorado fourteeners
  - List of Colorado 4000 meter prominent summits
  - List of the most prominent summits of Colorado
- List of Colorado county high points
