= Fletcher Mountain =

Mountain in Colorado, United States

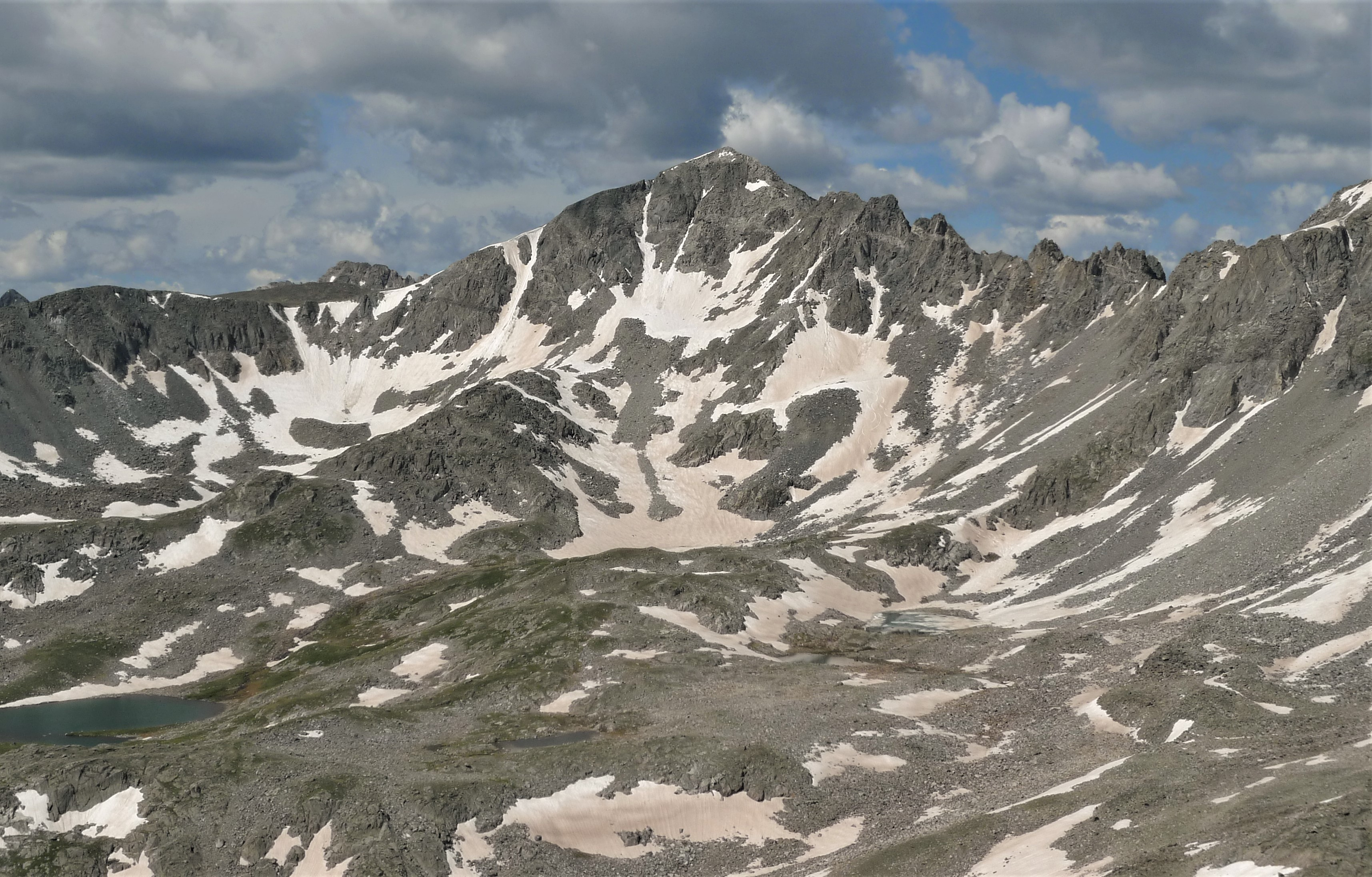
- Northeast aspect

Highest point
- Elevation: 13,958 ft (4,254 m)
- Prominence: 611 ft (186 m)
- Parent peak: Quandary Peak
- Isolation: 1.27 mi (2.04 km)
- Coordinates: 39°24′12″N 106°07′44″W

Geography
- Location within Colorado
- Location: Summit County, Colorado, U.S.
- Parent range: Mosquito Range, Tenmile Range
- Topo map(s): USGS 7.5' topographic map Copper Mountain, Colorado

Fletcher Mountain is a high mountain summit in the Tenmile Range of the Rocky Mountains of North America. The 13,958-foot (4,254 m) thirteener is located in Arapaho National Forest, 8.1 miles (13.0 km) southwest by south (bearing 215°) of the Town of Breckenridge in Summit County, Colorado, United States.

== Climate ==
According to the Köppen climate classification system, Fletcher Mountain is located in an alpine subarctic climate zone with cold, snowy winters, and cool to warm summers. Due to its altitude, it receives precipitation all year, as snow in winter, and as thunderstorms in summer, with a dry period in late spring.

== See also ==
- List of Colorado mountain ranges
- List of Colorado mountain summits
  - List of Colorado fourteeners
  - List of Colorado 4000 meter prominent summits
  - List of the most prominent summits of Colorado
- List of Colorado county high points
