= Ten Mile River =

Ten Mile River or Tenmile River may refer to:

== Rivers ==
- Ten Mile River (California), in northern California
- Ten Mile River (Housatonic River), in New York and western Connecticut
- Tenmile River (Maine), a tributary of the Saco River
- Ten Mile River (Seekonk River), in central Massachusetts and Rhode Island
- Tenmile Wash, in Arizona

== Other ==
- Ten Mile River Boy Scout Camp, overlooking the Delaware River in New York State
- Tenmile River (Metro-North station), in Amenia, New York

== See also ==
- Tenmile Creek (disambiguation)
- Ten Mile Run (disambiguation)
