= Breckenridge Ski Resort =

Alpine ski resort in Colorado

Breckenridge

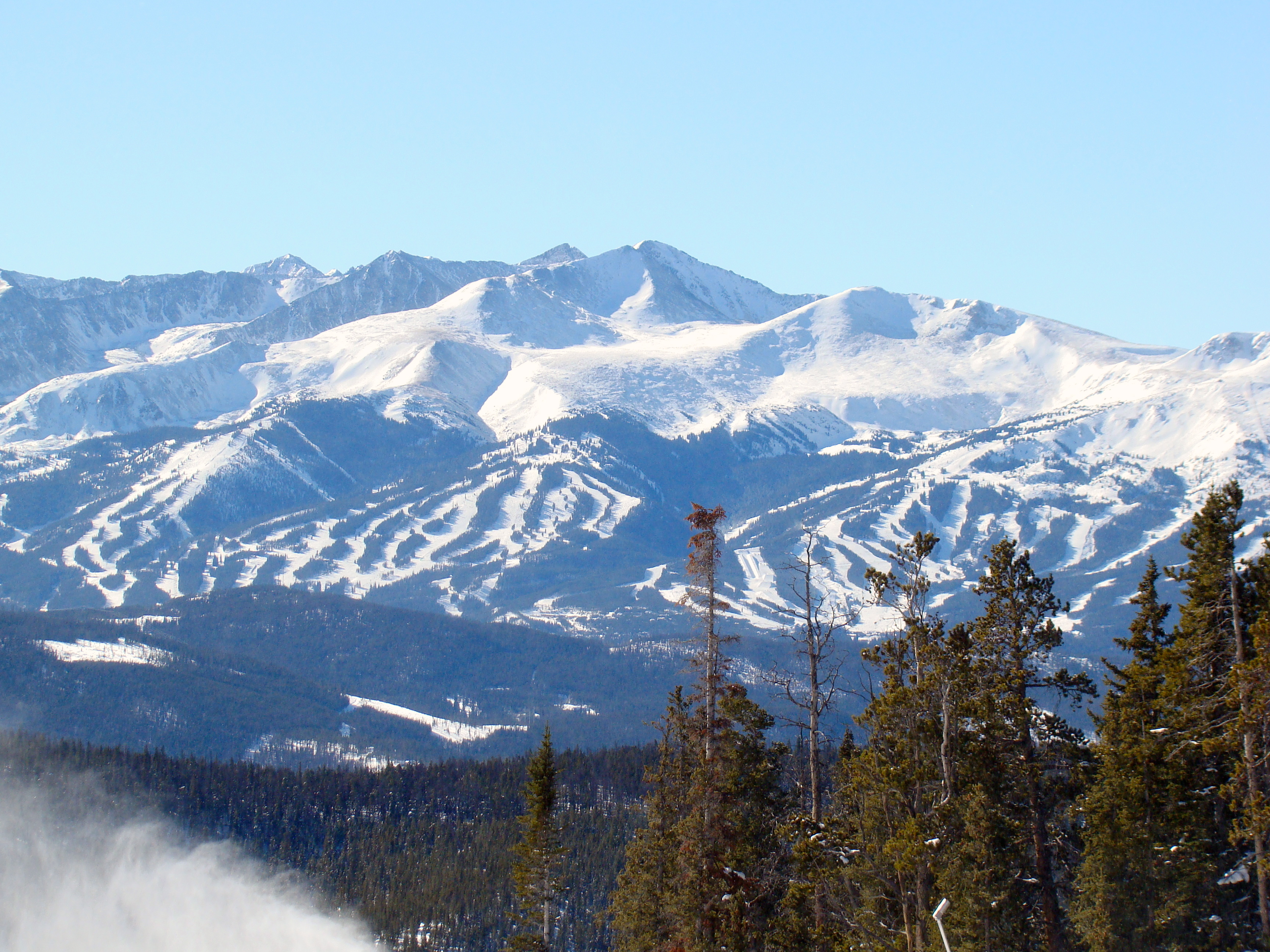
- Peaks 8, 9 and 10 viewed from Dercum Mountain at Keystone Resort

- Location in Colorado Breckenridge (the United States)
- Location: White River National Forest; Summit County, Colorado
- Nearest city: Breckenridge
- Coordinates: 39.480°N 106.067°W
- Status: Operating
- Owner: Vail Resorts
- Vertical: 3,398 feet (1,036 m)
- Top elevation: 12,998 feet (3,962 m)
- Base elevation: 9,600 feet (2,900 m)
- Skiable area: 2,908 acres (11.77 km^{2})
- Trails: 187 total: 14% beginner; 31% intermediate; 19% advanced; 36% expert
- Longest run: Four O'Clock; 3.5 miles (5.6 km)
- Lift system: 20 lifts (1 Gondola, 5 detachable six pack chairs, 8 detachable quad chairs, 1 fixed-grip quad chair, 1 fixed-grip triple chair, 4 fixed-grip double chairs); 15 surface lifts (4 bar lifts, 1 tow rope, 10 magic carpet lifts)
- Terrain parks: 25 acres (10 ha)
- Snowfall: 355 in (900 cm) per year
- Snowmaking: 600 acres (2.4 km^{2})
- Night skiing: none
- Website: breckenridge.com

Breckenridge Ski Resort is an alpine ski resort in the western United States, in Breckenridge, Colorado. Recognized for acres of skiable terrain across five mountain peaks, it welcomes thousands of skiers and snowboarders each season. Just west of the Continental Divide in Summit County, with a base elevation of 9,600 feet, and spanning 2,908 acres, it is perennially one of the most visited ski resorts in the Western Hemisphere. Breckenridge is owned and operated by Vail Resorts, Inc.

== History ==
=== 1960s ===
The mountain first opened on December 16, 1961, consisting of trails on Peak 8 serviced currently by the Colorado SuperChair. The main lift was a Heron double chairlift, Lift 1, which had a midway unloading station. Lift 1 ran from the base area up to a point slightly west of the top of the current Colorado SuperChair. This small butte overlooks the Rocky Mountain SuperChair and is accessible by hiking from the Vista Haus along a short dirt road in the summer.

A year later, a Constam double chairlift was installed up the double-black trail Mach One. The lift, later numbered Lift 3, ran from near the present-day Peak 8 SuperConnect's midway load station up to near the top of Lift 5.

In 1965, Lift 1 was supplemented by Lift 2, a Heron double chairlift constructed to serve the south part of Peak 8. A base lodge was also opened on Peak 8, but it was destroyed in an explosion (suspected to be caused by a gas leak) shortly after completion. Breckenridge expanded into high alpine terrain with the construction of a platter lift from near the top of Lift 2 to near the top of the current Lift 6 in 1967.

=== 1970s ===
In 1970, Breckenridge was purchased by the Aspen Skiing Company. From 1970 to 1978, the resort expanded onto Peak 9, opening four Riblet double chairlifts (Lift 4 on Peak 8, Lifts B, C, and D on Peak 9) and one triple chairlift (Lift A). Lift A serviced beginner terrain, while Lift C services trails on the north part of the main Peak 9 face. Lift D ran from near the bottom of the Beaver Run SuperChair to near the top of the EpicMix course on Sundown. Lift B ran alongside Cashier, running from the top of the Quicksilver Quad and offloading at the top of the Mercury SuperChair. In 1979, Lift 6 replaced the Peak 8 platter lift. Also in 1979, an alpine slide was constructed on Peak 8 under Lift 5. The slide is composed of three fiberglass tubes - Lanes "A", "B", and "C". "A" and "B" are for slower and inexperienced riders and run parallel to each other. Lane "C" is for solo, more experienced riders, and follows a significantly different alignment from the other two lanes, with a different arrangement of turns, including the presence of a triple-down drop and one more steep straightaway drop. The Alpine slide has mostly been unchanged since construction, the only alteration being a redesign of the lower section of the layout for both tracks as part of One Ski Hill Place construction in 2009.

=== 1980s ===
Breckenridge and other ski resorts faced a severe drought in the winter of 1980-1981 and installed snowmaking systems the following year. In 1981, Breckenridge installed the world's first high speed detachable quad chairlift, the Quicksilver Quad running from the Village base area to near the bottom of Lift B. The lift was constructed by Doppelmayr.

In 1983, Riblet constructed Lift E, a double chairlift servicing the north-facing chutes on Peak 9.

In 1984, Doppelmayr constructed the T-Bar, providing access to most of Peak 8's bowl terrain.

In 1985, Breckenridge expanded south on to Peak 10, with the opening of Lift F, a Poma fixed grip quad. A year later, it was upgraded to a high speed quad and renamed the Falcon SuperChair. Runs on Peak 10 were named by mountain manager Jim Gill after World War II planes, like Crystal, Cimarron, Doublejack and Mustang. Also in 1986, another high speed quad named the Colorado SuperChair was built by Poma on Peak 8, replacing Lift 1. The replacement lift ran a different alignment from its predecessor, running up the south side of Spruce and ending at the Vista Haus. With the addition of both the Colorado SuperChair and the Falcon SuperChair, each open peak had one high speed quad on it. All chairlifts built at Breckenridge since these two lifts have been built by Poma and its successor Leitner-Poma.

In the 1987-1988 ski season, Breckenridge topped one million skier visits, as it was sold to Victoria Ltd of Tokyo. Local residents supported the change in ownership, as some believed that the Aspen Skiing Company was exploiting revenue from Breckenridge to support its own four ski areas. Despite Aspen's withdrawal of ownership, some trail signs from this era remained scattered around Peaks 9 and 10 well into the 2010s.

=== 1990s ===
In 1990, Peak 9 received its second high speed quad when Poma built the Beaver Run SuperChair, which replaced Lift D and provided top-to-bottom lift service on Peak 9. It is the longest operating lift on the mountain (1.7 miles), and also has the largest vertical drop of any chairlift on the mountain (1,600 feet). A few of Lift D's towers were repurposed as a lift evacuation training area, located just uphill from where the Beaver Run SuperChair crosses under the Peak 8 SuperConnect.

In 1993, Breckenridge was purchased by Ralston-Purina, which already owned Keystone Resort and Arapahoe Basin. The three ski resorts logged a combined 2.6 million skier visits.

Breckenridge and Keystone were purchased by Vail Resorts in 1996, joining the company's other ski areas of Beaver Creek and Vail Ski Resort. Also in 1996, Poma constructed the Snowflake double chairlift, providing mountain access for a number of condominium developments off of Four O'Clock Road. The lift has a midway load partway up that provides access from Peak 9 to Peak 8 as an alternative route to the Peak 8 SuperConnect. The highlight of the lift is a complex 45 degree turn just above the midway load station. As the lift runs clockwise, uphill chairs make a simple 45 degree turn, while downhill chairs must make two separate turns and a 315 degree clockwise turn, plus cross over themselves.

In 1997, two aging double chairlifts were removed and two new high speed quads were built. On Peak 9, Lift B was removed and replaced with the Mercury SuperChair. The replacement lift, while ending at the same place as Lift B, was built parallel to the Beaver Run SuperChair, originating just uphill from the bottom of Lift A to make it accessible from Peak 10, Ten Mile Station, and the north Peak 9 trails. The Mercury SuperChair is not the first lift on Peak 9 to use this name, as the name was previously used on the Beaver Run SuperChair before 1993. On Peak 8, the Rocky Mountain SuperChair was built in anticipation of further expansion north onto Peaks 7 and 6. For the first five years of operations, it served to provide easier access from Peak 8 base to the T-Bar and north Peak 8 trails without a lengthy traverse from the Colorado SuperChair. After the Peak 7 and Peak 6 expansions opened, the Rocky Mountain SuperChair became the primary way to travel from Peak 8 base area to both peaks. At the same time as the Rocky Mountain SuperChair's construction, Lift 2, which supplemented the Colorado SuperChair, was removed.

In 1998, Ten Mile Station opened at the bottom of the Falcon SuperChair, replacing the Falcon's Aerie restaurant at the top of Peak 10. The following year, Breckenridge installed their first high speed six pack to replace the original Quicksilver SuperChair. The original quad was relocated to Owl's Head resort in Quebec, where it operated until 2019. Quicksilver Super6 runs from the Village base area up the Silverthorne trail (to the south of Lift A) and ends at Ten Mile Station. Until the opening of the Disney Skyliner at Walt Disney World in 2019, it was the only double loading aerial lift in North America. The bottom terminal of the lift has two separate loading areas, with an automated switch piece of railing being utilized to direct every other chair to the second loading station. Coinciding with this was the addition of a midway unload station on Lift A near where it passes the top of Quicksilver Super6, allowing skier traffic to bail out early for access to Ten Mile Station.

=== 2000s ===
Breckenridge carried out a massive expansion and lift upgrade in 2002, the largest terrain expansion in Colorado that year. The project also entailed the construction of two new chairlifts. The main addition was the opening of a new pod of intermediate trails on Peak 7, to the north of Claimjumper. The terrain was serviced by the resort's second high speed six pack, named the Independence SuperChair. At a time when high speed six packs were still very rare, Breckenridge became the first ski resort in Colorado with more than one high speed six pack.

In addition to Peak 7, a new high speed quad was built to connect Peak 9 to Peak 8. The Peak 8 SuperConnect replaced Lift 4 and improved navigation between the two peaks. Prior to 2002, transitioning from Peak 9 to Peak 8 required going to the top of Peak 9 and taking a black trail called Shock or a blue run called Union to the bottom of Lift 4, or traveling to the Snowflake lift's midway load after 1996. It originates on Peak 9 at the junction of the trails Red Rover and Sundown (just down a hill from Lift A), crosses over the Beaver Run SuperChair and Lift C, runs to a midway load and turn station at Lift 4's loading station, then runs up Lift 4's line to end near the Vista Haus. To guarantee that chairs are available for people using the mid-station, a system of automatic loading gates was introduced. These gates open when the chairs are turning into the loading area and activate a sensor. During busy periods, the gates are programmed to send select chairs through the bottom terminal empty, to be filled by people loading at the midstation.

A big drawback of the Peak 8 alpine bowls from the beginning was that much of the terrain required taking a lengthy 45 minute hike from the top of the T-Bar up the ridge, rendering them inaccessible for the most part, as this meant people had to endure a hike in cold temperatures and strong winds in excess of 35 mph. In 2005, this problem was alleviated when Leitner-Poma constructed a new high speed quad, which outdid Loveland Ski Area's Chair 9 to become the highest operating chairlift in North America. Originating at the top of Lift 6 and topping out just below the summit of Peak 8 at 12,840 feet (3,910 m), the Imperial Express SuperChair services the Imperial Bowl and cut the 45 minute hike to a 3-minute lift ride. The T-Bar was retained, as it provides round-trip access to trails in the Contest Bowl and the area immediately north of it.

Construction of a new eight-person gondola was announced on March 12, 2006, meant to serve as a replacement to the ski area buses on Ski Hill Road, and in anticipation of future development at Peak 8 Base. In early 2007, the BreckConnect Gondola opened to the public, improving access from the town to Peak 8 base area. It originates at the transit center off of Park Avenue and Ski Hill Road, and runs up to a first midway turn station at Shock Hill, servicing a condominium development. From here, the gondola travels across the Cucumber Gulch preserve, to just below Peak 7, where it has a second turn terminal and station, servicing Peak 7 base area, the Independence SuperChair, Crystal Peak Lodge, and the Grand Lodge on Peak 7. The gondola then takes a final hop to reach Peak 8 base. The BreckConnect has an hourly capacity of 3,000 pph, and runs every day of winter operations, as well as every day of fun park operations in the summer. For the gondola's first two years of operation, the Peak 7 base area had not yet been developed, and the Peak 7 station merely functioned as a turn terminal.

In 2008, Breckenridge began developing Peak 8 and Peak 7, intending to make Peak 8 the mountain's central hub. This was noticeable in that beginning in 2008, the mountain started opening with Peak 8 first before opening Peak 9 in the early season. From 2008 to 2010, One Ski Hill Place was constructed at Peak 8 base, in between Lift 5 and Lift 7, on what used to be parking lots, and opened to the public in 2010. The lodge has a new food court facility and a cocktail lounge known as the T-Bar (not to be confused with the Peak 8 lift, which was later renamed the Horseshoe Bowl T-Bar). Also in 2008, a new base area opened on Peak 7 at the BreckConnect Gondola's second midstation. Two lodges, the Crystal Peak Lodge and Grand Lodge on Peak 7, anchor the base area. As part of construction, the Independence SuperChair was extended downhill, its bottom terminal now located between Crystal Peak Lodge and Grand Lodge's south building, necessitating the rerouting of Ski Hill Road.

=== 2010s ===
In November 2010, the GoldRunner Coaster was constructed in the woods adjacent to Lift 7. The alpine coaster runs winter and summer and supplements the fun park's activities.

The 2011–12 ski season marked the ski resort's 50th anniversary season, with the resort implementing a year-long celebration in honor of a half-century since the resort was founded on December 16, 1961.

While no new lifts were built in 2012, the Colorado SuperChair received new chairs, replacing the original chairs that had been used since the lift's original construction.

In 2013, Breckenridge carried out a massive expansion with the opening of a long-awaited 543 acre expansion onto Peak 6. The expansion was first conceived in 2005, but construction of it was delayed due to opposition from groups that alleged that the expansion would destroy lynx habitat. Peak 6 expanded the resort's in-bounds terrain by 23%, and was the first major lift-serviced expansion at a Colorado ski resort since the construction of the Independence SuperChair in 2002. A new fixed-grip quad and high speed six pack were built as part of the expansion: the quad, known as the Zendo Chair, originates on Peak 7 at the junction of Monte Cristo and Angel's Rest, and travels to the Horizon Warming Hut at 10,800 feet, and is the primary route to access Peak 6. To avoid crowding the Independence SuperChair, a new trail called the Peak 6 Parkway was opened on Peak 7 consisting of new trail segments linking Pioneer to Wirepatch and Wirepatch to Lincoln Meadows, allowing skier traffic from Peak 8 to directly access Zendo without going through Peak 7 base. From the Horizon hut, the six pack, known as the Kensho SuperChair, transports visitors above timberline to an altitude of 12,302 feet and provides access to intermediate bowl terrain. The new six pack is the second highest lift on the mountain, behind only the Imperial Express SuperChair. Trail and lift names on Peak 6 reflect a common theme of the resort's Peak 6 branding, "Awaken Your Sixth Sense". The choice of trail names was historic in that they were selected by way of a crowdsourced naming contest on the resort's Facebook page, the first time this had ever been done by a ski resort. Zendo and the Kensho SuperChair opened to skier traffic on December 25, 2013, expanding the resort to 2,908 acres spread across five peaks.

On March 29, 2013, Breckenridge announced that the resort had launched plans to completely re-imagine the Fun Park's summer activity offerings on the mountain as part of the Vail Resorts Epic Discovery summer program, launched in the summer of 2015. This includes the construction of several zip lines on Peak 8 and Peak 7. The first of these was the Ten Mile Flyer on Peak 8, constructed immediately adjacent to the GoldRunner Coaster's lift hill, and opened on January 22, 2014.

By 2014, the original Colorado SuperChair was beginning to show its age and had become a bottleneck for congestion. Consequently, for the 2014–2015 season, Leitner-Poma replaced it with what became the resort's fourth high speed six pack. The upgraded Colorado SuperChair increased the lift's uphill capacity from 2,800 people per hour to 3,600 people per hour, easing congestion on Peak 8, especially during the early season when it is the sole intermediate terrain lift open. It is the sole six pack on the mountain to use a conveyor loading belt, similar to ones utilized at many European ski resorts, which cuts down on stops and slows due to falls in the loading area. It is also the second lift on the mountain to have such a carpet belt, after Rip's Ride (also on Peak 8). Alongside the Colorado SuperChair, the replacement chairs installed on the original quad were relocated to the Beaver Run SuperChair to replace that lift's aging Competition chairs. The Peak 9 Restaurant at the top of Lift C was renovated and turned into a new facility known as the Overlook Restaurant, after the original owners' lease expired at the end of the 2013–2014 season.

For 2016, a new restaurant, Pioneer Crossing, was opened at the top of the Independence SuperChair, replacing a warming hut that had existed there since the opening of Peak 7.

For the 2017–2018 season, the Falcon SuperChair, at this point more than 30 years old, was upgraded to a high speed six pack by Leitner-Poma. With the upgrade, each of the five peaks has one high speed six pack on it.

=== 2020s ===
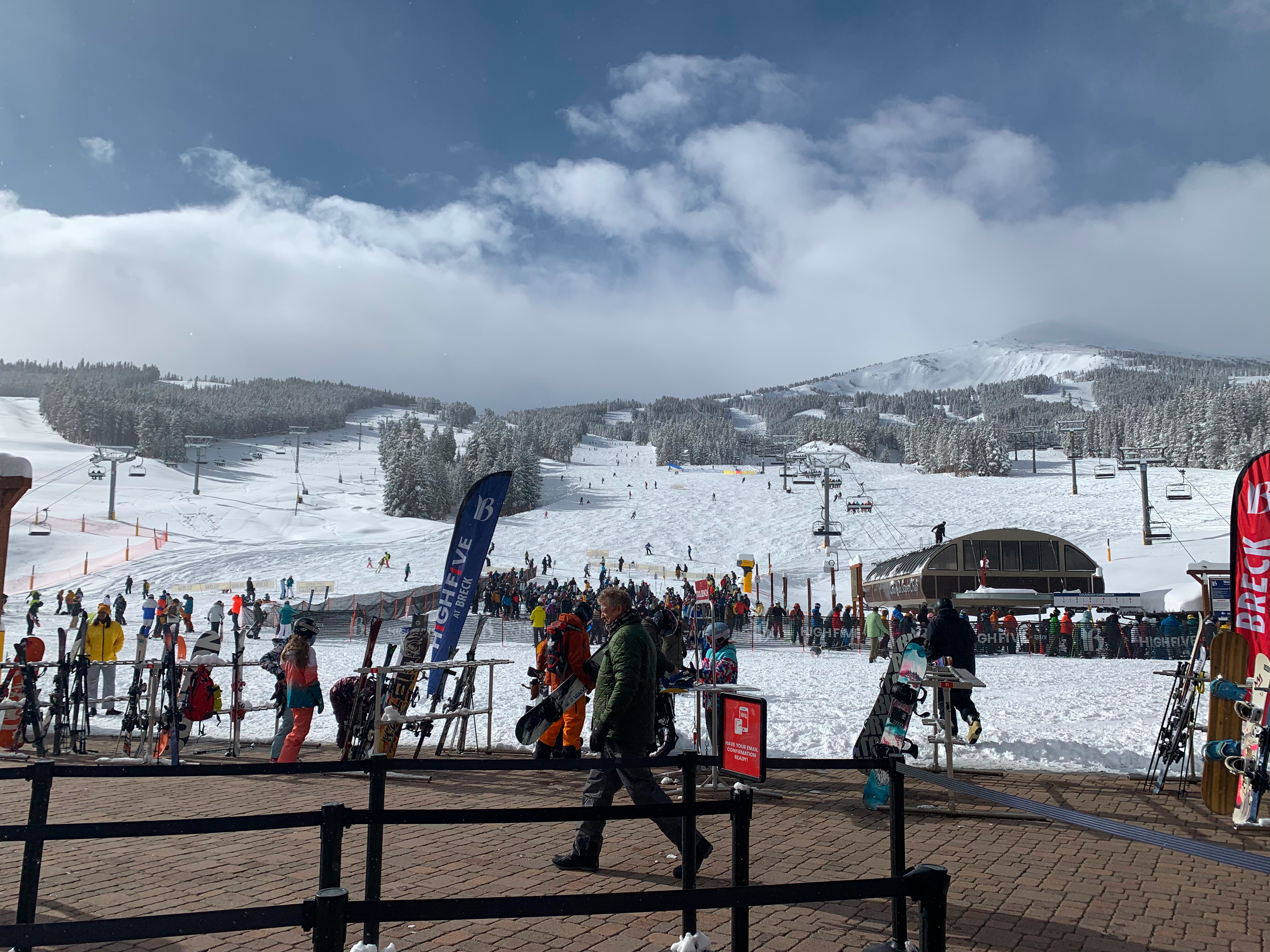
The Breckenridge Ski Resort as seen from the base in November 2024

For the 2021-2022 season, Leitner-Poma constructed a high speed quad servicing trails on the north side of Peak 7. The Freedom SuperChair supplemented the Independence SuperChair, while also creating a route bypassing the Peak 7 base area for skier traffic heading south from Peak 6 to Peak 8.

In the summer of 2023, Leitner-Poma replaced Lift 5 with a high speed quad, named Five Superchair. The original Lift 5 was over 50 years old, experienced frequent long wait times, and was prone to misloads due to its role as a beginner lift.

== Layout ==
Breckenridge is spread out across the five peaks that make up the southern half of the Tenmile Range. The peaks are numbered from southernmost (Peak 10) to northernmost (Peak 6) 'til 2012. Prior to development of Peak 6, directional trail signs between peaks were color coded: Peak 9, orange arrows, Peak 10 yellow, Peak 8 purple, Peak 7 red.

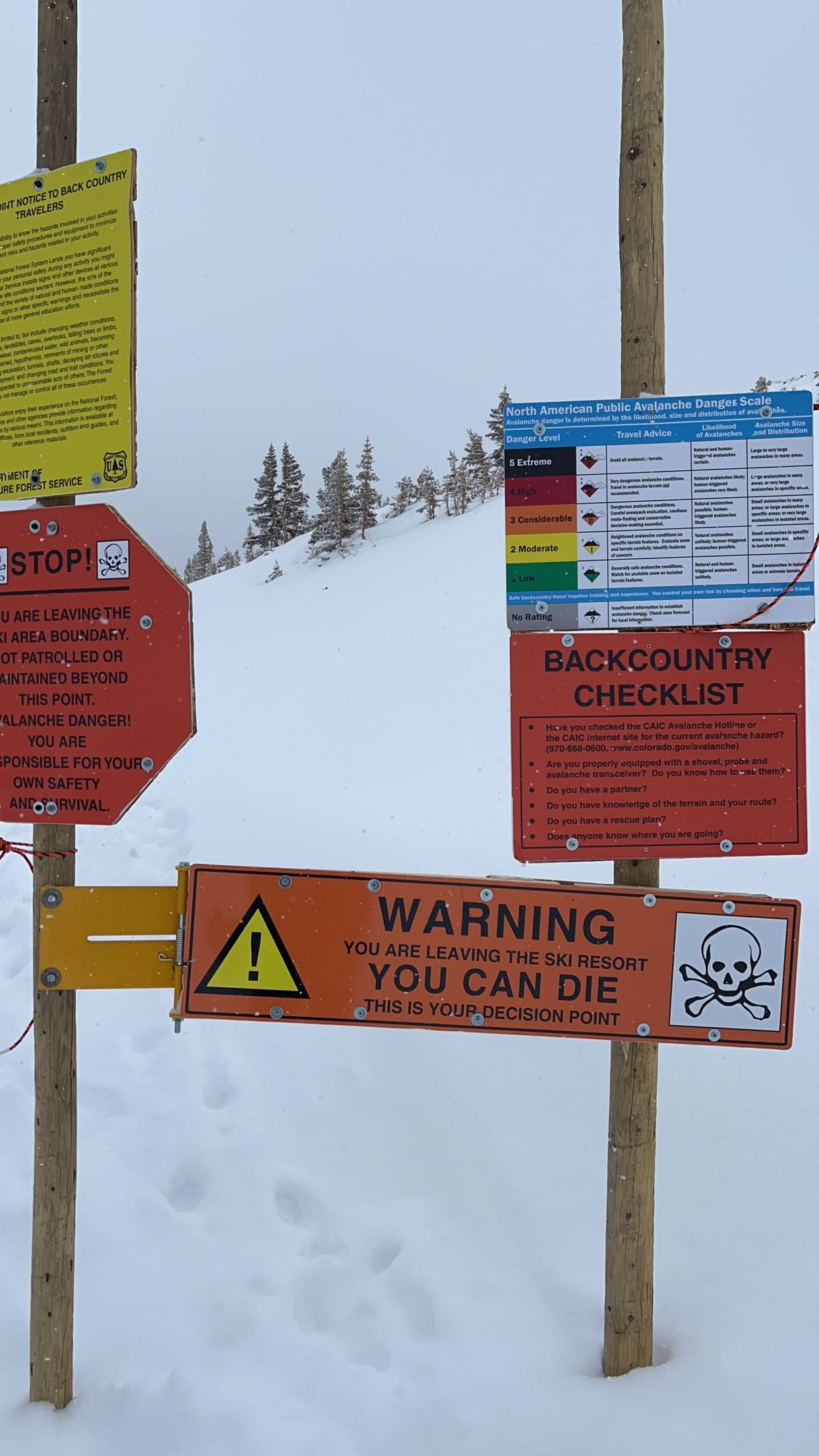
Backcountry skiing entrance sign

=== Peak 10 ===
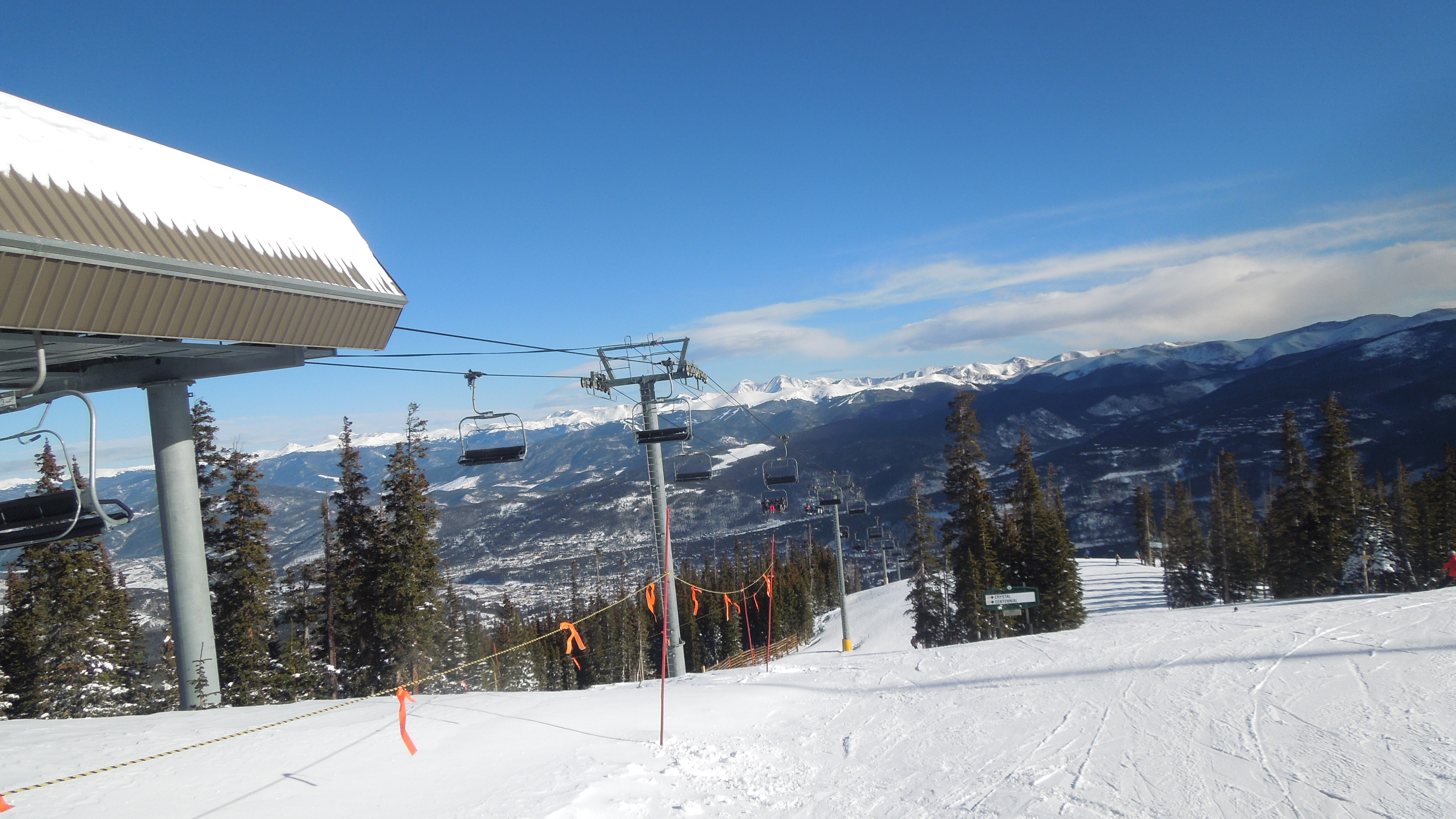
The Falcon SuperChair (replaced in 2017) services a variety of advanced trails, ranging from groomed blacks to glades on the north side and chutes on the south side

Peak 10 is the southernmost peak on the mountain. This is the "expert" side of the mountain containing only black and double black trails which are made accessible from the Falcon SuperChair. The speedy Falcon SuperChair allows skiers and snowboarders to gain a vertical rise of 1,404 ft./ 428 meters. The advanced terrain on Peak 10 varies, from groomers underneath and near the lift, to glades on the north side of the Peak 10 ridge, and double black chutes on the far south side. There are 15 different runs that the lift gives access to. 6 runs are double blacks toward the far left side and 9 are blacks on the other side. Due to the difficulty of the side of the mountain, the Falcon SuperChair rarely has a wait time longer than 5 minutes.

=== Peak 9 ===
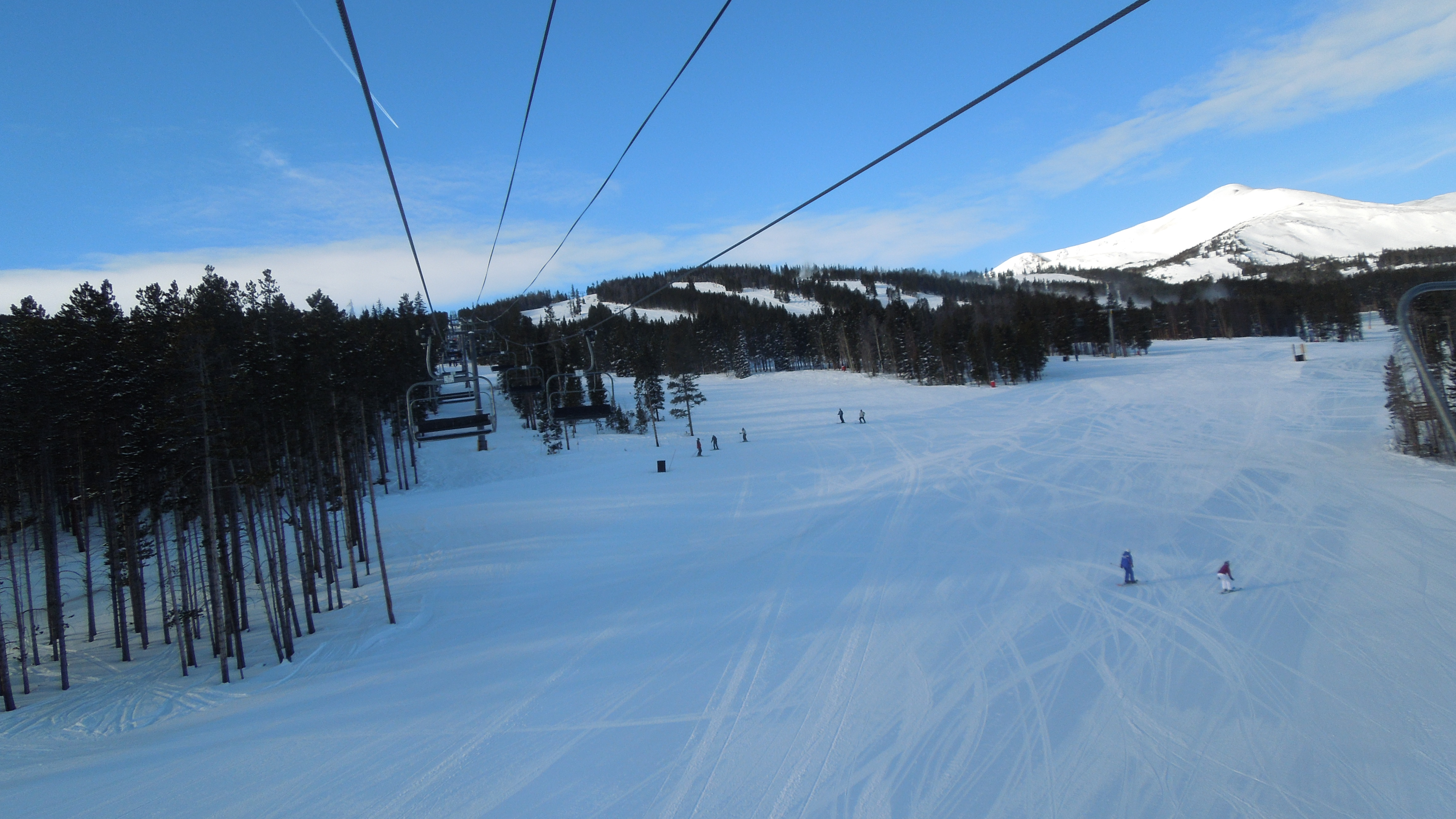
Peak 9 is composed of intermediate terrain, as well as beginner terrain on the lower slopes and chutes on the north face

The second oldest peak, the lower part of Peak 9 is a beginner learning slope, accessed by Quicksilver Super6 and Lift A. On the upper part of Peak 9 are intermediate blue runs serviced by the Mercury SuperChair, Beaver Run SuperChair, and Lift C. On the north side of Peak 9, facing towards Peak 8, are the North Chutes, double black-rated chutes serviced by E chair which also functions as an access lift to transition from Peak 8 to Peaks 9 and 10.

=== Peak 8 ===
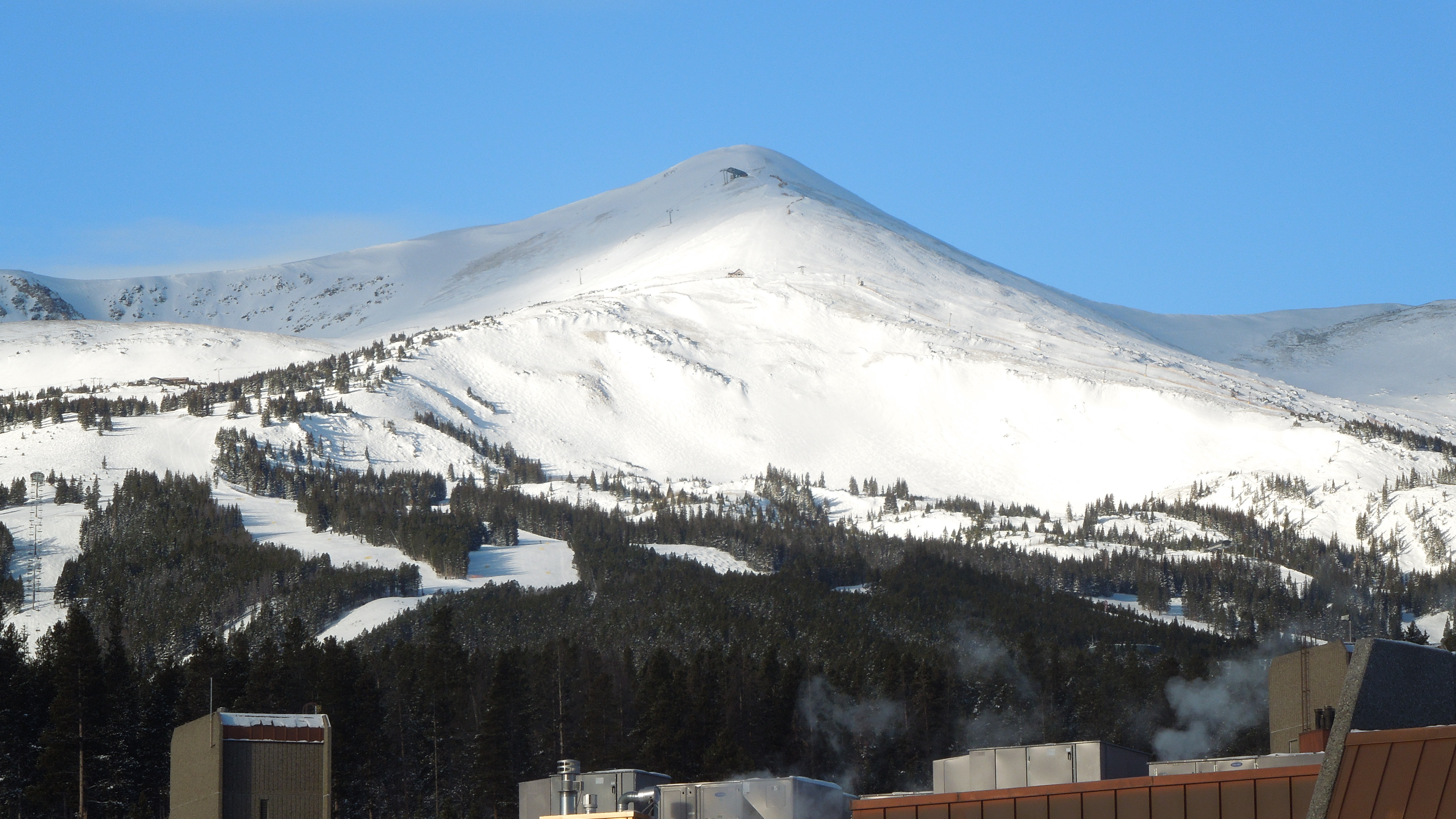
Peak 8 is the geographical center of the resort. It also has the widest variety of terrain, from beginner trails to steep bowl terrain

Lower Peak 8 is home to the base village of Breckenridge. It consists of beginner trails, as well as many intermediate trails mixed with some advanced runs. There are four lifts out of the base area: Rip's Ride lift which services a beginner learning area; 5 Chair, which services more advanced beginner terrain, the Freeway and Park Lane Terrain Parks, and the Alpine Slide. At the north end of the base area, the Colorado SuperChair provides access to the Vista Haus, central Peak 8, as well as access to the Peak 8 back bowls and Peak 9, while the Rocky Mountain SuperChair provides access to northern Peak 8, the T-Bar, Peak 7, and Peak 6 Via the Zendo quad chair. Peak 8 is home to some of the premier terrain parks in the country: the black diamond rated Freeway and blue Park Lane terrain parks. These are home to the 27-person Breck Pro Team, as well as numerous other extreme sports groups from around the world who use the parks to prepare for such events as The Dew Tour and X-Games.

The upper part of Peak 8, is composed of advanced and expert terrain. This area is made up of expert chutes, the lower part being accessed by the Peak 8 SuperConnect, while the upper part is accessed from 6-chair. Two lifts on Peak 8 go above tree-line: the T-Bar, accessible from the Rocky Mountain SuperChair, services northern Peak 8's chutes. The Imperial Express SuperChair, reachable from Lift 6, is the highest operating chairlift in the world and services the Imperial Bowl, the Lake Chutes, and access to the Peak 7 Bowl. The Lake Chutes present some the steepest terrain in the region, and are a series of daunting chutes with an incline of up to 55 degrees and running vertically for about 400 feet (120 m). Hiking from the top of the Imperial lift allows access to the summit of Peak 8 and a variety of cornices and chutes. It can get very windy and cold at the top, and in poor visibility conditions the peak may be closed.

=== Peak 7 ===
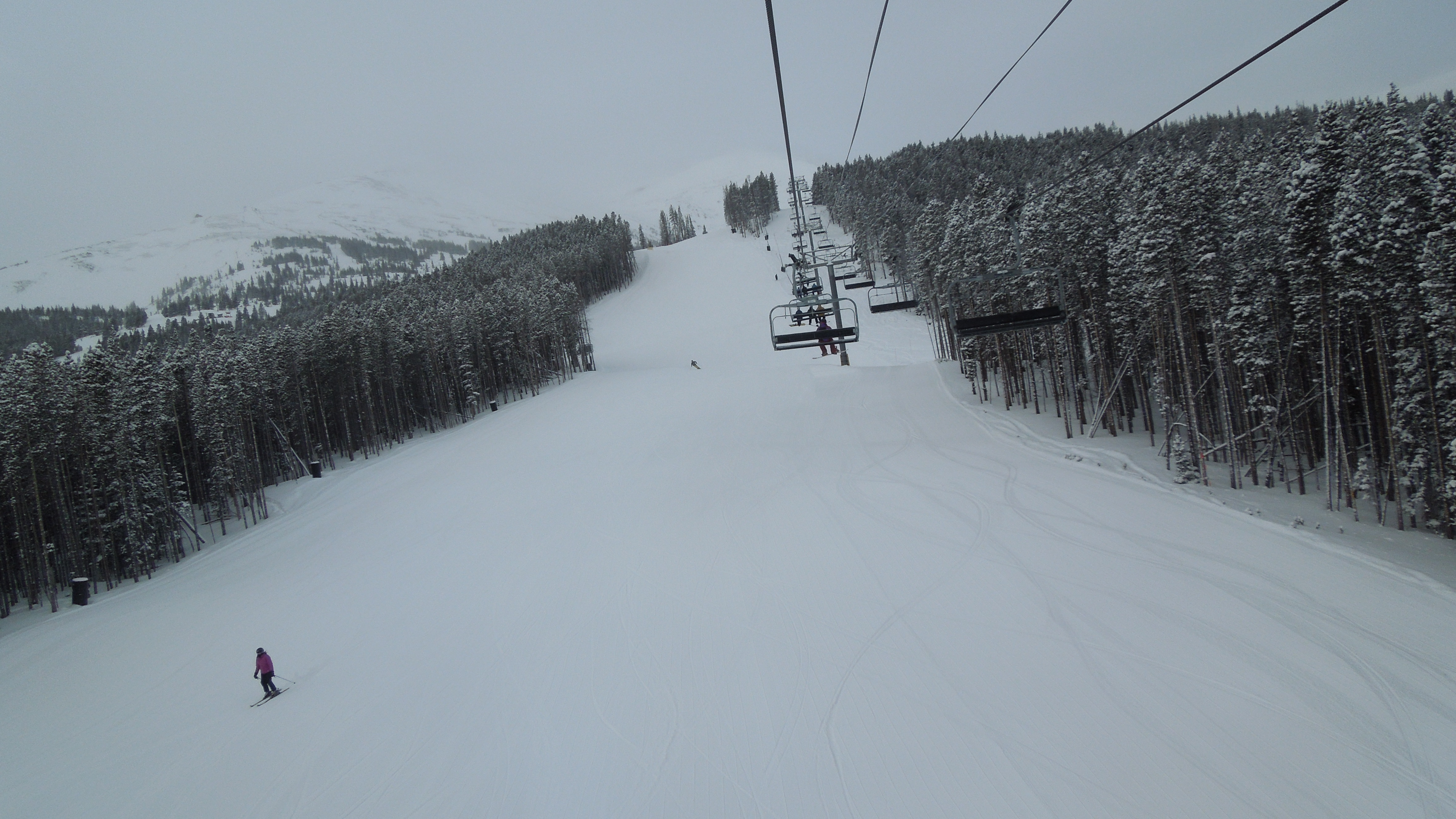
The Independence SuperChair services moderate intermediate terrain on the lower part of Peak 7

Peak 7's bowls are accessible by hiking from the T-Bar or a traverse from the top of the Imperial Express SuperChair. The lower part of Peak 7 is an area of rolling intermediate trails, groomed nightly. Peak 7's base area is composed of two large lodges, the Crystal Peak Lodge and the Grand Lodge on Peak 7, and is connected to town by one of two midway stations on the BreckConnect Gondola. The base area also has a restaurant, Sevens, opened in February 2009. Peak 7's terrain is serviced by the Independence and Freedom SuperChairs. The Zendo lift used to access Peak 6 also begins on Peak 7.

=== Peak 6 ===
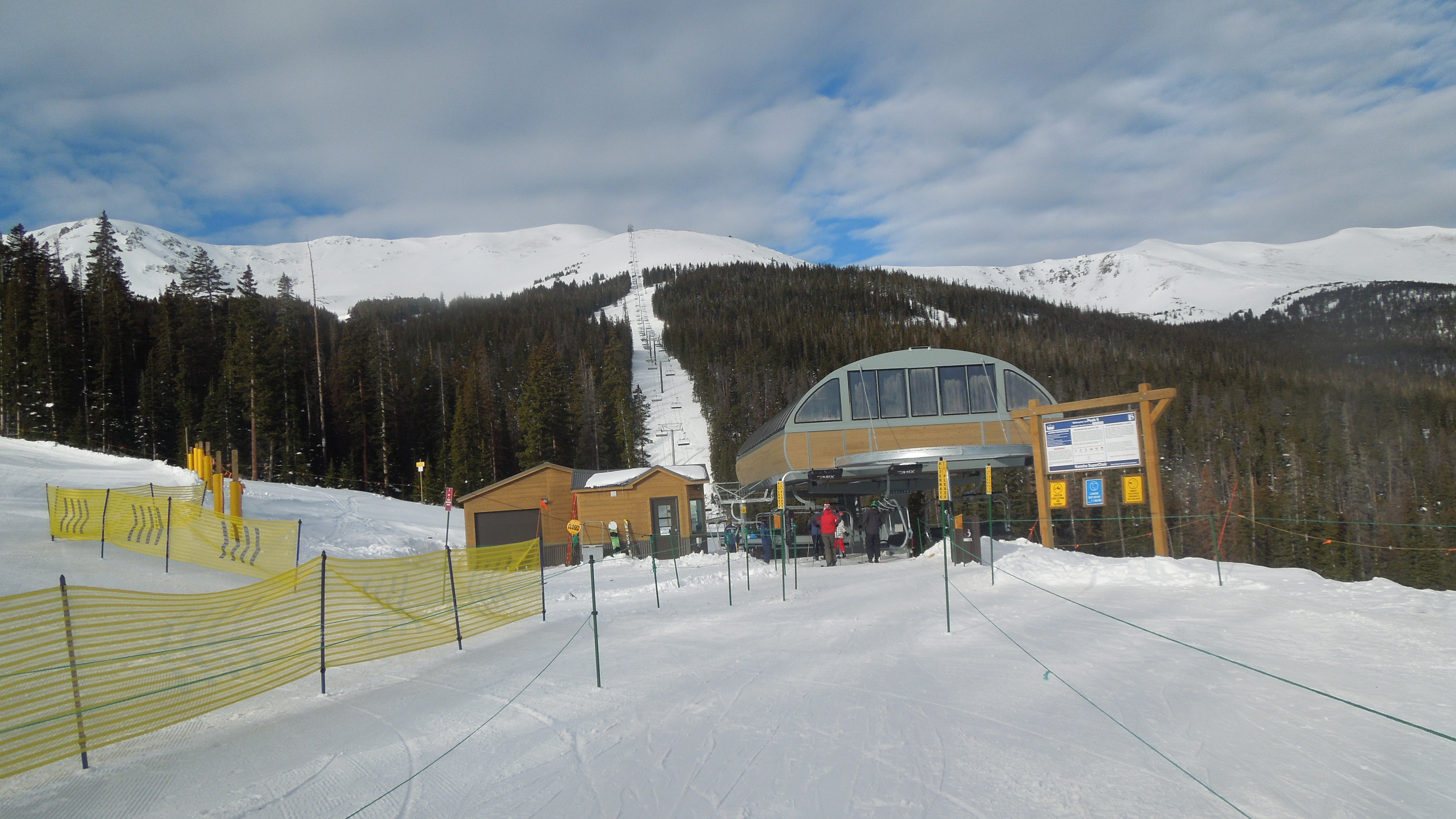
The Kensho SuperChair services high alpine intermediate and expert terrain on Peak 6.

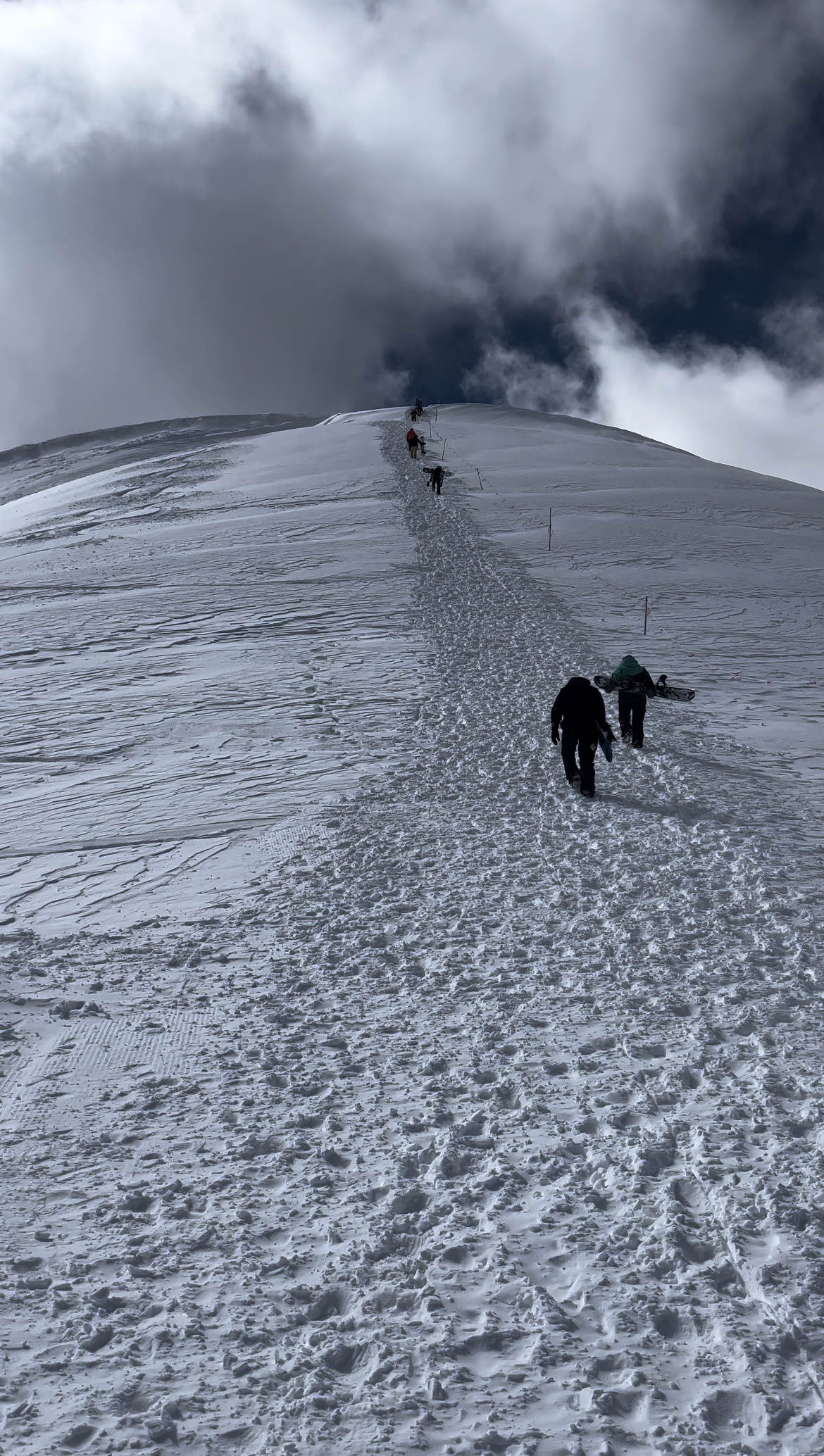
The hike to the top of Peak 6.

Peak 6 is primarily geared towards providing bowl terrain for intermediate skiers and riders, but also includes a large amount of advanced terrain and chutes. Access to Guests coming from Peak 7 can also use the Wanderlust trail from the Pioneer Restaurant at the top of the Independence SuperChair. From the Horizon warming hut, the Kensho SuperChair runs above timberline to an altitude of 12,302 feet, making it the world's highest elevation six pack and providing direct access to intermediate bowl trails, with further access to chutes in the Serenity Bowl (to the south) and Beyond Bowl (to the north) via a short hike from the top. The hike to the top of the mountain is directly in front of skiers and snowboarders when they get off of the Kensho SuperChair. The steep hike provides an additional incline of 217 feet. The hike is very difficult due to the lack of oxygen and vertical climb. It is often not open to public due to snow conditions that may cause avalanches. Once people get to the top they have the option of 15 different expert chutes.

=== Slope Aspects ===
- North: 20%
- South: 20%
- East: 60%
- West: 0%

== Lifts ==
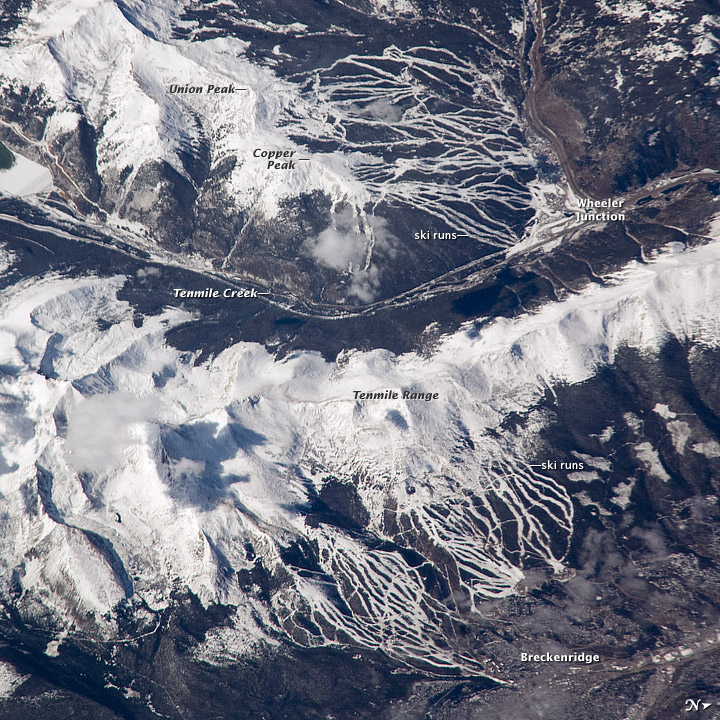
A view of Breckenridge (bottom) and Copper Mountain (top) with Colorado State Highway 91 in-between. Taken from the ISS on October 24, 2008.

As of 2025, Breckenridge has a total of 35 lifts. This includes 20 suspended lifts and 15 surface lifts. Breckenridge has one gondola lift, the BreckConnect Gondola, with a capacity of eight people. It has 19 chairlifts, including 5 six-packs, 9 quads (1 fixed-grip and 8 detachable), 1 triple, and 4 double lifts. It's 15 surface lifts including 4 bar lifts (with one of them, the Horseshoe Bowl T-Bar having a capacity of two instead of one), as well as a tow rope and 10 magic carpet lifts.

== Dew Tour ==
In December 2008, Breckenridge hosted the first Winter Dew Tour. Breckenridge continued to host the event annually in the second or third weekend in December. However in 2020, the Winter Dew Tour moved to Copper Mountain and occurred during the second weekend of February; with plans to continue the Tour at Copper Mountain for the next few years.
