= Crystal Peak (Tenmile Range) =

Mountain in Colorado, United States

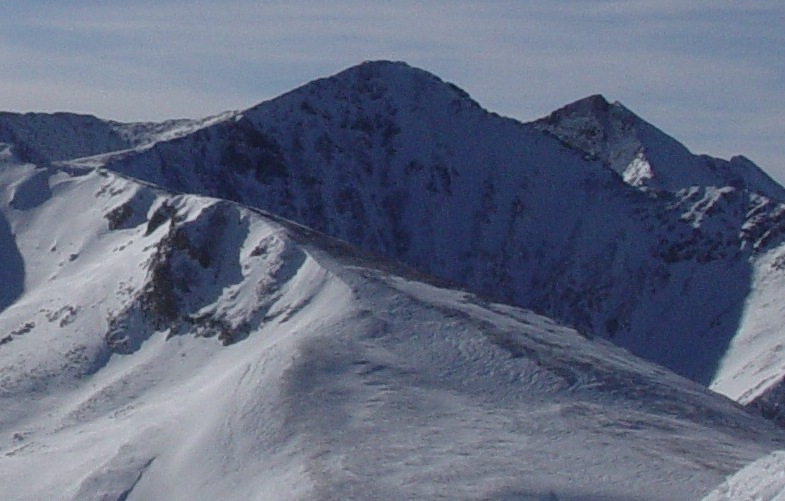
- Crystal Peak viewed from Peak 8

Highest point
- Elevation: 13,859 ft (4,224 m)
- Prominence: 632 ft (193 m)
- Isolation: 0.91 mi (1.46 km)
- Coordinates: 39°26′04″N 106°06′52″W

Geography
- Location within Colorado
- Location: Summit County, Colorado, U.S.
- Parent range: Tenmile Range
- Topo map(s): USGS 7.5' topographic map Breckenridge, Colorado

Climbing
- Easiest route: Class 2

Crystal Peak is a high mountain summit in the Tenmile Range of the Rocky Mountains of North America. The 13,859-foot (4,224 m) thirteener is in White River National Forest, 5.9 miles (9.5 km) southwest (bearing 220°) of the Town of Breckenridge in Summit County, Colorado, United States.

== Approach routes ==
Most climbers approach Crystal Peak from the east, in particular via the Crystal Lakes basin. This approach, a pleasant hike, follows jeep trails until treeline and Lower Crystal Lake. Four-wheel-drive vehicles can generally make it this far. A trail on the lake's north side takes climbers to Upper Crystal Lake, where gentle scree slopes provide access to the ridges north of the summit.

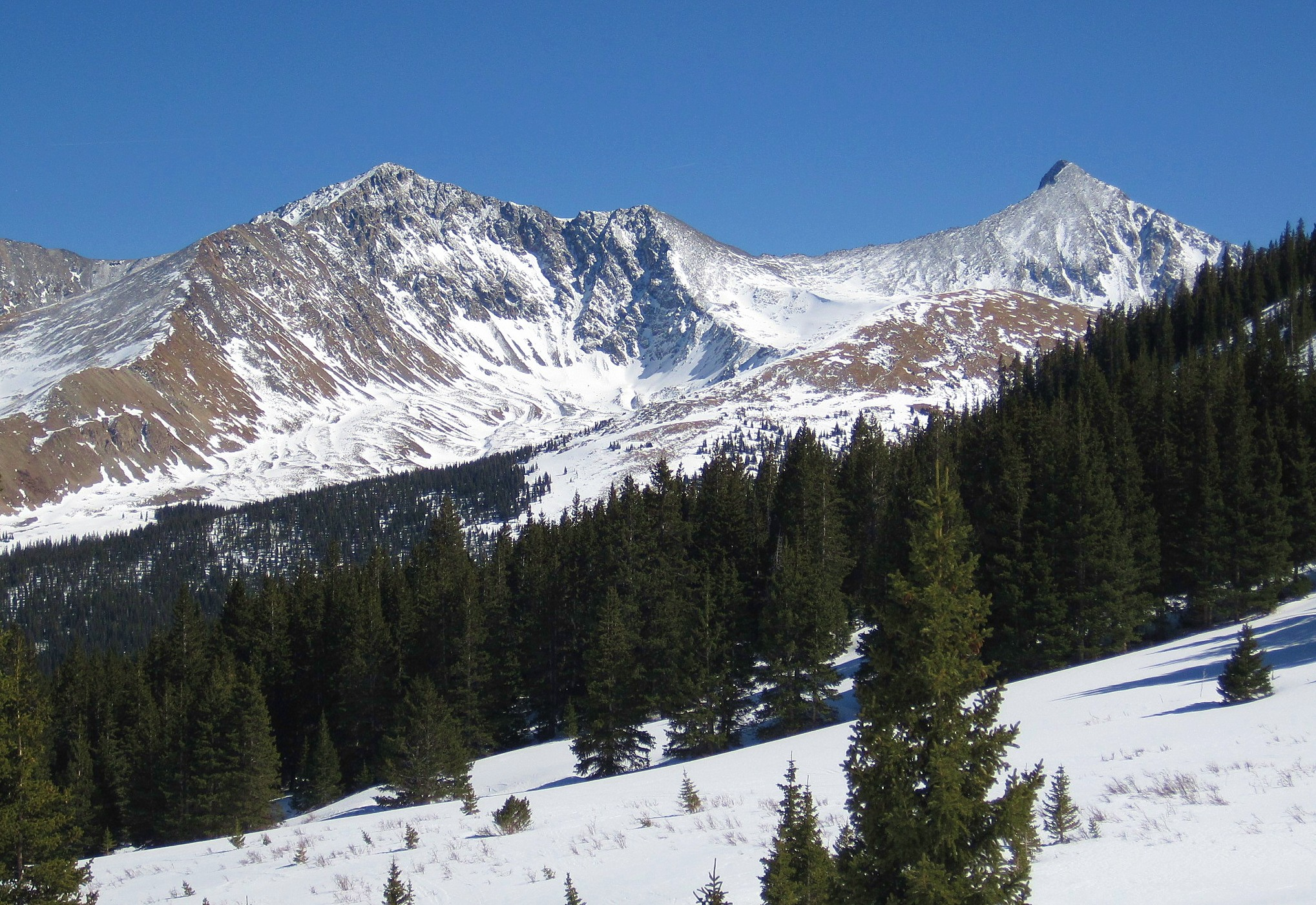
Crystal Peak (left) and line parent Pacific Peak

== Climate ==
According to the Köppen climate classification system, the mountain is located in an alpine subarctic climate zone with cold, snowy winters, and cool to warm summers. Due to its altitude, it receives precipitation all year, as snow in winter, and as thunderstorms in summer, with a dry period in late spring.

== See also ==
- List of Colorado mountain ranges
- List of Colorado mountain summits
  - List of Colorado fourteeners
  - List of Colorado 4000 meter prominent summits
  - List of the most prominent summits of Colorado
- List of Colorado county high points
