= Tenmile Creek (Snake River tributary) =

Stream in Washington, U.S.

Coordinates: 46°17′56″N 116°59′26″W

Tenmile Creek is a stream in the U.S. state of Washington. It is a tributary of the Snake River.

Tenmile Creek was named from its distance, 10 miles (16 km) over pioneer roads from Lewiston, Idaho.

== See also ==
- List of rivers of Washington (state)
