= Ten Mile Point =

Ten Mile Point may refer to the following:

- Ten Mile Point, British Columbia, a residential neighbourhood in Greater Victoria, British Columbia, Canada
- Ten Mile Point, New York, an area on the shore of Skaneateles Lake, New York, USA
- Ten Mile Point, Ontario, an area on Manitoulin Island near Little Current, in Ontario, Canada
