= Tenmile Creek (Wisconsin River tributary) =

Stream in Wisconsin, U.S.

Coordinates: 44°15′50″N 89°53′07″W

Tenmile Creek is a stream in the U.S. state of Wisconsin. It is a tributary to the Wisconsin River.

Tenmile Creek was so named for its distance, ten miles (16 km) from the original Grand Rapids townsite. The name sometimes is spelled out "Ten Mile Creek".
