= Tenmile Creek (Nooksack River tributary) =

Stream in Washington, U.S.

Coordinates: 48°51′20″N 122°34′36″W

Tenmile Creek is a stream in the U.S. state of Washington. It is a tributary of the Nooksack River.

Tenmile Creek was named from its distance, approximately 10 miles (16 km) away from Bellingham.

== See also ==
- List of rivers of Washington (state)
