= Tenmile Lake (Otter Tail County, Minnesota) =

Lake in the state of Minnesota, United States

- Location within Minnesota
- Location: Otter Tail County, Minnesota
- Coordinates: 46°7′39″N 95°58′14.5″W
- Type: lake

Tenmile Lake is a lake in Otter Tail County, in the U.S. state of Minnesota.

Tenmile Lake was named after the length of an old trail from the Red River to the lake, which is ten miles (16 km).

== See also ==
- List of lakes in Minnesota
