= Tenmile Lake (Beltrami County, Minnesota) =

Lake in the state of Minnesota, United States

- Location within Minnesota
- Location: Beltrami County, Minnesota
- Coordinates: 47°45′54″N 94°56′34″W
- Type: lake

Tenmile Lake is a lake in Beltrami County, Minnesota, in the United States.

Tenmile Lake was so named from its distance of 10 miles (16 km) from the Ojibwe agency.

== See also ==
- List of lakes in Minnesota
