= Tenmile Creek (Altamaha River tributary) =

Stream in Georgia, U.S.

Coordinates: 31.867°N 82.116°W

Tenmile Creek is a stream in the U.S. state of Georgia. It is a tributary to the Altamaha River.

Tenmile Creek was so named because it is 10 miles (16 km) away from Fort James Bluff. The name is sometimes spelled out as "Ten Mile Creek".
