= Tenmile Range =

Mountain range in the state of Colorado

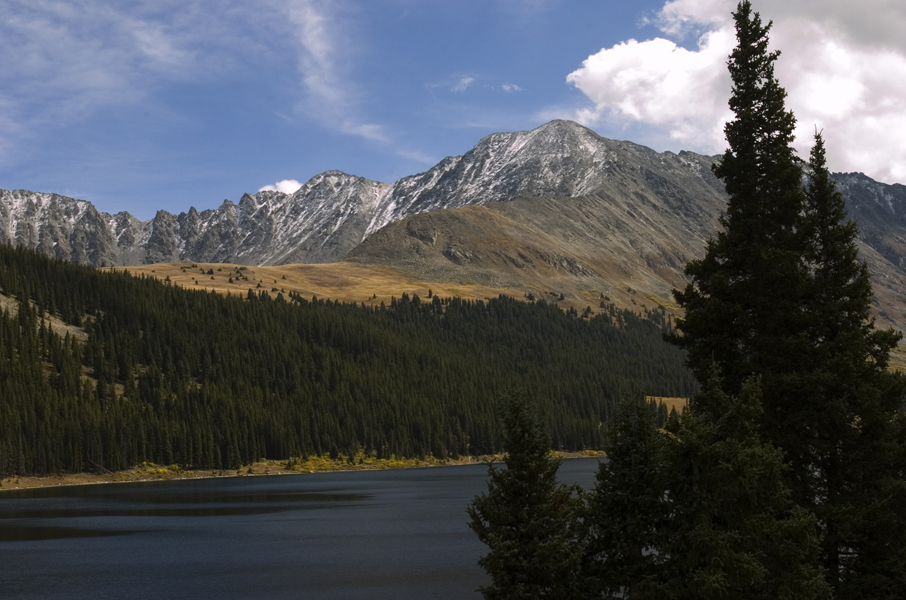
- View of the Fletcher Group of the Tenmile Range off State Highway 91 North of Leadville. The large foreground mountain is "Drift Peak" at 13,900 feet (4,237 m) above sea level. Fletcher Mountain is the smaller-looking peak to the left, though with an elevation of 13,951 feet (4,252 m) it is taller than Drift. Only Quandary Peak is higher in the Tenmile Range than Fletcher Mountain. Clinton Gulch Dam Reservoir can be seen in the foreground.

Highest point
- Peak: Quandary Peak
- Elevation: 14,271 ft (4,350 m)
- Listing: Mountain ranges of Colorado
- Coordinates: 39°23′50.2″N 106°06′22.9″W

Geography
- Location within Colorado
- Country: United States
- State: Colorado
- County: Summit
- Parent range: Rocky Mountains
- Borders on: Mosquito Range

The Tenmile Range is a mountain range in U.S. state of Colorado. The range is an extension of the Mosquito Range which is part of the Rocky Mountains. The two ranges are effectively the same range. They are split only by the Continental Divide and name. The Tenmile Range is on the north side of the divide, and the Mosquito on the south. The range is often referred to as the Tenmile-Mosquito Range.

There are more than a dozen peaks in the range. Peak 1 is the northernmost peak. The sub-peaks of Mt. Victoria and Mt. Royal are located north of Peak 1. Tenmile Peak, south of Peak 1, is also known as Peak 2. Quandary Peak is the southernmost peak and highest point in the Range, elevation 14,271 feet.

The range is famous for its skiing, both backcountry and resort areas. Breckenridge Ski Resort is in the range.

The Tenmile Range includes Pacific Tarn, believed to be the highest named lake in the United States.

Approximately 25,000 acres (100 km^{2}) of the Tenmile Range is protected in the Camp Hale – Continental Divide National Monument.

== Highest peaks ==
- Quandary Peak 14,271
- Fletcher Mountain 13,951
- Pacific Peak
- Unnamed Peak (commonly known as "Drift Peak") 13,900
- Crystal Peak 13,852
- Atlantic Peak 13,841
- Wheeler Mountain 13,690
- Peak 10 13,633
- Father Dyer Peak 13,615, named for the clergyman John Lewis Dyer
- North Star Mountain 13,614

== Additional information ==
- Peak 1 is the northernmost peak of the range.
- The numbered peaks begin with Peak 1 which is directly north of Tenmile Peak. This peak used to have a ski jumping hill for the town of Frisco. South of Peak 1 are Peaks 2 through 10. There are more than a dozen peaks in the range. The southernmost is Quandary Peak. Wheeler Peak and North Star Mountain sit in both the Ten Mile (north) and Mosquito Ranges (south), straddling the Continental Divide.
- Breckenridge Ski Resort occupies the east faces of Peaks 6-10. The summits of Peak 6 and Peak 8 are both accessible by chairlift. The Kensho SuperChair on Peak 6 terminates at a crest in a ridge 300 feet below the summit, while the Imperial Express SuperChair stops at 12,840 feet, 160 feet below the summit of Peak 8. The true summits of both peaks can then be accessed by a short hike from the top of either lift.
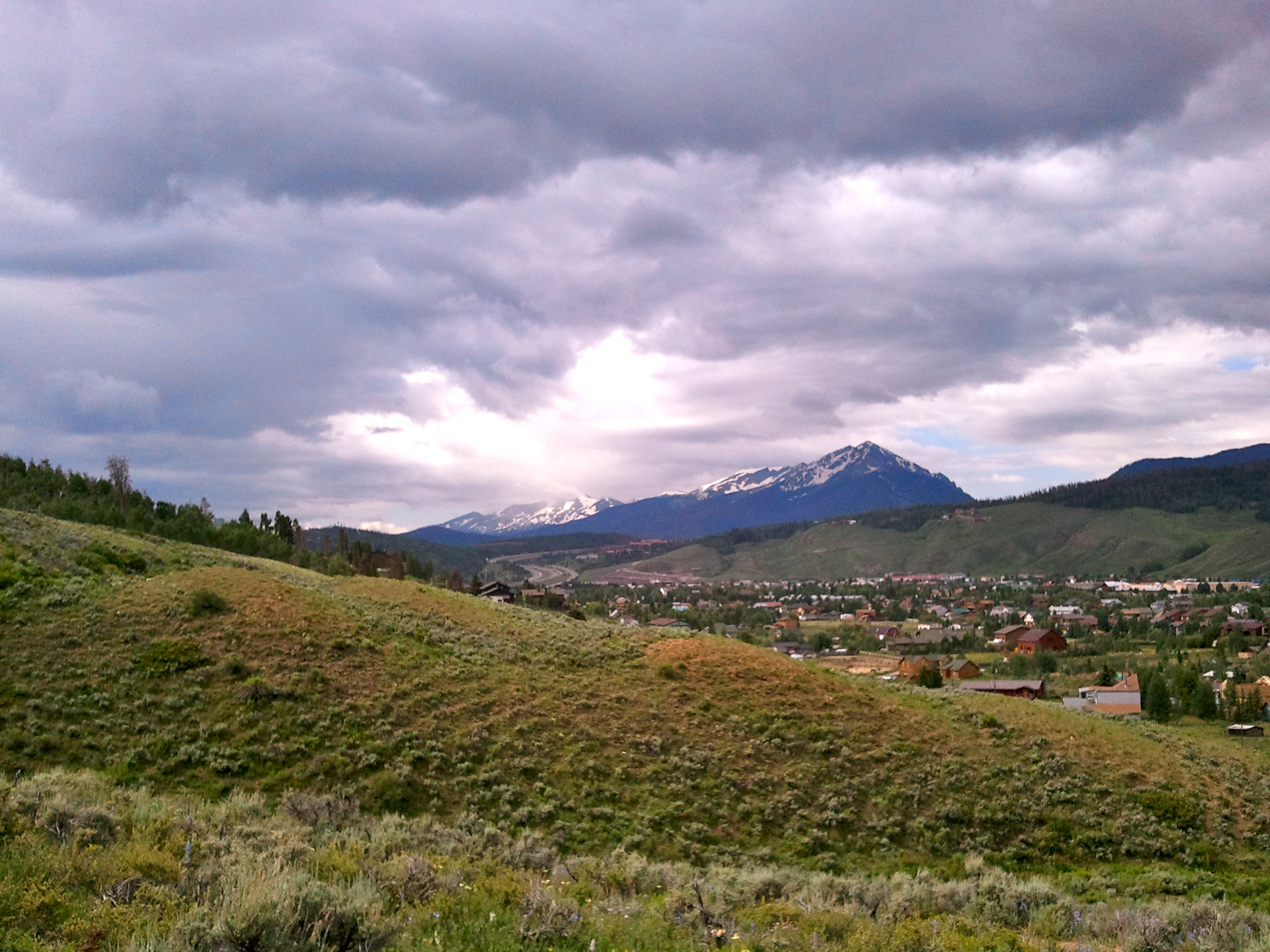
Peak 1 seen from Silverthorne

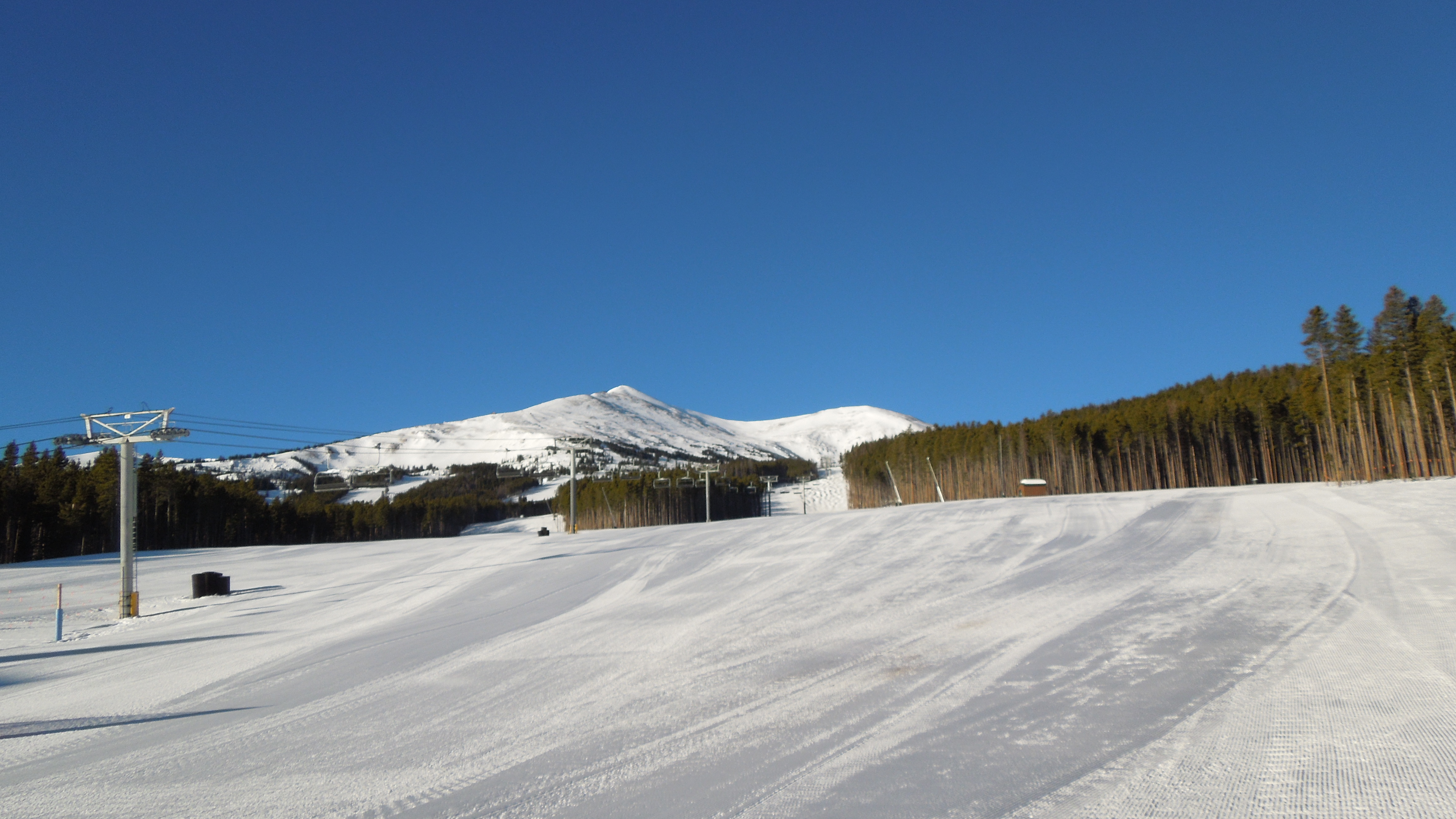
The eastern side of Peaks 7 and 8 as viewed from the bottom of the Independence SuperChair

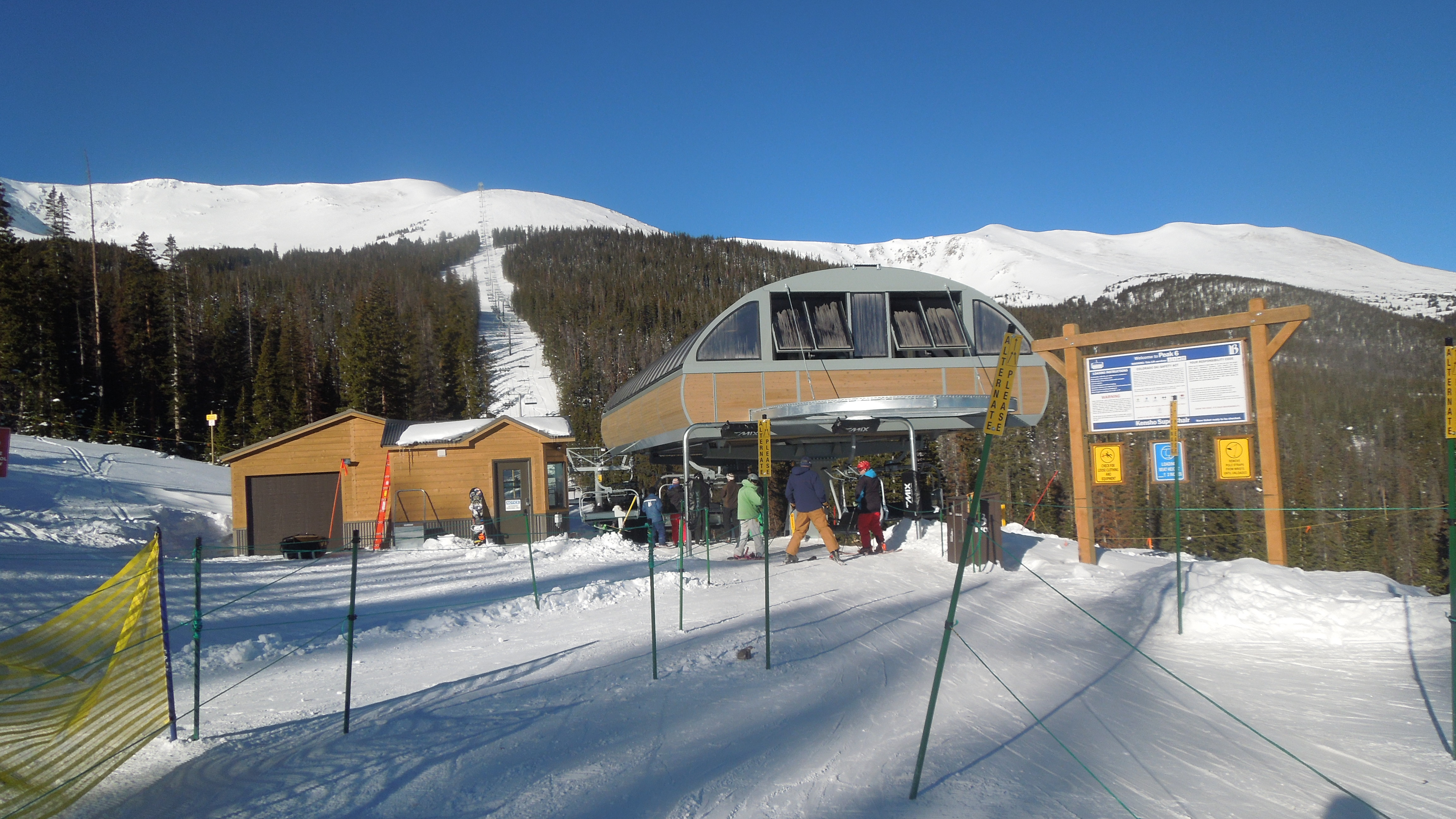
The Kensho SuperChair provides lift access to the summit of Peak 6

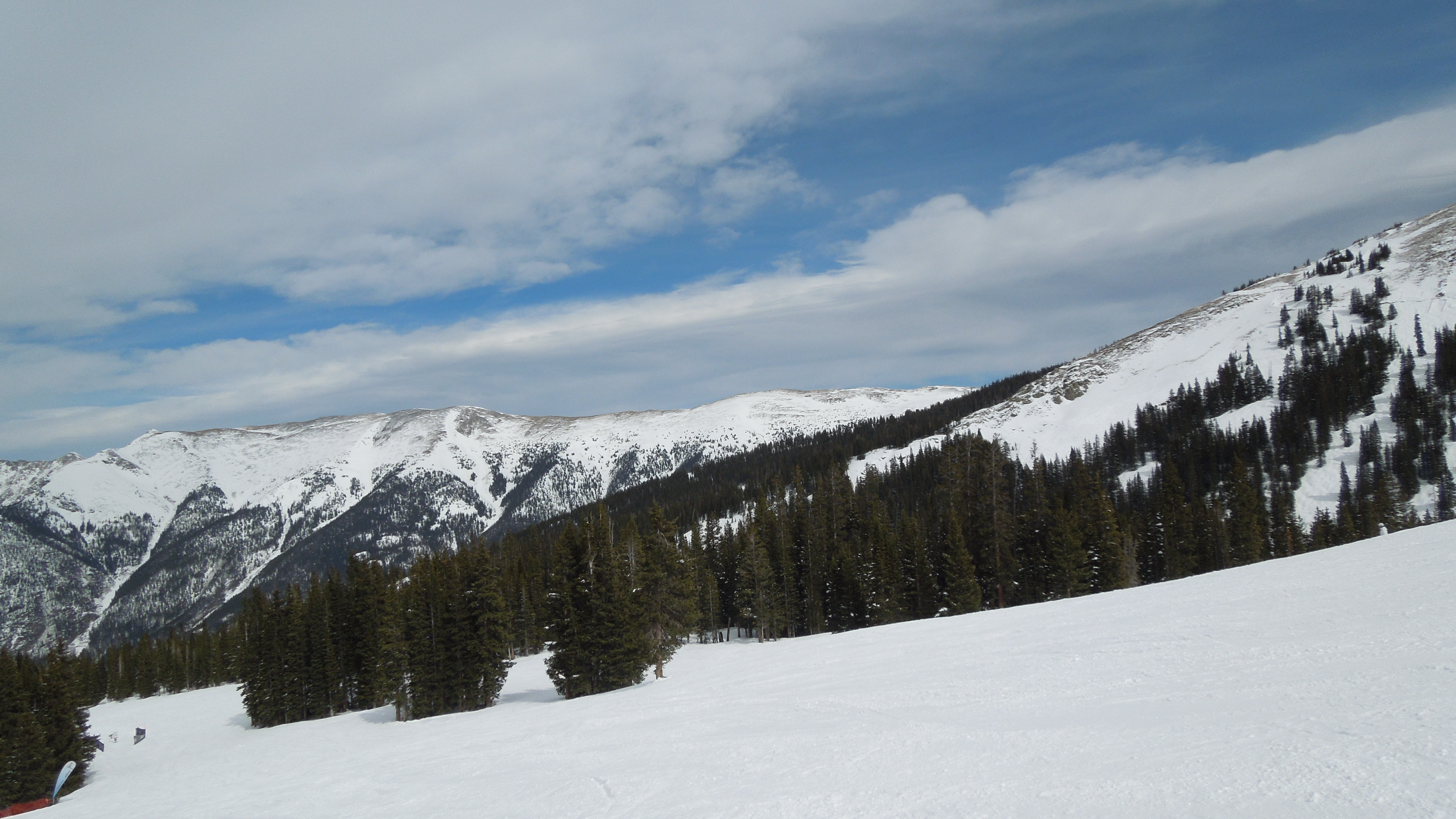
A view of Peak 4, Peak 5, and Peak 6 from near the top of the Timberline Express at Copper Mountain

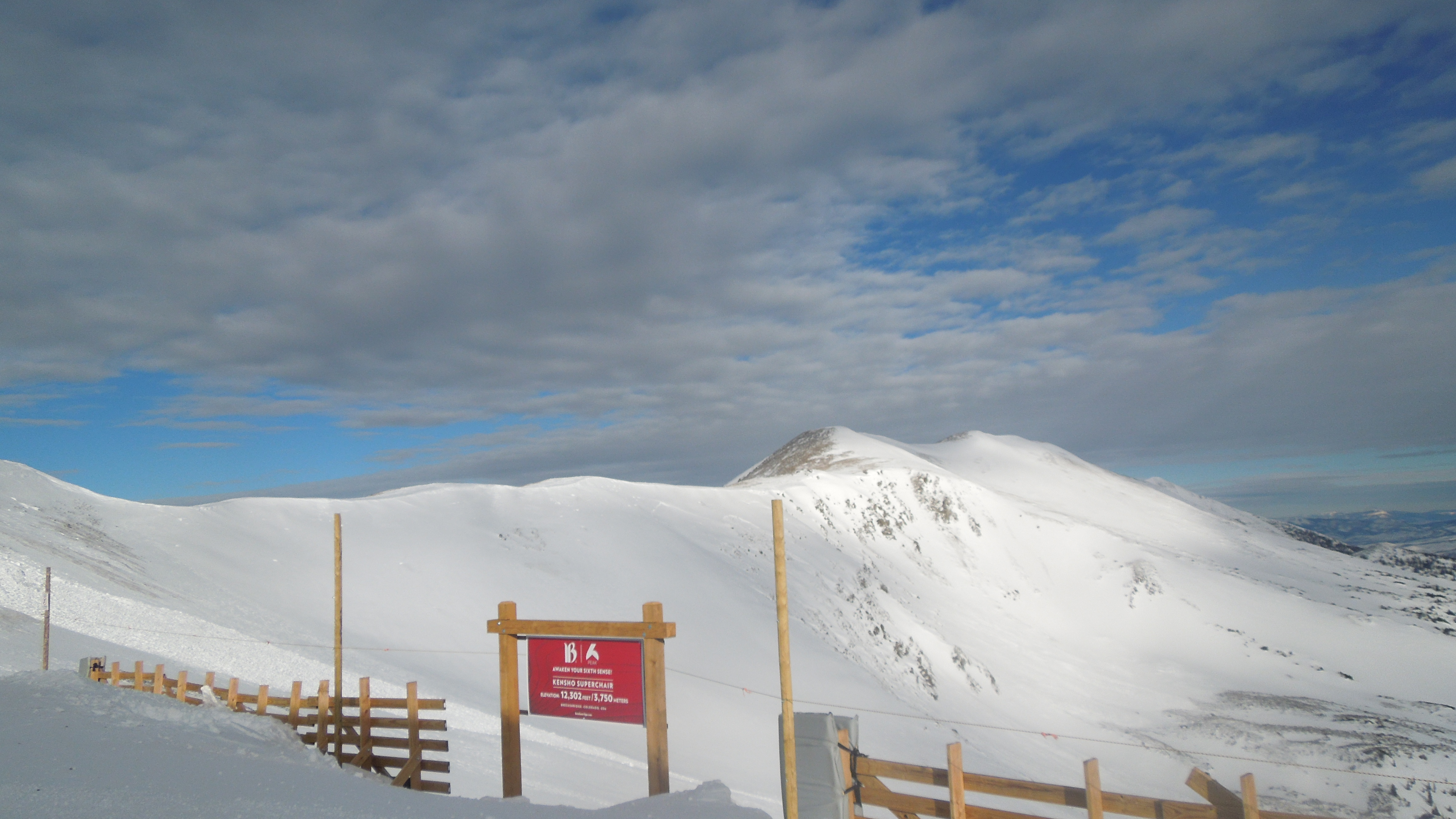
A view of Peak 5 from the top of the Kensho SuperChair on Peak 6

== Gallery ==
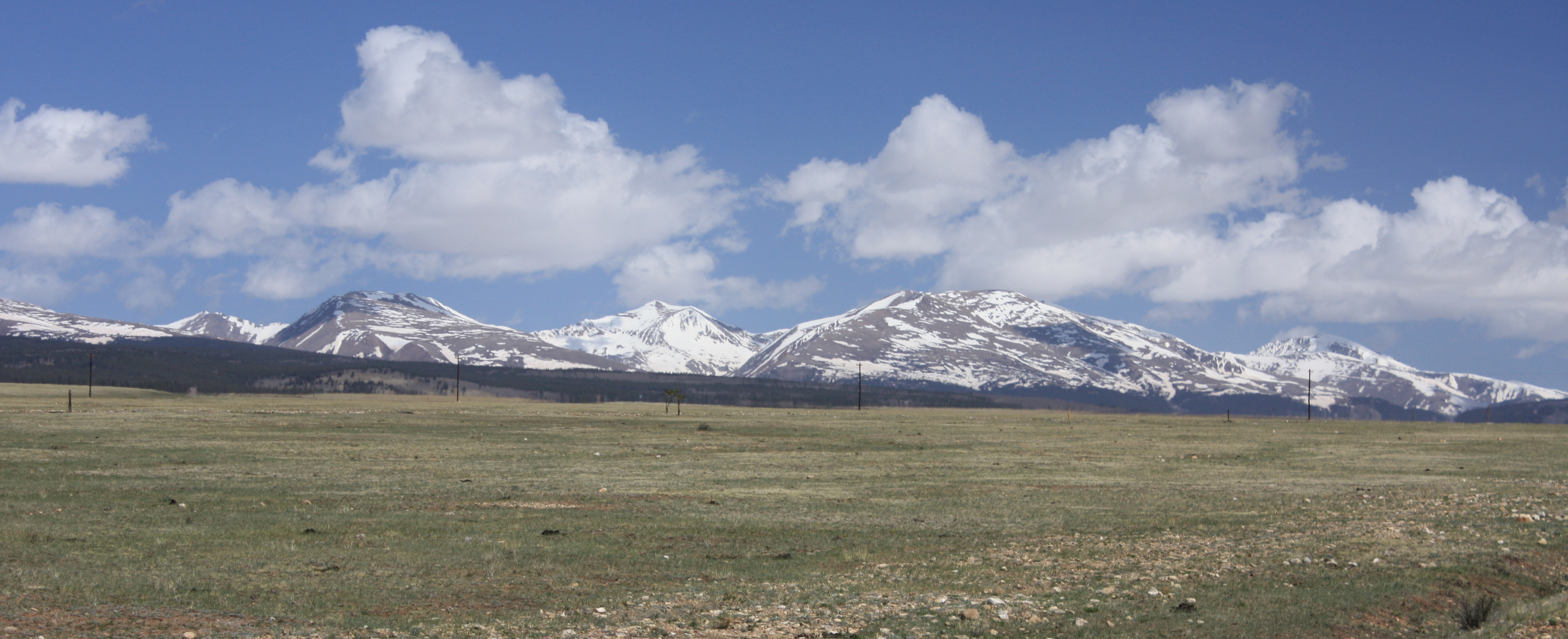
Tenmile and Mosquito Ranges: (left to right) Loveland Mountain (13,692 ft), Mount Democrat, Mount Bross & Quandary Peak. View from U.S. 285, about eight miles south of Fairplay.
