= Ten Mile Creek Bridge =

Ten Mile Creek Bridge or Tenmile Creek Bridge may refer to:

- Ten Mile Creek Bridge (Iowa), listed at National Register of Historic Places listings in Winneshiek County, Iowa
- Ten Mile Creek Bridge (Oregon), listed on the NRHP in Oregon
