= Ten Mile Run =

Ten Mile Run or Tenmile Run may refer to:

- Ten Mile Run (New Jersey), a tributary of the Millstone River
- Ten Mile Run, New Jersey, a census-designated place and unincorporated community in Somerset County
- Tenmile Run (Susquehanna River), in Columbia County, Pennsylvania
