= Tenmile Creek (Colorado) =

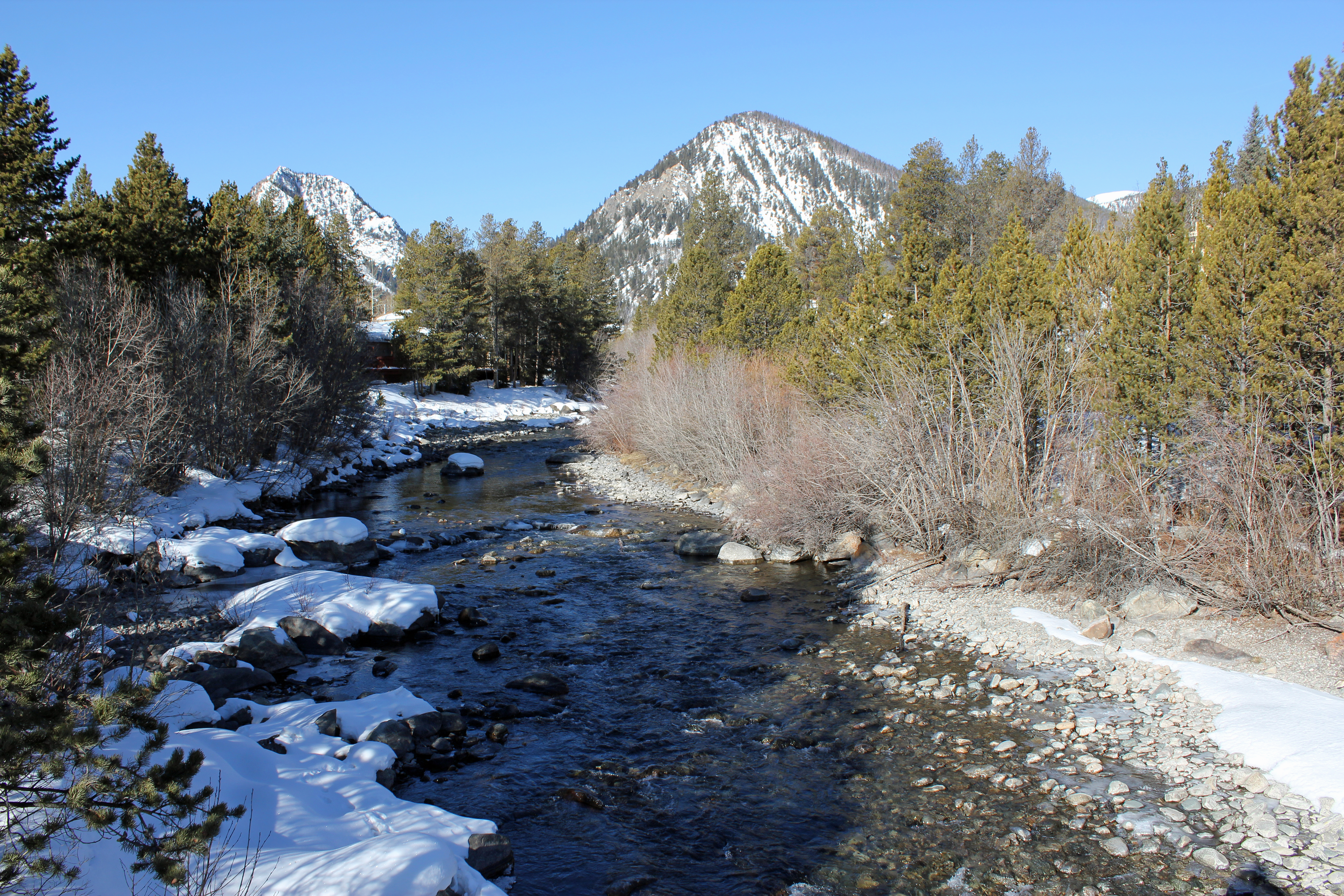
- The creek in Frisco, Colorado, just before it empties into Dillon Reservoir.

Physical characteristics
- Source
  - location: Summit County, Colorado
  - coordinates: 39°25′11″N 106°11′21″W
- Mouth
  - location: Dillon Reservoir
  - coordinates: 39°36′55″N 106°03′15″W
  - elevation: 9,022 ft (2,750 m)

Basin features
- Progression: Blue River— Colorado

Tenmile Creek (also called Ten Mile Creek) is a stream in Summit County, Colorado. It rises above the Copper Mountain Ski Resort and follows alongside Interstate 70 for several miles before emptying into Dillon Reservoir.

The creek — along with a paved trail that follows alongside it — is easily visible from Interstate 70 between Frisco and the Copper Mountain Ski Area.

One of its tributaries, North Tenmile Creek, merges with it near Interstate 70. After this confluence, the creek flows near East Main Street in Frisco before it enters Dillon Reservoir.

== See also ==
- List of rivers of Colorado
- List of tributaries of the Colorado River
