= 2025 Badwater 135 =

Ultramarathon race in the United States

2025 Badwater Ultramarathon
- Location: start Badwater Basin, California, end Whitney Portal, Mount Whitney. U.S.
- Date: July 7, 2025
- Website: http://www.badwater.com

Champions
- Men: Norway Simen Holvik (21:47:45)
- Women: United States Marisa Lizak (25:07:31)

The 2025 Badwater Ultramarathon started on July 7 and concluded on July 9. The race started in Badwater Basin, California's Death Valley and ended at Whitney Portal, the trailhead to Mount Whitney. In the men's division, Norwegian ultra runner Simen Holvik crossed the finish line as the winner with a time of 21:47:45. In the women's division, American runner Marisa Lizak claimed victory, finishing with a one-hour lead over the second-place competitor.

On July 8, midway through the race, temperatures in the area rose to 117 °F, or 47 °C.
