= Mount Hitchcock (California) =

Mountain in California, United States

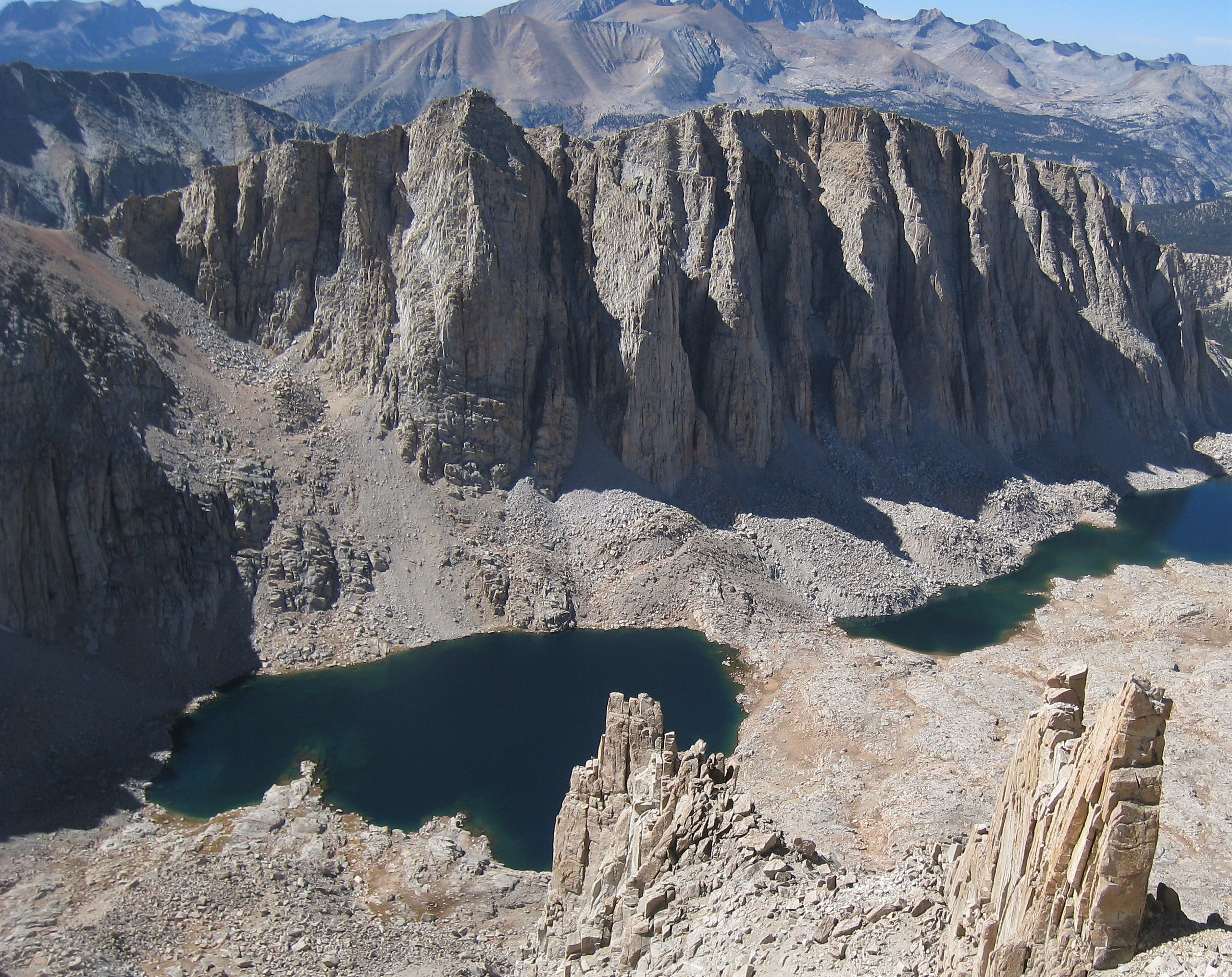
- Northeast aspect from Trail Crest

Highest point
- Elevation: 13,186 ft (4,019 m)
- Prominence: 456 ft (139 m)
- Parent peak: Mount Muir (14,018 ft)
- Isolation: 1.32 mi (2.12 km)
- Listing: Sierra Peaks Section
- Coordinates: 36°33′18″N 118°18′43″W

Naming
- Etymology: Charles Henry Hitchcock

Geography
- Location within California Location within the United States
- Country: United States
- State: California
- County: Tulare
- Protected area: Sequoia National Park
- Parent range: Sierra Nevada
- Topo map: USGS Mount Whitney

Geology
- Rock age: Cretaceous
- Mountain type: Fault block
- Rock type: granitic

Climbing
- First ascent: 1881
- Easiest route: class 2 West slope

Mount Hitchcock is a 13,186-foot-elevation (4,019-meter) mountain summit located west of the crest of the Sierra Nevada mountain range in Tulare County, California. It is situated in Sequoia National Park, and is two miles (3.2 km) south-southwest of Mount Whitney, 1.3 miles (2.1 km) southwest of Mount Muir, and 1.1 miles (1.8 km) west of Trail Crest. Topographic relief is significant as it rises approximately 1,500 feet (460 meters) above Hitchcock Lakes in less than one-half mile. Mt. Hitchcock ranks as the 112th highest summit in California.

== History ==
In 1881, Rev. Frederick H. Wales of Tulare climbed nearby Mount Young, where he left a record of its name, and the name of the peak south of it, for which he suggested the name "Mount Hitchcock." This mountain's name was officially adopted in 1909 by the U.S. Board on Geographic Names to honor the eminent American geologist Charles Henry Hitchcock (1836–1919). Hitchcock was teaching at Dartmouth College while Wales was a Dartmouth student (1872 graduate). The first ascent of the summit was made in September 1881, by Frederick H. Wales via the west slope. During the same month, Wales also made the first ascent of Mount Kaweah. Wales Lake, three miles to the north of Hitchcock, was named after him.

== Climate ==
According to the Köppen climate classification system, Mount Hitchcock has an alpine climate. Most weather fronts originate in the Pacific Ocean, and travel east toward the Sierra Nevada mountains. As fronts approach, they are forced upward by the peaks, causing them to drop their moisture in the form of rain or snowfall onto the range (orographic lift). Precipitation runoff from this mountain drains west to the Kern River via Whitney Creek.

== See also ==
- Mount Chamberlin
- List of mountain peaks of California

== Gallery ==
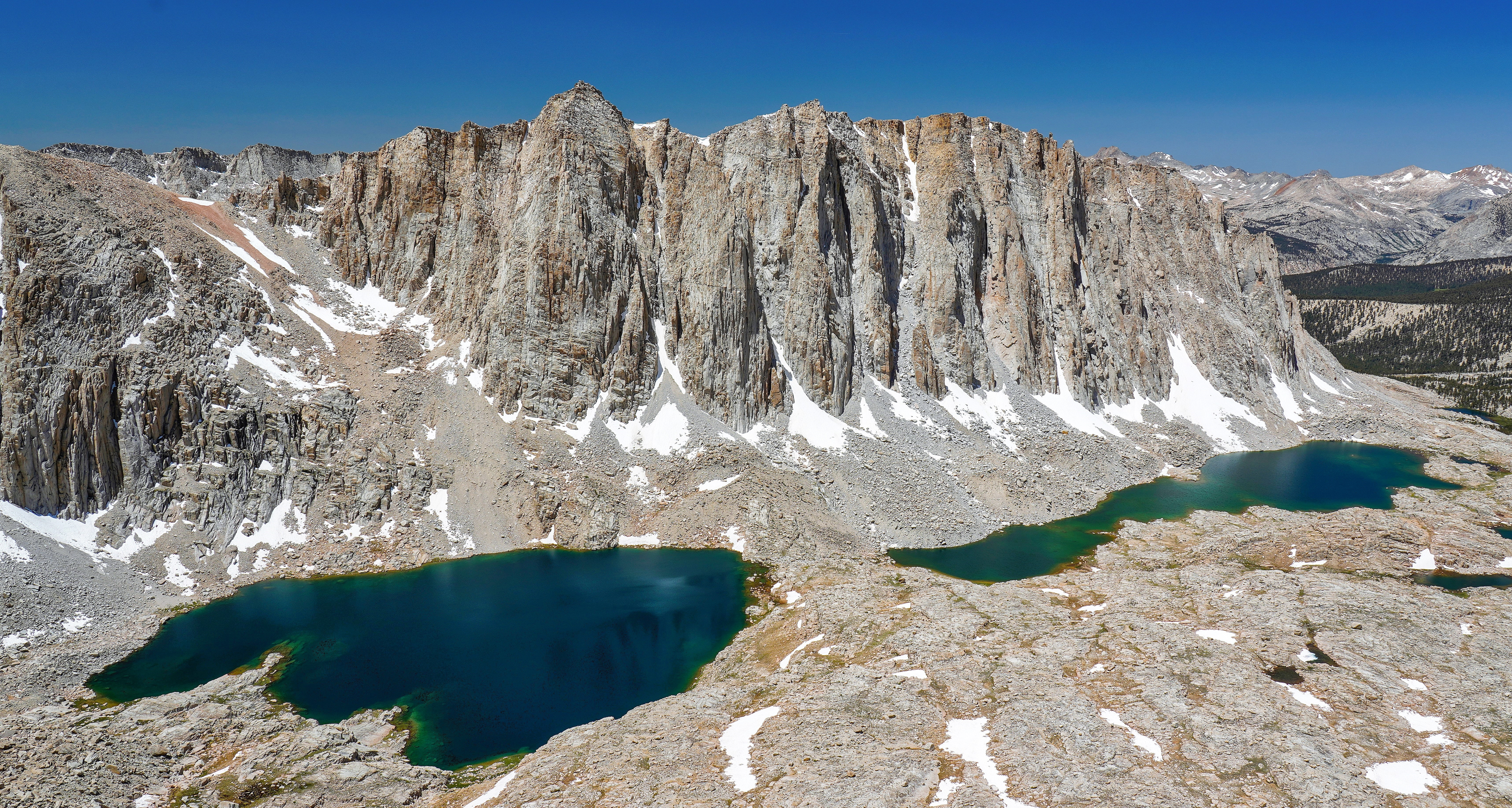
Mount Hitchcock above Hitchcock Lakes

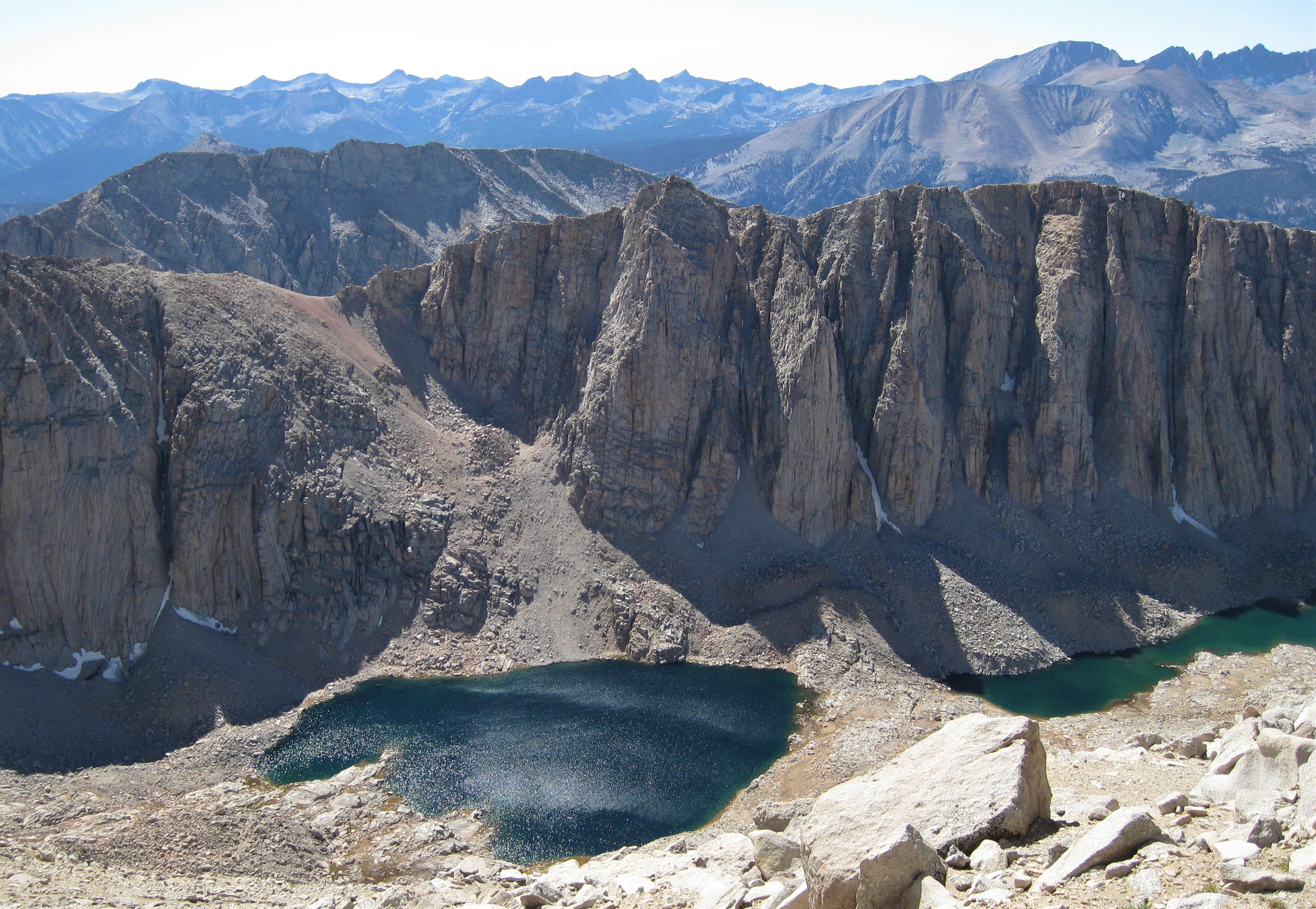
summit centered

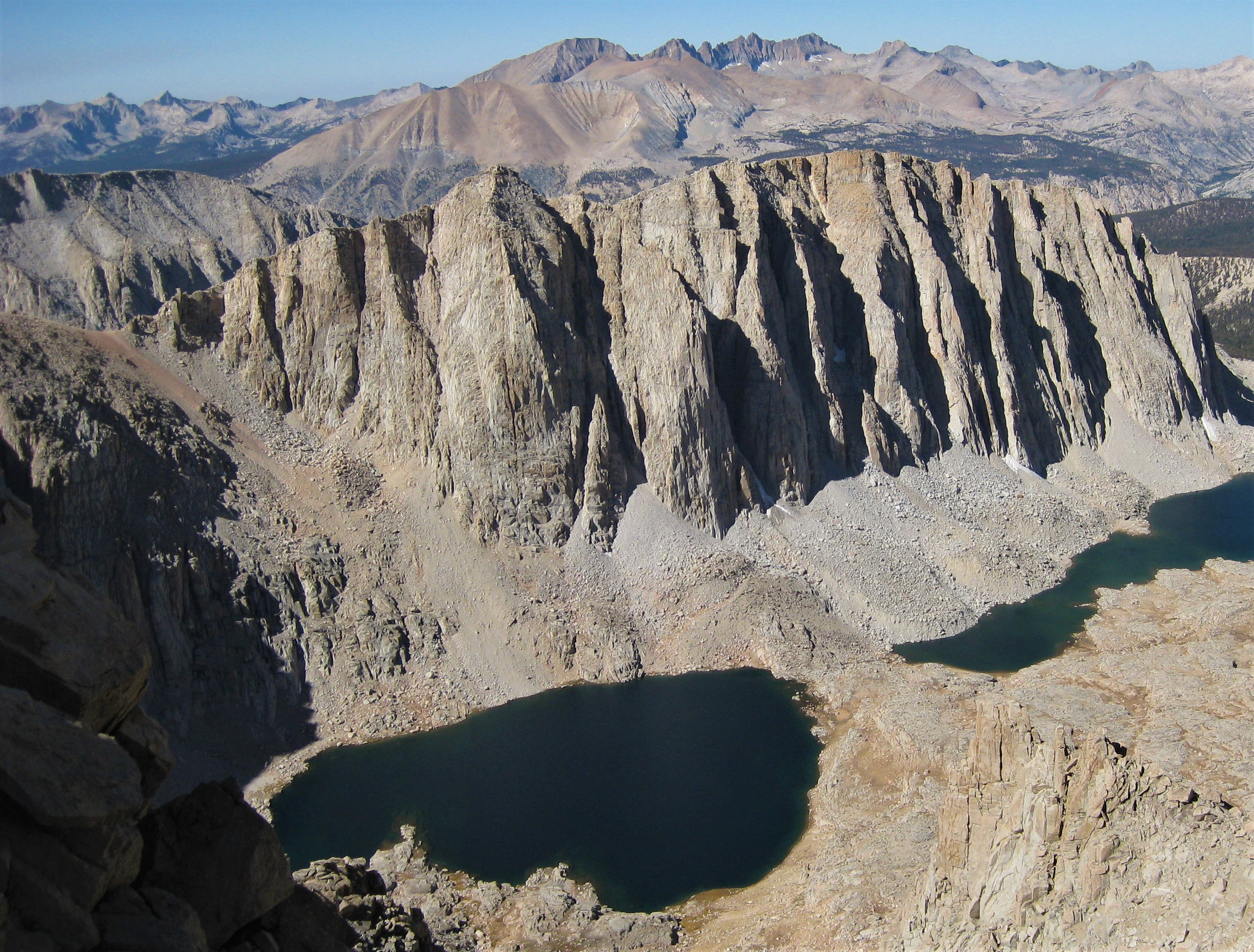
Mt. Hitchcock above Hitchcock Lakes

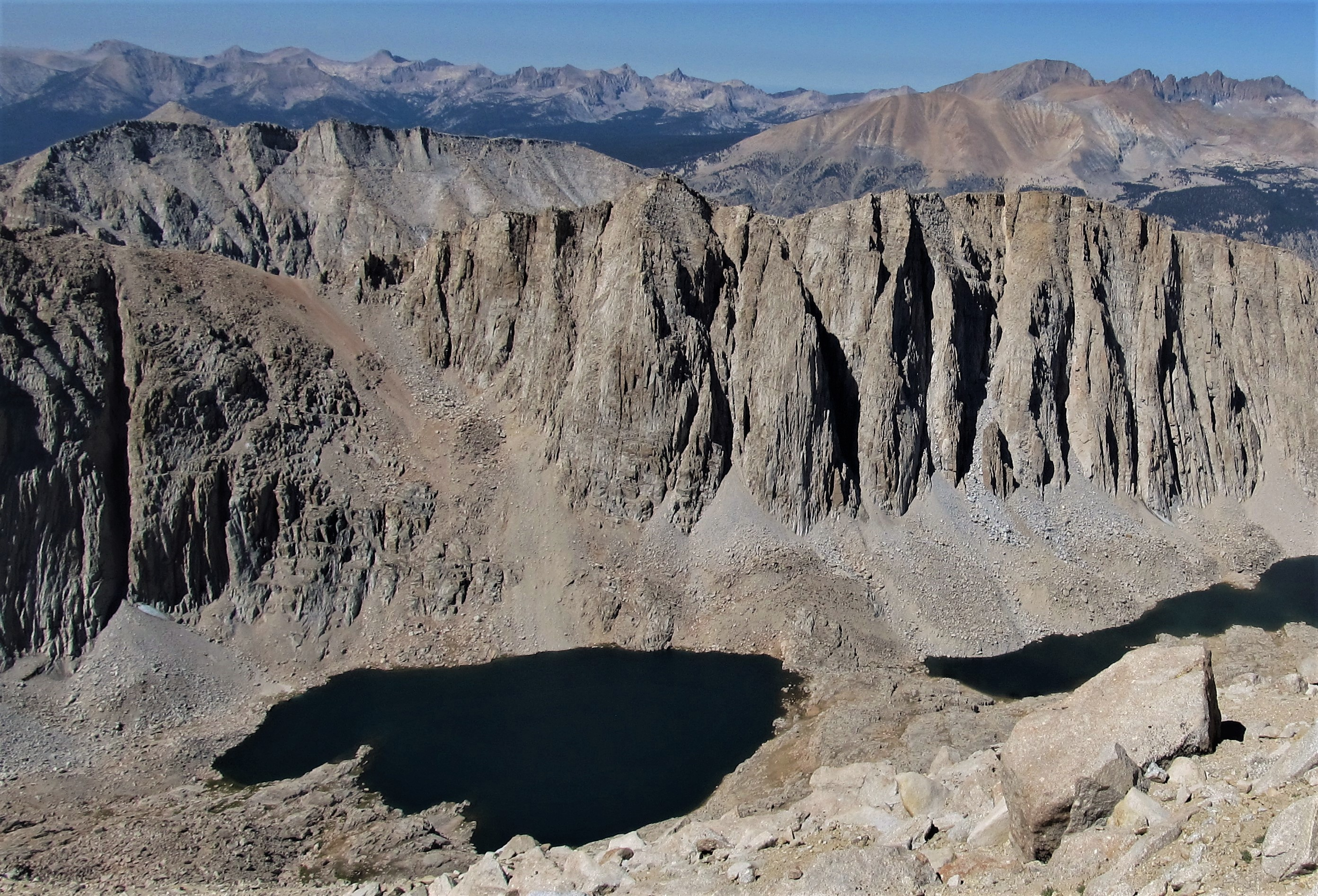
Northeast aspect. (Kaweah Peaks upper right)

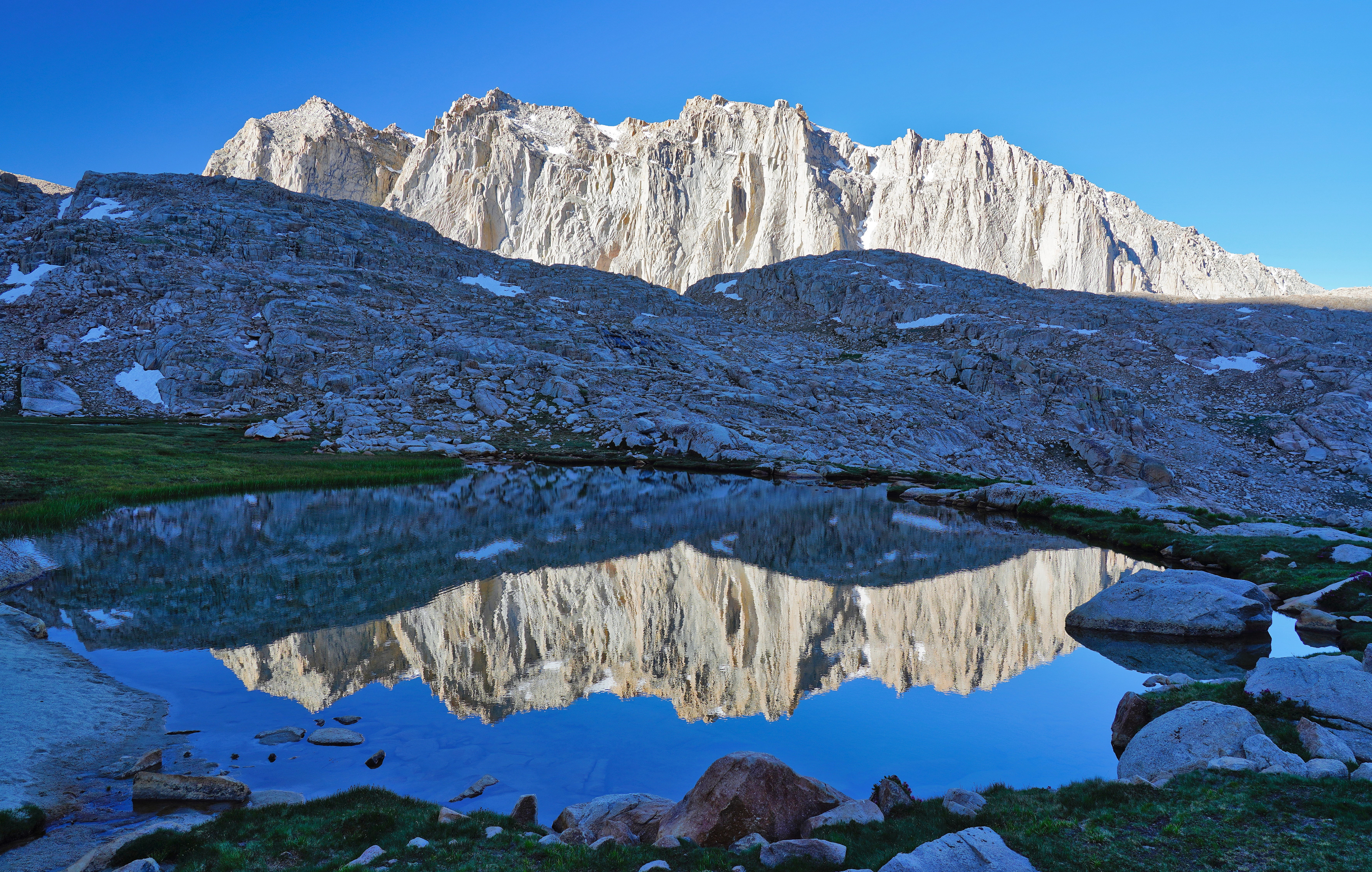
North aspect reflected in a tarn

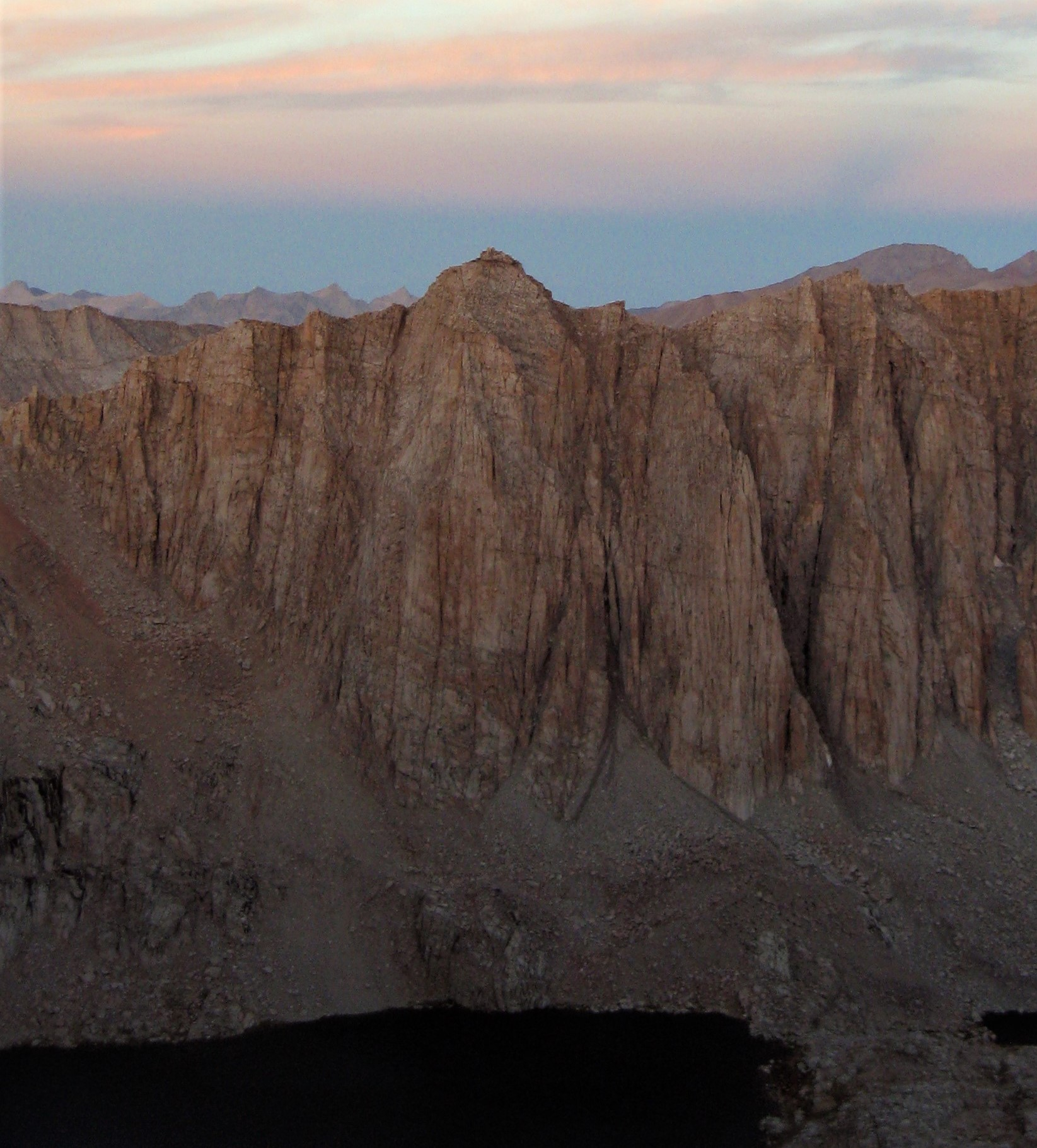
Mt. Hitchcock at dawn

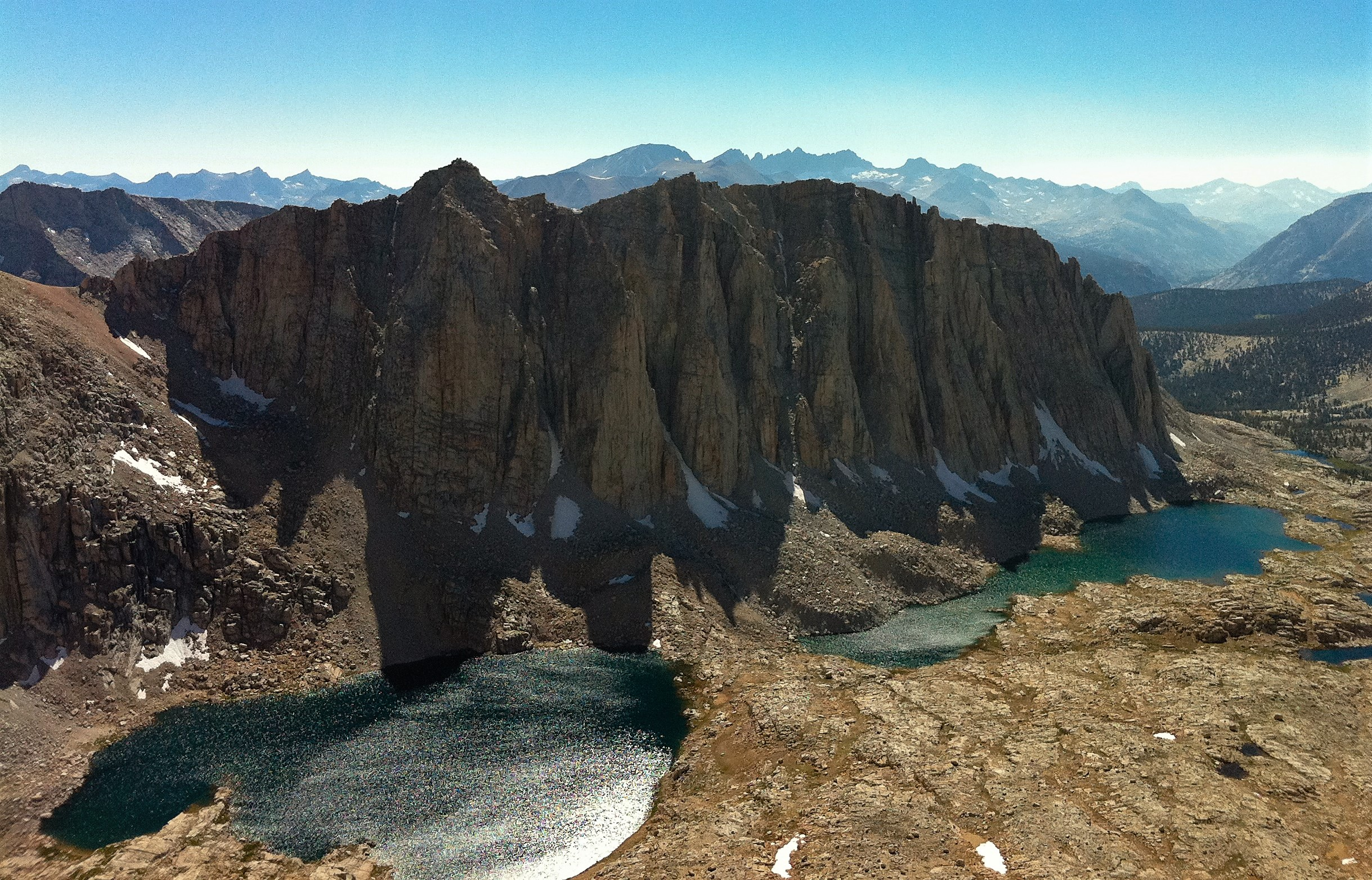

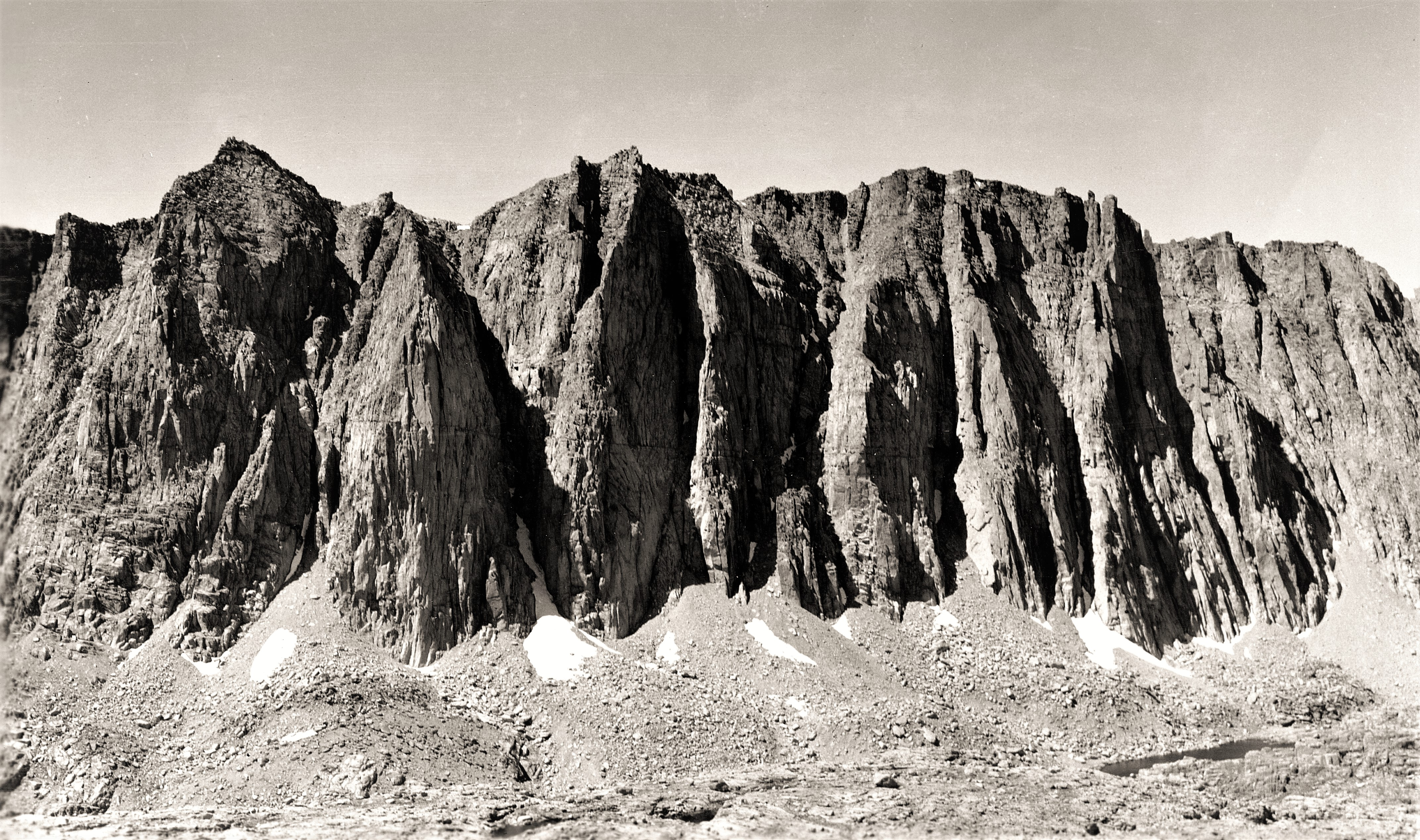
East face in 1935
