= Whitney Classic =

Mountain bike race

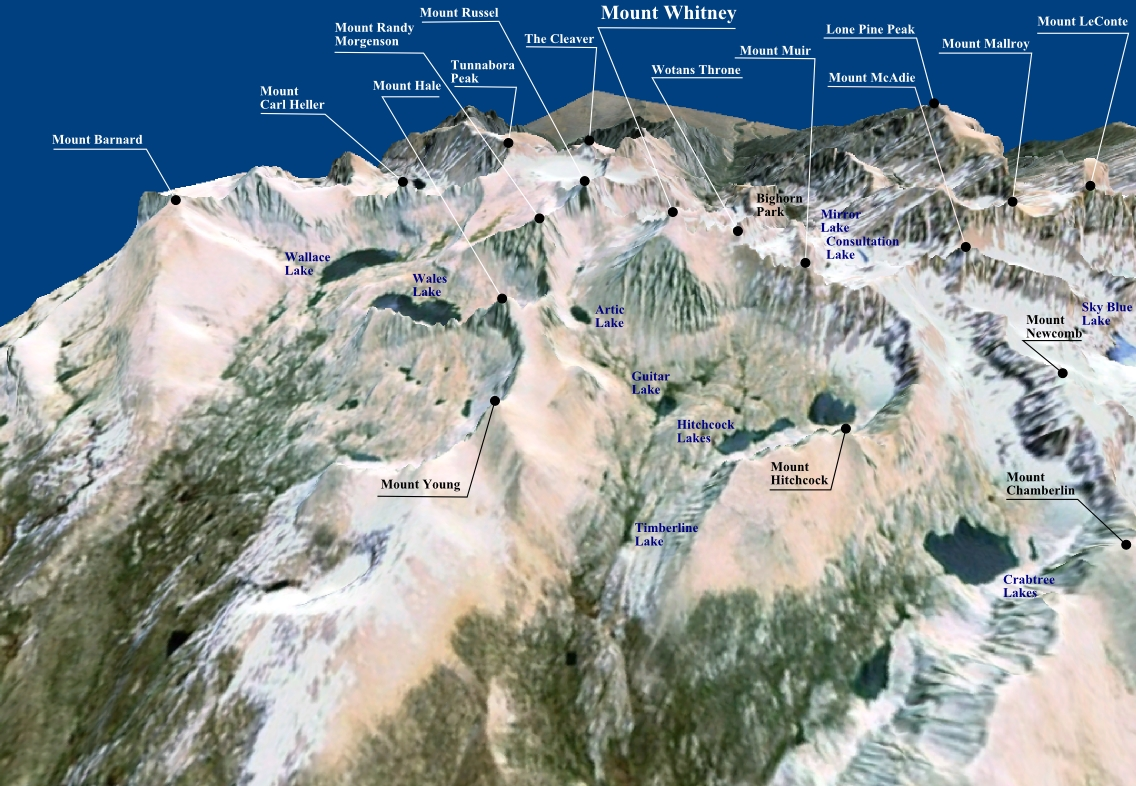
- A 3D image of Mount Whitney based on topographic data from NASA and World Imagery
- Status: Active
- Genre: 136-mile-long (219 km) endurance mountain bike race
- Frequency: Annually; in fall
- Venue: Mount Whitney
- Locations: Sequoia National Park / Inyo National Forest, California
- Coordinates: 36°34′43″N 118°17′31″W
- Country: United States of America
- Organiser: Summit Adventure
- Website: summitadventure.com/whitney.htm

The Whitney Classic is an 136-mile-long (219 km) endurance mountain bike race that is held in late September or October every year. The ride runs from the Badwater Basin in Death Valley to Whitney Portal. Badwater, at 279 feet (85 m) below sea level, is the lowest place in the North America and Whitney Portal at 8,360 feet (2,550 m) is the trailhead that leads to Mount Whitney, the highest peak in the contiguous United States with an elevation of 14,505 feet (4,421 m).

== The ride ==
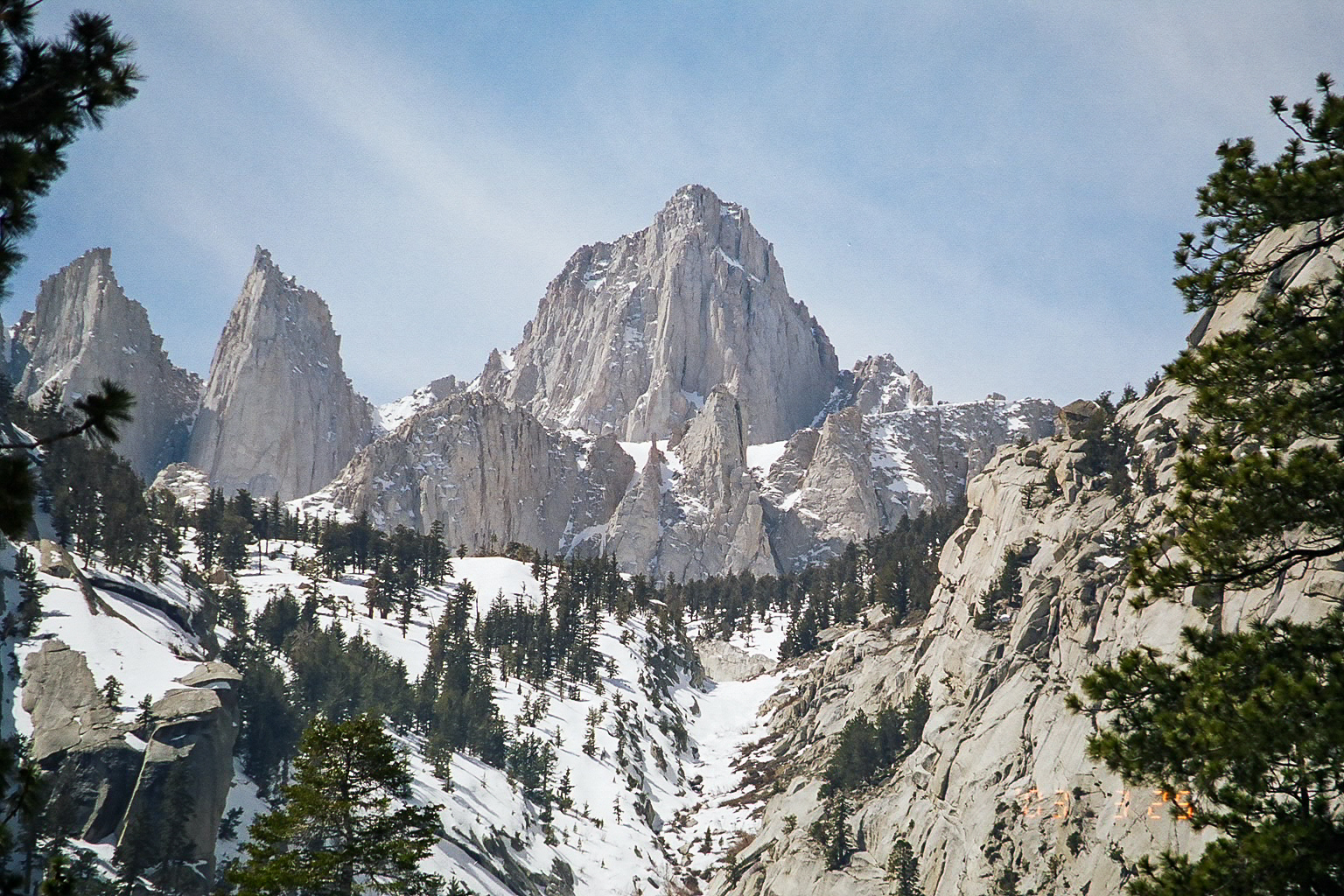
Mount Whitney

The ride is 136 miles (219 km) long with an elevation gain of 15,800 feet (4,800 m). There are three major hills: Townes Pass, climbing up from Stovepipe Wells; Hillcrest, climbing from Panamint Springs; and the Whitney Portal Road, which leaves the town of Lone Pine, California to climb to the Portal.

1. Townes Pass is 16.6 miles (26.7 km) long with an elevation gain of more than 5,000 feet (1,500 m);
2. Hillcrest is 11.9 miles (19.2 km) long, with an elevation gain of slightly more than 3,000 feet (910 m); and
3. The Whitney Portal road gains close to 5,000 feet (1,500 m) in 12 miles (19 km).

In addition to long distances and elevation, the temperature can play a major factor. At the start in Badwater, temperatures can routinely be as high as 130 °F (54 °C) degrees, but the temperature quickly drops at higher altitudes. Below freezing temperatures can be encountered near the Portal at night, making temperature swings of over 100 °F (38 °C) degrees possible in a single day.

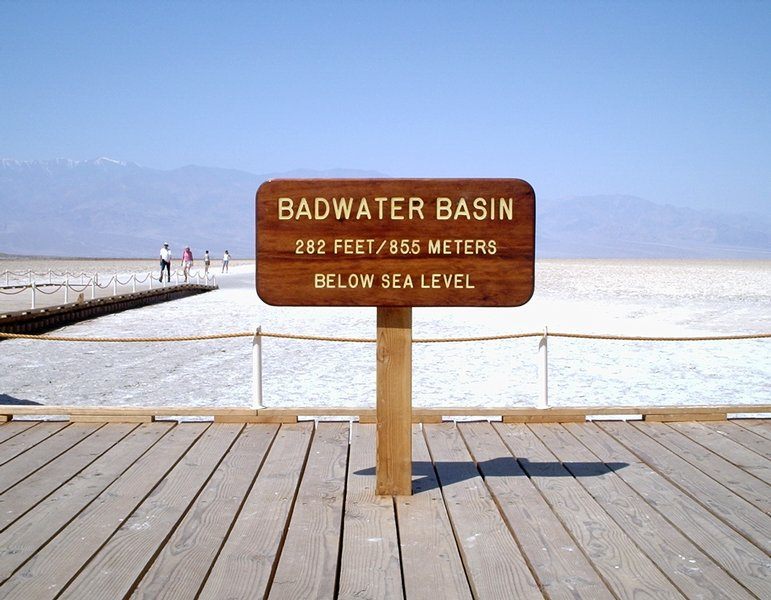
Badwater Basin elevation sign.

The ride is a small event, with an average number of riders in the 50s. Riders may ride as individuals or as a team. Due to the heat, the cold, the length, the hills, the dark, and a number of other factors, it is not unusual for 25-50% of the participants not to finish.

== History ==
The Whitney Classic started in 1981 as a fundraiser for Summit Adventure, a non-profit wilderness ministry in Bass Lake, California, and still serves as a major fundraiser for the organization. There are multiple races and runs that travel the same course, including the Badwater Ultramarathon, held in July every year.

The ride was originally conceived as a Badwater to the summit of Whitney bike-hike event, making it the lowest to highest. In later years, as the United States Forest Service required summit permits to climb Mt. Whitney, the official course was shortened to end at Whitney Portal. Forest Service regulations do not allow competitive events in the John Muir Wilderness, however, many riders choose to continue tradition and complete the ascent to Mount Whitney's summit on their own.

== See also ==
- Badwater Ultramarathon
