= Charles Henry Hitchcock =

American geologist (1836–1919)

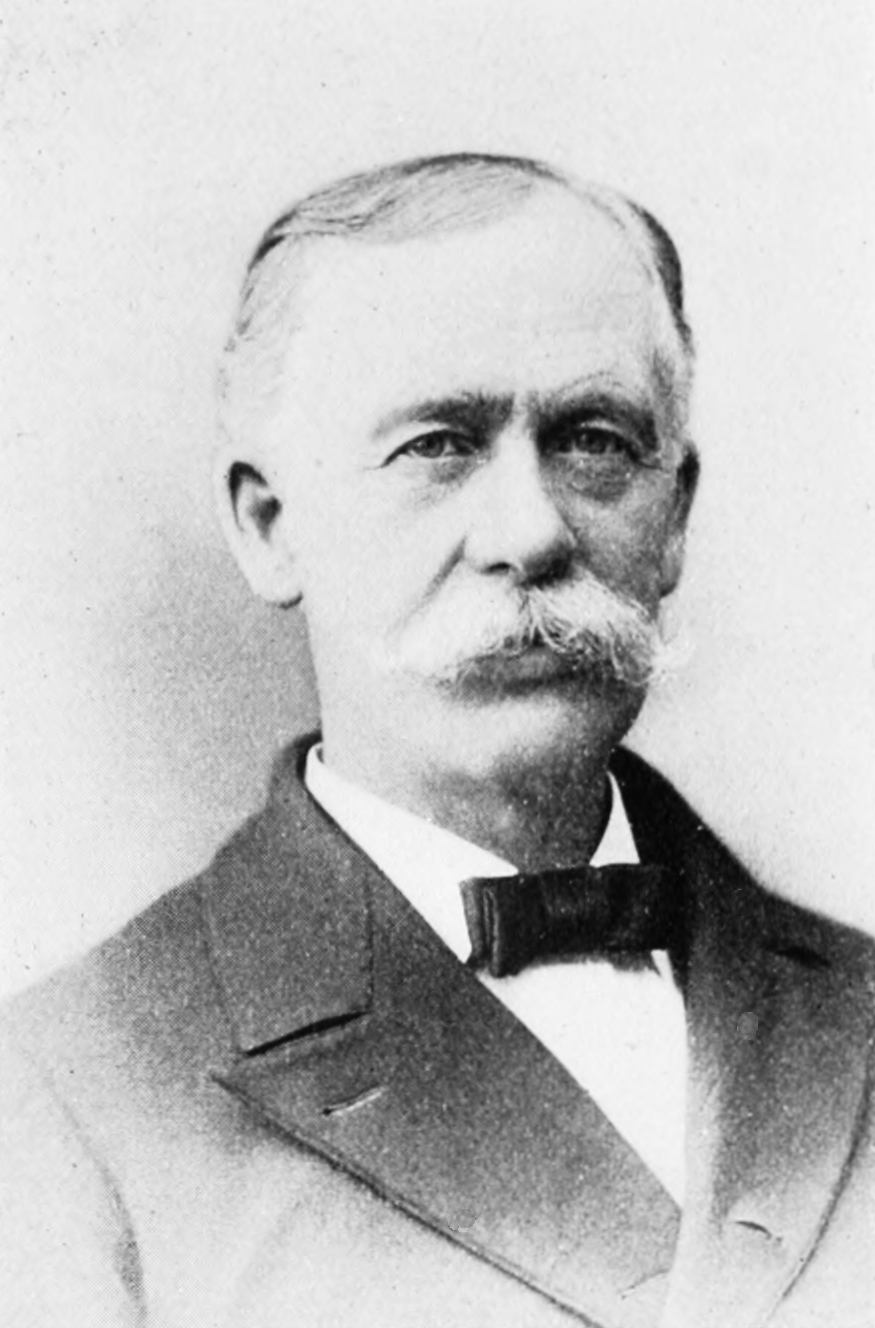
Charles Henry Hitchcock

Charles Henry Hitchcock (August 23, 1836 – November 5, 1919) was an American geologist.

== Life ==
Hitchcock was born August 23, 1836, in Amherst, Massachusetts. His father was Edward Hitchcock (1793–1864) who was a professor of geology and natural theology and then president of Amherst College. His mother was Orra White Hitchcock, who illustrated much of his father's work. He graduated from Amherst College in 1856, and considered entering the ministry. He married Martha Bliss Barrows.

He was assistant state geologist of Vermont 1857-61 and state geologist of Maine 1861–62. In 1866 and 1867, Hitchcock studied at the Royal School of Mines in London, examined fossils in the British Museum, and visited glaciers in Switzerland. Hitchcock served as New Hampshire state geologist from 1868 to 1878. His survey produced a three volume report, and an atlas of maps. It was the first set of detailed maps of the geology of the state. In connection with his survey of New Hampshire, he maintained, during the winter of 1870, a meteorological station on Mount Washington, the earliest high-mountain observatory in the United States. He was elected as a member to the American Philosophical Society in 1870.

He taught at Dartmouth College in 1868 and from 1869 to 1908 held the Hall Professorship of Geology and Mineralogy. He used the tetrahedral hypothesis which had been first published in 1875 by William Lowthian Green to explain the formation of the Earth's land masses. His distant cousin was Harvey Rexford Hitchcock (1800–1855), who was an early missionary to Hawaii. This led to a publication of a book the volcanoes of Hawaii.

Hitchcock was a founder of the Geological Society of America, and in 1883 vice-president of the American Association for the Advancement of Science. He left a collection of botanical specimens to the University of North Carolina Herbarium. Mount Hitchcock in California is named in his honor.

== Works ==
- Elementary Geology (1861, with E. Hitchcock)
- Mt. Washington in Winter (1871)
- "Footprints in the Rocks". Popular Science Monthly. Vol. 3. August 1873.
- "The World Before the Introduction of Life". Popular Science Monthly. Vol. 4. March 1874.
- "The Earlier Forms of Life". Popular Science Monthly. Vol. 10. January 1877.
- Atlas to Accompany the Report on the Geology of New Hampshire. Concord, New Hampshire: Edson C. Eastman. 1878.
- "North America in the Ice Period". Popular Science Monthly. Vol. 20. December 1881.
- Hawaii and its volcanoes. The Hawaiian Gazette Company. 1911. p. 302.
