= Mount Whitney Trail =

Hiking trail to the summit

Coordinates: 36°35′13″N 118°14′24″W

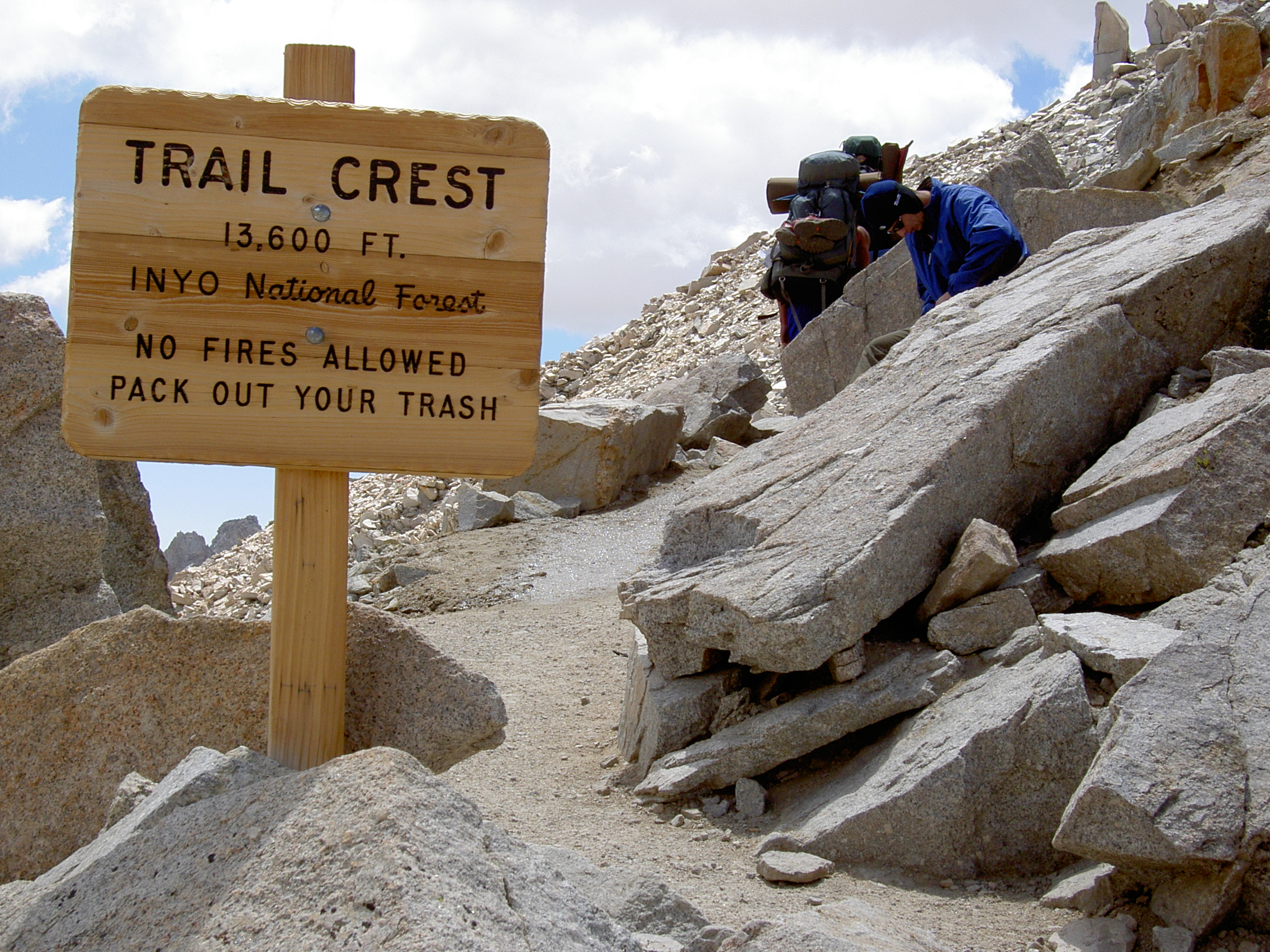
- Trail Crest, at 13,600 ft (4,150 m)
- Length: 11 mi (18 km)
- Location: Inyo National Forest, Inyo County, California
- Trailheads: Whitney Portal
- Use: Hiking
- Elevation change: 6,145 ft (1,873 m)
- Highest point: Mount Whitney, 14,505 ft (4,421 m)
- Lowest point: Whitney Portal, 8,360 ft (2,550 m)
- Difficulty: Strenuous
- Months: Peak season is May to November

The Mount Whitney Trail is a hiking trail that climbs Mount Whitney, the tallest peak in the contiguous United States. It starts at Whitney Portal, 13 miles (21 km) west of the town of Lone Pine, California. The hike is 21.4 mi (34.4 km) round trip, with an elevation gain of over 6,100 feet (1,860 m). It is a very popular trail during Summer and Fall when ice and snow are not present, and therefore its access is restricted by quotas from May to October. Access during non-peak months require permits from the United States National Forest, but quotas are not necessary.

== History ==
The original pack trail from Lone Pine to the summit of Mount Whitney was designed by local engineer Gustave Marsh. This original trail, opened on July 22, 1904, was the basis for most of today's Mount Whitney Trail.

== Route ==
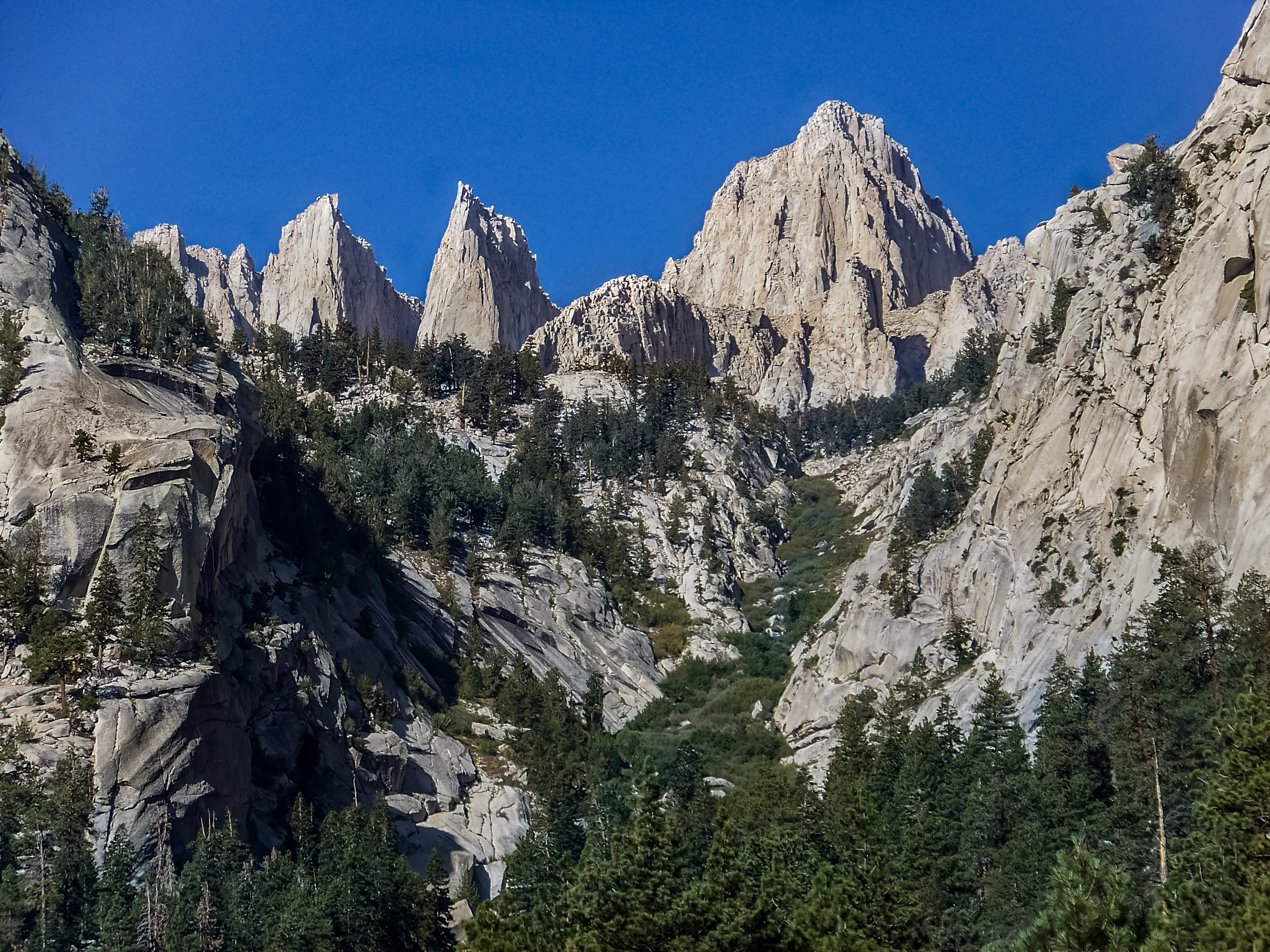
View of the summit from Whitney Portal, where the Mount Whitney Trail begins.

The Mount Whitney Trail starts at Whitney Portal. The 11-mile (18 km) long trail is non-technical when free of snow and ice, usually from July to late September, but is a strenuous hike that requires good physical fitness. The round-trip hike for healthy, fit individuals generally lasts about 12 to 14 hours.

The trail does not follow the most direct route used by mountaineers along the North Fork of Lone Pine Creek, but rather the easier grade along the main branch of Lone Pine Creek to its source. The trail continues along 97 switchbacks to the Sierra crest about 2.5 miles (4.0 km) south of the summit. The trail then traverses very close to the ridgeline until reaching the summit plateau. This longer route allows for a standard hiking trail with a modest gradient. During peak season the trail is well-maintained and easy to follow. The trail loses a small amount of elevation beyond Trail Crest that is gained on the return. In this final stretch of the trail, on the west side of Whitney's needle-like south ridge, some sections of the trail must be rebuilt after each winter. The views of the interior High Sierra from the ridgeline are expansive, due to the elevation and precipitous exposure. The trail ends at the Smithsonian Institution Shelter on the summit of Mount Whitney.

== Management ==
The Mount Whitney Trail, from above Lone Pine Lake to Trail Crest, lies within the special Mount Whitney Zone of the Inyo National Forest. Due to the high volume of trail users, the Forest Service enforces special regulations here to preserve Whitney's wild character. Wilderness permits are always required to use the trail, and between May 1 and November 1, a quota permits only 60 overnight users and 100 day users per day.

Beginning in 2012, the Mt. Whitney permit lottery switched over from mail-in applications to an online format.

=== Camping ===
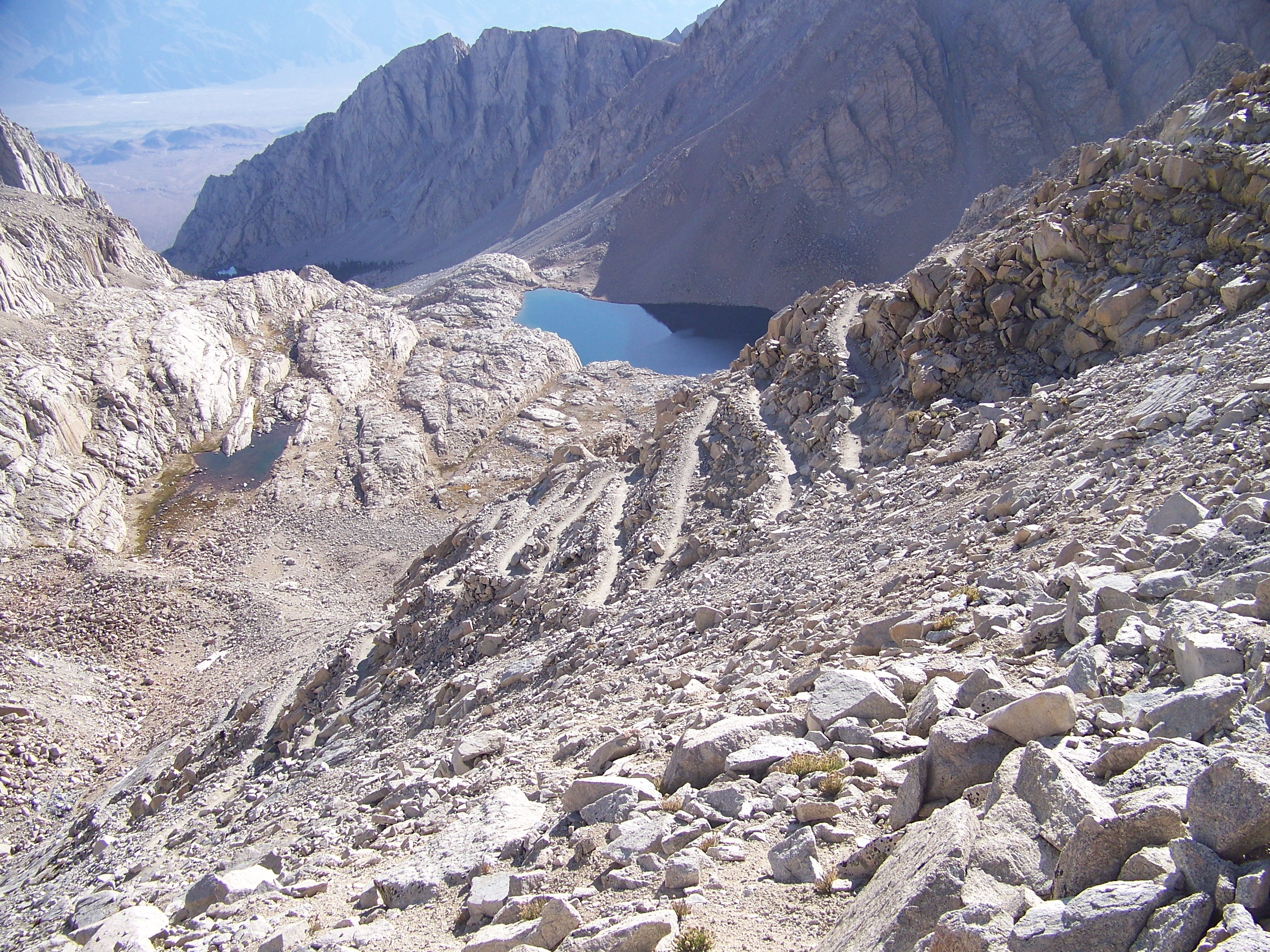
Some of the 99 switchbacks approaching Trail Crest. Trail Camp is adjacent to the small lake to the left.

Camping is allowed along most of the trail, more than 100 ft (30 m) from water, but level ground that meets that description is extremely limited, so most backpackers congregate in two camps. Outpost Camp, the lower of the two camps, is 3.8 mi (6.1 km) by trail from Whitney Portal, at 10,365 ft (3,159 m). It is sheltered by trees, near a waterfall and Bighorn Meadow. Trail Camp is 6.3 mi (10.1 km) from the trail head at 12,000 ft (3,700 m), in a rocky, often windy, alpine basin. This is also the last place where there is a reliable water source. The lake at Trail Camp has algae from the human waste deposits and should be purified before drinking. Depending on conditions, clean water may be found in springs on the switchbacks. Most overnight backpackers will take between 2 and 4 days to complete this trip.

=== Human waste ===
Human waste management was a major problem at Mount Whitney, and in 2006 the Inyo National Forest instituted a mandatory "pack it out" program. The Forest Service removed the solar latrines at Outpost Camp and Trail Camp, and instead began issuing "WAG Bags" (Waste Alleviation and Gelling) to trail users for human waste.

=== Bear canisters ===
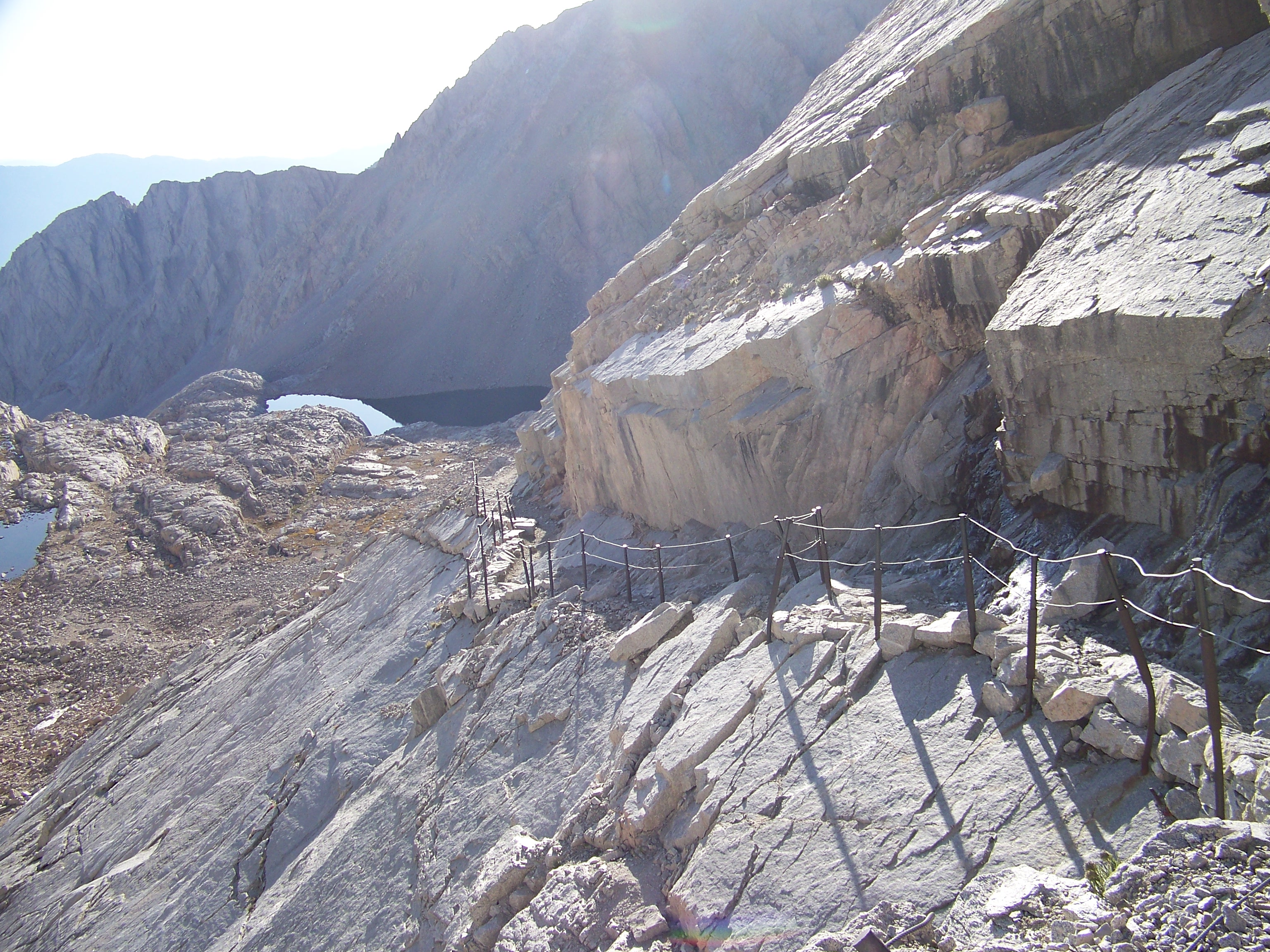
One steep section of the Mount Whitney Trail is protected by cable handrails

From May 25 to October 31, backpackers are required to carry a bear-resistant canister; these can be rented at the Interagency Visitor Center south of Lone Pine or the Whitney Portal Store for a nominal fee. Black bears are common along the Mount Whitney Trail. Night sightings of these bears are not unusual. When traveling at night, hikers are advised to wield a bright headlight and a shrill whistle; making many strange, loud noises will alert the bears to human presence. If possible, hikers should travel in a larger group as bears are much less likely to approach a group than a single person.

== Weather ==
The High Sierra, including Mount Whitney, has unpredictable weather patterns. Thunderstorms and lightning are a frequent occurrence at the peak on summer afternoons.
