= Trail Crest =

Low point at 13,645-foot elevation on a hiking route up Mount Whitney

Coordinates: 36°33′33″N 118°17′29″W

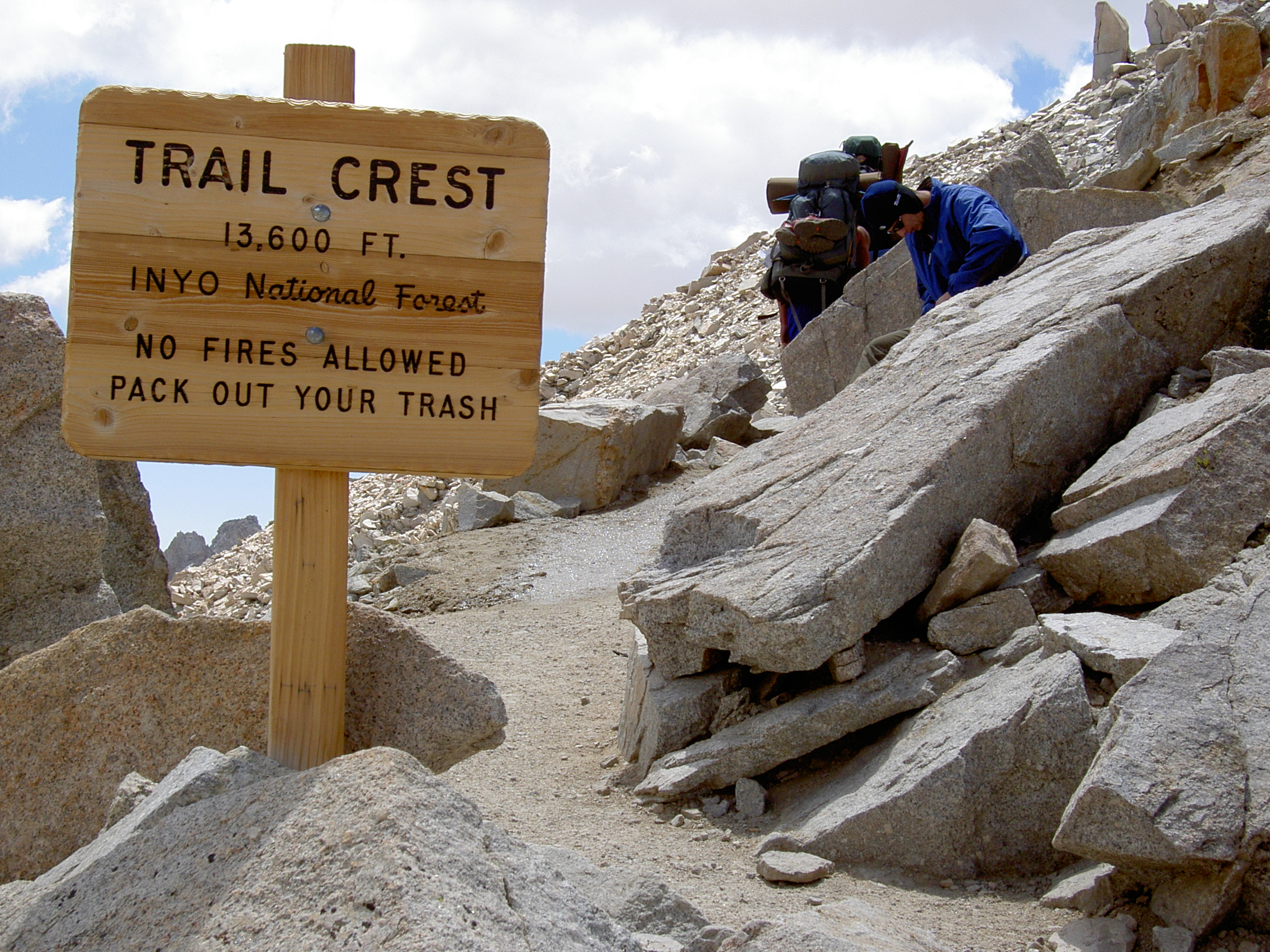

Trail Crest is a mountain trail pass on the Mount Whitney Trail that crosses the Sierra Crest. East of the pass are 97 switchbacks leading down to Trail Camp in Inyo National Forest. West of the pass is Sequoia National Park and the trail leading 2 miles (3.2 km) north to the summit of Mount Whitney.

Trail Crest, at an elevation of 13,645 feet (4,159 m), is the highest trail pass in the United States.
