= William Lowthian Green =

English adventurer & merchant (1819–1890)

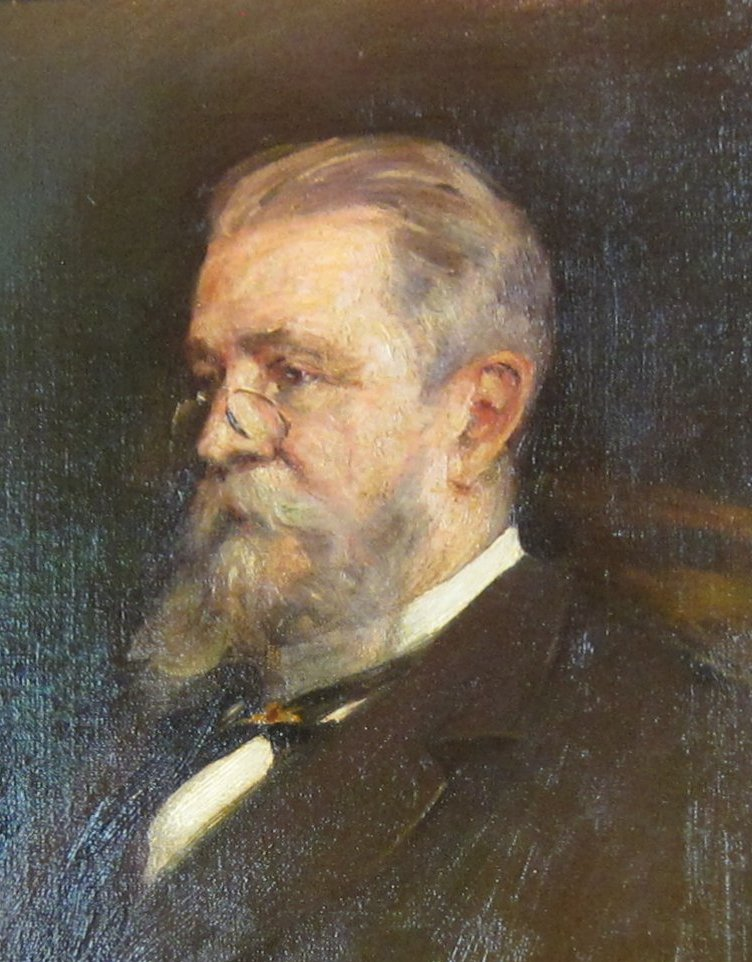
- Portrait by Frederic Yates

Minister of Foreign Affairs
- In office 17 February 1874 – 5 December 1876
- Monarch: Kalākaua
- Preceded by: Charles Reed Bishop
- Succeeded by: Henry A. P. Carter
- In office 22 September 1880 – 20 May 1882
- Preceded by: John Edward Bush
- Succeeded by: Walter M. Gibson

Minister of Finance
- In office 1 July 1887 – 22 July 1889
- Preceded by: Paul P. Kanoa
- Succeeded by: Samuel Mills Damon

Prime Minister of Hawaii
- In office 29 September 1880 – 20 May 1882
- Monarch: Kalākaua
- Preceded by: Kekūanaōʻa (as Kuhina Nui)
- Succeeded by: Walter M. Gibson

Personal details
- Born: 13 September 1819 London
- Died: 7 December 1890 (aged 71) Honolulu
- Spouse: Anna McKibben
- Occupation: Businessman, diplomat

William Lowthian Green (13 September 1819 – 7 December 1890) was an English adventurer and merchant who later became cabinet minister in the Kingdom of Hawaii. As an amateur geologist, he published a theory of the formation of the Earth called the tetrahedral hypothesis.

== Life ==
Green was born in Doughty Street in London on 13 September 1819. His mother, Mary Childs, was from the Lothian region of Scotland. His father, Joseph Green, was apprenticed to an early scientific instrument maker, Jesse Ramsden, and then started a successful merchandise business in northern England. His father was a distant relation to Charles Green, who was astronomer on James Cook's voyage of 1768.

Green was educated privately in Liverpool and at King William's College on the Isle of Man. As a young man continuing his father's business he sailed to Buenos Aires in Argentina. He crossed the Pampas plain and then the Andes mountains on horseback. By 1844 he returned to Liverpool, but by that time his father had died.

=== Adventure ===
His next venture was building one of the first screw steamships to reach South America from England. His small ship Flecha was not a business success, however. In 1849 he joined the California Gold Rush. By 1850 he had lost his fortune, and hired as a common sailor bound for China. He got as far as Honolulu in the Hawaiian Islands where Robert Cheshire Janion hired him into the firm of Starkey, Janion & Company. Green became a partner and the company was known as Janion, Green & Company. By 1851 he founded and became first president of a social club for British residents he called "The Mess". It was later renamed The Pacific Club.

After David M. Weston's Honolulu Iron Works building burned down, he took over the business in 1860 with Thomas Hughes. His company imported machinery from American factories for use in sugar plantations in Hawaii. In Honolulu in January 1862 Green married Anna McKibben, daughter of Robert McKibben, a physician at the Queen's Hospital. They had a daughter, Mary E. Green, who married J. N. A. Williams, and a son who died young. Prior to this marriage, Green had two children, a daughter, Elizabeth K. Green, who married George Douglas Freeth, Sr., and a son, William Green, with a Hawaiian woman, Lapeka. Green left Janion around 1867, and the English investor Theophilus Harris Davies then had to travel from London to bail out the company. The company was renamed Theo H. Davies & Co., and Green went into business by himself.

Green served as acting British consul in 1859 after the health failed of both William Miller and his replacement Busvargus Toup Nicolas (1819–1859), and again between William W. F. Synge (1826–1891) and James H. Wodehouse.

=== Politics ===
On 17 February 1874, he was appointed minister of foreign affairs, replacing Charles Reed Bishop. A major milestone of his administration was ratifying the Reciprocity Treaty of 1875 with the United States on 17 June 1876, which was also signed by Ulysses S. Grant. It had been negotiated for a long time by Elisha Hunt Allen and Henry A. P. Carter. He served until 5 December 1876, when Carter replaced him. He was appointed again as minister of foreign affairs on 22 September 1880, and served until 20 May 1882. In 1880, he was appointed to the position of Prime Minister; a position that had not been used since the abolition of the Kuhina Nui in 1864. He filled in as acting minister of the interior from 28 May to 31 October 1874. At that time he was replaced by Walter M. Gibson.

After Gibson fell from power the 1887 Constitution of the Kingdom of Hawaii was imposed by force. This gave it the name "Bayonet Constitution". Green was told to form a new cabinet; he included Lorrin A. Thurston, a leader of the bloodless coup, as minister of interior. Green became minister of finance on 1 July 1887, and served until 22 July 1889 when his health started to fail.

=== Geology ===
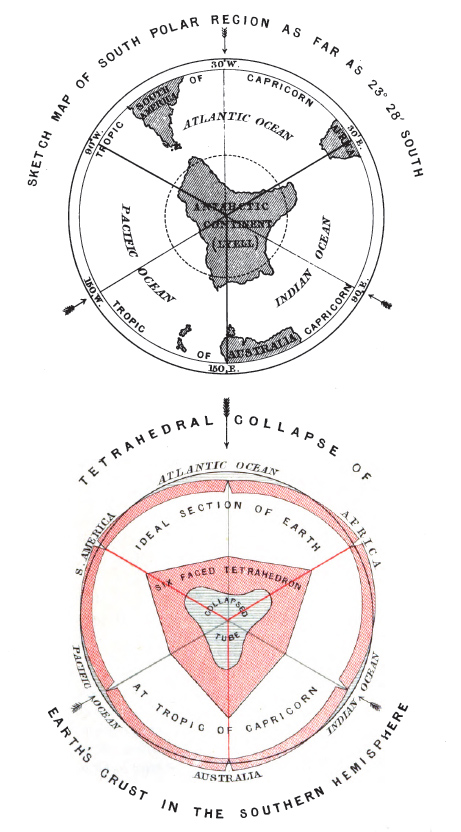
Illustration of the tetrahedral hypothesis from his 1875 book

Green was fascinated by the volcanoes in the Hawaiian islands. By 1855 he wrote a series of articles on local geology in the Sandwich Islands Monthly newspaper of Abraham Fornander. His ideas on the formation of the Earth, based on the nebular hypothesis of Pierre-Simon Laplace, shocked the local conservatives who literally believed in creation according to Genesis. In 1857 he published an article in the Edinburgh New Philosophical Journal based on the theory of Jean-Baptiste Élie de Beaumont. In 1859 he went on expeditions to view the erupting Mauna Loa and nearby Kīlauea and Hualālai on Hawaiʻi island. He hosted the adventurer Isabella Bird when she came to visit, and gave her a tour of the volcanoes.

His first book on his tetrahedral hypothesis was published in 1875. It was "...a work which was neglected or ridiculed at the time of its appearance." The journal Nature published only a one-line notice for the book. He published a second volume in 1887 concentrating on volcanic phenomena. This time the Nature journal published three sentences.

As his health failed he dictated a criticism of the work of James Dwight Dana. Green died at his home in Honolulu on 7 December 1890. His theory became more widely discussed into the first decades of the 20th century. For example, the French geologist Albert Auguste Cochon de Lapparent mentioned Green's work in his textbook. The American geologist Charles Henry Hitchcock, in his own 1911 book on the Hawaiian volcanoes, said:

The memory of William Lowthian Green will be honored henceforth because of his success in showing why the Earth has assumed its present relief.

Théophile Moreux said observations "...point more and more to the truth of an old theory which was long ignored." In their textbooks, Archibald Geikie and Arthur Holmes called the theory '"ingenious". But by the late 1920s Holmes was promoting theories of continental drift as proposed by Alfred Wegener, which evolved into concepts of plate tectonics. Modern theories view the current continental configurations as only transitory, so give no special role to the tetrahedral shape. However, they do attribute a large influence to volcanic activity as he suggested.

== Works ==
- "Extinct coast craters of Oahu". Sandwich Island Monthly. April–June 1856.
- Green, William Lowthian (1857). "On the cause of the pyramidal form of the outline of the southern extremities of the great continents and peninsulas of the globe". Edinburgh New Philosophical Journal.
- William Lowthian Green (1875). Vestiges of the Molten Globe, as Exhibited in the Figure of the Earth, Volcanic Action and Physiography. Vol. Part I. London: E. Stanford. OCLC 3571917.
- Green, William Lowthian (1877). "The Hawaiian Islands on the Reseau triangulaire". Letter to William T. Brigham
- "The Southern tendency of peninsulas in connection with the remarkable preponderance of ocean in the southern hemisphere". 1877. Letter to Sir John Lubbock
- Green, William Lowthian (1884). The volcanic problem from the point of view of Hawaiian volcanoes.
- William Lowthian Green (1887). Vestiges of the Molten Globe: The Earth's Surface Features and Volcanic Phenomena. Vol. Part II. Honolulu: Hawaiian Gazette Publishing Company.
- William Lowthian Green (1890). Notice of Prof. Jas. D. Dana's "Characteristics of volcanoes". Hawaiian gazette company press.

== See also ==
- Hawaii hotspot
- Evolution of Hawaiian volcanoes
- List of bilateral treaties signed by the Kingdom of Hawaii

Government offices
Preceded by Charles Reed Bishop	Kingdom of Hawaii Minister of Foreign Affairs; 1874–1876	Succeeded by Henry A. P. Carter
Preceded by Hermann A. Widemann	Acting Kingdom of Hawaii Minister of Interior; May 1874 – October 1874	Succeeded by William Luther Moehonua
Preceded by John Edward Bush	Kingdom of Hawaii Minister of Foreign Affairs; 1880–1882	Succeeded by Walter M. Gibson
Preceded by Paul P. Kanoa	Kingdom of Hawaii Minister of Finance; 1887–1889	Succeeded by Samuel Mills Damon
Preceded by Walter M. Gibson	Kingdom of Hawaii Minister of Foreign Affairs; 1887-1887	Succeeded by Jonathan Austin
