= Smithsonian Institution Shelter =

Cabin atop Mt. Whitney, California, USA

- U.S. National Register of Historic Places
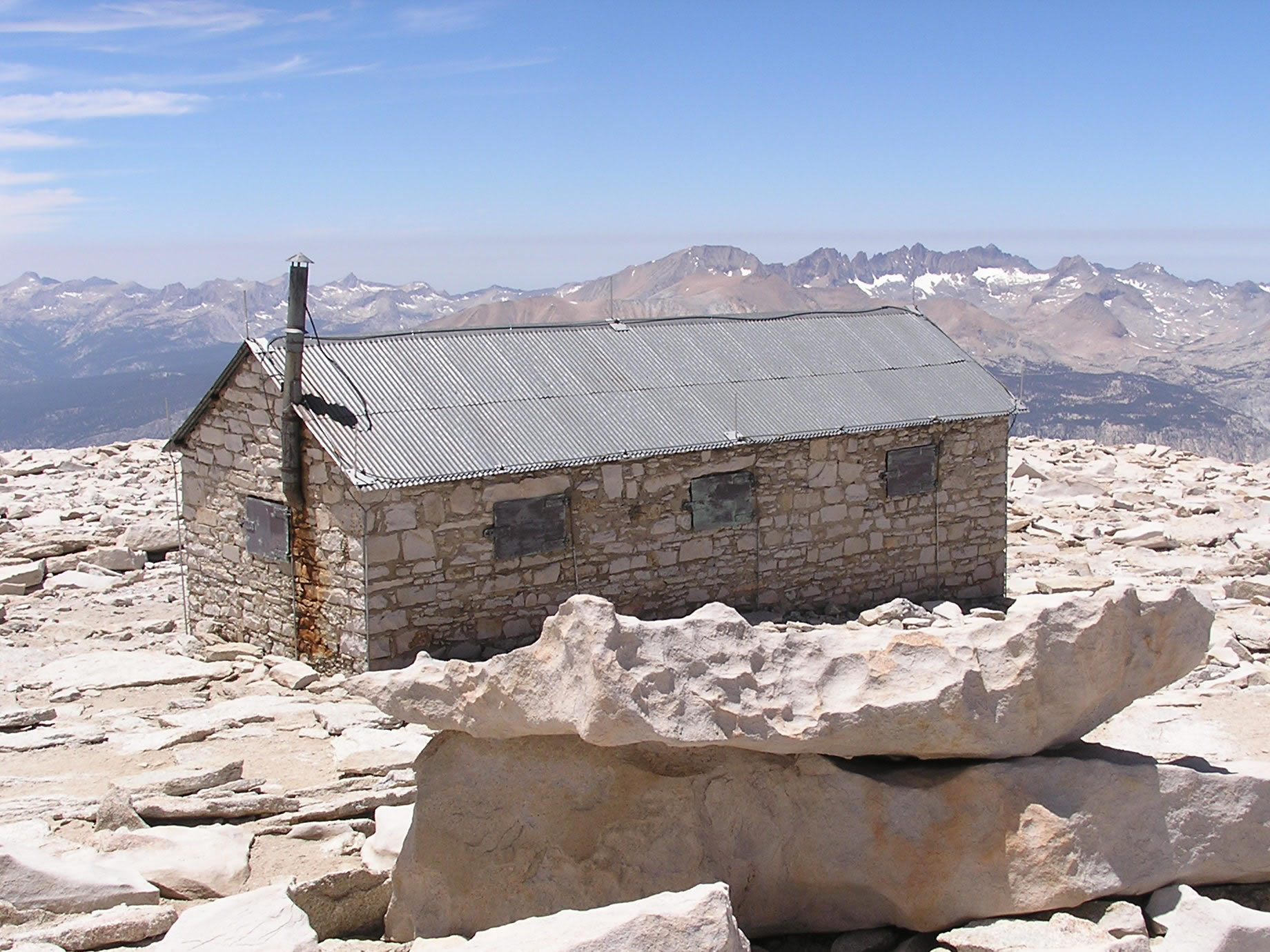
- The Smithsonian Institution Shelter, against the backdrop of the Sierra.

- Location within California Location within the United States
- Nearest city: Lone Pine, California
- Coordinates: 36°34′43″N 118°17′32″W
- Built: 1909
- Architect: Arch, Speiden & Speiden
- Architectural style: Rustic architecture
- NRHP reference No.: 77000119
- Added to NRHP: March 08, 1977

The Smithsonian Institution Shelter, also known as the Mount Whitney Summit Shelter and the Mount Whitney Hut, was built in 1909 on the summit plateau of Mount Whitney, in the Sierra Nevada within Sequoia National Park, in California. It is the highest permanent building in the contiguous United States.

== History ==
The shelter at the summit was proposed after Byrd Surby, a U.S. Fisheries employee, was killed by lightning on the summit in 1904. It was built to house scientists who used the 14,505-foot (4,421 m) summit to study high-altitude phenomena in the era before sustained high-altitude flight became feasible. Samuel Pierpont Langley recommended this location to the government as a prime spot for an observatory following an expedition in the area. Plans to establish a summit shelter were made in 1908.

In 1909, the site was utilized by Charles Greeley Abbot, the director of the Smithsonian Astrophysical Observatory, to conduct spectroscopic observations of Mars, aiming to investigate the presence of water on the planet. Other studies conducted at the site included observations of cosmic rays and nocturnal radiation.

Although the structure was built in part as a shelter from storms, hikers are now warned against seeking shelter there during lightning storms.

== Landmark ==
Gustave F. Marsh, the builder of the summit trail, built the shelter with funding from the Smithsonian Institution, with assistance from the Lick Observatory. The mortared granite shelter comprises three rooms in a line with windows in each and doors in the north and south rooms. The roof is corrugated metal on a steel truss frame. The materials to build the shelter were carried to the summit by donkeys. The shelter has a log book that hikers may sign. The site has been considered for National Historic Landmark status, but has not been recommended for submission yet. However, in 1977 the Smithsonian Institution Shelter was placed on the National Register of Historic Places.
