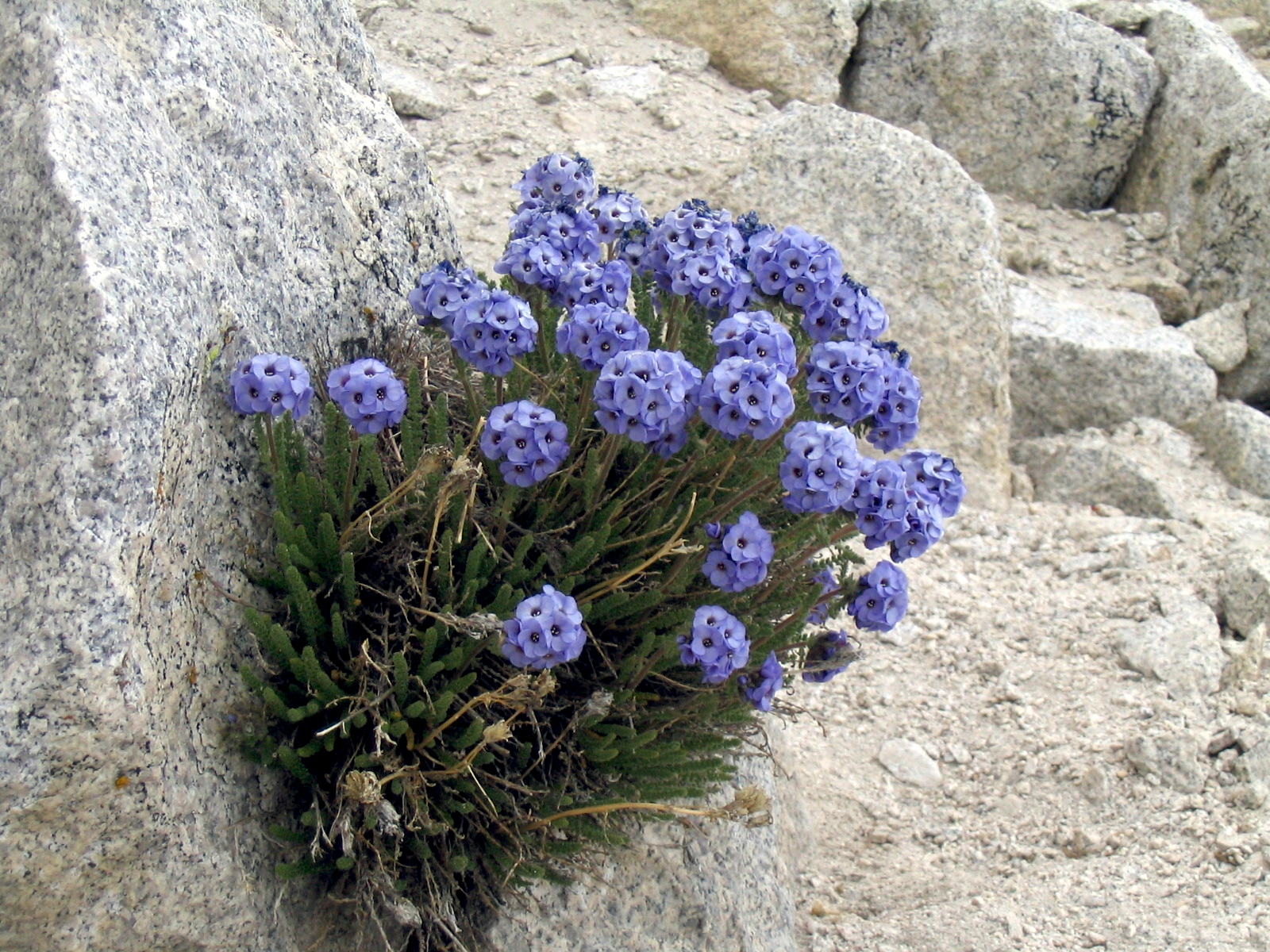

Conservation status
- Vulnerable (NatureServe)

Scientific classification
- Kingdom: Plantae
- Clade: Embryophytes
- Clade: Tracheophytes
- Clade: Angiosperms
- Clade: Eudicots
- Clade: Asterids
- Order: Ericales
- Family: Polemoniaceae
- Genus: Polemonium
- Species: P. eximium

Binomial name
- Polemonium eximium Greene

= Polemonium eximium =

Species of flowering plant

Polemonium eximium, the skypilot or showy sky pilot, is a perennial plant in the phlox family (Polemoniaceae) that grows at high altitudes (mostly above 10,000 feet (3,000 m)). It is endemic to the Sierra Nevada in California where it grows in the talus of the high mountain slopes.

Wildflower enthusiasts consider it to be among the best of the Sierra wildflowers, and highly rewarding to find.

== Habitat and range ==
It mostly occurs at elevations from 10,000 to 14,000 feet (3,000 to 4,300 m) in the Central and Southern Sierra Nevada. It mostly occurs in colonies in stark surroundings, above 10,000 feet (3,000 m), in rocky areas that appear mostly devoid of soil, and rarely in association with other plants.

Most notably, it can be found at the upper reaches of Mt. Whitney, both via the main trail and mountaineer's route, as well as the southern flanks of Mt Langley in the Inyo National Forest. Additionally, it resides near the summit of Mount Dana in Yosemite National Park.

== Description ==
=== Growth pattern ===
It is a sticky, aromatic smelling, 4 to 16 inches (10 to 41 cm) tall perennial plant with a woody base, from which grows clumps of erect stems.

=== Leaves and stems ===
Basal leaves are glandular-hairy, 4–13 centimetres (1.6–5.1 in) long, and 4–9 centimetres (1.6–3.5 in) wide, each made up of 20–35 leaflets, which in turn are subdivided into 3–5 lobes.

== Inflorescence and fruit ==
The showy inflorescence is a crowded head of many flowers. The bright deep blue to whitish-blue to pink-lavender flowers are fragrant. Each flower has a tubular calyx of hairy sepals and a funnel-shaped corolla spreading to lobes. The flowers are at full bloom for approximately one day apiece in the very short period of appropriate flowering conditions. The plant has a strong scent reminiscent of urine which attracts pollinators to its short-lived flowers. It blooms from June to August.
