= Whitney Portal, California =

Unincorporated community in California, United States

Whitney Portal
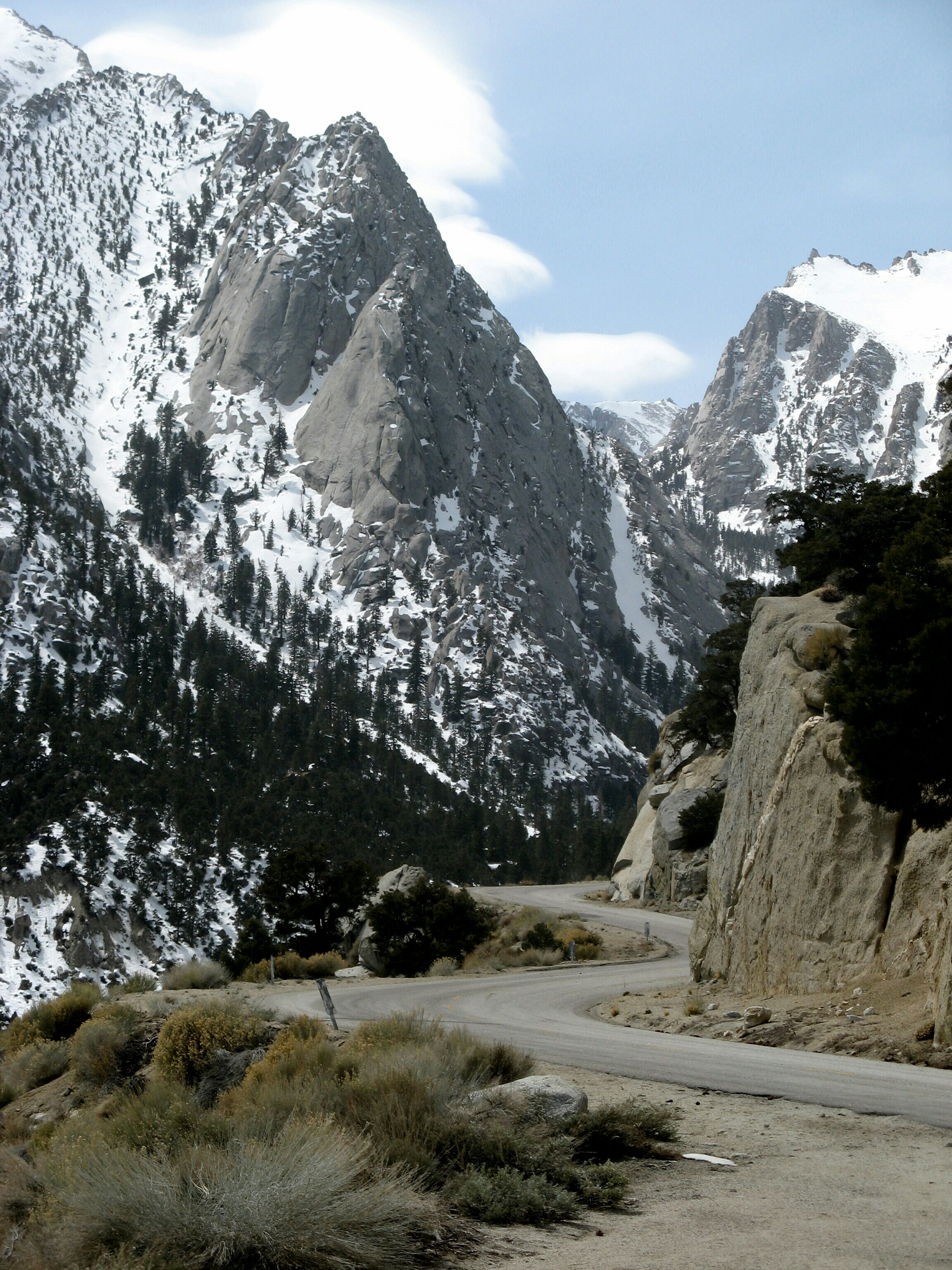
- Whitney Portal Road approaches Whitney Portal

- Location in California
- Coordinates: 36°35′10″N 118°14′29″W
- Country: United States
- State: California
- County: Inyo County
- Elevation: 8,374 ft (2,552 m)

Whitney Portal (formerly Hunter Flat and Hunters Camp) is the end of the Whitney Portal road in Inyo County, California, 13.7 miles (22 km) west of Lone Pine at an elevation of 8,374 feet (2,552 m). Whitney Portal is the gateway to Mount Whitney, the highest point in the contiguous United States; it is the trailhead for the Mount Whitney Trail. It is also the trailhead for mountaineering routes such as the East Face (Mount Whitney), first climbed in 1931, and the Mountaineer's Route, first climbed by John Muir in 1873.

Campgrounds, parking lots, bearproof food storage facilities, a store and a restaurant are located at Whitney Portal. The restaurant is known for serving "obscenely large pancakes, one-inch thick and large enough to be a hubcab on a tractor", as well as a variety of burgers, fries and beers.

== History ==
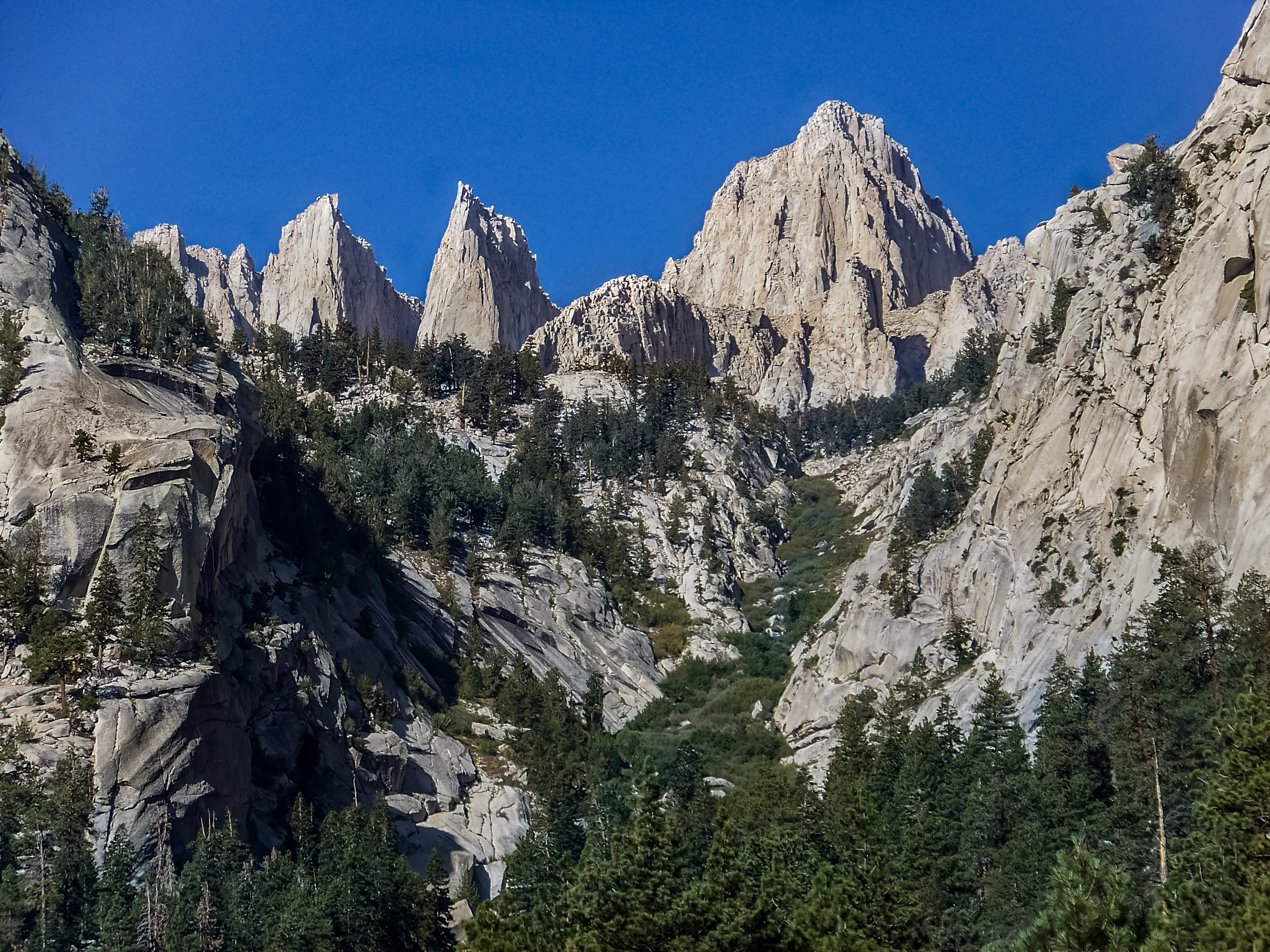
View of Mount Whitney from Whitney Portal

A road reached Whitney Portal in 1936. Previously, the place was called Hunter Flat in honor of William L. Hunter, an Owens Valley pioneer.

== In media ==
The road has appeared in scenes in several feature films and television shows:

- High Sierra (1941) with Humphrey Bogart and Ida Lupino
- The Long, Long Trailer (1954) with Lucille Ball and Desi Arnaz
- Star Trek: Deep Space Nine -"The Ascent"
