= Mount Whitney =

Highest mountain in the contiguous United States

- Tumanguya
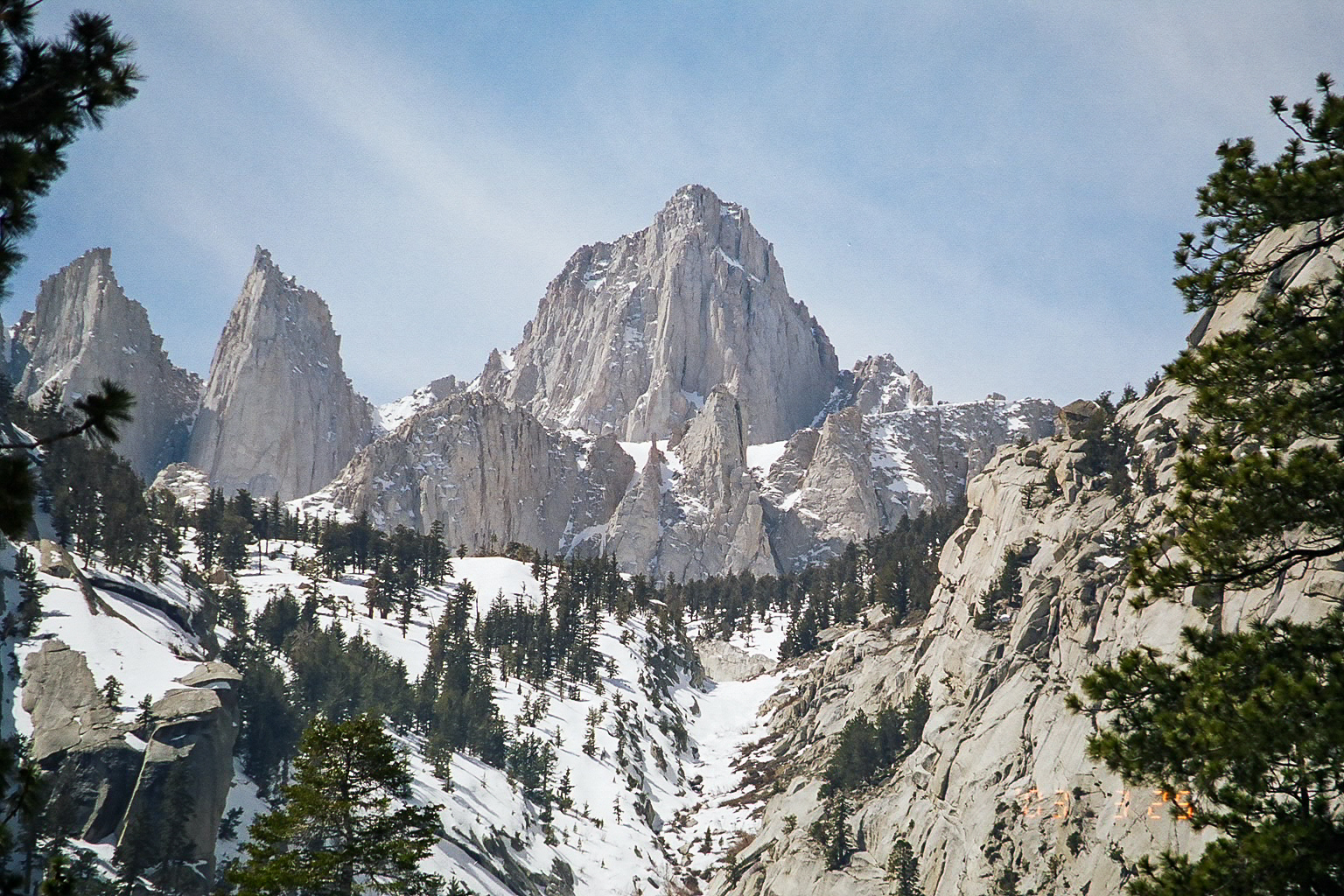
- East Face close-up seen from the Whitney Portal

Highest point
- Elevation: 14,505 ft (4,421 m) NAVD 88
- Prominence: 10,075 ft (3,071 m)
- Parent peak: Pico de Orizaba
- Isolation: 1,647 mi (2,651 km)
- Listing: World's most prominent peaks 81st; World's most isolated peaks 18th; North America's highest peaks 24th; North America's prominent peaks 16th; North America's isolated peaks 4th; U.S. state high point 2nd; U.S. highest major peaks 11th; California's highest major peaks 1st; California fourteeners 1st; Ultra-prominent peak
- Coordinates: 36°34′43″N 118°17′31″W

Naming
- Etymology: Josiah Whitney

Geography
- Location within California Location within the United States
- Location: Sequoia National Park; Inyo National Forest; Sequoia-Kings Canyon Wilderness; John Muir Wilderness; Inyo and Tulare counties, California, U.S.
- Parent range: Sierra Nevada
- Topo map: USGS Mount Whitney

Geology
- Rock age: Cretaceous
- Mountain type: Granite

Climbing
- First ascent: August 18, 1873 by Charles Begole, Albert Johnson, and John Lucas
- Easiest route: Mount Whitney Trail (class 1)

Mount Whitney (Paiute: Tumanguya) is a mountain in California's Sierra Nevada range, and is the highest point in the contiguous United States, with an elevation of 14,505 feet (4,421 m). It is located in East–Central California along the border of Inyo and Tulare counties. The mountain's west slope is in Sequoia National Park and the summit is the southern terminus of the John Muir Trail, which runs 211.9 mi (341.0 km) from Happy Isles in Yosemite Valley. The eastern slopes are in Inyo National Forest in Inyo County. Mount Whitney is ranked 18th by topographic isolation and 81st by prominence on Earth. It is the tallest mountain in the United States outside of Alaska.

== Geography ==
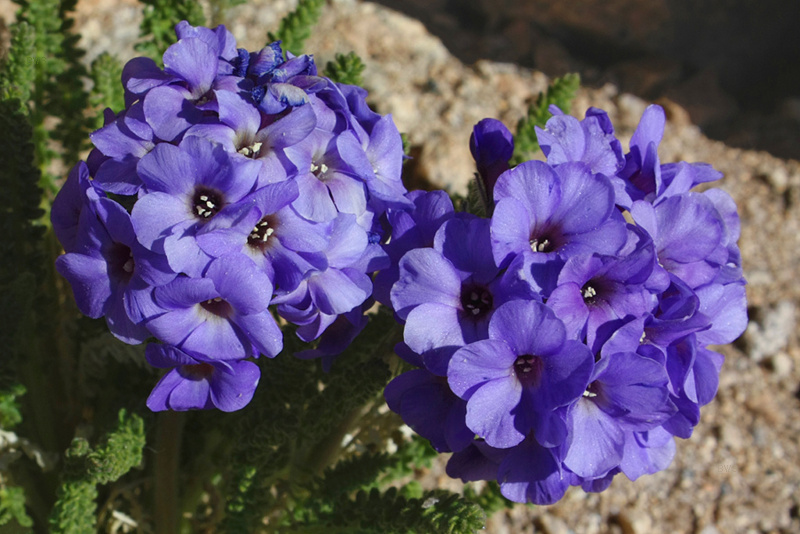
Sky pilot blooming on ridge just below summit

Mount Whitney's summit is on the Sierra Crest and the Great Basin Divide. It lies near many of the Sierra Nevada's highest peaks. The peak rises dramatically above the Owens Valley, sitting 10,778 feet (3,285 m) or just over 2 mi (3.2 km) above the town of Lone Pine 15 mi (24 km) to the east, in the Owens Valley. It rises more gradually on the west side, lying only about 3,000 feet (914 m) above the John Muir Trail at Guitar Lake.

The mountain is partially dome-shaped, with its famously jagged ridges extending to the sides. Mount Whitney is above the tree line and has an alpine climate and ecology. Very few plants grow near the summit: one example is the sky pilot, a cushion plant that grows low to the ground. The only animals are transient, such as the butterfly Parnassius phoebus and the gray-crowned rosy finch.

=== Hydrology ===
The mountain is the highest point on the Great Basin Divide. Waterways on the peak's west side flow into Whitney Creek, which flows into the Kern River. The Kern River terminates at Bakersfield in the Tulare Basin, the southern part of the San Joaquin Valley. Today, the water in the Tulare Basin is largely diverted for agriculture. Historically, during very wet years, water overflowed from the Tulare Basin into the San Joaquin River, which flows to the Pacific Ocean.

From the east, water from Mount Whitney flows to Lone Pine Creek, where most of the water is diverted into the Los Angeles Aqueduct via a sluice. Some water in the creek is allowed to continue on its natural course, joining the Owens River, which terminates at Owens Lake, an endorheic lake of the Great Basin.

=== Elevation measurements ===
The estimated elevation of Mount Whitney's summit has changed over the years. The technology of elevation measurement has become more refined and, more importantly, the vertical coordinate system has changed. The peak was commonly said to be at 14,494 ft (4,418 m) and this is the elevation stamped on the USGS brass benchmark disk on the summit. An older plaque on the summit (sheet metal with black lettering on white enamel) reads "elevation 14,496.811 feet", but this was estimated using the older vertical datum (NGVD29) from 1929. Since then the shape of the Earth (the geoid) has been estimated more accurately. Using a new vertical datum established in 1988 (NAVD88) the benchmark is now estimated to be 14,504 ft (4,421 m).

=== Climate ===
Mount Whitney has an alpine tundra climate (ET) under the Köppen climate classification. Summer temperatures are highly variable, ranging from below freezing (32 °F (0 °C)) to highs near 80 °F (27 °C) during extreme heat waves in the Owens Valley.

Based on the range from the highest average high of 25.7 °F (−3.5 °C) to the lowest average low of 4.2 °F (−15.4 °C) for winter temperatures in the table (December to March), every 1 inch (25 mm) of liquid precipitation equates to approximately 15–40 inches (380–1,020 mm) of snow, with lower temperatures producing the greater snow depths.

There is no weather station at the summit, but this climate table contains interpolated data for an area below the summit.

Climate data for Mount Whitney 36.5728 N, 118.3025 W, Elevation: 13,635 ft (4,156 m) (1991–2020 normals)
Month	Jan	Feb	Mar	Apr	May	Jun	Jul	Aug	Sep	Oct	Nov	Dec	Year
Mean daily maximum °F (°C)	25.2 (−3.8)	23.0 (−5.0)	25.8 (−3.4)	31.2 (−0.4)	38.7 (3.7)	48.9 (9.4)	55.2 (12.9)	54.5 (12.5)	49.6 (9.8)	41.5 (5.3)	31.9 (−0.1)	24.3 (−4.3)	37.5 (3.1)
Daily mean °F (°C)	15.6 (−9.1)	13.1 (−10.5)	15.6 (−9.1)	19.6 (−6.9)	26.0 (−3.3)	35.2 (1.8)	41.2 (5.1)	40.5 (4.7)	36.8 (2.7)	30.4 (−0.9)	21.8 (−5.7)	15.2 (−9.3)	25.9 (−3.4)
Mean daily minimum °F (°C)	6.0 (−14.4)	3.3 (−15.9)	5.4 (−14.8)	8.0 (−13.3)	13.4 (−10.3)	21.6 (−5.8)	27.2 (−2.7)	26.5 (−3.1)	24.1 (−4.4)	19.2 (−7.1)	11.6 (−11.3)	6.2 (−14.3)	14.4 (−9.8)
Average precipitation inches (mm)	8.37 (213)	8.88 (226)	5.79 (147)	3.94 (100)	1.92 (49)	0.51 (13)	0.31 (7.9)	0.19 (4.8)	0.27 (6.9)	1.90 (48)	2.51 (64)	7.91 (201)	42.5 (1,080.6)
Source: PRISM Climate Group

== Geology ==
Schematic of Sierra Nevada fault block

Whitney's eastern slope is far steeper than its western because the Sierra Nevada is the result of a fault block anchored below the surface to the west and slowly rising on the east.

The rise is caused by a fault system that runs along the Sierra's eastern base, below Mount Whitney. The granite that forms Whitney, part of the Sierra Nevada Batholith, is the same as that of the Alabama Hills thousands of feet lower and to the east. The raising of Whitney (and the downdrop of the Owens Valley) is due to the same geological forces that cause the Basin and Range Province: the crust of much of the intermontane west is slowly being stretched.

In Cretaceous time, masses of molten rock that originated from subduction rose underneath what is now Whitney and solidified underground to form large expanses of granite. In the last 2 to 10 million years, the Sierra was pushed up, enabling glacial and river erosion to strip the upper layers of softer rock to reveal the resistant granite that makes up Mount Whitney.

About 50 to 60 million years ago, during the Cenozoic Era, tectonic uplifts began to form the present Sierra range. These uplifts tilted the region towards the southwest causing rivers to form. As the land continued to rise, rivers and streams cut deeper and carved out valleys.

== Exploration history ==
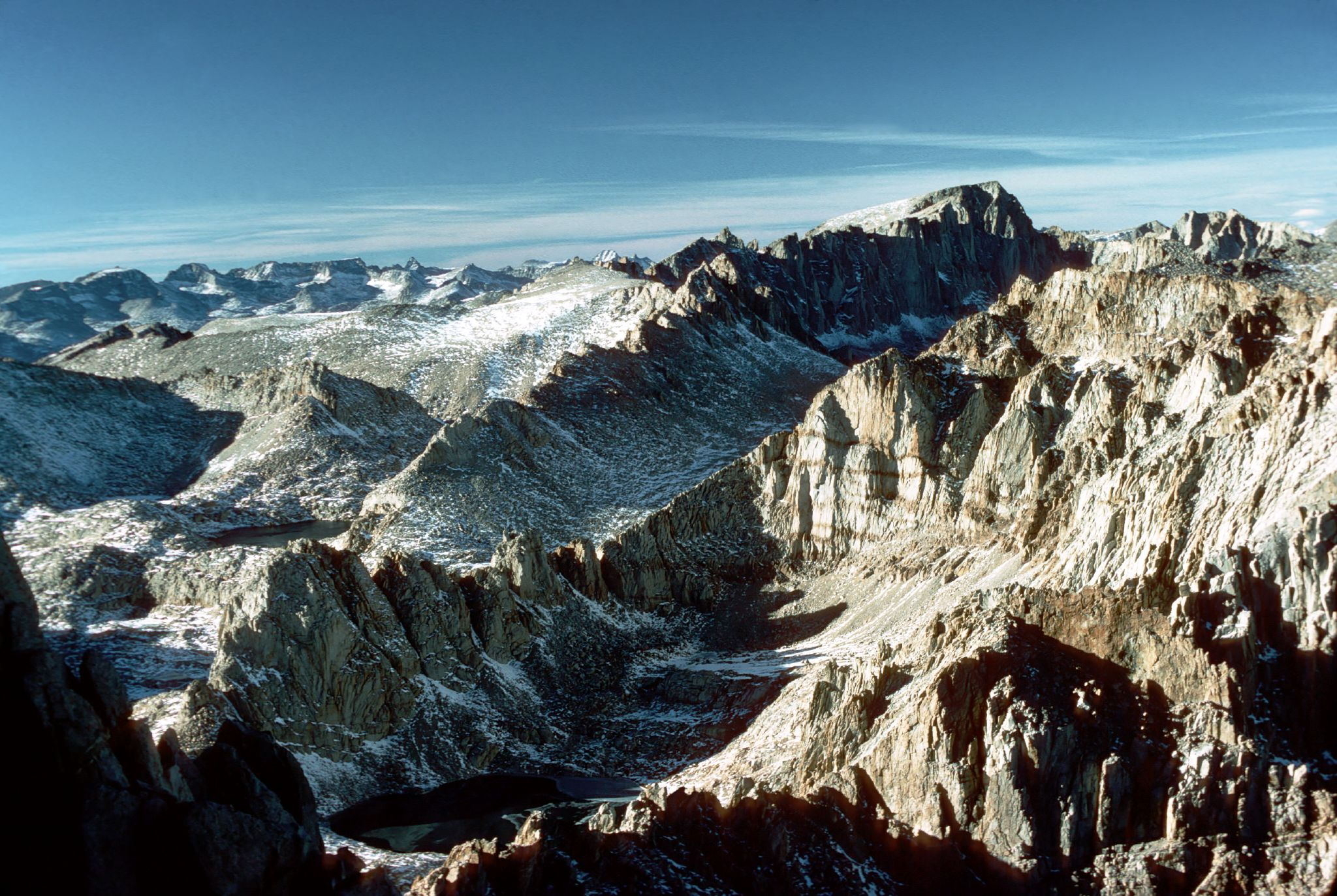
Mount Whitney as seen from Mount Langley

In July 1864, the members of the California Geological Survey named the peak, the contiguous United States' highest summit, after Josiah Whitney, the state geologist of California and sponsor of the survey. During the same expedition, geologist Clarence King attempted to climb Whitney from its west side, but stopped just short. In 1871, King returned to climb what he believed to be Whitney, but having taken a different approach, he actually summited nearby Mount Langley. Upon learning of his mistake in 1873, King finally completed his own first ascent of Whitney, but did so a month too late to be first. On August 18, 1873, Charles Begole, A. H. Johnson, and John Lucas, all of nearby Lone Pine, had become the first to reach the summit. As they climbed the mountain during a fishing trip to nearby Kern Canyon, they called the mountain Fisherman's Peak.

In 1881, Smithsonian Astrophysical Observatory founder Samuel Pierpont Langley remained on the summit for some time, making daily observations of the solar heat. Accompanying Langley in 1881 was another party consisting of Judge William B. Wallace of Visalia, W. A. Wright and Reverend Frederick Wales. In his memoirs, Wallace wrote, "The Pi Ute [Paiute] Indians called Mount Whitney Too-man-i-goo-yah, which means 'the very old man.' They believe that the Great Spirit who presides over the destiny of their people once had his home in that mountain." The spelling Too-man-i-goo-yah is a transliteration from the indigenous Paiute Mono language. Another variation is Too-man-go-yah.

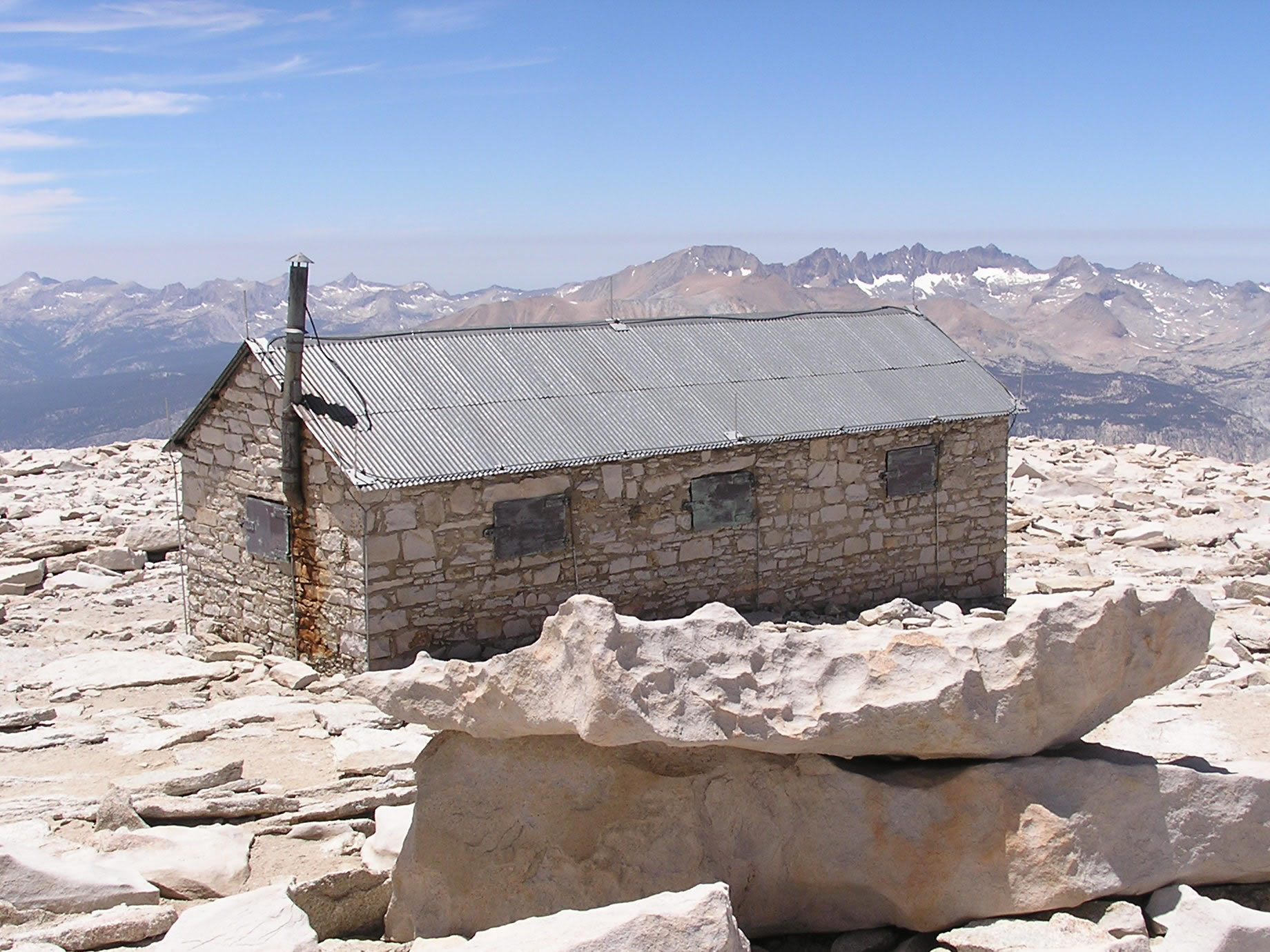
The Smithsonian Institution Shelter on Whitney's summit

In 1891, the United States Geological Survey's Board on Geographic Names decided to recognize the name Mount Whitney. Despite losing out on their preferred name, Lone Pine residents financed a trail to the summit, engineered by Gustave Marsh, and completed on July 22, 1904. Four days later, the new trail enabled the first recorded death on Whitney. Having hiked the trail, U.S. Bureau of Fisheries employee Byrd Surby was struck and killed by lightning while eating lunch on the summit. In response, Marsh began work on the stone hut that became the Smithsonian Institution Shelter, completing it in 1909.

Although Gustave Marsh is often credited for constructing the first trail to the peak of Mount Whitney, a lesser known trail to the peak was created by the Buffalo Soldiers, the first all-black Army regiments in peacetime, a year prior in 1903. In addition to creating trails, the Buffalo Soldiers fought fires, built fences, and kept illegal grazers away. Charles Young, a Buffalo Soldier officer, served as the acting military superintendent of Sequoia National Park (where Mount Whitney is located) in 1903. He is considered the first African-American superintendent of a national park. The Buffalo soldiers also built a wagon road into the Giant Forest which later became Generals Highway and is the modern day route for automobiles driving to Mount Whitney.

A movement began after World War II to rename the mountain for Winston Churchill, but the name Mount Whitney persisted.

== Climbing routes ==
=== Trails ===
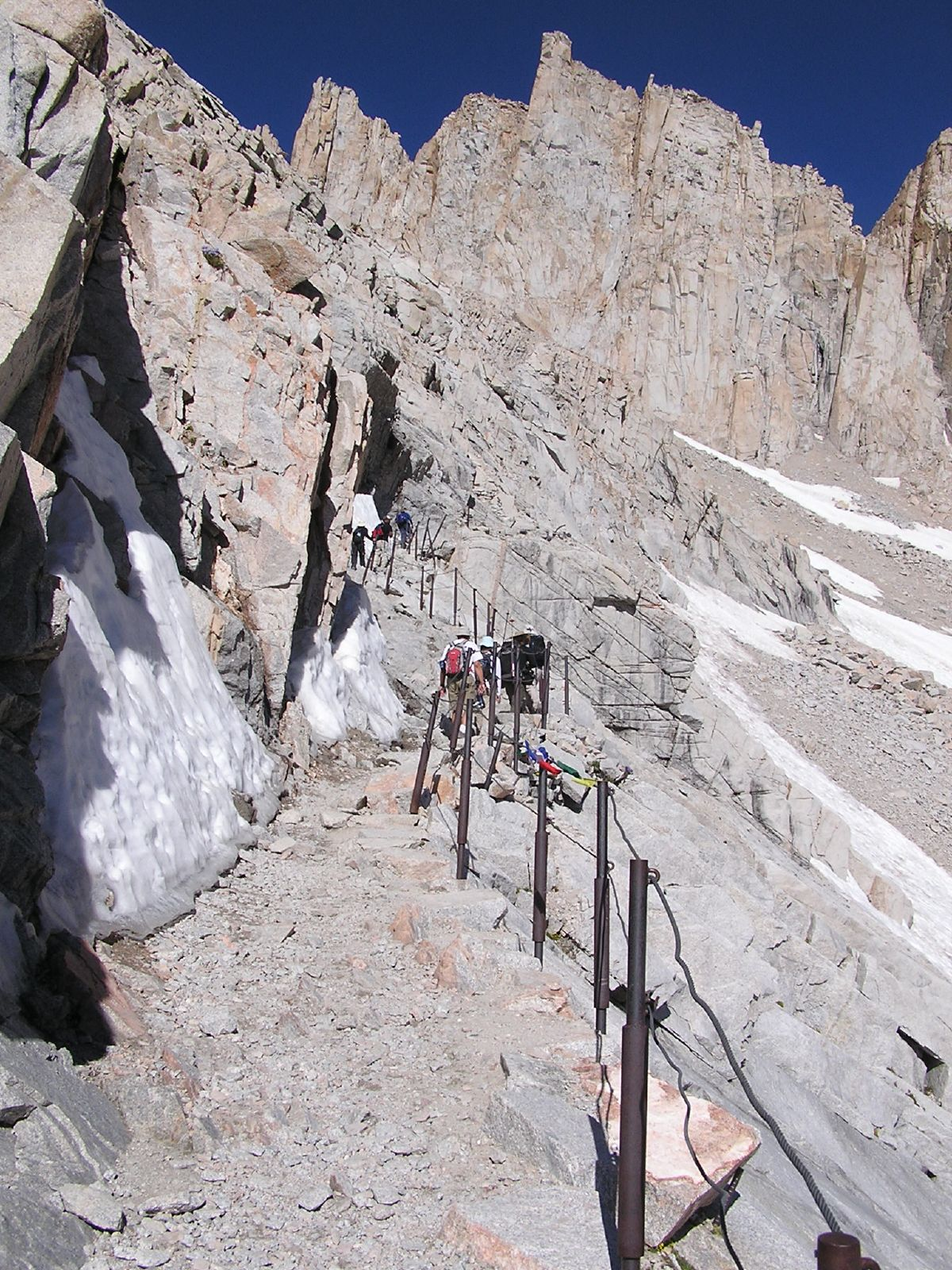
The Mount Whitney Trail

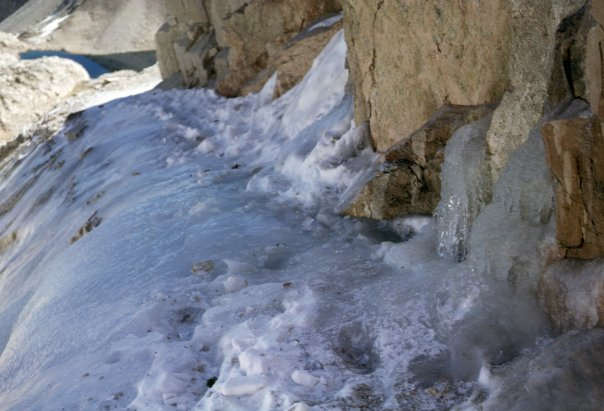
1962 before railings, opposite view, treacherous.

The most popular route to the summit is by way of the Mount Whitney Trail, which starts at Whitney Portal and incorporates the original path to the summit built by the Buffalo Soldiers, at an elevation of 8,360 ft (2,548 m), 13 mi (21 km) west of the town of Lone Pine. The hike is about 22 mi (35 km) round trip with an elevation gain of over 6,100 ft (1,859 m). Permits are required year-round, and to prevent overuse the Forest Service issues a limited number of permits between May 1 and November 1. It holds an annual lottery for hiking and backpacking permits on the trail. Applications are accepted from February 1 through March 15. Any permits left over after the lottery is completed typically go on sale April 1. Most hikers plan to stay one or two nights, camping along the route. Those in good physical condition sometimes attempt to reach the summit and return to Whitney Portal in one day. A one-day hike requires a day-use permit that prohibits the use of overnight camping gear (sleeping bag and tent). Day hikers often leave Whitney Portal before sunrise and hike for 12 to 18 hours.

Longer approaches to Whitney arrive at its west side, connecting to the Mount Whitney Trail near the summit by way of the John Muir Trail (Also referred to as Nüümü Poyo, an Indigenous Paiute name meaning "People's Trail").

=== Scrambles ===
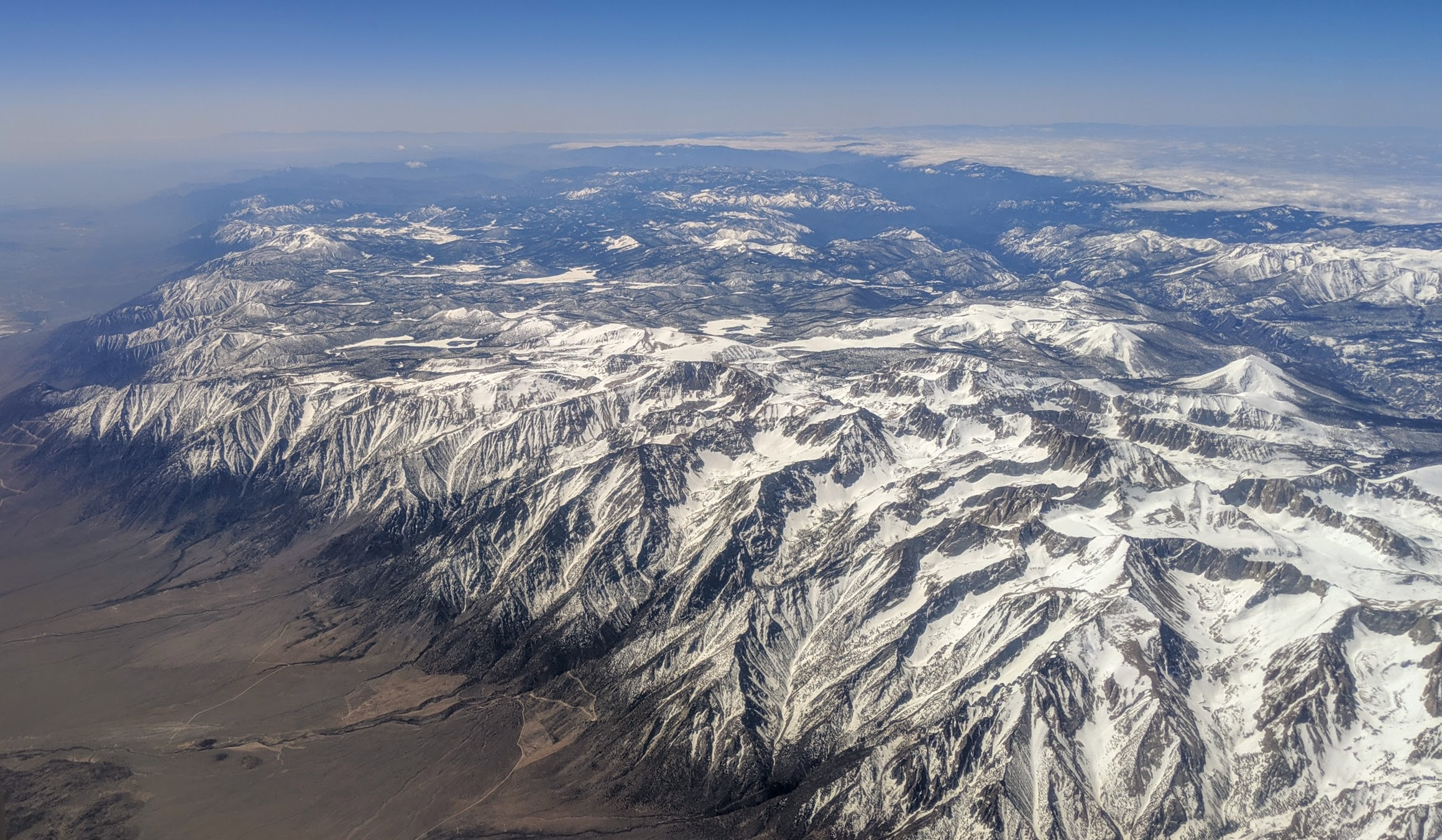
Aerial view of the Mount Whitney massif and the steep eastern side of the Sierra Nevada, from the north

The Mountaineer's Route, a gully on the north side of the east face first climbed by John Muir, is considered a scramble, class 3 (PD+). The fastest recorded time up this route to the summit and back to the portal is 3 hours 10 minutes, by Jason Lakey of Bishop, California.

=== Technical climbs ===
The steep eastern side of the mountain offers a variety of climbing challenges. The East Face route, first climbed in 1931, is one of the Fifty Classic Climbs of North America routes, and involves technical free climbing (class 5.7) but is mostly class 4. Other routes range up to grade 5.10d.

South of the main summit is a series of minor summits that are completely inconspicuous from the west but appear as a series of "needles" from the east. The routes on these include some of the finest big-wall climbing in the high Sierra. Two of the needles were named after participants in an 1880 scientific expedition to the mountain: Keeler Needle for James Keeler, and Day Needle for William Cathcart Day. The latter was renamed in 1990 by Congressional act as Crooks Peak after Hulda Crooks, who hiked up Mount Whitney every year until well into her nineties.

== See also ==
- List of California 14,000-foot summits
- List of California county high points
- List of mountain peaks of California
- List of the highest major summits of the United States
- List of the most isolated major summits of the United States
- List of the most prominent summits of the United States
- List of U.S. states by elevation
- Whitney Classic
