= Hawthorne Airport =

Hawthorne Airport may refer to:

- Hawthorne Municipal Airport (disambiguation)
  - Hawthorne Municipal Airport (California) or Jack Northrop Field in Hawthorne, California, United States (FAA: HHR)
  - Hawthorne Industrial Airport, formerly Hawthorne Municipal Airport in Hawthorne, Nevada, United States (FAA: HTH)
- Hawthorne-Feather Airpark in Deering, New Hampshire, United States (FAA: 8B1)
- Hawthorne Field in Kountze/Silsbee, Texas, United States (FAA: 45R)

== See also ==
- Hawthorne Municipal Airport (disambiguation)
