= Mount Carillon =

Mountain summit on the crest of the Sierra Nevada mountain range in California

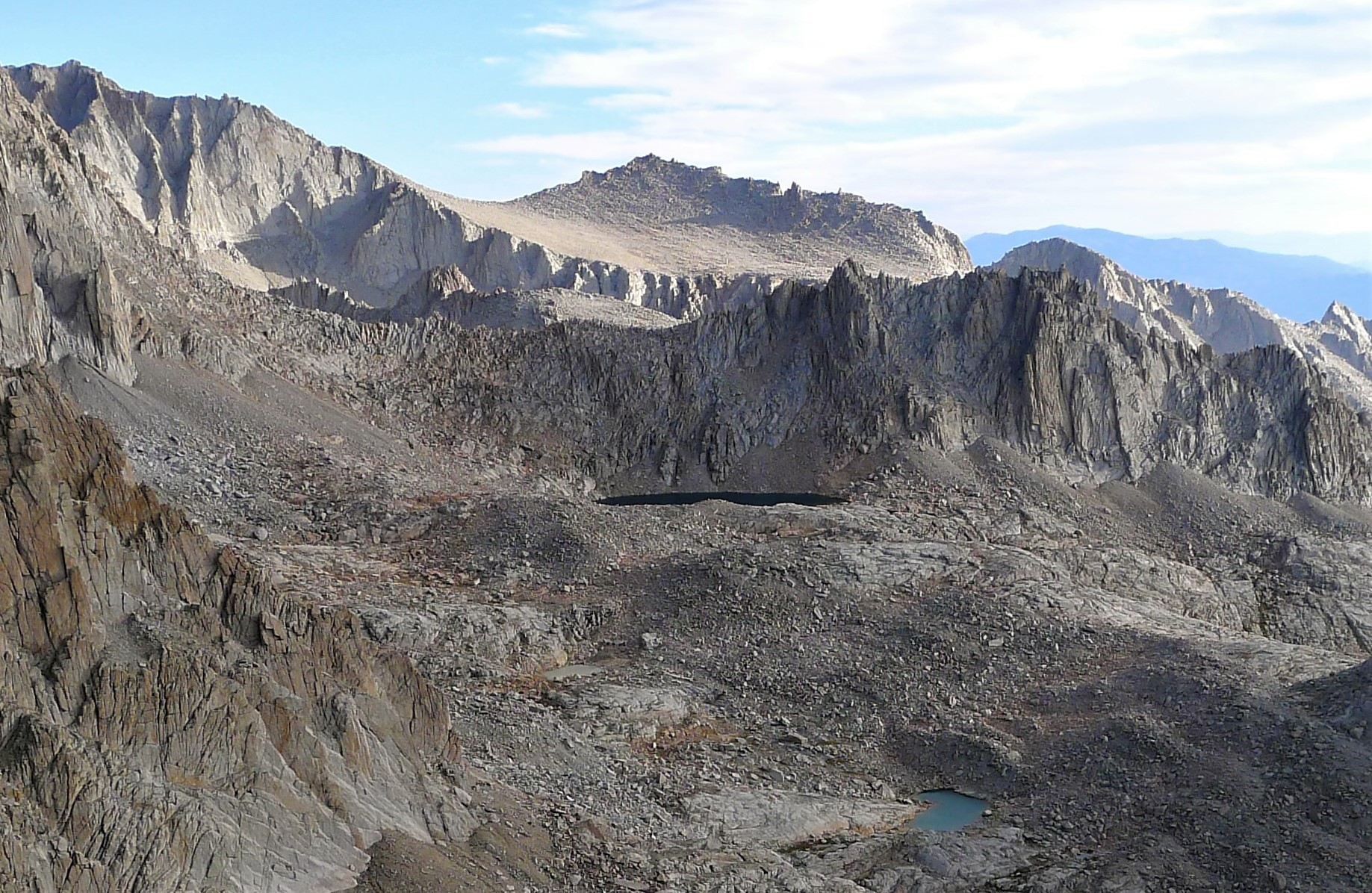
- Mt. Carillon centered at top, south aspect (Mt. Russell in upper left corner)

Highest point
- Elevation: 13,559 ft (4,133 m) NAVD 88
- Prominence: 233 ft (71 m)
- Parent peak: Mount Russell (14,088 ft)
- Isolation: 0.41 mi (0.66 km)
- Listing: Sierra Peaks Section
- Coordinates: 36°35′33″N 118°16′40″W

Naming
- Etymology: Carillon

Geography
- Location within California Location within the United States
- Location: Sequoia National Park; Tulare County / Inyo County; California, U.S.
- Parent range: Sierra Nevada
- Topo map: USGS Mount Whitney

Geology
- Rock age: Cretaceous
- Mountain type: Fault block
- Rock type: granitic

Climbing
- First ascent: 1925, Norman Clyde
- Easiest route: Simple scramble class 2+

Mount Carillon is a 13,559-foot-elevation (4,133-meter) mountain summit located on the crest of the Sierra Nevada mountain range in California. It is situated on the common border of Tulare County with Inyo County, as well as the shared boundary of Sequoia National Park and John Muir Wilderness. It is set above the south shore of Tulainyo Lake, 12.5 miles (20.1 km) west of the community of Lone Pine, 1.25 miles (2.01 km) northeast of Mount Whitney, and 0.7 miles (1.1 km) east-northeast of Mount Russell, the nearest higher neighbor. Topographic relief is significant as it rises approximately 5,180 feet (1,580 meters) above Whitney Portal in approximately two miles. Carillon has subpeaks, unofficially called "The Cleaver" (13,383 ft (4,079 m), 0.4 mile to the northeast, and "Impala" (12,073+ ft/3,680+ m), on the southeast ridge.

== History ==
The first ascent of the summit was made in 1925, by Norman Clyde, who is credited with 130 first ascents, most of which were in the Sierra Nevada. The peak's name was submitted by Chester Versteeg of the Sierra Club, and officially adopted by the United States Board on Geographic Names in 1937. It is so named because it is shaped like a bell tower, which often houses a carillon.

== Climate ==
According to the Köppen climate classification system, Mount Carillon has an alpine climate. Most weather fronts originate in the Pacific Ocean, and travel east toward the Sierra Nevada mountains. As fronts approach, they are forced upward by the peaks, causing them to drop their moisture in the form of rain or snowfall onto the range (orographic lift). Precipitation runoff from this mountain drains west to the Kern River via Wallace Creek, and east to Owens Valley via Lone Pine Creek.

== Climbing ==
Established climbing routes:

- West Ridge via Russell-Carillon saddle (class 2) 1925 by Norman Clyde
- Northeast Ridge (class 3)
- Southeast Ridge (class 4)
- East Face (class 5.8) 1968 by Fred Beckey, Chuck Haas
- Impala, South Face (class 5.7) 1968 by Chuck Ray, Brad Fowler
- Impala, Diagonal Route (class 5.7) 1968 by Fred Beckey, Charlie Raymond
- The Winged Horse (class 5.8) 1970 by Fred Beckey, Jack Miller
- Sweet Carillon (class 5.10+) 2008 by Andre Kiryanov, Shay Har-Noy

== Gallery ==
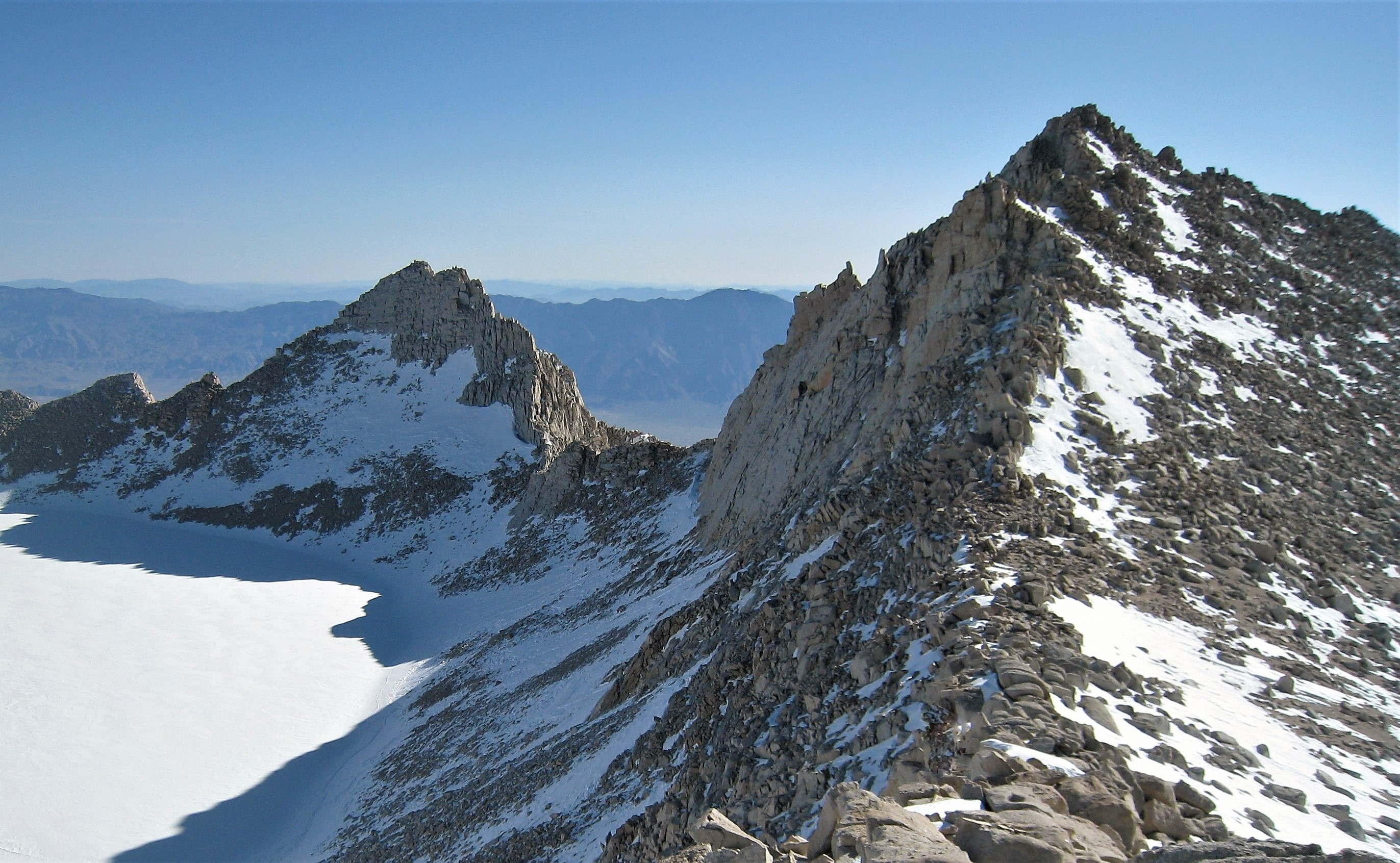
Carillon (right) and The Cleaver (left)

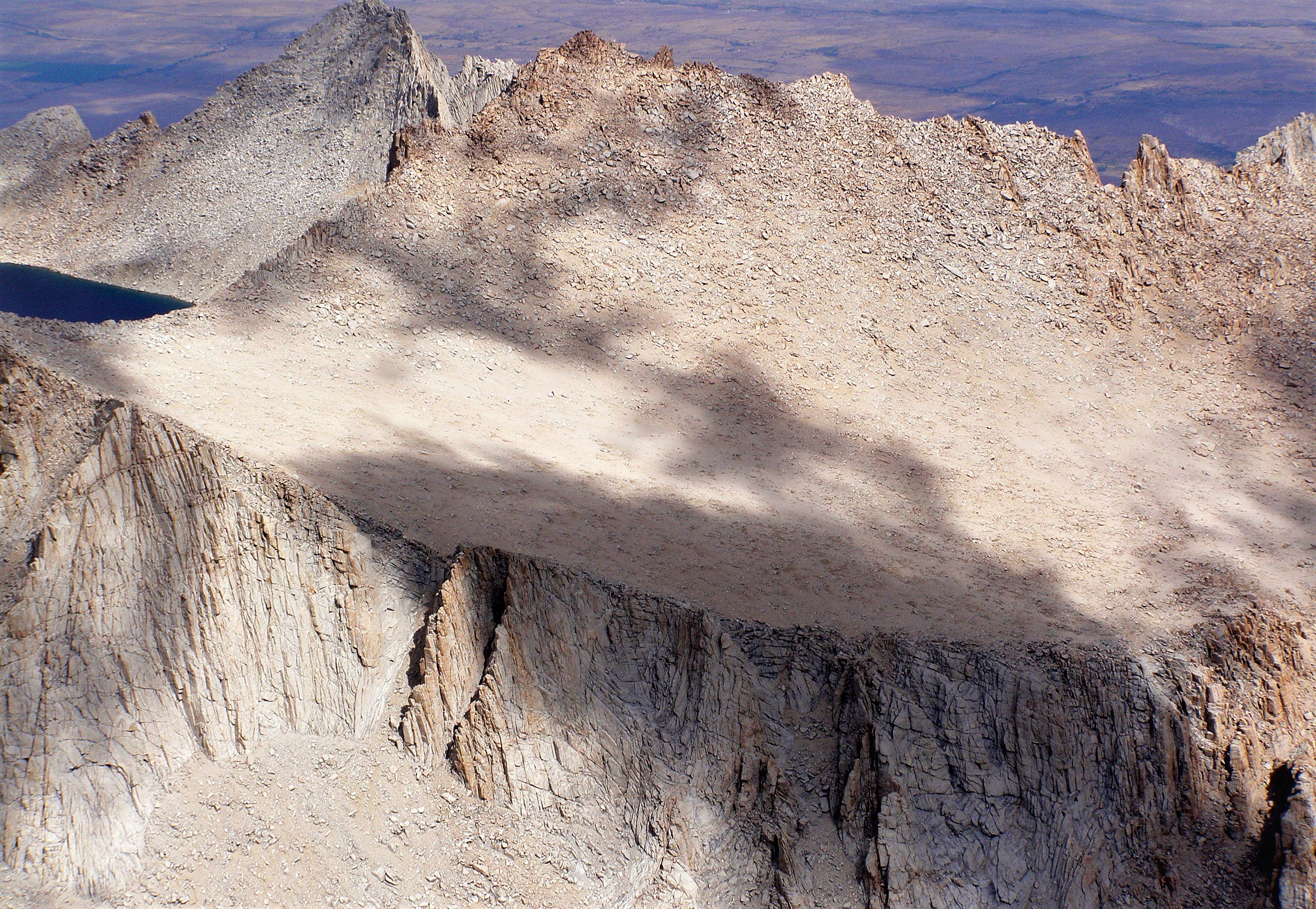
Mt. Carillon, with The Cleaver behind

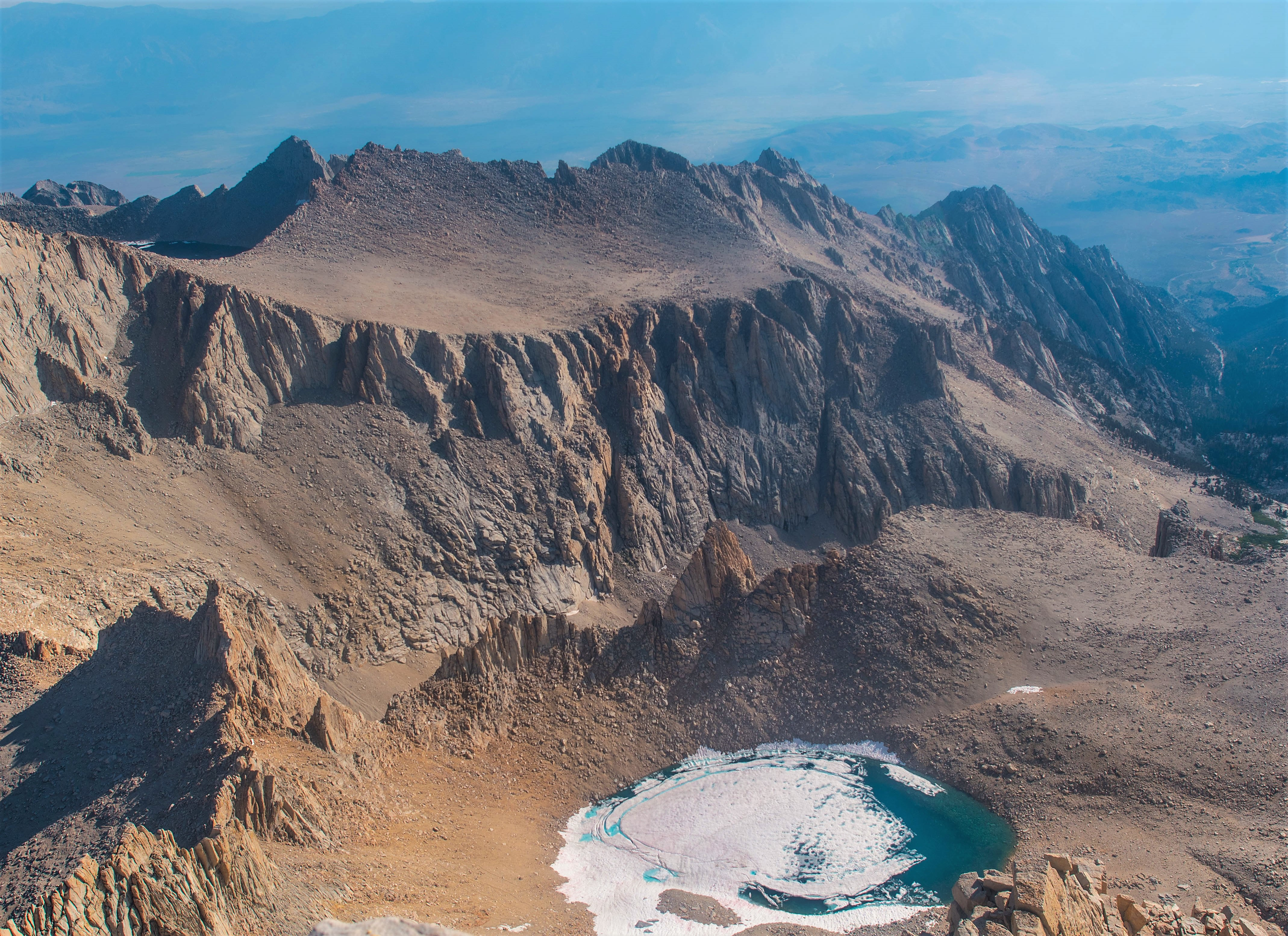
Southwest aspect of Carillon from the summit of Mt. Whitney. Iceberg Lake below.

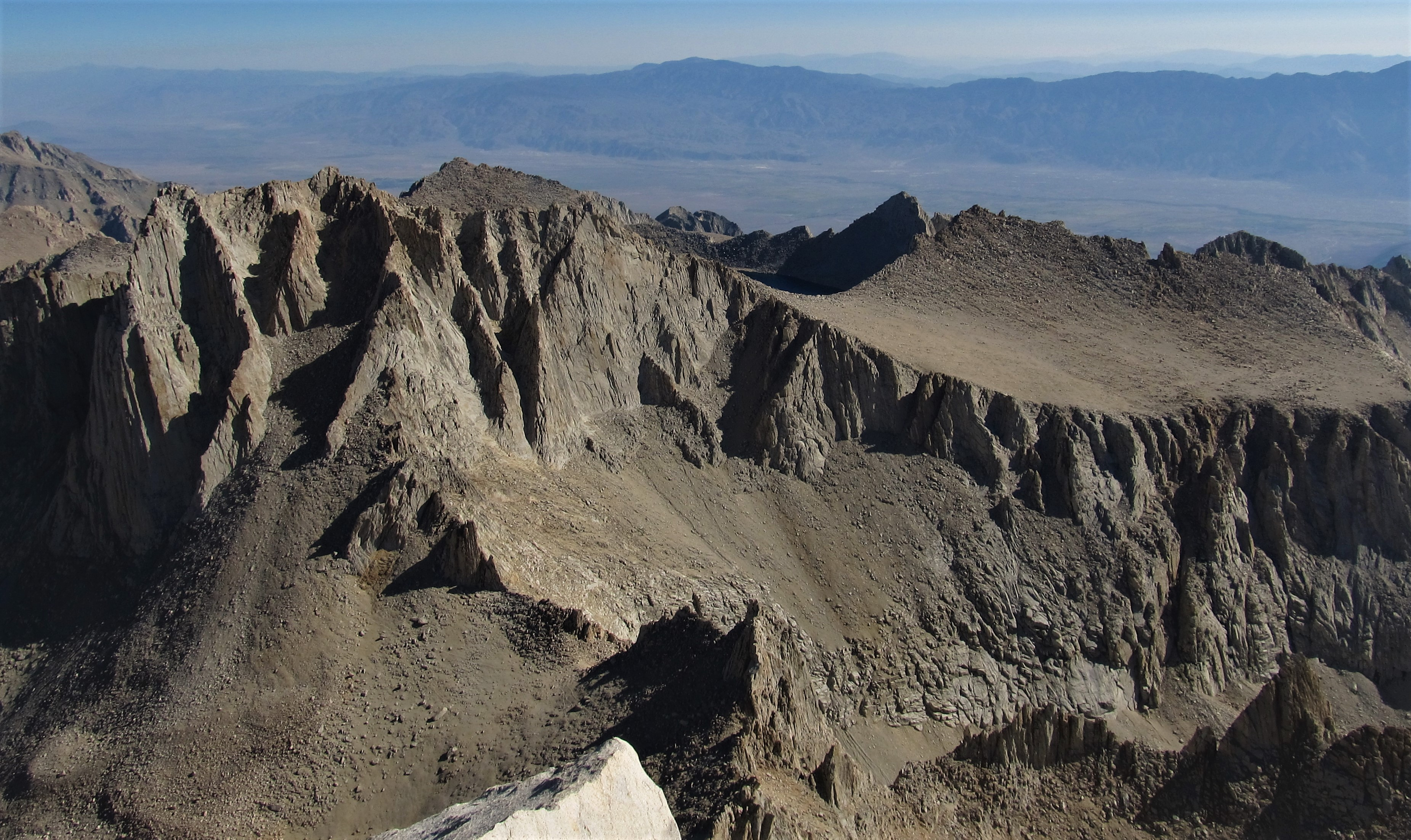
Mount Russell (left) and Mt. Carillon (right) from the summit of Mount Whitney.

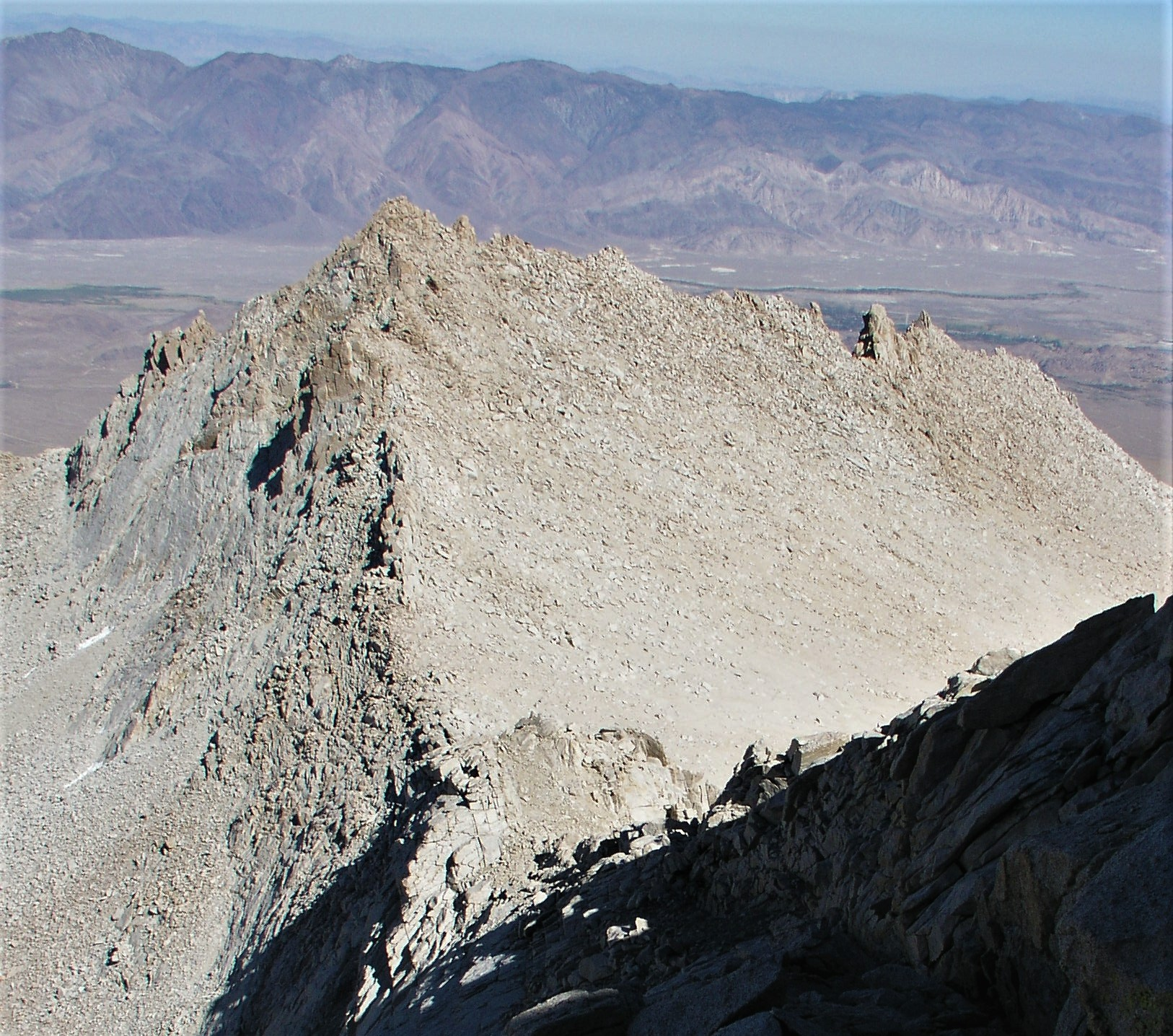
West aspect of Mt. Carillon seen from Mt. Russell

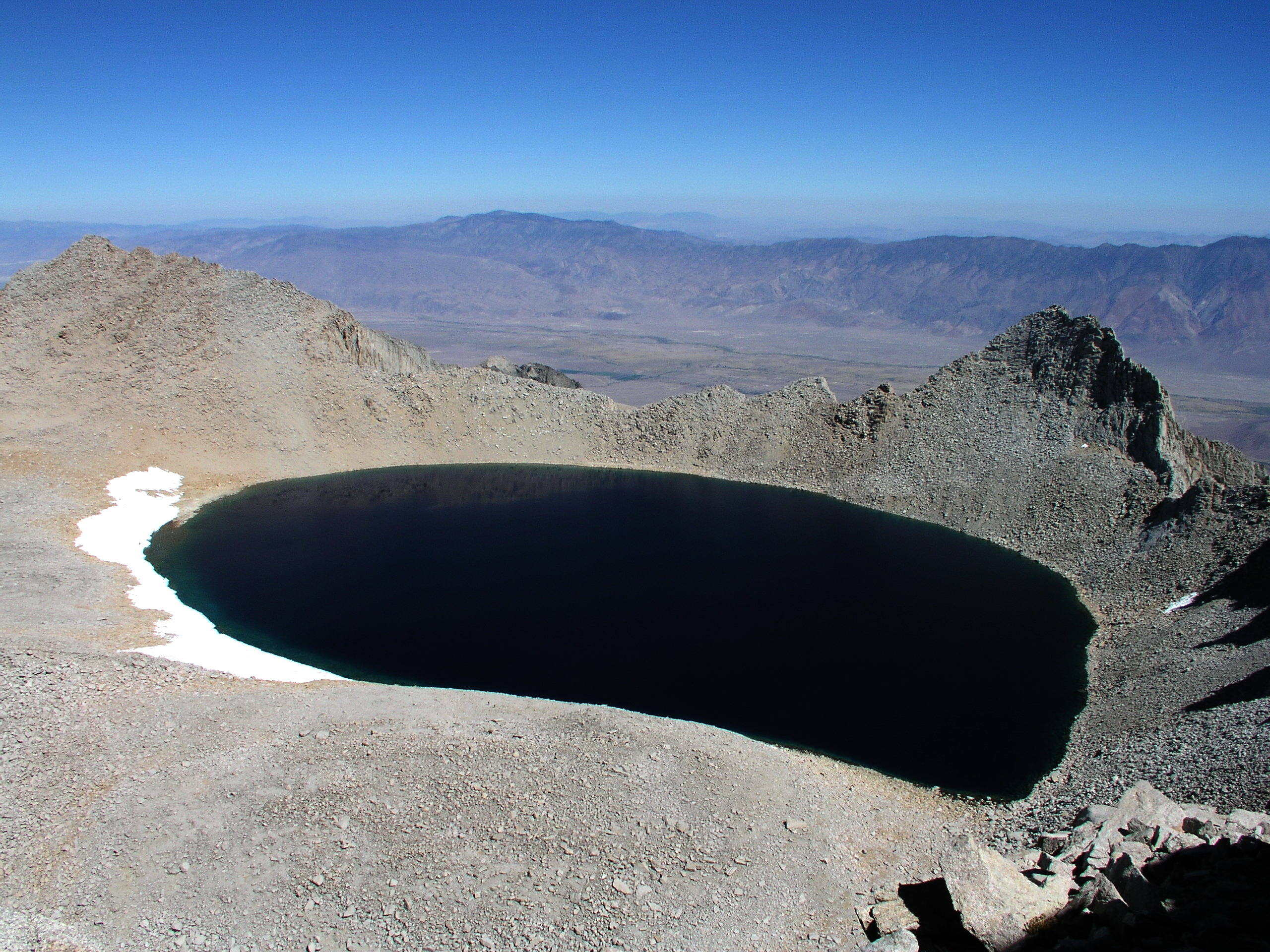
Tulainyo Lake and Mt. Carillon's subpeak "The Cleaver" to the right.
(Tunnabora Peak to left).

== See also ==
- List of mountain peaks of California
