= Hawthorne Municipal Airport =

Hawthorne Municipal Airport may refer to:

- Hawthorne Municipal Airport (California) or Jack Northrop Field in Hawthorne, California, United States (FAA: HHR)
- Hawthorne Industrial Airport, formerly Hawthorne Municipal Airport in Hawthorne, Nevada, United States (FAA: HTH)

== See also ==
- Hawthorne Airport (disambiguation)
