= Tunnabora Peak =

Mountain in California

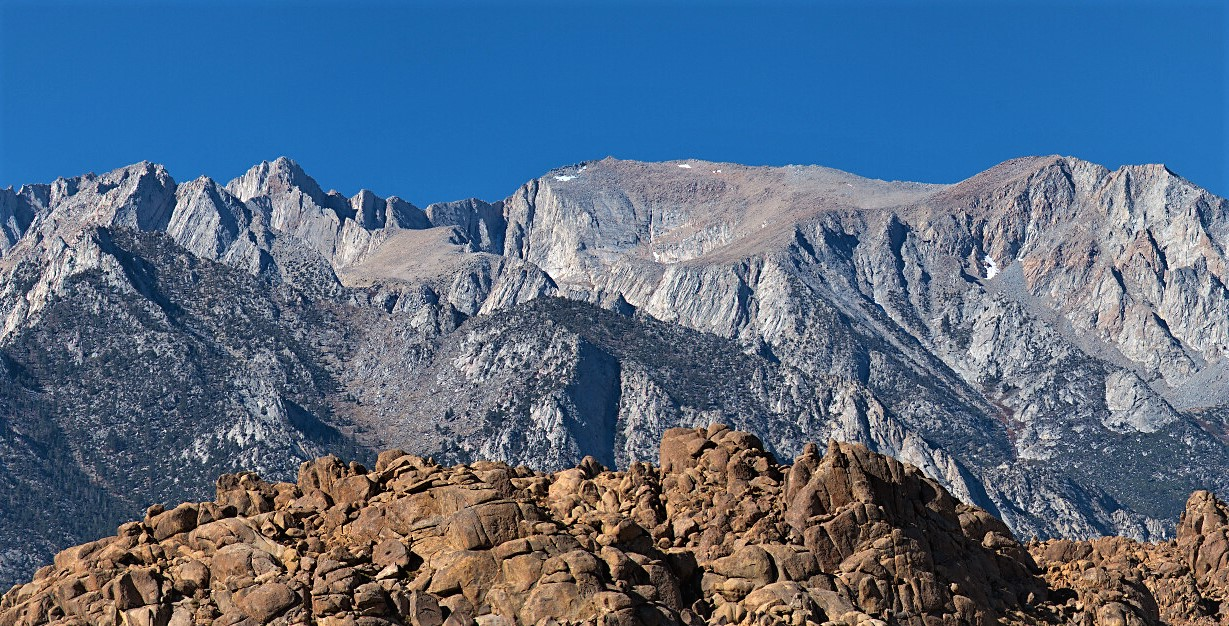
- Tunnabora Peak centered at top, east aspect

Highest point
- Elevation: 13,563 ft (4,134 m)
- Prominence: 571 ft (174 m)
- Parent peak: Mount Russell (14,088 ft)
- Isolation: 1.15 mi (1.85 km)
- Listing: Sierra Peaks Section
- Coordinates: 36°36′18″N 118°16′56″W

Geography
- Location within California Location within the United States
- Location: Sequoia National Park; Tulare County / Inyo County; California, U.S.
- Parent range: Sierra Nevada
- Topo map: USGS Mount Whitney

Geology
- Rock age: Cretaceous
- Mountain type: Fault block
- Rock type: granitic

Climbing
- First ascent: 1905
- Easiest route: class 2 South slope

Tunnabora Peak is a 13,563-foot-elevation (4,134-meter) mountain summit located on the crest of the Sierra Nevada mountain range in California. It is situated on the common border of Tulare County with Inyo County, as well as the shared boundary of Sequoia National Park and John Muir Wilderness. It is set above the north shore of Tulainyo Lake, 13 miles (21 km) west of the community of Lone Pine, 1.86 miles (2.99 km) north-northeast of Mount Whitney, and 0.9 miles (1.4 km) north-northwest of Mount Carillon. Tunnabora ranks as the 51st-highest peak in California. Topographic relief is significant as it rises approximately 5,200 feet (1,600 meters) above Whitney Portal in approximately three miles.

== History ==
The first ascent of the summit was made in August 1905 by George R. Davis, USGS topographic engineer. The peak's name was submitted by the National Park Service, and officially adopted by the United States Board on Geographic Names in 1928. The etymology is uncertain, possibly Shoshonean, Mono dialect.

== Climate ==
Tunnabora Peak has an alpine climate. Most weather fronts originate in the Pacific Ocean, and travel east toward the Sierra Nevada mountains. As fronts approach, they are forced upward by the peaks, causing them to drop their moisture in the form of rain or snowfall onto the range (orographic lift). Precipitation runoff from this mountain drains west to the Kern River via Wallace Creek, and east to Owens Valley via George and Hogback Creeks.

== Gallery ==
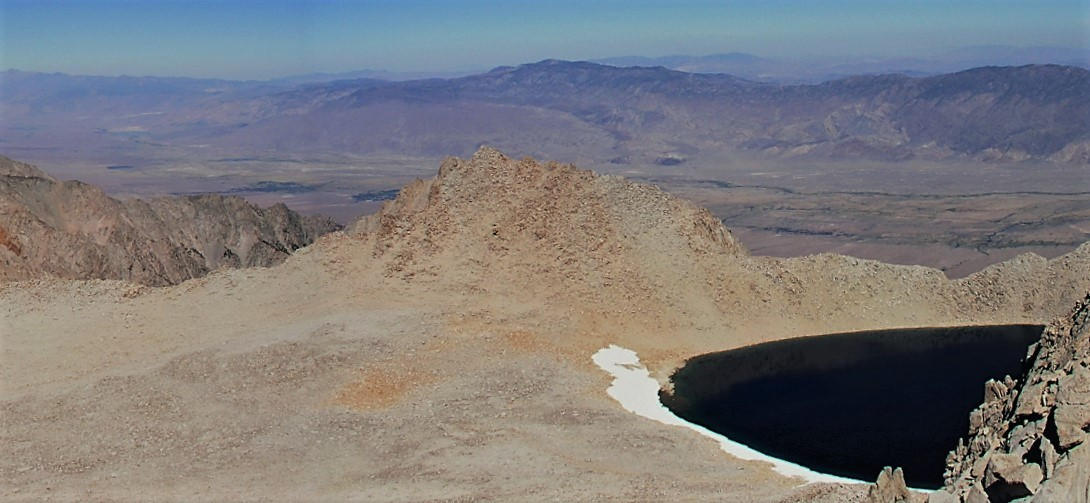
Tunnabora Peak from Mt. Russell

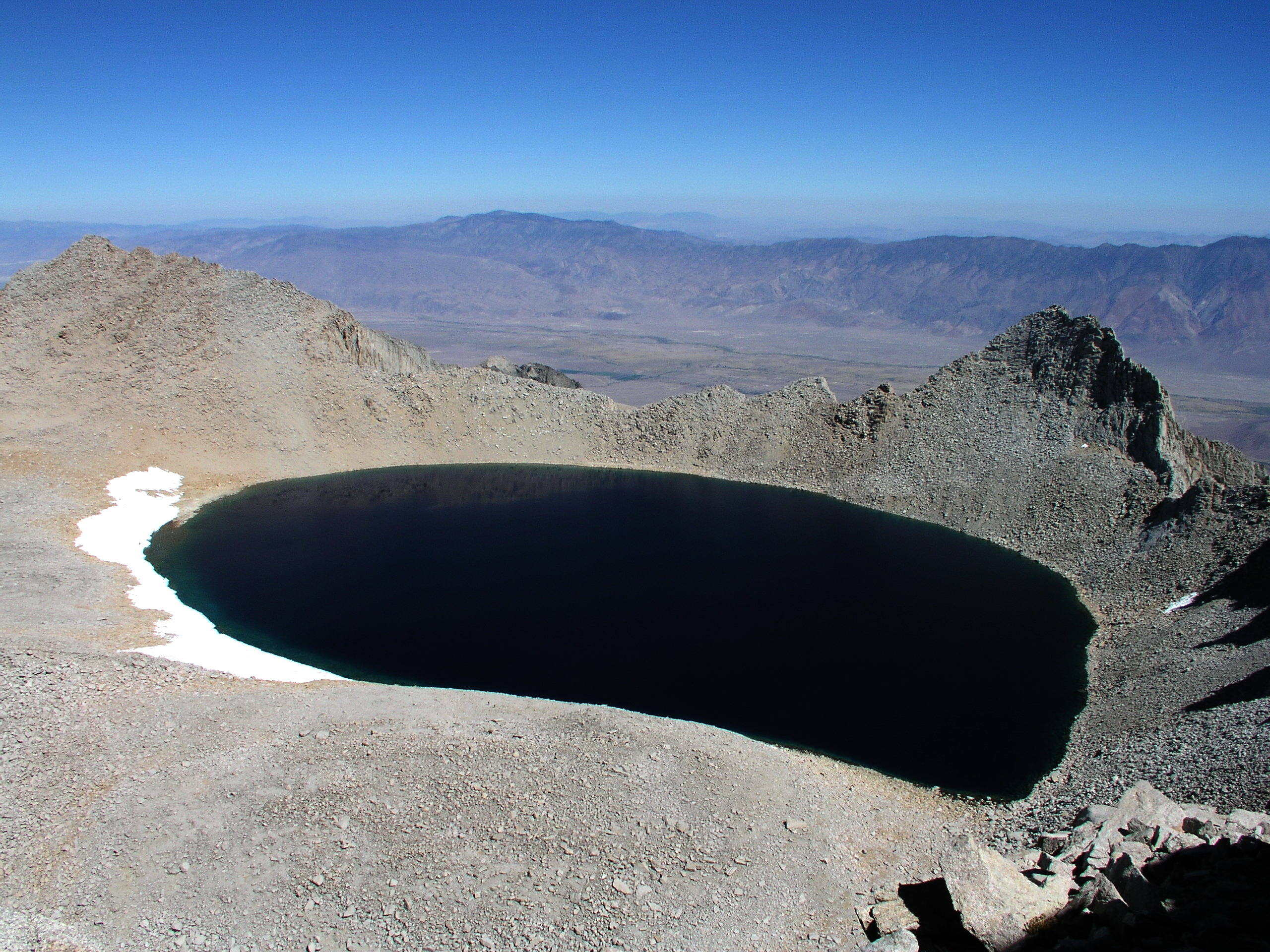
Tunnabora summit to the left.
Tulainyo Lake, with Mt. Carillon's subpeak "The Cleaver" to the right.

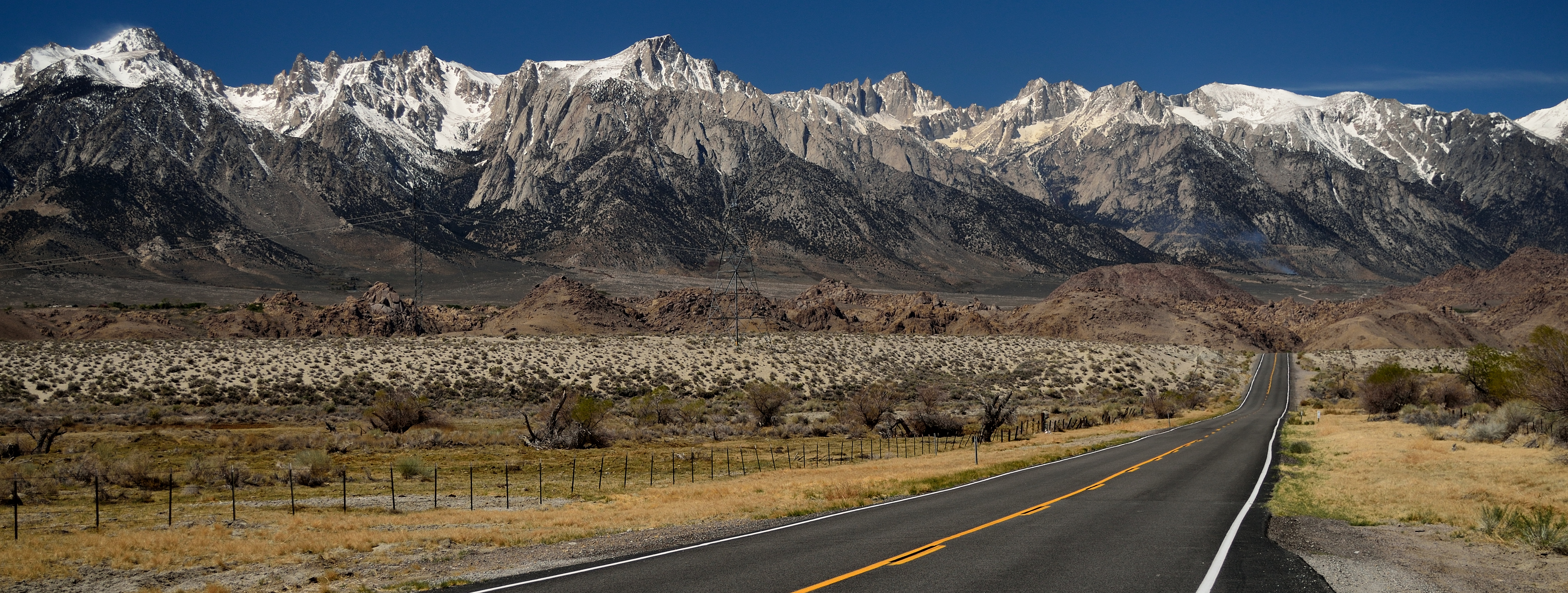
Eastern Sierra, with road pointed toward Tunnabora Peak

Eastern Sierra, with Tunnabora Peak centered

== See also ==
- List of the major 4000-meter summits of California
- Mount Carl Heller
