= Tulainyo Lake =

Lake in California, United States

- Lake Tulainyo
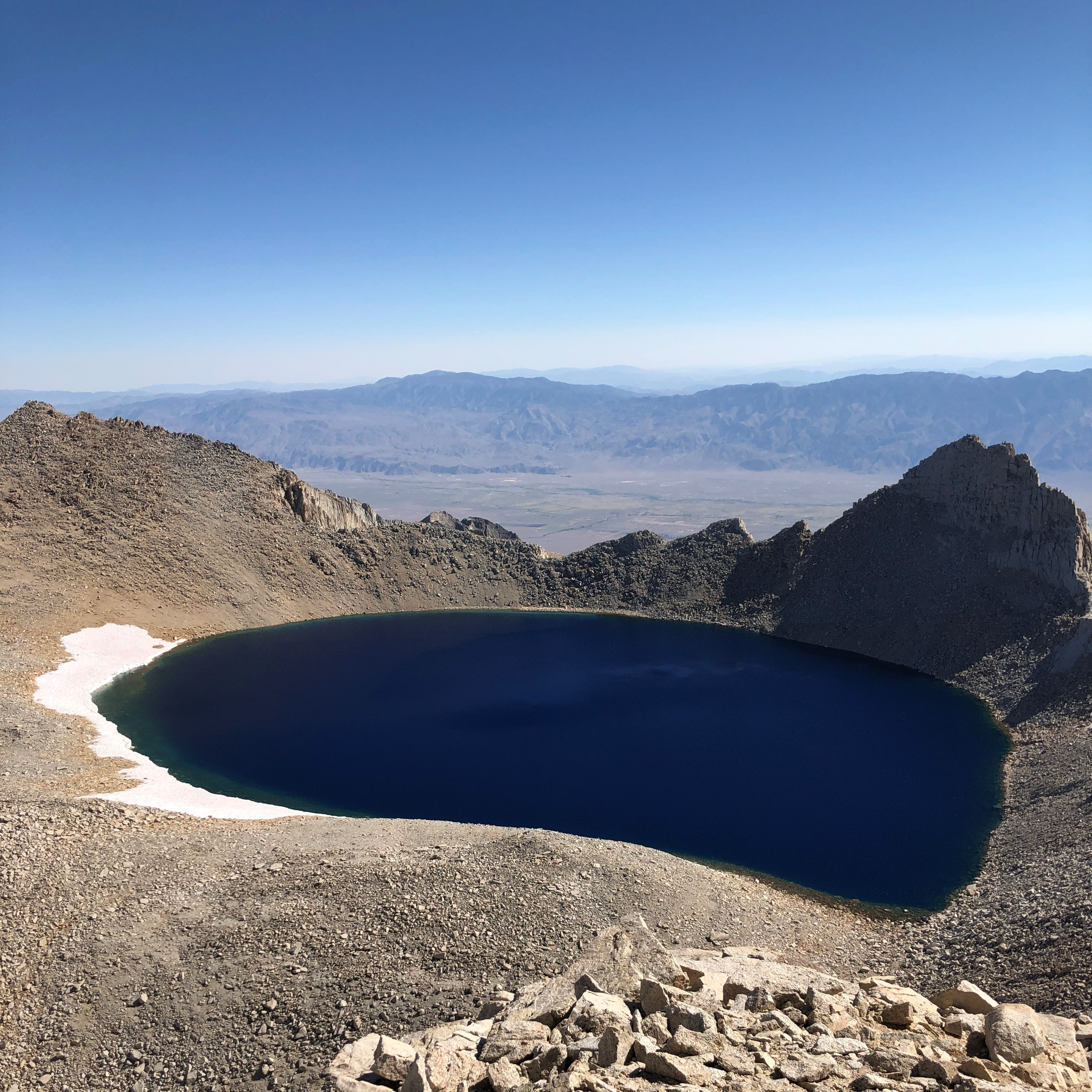
- Tulainyo Lake viewed from Mount Russell while Tunnabora Peak (left) and The Cleaver (right) frame Owens Valley and the Inyo Mountains

- Tulainyo Lake's location in the Eastern Sierra
- Location: Sierra Nevada, California
- Coordinates: 36°35′51″N 118°16′48″W
- Type: Alpine lake
- Etymology: Portmanteau of the names Tulare and Inyo
- Primary inflows: Snowmelt
- Primary outflows: None
- Basin countries: United States
- Max. length: 0.5 mi (0.80 km)
- Max. width: 0.35 mi (0.56 km)
- Surface area: 84.73 acres (34.29 ha)
- Max. depth: 385 ft (117 m)
- Water volume: 14,000 acre-feet (17,000,000 m^3)
- Shore length^{1}: 1.37 mi (2.20 km)
- Surface elevation: 12,829 ft (3,910 m)
- Frozen: Regularly in winter
- Islands: None
- ^{1} Shore length is not a well-defined measure.

Tulainyo Lake is a freshwater alpine lake in the eastern Sierra Nevada in the U.S. state of California, and one of the highest and largest of the alpine lakes of the Sierra. It lies in a large granite bowl bounded by the Sierra Crest to the north, east, and south, at an altitude of 12,829 ft (3,910 m). It lies within Sequoia National Park and the Sequoia-Kings Canyon Wilderness, in close proximity to Mount Whitney, the highest peak in the contiguous United States.

Tulainyo Lake's depth was not measured until 2026, when the lake was determined to be 385 ft (117 m) deep. The lake's altitude and location at the very crest of the range mean that it is frozen over during the winter, such that it has even been ice skated, and ice and snow often linger around the lake's shoreline well into the summer.

For many years after its initial mapping, Tulainyo Lake was considered the highest lake in the United States, or even North America. Depending on the definition used, however, multiple "lakes" have been found at higher elevations. Several unnamed tarns in the Sierra Nevada are higher, as are a handful of named bodies of water, including Pacific Tarn in Colorado's Rocky Mountains and Lake Waiau on Mauna Kea in Hawaii. The twin volcanic crater lakes of Nevado de Toluca in Mexico sit at approximately 13,800 feet (4,200 m). However, Tulainyo Lake surpasses all of them in size, and may still be the highest named lake in California and the Sierra Nevada.

In large part because of its high elevation, the lake played a notable role in the history of California's Eastern Sierra, and the California water wars, between Owens Valley residents and the city of Los Angeles. In 1937 the lake starred in a so-called Wedding of the Waters celebration honoring the opening of California State Route 190 from Owens Valley to Death Valley.

== Geography ==
Tulainyo Lake is described as lying in a cirque that, according to a 20th-century geological survey, "doubtless held a small glacier until very recently." The lake is enclosed by a moraine, through which some water seeps out. The lake is also rimmed with talus and surrounded by multiple high peaks: 13,563-foot (4,134 m) Tunnabora Peak to the north; 13,553-foot (4,131 m) Mount Carillon to the south; a 13,383-foot (4,079 m) subpeak of Carillon, named The Cleaver, to the east; and 14,094-foot (4,296 m) fourteener Mount Russell (the seventh-highest peak in the state) to the southwest.

West of the lake, the terrain slopes down to the headwaters of Wallace Creek, which drains out of the Wallace Lakes basin before joining Wright Creek and eventually the upper Kern River. Tulainyo Lake is not accessible by road or trail, and is most easily reached from the Wallace Lakes basin off of the John Muir Trail and Pacific Crest Trail five miles (eight kilometres) to the west, or from the steep North Fork Lone Pine Creek drainage to the south, via the pass between Mount Russell and Mount Carillon. A use trail extends from the John Muir Trail to Wallace Lake.

== History ==
=== Mapping and naming ===
The lake is partially visible from the summit of Mount Whitney, where the first recorded ascent took place in 1873. The lake's surrounding summits, with views dominated by Tulainyo, were climbed in the early 20th century (Tunnabora Peak was first climbed in 1905, Carillon in 1925, and Mount Russell in 1926). According to the U.S. Board on Geographic Names, the name Tulainyo Lake was first given in 1917 by USGS chief geographer R.B. Marshall—it is a portmanteau, based on the lake's location in Tulare County immediately west of the Inyo County line. The Board approved the name in 1928. However, the name appears on maps as early as 1907, and a 1935 Oakland Tribune article states that it was believed the lake was named by government topographer G. R. Davis in 1905.

=== 20th century ===
On October 16, 1935, Chester Versteeg, chairman of the geographic committee of the Sierra Club, publicly announced that after two years of research, Tulainyo Lake had been ascertained the "highest lake on the American continent." The lake's status was verified at the time by the United States Geological Survey. Water from Tulainyo Lake was tested and found to be very soft (low in mineral content). At the time, Versteeg mused about building a trail connecting Tulainyo Lake to the John Muir Trail, but ultimately no such trail was constructed. Versteeg's announcement received coverage in newspapers throughout the American West, including the Los Angeles Times, the Oakland Tribune, the Deseret News, and the Reno Gazette-Journal. The Tribune even speculated that, as the lake was higher than Bolivia and Peru's Lake Titicaca (generally recognized as the world's highest lake at that time), Tulainyo Lake might even be the highest lake in the world.

==== Wedding of the Waters ====
In 1937, Tulainyo Lake played a major role in the opening and dedication of California State Route 190 from the town of Olancha to Death Valley, which officially linked the highest point—Mount Whitney, via Whitney Portal—and lowest point in the contiguous United States. The elaborate ceremony—devised and organized by local boosters such as Fr. John J. Crowley—was called the Wedding of the Waters. It involved taking water from the country's highest lake (as Tulainyo was then thought to be) to its lowest (the endorheic Badwater Basin sometimes contains an ephemeral saltwater lake) via a wide variety of transportation methods.

To commence the ceremony, on October 29, 1937, a young Washoe Native American youth from Nevada named Jerry Emm cracked the ice on Tulainyo Lake and filled a gourd with water. He ran 17 miles (27 km) with the gourd, down to Whitney Portal at 8,374 ft (2,552 m), where a series of horseback riders recalling the mythologized Pony Express brought it to the town of Lone Pine in Owens Valley, at the foot of the Sierra Nevada. That night, the water remained in a bank vault while some was served to Governor of California Frank Merriam at a celebratory dinner. The next day, the gourd of water was conveyed by a donkey-borne miner down Main Street, handed off to a covered wagon, passed off again to a twenty-mule team, and then to a stagecoach. Next, a narrow-gauge railway train took the gourd to Keeler. October 31 marked the gourd's final travel segments, from Keeler to the new highway's cutoff to Darwin in a 1938 Lincoln-Zephyr car, where the highway was officially opened. The ceremony featured descendants of the Donner Party and Death Valley '49ers, as well as Governor Merriam, and President Franklin D. Roosevelt via telex.

The gourd was put on board a plane in Panamint Valley, and finally the water from Tulainyo Lake was dropped by T.R. Goodwin, first superintendent of Death Valley National Monument, into the ephemeral lake of Badwater Basin: the lowest point in North America. Signal fires were lit across the mountains from Dante's View to the summit of Mount Whitney, where a firefall lit by Norman Clyde culminated the ceremony. The long list of conveyances for the gourd was intended to recreate their use in California's history, from earliest and most 'primitive' to most recent.

==== Stocking of trout ====
In the late 1930s, the lake was stocked with golden trout by the California State Fish and Game Commission. The mountainous terrain was deemed too risky for aerial fish stocking, where fish are released from low-flying aircraft. So, in 1938, 10,000 juvenile trout from the Mount Whitney Fish Hatchery had to be transported by mule, 40 miles (64 km) and 9,000 feet (2,700 m) in elevation from the hatchery, over Shepherd Pass into the Kern River basin, where they were taken cross-country through the Wallace Lakes basin to Tulainyo Lake. Kept in specially designed aerated cans slung over the backs of the mules, the trout were released into walled-in sections of streams as workers camped for the night. A mere 20 trout died on the journey, but there were concerns about whether any of the remaining trout would survive the bitter winter at nearly 13,000 feet (4,000 m). They reportedly thrived for several years, but their fate beyond that is unknown. Other fish stocking efforts in Tulainyo Lake are referenced in 1933, and in 1936, but in less detail.

==== Guyford Stever muon research ====
In 1939, American physicist Guyford Stever used Tulainyo Lake as a location for his research on cosmic rays while in graduate school at the California Institute of Technology (CalTech). Stever and two fellow graduate students were using recording electroscopes with a quartz fiber, and a battery-powered clock to recharge the fiber, to measure the intensity of mesons at two different altitudes. To eliminate absorption effects, and to ensure that any detected difference in the quantity of mesons was due to their decay while in transit (mesons are extremely short-lived), Stever and his fellows immersed the electroscopes deep in water. Their higher-elevation experiment site was Tulainyo Lake, where the men carried equipment by mule and paddled out in a faltboot in early September and attached the electroscope to a buoy, where it remained for several days. The experiment was successful, although the faltboot was damaged and some equipment lost during a storm when the boat overturned. Afterwards, the experiment attracted the attention of American physicist J. Robert Oppenheimer.

==== Aviation events ====
In winter of 1950, Johnny Hodgkin, a rancher and pilot from Selma, California, landed a light plane on skis adjacent to Tulainyo Lake, potentially setting a then-record for highest-altitude aircraft landing and takeoff. As Tulainyo Lake and its environs were within the boundaries of Sequoia National Park, he was reprimanded by park authorities and forbidden from repeating the stunt.

The lake's vicinity was also the site of an aviation accident in the 1960s. On February 8, 1969, Hawthorne Nevada Airlines 'Gambler's Special' Flight 708 (a Douglas DC-3 airliner flying from Hawthorne, Nevada to Burbank, California) crashed into the sheer cliffs forming Tulainyo Lake's eastern ramparts, high above the Hogback Creek drainage. All 35 passengers were killed. The crash occurred in poor weather and at night during a new moon; investigators concluded the proximate cause was deviation from the assigned flight path, as the crew likely thought they were further south, near Palmdale. Due to the inclement weather, including heavy snowfall, the wreckage site was not discovered until six months later on August 8. On August 10, an Air Force HH-43B Huskie helicopter carrying investigators to the accident site itself crashed just 100 yards (meters) away, causing one serious injury.

==== Other events ====
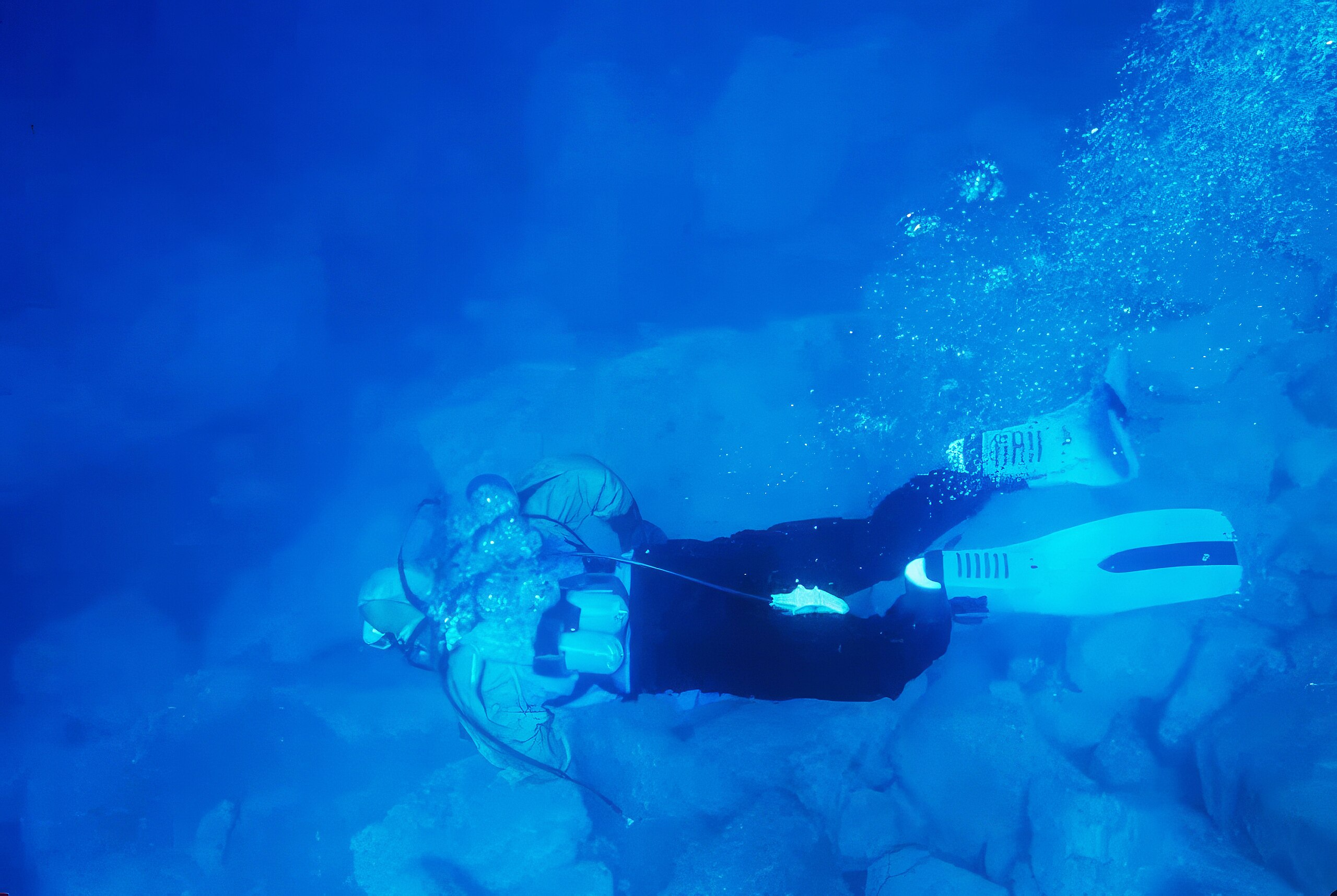
David Moore performing the high-elevation scuba dive in Tulainyo Lake in 1997

Tulainyo Lake was reportedly the favorite lake of Norman Clyde, a prolific and notable mountaineer and guide in the early 20th-century Sierra Nevada. The lake was also briefly the record-holder for the site of the highest-elevation scuba dive in North America, performed by Peter Hemming and David Moore in 1997. The pair dove to a depth of approximately 30 feet (9 m) for 15 minutes.

== Climate and ecology ==
According to the Köppen climate classification system, Tulainyo Lake is located in an alpine climate zone. Most weather fronts in the region originate in the Pacific Ocean and travel east toward the Sierra Nevada; as the fronts approach the peaks, they are forced upwards (in a classic case of orographic lift), inducing them to drop their moisture as rain or snowfall. Precipitation runoff has no major outlet from Tulainyo Lake, and leaves primarily through evaporation or seepage.

Tulainyo Lake is well above tree line and subject to cold and snowy conditions for much of the year, having an alpine ecology. No trees and very few plants grow in the vicinity of Tulainyo: one example is Polemonium eximium, or sky pilot, a cushion plant that grows low to the ground. Most animals are transient, such as the butterfly Parnassius phoebus and the gray-crowned rosy finch; the few exceptions include yellow-bellied marmots and the American pika, which live in burrows constructed among rocks. Early 20th-century sources indicate the lake itself was stocked with golden trout in the 1930s, and Hemming and Moore reported sighting a small fish during their record-breaking scuba dive in 1998.

== Gallery of surrounding topography ==
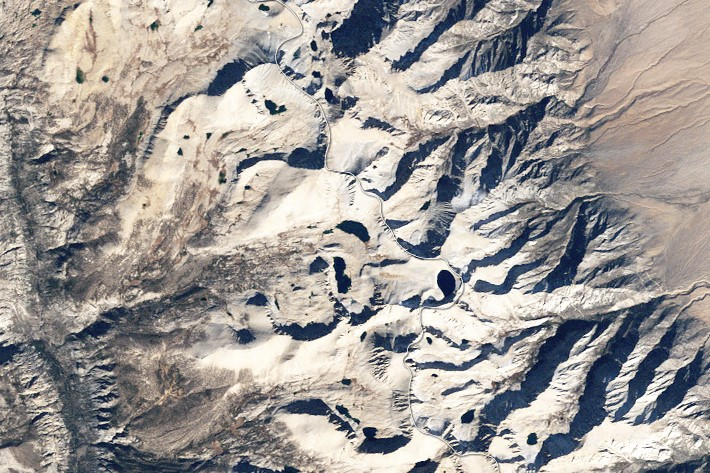
Tulainyo Lake's location along the crest of the Sierra Nevada (faint line marked in gray)

| 1 / Tulainyo Lake; 2 / Mount Russell | 3 / Mount Whitney; 4 / Whitney Portal | 5 / Owens Valley; 6 / Wallace Lake | 7 / Kern River |

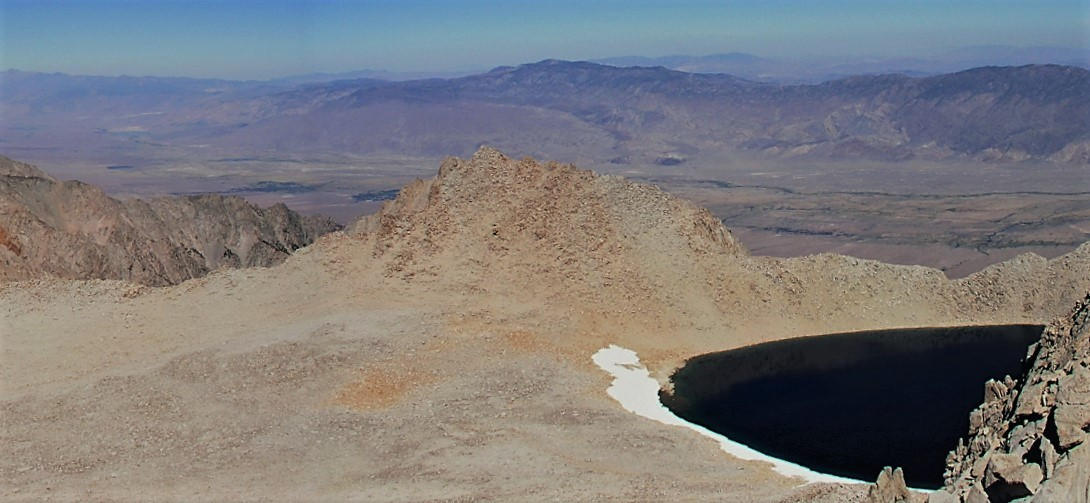
Tunnabora Peak, viewed from Mount Russell above Tulainyo Lake

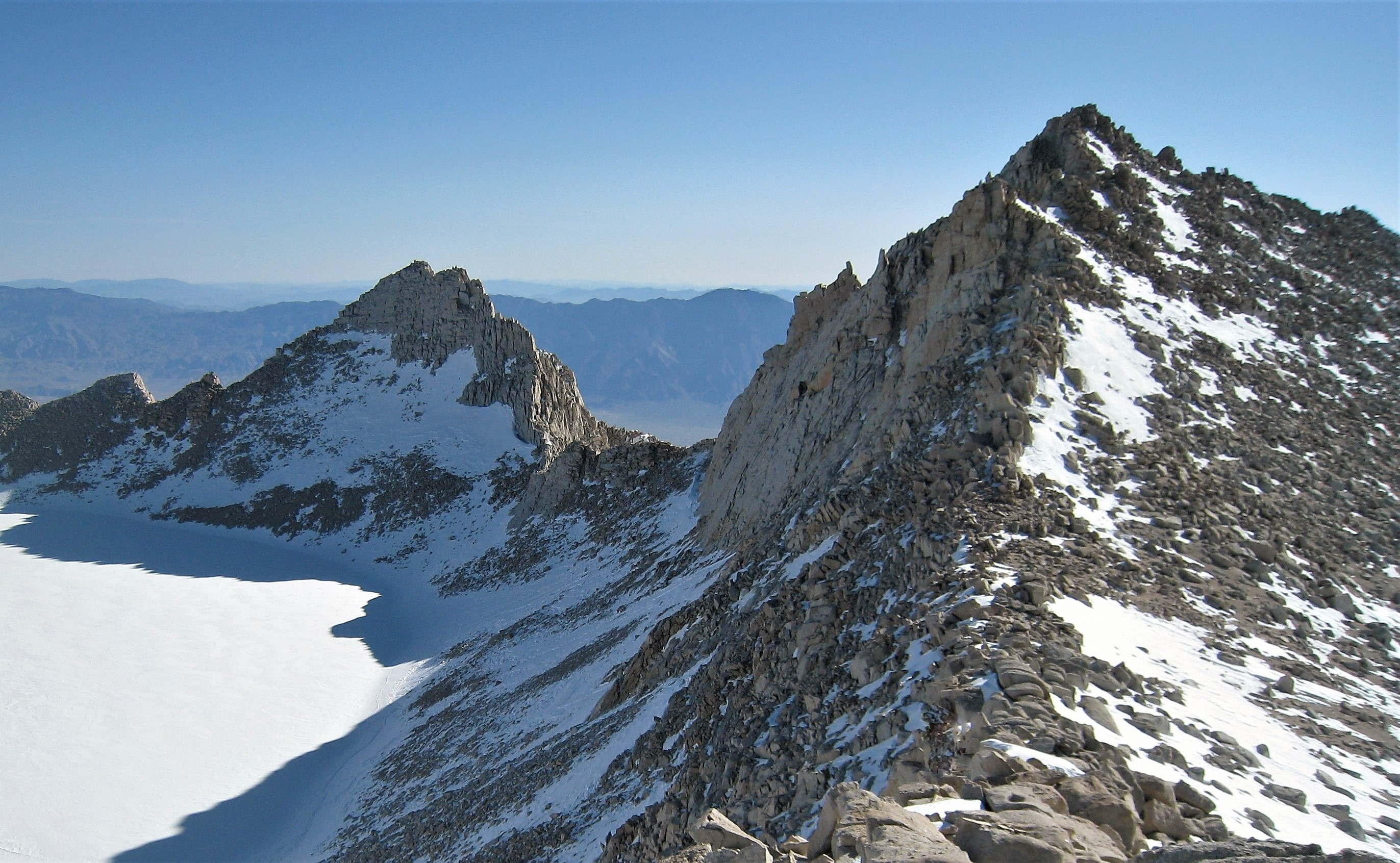
Mount Carillon (right) and its subpeak The Cleaver (left)

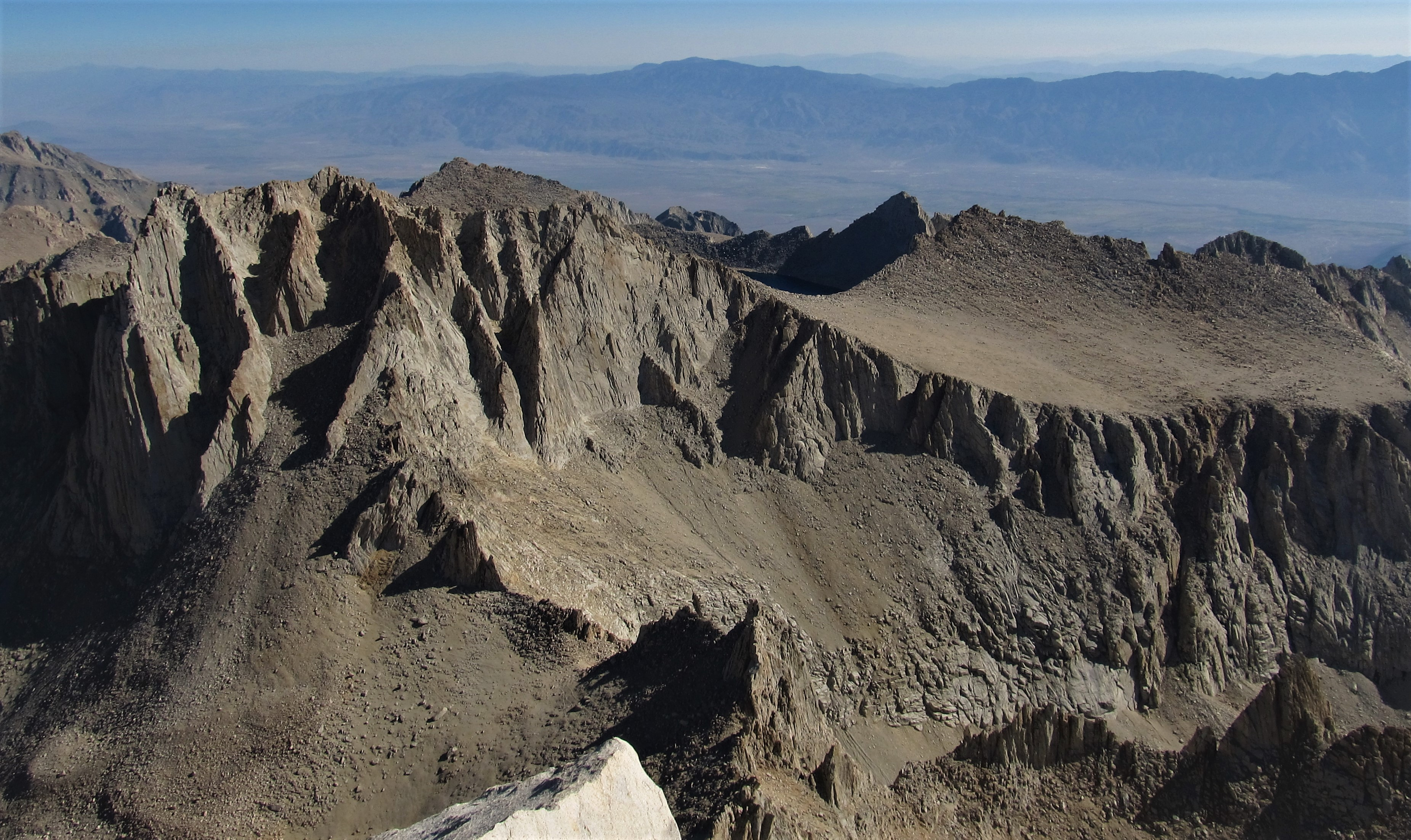
Mount Russell, viewed from Mount Whitney

== See also ==
- Altitude diving
