= Mount Carl Heller =

Mountain summit in California

- Vacation Peak
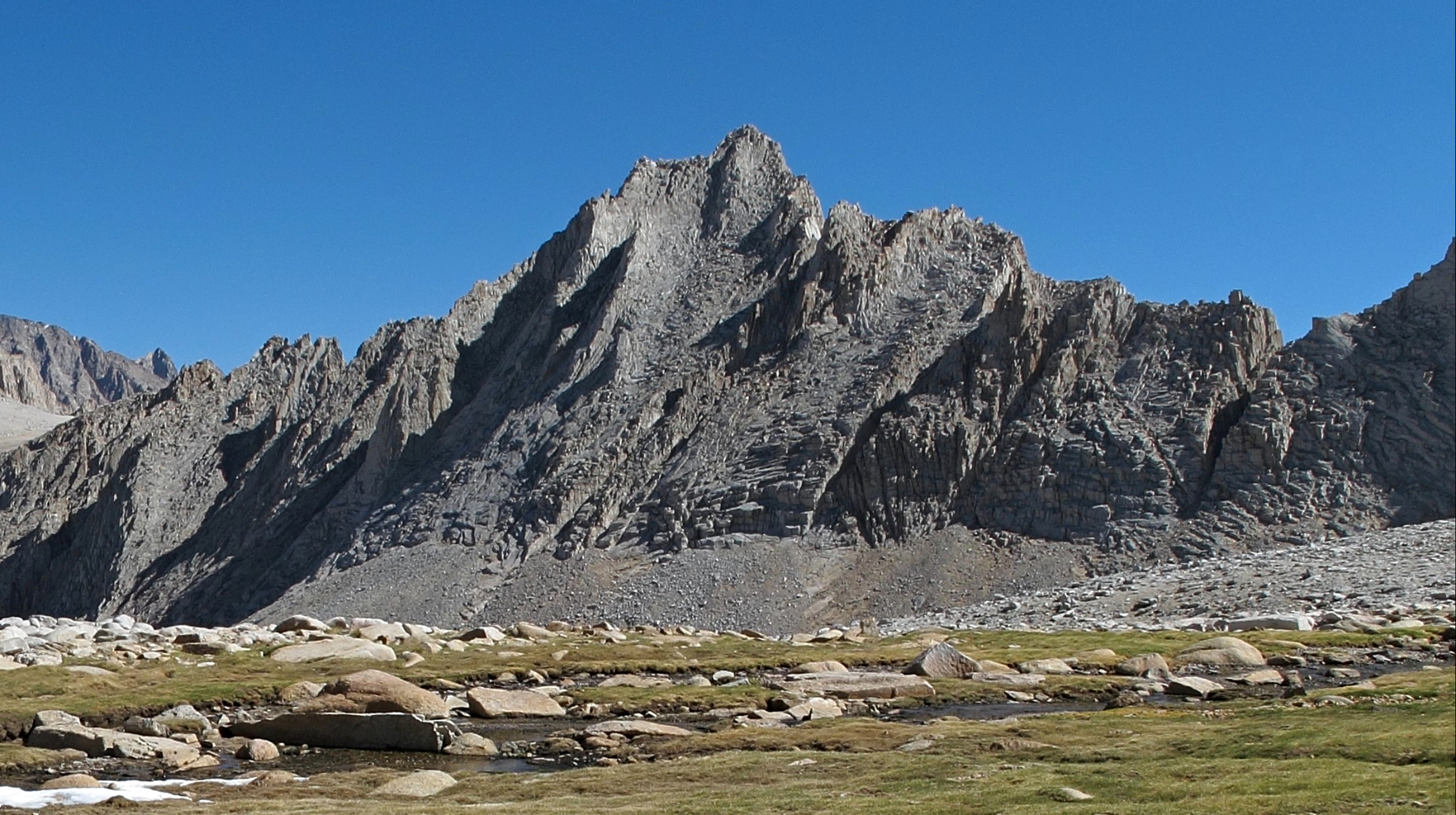
- West aspect

Highest point
- Elevation: 13,211 ft (4,027 m)
- Prominence: 495 ft (151 m)
- Parent peak: Tunnabora Peak (13,563 ft)
- Isolation: 1.00 mi (1.61 km)
- Coordinates: 36°36′42″N 118°17′55″W

Naming
- Etymology: Dr. Carl Heller

Geography
- Location within California Location within the United States
- Location: Sequoia National Park; Tulare County / Inyo County; California, U.S.
- Parent range: Sierra Nevada
- Topo map: USGS Mount Whitney

Geology
- Rock age: Cretaceous
- Mountain type: Fault block
- Rock type: granitic

Climbing
- First ascent: 1966
- Easiest route: class 3 scrambling

Mount Carl Heller is a 13,211-foot-elevation (4,027-meter) mountain summit located on the crest of the Sierra Nevada mountain range in California. It is situated on the common border shared by Tulare County with Inyo County, as well as the shared boundary of Sequoia National Park and John Muir Wilderness. It is set 13.5 miles (21.7 km) west of the community of Lone Pine, 1.9 miles (3.1 km) north of Mount Whitney, and 0.6 miles (0.97 km) northwest of Tunnabora Peak, the nearest higher neighbor. Mount Carl Heller ranks as the 105th-highest summit in California. Topographic relief is significant as the west aspect rises approximately 1,755 feet (535 meters) above Wallace Lake in 0.38 miles (0.61 km).

== History ==
The first ascent of the summit was made in August 1966 by Carl Heller and Al Green via the East Arête.

This landform is unofficially named after Dr. Carl Anthony Heller (1922–1984), founder of the China Lake Mountain Rescue Group in 1958. His group's search and rescue operations in the Mount Whitney area saved many. He was a research chemist and mountaineer who made the first ascent of this peak. This feature has also been called "Vacation Peak", in association with its position immediately above Vacation Pass.

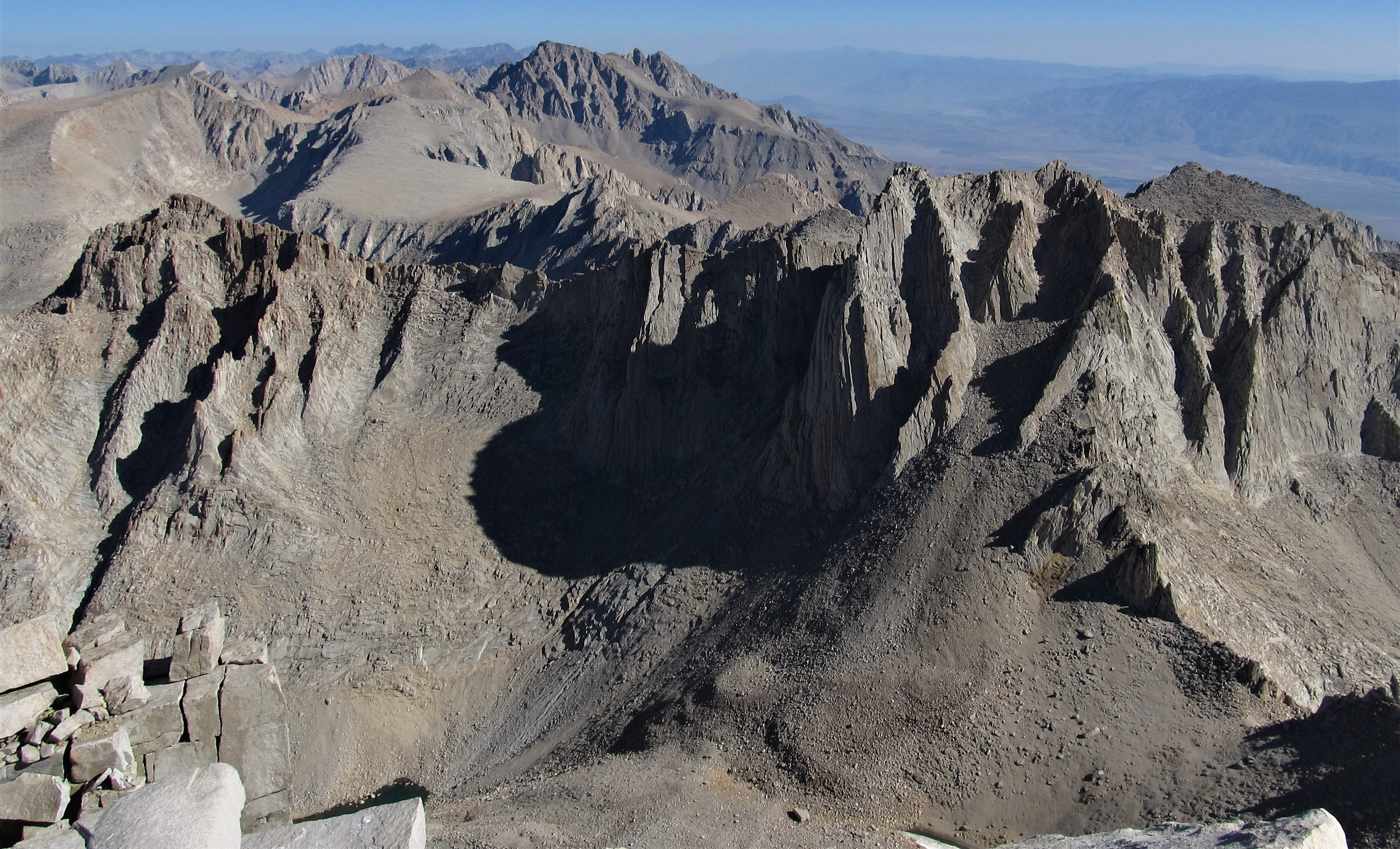
Peaks seen from Mount Whitney summit. Mount Carl Heller near center (see file annotations for identifications)

== Climate ==
According to the Köppen climate classification system, Mount Carl Heller is located in an alpine climate zone. Most weather fronts originate in the Pacific Ocean, and travel east toward the Sierra Nevada mountains. As fronts approach, they are forced upward by the peaks (orographic lift), causing them to drop their moisture in the form of rain or snowfall onto the range. Precipitation runoff from this mountain drains west to the Kern River via Wallace Creek, and east to Owens Valley via George Creek.

== See also ==
- List of mountain peaks of California
