= Pacific Tarn =

Small lake in the Colorado Rocky Mountains

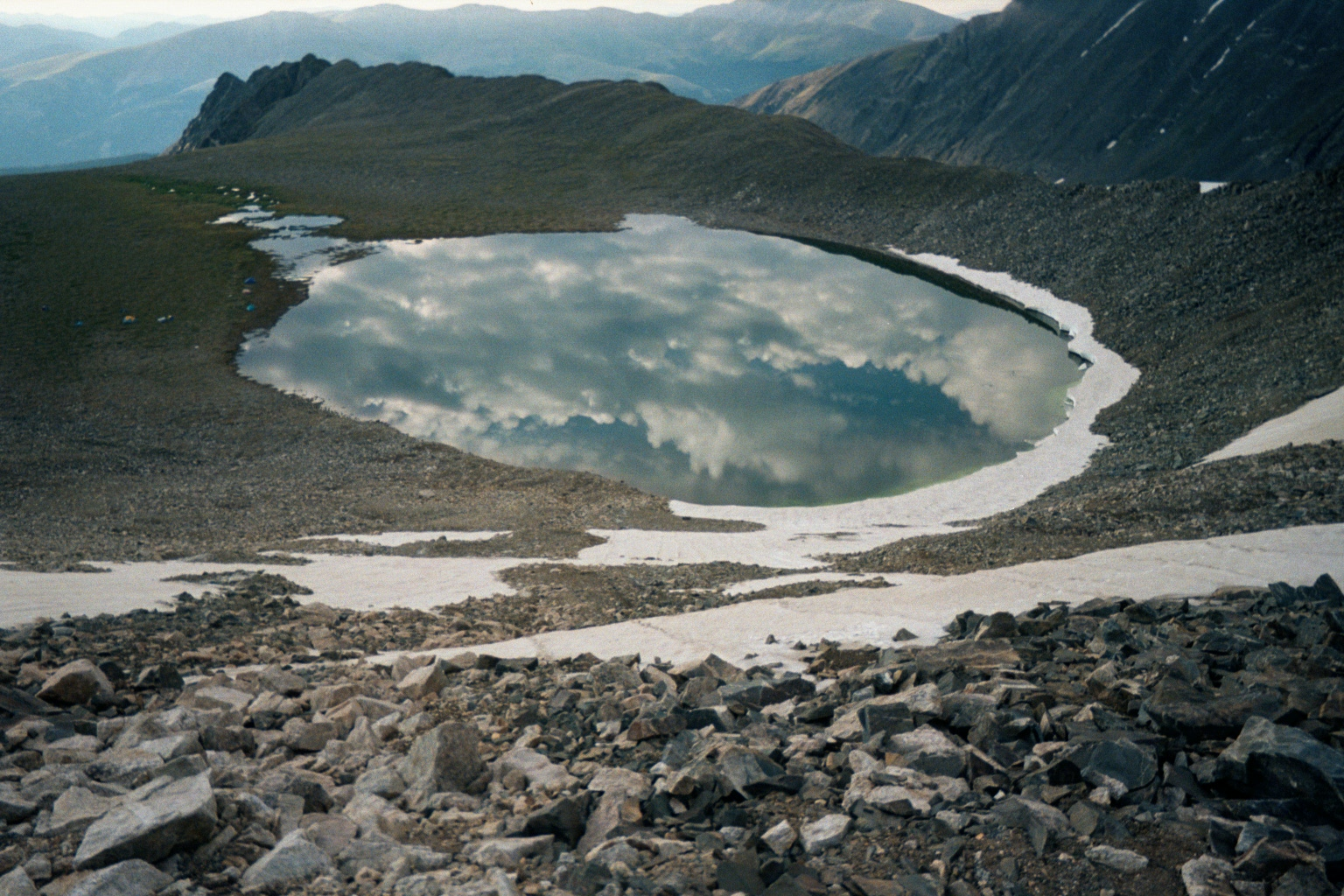
- Pacific Tarn in the Tenmile Range of Colorado

- Location within Colorado Location within the United States
- Location: Summit County, Colorado, United States
- Coordinates: 39°25′11″N 106°07′11″W
- Basin countries: United States
- Max. length: 560 ft (170 m)
- Max. width: 464 ft (141 m)
- Surface area: 4.7 acres (1.9 ha)
- Max. depth: 28 ft (8.5 m)
- Surface elevation: 13,420 ft (4,090 m)

Pacific Tarn is a small lake located in the Colorado Rocky Mountains in the United States. It is notable for its 13,420 foot (4,090 m) elevation, making it the highest lake in the United States whose name is recognized by the United States Board on Geographic Names, surpassing other lakes such as Hawaii's Lake Waiau on Mauna Kea, and California's Tulainyo Lake near Mount Whitney.

The lake sits atop the broad eastern ridge of Pacific Peak in the Tenmile Range.

Efforts to name the lake were spearheaded by Carl Drews, a Boulder, Colorado resident who organized an expedition to the lake in 2002 to measure the size, depth and water chemistry. The lake remained unnamed until January 8, 2004, when the United States Board on Geographic Names officially approved the name Pacific Tarn for the lake.

The first scuba dive in the lake occurred on September 7, 2013.

== See also ==
- List of lakes in Colorado
