= Atlantic Peak (Colorado) =

Mountain in the state of Colorado

- Peak 13,841
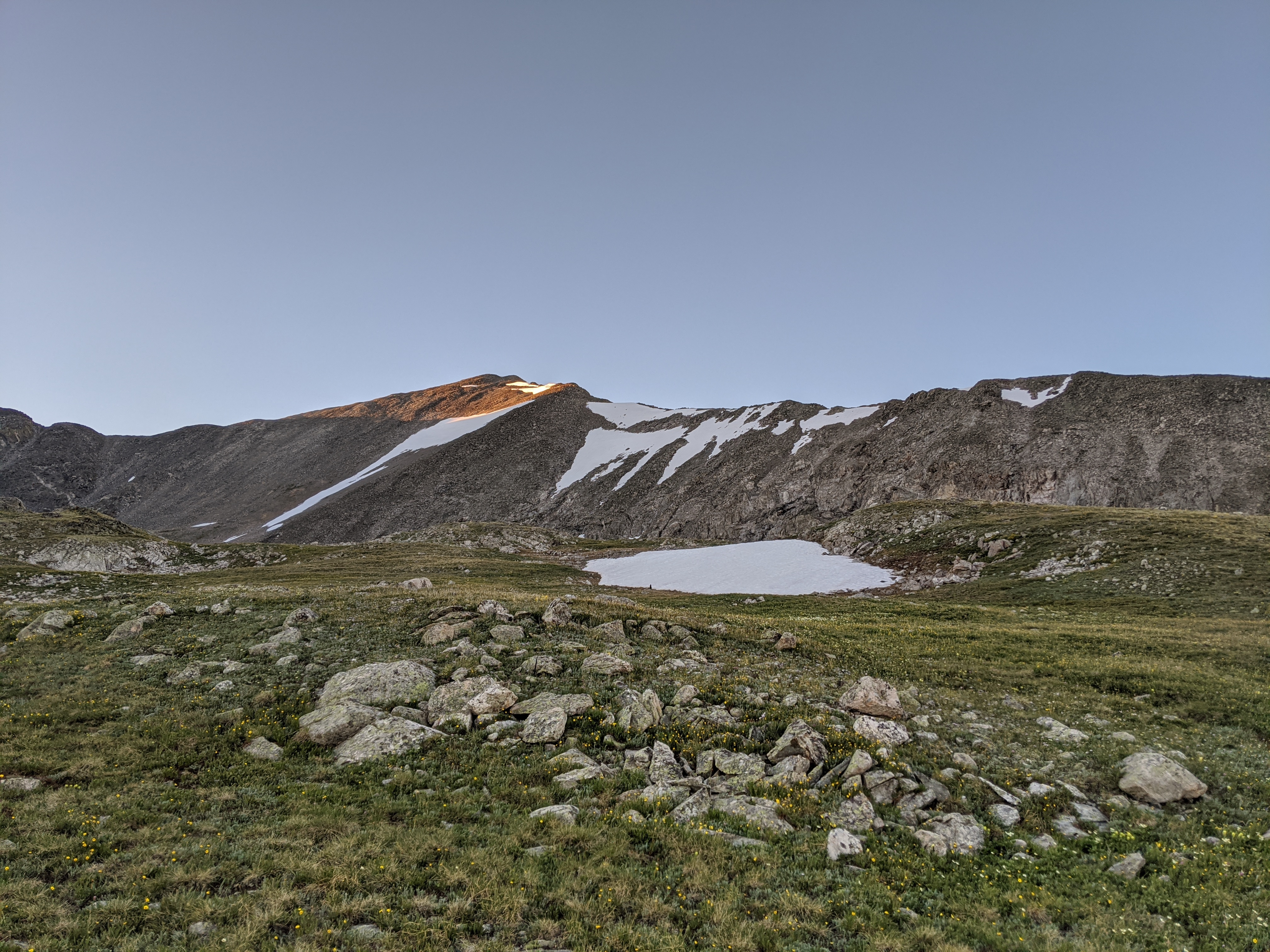

Highest point
- Elevation: 13,835 ft (4,217 m)
- Parent peak: Fletcher Mountain
- Coordinates: 39°24′48″N 106°7′28″W

Geography
- Location within Colorado
- Location: Summit County, Colorado, U.S.
- Parent range: Tenmile Range
- Topo map(s): USGS 7.5' topographic map Breckenridge, Colorado; Copper Mountain

Atlantic Peak, elevation 13,835 ft (4,217 m), is a summit in the Tenmile Range of central Colorado. The peak is southwest of Breckenridge in the Arapaho National Forest. Its summit is visible close by to the northwest from the summit of Quandary Peak, a popular 14er in Colorado. It is often hiked together with nearby Pacific Peak.

== See also ==
- List of Colorado mountain ranges
- List of Colorado mountain summits
  - List of Colorado fourteeners
  - List of Colorado 4000 meter prominent summits
  - List of the most prominent summits of Colorado
- List of Colorado county high points
