= Pacific Peak =

Mountain in Colorado, United States

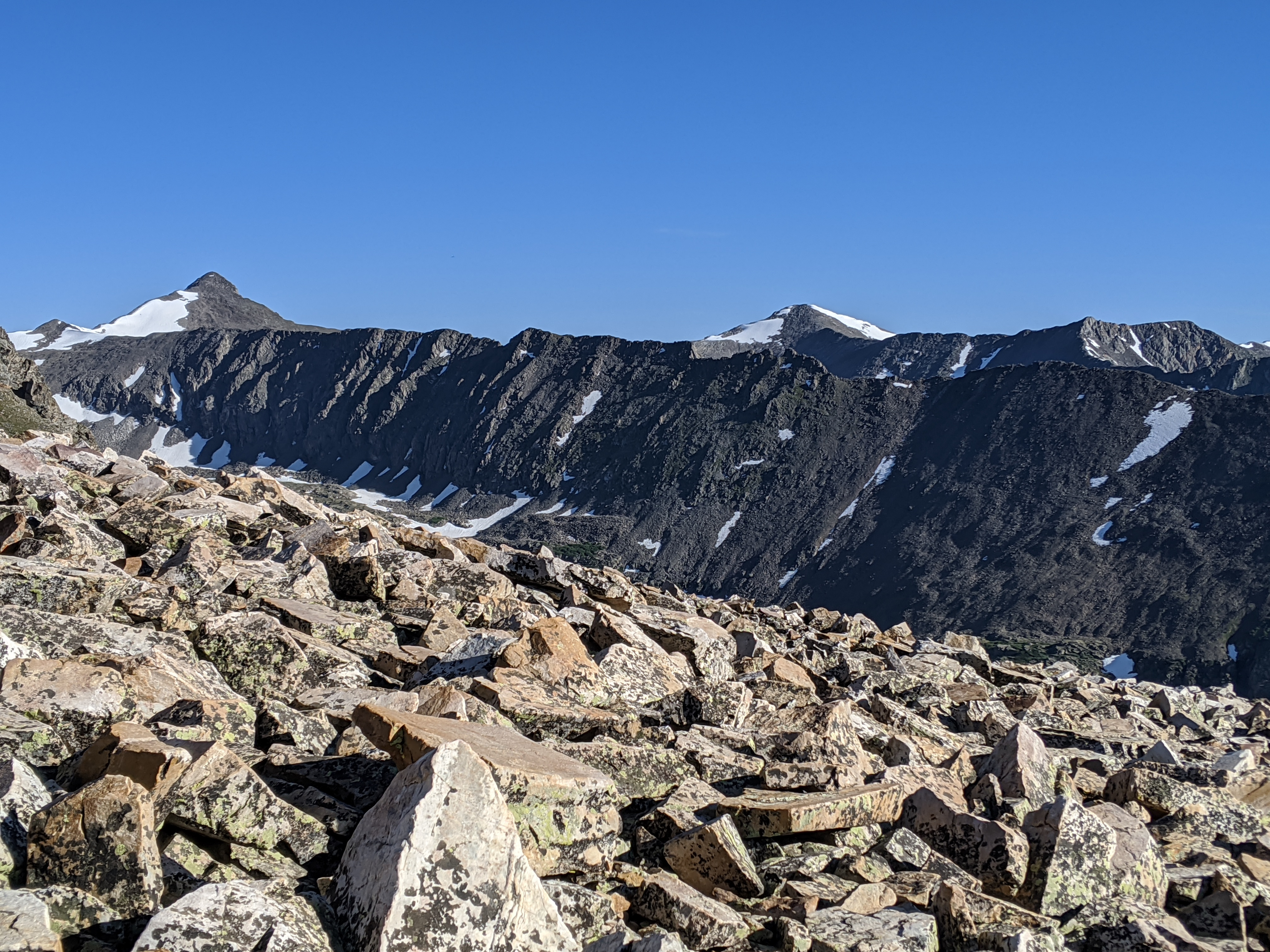

Highest point
- Elevation: 13,957 ft (4,254 m)
- Prominence: 570 ft (174 m)
- Parent peak: Fletcher Mountain
- Isolation: 1.41 mi (2.27 km)
- Coordinates: 39°25′23″N 106°07′24″W

Geography
- Location within Colorado
- Location: Summit County, Colorado, U.S.
- Parent range: Mosquito Range
- Topo map(s): USGS 7.5' topographic map Breckenridge, Colorado

Pacific Peak, elevation 13,957 ft (4,254 m), is a summit in the Mosquito Range of central Colorado. The peak is southwest of Breckenridge in the Arapaho National Forest. Its long east ridge is prominently visible across the valley to the north when hiking Quandary Peak, a popular 14er in Colorado. It is often hiked together with nearby Atlantic Peak. Pacific Tarn, the highest officially named lake in the United States, lies high on the eastern flank of the peak.

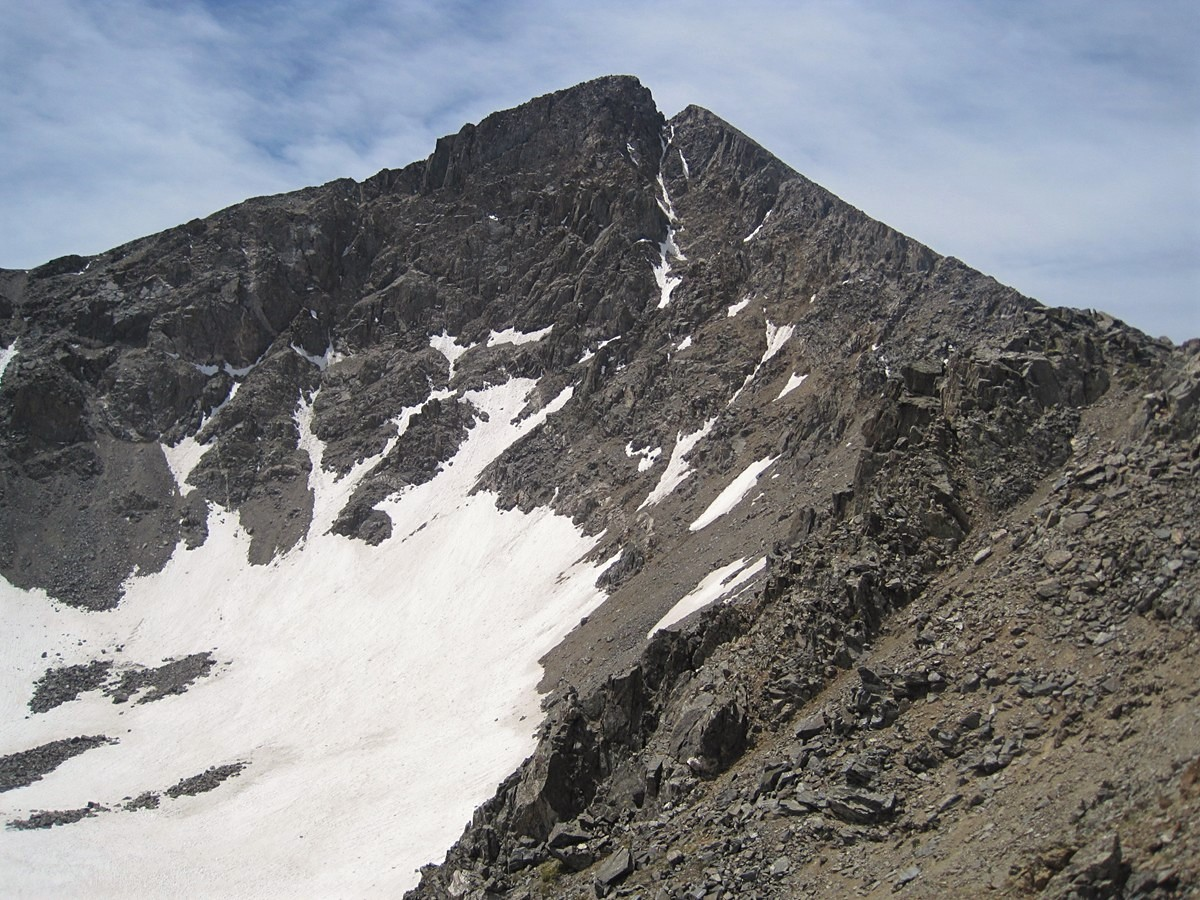
Pacific Peak

== See also ==
- List of Colorado mountain ranges
- List of Colorado mountain summits
  - List of Colorado fourteeners
  - List of Colorado 4000 meter prominent summits
  - List of the most prominent summits of Colorado
- List of Colorado county high points
