= Hawthorne Nevada Airlines Flight 708 =

1969 aviation accident

Coordinates: 36°34′N 118°16′W

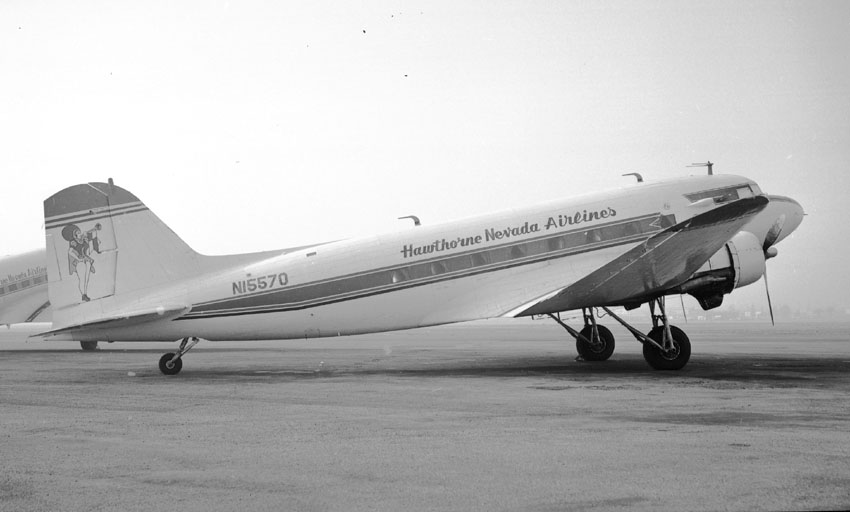
- N15570, the aircraft involved, seen in 1965

Accident
- Date: February 18, 1969
- Summary: Controlled flight into terrain, pilot error
- Site: Mount Whitney, Inyo County, near Lone Pine, California, United States

Aircraft
- Aircraft type: Douglas DC-3
- Operator: Hawthorne Nevada Airlines
- Registration: N15570
- Flight origin: Hawthorne, Nevada
- Destination: Burbank, California
- Occupants: 35
- Passengers: 32
- Crew: 3
- Fatalities: 35
- Survivors: 0

Hawthorne Nevada Airlines Flight 708 was a domestic scheduled passenger flight between Hawthorne Municipal Airport, Nevada (HTH/KTHT) and Burbank Airport, California (BUR/KBUR) that crashed into terrain near the tallest mountain in the contiguous United States, Mount Whitney, near Lone Pine, on February 18, 1969, killing all 35 passengers and crew on board.

== Airline ==
Mineral County Airlines dba Hawthorne Nevada Airlines (HNA) was a Burbank-based air taxi operator formed by the owners of the El Capitan Casino in Hawthorne, Nevada. In 1963, the Civil Aeronautics Board (CAB), a now-defunct Federal agency which at the time tightly regulated almost all commercial air transportation in the United States, authorized HNA to operate a Douglas DC-3 from Long Beach and Los Angeles to Hawthorne via exemption (an exception from CAB regulations that would otherwise prevent it). Prior to N, El Capitan had relied on Blatz Airlines, a so-called supplemental air carrier, to operate DC-3s and Douglas DC-4s to Hawthorne from Los Angeles, but the CAB shut Blatz in 1962.

In 1967, the CAB expanded HNA's authority to encompass two DC-3s and a Lockheed L-049 Constellation and in 1968 allowed it to fly to Hawthorne from the San Francisco Bay Area as well. Shortly after the accident, HNA changed its name to Air Nevada and ceased all operation by 1970.

== History of flight ==
Flight 708, flown with a Douglas DC-3, was operating on a visual flight rules plan and was scheduled to depart 4am, but actually departed 3:50am, PST. Last contact was made at 4:06 A.M. when the flight spoke with the Tonopah Flight Service Station. One hour later, at 5:10am. the plane hit a sheer cliff face north of Mount Whitney, near Tulainyo Lake at 11,770 feet (3,558 m). The main body of the wreckage then slid down the cliff and stopped some 500 feet (152 m) back from the cliff, where it caught fire. All 32 passengers and 3 crew members were killed. The time of impact was determined by stopped watches at the site. The crew consisted of Captain Fred Hall (43), and first officer Raymond Hamer (41), and one flight attendant, Patricia Nannes (21).

== Search and rescue operation ==
Extensive searches from air and ground were launched after the aircraft went missing, but snow, low clouds, and mountainous terrain hampered the search. A search aircraft crashed (without fatalities) on Mount Tom during the search. The aircraft was finally located on August 8, 1969. A helicopter visiting the site also crashed, also without fatalities. The delay likely did not affect survivability, as the crash was viewed as nonsurvivable.

== Investigation ==
The National Transportation Safety Board launched an extensive investigation upon the location of the wreckage. It gave the probable cause as follows:

The Board determines that the probable cause of this accident was the deviation from the prescribed route of flight, as authorized in the company's FAA-approved operations specifications, resulting in the aircraft being operated under IFR weather conditions, in high mountainous terrain, in an area where there was a lack of radio navigation aids.

== Bibliography ==
- Aircraft Accident Report: Mineral County Airlines d.b.a. Hawthorne Nevada Airlines, DC-3, N15570, Near Lone Pine, California, February 18, 1969 (Report). Washington, DC: National Transportation Safety Board. February 4, 1970. hdl:2027/ien.35556029986262. File No. 3-2594.
- "Accident Douglas C-49J (DC-3) N15570, Tuesday 18 February 1969". aviation-safety.org. Aviation Safety Network.
