= Hawthorne Industrial Airport =

- IATA: HTH; ICAO: KHTH; FAA LID: HTH

Summary
- Airport type: Public
- Owner: Mineral County
- Serves: Hawthorne, Nevada
- Elevation AMSL: 4,230 ft (1,290 m)
- Coordinates: 38°32′40″N 118°38′03″W
- Interactive map of Hawthorne Industrial Airport

Runways
| Direction | Length | | Surface |
| Direction | ft | m | Surface |
|---|---|---|---|
| 10/28 | 6,000 | 1,829 | Asphalt |
| 15/33 | 3,250 | 991 | Dirt |

Statistics (2022)
- Aircraft operations (year ending 6/30/2022): 13,690
- Source: Federal Aviation Administration

Hawthorne Industrial Airport (IATA: HTH, ICAO: KHTH, FAA LID: HTH) is a county-owned public-use airport located one mile (2 km) north of the central business district of Hawthorne, in Mineral County, Nevada, United States. It was formerly known as Hawthorne Municipal Airport.

== Facilities and aircraft ==
Hawthorne Industrial Airport covers an area of 901 acres (365 ha) which contains two runways: 10/28 with a 6,000 x 100 ft (1,829 x 30 m) asphalt pavement and 15/33 with a 3,250 x 130 ft (991 x 40 m) dirt surface.

For the 12-month period ending June 30, 2022, the airport had 13,690 aircraft operations, an average of 37 per day: 89% general aviation, 5% air taxi and 5% military.

== Historical airline service ==
Bonanza Airlines flew to Hawthorne in the 1950s, while Air Chaparral provided service in the early 1980s.

From 1963 through 1969, Hawthorne was served by Hawthorne Nevada Airlines (HNA), formed by the owners of the El Capitan Casino. HNA had two Douglas DC-3s and a Lockheed L-049 Constellation and flew to Hawthorne from Long Beach, Los Angeles and the San Francisco Bay Area. Prior to starting HNA, El Capitan relied on DC-3s and Douglas DC-4s flown to Hawthorne by Blatz Airlines, a so-called supplemental air carrier.

== See also ==
- List of airports in Nevada
