= Mount Russell (California) =

Mountain in the state of California

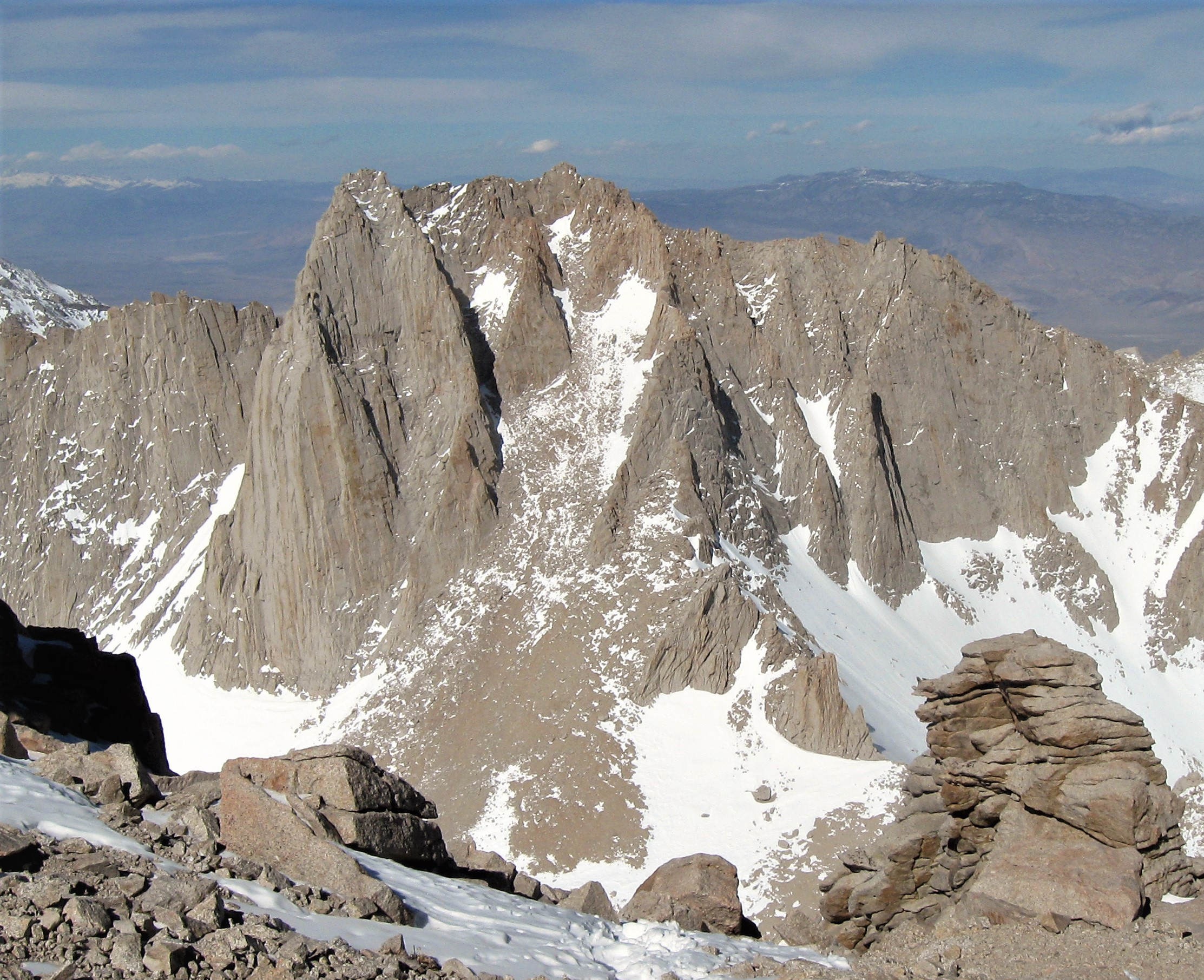
- The south face of Mount Russell viewed from atop Mount Whitney

Highest point
- Elevation: 14,094 ft (4,296 m) NAVD 88
- Prominence: 1,096 ft (334 m)
- Parent peak: Mount Whitney
- Listing: California fourteeners 7th; SPS Mountaineers peak; Western States Climbers Star peak
- Coordinates: 36°35′26″N 118°17′21″W

Geography
- Location within California
- Location: Inyo and Tulare counties California, U.S.
- Parent range: Sierra Nevada
- Topo map: USGS Mount Whitney

Climbing
- First ascent: June 24, 1926 by Norman Clyde
- Easiest route: Exposed Scramble, class 3

Mount Russell is a peak in the Sierra Nevada mountain range in the U.S. state of California, about 0.8 miles (1.3 km) north of Mount Whitney. Possessing an elevation of 14,094 feet (4,296 m), it is the seventh-highest peak in the state and one of California's twelve fourteeners.

== Geography ==
Mount Russell is located on the Sierra Crest, which in this area marks the boundary between the John Muir Wilderness, the Inyo National Forest and Sequoia National Park; and the boundary between Inyo County and Tulare County. It rises just southwest of Tulainyo Lake, one of the highest and largest of the alpine lakes of the southern Sierra.

== History ==
The peak was named for Israel Cook Russell, an American geologist who was a member of the Wheeler Survey and who was best known for his explorations in Alaska.

== Climbing ==
The first ascent of Mount Russell was on June 24, 1926, by famed Sierra mountaineer Norman Clyde. It offers climbers at least a dozen routes, from multiple scrambling routes (class 3) to a serious technical route (Grade IV, 5.10).

Mount Russell sees far less traffic than its much more famous neighbor Mount Whitney. However, since its southern and eastern slopes fall in the Mount Whitney Zone of the Inyo National Forest, these approaches are governed by stricter access limits. From May to October, only ten people per day are permitted to enter the North Fork of Lone Pine Creek for overnight use. Day-use climbers are grouped with the Whitney Main Trail day-use quota. This puts climbers on Russell's most common approaches in competition with climbers on Whitney's popular Mountaineer's Route, and also with the Main Trail users.

== See also ==
- List of California fourteeners
- Mount Randy Morgenson
