= Cristo Couloir =

Couloir located on Quandary Peak

Coordinates: 39.391864°N 106.104627°W

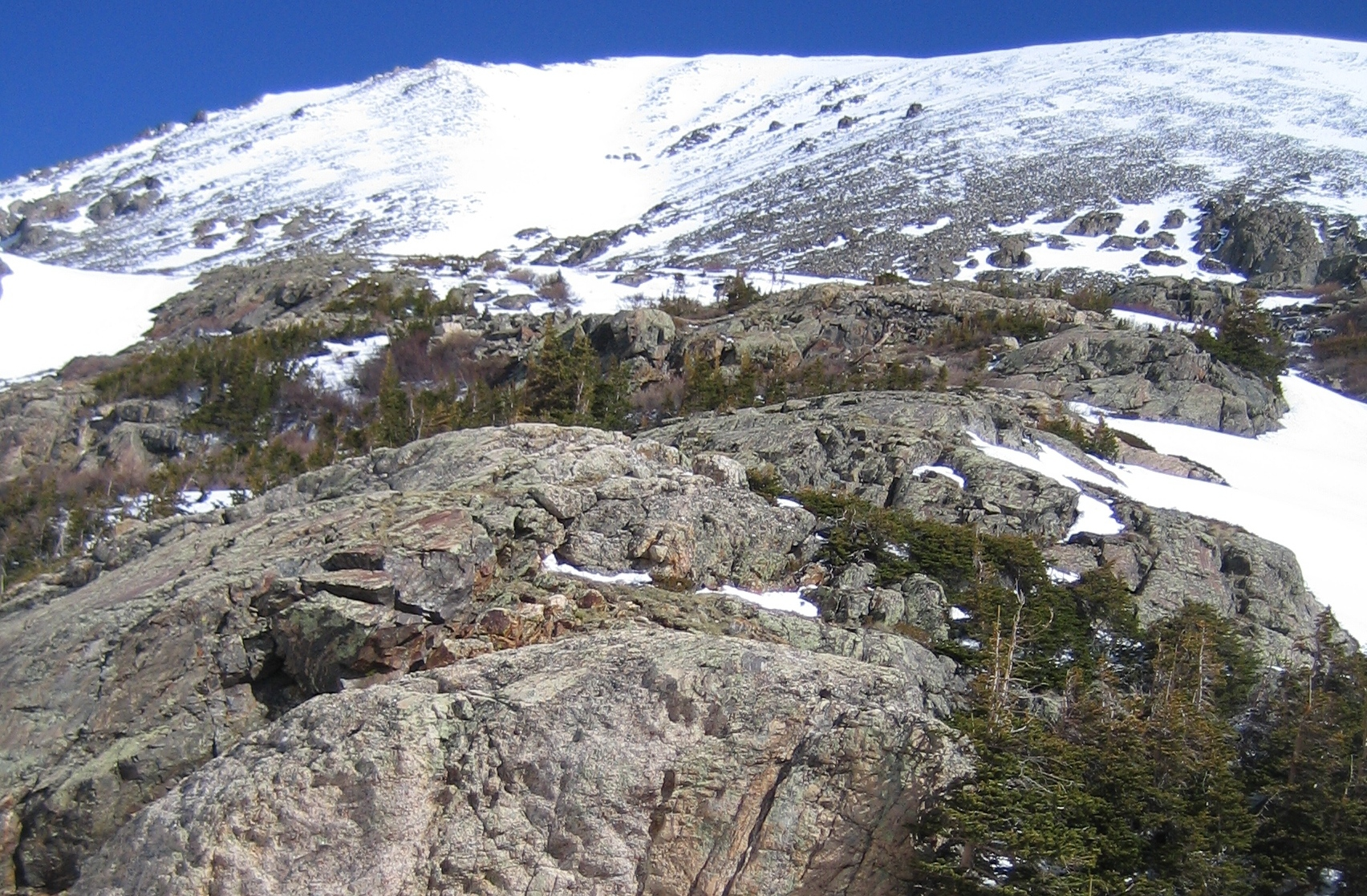
Cristo Couloir

Cristo Couloir, Quandary Peak, is a 2,575 feet (785 m) couloir located on Quandary Peak that stretches from just above the Blue Lakes Dam to the summit at 14,265 feet (4,348 m). It is a popular ski mountaineering descent in the spring climbing season (April through June, depending on weather and snow conditions). The ascent can be accomplished by an experienced mountaineer in 3–5 hours and the ski descent in 1–2 hours. Cristo Couloir is actually closer to one mile in length with elevation gain of over 2,000 feet (610 m). The ascent from the base parking lot below the dam is about a mile and 1/2 with a total elevation gain of approximately 2,500 feet (760 m).
