= Quandary Peak =

Mountain in the state of Colorado, United States

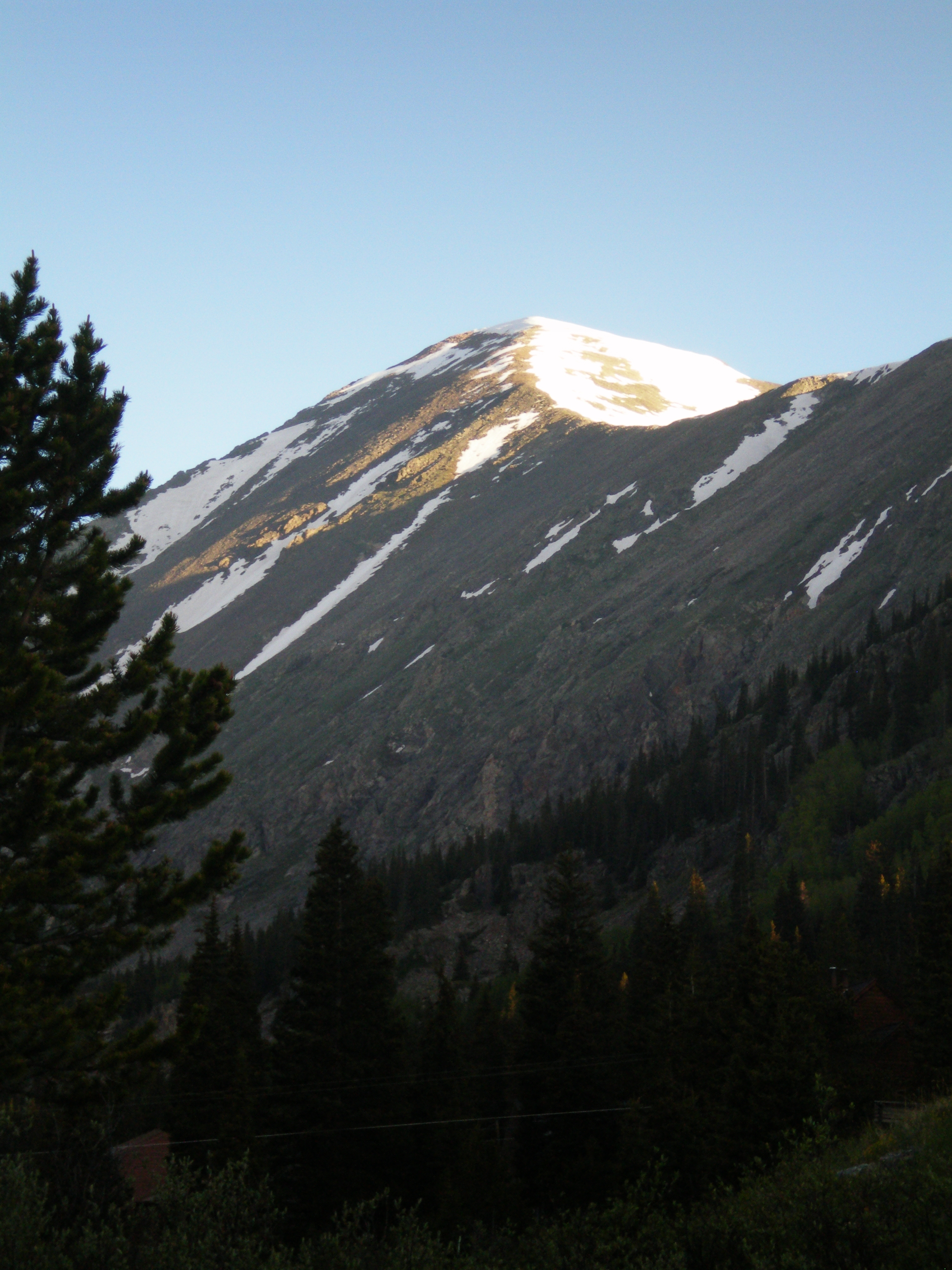

Highest point
- Elevation: 14,271 ft (4,350 m)
- Prominence: 1,125 ft (343 m)
- Parent peak: Mount Lincoln
- Isolation: 3.16 mi (5.09 km)
- Listing: Colorado Fourteener 13th
- Coordinates: 39°23′50″N 106°06′23″W

Geography
- Location within Colorado
- Location: Summit County, Colorado, U.S.
- Parent range: Mosquito Range, Highest summit of the Tenmile Range
- Topo map(s): USGS 7.5' topographic map Breckenridge, Colorado

Climbing
- Easiest route: East Ridge: Hike, class 1

Quandary Peak is the highest summit of the Tenmile Range in the Rocky Mountains of North America at 14,271 ft (4,350 m). As of 2018, it was the most commonly climbed fourteener in Colorado. It has nearly the same elevation as Castle Peak and Mount Blue Sky. It lies in Summit County and within the White River National Forest about 6 miles (10 km) south-southwest of the town of Breckenridge.

== Hiking and skiing ==
The standard route up Quandary Peak is a trail hike (class 1), starting from a trailhead about 1 mile (1.6 km) north of Hoosier Pass and climbing the east ridge. It is a popular fourteener to climb because of the relatively easy ascent and its proximity to Denver and Breckenridge.

Quandary Peak is also popular with backcountry skiers and snowboarders. The gentle ascent makes for an easy climb from the east with less danger from avalanche than on many other fourteeners. The other slopes of the peak are steep and appeal to expert backcountry skiers. One such steep ski mountaineering route is the Cristo Couloir.

In June 2021 the Colorado Fourteeners Initiative announced that Quandary Peak was Colorado's most popular 14'er in 2020. The Initiative's data indicated that the peak saw 49,179 hiker days in 2020. Its popularity caused serious parking problems at the trailheads, prompting local officials to initiate new parking policies in 2021.

== Climate ==
Climate data for Quandary Peak 39.3981 N, 106.1074 W, Elevation: 13,484 ft (4,110 m) (1991–2020 normals)
Month	Jan	Feb	Mar	Apr	May	Jun	Jul	Aug	Sep	Oct	Nov	Dec	Year
Mean daily maximum °F (°C)	19.6 (−6.9)	18.8 (−7.3)	25.6 (−3.6)	32.6 (0.3)	40.9 (4.9)	51.7 (10.9)	58.0 (14.4)	55.5 (13.1)	49.6 (9.8)	38.3 (3.5)	26.4 (−3.1)	19.7 (−6.8)	36.4 (2.4)
Daily mean °F (°C)	9.3 (−12.6)	8.6 (−13.0)	14.2 (−9.9)	20.3 (−6.5)	29.1 (−1.6)	39.0 (3.9)	45.5 (7.5)	43.8 (6.6)	37.4 (3.0)	27.0 (−2.8)	16.5 (−8.6)	9.7 (−12.4)	25.0 (−3.9)
Mean daily minimum °F (°C)	−0.9 (−18.3)	−1.5 (−18.6)	2.8 (−16.2)	8.1 (−13.3)	17.3 (−8.2)	26.4 (−3.1)	32.9 (0.5)	32.0 (0.0)	25.3 (−3.7)	15.7 (−9.1)	6.6 (−14.1)	−0.3 (−17.9)	13.7 (−10.2)
Average precipitation inches (mm)	2.50 (64)	2.49 (63)	2.92 (74)	3.68 (93)	2.69 (68)	1.41 (36)	2.75 (70)	2.82 (72)	2.01 (51)	2.10 (53)	2.40 (61)	2.35 (60)	30.12 (765)
Source: PRISM Climate Group

== Gallery ==
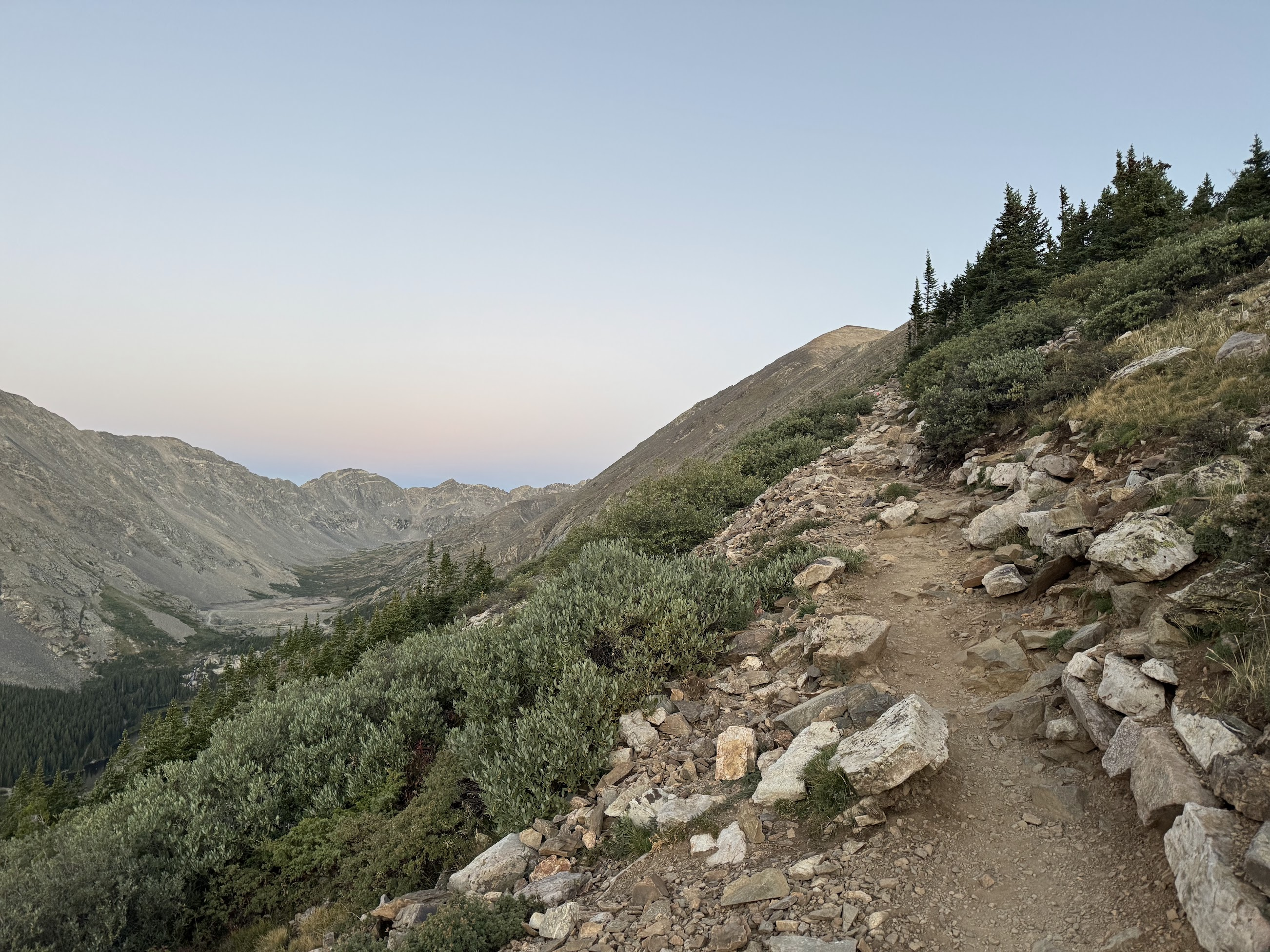
Lower East Ridge Trail

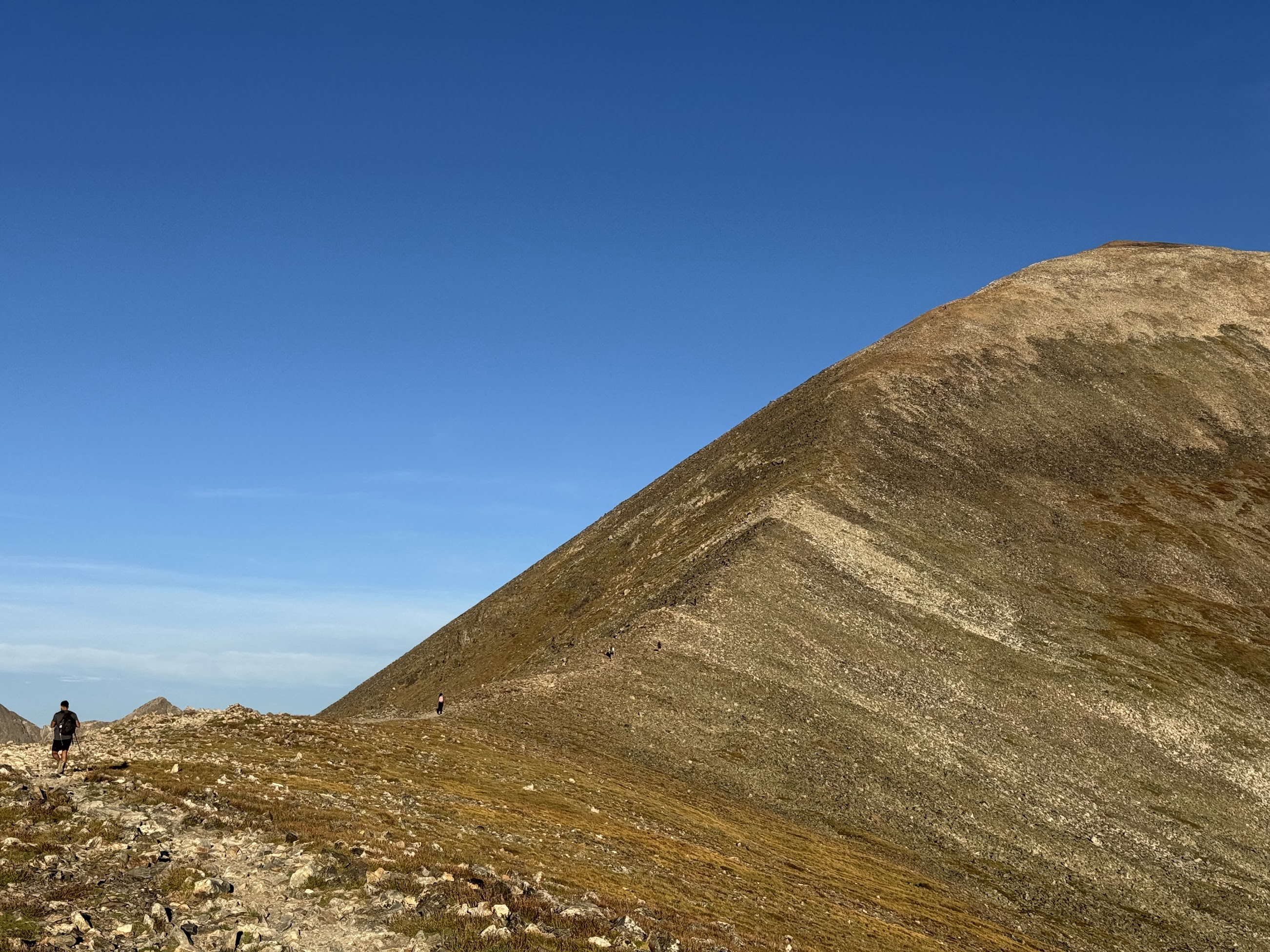
Upper East Ridge in August

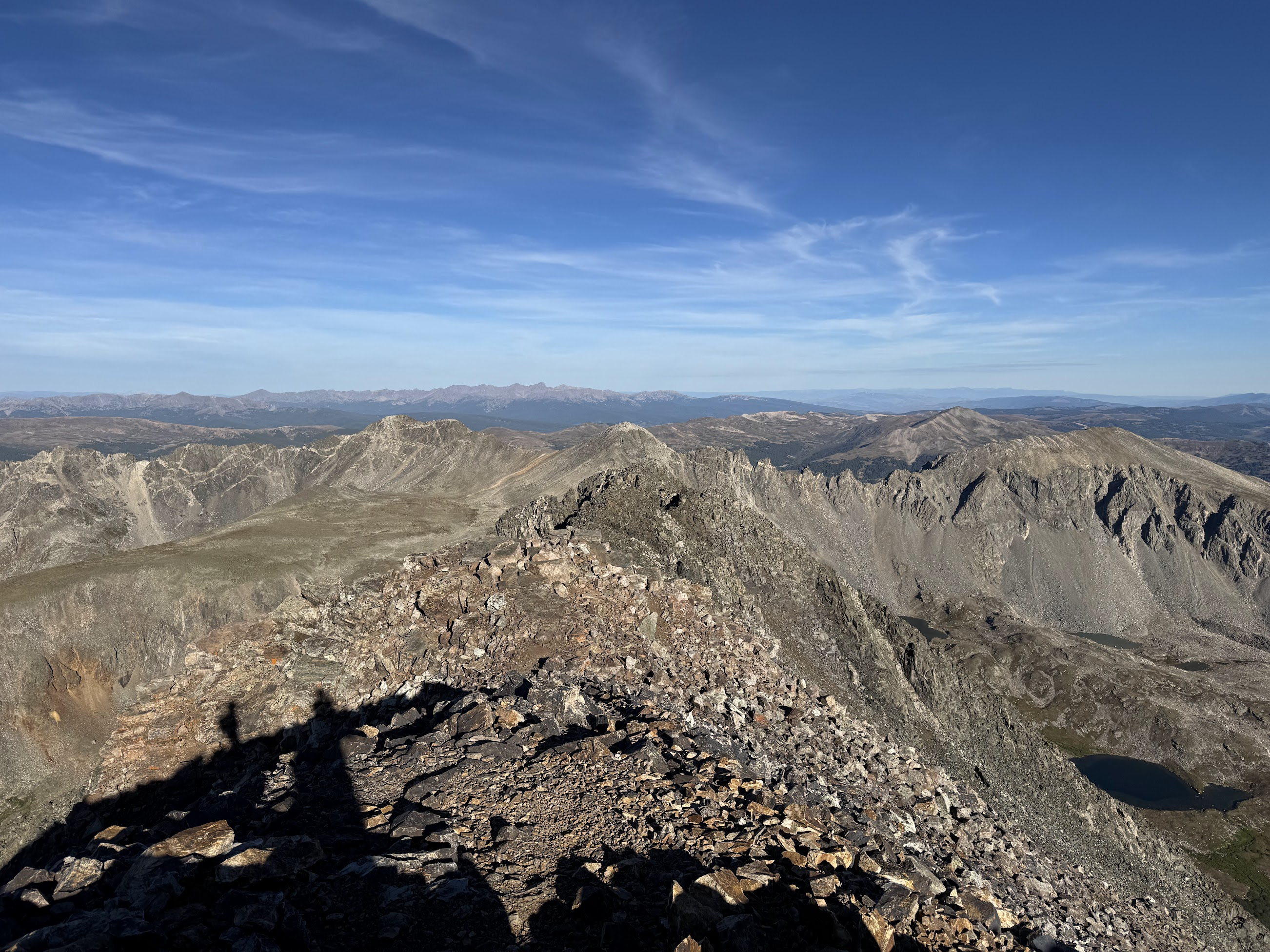
West Ridge From Summit

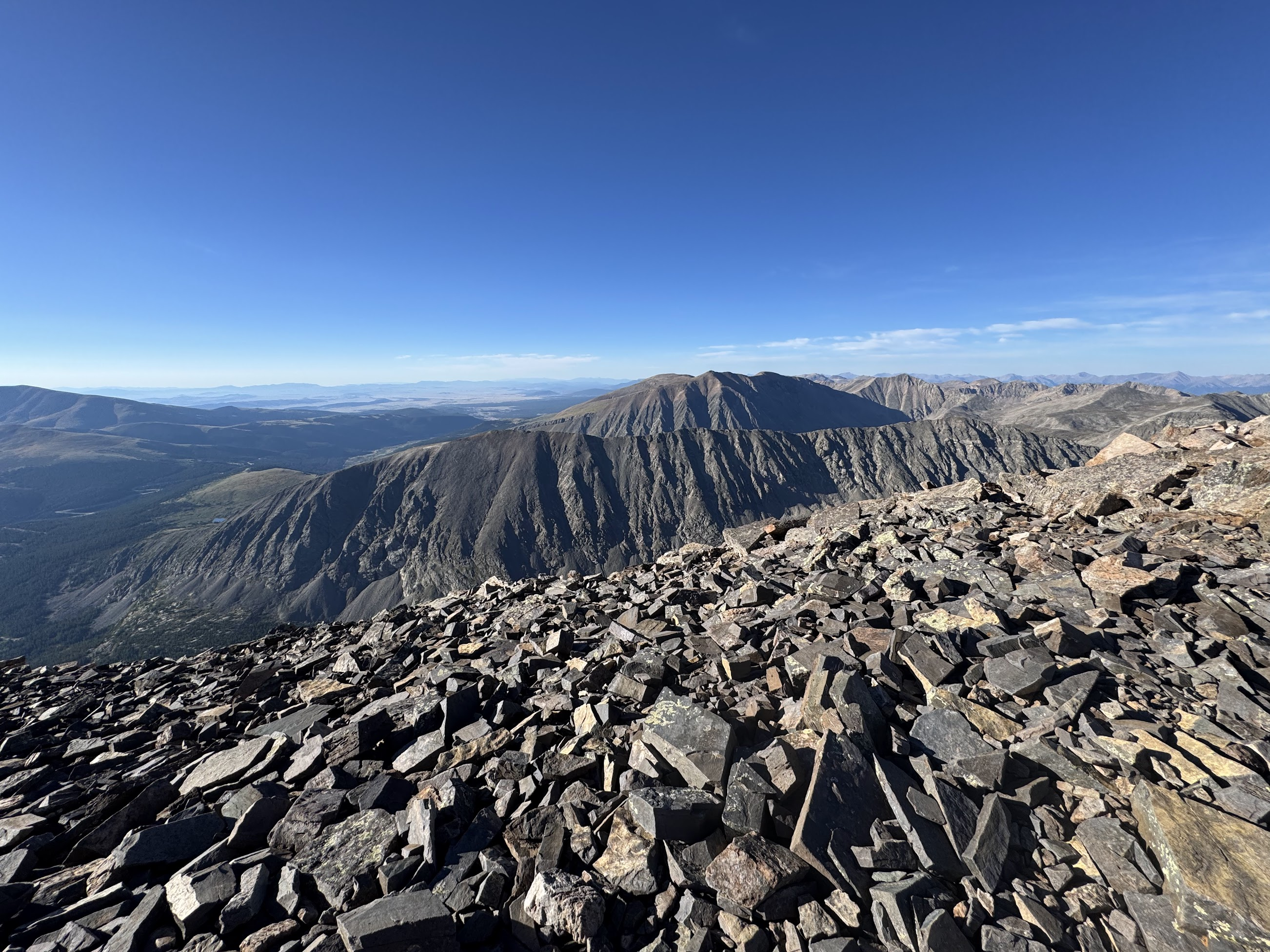
View South From Summit

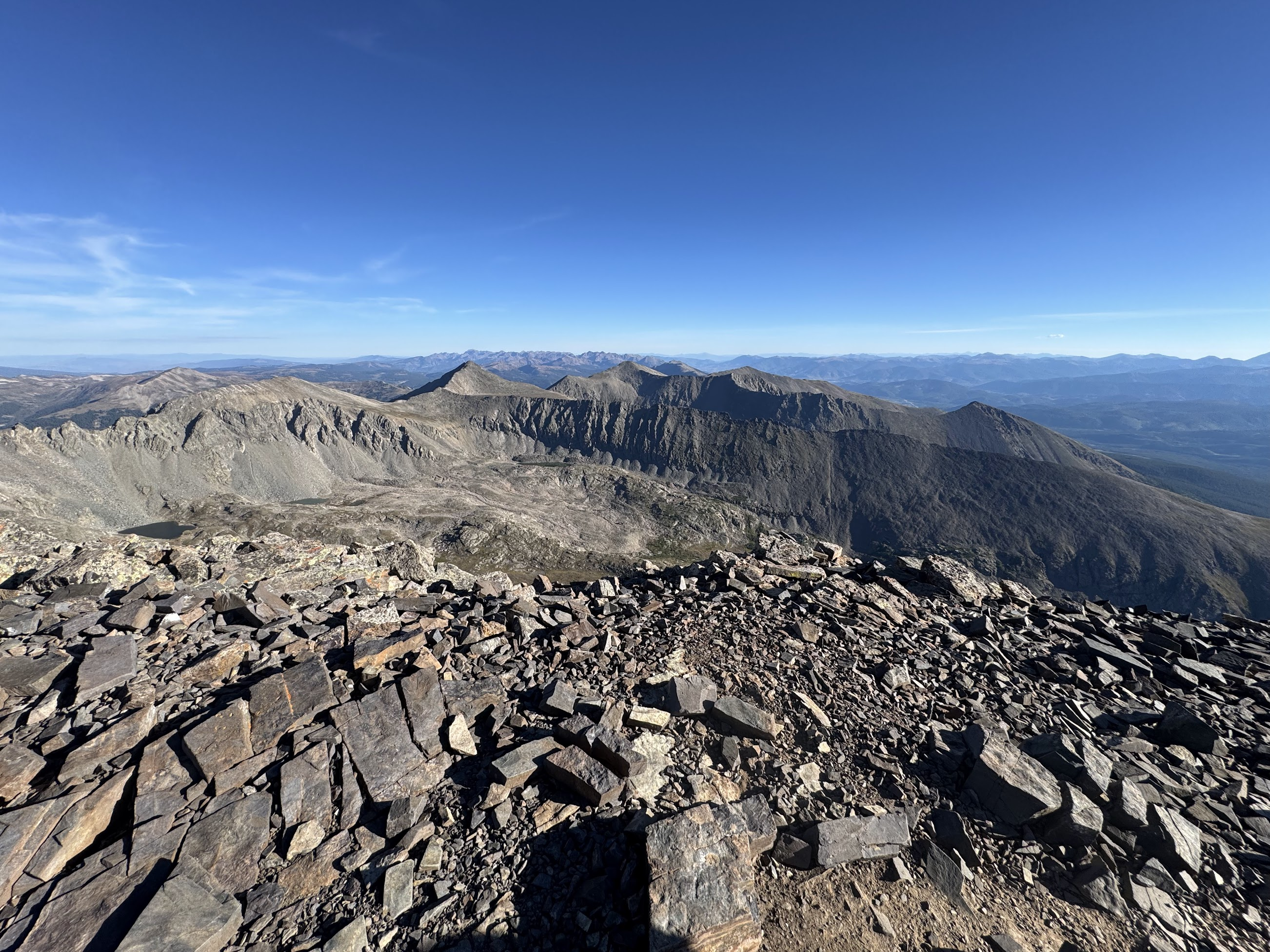
View North From Summit

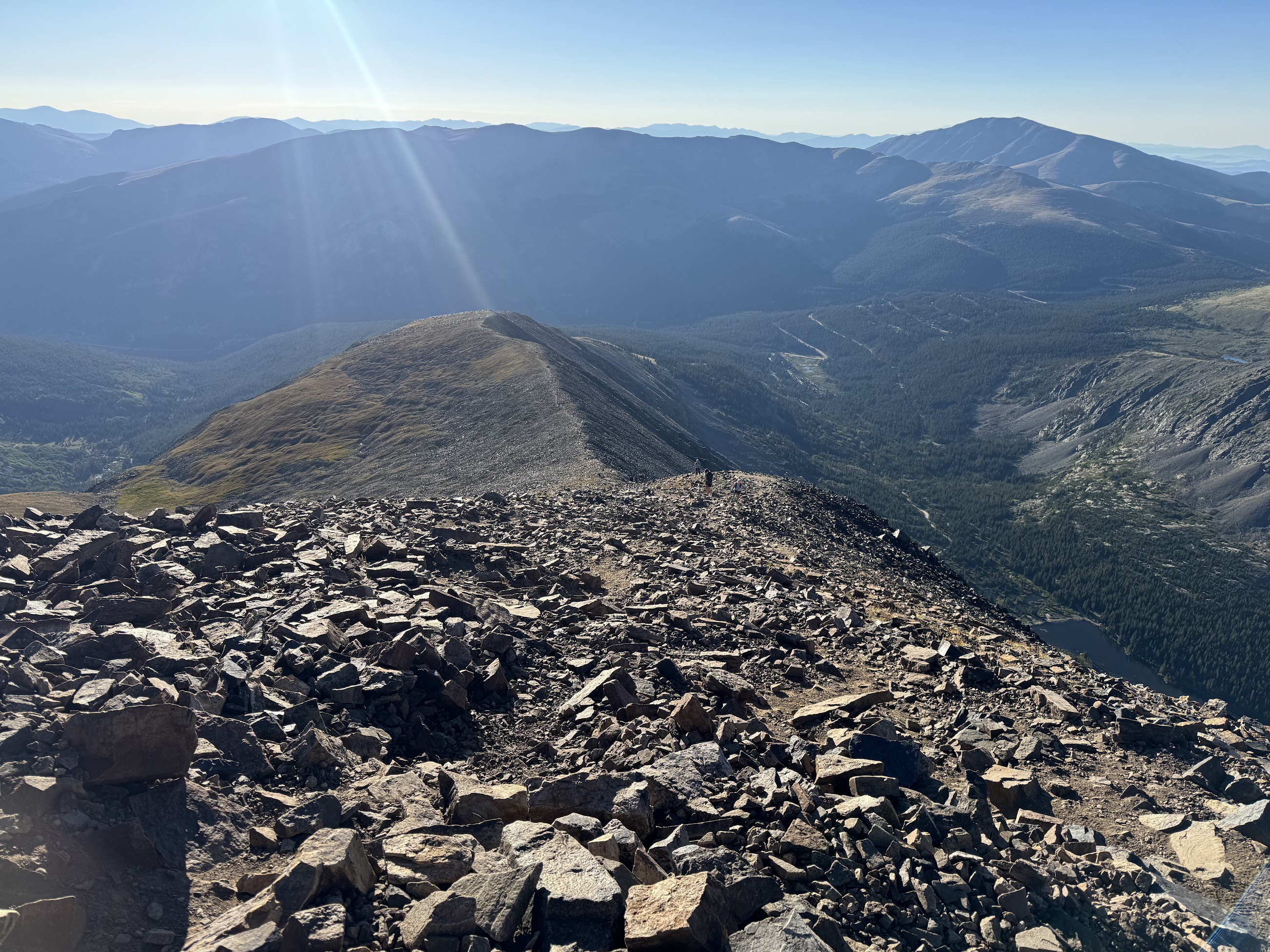
East Ridge of Quandary Peak From Near Summit

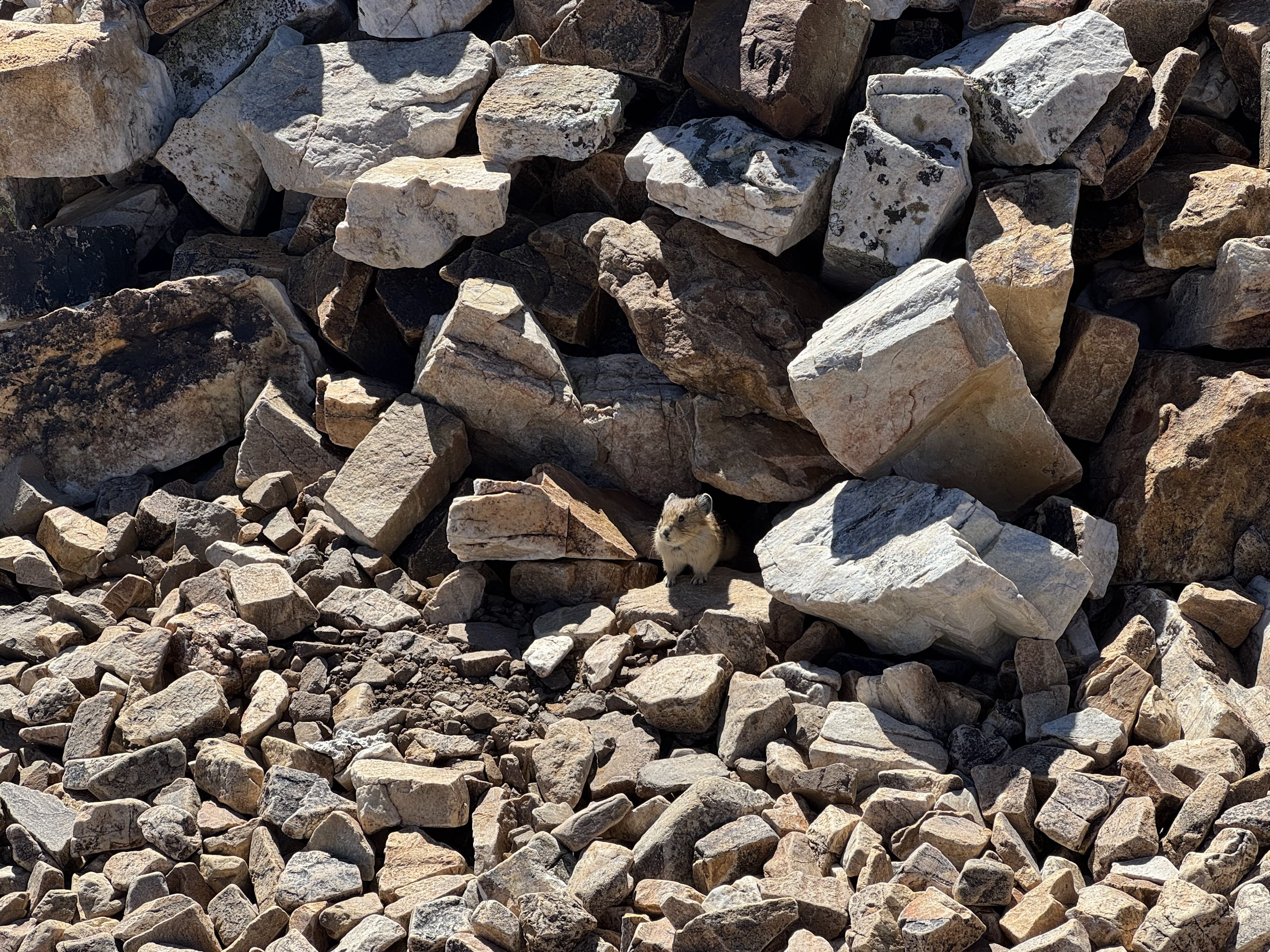
Pika on Quandary Peak

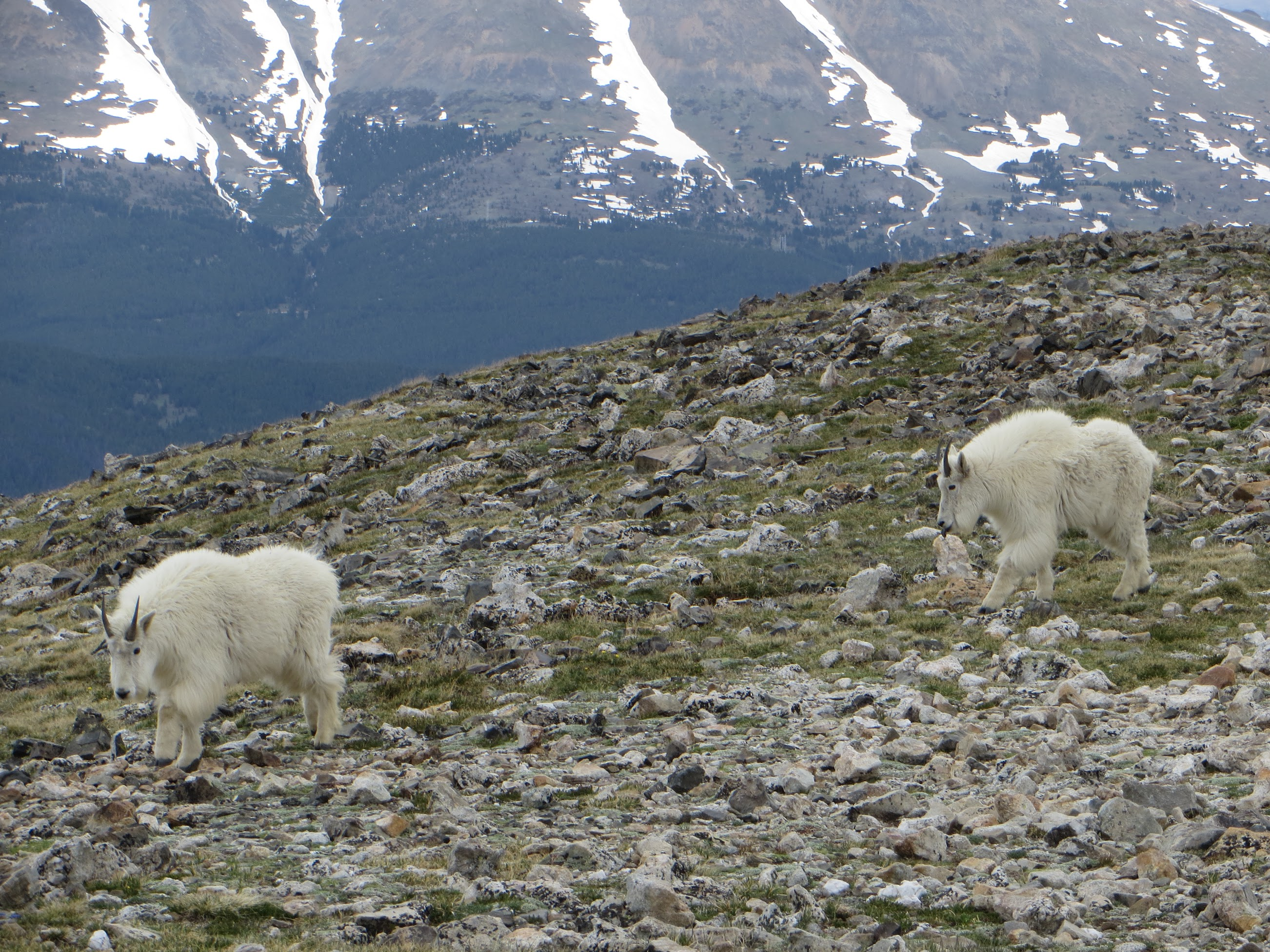
Mountain Goats on Quandary Peak

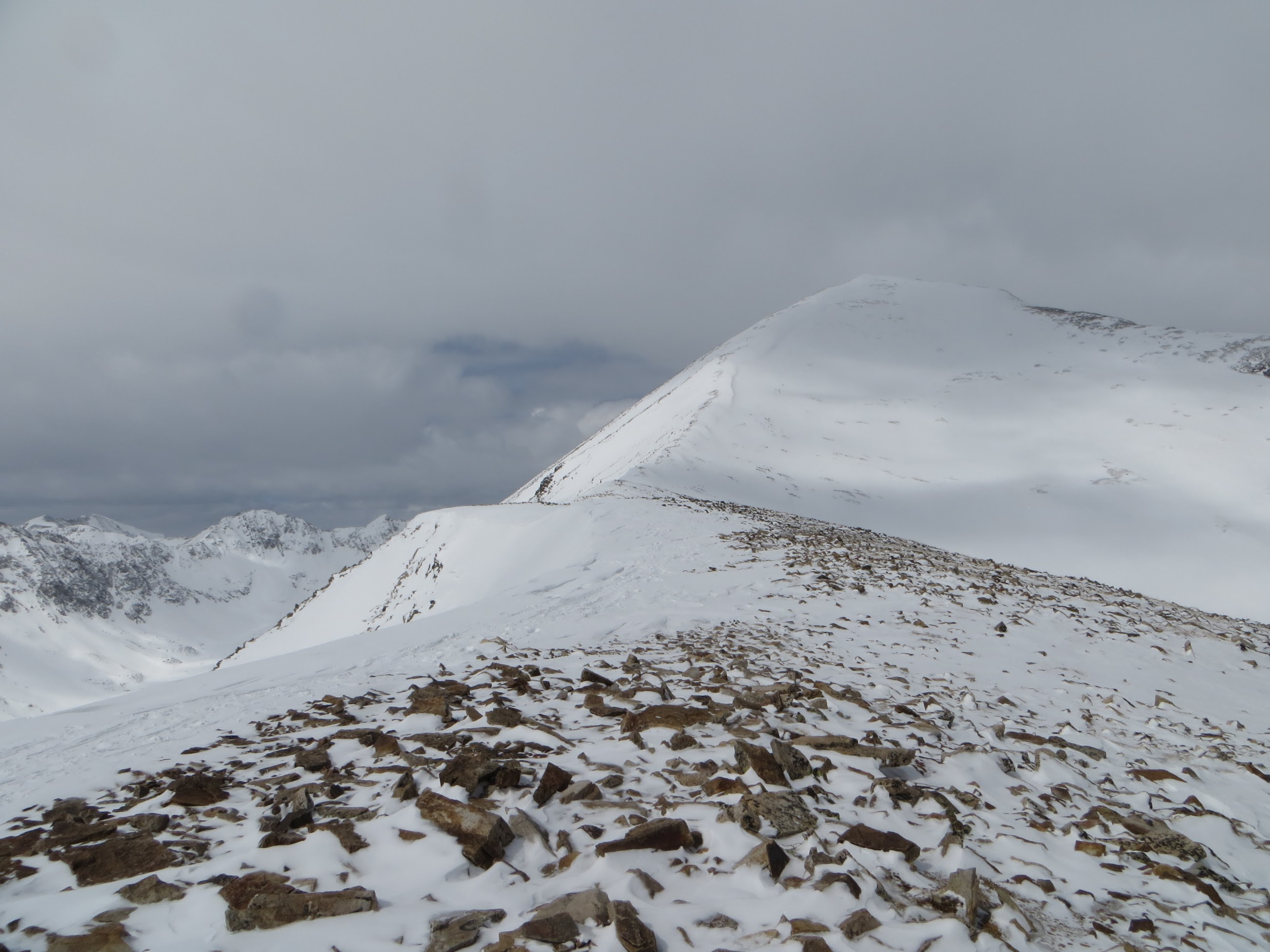
Upper East Ridge in March

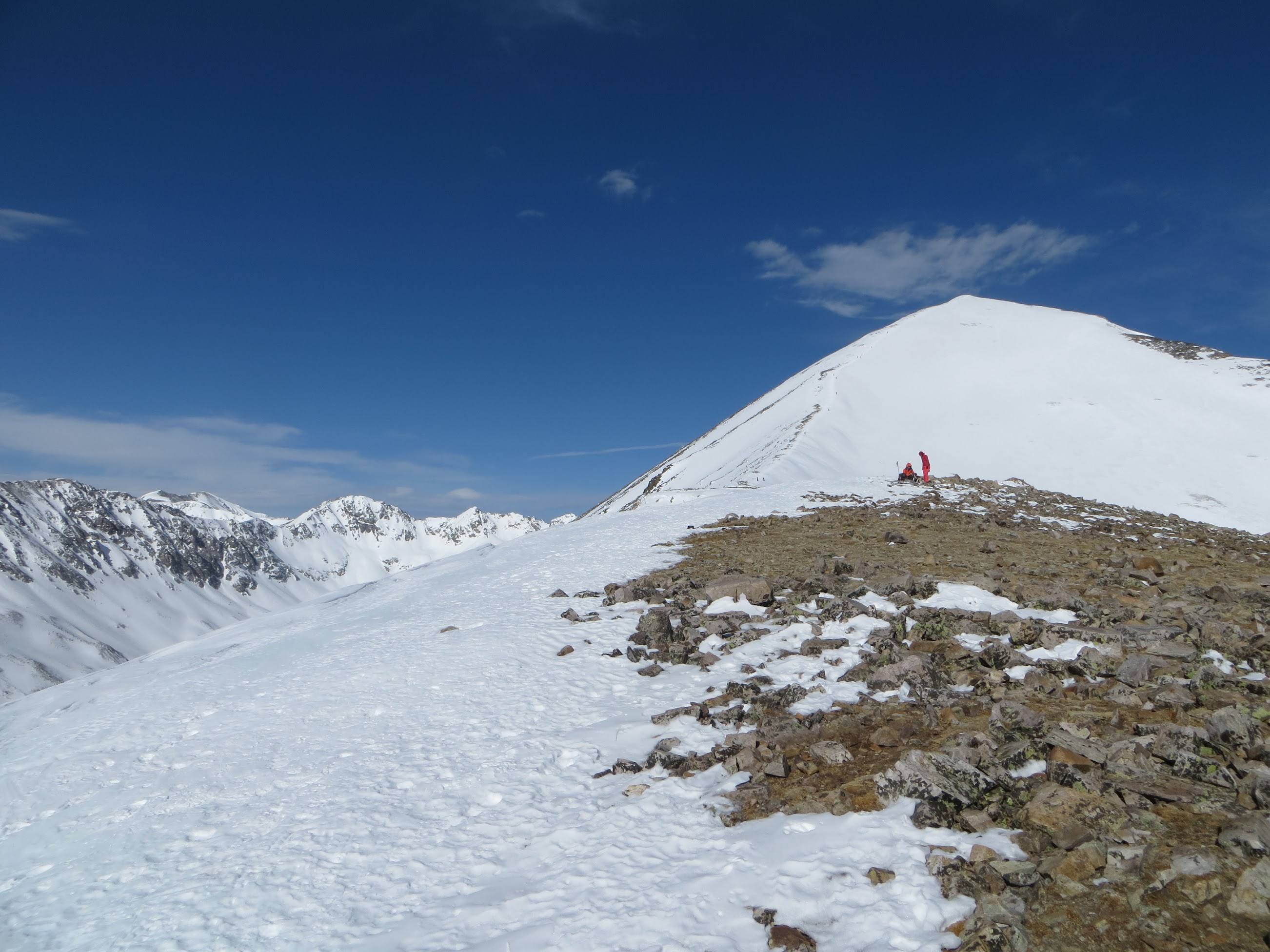
Upper East Ridge in April

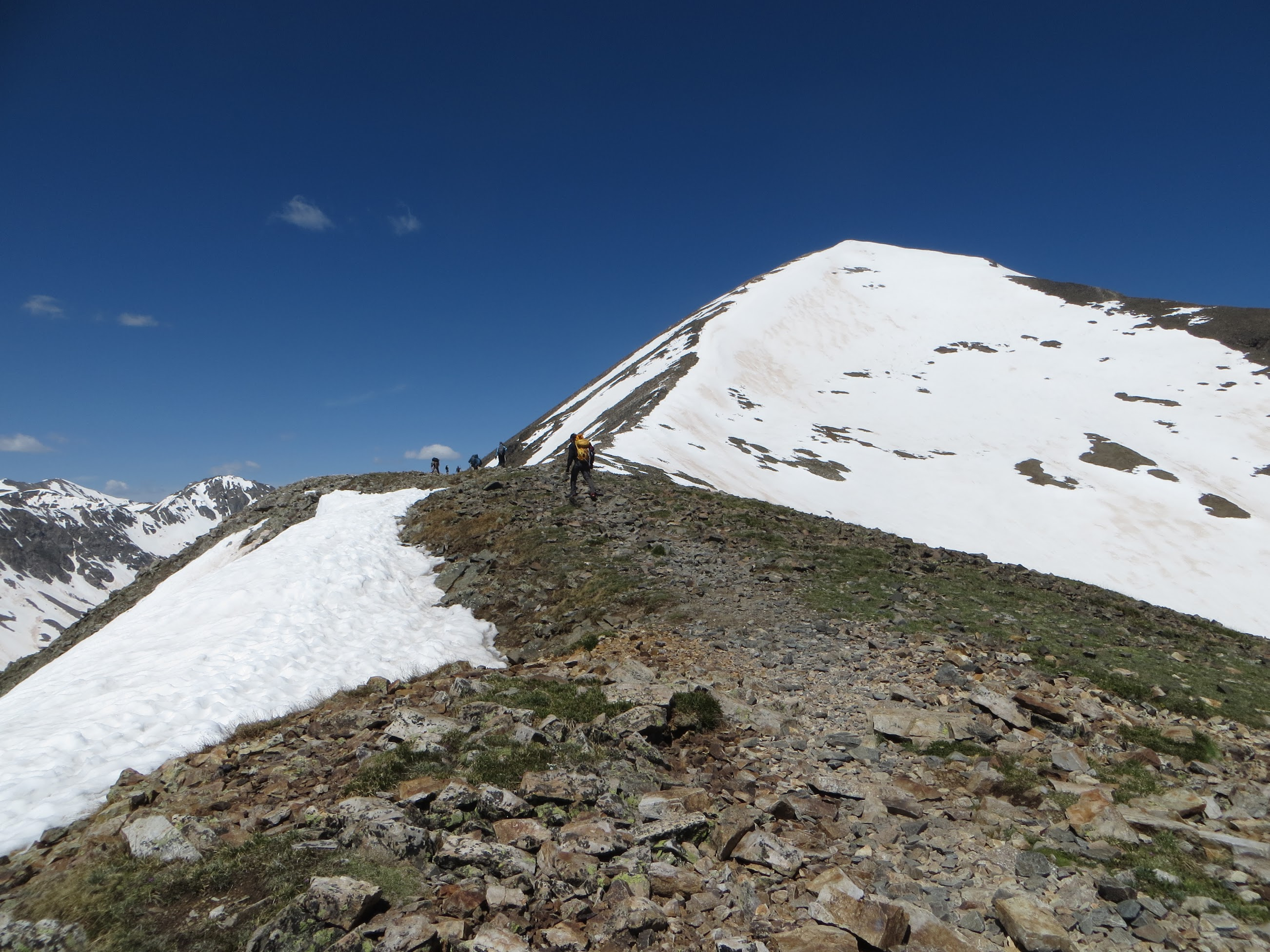
Upper East Ridge in June

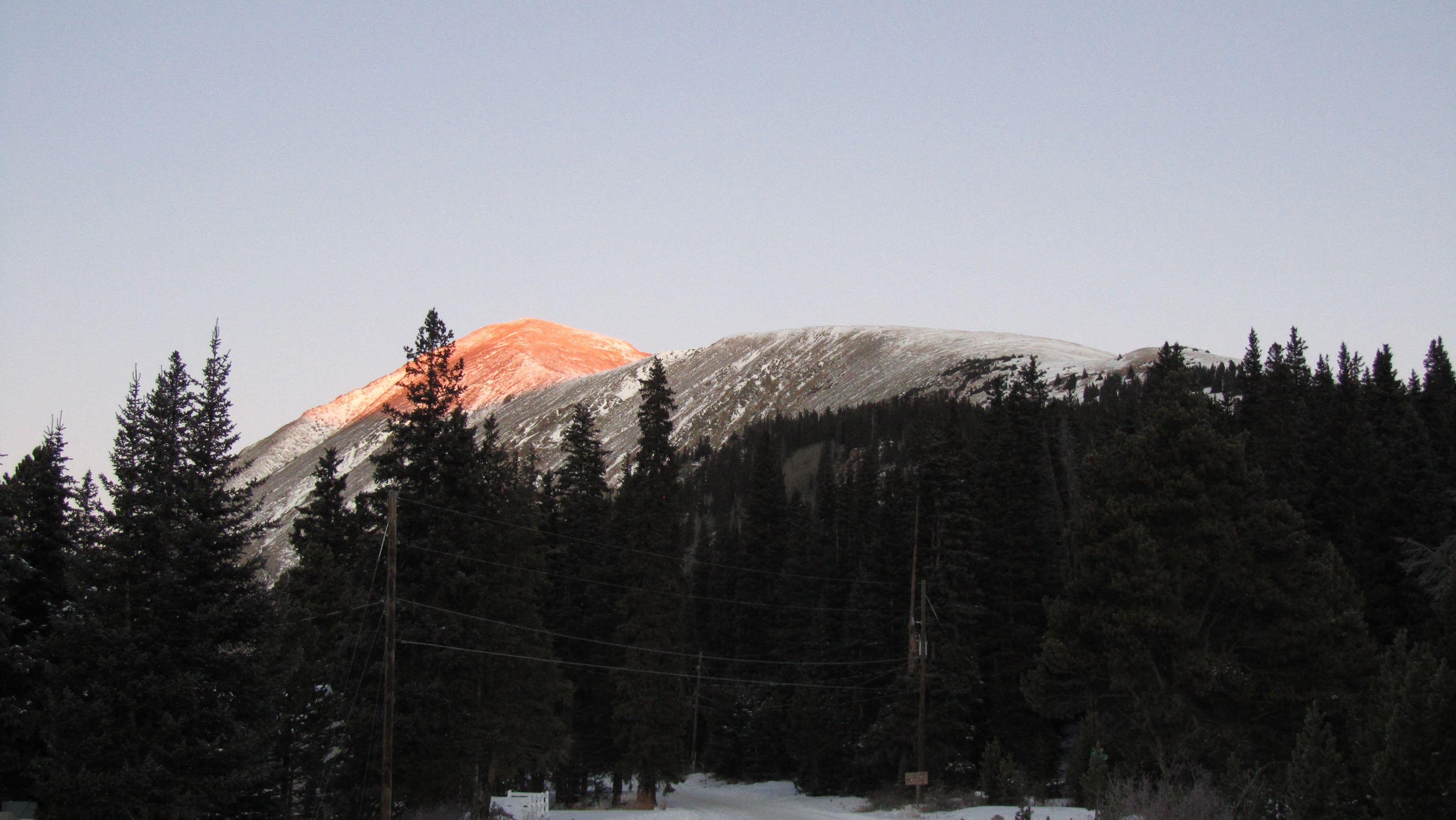
Quandary Peak With Alpenglow

== See also ==
- List of mountain peaks of Colorado
  - List of Colorado fourteeners
